= Ladies and Gentlemen, The Suburbs Have Left The Building =

Ladies and Gentlemen, The Suburbs Have Left the Building (Suburbs album)

Compilation album by The Suburbs
- Released: October 27, 1992
- Genre: New wave
- Length: 1:04:34
- Label: Twin/Tone
- Producer: Paul Stark, Steve Greenberg

The Suburbs chronology
Suburbs (1986)	Ladies and Gentlemen, The Suburbs Have Left the Building (Suburbs album) (1992)	Viva! Suburbs! Live at First Avenue (1994)

Ladies and Gentlemen, The Suburbs Have Left the Building is a compilation album by the American New wave band The Suburbs that focuses on their releases from 1978 through 1984. The album does not contain any songs from their 1986 self-titled release. It was released by Twin/Tone Records in 1992.

== Reception ==
Professional ratings
Review scores
Source	Rating
Allmusic	4/5 stars

Writing for Allmusic, music critic Stewart Mason wrote of the album "An excellent although not perfect introduction to the art rock and dance-pop world of the Suburbs... It's not all the Suburbs one will ever need—at the very least, In Combo and Credit in Heaven are essential—but it's a fine entry into the group for newcomers."

Ira Robbins of Trouser Press called the compilation "a useful 19-track retrospective that would have benefited from more exhaustive annotation."

== Track listing ==
All songs composed by The Suburbs.

1. "Love Is the Law" – 4:40
2. "Tape Your Wife to the Ceiling" – 1:51
3. "Black Leather Stick" – 2:47
4. "Music for Boys" – 6:46
5. "Rattle My Bones" – 3:29
6. "Cig In Backwards" – 3:46
7. "World War III" – 2:56
8. "Baby Heartbeat" – 2:41
9. "Goggles" – 3:21
10. "Prehistoric Jaws" – 2:23
11. "Cows" – 1:35
12. "Monster Man" – 3:14
13. "Cig Machine" – 1:26
14. "Spring Came" – 3:18
15. "Girlfriend" – 4:51
16. "Drinking with an Angel" – 5:28
17. "Waiting" – 3:43
18. "The Best is Over" – 4:56
19. "Chemistry Set" – 1:23

== Personnel ==
- Chan Poling – vocals, keyboards
- Beej Chaney – vocals, Beejtar
- Hugo Klaers – drums
- Bruce C. Allen – guitar
- Michael Halliday – bass
