= Suburbs (disambiguation) =

Suburbs are a residential area or a mixed use area, either existing as part of a city or urban area or as a separate residential community within commuting distance of a city.

Suburbs, Suburb or The Suburbs may also refer to:

- The Suburbs, a 2010 album by Arcade Fire
  - "The Suburbs" (song), a 2010 song by Arcade Fire
- The Suburbs (band), an American rock band
  - The Suburbs EP, a 1978 extended play by The Suburbs
  - Suburbs (album), 1986
- Suburb (film), a 1951 Argentine drama film
- "The Suburbs" (Ruel song), 2025

== See also ==
- Suburban (disambiguation)
- Suburbia (disambiguation)
