= The Dead Man (Manet) =

1860s painting by Édouard Manet

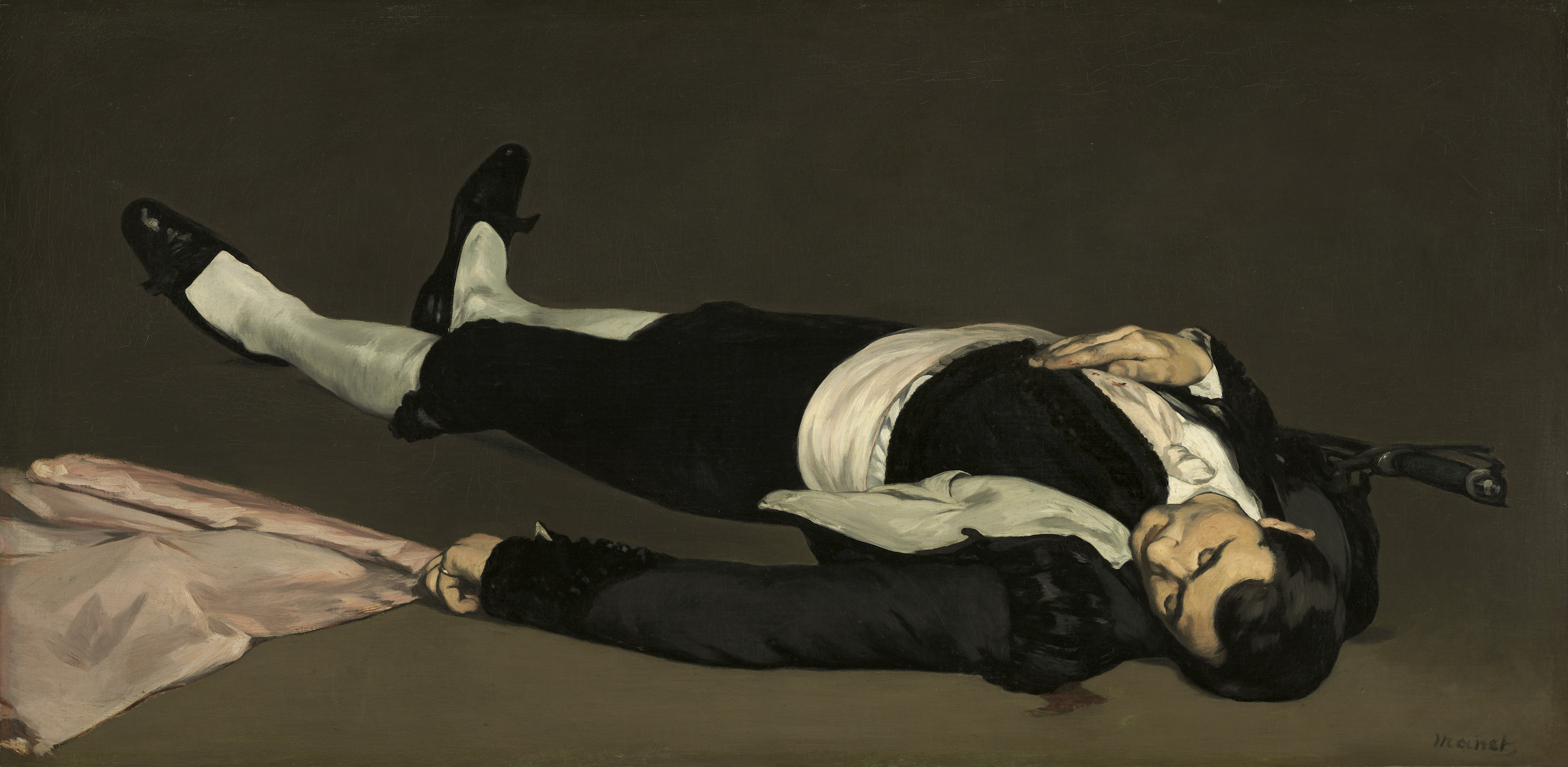
- Artist: Édouard Manet
- Year: 1864/1865
- Medium: oil on canvas
- Dimensions: 75.9 cm × 153.3 cm (29.9 in × 60.4 in)
- Location: National Gallery of Art, Washington, D.C.
- Website: https://www.nga.gov/artworks/1179-dead-toreador

The Dead Man (L'Homme mort; originally entitled The Dead Toreador or Le Torero mort) is an 1860s oil on canvas painting by Édouard Manet, produced during a period in which Manet was strongly influenced by Spanish themes and painters such as Diego Velázquez, Francisco de Goya and bullfighting.

On 14 September 1865, Manet wrote to Baudelaire:

One of the most beautiful, most curious and most terrible spectacles one can see is a bull hunt. On my return, I hope to put on canvas the brilliant, flickering and at the same time dramatic appearance of the corrida I attended.

Among his other his paintings on the theme are The Matador Saluting and The Bullfight.

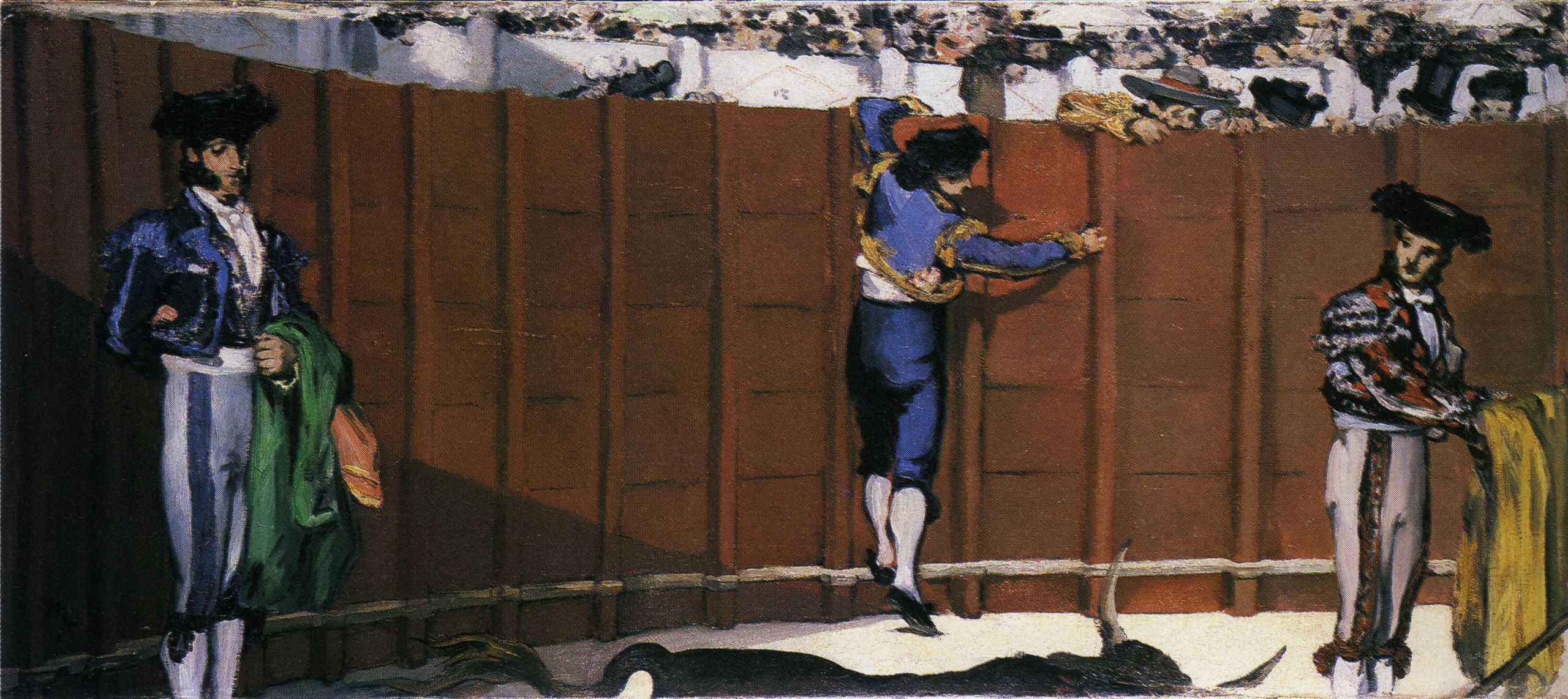
The Bullfight (New York, Frick Collection).

The work was originally part of a larger composition entitled Episode from a Bullfight, directly influenced by Goya's La Tauromaquia and Alfred Dehodencq's Bullfights.

The canvas was accepted for the Salon of 1864, where many critics identified A Dead Soldier as one of the main inspirations for the figure that became The Dead Man. This was possibly by a Neapolitan artist but attributed to Diego Velázquez and was then in the Hermann Alexander de Pourtalès' collection, later being acquired by the National Gallery, London. In his complete account of the 1864 Paris Salon, Théophile Thoré-Burger even asserted that "the figure of the dead toreador is boldly copied after a masterpiece from the Pourtalès gallery, painted by Vélasquez". He also insinuated that Manet had directly copied that work, a comment strongly refuted by Baudelaire.

A very large photograph of Dead Soldier had been published by Goupil in 1863 and some even theorised that Manet had seen the original before painting Episode in a Bullfight. Critics also identified as influences Jean-Léon Gérôme's Dead Caesar or even an illustration from the novel Histoire de Gil Blas de Santillane by Jean Gigoux. The main influence, however, was probably Vélasquez, an influence also to be seen in Manet's The Execution of Emperor Maximilian. The critics also mocked Episode's lack of relief, the poor proportions of its figures and the unreal space. Stung by this criticism, Manet cut the canvas up. He kept two parts of the original work — The Dead Man is one of them, though it was subject to a major reworking by Manet after he cut it from the original work, turning it into a powerful independent work. To give it a more universal character he also renamed it to its present name ready for its display at the Salon of 1867. The other part Manet saved is now titled The Bullfight — Manet's signature was added to it after his death.

== Legacy ==
The dead man was appropriated in 2007 by the painter Herman Braun-Vega in the painting ¿Que tal? Don Francisco à Bordeaux ou le rêve du Novillero (Goya, Vélasquez, Manet, Monet, Botan), which traces the artistic filiations between Velazquez, Goya, Manet and Monet, with The dead man considered a direct legacy of Vélasquez.

== In popular culture ==
The painting is featured on the cover of Minneapolis New Wave band The Suburbs' 1984 album Love Is the Law.

== See also ==
- List of paintings by Édouard Manet

== Bibliography ==
- Coffin Hanson, Anne (1977). Manet and the Modern Tradition. New Haven and London: Yale University Press. ISBN 0300024924.
- Reff, Theodore (2005). Manet's Incident in a Bullfight. The Council of The Frick Collection Lecture Series. New York. ISBN 0-912114-28-2.
- Cachin, Françoise; Moffett, Charles S.; Wilson-Bareau, Juliet (1983). Manet 1832-1883 (in French). Paris: Réunion des Musées Nationaux. ISBN 2711802302.
- Tabarant, Adolphe (1947). Manet et ses œuvres (in French). Paris: Gallimard.
- Thoré-Burger, Théophile; Bürger, William (1870). Salons de William Bürger, 1861-1868, avec une préface par Théophile Thoré (in French). Vol. 2, t. II. Paris: Jules Renouard.
- Pichois, Claude; Ziegler, Jean (1973). Baudelaire, correspondance (in French). Vol. 2, t. II. Paris: Gallimard.
