= Beej Chaney =

American musician (1957–2025)

- Born: Blaine John Chaney; April 30, 1957
- Origin: Minneapolis, Minnesota, U.S.
- Died: January 5, 2025 (aged 67) Hermosa Beach, California, U.S.
- Genres: New Wave/punk
- Instrument: Guitar
- Years active: 1977–2014
- Formerly of: The Suburbs, The Technocats

Blaine John "Beej" Chaney (April 30, 1957 – January 5, 2025) was an American musician. He was best known as singer and guitarist for Minneapolis punk/New Wave group The Suburbs from 1977 to 2014. He also owned Los Angeles recording studio Shangri-La for about two decades from the late 1990s to 2011.

== Early life ==
Chaney was born on April 30, 1957, and grew up in Deephaven, Minnesota. He was interested in music from a young age, and bought his first guitar, a Gibson Les Paul, at age 14 after saving money from working at his father's landscaping business. Later he met future Suburbs bandmate Chan Poling. Chaney described himself as "a very angry, scared young man in high school," which he said helped give him the drive to succeed as a musician. "I wanted to do something I wanted to do. The anger isn’t there as much, but the hunger in the beginning was what was fueling us." He and Poling moved to California in 1974 to attend art school, where they both found inspiration in the Los Angeles punk scene. They formed a band called The Technocats in 1976 along with Su Tissue of post-punk band Suburban Lawns.

== Career ==
=== With The Suburbs ===
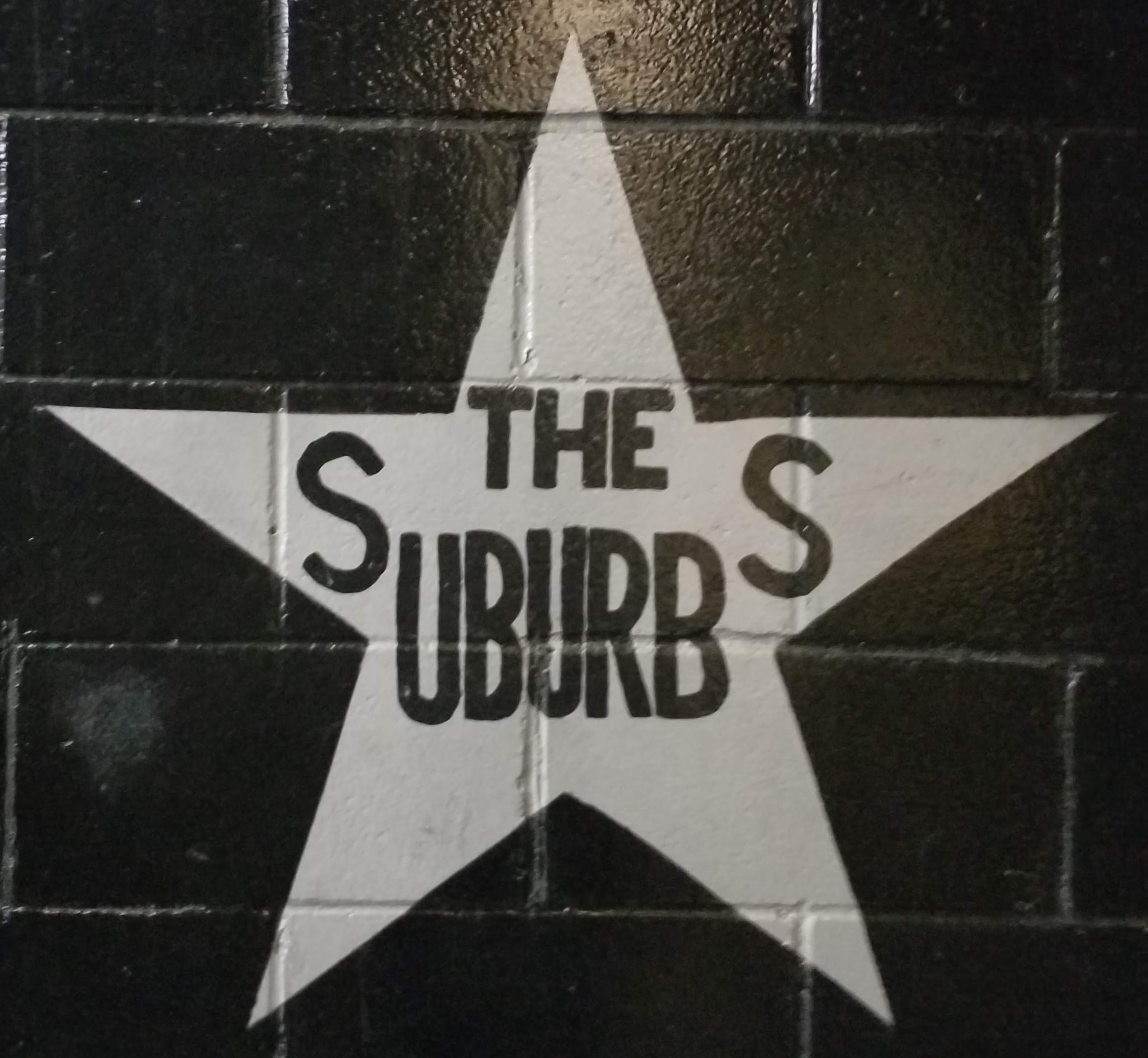
The Suburbs' star on the outside mural of the Minneapolis nightclub First Avenue

After Poling and Chaney returned to Minnesota in 1977, they decided to form a new band, and asked Poling's friend Chris Osgood of Minneapolis punk band Suicide Commandos to help them find other musicians. After meeting drummer Hugo Klaers, guitarist Bruce Allen, and bassist Michael Halliday, the Suburbs were formed in the western suburbs of Minneapolis in November 1977. Poling and Chaney both sang, and Chaney's unique sound on guitar came to be known by fans as "beejtar." Chaney described his guitar style in a 1983 interview with Cashbox magazine as "a lot of emotion just brought through strings and a couple of pickups and a piece of wood. It sounds different every night, changing with my moods and different intensities. I try to reach for the moment."

With a sound that crossed the sophisticated glam rock of Roxy Music and David Bowie with the rawer energy of punk-inflected groups like Talking Heads and Devo, the band found great success in Minneapolis and the Midwest, and scored radio and dance-club hits with the songs "Music for Boys", "Waiting", and "Love Is the Law". Cyn Collins, author of Complicated Fun: The Birth of Minneapolis Punk and Indie Rock, 1974–1984, described Chaney as "a riveting front man, menacing and hilarious at the same time." His quirky, unpredictable stage presence was often compared to Iggy Pop. The band released four albums and two EPs, including the well-regarded In Combo, Credit in Heaven, and Love Is The Law, before breaking up in 1987.

Chaney moved to Los Angeles in 1990. Although the Suburbs reformed in the early 1990s, Klaers noted that the physical distance between Chaney and the rest of the band contributed to Chaney's growing sense of creative dissatisfaction: "Everything changed. It kind of put a dent in his creative juices." Although Chaney continued to play with the band, his presence diminished over time. He performed on the 2013 comeback album Si Sauvage, but retired from the Suburbs in August 2014.

As part of the Suburbs, Chaney was honored with a star on the outside mural of the Minneapolis nightclub First Avenue, recognizing performers that have played sold-out shows or have otherwise demonstrated a major contribution to the culture at the iconic venue. Receiving a star "might be the most prestigious public honor an artist can receive in Minneapolis," according to journalist Steve Marsh.

=== Solo ===
Outside of the Suburbs, Chaney also released two solo works, the 2003 album Windows and the 1992 EP Reckless Heart. The Reckless Heart single was positively reviewed by several trade magazines. The Hard Report praised its "cutting-edge rhythm guitar" and called it "rough in nature yet effective in approach." Billboard said that the song was "bolstered by a catchy, singalong chorus" and compared Chaney's "heavily stylized vocal" to Warren Zevon. Cashbox was less positive, saying that Chaney's vocals sounded "gimmicky and dated, almost more reminiscent of Bobby 'Boris' Pickett on 'The Monster Mash'".

Before Chaney's death in 2025, he had been working on a rockabilly/punk album called Shake It All Up with Robby Vee, the son of 1960s singer Bobby Vee. Chaney co-wrote, sang and played guitar on all the songs. The album had been due for release in early 2025. Vee told the St. Paul Pioneer Press after Chaney's death that the album release was on hold, and that it would be reimagined as "a tribute to his legacy.”

=== Shangri-La ===
Chaney bought the Malibu recording studio Shangri-La in the late 1990s for $2 million. He invested an additional $2 million into the studio and its recording equipment. Musicians that recorded there during his ownership included Weezer, Metallica, Kings of Leon, and Dire Straits' Mark Knopfler. He sold the studio to Rick Rubin in 2011.

== Personal life and death ==
Chaney was married to the Cargill family heiress Sarah MacMillan, daughter of William Duncan MacMillan. They divorced in the late 2000s. He had three daughters.

On January 5, 2025, Chaney died while swimming in the Pacific Ocean near Hermosa Beach, California, where he had been living. He was 67. Officials called the death an accident. He had also survived a near-death incident the year before while swimming, which had put him in a coma for three days.

After his death, Suburbs bandmate Klaers told the Minnesota Star Tribune that Chaney's contributions to the band were "priceless. ... His lyrics, his singing, his guitar playing, everything about him were super unique. There's not a guitarist in the world that plays a guitar like Beej. Granted he was not a guitar virtuoso, but he was very, very profound. He was more passionate about music than anyone in the band. He just lived and breathed to play music."

== Discography ==
=== With The Suburbs ===
- The Suburbs EP (Twin/Tone, 1978)
- In Combo (Twin/Tone, 1980)
- Credit in Heaven (Twin/Tone, 1981)
- Dream Hog EP (Twin/Tone, 1982)
- Love Is The Law (Mercury/Universal, 1984)
- Suburbs (A&M, 1986)
- Ladies and Gentlemen, The Suburbs Have Left The Building compilation (Twin/Tone, 1992)
- Viva! Suburbs! Live at First Avenue live album (Twin/Tone, 1994)
- Chemistry Set: Songs of the Suburbs 1977–1987 (Beejtar/Universal, 2003) compilation/live album
- High Fidelity Boys - Live 1979 live album (Garage D'or, 2006)
- Si Sauvage (2013)

=== Solo ===
- Reckless Heart EP (1992)
- Windows (2003)
