= Viva! Suburbs! Live at First Avenue =

Live album by The Suburbs
- Released: 1994
- Recorded: April 24, 1993
- Genre: New wave
- Length: 1:13:00
- Label: Twin/Tone

The Suburbs chronology
Ladies and Gentlemen, The Suburbs Have Left The Building (1986)	Viva! Suburbs! Live at First Avenue (1994)	Chemistry Set: Songs of the Suburbs 1977–1987 (2003)

Viva! Suburbs! Live at First Avenue is a live album by the American New wave band The Suburbs that was recorded "mostly" on April 24, 1993 at First Avenue, a music venue in Minneapolis, Minnesota. Viva! Suburbs! Live at First Avenue was released by Twin/Tone in 1994.

== Track listing ==
1. "Waiting"
2. "Rattle My Bones"
3. "DD 69"
4. "Idiot Voodoo"
5. "Cig Machine"
6. "Goggles On"
7. "Tape Your Wife to the Ceiling"
8. "Life is Like"
9. "Every Night's A Friday Night in Hell"
10. "Spring Came"
11. "Urban Guerillas"
12. "Music for Boys"
13. "Drinkin' with an Angel"
14. "It's Alright"
15. "Cows"
16. "Black Leather Stick"
17. "Love Is the Law"
18. "Girlfriend"
19. "Underwater Lovers"
20. "Even Stars Fade"

== Personnel ==
- Bruce C. Allen – guitar, banshee vocals
- Beej Chaney – vocals, Beejtar
- Michael Halliday – bass
- Hugo Klaers – drums
- Chan Poling – keyboards, vocals

=== Additional personnel ===
- Kevin Nord – trumpet
- Laurie Glaser –trumpet
- Max Ray – sax
- Rochelle Becker – baritone sax
- Kurt Nelson – guitar on "Drinkin' with an Angel"

== Production notes ==
- John "Strawberry" Fields – engineer
- Del Monte Lee Wilkes-Booth – live mix
- Chan Poling – mixing
- Hugo Klaers – mixing
- Wallace Fleming – mixing on "It's Alright" and "Even Stars Fade"
- Bruce C. Allen – art direction
- Jay Smiley – cover photo
- Steve Peck – photography
- Rip Nordhaugan – photography
- Stan Crocker – concert lighting
