= 17 Songs =

17 Songs or Seventeen Songs may refer to:

- Frédéric Chopin: 17 Polish Songs, Op.74, 1829
- 17 Songs (Maria Farantouri album), original album 1994
- 17 Songs (The Wallets album), compilation album
