= The Bullfight =

1864-65 Édouard Manet painting

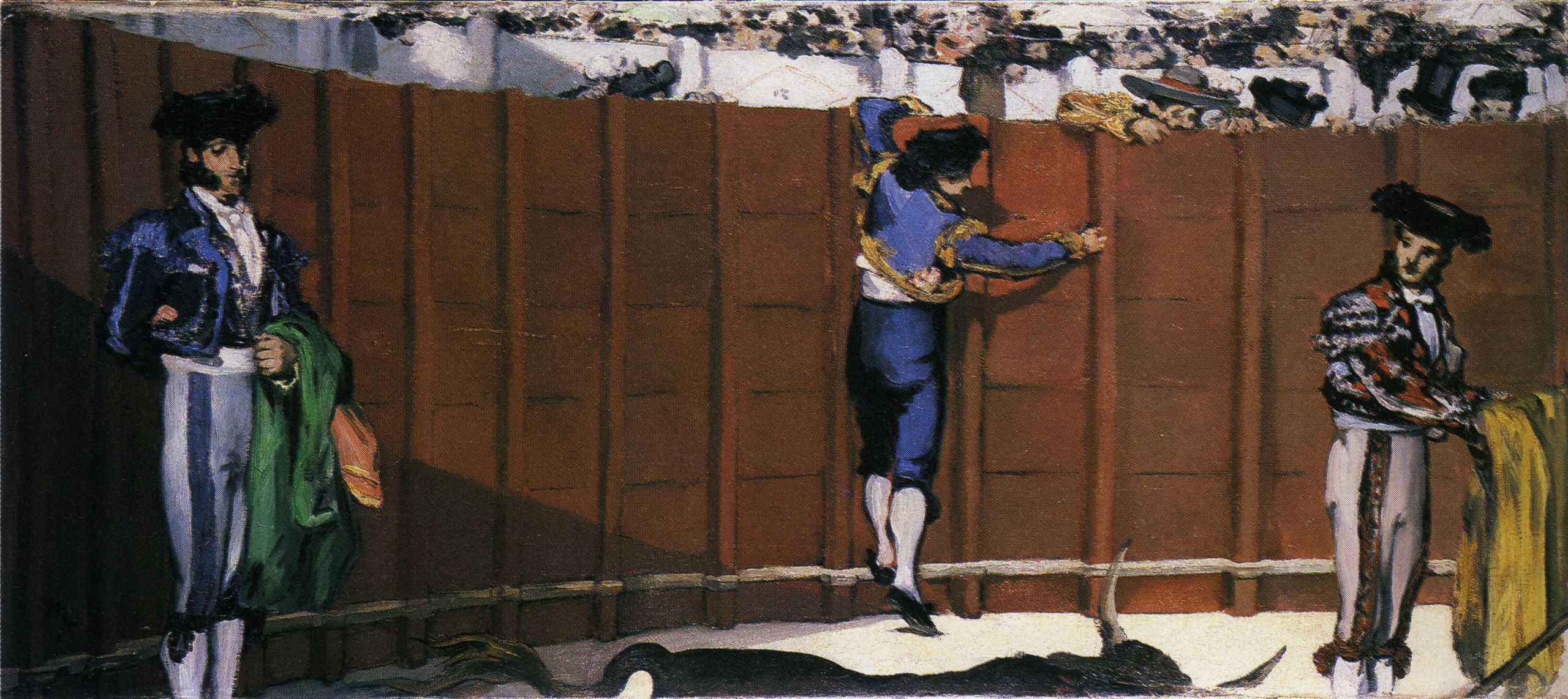
- Artist: Édouard Manet
- Year: 1864/1865
- Medium: oil on canvas
- Dimensions: 47.9 cm × 108.9 cm (18.9 in × 42.9 in)
- Location: The Frick Collection, New York

The Bullfight (La Corrida) is an 1864–1865 oil on canvas painting by Édouard Manet, now in the Frick Collection in New York. Like The Dead Man, it was originally part of a larger composition entitled Episode in a Bullfight. The scene was inspired by a trip that Manet took to Spain for ten days in the fall of 1865. He described the bullfight he witnessed in a letter to Charles Baudelaire as "one of the finest, most curious and most terrifying sights to be seen."

== The cutting ==
After having recut Épisode, Manet then reworked L'Homme mort, and cut La Corrida in such a way as to keep three bullfighters at the barrier: the first title chosen for this work was Toreros en action. But he had to cut almost the entire bull if he wanted to keep the men on foot. The artist decided instead to cut off the feet of the bullfighter on the left and trim the crowd in the stands.

== See also ==
- List of paintings by Édouard Manet
- The Frick Collection Custom prints

== Bibliography ==
- Bois, Mario (1994). Manet: tauromachie et autres thèmes espagnols (in French). Paris: Plume. ISBN 2-908034-72-7.
- Anne Coffin Hanson, Manet and the Modern Tradition, New Haven and London, Yale University Press, 1977 (ISBN 0300024924)
- Theodore Reff, Manet's Incident in a Bullfight, New York: The Council of The Frick Collection Lecture Series, 2005 (ISBN 0-912114-28-2)
- Cachin, Françoise; Moffett, Charles S.; Wilson-Bareau, Juliet (1983). Manet 1832-1883 (in French). Paris: Réunion des Musées Nationaux. ISBN 2711802302.
- Tabarant, Adolphe (1947). Manet et ses œuvres (in French). Paris: Gallimard.
- (in French) Théophile Thoré-Burger and William Bürger, Salons de William Bürger, 1861-1868, avec une préface par Théophile Thoré, vol. 2, t. II, Paris, Jules Renouard, 1870
- (in French) Claude Pichois and Jean Ziegler, Baudelaire, correspondance, vol. 2, t. II, Paris, Gallimard, 1973
