= Dream Hog EP =

Dream Hog

EP by The Suburbs
- Released: November 30, 1982
- Genre: New wave
- Label: Twin/Tone
- Producer: Steven Greenberg and Paul Stark

The Suburbs chronology
Credit In Heaven (1981)	Dream Hog (1982)	Love Is the Law (1984)

Dream Hog EP is an EP released by the band The Suburbs. Initially released by Twin/Tone Records, it was later reissued on the Mercury label, making it the band's first major label release.

== Track listing ==
12" (TTR 8230)

1. "Roll Over City"
2. "Waiting"
3. "Yo Sa Ba I I Noni"
4. "The Best Is Over"
5. "Waiting (Club Mix)"

== Personnel ==
- Chan Poling - keyboards, vocals
- Beej Chaney - beejtar, vocals
- Hugo Klaers - drums
- Bruce C. Allen - guitar, vocals
- Michael Halliday - bass
