= High Fidelity Boys - Live 1979 =

Live album by The Suburbs
- Released: 2006
- Genre: New wave
- Label: Garage D'or
- Producer: Terry Katzman

The Suburbs chronology
Chemistry Set: Songs of the Suburbs 1977–1987	High Fidelity Boys - Live 1979 (2006)	Si Sauvage (2013)

High Fidelity Boys - Live 1979 is a full-length live album by the band The Suburbs recorded between March and October 1979 at Jay's Longhorn in Minneapolis, Minnesota. It was released by Terry Katzman's Garage D'or Records in 2006.

== Track listing ==
1. Stubby Voodoo
2. I'm Bored
3. Amyl Nitrate
4. I Like the Beat
5. Gotta Go Right Now
6. Alterations
7. Drinking in the Day
8. Memory
9. Housewife
10. Beat Me with a Hammer
11. Baby Heartbeat
12. Tiny People
13. Beejstate
14. You
15. Black Leather Stick
16. When I Get Home
17. Bongo Rock
18. Life on Earth
19. Big Steer
20. Your Lies, the Sky
21. Prehistoric Jaws
22. Googles On
23. High Fidelity Boys
24. I Shoot Pistols
25. Change Agent
26. World War Three
27. Chemistry Set
28. Cig Machine
29. Stereo
30. Underwater Lovers
31. Daredevil 69'
32. Cows

== Personnel ==
- Blaine John Chaney (BEEJ) - Vocals and Beejtar
- Bruce C. Allen - Vocals and lead guitar
- Hugo Klaers - Drums and vocals
- Michael Halliday - Bass
- Chan Poling - Vocals and keys

== Credits ==
- Produced and arranged by Terry Katzman
- Mastered by Tom Herbers at Third Ear Recording, 2006
- Photos: Greg Helgeson, Michael Marcos, Laurie Allen, Twin/Tone archives; inside band collage by Bruce C. Allen
- Recorded on a Trusty Onkyo Deck
- Research by Mark Janovec and Tarik Straub, Paul Stark, Charley Hallman, Peter Jesperson were Twin/Tone
- Stage introductions by Peter Jesperson and Hugo Klaers
