= Music for Boys =

Music for Boys may refer to:

- "Music for Boys", 1981 song by The Suburbs from the album Credit in Heaven
- "Music for Boys", 1991 song by Pet Shop Boys featured on "DJ Culture"

== See also ==
- Music for Men, a 2009 album by Gossip
