= In Combo =

Studio album by The Suburbs
- Released: January 20, 1980
- Genre: New wave
- Length: 31:40
- Label: Twin/Tone Records
- Producer: Paul Stark

The Suburbs chronology
The Suburbs EP (1978)	In Combo (1980)	Credit in Heaven (1981)

In Combo is the debut album released by the American New wave band The Suburbs, released in 1980.

== Reception ==
Professional ratings
Review scores
Source	Rating
Allmusic	4.5/5 stars

Writing for Allmusic, music critic Stewart Mason called the album "one of the pioneering releases of the American post-punk indie scene, and proof that the Minneapolis scene of the early '80s wasn't just Replacements and Hüsker Dü-style guitar aggression... Later albums were arguably more complex, but In Combo remains probably the Suburbs' greatest vinyl moment."

In his retrospective review of the Suburbs' early albums, Ira Robbins of Trouser Press said that In Combo "displayed signs of incipient musical greatness", praising the band's enthusiasm and unpredictability.

== Track listing ==
All songs composed by The Suburbs.

1. "Hobnobbin With the Executives" – 2:02
2. "Tiny People" – 2:36
3. "DD 69" – 1:45
4. "Goggles On" – 3:20
5. "Black Leather Stick" – 2:49
6. "Eyesight" – 2:58
7. "Big Steer Blues" – 2:26
8. "Baby Heartbeat" – 2:42
9. "Cows" – 1:38
10. "Underwater Lovers" – 2:34
11. "Cig Machine" – 1:25
12. "Drinking" – 4:14
13. "Chemistry Set" – 1:11

== Personnel ==
- Chan Poling – keyboards, vocals
- Beej Chaney – Beejtar, vocals
- Hugo Klaers – drums
- Bruce C. Allen – guitar, vocals
- Michael Halliday – bass

== Production notes ==
- Paul Stark – producer, engineer
- Doug Sax – digital remastering
- Robert Hadley – digital remastering
