= Chemistry Set: Songs of the Suburbs 1977–1987 =

Compilation album by The Suburbs
- Released: September 23, 2003
- Genre: New wave
- Length: 55:00
- Label: Beejtar

The Suburbs chronology
Viva! Suburbs! Live at First Avenue (1994)	Chemistry Set: Songs of the Suburbs 1977–1987 (2003)	High Fidelity Boys - Live 1979 (2006)

Chemistry Set: Songs of the Suburbs 1977–1987 is a compilation album by the American New wave band The Suburbs, released in 2003. The two-disc package contains selected studio tracks and a DVD featuring 37 minutes of live footage of a series of 2002 reunion shows at the Minneapolis club First Avenue. It also include the band's last single, "Don't Do Me Any Favors".

== Reception ==
Professional ratings
Review scores
Source	Rating
Allmusic	4/5 stars

Writing for Allmusic, music critic Mark Deming wrote of the album "This is still a very listenable collection of Suburbs material, pulling together some superb examples of their muscular, smart-ass take on new wave dance-rock... Chemistry Set ably documents their strong suits."

== Track listing ==
All songs composed by The Suburbs.

1. "Chemistry Set" – 1:10
2. "Cig Machine" – 1:24
3. "Black Leather Stick" – 2:49
4. "Goggles On" – 3:20
5. "Rattle My Bones" – 3:28
6. "Music for Boys" – 6:47
7. "Tape Your Wife to the Ceiling" – 1:53
8. "Cows" – 1:39
9. "Baby Heartbeat" – 2:42
10. "Monster Man" – 3:17
11. "Spring Came" – 3:18
12. "Girlfriend" – 4:51
13. "Love Is the Law" – 4:42
14. "Drinking with an Angel" – 5:27
15. "America Sings the Blues" – 2:44
16. "Don't Do Me Any Favors" – 3:46
17. "Bongo Rock" – 1:43

== DVD Track listing ==
All songs composed by The Suburbs.

1. "Waiting"
2. "Monster Man"
3. "Life is Like"
4. "Love is the Law"
5. "Rattle My Bones"
6. "Girlfriend"
7. "Googles On"
8. "Drinking with An Angel"

== Personnel ==
- Chan Poling – vocals, keyboards
- Beej Chaney – vocals, guitar
- Hugo Klaers – drums
- Bruce Allen – guitar
- Michael Halliday – bass
- Hearn Gadbois – percussion
- Tom Burnevik – horn
- Kevin Nord – horn
- Max Ray – horn
- Scott Snyder – horn
- Maggie MacPherson – background vocals
