= Richard Brettell =

American art historian (1949–2020)

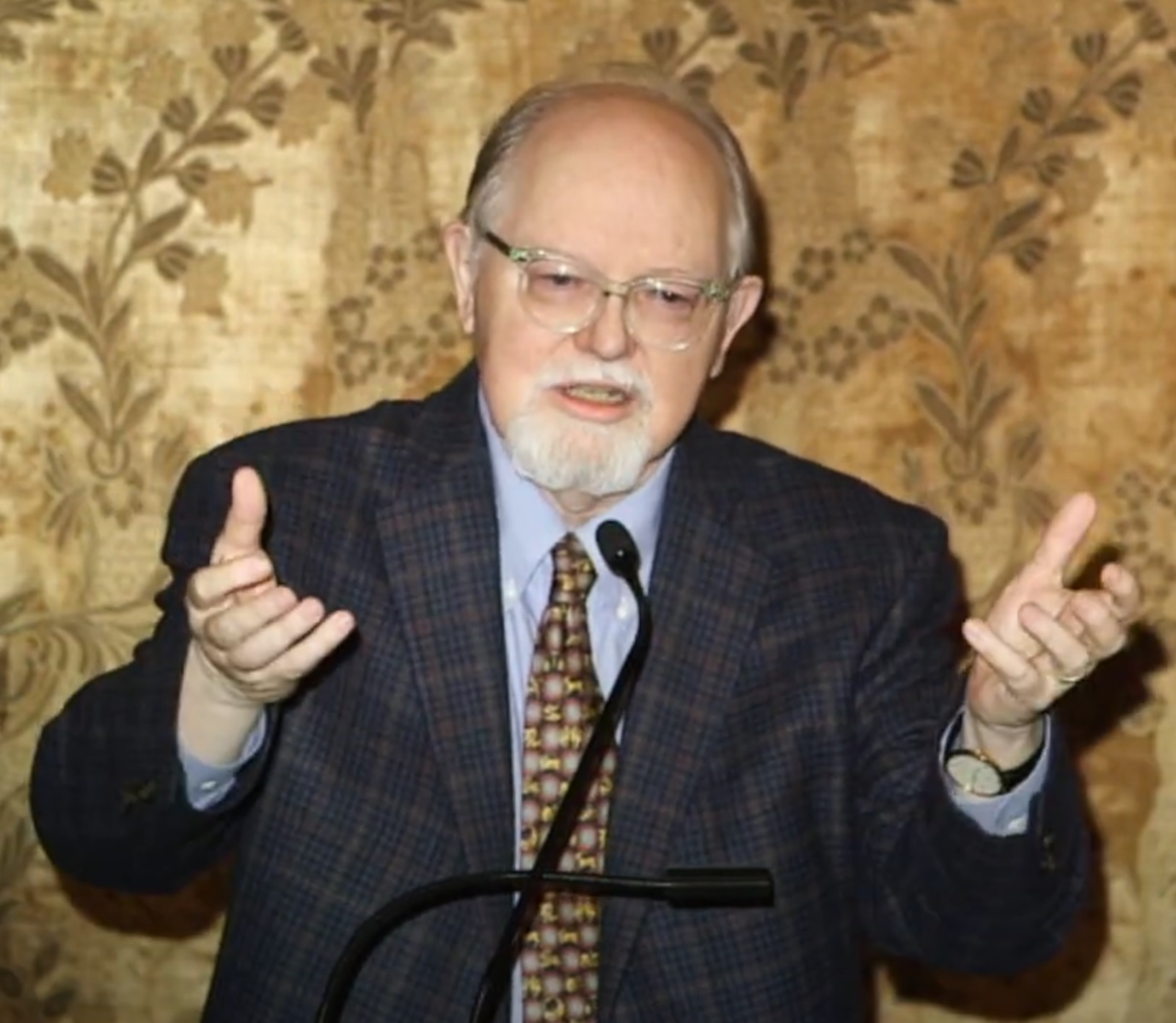
- Born: January 17, 1949; Rochester, New York
- Died: July 24, 2020 (aged 71); Dallas, Texas
- Occupations: Art historian, Museum director, Curator
- Spouse: Caroline Brettell

Academic background
- Education: Yale University
- Doctoral advisor: Anne Coffin Hanson

Academic work
- Institutions: University of Texas at Dallas, Dallas Museum of Art, Art Institute of Chicago, University of Texas at Austin
- Main interests: Impressionism and Post-Impressionism

Richard Robson "Rick" Brettell (January 17, 1949 – July 24, 2020) was an American art historian and museum director recognized for his transformative impact on the arts in Dallas, Texas. Noted for his prowess as a curator, fundraiser, and institution-builder, he was hailed in the Dallas Morning News as a "rainmaker extraordinaire" and "the most culturally 'important' man in Dallas."

Brettell moved to Dallas in 1988 to become the Director of the Dallas Museum of Art, a position he held until 1992. He would later join the faculty of the University of Texas at Dallas, where he served as Margaret M. McDermott Distinguished Chair of Art and Aesthetic Studies and inaugural director of the Edith O'Donnell Institute of Art History. During his time at UT Dallas, Brettell spearheaded the university's successful efforts to acquire the Barrett Collection of Swiss Art and the Crow Collection of Asian Art. The Crow Collection is now housed both at the downtown Dallas location, and at the Athenaeum at UT Dallas, which features a reading room named for Brettell that displays his personal library. At the time of his death in 2020, Brettell was campaigning for the creation of the "Museum of Texas Art"—or MoTA—at Dallas' art deco Fair Park.

For his achievements, Brettell was made a Chevalier and Commandeur of the Ordre des Arts et Lettres and a Fellow of the American Academy of Arts and Sciences. He is also the namesake for the Richard Brettell Award in the Arts at UT Dallas, as well as the Dallas Museum of Art's Richard R. Brettell Lecture Series on 19th and 20th century European art.

Brettell also recorded three courses on art for the Teaching Company, an educational streaming service.

== Early life and education ==
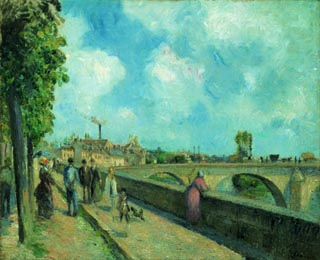
Brettell's dissertation examined Pointoise as represented in the artwork of Camille Pissarro

Brettell was born in Rochester, New York and moved to Denver, Colorado in the 2nd grade. He later attended Yale University, where at first he planned to study molecular biophysics. His encounter with Yale professor George Kubler, however, convinced him to shift his focus to the arts. Brettell would remain at Yale to receive his Bachelor's, Master's, and PhD degrees, completing his dissertation, "Pissarro and Pontoise," under the supervision of Anne Coffin Hanson.

At Yale, Brettell also met Caroline Brettell (née Bieler), whom he married in 1973. That same year they moved to Paris for a year and Portugal for six months for Caroline's dissertation fieldwork.

== Early career ==
In 1976, Brettell accepted an offer to join the faculty at the University of Texas at Austin as an assistant professor of the History of Art. He quickly became a student favorite for his engaging lectures and a popular course, "Modern Art and the City of Paris."

In 1980, Brettell left academia to become the Searle Curator of European Painting at the Art Institute of Chicago. He oversaw the renovation of the institute's European art collection and organized numerous international exhibitions, including A Day in the Country, Impressionism and the French Landscape, for which he would be designated a Chevalier of the Ordre des Artes et Lettres by the French government.

== Director of the DMA and aftermath ==
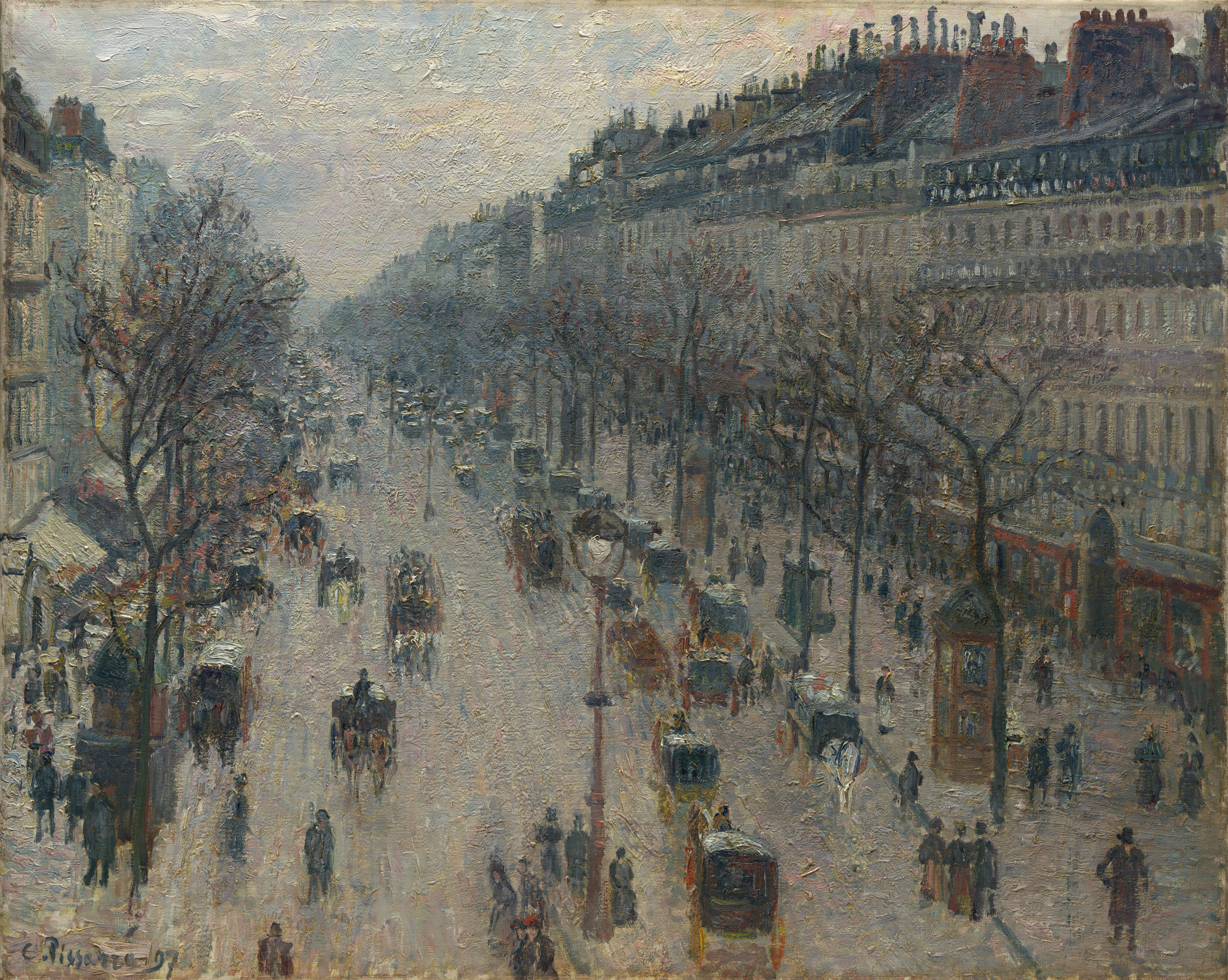
Brettell's 1992 DMA exhibition, The Impression and the City: Pissarro's Series, was the first to bring together the artist's cityscapes

In 1988, Brettell left Chicago to become McDermott Director of the Dallas Museum of Art. He quickly developed a reputation as an ambitious, blunt, and somewhat rebellious leader—D Magazine ran a lengthy article on his first two years at the museum with the heading "Art's Bad Boy." Still, despite significant budget constraints and some controversy, Brettell's tenure at the DMA was marked by remarkable expansion: the museum hosted international exhibitions on the arts of Latin America and Africa, acquired more than 3,000 objects, and began construction on a 140,000 sq. ft addition, the Nancy and Jake Hamon Building. In 1992, Brettell partnered with Joachim Pissarro to present The Impressionist and the City: Pissarro's Series, the first exhibition on Camille Pissarro's cityscapes.

Brettell remained open to a long future at the DMA, telling D Magazine in 1990, "It's possible I'll be here ten years. It's possible I'll be here the rest of my life. I can't not see things through." His directorship came to a sudden and scandalous end in 1992, however, when he was arrested as part of a Dallas police sting and pressured by a divided board to resign. The sting and the media's reporting on Brettell's arrest were criticized by the American Civil Liberties Union of Texas, D Magazine, and the Dallas Observer.

Though ousted, Brettell continued to be actively involved with the DMA, consulting on the Hamon wing, which opened in 1993. After leaving the DMA, he found renewed success as a museum consultant, founding president of the Dallas Architecture Forum, and Vice President in charge of programming for the McKinney Avenue Contemporary (MAC). The MAC is a nonprofit arts organization founded by Claude Albritton III, a former DMA board member who had disagreed with Brettell's treatment in the wake of his arrest. In the mid-1990s, as the DMA experienced an extended "exhibition drought," the MAC was viewed by some as a rival of the museum, or even, as D Magazine put it at the time, "Brettell's popular government-in-exile."

== Returning to Academia and FRAME ==
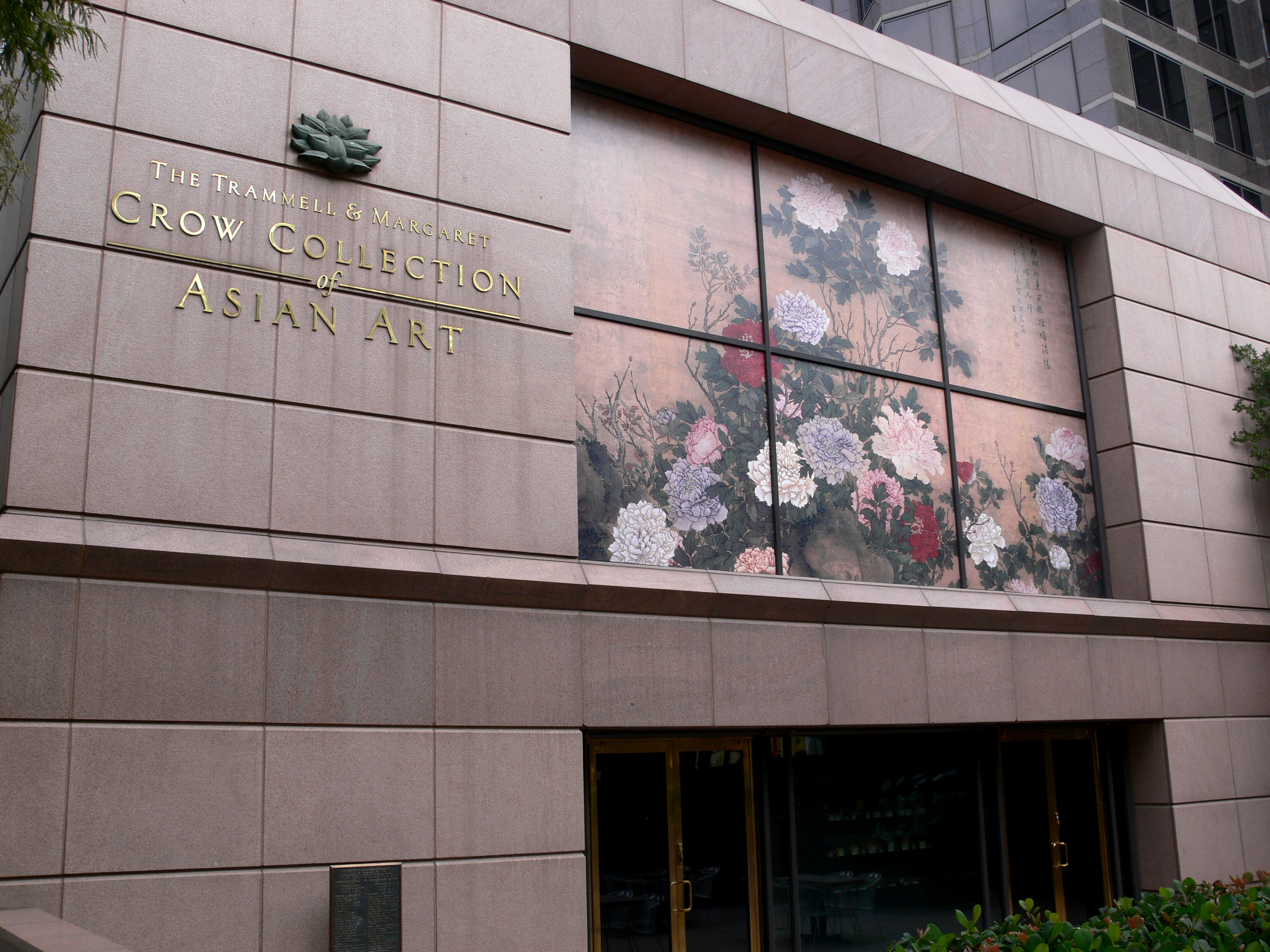
Brettell spearheaded UT Dallas' successful effort to acquire the Crow Collection of Asian Art

In 1998, Brettell accepted a position as Professor of Aesthetic Studies at the University of Texas at Dallas. The following year he founded the university's Center for the Interdisciplinary Study of Museums. In 2005, he was appointed the Margaret M. McDermott Distinguished Chair of Art and Aesthetic Studies. Brettell also continued working as a curator, and in 2010 organized Pissarro's People, a widely reviewed exhibition of 92 works by Camille Pissarro at the Clark Art Institute.

In 2014, UT Dallas received a $17 million gift from donor Edith O'Donnell to establish an art institute. Brettell was tapped to serve as the institute's founding director. Under his leadership, the Edith O'Donnell Institute of Art History created a new master's degree program and developed international research partnerships with Nanjing University and Museo di Capodimonte.

Alongside his academic work, Brettell worked as an art critic for the Dallas Morning News and founded and led the French Regional and American Museum Exchange (FRAME). For his work with FRAME, he was made a Commandeur of the Ordre des Arts et Lettres by the French government in 2010. In 2016, Margaret McDermott made a gift to UT Dallas to establish the Richard Brettell Award in the Arts, a $150,000 award to be given every other year to a person "whose body of work demonstrates a lifetime of achievement in their field." In 2017, the first Brettell Award went to celebrated landscape architect Peter Walker.

== Final Years, the Athenaeum, and MoTA ==
Brettell's final years were marked by further writing, organization, and advocacy for the arts in North Texas. He was credited with helping UT Dallas, a university founded on the model of the Massachusetts Institute of Technology, develop a burgeoning reputation as a center for the study of the arts. With his help, the university succeeded in acquiring the Barrett Collection of Swiss Art in 2018 and the Crow Collection of Asian Art in 2019. As of 2021, UT Dallas plans to house both collections in the future UT Dallas Athenaeum, a Morphosis-designed museum and arts complex described as Brettell's "magnum opus." The university has announced that a reading room in the museum will be named for Brettell.

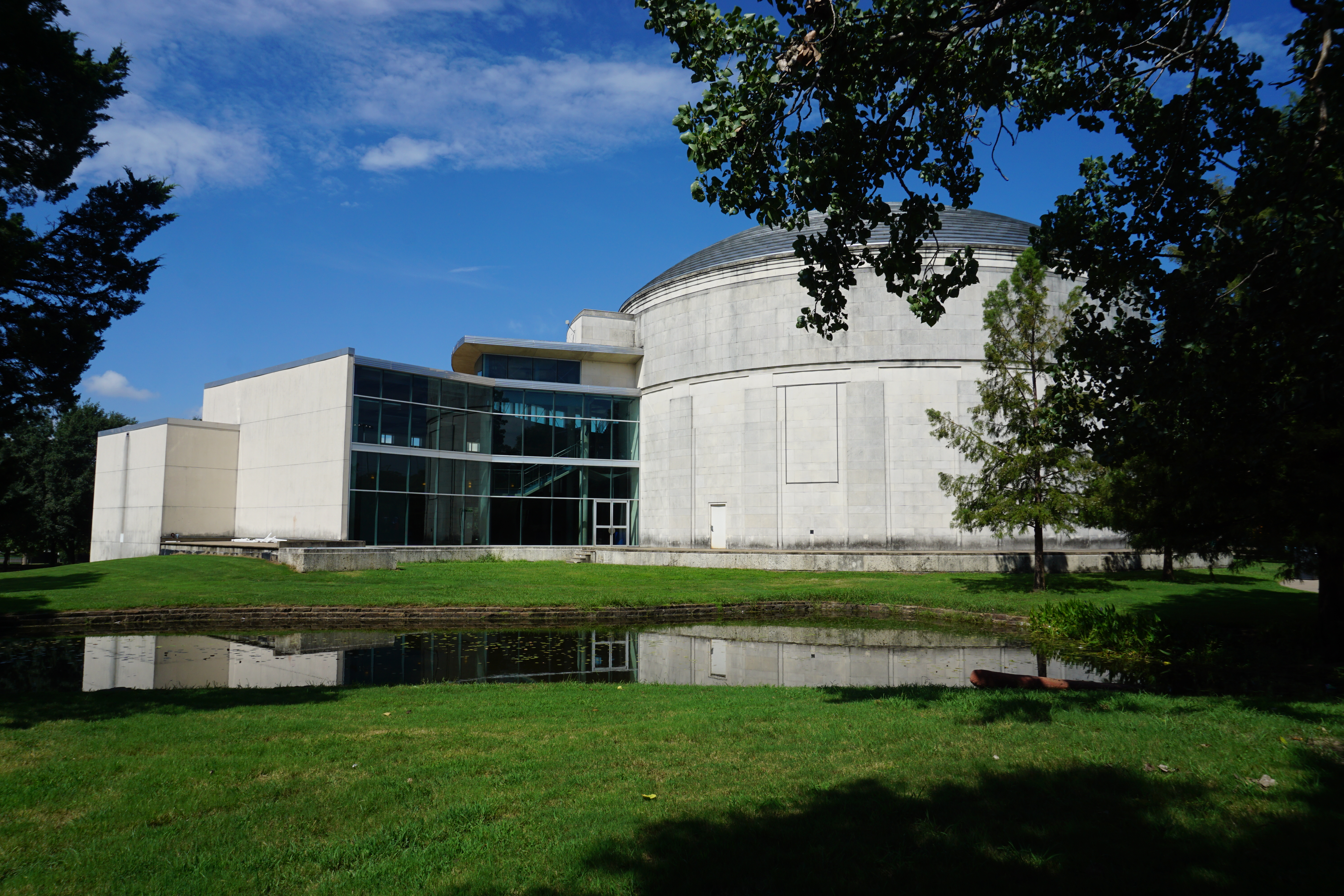
Brettell envisioned a new Museum of Texas Art in Fair Park's Science Place I

Before his death from prostate cancer in July 2020, Brettell also took up the cause of what he and his collaborators called the "Museum of Texas Art," or MoTA. The MoTA board envisioned a $46 million-plus rehabilitation of the old Science Place building at Fair Park—the home of the original Dallas Museum of Fine Arts—to create a new museum devoted to Texas art, important pieces of which have languished in storage at leading museums. In June 2020, the board of Fair Park First, the nonprofit corporation that manages Fair Park, voted 12–0 to pass on the MoTA proposal to instead pursue occupancy negotiations with Spark!, a nonprofit that designs creative environments for children. Brettell told the Dallas Morning News that he was "devastated" by the decision, arguing that, "The former DMFA building cries out to be filled with works of art again." Following Brettell's death, a tribute in D Magazine called for honoring his legacy by redoubling efforts to make his "dream of a Museum of Texas Art a reality."

== Legacy ==
Brettell's death in July 2020 was met with various tributes, including a front-page story in the Dallas Morning News. Commentary on his legacy centered on his abilities as a scholar, fundraiser, and institution-builder, highlighting his stature as a "towering figure" who revolutionized the arts in North Texas between the late 1980s and 2020.
