= Love Is the Law (Suburbs album) =

Love Is The Law (Suburbs album)

Studio album by The Suburbs
- Released: March 1984
- Recorded: June – July 1983
- Genre: New wave
- Length: 39:29
- Label: PolyGram
- Producer: Steven Greenberg, Paul Stark

The Suburbs chronology
| Dream Hog EP (1982) | Love Is The Law (Suburbs album) (1984) | Suburbs (1986) |

Love Is the Law is an album by the American New wave band The Suburbs, released in 1984.

The album cover includes a reproduction of Édouard Manet's The Dead Toreador, which the band had seen on display at the National Gallery of Art in Washington, D.C. In an interview with Cashbox magazine, Chan Poling said that the band liked the ironic juxtaposition of the album's themes of warmth and love with the coldness of an image of a man lying dead.

The album won two Minnesota Music Award in 1984, for both the Love is the Law album and its title single.

== Reception ==
Professional ratings
Review scores
| Source | Rating |
|---|---|
| Allmusic | 4.5/5 stars |

Writing for Allmusic, music critic Vince Ripol wrote that the album "concentrates [the Suburbs'] alternative dance-rock into a single-length showcase of their strengths... In general, Love Is the Law is harder and tighter than previous releases, and even the most intense tracks produce lingering melodies in the wake of relentless rock & roll. The Suburbs may not have equaled the success or longevity of other Minneapolis musicians from the 1980s, but Love Is the Law holds its own against the more celebrated albums of its time."

In his retrospective review of the Suburbs' early albums, Ira Robbins of Trouser Press called Love Is the Law "easily the Suburbs’ apex, a powerful and personality-laden set of songs that incorporate more rock than usual, as well as horns and some of the band’s most offbeat lyrics."

== Track listing ==
All songs composed by The Suburbs.

1. "Love Is the Law" – 4:44
2. "Monster Man" – 3:18
3. "Rattle My Bones" – 3:28
4. "Skin" – 4:24
5. "Accept Me Baby" – 3:47
6. "Hell A" – 4:32
7. "Perfect Communist" – 5:07
8. "Rainy Day" – 5:02
9. "Crazy Job" – 5:07

== Personnel ==
- Chan Poling – keyboards, vocals
- Beej Chaney – vocals
- Hugo Klaers – drums
- Bruce Allen – guitar, vocals
- Michael Halliday – bass
- Terry Paul – vocals
- Tom Burnevik – saxophone
- Scott Snyder – trumpet

== Production notes ==
- Steven Greenberg – producer, engineer
- Paul Stark – producer, engineer
- Howie Weinberg – mastering
- Robert Hadley – digital remastering
- Édouard Manet – cover painting
- Laurie Allen – photography
