= Suburban Lawns =

American post-punk band

- Origin: Long Beach, California
- Genres: New wave, post-punk
- Years active: 1978–1983
- Labels: Suburban Industrial, I.R.S. Records
- Past members: Su Tissue (Sue McLane); Frankie Ennui (Richard Whitney); John Gleur (John McBurney); Vex Billingsgate (William Ranson); Chuck Roast (Charles Rodriguez)

Suburban Lawns were an American post-punk band formed in Long Beach, California in 1978 by CalArts students William "Vex Billingsgate" Ranson and Sue "Su Tissue" McLane. They later recruited Richard "Frankie Ennui" Whitney, Charles "Chuck Roast" Rodriguez, and John "John Gleur" McBurney.

== History ==
After forming in 1978, Suburban Lawns released their debut single, "Gidget Goes to Hell", in 1979 on their own Suburban Industrial label. The song gained the band notoriety when its Jonathan Demme-directed music video was shown on Saturday Night Live.

The band was part of the LA punk scene at the time, alongside bands such as X, Saccharine Trust and Fear.

Their musical performances included creative costumes with Su Tissue delivering, according to Ennui a "full mind blowing impact". Though music journalists found her performances confusing, that she "looked so bored and uncomfortable standing on stage with all of these boys that looked like they were having so much fun".

Their sole album, Suburban Lawns, produced and engineered by EJ Emmons and Troy Mathisen, was released in 1981 on I.R.S. Records, featuring new wave radio favorite "Janitor" (previously released as a single in 1980).

It has been said that the lyrics of "Janitor" were derived from a real-life conversation between Sue "Su Tissue" McLane and friend Brian Smith. According to Smith, the two were conversing in a loud room when they first met:

She asked me what I did for a living. I said "I'm a janitor," and she thought I said "Oh my genitals." [Richard "Frankie Ennui" Whitney] overheard this and wrote the song.

According to Richard Whitney, this story is somewhat backwards; the music and all of the lyrics apart from “Oh, my genitals! I’m a janitor!” were already written when Sue McLane added them herself:

Su was definitely more of a poet than I have ever dreamed of being. The lyrics, except for Su’s contribution, are pretty straightforward science-nerd stuff about all things explosive. Su’s addition, whatever the source (and I have no reason to doubt what Brian Smith has apparently written about how Su came up with that addition), gave the song a poetical spin that added the dimension it needed to make it interesting. That’s exactly why, in my opinion, our best songs were those that were written collaboratively.

Gleur departed during the recording of the Richard Mazda-produced five-song EP Baby, released in 1983, and the band folded shortly afterward.

== Later projects ==
After the split, Whitney and Ranson formed a new, short-lived band called the Lawns, while McLane attended Berklee College of Music, where she studied piano.

In 1976, McLane also formed a short-lived band called The Technocrats with keyboardist Chan Poling and guitarist Beej Chaney, who would later split off to form Minneapolis punk/New Wave group The Suburbs.

In 1984, McLane released a solo album, Salon de Musique. She also played the role of Peggy Dillman in Demme's 1986 comedy movie Something Wild opposite Melanie Griffith, Jeff Daniels and Ray Liotta.

In 1985, William Ranson (aka Vex Billingsgate) formed a new side project called Alfalfa. Members included- William Ranson (aka Vex Billingsgate) - Guitar & vocals, Jamie Loveless - Guitar, Steve Reed - Bass, Curtis DeHoff - Bass, Jeff Schweer - Drums, Lee Howell - Drums

They released one 7" Lucky Guy/Jewels on Urban Garden Hi Fi Disc.

In the early 2000s, Ranson and Gleur formed a band called Suburban John, along with drummer Jon Tomis.

== Discography ==
=== Studio albums ===
- Suburban Lawns (1981, I.R.S. Records)

=== Singles and EPs ===
- "Gidget Goes to Hell" 7" single (1979, Suburban Industrial)
- "Janitor" 7" single (1980, Suburban Industrial)
- Baby 12" EP (1983, I.R.S. Records)

Suburban Lawns was reissued in 2021 on Superior Viaduct Records to critical acclaim.

== Influence and legacy ==
The band influenced bands that followed them such as The Minutemen. However, their influence can still be found up to the present day, with Maximum Rocknroll magazine citing Suburban Lawns, along with Devo as being a major influence on "this millennium's reboot of oddball new wave".

Priests' Katie Alice Greer wrote of her love for the band in Making Waves #4 fanzine in 2016.

Frank Zappa cited "Gidget Goes to Hell" as one of his favorite punk records.

Photographs of Suburban Lawns are in the Victor Sedillo archive at the Charles E. Young Research Library at UCLA.

On October 17, 2025, The Dead Milkmen released a cover version of the song "Janitor", which was published to YouTube and Bandcamp.
