= The Flamin' Oh's =

American band

Flamingo Flamin' Oh's
- Origin: Minneapolis
- Genres: Rock; Power pop; New wave
- Years active: 1977-present
- Labels: Fat City Records; Blackberry Way Records
- Members: Robert Wilkinson; Jody Ray
- Past members: Bob Meide; Joseph Behrend; Johnny Rey
- Website: https://www.flaminohs.com/

The Flamin' Oh's, originally known as Flamingo, was a Minneapolis rock, new wave, and power pop band originally established in 1977 by Robert Wilkinson, Johnny Rey, Jody Ray, Robert "Bob" Meide, and Joseph Behrend.

== History ==
=== Early years ===
The Flamin's Oh's started as a simple gig band in 1977 which preformed in Minneapolis–Saint Paul. The band's original name was Flamingo and had their opening act at Jay's Longhorn Bar on June 1, 1977. Later, due to a copyright infringement by the 1950's doo-wop band The Flamingos, the band was forced to change its name to the Flamin' Oh's. The band networked heavily at Oar Folkjokeopus, a local record store, with local Minnesota bands including Hüsker Dü, The Replacements, Suicide Commandos, and Soul Asylum, among others.

After the band released of their first extended play titled "Flamingo" in 1978, the band did multiple tours along the East Coast. Guitarist Johnny Rey eventually left the band in 1980 and formed his own band. The Flamin' Oh's got significant radio attention in Minnesota with their 1980 hit single "I Remember Romance". The bands self-titled debut LP was named "Flamin’ Oh’s" in 1980, their second LP was "Oh!" in 1981. Their LP "Oh!" most notably included the band’s hit “Stop". In total, the Flamin' Oh's released 8 albums and CD's, and 5 singles and extended plays.

The Flamin's Oh's are purported to be one of the first major bands to utilize music videos during the early 1980's new wave scene. Chuck Statler (music video director of videos for Devo Elvis Costello, Nick Lowe, and El Vez) directed two videos for the Flamin’ Oh’s for the songs “I Remember Romance” and "Stop", which were both featured on MTV.

=== Later years ===
The band broke up in 1987. The band has a star on the First Avenue nightclub's "Star Wall" in Minneapolis, which features stars for notable local signers and music artists.

Joseph Behrend, the bands vocalist and keyboard player was murdered in 1989. The band's drummer, Robert "Bob" Meide died on June 20, 2010. Bob had played for several bands including The Apostles and Prodigy besides the Flamin' Oh's.

== Discography ==
=== Albums ===
- Flamin' Oh's (Fat City Records, 1980)
- Oh! (Fat City Records, 1981)
- Desire (Blackberry Way Records, 1985)
- Paint the Sky (Blackberry Way Records, 1986)
- Love or Money (never released)
- Live at Moby Dick's 1983 (Art Records, 2003)
- Long Live the King (SMA Records, 2005)
- Here and Now (self-released, 2015)

=== Singles & EP's ===
- Flamingo (Bigger Than Life Records, 1978)
- I Remember Romance (Fat City Records, 1980)
- Stop/ Gotcher' Head (Flame Records, Fat City Records, 1981)
- The First Two Albums + Bonus Track (self-released, 2003)
- Flamin' Oh's/ Strange Times (self-released, 2019)

== See also ==
- Oar Folkjokeopus
- Jay's Longhorn Bar
- Rock music groups from Minnesota
