= Jay's Longhorn Bar =

Punk-rock club in 1970s-1980s Minneapolis

- The Longhorn
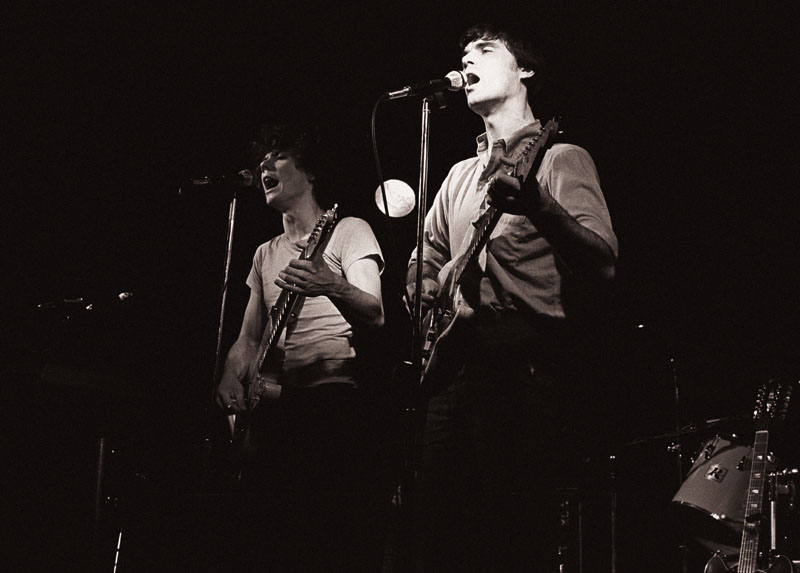
- Jerry Harrison (L) and David Byrne of Talking Heads performing at Jay's Longhorn Bar in August 1978
- Interactive map of Jay's Longhorn Bar
- Address: 14 S. 5th St.
- Location: Minneapolis, Minnesota
- Coordinates: 44°58′45.82″N 93°16′17.71″W
- Owner: Jay Berine, Hartley Frank
- Events: Punk, New Wave, jazz

Construction
- Opened: June 1, 1977
- Closed: 1980

Jay's Longhorn Bar was a small scale concert venue, known for being a nexus of the punk rock and New Wave scenes in Minneapolis, Minnesota, in the late 1970s and early 1980s.

== History ==
Most frequently referred to by patrons as The Longhorn, Jay's Longhorn Bar was described by music critics as a legendary part of the punk and New Wave genre's history and a "punk rocker's paradise." One of the earliest clubs in America to regularly book punk, New Wave, and alternative-rock bands, the Longhorn was the only concert stage in Minnesota where touring acts in those genres could regularly perform until the opening of what would become First Avenue in 1980. "The Police, Blondie, all the big acts played there," wrote Hüsker Dü guitarist Bob Mould, who frequented the venue and noted that he considered Hüsker Dü "an actual band" only after they had performed on the Longhorn stage. Robert Wilkinson, singer for Minneapolis punk band Flamingo, noted that in terms of importance to the scene, “The Longhorn was Minneapolis’ CBGB’s.”

The Longhorn was also an important crucible of the local punk-rock scene. It was the first bar ever played by both of the scene's most highly influential bands, Hüsker Dü (on May 13, 1979) and the Replacements (on July 2, 1980). Peter Jesperson, the Replacements' manager and a founder of Twin/Tone Records, who was also a DJ at the Longhorn at that time, signed the band to Twin/Tone immediately after that performance. Influential Minneapolitan New Wave band The Suburbs also had their first major success at the Longhorn; drummer Hugo Klaers said that after getting regular gigs at the venue, "we went from nobodies to this super popular band. It was just crazy. The Longhorn shows were always packed."

Located at 14 South Fifth Street in downtown Minneapolis, the Longhorn was opened by owner Jay Berine on June 1, 1977, with help from general manager-artist director-musician/songwriter Al Wodtke (of Badfinger, KYX, Crow, and Apostles). Its first headliner was Minneapolis band Flamingo, while the first national act to be booked was New York rock group Mink DeVille. The Longhorn became a notable punk rock and hardcore punk venue, booking bands such as the Buzzcocks, The Police, Gang of Four, Talking Heads, Dead Boys, Robert Gordon, Iggy Pop, the Stranglers, The Flamin' Oh's, The Suburbs, the Suicide Commandos, the Hypstrz, Naked Raygun, The Jets, the Effigies, the Ramones, Pere Ubu, Lily Tomlin, the Plasmatics, Elvis Costello, Curtiss A, and the Nerves. Before it was an established punk rock venue, the Longhorn hosted a thriving jazz scene. It was home base for the progressive jazz group Natural Life and brought with it many national and international jazz acts.

Chris Osgood, singer-guitarist of the Suicide Commandos, described the Longhorn as "like CBGB in that it was a long bar with a low ceiling and the band was up on a riser at one end of the room. It had been a Nino's Steakhouse before it turned into a bar, so it was not a dump."

The bar was later sold to Hartley Frank, who, in 1980, changed it to Zoogie's, a pizzeria and nightclub. The location is now a storage facility for Xcel Energy.

== After the Longhorn ==
On May 16, 2015, a "Longhorn Bar Reunion" was held at First Avenue and 7th St Entry in Minneapolis. Local bands and performers (including X-Boys, Curtiss A, Hypstrz, Flamin'-Oh's, Yipes! and members of The Suburbs and the Suicide Commandoes, billed as "the Sub-Commandoes"), many containing members who played at Jay's Longhorn, paid tribute.

== In popular culture ==
The club is the setting of a scene in Jonathan Franzen's 2010 novel Freedom, in which the protagonists attend a performance by the Buzzcocks. (Although the novel is fictional, the concert, which took place September 10, 1979, was real.)

Nostalgia for the heyday of the venue was the focus of Minnesota musician Dylan Hicks's song "The Longhorn Days", from his 1998 album Poughkeepsie.

== Documentary ==
In 2019, producer/director Mark Engebretson released Jay's Longhorn: Let’s Make a Scene, a documentary about the 1970s heyday of the venue. The film won several awards, including the 2021 Minnesota Documentary Award at the Frozen River Film Festival and Best Music Feature at the Queen City Film Festival in Maryland, and screened at film festivals across the U.S.
