= Suburban Lawns (album) =

Studio album by Suburban Lawns
- Released: 1981
- Genre: Post-punk; new wave
- Length: 28:29
- Label: I.R.S.

Singles from Suburban Lawns
- 1. "Janitor" Released: 1980

Suburban Lawns is the sole studio album by American band Suburban Lawns, released in 1981 by I.R.S. Records.

== Reception ==
Professional ratings
Review scores
Source	Rating
AllMusic	4/5 stars
Pitchfork	8.5/10

AllMusic called it "an off-kilter triumph", with the album also receiving favorable reviews from The Big Takeover and Louder Than War. Conversely, Trouser Press called it "highly ordinary" and "a sub-Devo mesh of hiccupping vocals, angular tunes with tiresome stop-start rhythms and a high, weedy guitar/organ sound".

== Track listing ==
No.	Title	Writer(s)	Length
1.	"Flying Saucer Safari"	Richard Whitney; William Ranson; John McBurney	2:12
2.	"Pioneers"	Whitney; Sue McLane; McBurney	2:05
3.	"Not Allowed"	McLane; Ranson	2:16
4.	"Gossip"	McLane	2:29
5.	"Intellectual Rock"	McBurney	2:05
6.	"Protection"	Ranson	1:54
7.	"Anything"	McLane	1:38
8.	"Janitor"	Whitney; McLane; Ranson; McBurney	2:30
9.	"Computer Date"	Whitney; Ranson	1:06
10.	"Mom and Dad and God"	Whitney; Charles Rodriguez	1:56
11.	"Unable"	McLane; Ranson	1:31
12.	"When in the World"	Ranson	2:48
13.	"Green Eyes"	McLane	2:53
14.	"Jam the Controls"	Whitney	1:06
