= Beat Rodeo =

American country rock musical group

Beat Rodeo (also known as The Beat Rodeo) was a country rock band from New York City during the 1980s.

== Career ==
Following the breakup of the Minneapolis-based Suicide Commandos (in which he played bass), Steve Almaas moved to New York, turned to guitar and formed The Crackers; the band's EP Sir Crackers! (1981) indicates the rough-hewn melodic rock direction Almaas would later pursue. After working with The Bongos, Almaas, along with Bongos' leader Richard Barone, headed to North Carolina to visit Mitch Easter at his Drive-In Studio; the three of them put together the four-track Beat Rodeo EP, credited to Almaas and released in 1982 on Easter's Coyote Records label. (One of the tracks, "What's the Matter", later appeared on a compilation on the Shake Some Action label in 2003.)

Almaas almost immediately formed a quartet named for the EP, but not including Easter or Barone; the single "What's The Matter" b/w "Mimi" was issued by Coyote in 1983 (under the name The Beat Rodeo). The following year, Zensor Records in Germany issued the band's first LP, Staying Out Late With the Beat Rodeo, produced by Don Dixon. The record, which shows a country bent implicit in its name (country-ish guitar sound, with a dash of fiddle), and integrates it into the already established pop-rock context. (A single, "She's More" b/w "Mistake" was also released; with the two tracks helmed by Richard Gottehrer.)The group performed "She's More" on German television.) IRS Records signed the quartet and re-issued the album with the two tracks helmed by Richard Gottehrer in 1985, shortening the band's name to simply "Beat Rodeo".

In 1986, Beat Rodeo released their second album, Home in the Heart of the Beat, produced by Scott Litt; the LP produced two singles: "Everything I'm Not" b/w "It Could Happen Here" ("Everything" also appeared on a 12" promo disc with "I'm Not Afraid (Doesn't Matter to Me)" on the flip); and "New Love" b/w "Just Friends" (with videos made for both sides of the single; "Just Friends" had been previously released on Staying Out Late.) Although "Everything I'm Not" got some airplay at college stations, none of Beat Rodeo's albums or singles were hits, and IRS dropped them from the label; the band broke up soon thereafter.

Almaas later went solo, and has released six albums to date; he also reformed the Suicide Commandos, who in 2017 released their first album in 38 years, Time Bomb.

On June 5, 2026, Almaas died at his home in Beacon, New York, due to complications from recurrent cancer.

Beat Rodeo were mentioned in the acknowledgements of Elizabeth Wurtzel's memoir Prozac Nation.

== Personnel ==
- Steve Almaas (lead vocals, guitar)
- Bill Thomas Schunk (lead guitar)
- Dan Prater (bass, vocals)
- George Usher (keyboards, vocals)
- Syd Straw (backing vocals on "Everything I'm Not")
- Mike Osborn (drums on Staying Out Late)
- Lewis King (drums on Home in the Heart of the Beat)
- Al Greller (bass on Zensor "Staying Out Late")
- Peter Moser (drums on Zensor "Staying Out Late")
