= Si Sauvage =

Studio album by The Suburbs
- Released: November 19, 2013
- Genre: New wave
- Length: 37:01
- Label: Suburbs Music
- Producer: Steve Price, The Suburbs

The Suburbs chronology
High Fidelity Boys - Live 1979 (2006)	Si Sauvage (2013)	Hey Muse! (2017)

Si Sauvage is an album released on both 12" vinyl and CD by the American New wave band The Suburbs, released in 2013. It was recorded 27 years after their last studio release.

== Reception ==
Professional ratings
Review scores
Source	Rating
Allmusic	4/5 stars

Writing for Allmusic, music critic Mark Deming wrote of the album "It doesn't take long for Si Sauvage to announce itself as an album the Suburbs couldn't and wouldn't have made in the '80s, but if this is an older and battle-weary version of the Suburbs, it still sounds and feels like them... Si Sauvage is an album about acknowledging life's lessons without regrets, and finding both sorrow and joy in the process; it's the middle-aged response to the band's best album, 1984's Love Is the Law, and a work that gains depth and power with each listen."

== Track listing ==
All songs composed by Blaine John "Beej" Chaney and Chan Poling.

1. "Born Under a Good Sign" – 4:03
2. "Turn the Radio On" – 4:14
3. "Dumb Ass Kids" – 3:10
4. "Where It Is!" – 4:05
5. "What's It Like out There?" – 4:05
6. "Reset the Party" – 3:12
7. "You've Got to Love Her" – 3:32
8. "I Liked It Better When You Loved Me" – 3:38
9. "Si Sauvage" – 3:12
10. "This Monkey" – 3:50

== Personnel ==
- Chan Poling – vocals, keyboards
- Blaine John "Beej" Chaney – vocals
- Hugo Klaers – drums
- Steve Brantseg – guitar
- Steve Price – bass
- Max Ray – saxophone
- Rochelle Becker – baritone saxophone
- Stephen Kung – trumpet
- Janey Winterbauer – vocals
- Aby Wolf – vocals

== Production notes ==
- Steve Price – producer
- Steve Nagel – assistant engineer
- Chuck Zwicky – mixing, mastering
- Kii Arens – artwork, photography
