= Home in the Heart of the Beat =

Studio album by Beat Rodeo
- Released: 1986
- Genre: Pop, rock
- Label: I.R.S.
- Producer: Scott Litt

Beat Rodeo chronology
Staying Out Late with the Beat Rodeo (1985)	Home in the Heart of the Beat (1986)

Home in the Heart of the Beat is the second and final album by the American band Beat Rodeo, released in 1986. The band supported it with a North American tour that included shows opening for the Call.

== Production ==
The album was produced by Scott Litt. Its songs were written by frontman Steve Almaas, who thought that the band's touring in support of their debut helped get them on the same musical wavelength for the recording sessions. Beat Rodeo were open to exploring new sounds and styles on Home in the Heart of the Beat, noting that the Beatles and David Bowie often recorded albums that sounded differently from the ones that had come before. Syd Straw sang on the album; Lenny Pickett contributed on saxophone. The band used synthesized strings on "Everything I'm Not".

== Critical reception ==
Professional ratings
Review scores
Source	Rating
AllMusic	4/5 stars
Alternative Rock	6/10
Duluth News Tribune	8/10
The Encyclopedia of Popular Music	3/5 stars
The Great Indie Discography	5/10
Omaha World-Herald	3.5/5 stars
The Philadelphia Inquirer	4/4 stars
Record-Journal	B−

The Philadelphia Inquirer called the album "one of the pure pop pleasures of the season." The Chicago Tribune labeled it "a great party record", noting that the band's "roots rock is tighter and far more mature (and still plenty of fun)." The Ottawa Citizen opined that Beat Rodeo "draws heavily on the Mersey beat and includes traces of Elvis Costello. At other times, though, the shadow of Carl Perkins and the ghost of Elvis Presley will surface."

The Kingston Whig-Standard praised the "post-punk energy ... taste of twangy country and REM spareness." The Orlando Sentinel considered the music "countrified rock or a modern-day version of the clean sound honed by Buddy Holly and the Everly Brothers." The Toronto Star said, "Behind a shimmering pop overlay, Almaas' and company travel an adventurous path between the light and dark regions of country-rock, rockabilly, post-punk and trad rock 'n' roll." The Post-Bulletin listed Home in the Heart of the Beat among the 15 best albums of 1986.

== Track listing ==
No.	Title	Length
1.	"Twin Hometowns"
2.	"Everything I'm Not"
3.	"New Love"
4.	"It Could Happen Here"
5.	"(I Have) Everything I Need"
6.	"I'm Not Afraid (Doesn't Matter to Me)"
7.	"In the Summertime"
8.	"Home in the Heart of the Beat"
9.	"Song for an Angry Young Man"
10.	"It's Been Too Long"
11.	"While We're Apart"
