= Caroline Brettell =

Canadian cultural anthropologist (born 1950)

- Born: 11 June 1950 (age 76); Montreal, Canada
- Education: Yale University; Brown University
- Spouse: Richard Brettell
- Awards: 2017 Fellow, American Academy of Arts and Sciences
- Scientific career
- Fields: Cultural Anthropology
- Workplaces: Southern Methodist University

Zoe Caroline Brettell (née Bieler; born June 11, 1950) is a Canadian cultural anthropologist known for her scholarship on migration and gender. She is currently Professor Emerita at Southern Methodist University, where she was previously University Distinguished Professor of Anthropology and Ruth Collins Altshuler Professor. At SMU, Brettell served as Chair of the Department of Anthropology, interim Dean of the Dedman College of Humanities and Sciences, and inaugural Director of the Dedman College Interdisciplinary Institute. She has also been President of both the Society for the Anthropology of Europe (1996–1998) and the Social Science History Association (2000–2001).

Brettell's ethnographic research in Portugal and Texas is notable for centering the gendered, lived experiences of migrants. In 2017, she was elected as a fellow of the American Academy of Arts and Sciences. In 2025, SMU's Department of Anthropology announced that its new endowed seminar series—the Caroline B. Brettell Seminars in Anthropology—would be named in honor of Brettell.

== Early life and education ==
Brettell received a Bachelor of Arts in Latin American studies from Yale University in 1971. In 1976, her husband, art historian Rick Brettell, was hired at the University of Texas, and the two moved to Austin. She completed her dissertation, Hope and Nostalgia: The Migration of Portuguese Women to Paris, and received her Ph.D. in Anthropology at Brown University in 1978. Brettell moved to Chicago in 1980.

== Career ==
Brettell joined the faculty at SMU in 1988.

== Personal life ==
Brettell was married to the late Rick Brettell, former Director of the Dallas Museum of Art and Margaret M. McDermott Distinguished Chair of Art and Aesthetic Studies at the University of Texas at Dallas.

== Books ==
- Men Who Migrate, Women Who Wait: Population and History in a Portuguese Parish. Princeton University Press, 1986.
- When They Read What We Write: The Politics of Ethnography (Editor). Praeger, 1996.
- Writing against the Wind: A Mother's Life History. Rowman & Littlefield Publishers, 1999.
- Migration Theory: Talking Across Disciplines (Co-edited with James F. Hollifield). Routledge, 2000.
- Citizenship, Political Engagement, and Belonging: Immigrants in Europe and the United States (Co-edited with Deborah Reed-Danahay). Rutgers University Press, 2008.
- Spaces of Identity: Constructing and Contesting Belonging Among Children of Immigrants (Co-edited with Faith Nibbs). Vanderbilt University Press, 2015.
