= Suburbia (disambiguation) =

Suburbia refers to the suburbs of a metropolitan area.

Suburbia may also refer to:

== Film and theater ==
- Suburbia (film), a 1983 film by Penelope Spheeris
- subUrbia (play), a 1994 play by Eric Bogosian
- subUrbia (film), a 1996 adaptation of Bogosian's play, directed by Richard Linklater

== Music ==
- Suburbis (Suburbia), a composition for piano by Federico Mompou, 1917
- "Suburbia" (song), by Pet Shop Boys, 1986
- "Suburbia", by Kelly Osbourne from Sleeping in the Nothing, 2005
- "Suburbia", by the Matthew Good Band from Beautiful Midnight, 1999
- "Suburbia", by Troye Sivan from Blue Neighbourhood, 2015
- "Suburbia", by the Wonder Years from Suburbia I've Given You All and Now I'm Nothing, 2011
- "Suburbia Overture", by Will Wood from The Normal Album, 2020

== Other uses ==
- Suburbia (board game), a city-building board game designed by Ted Alspach
- Suburbia (book), a 1973 photojournalism monograph by Bill Owens
- Suburbia (department store), a chain of department stores in Mexico
- Suburbia Roller Derby, a roller derby league based in Yonkers, New York, US

== See also ==
- Suburban (disambiguation)
- The Suburbs (disambiguation)
