= Suburbs (album) =

Suburbs (Suburbs album)

Studio album by The Suburbs
- Released: First half of 1986
- Recorded: Metro Studios, Minneapolis, MN
- Genre: New wave
- Label: A&M
- Producer: Robert Brent

The Suburbs chronology
Love Is The Law (1984)	Suburbs (Suburbs album) (1986)	Ladies and Gentlemen, The Suburbs Have Left The Building (1992)

Suburbs is an album by the American new wave band The Suburbs, released in 1986. It was their first and only release on A&M Records. The album has never been released on compact disc. It was produced by former Revolution drummer Bobby Z. (credited as Robert Brent).

== Reception ==
Professional ratings
Review scores
Source	Rating
Allmusic	2/5 stars

Writing for Allmusic, music critic Stewart Mason called the album "inappropriately produced... in a fashion that completely sublimates all of the qualities that had made the quintet so musically interesting in the first place."

Ira Robbins of Trouser Press was more positive but not ecstatic, calling it "another powerful record, albeit one whose character is less firmly held in its musical approach than its lyrics. Gone is the antsy, skittish urgency of yore; Suburbs is utterly listenable (but not overwhelmingly unique)."

== Track listing ==
All songs composed by The Suburbs.

1. "Superlove" – 4:29
2. "Heart of Gold" – 4:26
3. "Every Night's a Friday Night" – 2:59
4. "Never Stop (To Say Goodbye)" – 5:58
5. "America Sings the Blues" – 3:13
6. "#9" – 4:30
7. "Life Is Like" – 3:11
8. "Want That Girl" – 4:36

== Personnel ==
- Chan Poling – vocals, keyboards
- Beej Chaney – vocals, Beejtar
- Hugo Klaers – drums
- Bruce C. Allen – guitar
- Michael Halliday – bass

=== Additional musicians ===
- Tom Burnevik – saxophones
- Kevin Nord – trumpet, voice tracker
- Dusty Cox – saxophone solo on "Heart of Gold"

== Production credits ==
- Robert Brent – producer
- Jim Nipar – engineer
- Kirby Binder – assistant engineer
- Mike Rees – mastering
- Bruce C. Allen – art direction
- Donald Krieger – art direction
- Chuck Beeson – art direction
- Laurie Schendel Allen – cover photo
