= Credit in Heaven =

Credit In Heaven

Studio album by The Suburbs
- Released: September 25, 1981
- Recorded: April, 1981 – June 7, 1981
- Genre: New wave
- Label: Twin/Tone Records
- Producer: Paul Stark

The Suburbs chronology
In Combo (1980)	Credit In Heaven (1981)	Dream Hog EP (1982)

Credit in Heaven is an album released by the American New wave band The Suburbs, released in 1981.

== Reception ==
Professional ratings
Review scores
Source	Rating
Allmusic	4/5 stars

Writing for Allmusic, music critic Mark Deming said, "If Credit in Heaven has a flaw, it's that its reach sometimes exceeds its grasp; while none of the songs are bad, some are more immediately memorable than others... an under-appreciated milestone of the Midwestern new wave that awaits rediscovery."

In his retrospective review of the Suburbs' early albums, Ira Robbins of Trouser Press praised the album as "a slickly delivered opus that refines the band’s approach and fairly bubbles over with creative concepts, great playing and bizarre songs. ... A highly recommended stunner."

The album won a Minnesota Music Award for Best LP in 1982.

== Track listing ==
All songs composed by The Suburbs.

1. "Tired of My Plans" – 3:34
2. "Faith" – 3:53
3. "Tape Your Wife to the Ceiling" – 3:44
4. "Macho Drunk" – 4:44
5. "Ghoul of Goodwill" – 5:44
6. "Dish It Up" – 6:44
7. "Mommy" – 7:44
8. "Cigarette in Backwards" – 8:44
9. "Girl Ache" – 9:44
10. "Drinking with an Angel" – 5:28
11. "Spring Came" – 3:18
12. "Girlfriend" – 4:53
13. "Postcard" – 4:11
14. "Music for Boys" – 6:47
15. "Idiot Voodoo" – 2:25
16. "Pipsqueak Millionaire" – 4:04
17. "Credit in Heaven – 2:57

== Personnel ==
- Chan Poling – keyboards, vocals
- Beej Chaney – Beejtar, vocals
- Hugo Klaers – drums
- Bruce C. Allen – guitar, vocals
- Michael Halliday – bass
- Maggie McPherson – vocals
- Terry Paul – vocals
- Max Ray – saxophone
- Hearn Gadbois – conga

== Production notes ==
- Paul Stark – producer, engineer
- Doug Sax – digital remastering
- Robert Hadley – digital remastering
- Laurie Allen – photography
