= Suburban (disambiguation) =

Suburban refers to the suburbs of a metropolitan area.

Suburban may also refer to:

== Vehicles ==
- Station wagon or "suburban", a type of automobile
- Suburban (1911 automobile), a roadster produced in Detroit, Michigan, US
- Chevrolet Suburban, a model of sport utility vehicle manufactured by General Motors since 1934; also badged as GMC Suburban 1937–1999
  - Holden Suburban, a version of the Chevrolet Suburban sold in Australia and New Zealand 1998–2001
- DeSoto Suburban, a Chrysler automobile model 1946–1954
- Plymouth Suburban, a station wagon 1949–1978

== Other uses ==
- Sub Urban (musician) (born 1999), American pop singer
- Suburban Records, a Dutch record label
- Suburban Station, an underground commuter rail station in Philadelphia, Pennsylvania, US
- The Suburban, an English-language weekly newspaper in Quebec, Canada

== See also ==
- Suburbia (disambiguation)
- The Suburbs (disambiguation)
