= The Wallets =

Rock band from Minnesota active in the 1980s

- Steve Kramer and the Wallets at First Avenue c. 1982

Background information
- Origin: Minneapolis, United States
- Genres: Post-punk
- Years active: Early 1980s–1988
- Labels: Twin/Tone
- Past members: Steve Kramer; Erik Anderson; Jim Clifford; Rod Gordon; Max Ray

The Wallets were a band from the Twin Cities, who recorded on the local Twin/Tone Records label in the 1980s.

== History ==
The Wallets were founded as an experimental group by accordionist Steve Kramer and managed by Bob Hest.

The Allen Toussaint-produced debut album Take It was released in 1986, described by Spin as urban soul and funk with "a Cajun smell to their work". The album saw the band described as "art rockers who not only want to groove but know how to groove".

Kramer decided to retire the band in spring 1988, but waited until their final album, Body Talk, was released late in the fall before announcing the split. The Wallets performed their final show at the Guthrie Theatre in Minneapolis on January 23, 1989.

Kramer and Hest later formed an advertising agency, currently known as Hest & Kramer, Van House Weber, noted for its use of music in television ads for clients such as Target Stores, MTV, Time Warner, and Buick.

Kramer died in January 2013 at age 59.

== Musical style ==
The Minneapolis Star Tribune summed the band's style up as a "mix of polka, rock, rhythm-and-blues, jazz and whimsy".

== Awards ==
The band received several Minnesota Music Awards ("Minnies"), with ten nominations in 1987.

== Discography ==
=== Albums ===
- Take It (1986), Twin/Tone
- Body Talk (1988), Twin/Tone
- 17 Songs (1989), Twin/Tone

=== EPs ===
- Catch a Falling Star (1983), Spiffola 333

=== Singles ===
- "Night Before Christmas" (1983)
- "Totally Nude" (1986)
