= 17 Songs (Maria Farantouri album) =

Studio album by Maria Farantouri
- Released: 1990
- Label: Minos EMI
- Producer: Leo Brouwer, Vangelis

17 Songs is a 1990 album by Maria Farantouri. The album includes 17 songs on the album in Greek, Portuguese, Spanish, including covers of Caruso (song) by Leo Brouwer and Once Upon a Summertime. The album also includes 3 songs from a 1989-1990 collaboration with Vangelis, with Greek lyrics by Michalis Bourboulis.

== Track listing ==
1. Caruso (song) (duet with Dionisios Savopolous)
2. San Vicente
3. Adio querida
4. Filho
5. Once Upon a Summertime - Eddie Barclay / Michel Legrand / Eddy Marnay / Johnny Mercer
6. Solo le pido a dios
7. Sol negro (duet with Mercedes Sosa)
8. Tora Xero - music Vangelis, Greek lyrics Michalis Bourboulis.
9. La canzone del mal di luna
10. Youkali
11. I kikni
12. Wenn ich mir was Wuenschen..
13. Nanourisma (duet with Mercedes Sosa)
14. San Elektra - music Vangelis, Greek lyrics Michalis Bourboulis.
15. Sarracini
16. Esta montana
17. Odi a - music Vangelis, Greek lyrics Michalis Bourboulis.
