= Theodore Reff =

American art historian (born 1930)

Theodore Franklin Reff
- Born: 1930 (age 95–96); New York, New York
- Education: Columbia University (B.A., 1952); Harvard University (M.A., 1953; Ph.D., 1958)
- Occupations: Professor, art historian, author
- Spouses: Arlene Gottesman; Barbara Divver
- Children: 2

Theodore Franklin Reff (born 1930) is Professor Emeritus of European Painting and Sculpture, 1840–1940 at Columbia University.

Reff is an expert on French art of the nineteenth century, especially Paul Cézanne, Edgar Degas, and Édouard Manet.

In 1987 Reff was named Chevalier dans l'Ordre des Palmes Académiques, an order of merit awarded by the French government.

In 2010, at the French Consulate in New York, Reff was presented with the Insignia of Commandeur of the Ordre des Arts et des Lettres, an order of merit awarded by the French government.

== Selected publications ==
- Cézanne Watercolors (editor and co-author). New York: M. Knoedler and Co., 1963.
- Manet: Olympia. London: Allen Lane, 1976. ISBN 0713908076
- The Notebooks of Edgar Degas: A Catalogue of the Thirty-Eight Notebooks in the Bibliothèque Nationale and Other Collections. 2 vols. Oxford: Clarendon Press, 1976. ISBN 0198173334. 2nd ed., revised, New York: Hacker Art Books, 1985.
- Degas: The Artist's Mind. New York: Metropolitan Museum of Art, 1976. ISBN 0870991469. 2nd ed., Cambridge: Harvard University Press, 1987.
- Cézanne: The Late Work (co-edited with William Rubin and John Rewald). New York: Museum of Modern Art, 1976. ISBN 0-87070-278-5
- Manet and Modern Paris: One Hundred Paintings, Drawings, Prints, and Photographs by Manet and His Contemporaries. Washington: National Gallery of Art, 1982. Chicago: University of Chicago Press, 1983.
- Degas et son oeuvre: A Supplement (co-authored with Philippe Brame). New York: Garland Publishing, 1984. ISBN 0-8240-5525-X (v. 5)
- Paul Cézanne: Two Sketchbooks (co-authored with Innis Howe Shoemaker). Philadelphia: Philadelphia Museum of Art, 1989.
- Manet's Incident in a Bullfight. New York: The Council of the Frick Collection, 2005.
- The Letters of Edgar Degas. 3 vols. New York: Wildenstein Plattner Institute, 2020.
