= The Suburbs (band) =

American new wave/punk band

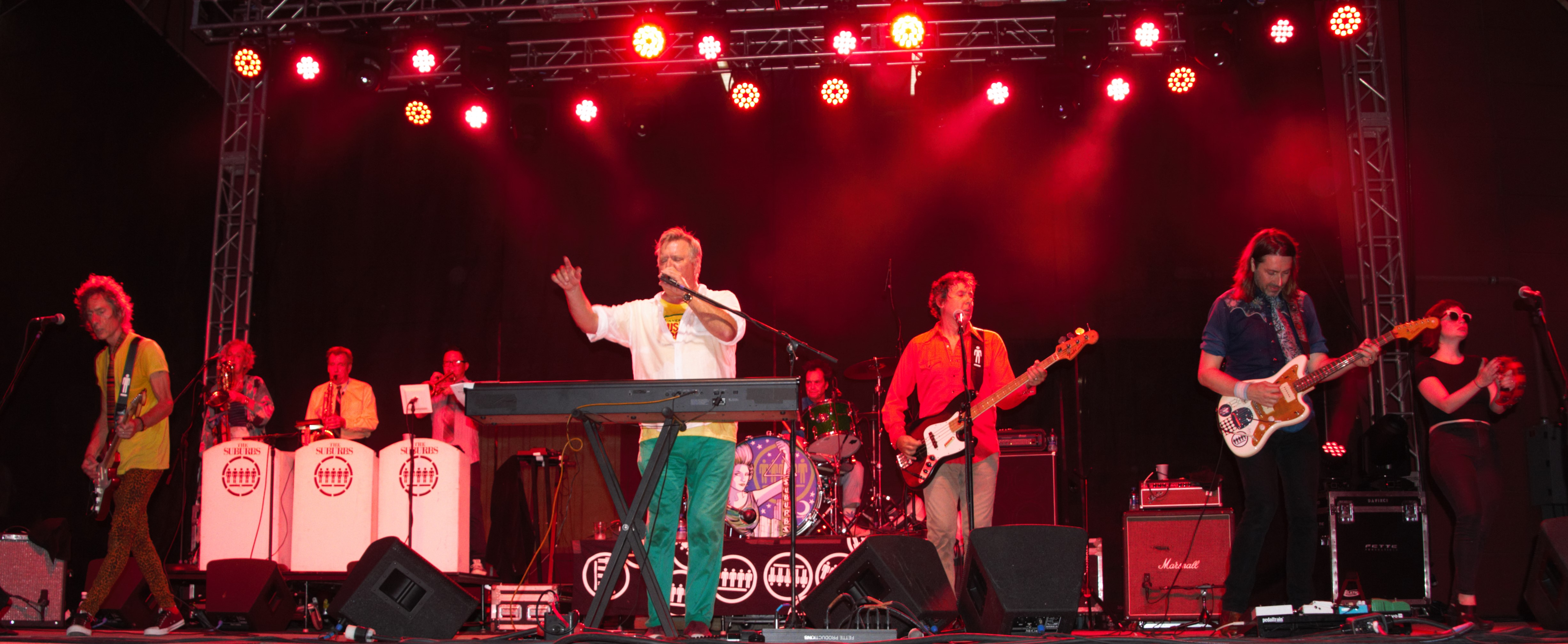
- The Suburbs in 2018

Background information
- Origin: Minneapolis, Minnesota
- Genres: Punk rock, funk, new wave
- Years active: 1977–1987, 1992–present
- Labels: Twin/Tone; PolyGram; A&M
- Spinoffs: The New Standards
- Spinoff of: The Technocats, Tsetse Flies
- Website: thesuburbsband.com

The Suburbs are an alternative punk rock/funk/new wave band from Minneapolis, Minnesota.

In its 1980s heyday, the band found great success in Minneapolis and the Midwest, and scored radio and dance-club hits with the songs "Music for Boys", "Waiting", and "Love Is the Law". The band released four albums and two EPs, including the well-regarded In Combo, Credit in Heaven, and Love Is The Law. The band frequently headlined at Minneapolis's most influential music clubs, including Jay's Longhorn Bar and First Avenue. Ira Robbins of Trouser Press called the band "one of Minneapolis’ major musical resources of the late ’70s and early ’80s".

== Band history ==
=== Pre-Suburbs: 1974–1977 ===
Keyboardist Chan Poling and guitarist Beej Chaney, who had met while high schoolers in Minneapolis, were motivated to form a band after being inspired by the punk scene in Los Angeles, where they had gone to art school in 1974. While still in Los Angeles, they formed a band called The Technocats in 1976 along with Su Tissue of post-punk band Suburban Lawns.

After returning to the western suburbs of Minneapolis the next year, Poling asked his friend Chris Osgood of Minneapolis punk band Suicide Commandos if he and Chaney could join that band. Osgood instead introduced them to drummer Hugo Klaers, guitarist Bruce Allen, and bassist Michael Halliday, who had been playing in a group called Tsetse Flies. The Suburbs were formed in November 1977.

=== Twin/Tone era and major labels: 1977–1987 ===
The Suburbs' sound crossed the sophisticated glam rock of Roxy Music and David Bowie with the rawer energy of punk-inflected groups like Talking Heads and Devo. Poling and Chaney both sang, and Chaney's unique sound on guitar came to be known by fans as "beejtar." The band's energy was described by music writer Martin Keller as the interplay between the "accomplished and often romantic" Poling and his "manic foil" Chaney. Cyn Collins, author of Complicated Fun: The Birth of Minneapolis Punk and Indie Rock, 1974–1984, described Chaney as "a riveting front man, menacing and hilarious at the same time." Chaney's quirky, unpredictable stage presence was often compared to Iggy Pop, while Trouser Press' Robbins compared Poling favorably to Bryan Ferry for his "cool in the eye of the storm."

The band released its first record, a nine-song 7-inch red vinyl EP titled The Suburbs, in early 1978. It was also the first release for Twin/Tone, which would become one of the most influential indie labels of the 1980s. The band also saw two songs, "Urban Guerrillas" and "Ailerons O.K.", included on the compilation Big Hits of Mid-America, Volume Three. Allen did the art direction for the compilation. He also created the Suburb's iconic logo, five identical generic men in a circle, seen on many of their albums, and designed Twin/Tone's logo.

After building a following playing basement parties, the Suburbs had their first major success at influential Minneapolis punk/New Wave nexus Jay's Longhorn Bar; Klaers said that after getting regular gigs at the venue, "we went from nobodies to this super popular band. It was just crazy. The Longhorn shows were always packed." One notable audience member at the Suburbs' shows was Bruce Springsteen, then on tour supporting his album The River, who was so impressed with the band that he nearly joined them on stage for an encore. The band's popularity increased during the early to mid-1980s, and during this time, their new wave dance sound, eclectic lyrics, and stage presence gained a following that broke out of the Midwest and reached both coasts. In 1980 Twin/Tone released their first full-length LP, In Combo.

The single "World War III" (and its B-side, "Change Agent") showed development of the band's songwriting abilities and improved sound. A year later, they released the double album Credit In Heaven, which added elements of jazz, funk, and disco. The single "Music for Boys" was taken from the record and became a radio hit.

In 1982, the band released the 12-inch single "Waiting", which frequently found its way onto dance club playlists. The EP Dream Hog followed on Twin/Tone, featuring three new songs and a remix of "Waiting" on the B-side, all produced by Steven Greenberg of Funkytown and Lipps Inc fame.

Greenberg then brought the Suburbs to the attention of the label Phonogram in 1983. Phonogram started by re-issuing Dream Hog on the Mercury label. Keyboardist/vocalist Chan Poling commented, "We love what Twin/Tone did for us, but we've always wanted to sell records, to join the big time, and you just can't do that on a little label." By this time, the band's live performances were muscular and funky, attracting rabid fans and keeping the band busy as an opening act for the likes of Iggy Pop and The B-52's, as well as headliners in their own right. They often went on stage wearing matching dinner jackets. In 1983 Polygram released Love is the Law, a harder-rocking album that included a horn section and some of their most off-beat lyrics, also produced by Greenberg. In 1986, The Suburbs signed with A&M Records and released The Suburbs, produced by Prince's Revolution drummer Bobby Z. (credited as Robert Brent). Frustrated by a lack of radio play and abandoned by the major labels, the band broke up in 1987.

The group was nominated for numerous Minnesota Music Awards, winning three: Best LP for Credit in Heaven in 1982, and awards for both the Love is the Law album and its title single in 1984.

=== Post-breakup and reunion: 1990–2009 ===
Chaney moved to Los Angeles in 1990. Although the Suburbs reformed in the early 1990s, Klaers noted that the physical distance between Chaney and the rest of the band contributed to Chaney's growing sense of creative dissatisfaction, as the other musicians evolved together without him: "Everything changed. It kind of put a dent in his creative juices." Although Chaney continued to play with the band, his presence diminished over time.

In 1992 Twin/Tone released Ladies and Gentlemen, The Suburbs Have Left the Building, a best-of compilation, and in 1994 a live record Viva! Suburbs!. The Suburbs reunited played numerous shows on and off in the Twin Cities, including opening for the B-52's in 2003.

In 2002, the Suburbs reissued the albums In Combo, Credit In Heaven and Love Is The Law on CD on the band's own Beejtar Records. In 2003, the band issued Chemistry Set: The Songs Of The Suburbs 1977 - 1987 (a best of CD with a few bonus tracks and a DVD of their 2002 performances at Minneapolis' First Avenue).

In 2004, Chan Poling formed The New Standards with John Munson and Steve Roehm. The jazz group's live set included rearranged melodies of Suburbs songs such as "Love Is The Law".

On December 7, 2009, guitarist Bruce Allen died at 54 after numerous health problems. Bassist Michael Halliday retired in 2009 due to arthritis.

=== Reformation and new albums: 2013–present ===
On November 19, 2013 Si Sauvage, the band's first new release in 27 years, was released. Si Sauvage featured founding members Poling, Klaers, and Chaney, plus new bandmates Steve Brantseg and Steve Price and guest vocalists Janey Winterbauer and Aby Wolf. The album grew out of the band's reunion shows in tribute to Allen.

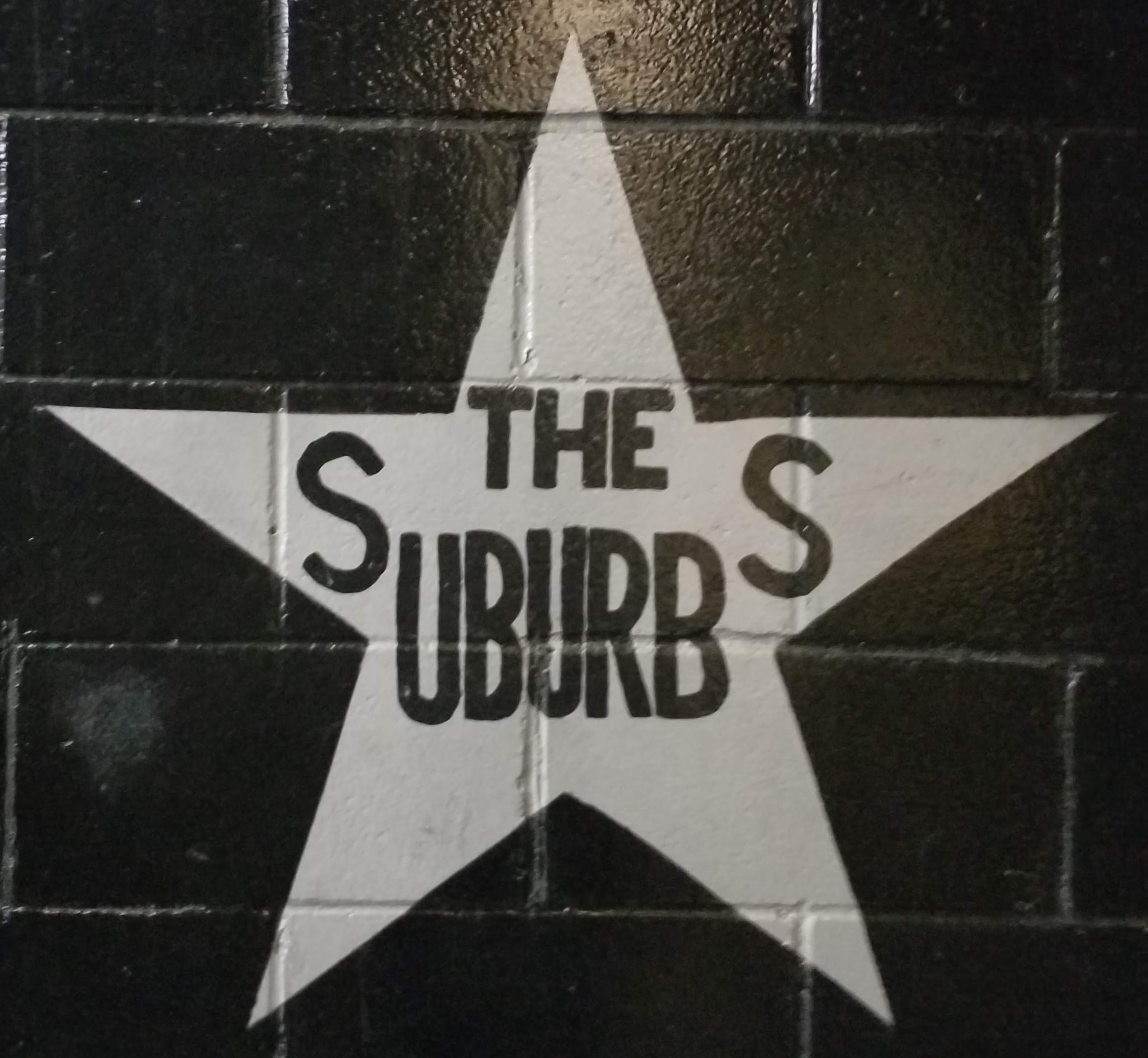
The Suburbs' star on the outside mural of the Minneapolis nightclub First Avenue

On August 26, 2014, the Suburbs announced that founding member Beej Chaney was taking a temporary leave of absence.

The band's new lineup included original members Poling and Klaers, sax player Max Ray of The Wallets, guitarists Brantseg and Jeremy Ylvisaker, bassist Steve Prince, backing vocalist Janey Winterbauer, Rochelle Becker on baritone saxophone, and Steven Kung on horns and keyboards.

The band has been honored with a star on the outside mural of the Minneapolis nightclub First Avenue, recognizing performers that have played sold-out shows or have otherwise demonstrated a major contribution to the culture at the iconic venue. Receiving a star "might be the most prestigious public honor an artist can receive in Minneapolis," according to journalist Steve Marsh.

In July 2021, the band was the first group to play First Avenue after its closure during the COVID-19 pandemic by playing two sold-out shows at the 7th Street Entry to celebrate the release of their seventh album, Poets Party.

In January 2025, Beej Chaney died while swimming in the Pacific Ocean near Hermosa Beach, California, where he had been living. Officials called the death an accident. Chaney's surviving family included three daughters. Outside of the Suburbs, Chaney also released two solo works, the 2003 album Windows and the 1992 EP Reckless Heart. He had also owned the Malibu recording studio Shangri-La from the late 1990s to 2011. Before his death, he had been working on a rockabilly/punk album called Shake It All Up with Robby Vee, the son of 1960s singer Bobby Vee. Chaney co-wrote, sang and played guitar on all the songs. The album had been due for release in early 2025.

== Members ==
=== Current lineup (2014–present) ===
- Chan Poling: Keyboards, vocals
- Hugo Klaers: Drums, vocals
- Max Ray: Saxophone
- Steve Brantseg: Guitar
- Jeremy Ylvisaker: Guitar
- Steve Price: Bass
- Janey Winterbauer: Backing vocals
- Rochelle Becker: Baritone saxophone
- Stephen Kung: Horns, keyboards

=== Classic lineup (1977–1987, 1992–2009) ===
- Chan Poling: Keyboards, vocals
- Bruce C. Allen (died 2009): Guitar, vocals
- Blaine John "Beej" Chaney (retired 2014; died 2025): Guitar (Beejtar), vocals
- Michael Halliday (retired 2009): Bass
- Hugo Klaers: Drums, vocals

== Discography ==
=== Albums ===
- In Combo (Twin/Tone 1980)
- Credit in Heaven (Twin/Tone 1981)
- Love Is The Law (Mercury/Universal 1984)
- Suburbs (A&M 1986)
- Si Sauvage (August 27, 2013)
- Hey Muse! (2017)
- Poets Party (2021)

=== EPs ===
- The Suburbs EP (Twin/Tone 1978)
- Dream Hog EP (Twin/Tone 1982)

=== Compilations and live albums ===
- Ladies and Gentlemen, The Suburbs Have Left The Building (Twin/Tone 1992)
- Viva! Suburbs! Live at First Avenue (Twin/Tone 1994)
- Chemistry Set: Songs of the Suburbs 1977–1987 (Beejtar/Universal 2003) (Best Of CD & Live DVD)
- High Fidelity Boys - Live 1979 (Garage D'or 2006)

=== Singles ===
- "World War III" (Twin/Tone 1979)
- "Music for Boys" (Twin/Tone 1982)
- "Waiting" (Twin/Tone 1982)
- "Love Is The Law" (Mercury/Universal 1984)
- "Rattle My Bones" (Mercury/Universal 1984)
- "Life Is Like" (A&M 1986)
- "#9" (A&M 1986)
- "Heart Of Gold" (A&M 1986)
- "Little Man's Gonna Fall" (Buy Records 1987)
- "Turn the Radio On" (2013)

=== Music videos ===
- "Love Is The Law"
- "Music For Boys"
- "Tape Your Wife To The Ceiling"
- "Cows"
- "Waiting"
- "#9"

== Awards ==
- The Suburbs were voted among the "100 Most Influential Minnesota Musical Entities of the Twentieth Century" by The Minneapolis Star Tribune.
- Chan Poling was voted #6 in Rake Magazine's "Favorite Minnesota Rockers" poll (alongside Prince, Bob Dylan, and Paul Westerberg).
- The Minnesota Music Awards honored Chan Poling with their POP (Perpetually Outstanding Performer) Award.

== Media ==
- In 1993, the song "Love is the Law" was featured during Darlene's prom dance scene during the season 5 episode "Promises, Promises" of the sitcom Roseanne.
- "Rattle My Bones" was featured in a television ad for Target, and is also played during Minnesota Vikings home games.

== Bibliography ==
- Jon Bream (January 27, 2002). Suburban sprawl: Musical adventurer Chan Poling makes his first solo pop CD. Star Tribune. Archived version at Chan Poling's website.
- (September 25, 2002). The Suburbs: At Long Last, the 'Burbs Return to the Cities. Pulse of the Twin Cities.
- (January 27, 2002). The Suburbs/Chan Poling discography. Minneapolis Star Tribune.
- Minneapolis Music Collection: Band Histories. Minnesota Historical Society.
- (July 12, 2011). Chan Poling talks '80s Nostalgia, the New Standards, and the possibility of a new album. Citypages
