= The Suburbs EP =

EP by The Suburbs
- Released: 1978
- Recorded: late 1977 - early 1978
- Genre: New wave
- Label: Twin/Tone Records
- Producer: Paul Stark

The Suburbs chronology
The Suburbs EP (1978)	In Combo (1980)

"The Suburbs" is a 9-song EP released by the band The Suburbs. It was the first record released by influential Minneapolis record label Twin/Tone. It was issued on red 7-inch vinyl.

== Reception ==
In his retrospective review of the Suburbs' early albums, Ira Robbins of Trouser Press called the EP "above-average punkish rock’n’roll."

== Track listing ==
7" (TTR 7801)

1. "Memory"
2. "Go"
3. "Stereo"
4. "Teenage Run-in"
5. "Chemistry Set"
6. "Your Phone"
7. "Couldn't Care Less Anymore"
8. "You"
9. "Pre-historic Jaws"
