= Anne Coffin Hanson =

American art historian

- Born: December 12, 1921; Kinston, North Carolina, US
- Died: September 3, 2004 (aged 82)
- Spouse(s): Bernard Alan Hanson (m. 1962, divorced) Warfield Garson (m. 1942, divorced)

Academic background
- Education: BFA, 1941, University of Southern California; MACA, Creative Arts, 1951, University of North Carolina at Chapel Hill; PhD, 1962, Bryn Mawr College

Academic work
- Institutions: Yale University Art Gallery; Yale University; Swarthmore College; Bryn Mawr College; Cornell University; University at Buffalo; Wagner College

Anne Coffin Hanson (December 12, 1921 – September 3, 2004) was an American art historian. She was the first woman to be hired as a fully tenured professor, serve as president of the College Art Association, and department chair at Yale University.

== Early life and education ==
Coffin Hanson was born on December 12, 1921, in Larchmont, New York, to Episcopal minister Francis Joseph Howells Coffin and mother Annie Roulhac Coffin. She then attended the University of Southern California for her bachelor of fine arts degree in painting and married Warfield Garson before graduating. As she began having children with Garson, Coffin Hanson lectured at Wagner College. She studied at the Arts Students League in New York City between 1944 and 1945 and enrolled at the University of North Carolina at Chapel Hill for her master's degree in painting.

Upon completing her MFA, and divorcing her first husband, Coffin Hanson taught at Princeton Day School between 1952 and 1955 and at the University of Buffalo. Due to her background in painting, she accepted a tentative teaching assistant position at Bryn Mawr College's graduate school while also learning Italian to complete a study in Florence for her PhD thesis on Jacopo della Quercia's Fonte Gaia.

== Career ==
Coffin Hanson completed her PhD in 1962 and accepted professorships at Swarthmore College, Cornell University, and Bryn Mawr College before joining the staff at the Museum of Modern Art (MoMA). In 1968, she was appointed Director of the Museum's International Study Center where she would "coordinate and initiate projects involving scholarly research." Two years after becoming director, Coffin Hanson became the first woman to be hired as Full professor at Yale from outside the institution.

In 1974, after completing a term as president of the College Art Association, Coffin Hanson was appointed the first female department head of any department at Yale. In 1977, she published Manet and the Modern Tradition with Yale University Press, which in 1979 won the Charles Rufus Morey Book Award for art history scholarship from the College Art Association. By 1978, Hanson was named John Hay Whitney Professor of the History of Art and later served as head of the Yale University Art Gallery. During her tenure at Yale, Coffin Hanson was a plaintiff in a lawsuit against Mory's for their male-only policy. She felt that such a policy forced female undergraduates to "miss out on what was then an integral part of a Yale undergraduate experience."

Coffin Hanson retired from Yale University in 1992 and subsequently became the Samuel H. Kress Professor at the Center for Advanced Study in the Visual Arts at the National Gallery of Art. She also published a book in 1995 titled Severini Futurista, 1912-1917. Coffin Hanson died on September 3, 2004, in New Haven.
