= The Suicide Commandos =

Punk-rock trio from Minneapolis founded in 1975

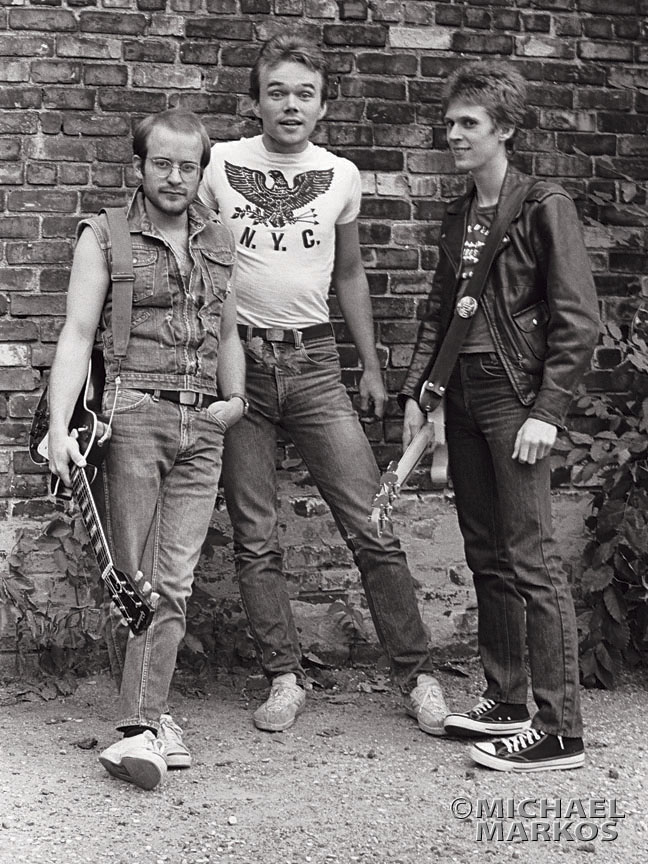
- The Suicide Commandos at the Pilot's Club, Minneapolis in 1976

Background information
- Origin: Minneapolis, Minnesota, U.S.
- Genre: Punk rock
- Years active: 1975–79; 1996–2026
- Label: Blank
- Members: Steve Almaas; Dave Ahl; Chris Osgood

The Suicide Commandos were an American punk rock trio from Minneapolis. They formed in 1975 and released two 7-inch EPs on an indie label in 1976 and 1977 before signing with Blank Records (a subsidiary label of Mercury Records) in 1977 and releasing one album, Make a Record. Despite their short original 4-year stint together, the Suicide Commandos are considered the pioneers for jump-starting a punk rock music scene in the Twin Cities, which eventually produced bands like The Suburbs, Hüsker Dü, The Replacements and Soul Asylum.

== History ==
Their first album, Make a Record, was recorded and released in 1977, and then re-released on Mercury Records on CD in 1996 and on Island/DefJam iTunes in 2007. A live album, The Suicide Commandos Commit Suicide Dance Concert was released on Twin/Tone Records in 1979, which was their last performance together before the band broke up. Only 1,000 numbered copies were pressed. In 2000, it was re-released on CD by Garage D'Or Records. The original vinyl release contained 19 tracks, while the CD re-release increased this figure, bringing the total number of tracks to 32.

Their 1977 song "Burn It Down" inspired a short film directed by rock video pioneer Chuck Statler, which featured the burning of a house the band had used for rehearsing for several years. "Burn It Down" was part of a Chuck Statler video retrospective at the Museum of Modern Art in 2006.

=== Hiatus ===
When the Commandos broke up in 1980, Almaas went to New York and formed a band called The Crackers, then issued a solo EP titled "Beat Rodeo". In 1982, Almaas formed a four-man group called (The) Beat Rodeo, which issued two well-received albums in the mid-80s before disbanding. Almaas then went solo again, issuing six albums over the next two decades.

=== Re-formation ===
The Suicide Commandos' song "Complicated Fun" was used for Target commercials for Xbox and PlayStation products in 2003–2004. The band was a headline act at the Minnesota State Fair in 2007.

Ahl and Osgood were street corner acoustic musicians in St. Paul during the 2008 Republican convention.

On January 17, 2009, the Commandos played a benefit at Nick & Eddie in Minneapolis for Laura Kennedy, bassist and founding member of the NYC no-wave band the Bush Tetras, who had recently received a liver transplant. David Thomas of Pere Ubu was guest vocalist. November 7, 2009, was declared "Suicide Commando Day" in the city of Minneapolis, MN by Mayor RT Rybak.

On January 29, 2012, the band were a co-headlining act at the 7th Birthday Party for the popular member-supported radio station, "The Current" (89.3 FM). The event was held at 1st Avenue in downtown Minneapolis and brought thousands of the most dedicated fans of the radio station together to witness an important piece of punk rock history at a legendary Minneapolis venue.

The Current released a ten-inch EP called "The Current Makes A Record" featuring studio performances by The Hold Steady and The Suicide Commandos in a limited, numbered 1,000-copy edition to celebrate their 10th Anniversary in January 2015. (Much like the limited, numbered 1000 copies of Twin/Tone Records "The Commandos Commit Suicide Dance Party"- recorded performances of the Commandos "final shows" at The Longhorn Bar, Minneapolis in December 1978.) There was a Record Release Party featuring The Commandos and Craig Finn and Tad Kubler of The Hold Steady at The Turf Club, St. Paul January 16, 2015.

On July 29, 2015, a new Hennepin County highway sign revealed that "The Suicide Commandos Punk Rock Band" had adopted a 1.5 mile stretch of Hennepin County Road 16 or McGinty Road in Minnetonka, MN.

In 2016, the Commandos recorded their first studio album in 38 years. Time Bomb was recorded by Kevin Bowe at Master Mix, Minneapolis, MN, mixed by Mitch Easter at Fidelitorium, Kernersville, NC and mastered by Bruce Templeton at Microphonic Mastering, Minneapolis, MN. Additional recording happened in West Saugerties and Chester, New York. Minneapolis's pioneering alternative music label Twin/Tone Records was revived to release "Time Bomb", the label's first release since 1994. Each member contributed four songs to the album. The thirteenth song, "If I Can't Make You Love Me" was co-written by the band. The first single, “Boogie’s Coldest Acre” became available to United States radio April 5, 2017. Twin/Tone Records began taking pre-orders April 15. 1,000 numbered copies of vinyl and downloads of the album release May 5, 2017, with Listening Party and in-store appearances that weekend.

St. Paul Mayor Chris Coleman and Minneapolis Mayor Betsy Hodges declared May 5, 2017 "Commando Day" in the Twin Cities.

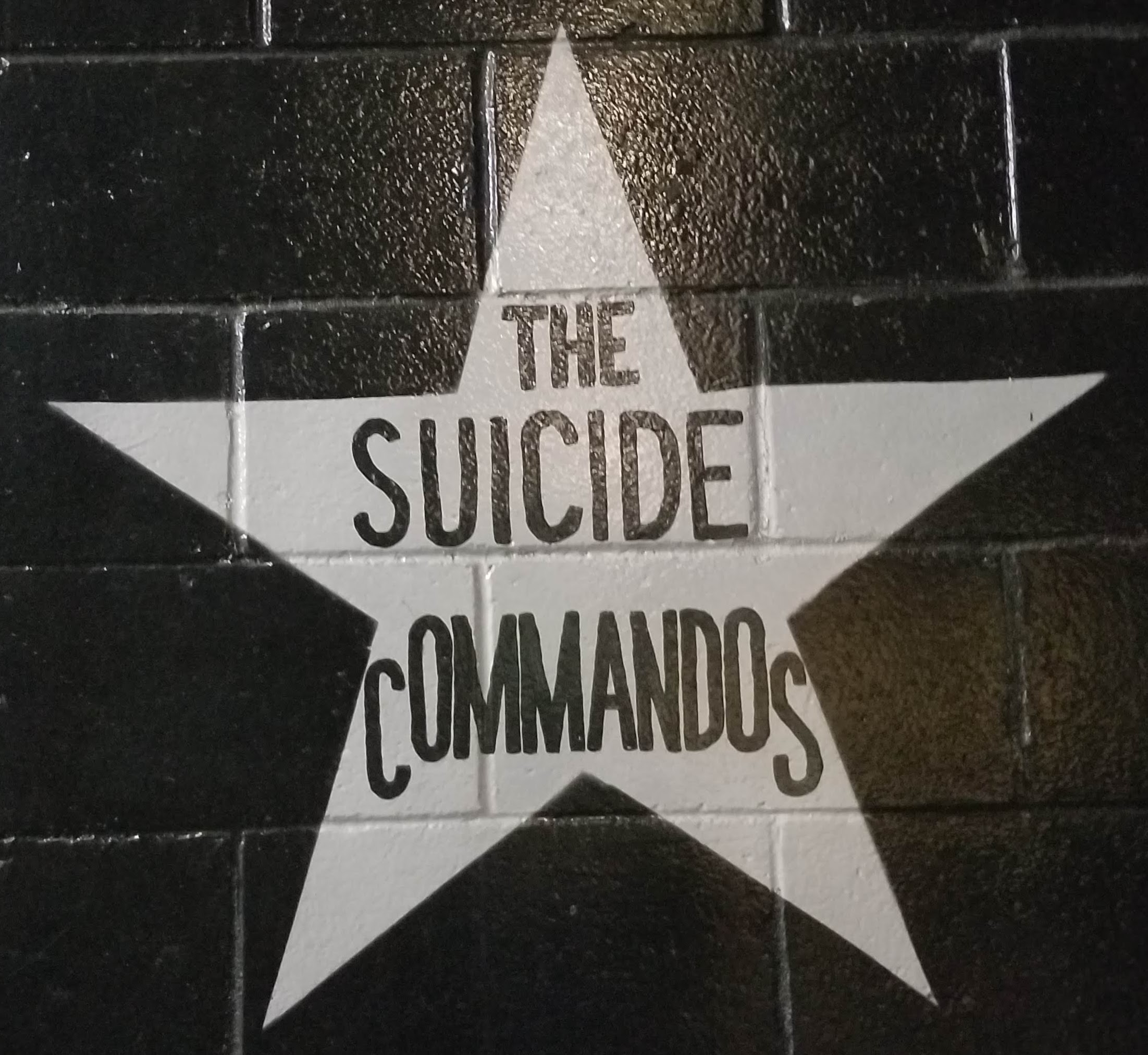
Suicide Commandos' star on the outside mural of First Avenue

The Suicide Commandos have been honored with a star on the outside mural of the Minneapolis nightclub First Avenue, recognizing performers that have played sold-out shows or have otherwise demonstrated a major contribution to the culture at the iconic venue. Receiving a star "might be the most prestigious public honor an artist can receive in Minneapolis," according to journalist Steve Marsh.

June 9, 2021, The Smithsonian issued a "Museum Moment" press release noting that Chris Osgood's Commando motorcycle jacket had been added to the collection of the National Museum of American History, as well as a "Your Pal Chris Osgood" guitar pick. Osgood’s jacket and guitar pick “speak evocatively to the establishment of a global aesthetic of punk, established in a synergy of local scenes and community movements, from the Twin Cities to New York City and London,” explains the museum’s Curator of American Music, John W. Troutman, adding that through the collection of these objects, the museum can "further develop its representation of Minneapolis’s diverse and extraordinarily significant music communities."

In 2025, the band planned a "Farewell Blowout Show," but had to postpone because of Almaas' health issues. It was rescheduled for March 2026 and was held at First Avenue. Almaas didn't play, but the other two members appeared alongside a parade of special guests, including Bob Mould, Craig Finn, and members of The Suburbs.

While the "Farewell Blowout Show" was essentially the band's final show, Osgood and Ahl played three acoustic shows at Twin Cities record stores for Record Store Day just a couple of weeks after the First Avenue gig.

Just a few months after the concert, Almaas died due to complications from recurrent cancer on June 5, 2026. He was 69.

== Members ==
- Steve Almaas – bass, vocals – he later joined Beat Rodeo (died 2026)
- Dave Ahl – drums, vocals
- Chris Osgood – guitar, vocals

== Discography ==
=== Make a Record ===
Track listing:

1. "Shock Appeal"
2. "Attacking the Beat"
3. "Mosquito Crucifixion"
4. "Mr. Dr."
5. "Semi-Smart"
6. "Call of the Wild"
7. "You Can't"
8. "I Need a Torch"
9. "Kidnapped"
10. "Premature"
11. "I Don't Get It"
12. "Real Cool"
13. "She" (a cover of The Monkees' song)
14. "Burn It Down"
15. "Match/Mismatch"
16. Mark He's A Terror - 45 Single

=== The Commandos Commit Suicide Dance Concert ===
CD Track Listing:

1. "Shake"
2. "Journey to the Center of the Mind"
3. "My Little Red Book"
4. "Back in the U.S.A."
5. "The American Ruse"
6. "It's My Life"
7. "Seven Deadly Finns"
8. "Fire"
9. "Real Good Time Together"
10. "Bits and Pieces"
11. "Emission Control"
12. "Cliché Ole"
13. "Monster Au Go Go"
14. "You Play Too Hard"
15. "I Think of You"
16. "There Goes Gladys"
17. "Keep Your Hands to Yourself"
18. "Complicated Fun"
19. "Shock Appeal"
20. "Attacking the Beat"
21. "She"
22. "She Said Yeah"
23. "I'll Wait"
24. "Mosquito Crucifixion"
25. "Three Cool Cats"
26. "Wild In the Streets"
27. "Fireball 500"
28. "You Can't"
29. "I Need a Torch"
30. "Burn It Down"
31. "O Carole / Petticoat Junction theme"
32. "Born to Be Wild"

=== The Legendary KQRS Concert 1976 ===
CDr Track Listing:

1. "Intro"
2. "Mosquito Crucifixion"
3. "The Silent Treatment"
4. "Commando Rhapsody"
5. "Premature"
6. "Call Of The Wild"
7. "Nervous Breakdown"
8. "Slow Down"
9. "Plastic Bullets"
10. "Emission Control"
11. "Wipe Out"
12. "Cliche Ole"
13. "Monster Au Go-Go"
14. "Action Woman"
15. "Bits And Pieces"
16. "I Fought The Law"
17. "Tent"
18. "Motorbikin'"
19. "Match/Mismatch"
20. "Shock Appeal"
21. "Personality Crisis"
22. "Search And Destroy"
23. "Anarchy In The U.K."

=== Time Bomb Twin/Tone Records TTR89403 ===
1. "Hallelujah Boys" (Almaas)
2. "Milk of Human Kindness" (Ahl)
3. "Boogie’s Coldest Acre" (Osgood)
4. "Try Again" (Almaas)
5. "Frogtown" (Ahl, Osgood)
6. "Pool Palace Cigar" (Osgood)
7. "When I Do It, It’s O.K." (Almaas)
8. "If I Can’t Make You Love Me" (Almaas, Ahl, Osgood)
9. "Ghost Burrito" (Osgood)
10. "For Such A Mean Time" (Almaas)
11. "Cocktail Shaker" (Ahl)
12. "The Wrong Time" (Almaas)
13. "Late Lost Stolen Mangled Misdirected" (Osgood)
14. "Boogie’s Coldest Acre" (Osgood) Radio Edit included on Radio Promo CD
