= Twin/Tone Records =

- Twin/Tone Records logo, c. 1984–present
- Founded: 1977
- Founder: Peter Jesperson; Charley Hallman; Paul Stark
- Defunct: 1994
- Genre: Alternative rock; punk
- Country of origin: U.S.
- Location: Minneapolis, Minnesota
- Official website: twintone.com

Twin/Tone Records was an independent record label based in Minneapolis, Minnesota, which operated from 1977 until 1994. It was the original home of influential Minnesota bands the Replacements and Soul Asylum and was instrumental in helping the Twin Cities music scene achieve national attention in the 1980s. Along with other independent American labels such as SST Records, Touch and Go Records, and Dischord, Twin/Tone helped to spearhead the nationwide network of underground bands that formed the pre-Nirvana indie-rock scene. These labels presided over the shift from the hardcore punk that then dominated the American underground scene to the more diverse styles of alternative rock that were emerging.

Twin/Tone originated in the Minneapolis punk rock scene. The label was begun by Peter Jesperson, music and sports writer Charley Hallman, and Paul Stark. Releases by the pop/rock group The Suburbs were both Twin/Tone's first release (The Suburbs EP in 1978) and its last (Viva! Suburbs! in 1994). The label's logo was designed by Suburbs guitarist Bruce Allen.

Jesperson signed the Replacements to the label immediately after the band's debut at the Longhorn Bar in Minneapolis. By 1984, the label had released 41 records and grown large enough to support three paid staff members, with its biggest-selling records including the Suburbs' debut and the first two discs by the Replacements. Other groups that signed with Twin/Tone include the Magnolias, Babes in Toyland, Information Society, Agitpop, the Jayhawks, Semisonic predecessor Trip Shakespeare, Poster Children, Soul Asylum, the Wallets, Curtiss A, and Pennsylvania-based Ween. British alternative-rock musician Robyn Hitchcock also released his 1990 solo album Eye through the label.

The label was headquartered at 2541 Nicollet Avenue in Minneapolis, which had previously been home to Kay Bank Studios, where garage-rock hits such as the Castaways' "Liar, Liar" and the Trashmen's "Surfin' Bird" had been recorded in the 1960s. For a time, Hüsker Dü had an office space next door to Twin/Tone at 2539. Hüsker Dü's Grant Hart would later name his first solo work, 2541, after the location.

By 1994, Twin/Tone had released more than 300 records by 100 bands and had begun to develop an umbrella relationship with several smaller, mostly Minnesota-based indie labels, including:

- TRG Records
- Hot Records
- Amphetamine Reptile Records
- Wide Angle Records
- Atomic Theory Records
- Hakatak International Records
- Boy's Life Records
- Skene! Records
- Coyote/Lost Records
- Medium Cool Records
- Clean Records
- Spanish Fly Records
- Prospective Records
- UltraModern Records
- Red Decibel Records
- No Alternative Records
- Guilt Ridden Pop Records

In 1995, Twin/Tone was recognized as a "significant regional label" by Billboard magazine. In 1998, Stark decided to stop releasing physical product in favor of digital media. The company is currently described as being "in mothballs", releasing only limited amounts of out-of-print material on custom-burned CDs, though some of the more significant material was licensed to Restless Records, part of Rykodisc. Hallman died in 2015. In 2017, the label was revived by Stark and Jesperson to release the Suicide Commandos comeback album Time Bomb.

== See also ==
- List of record labels
