= Chan Poling =

American musician and composer (born 1957)

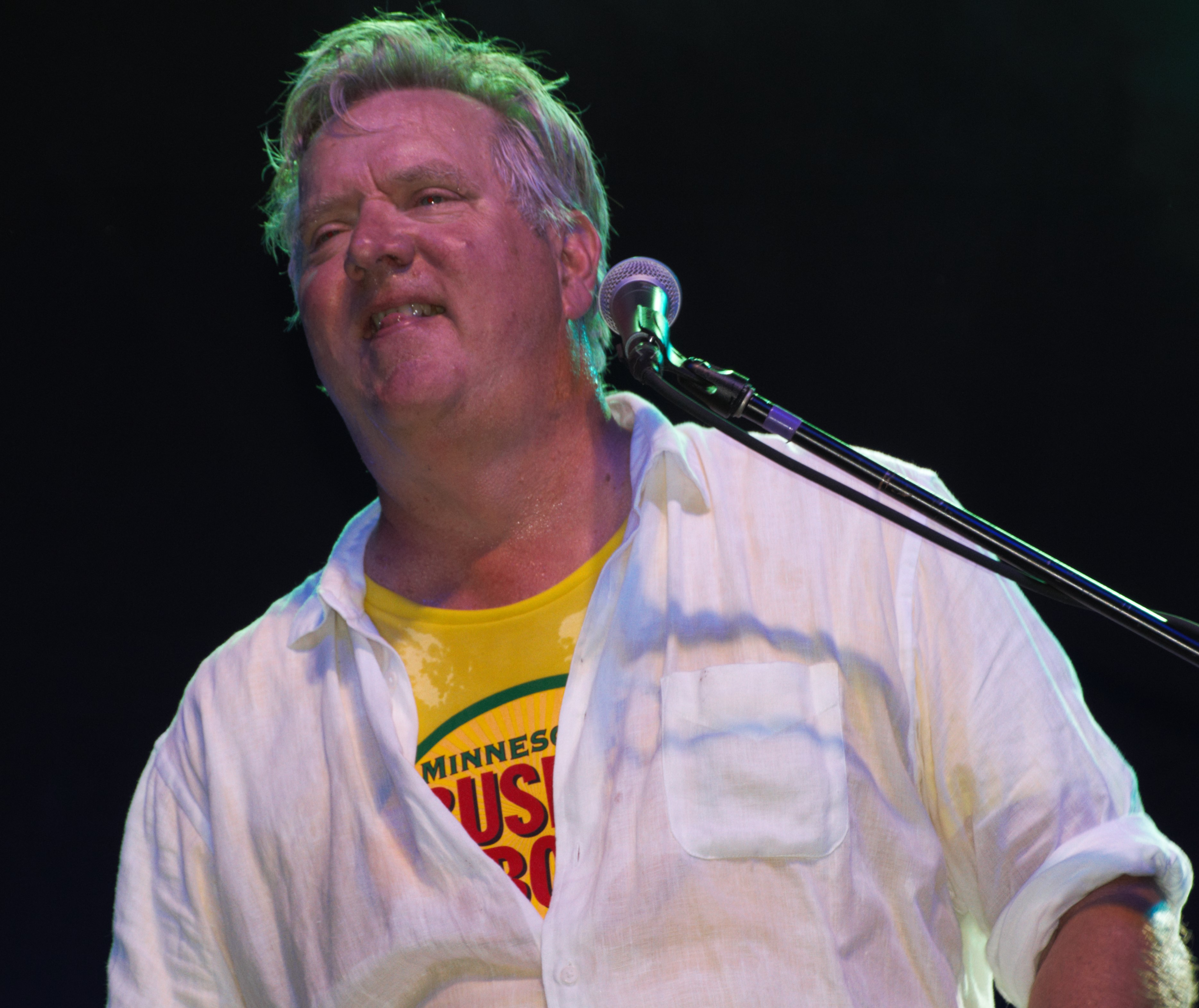
- Born: Chandler Hall Poling; October 3, 1957 (age 69); Evanston, Illinois
- Occupations: Musician, composer
- Known for: The Suburbs, The New Standards
- Notable work: Glensheen, Iron Range: A People's History
- Spouses: Terri Paul (divorced) Eleanor Mondale (m. 2005; died 2011): Patty Radford-Henderson
- Children: 3
- Relatives: Walter Mondale (father-in-law)
- Website: www.chanpolingmusic.com

Chandler Hall "Chan" Poling (born October 3, 1957) is an American musician and composer. He is best known as the leader of Minneapolis punk/New Wave group The Suburbs.

== Early life and education ==
Chandler Hall Poling was born in 1957 in Evanston, Illinois. He moved to Minnesota with his family in 1961.

He studied composition at MacPhail Center for Music in Minneapolis. He graduated from The Blake School, and met future Suburbs bandmate Beej Chaney while in high school. He went on to study composition and performance at the California Institute of the Arts from 1975 to 1977 under the tutelage of his mentor, composer Harold Budd.

== Career ==
=== Music ===
Poling has written and performed music in a variety of musical genres, including dance, theater, film, and rock. He founded, and continues to perform in the band The Suburbs. He has been influenced by jazz, music for the theater, punk and new wave pop music, film music, Harold Budd, musician, director and composer Meredith Monk, and composers such as Terry Riley and Philip Glass.

After returning to Minneapolis after attending CalArts, Poling consulted with his friend Chris Osgood of The Suicide Commandos and started the band The Suburbs with his friend Beej Chaney and new acquaintances Bruce Allen, Michael Halliday and Hugo Klaers. The Suburbs got their first recording contract with Twin/Tone Records and went on to record music for PolyGram Records, A&M Records, Universal Music, Restless Records. The Suburbs were voted among the "100 Most Influential Minnesota Musical Entities of the Twentieth Century" by the Minnesota Star Tribune.

In the 1990s Poling made two solo albums: one a record of his score for Theatre de la Jeune Lune's Children Of Paradise, and a record of off-kilter pop songs, Calling All Stars, for Manifesto Records. Reviewing Calling All Stars, Ira Robbins of Trouser Press called it "an ambitious affair, extrapolating the dark jazz noir subcurrent in the Suburbs’ tightly wound rock into a smart, moody and ironic character study."

In 2005 Poling formed The New Standards with John Munson of Semisonic and Trip Shakespeare and released a CD, The New Standards, which is composed of interpretations of a diverse collection of songwriters with Poling on grand piano, Munson on stand-up bass, and Steve Roehm on vibraphone. Trouser Press' Robbins wrote that the album "has an off-kilter charm that is both shocking and sublime."

Poling's contributions to musical theater include several scores and songs for Theatre de la Jeune Lune. He has also contributed songs to the musical "Heaven", created with Joe Chvala and continues to develop new works with Hatcher.

In the spring of 2013 Poling initiated a Kickstarter campaign to fund a new Suburbs album. The campaign was fervently supported by The Suburbs fan base. On November 19, 2013, the band’s first album in 27 years, Si Sauvage, was released. It featured founding members Poling, Klaers, and Chaney, plus new bandmates Steve Brantseg and Steve Price, and guest vocalists like Janey Winterbauer and Aby Wolf.

=== Composition ===
Poling's music credits include works for television, film and theater. His theater pieces include award-winning work for the Tony Award-winning French/American troupe Theatre de la Jeune Lune. Kevin McCollum commissioned Poling to write music for a new work "Heaven" developed under the aegis of The Ordway Theater in St. Paul, Minnesota. as well as "A Night In Olympus" book by Jeffrey Hatcher and Bill Corbett, and "Lord Gordon Gordon" both also written with Hatcher.

In 2015, the musical Glensheen (about the 1977 murders of Elisabeth Congdon and her nurse at the eponymous mansion in Duluth, Minnesota), opened at the History Theatre in St Paul. "Glensheen" was winner of an Ivey Award for Overall Excellence and continues to play to sold-out houses. There are hopes for a tour or a transfer to Off Broadway.

His score for the Twin Cities Public Television documentary Iron Range: A People's History (1994) won an Emmy Award. The TPT-produced documentary on his musical Glensheen also garnered a regional Emmy. In 2008, he also composed the score to Fritz: The Walter Mondale Story, a documentary film about the life of his father-in-law Walter Mondale.

=== Writing ===
Poling has a book from the University of Minnesota Press called Jack & the Ghost illustrated by Lucy Michell.

== Personal life ==
Poling had three children with ex-wife Terri Paul.

In 2005, he married Eleanor Mondale, daughter of former United States Vice President Walter Mondale. Until her death on September 17, 2011, they lived in Minnesota on a small farm where they raised miniature horses.

He resides now in Saint Paul, Minnesota with his partner Patty Radford-Henderson.
