= Hüsker Dü discography =

- Studio albums: 6
- Extended plays: 4
- Live albums: 3
- Compilation albums: 2
- Singles: 8
- Video albums: 1
- Music videos: 4
- Box Sets: 1
- Compilation appearances: 21

The discography of Hüsker Dü, an American punk rock band, consists of six studio albums, two live albums, one compilation album, two extended plays, and ten singles. The band was formed by Bob Mould (guitar, vocals), Grant Hart (drums, vocals), and Greg Norton (bass guitar) in January 1979. Their first album release was Land Speed Record, a live album released through New Alliance Records. The band released its first studio album, Everything Falls Apart on its own label (Reflex Records) the following year. Hüsker Dü signed with SST Records in 1983, and released its next three albums with that label. The Warner Music Group released the band's last two studio albums. Hüsker Dü broke up in January 1988. The band released 6 albums, including two double albums, between January 1983 and January 1987.

== Studio albums ==
Title	Album details	Peak chart positions				
Title	Album details	US	CAN	NZ	UK Main	UK Indie
Everything Falls Apart	Released: January 1983; Label: Reflex (REFLEX D); Format: LP	—	—	—	—	—
Zen Arcade	Released: July 1984; Labels: SST (SST 027), Aggressive (AG 0036); Formats: 2×LP, CD, CS	—	—	—	—	11
New Day Rising	Released: January 1985; Labels: SST (SST 031), Aggressive (AG 0044); Formats: LP, CD, CS	—	—	—	—	10
Flip Your Wig	Released: September 1985; Label: SST (SST 055); Formats: LP, CD, CS	—	—	—	—	1
Candy Apple Grey	Released: March 1986; Label: Warner Bros. (9 25385); Formats: LP, CD, CS	140	93	28	—	—
Warehouse: Songs and Stories	Released: January 19, 1987; Label: Warner Bros. (925 544); Formats: 2×LP, CD, CS	117	97	31	72	—

== Live albums ==
Title	Album details
Land Speed Record	Released: January 1982; Labels: New Alliance (NAR-007), Alternative Tentacles (VIRUS 25), SST (SST 195); Formats: LP, CS, CD
The Living End	Released: April 7, 1994; Labels: Warner Bros. (936245582), Rhino (8122 79926 6); Formats: CD, CS
Live Featuring J.C. (EP)	Released: 2008; Labels: Reflex; Formats: CD
Tonite Longhorn	Released: April 22, 2023; Labels: Reflex; Formats: CD, LP
1985: The Miracle Year	Released: November 2025; Label: Numero Group; Formats: 4×LP, 2×CD

== Compilation albums ==
Title	Album details
Everything Falls Apart and More	Released: January 1993; Label: Rhino (8122 71163 6); Formats: CD, CS
Do You Remember?	Released: 1994 (promotional release); Label: Warner Bros. (PRO-CD-6853); Formats: CD

== Box Sets ==
Title	Album details
Savage Young Du	Released: November 2017; Label: Numero Group; Formats: 4×LP, 3×CD

== Extended plays ==
Title	EP details
Metal Circus	Released: October 1983; Labels: Reflex (REFLEX G), SST (SST 020); Formats: 12", 10", CS, CD
Amusement	Released: April 2013 (RSD); Label: Numero Records (The Numero Group); Formats: 2×7"
Extra Circus	Released: October 2017; Label: Numero Records (The Numero Group); Formats: CD

== Singles ==
Year	Title	Album	Peak chart positions	
Year	Title	Album	UK	UK Indie
1981	"Statues"	non-album single	—	—
1982	"In A Free Land"	non-album single	—	—
1984	"Eight Miles High"	non-album single	—	—
1984	"Celebrated Summer"	New Day Rising	—	—
1985	"Makes No Sense At All"	Flip Your Wig	—	2
1986	"Don't Want To Know If You Are Lonely"	Candy Apple Grey	96	—
1986	"Sorry Somehow"	Candy Apple Grey	—	—
1987	"Could You Be The One?"	Warehouse: Songs and Stories	—	—
1987	"Ice Cold Ice"	Warehouse: Songs and Stories	—	—

== Compilation appearances ==
Year	Compilation	Song(s)	Comments
1982	Barefoot and Pregnant	"Target" "Signals From Above"	Outtake versions recorded during the In A Free Land sessions.
1982	Kitten: A Compilation	"It's Not Fair" "Everything Falls Apart" "Drug Party"	Recorded live at Goofy's Upper Deck, Minneapolis, MN 10/9/82. Last two tracks on 1999 CD reissue only.
1982	The Blasting Concept	"Real World"	
1983	Underground Hits 2	"Deadly Skies" "Lifeline"	
1984	Bang Zoom #6 (Cassette Compilation)	"Out On A Limb"	Recorded live from unknown location.
1984	Code Blue (Cassette Compilation)	"In A Free Land" "Target" "It's Not Funny Anymore"	Recorded live in Tucson, AZ 12/28/82.
1985	Department Of Enjoyment [NME 011]	"Real World"	
1985	Tellus #10 - All Guitars! (Cassette Compilation)	"Soundcheck"	Bob Mould guitar soundcheck.
1985	A Diamond Hidden In The Mouth Of A Corpse	"Won't Change"	Outtake from Metal Circus sessions.
1986	The Blasting Concept Vol. 2	"Erase Today"	Outtake from New Day Rising sessions.
1986	NME's Big Four	"Ticket To Ride"	Recorded live at First Ave, Minneapolis, MN 1/30/85.
1990	Duck and Cover	"Eight Miles High"	
1991	Never Mind the Mainstream: The Best of MTV 120 Minutes vol. 2	"Could You Be The One?"	
1991	SST Acoustic	"Never Talking To You Again"	
1993	Cash Cow - The Best of Giorno Poetry Systems 1965-1993	"Won't Change"	Outtake from Metal Circus sessions.
1993	Faster & Louder: Hardcore Punk, Vol. 1	"Statues"	
2000	Gimme Indie Rock, Vol. 1	"Pink Turns To Blue"	
2003	All That Rock	"Hardly Getting Over It"	
2004	Left of the Dial: Dispatches from the '80s Underground	"Don't Want To Know If You Are Lonely"	
2005	The Bootlegs Vol.1 - Celebrating 35 Years At First Avenue	"Books About UFOs"	Recorded live at First Ave, Minneapolis, MN 8/28/85.
2009	Adventureland: Original Motion Picture Soundtrack	"Don't Want To Know If You Are Lonely"	

== Music videos ==
- "Makes No Sense At All"/ "Love Is All Around" (1985)
- "Don't Want To Know If You Are Lonely" (1986)
- "Could You Be The One?" (1987)

== Video albums ==
- Live From The Camden Palace (Live from London UK TV show on 14 May 1985, originally released on VHS as Makes No Sense..., released on DVD on 5 February 2007)
