= The Living End (Hüsker Dü album) =

Live album by Hüsker Dü
- Released: April 7, 1994
- Recorded: October 1987
- Venue: Various locations
- Genres: Punk rock; noise
- Length: 76:44
- Label: Warner Bros.
- Producers: Hüsker Dü, Lou Giordano

Hüsker Dü chronology
Warehouse: Songs and Stories (1987)	The Living End (1994)

The Living End is a live album and final release by American punk rock band Hüsker Dü, released on April 7, 1994, by Warner Bros. Records. It was recorded at various venues throughout October 1987, but was not released until 1994.

The album's tracks span the entirety of the band's recorded output, from the band's debut album to their final album. The album also features some unreleased tracks, and a cover of the pioneering punk rock band Ramones' "Sheena Is a Punk Rocker".

The album was deleted from the Warner Bros catalogue in 2003, and reissued through Rhino Entertainment's Encore imprint in June 2008. In an interview with Spin magazine in January 2008, Bob Mould stated that he had never heard this album.

The liner notes were written by rock critic David Fricke and discuss the band's disintegration. The liner notes also mention several songs that were considered for inclusion on the album, but were left off due to space reasons.

== Recording ==
Guitarist Bob Mould and drummer Grant Hart handled the overwhelming share of songwriting duties in the band, though Greg Norton has a solo credit for "Everytime". The track listing is reflective of the band's set lists. "New Day Rising" was a common choice to open shows. As explained in the liner notes, the band preferred to group like-minded songs into what they called "packs of three." Examples of these "packs" include "Standing in the Rain" followed by "Back from Somewhere" and "Ice Cold Ice", as well as "Terms of Psychic Warfare" followed by "Powerline" and "Books About UFOs."

Over half of the songs were recorded at Le Spectrum in Montreal. Songs from seven different performances were compiled by producer and long time Husker Du sound man, Lou Giordano.

== Critical reception ==
Professional ratings
Review scores
Source	Rating
AllMusic	3/5 stars
Robert Christgau	A−
Rolling Stone	3/5 stars
The Rolling Stone Album Guide	3/5 stars

Franklin Soults of the Chicago Reader praised the album, writing that "as a recap of Hüsker Dü’s epic career, it’s more instructive and exciting than any boxed set could have been. Vividly reconstructed from several dates on the tour taped by their sound man, Lou Giordano, the record has many unexpected sequences in which the meaning of each tune is deepened by its proximity to other songs and by the intensity of the band’s seamless, full-throttle execution. It proves the thrill wasn’t all high-volume buzz and ringing overtones: this band could play." Milo Miles of The New York Times conceded that "the band's enveloping noise always eluded recording," but he argued that their "headlong dynamics and sudden bursts of roaring compassion" were well-documented in The Living End.

== Track listing ==
No.	Title	Writer(s)	Original Release	Length
1.	"New Day Rising" (Washington 10/21/87)	Bob Mould, Grant Hart, Greg Norton	New Day Rising (1985)	3:06
2.	"Girl Who Lives on Heaven Hill" (Montreal 10/14/87)	Hart	New Day Rising	3:08
3.	"Standing in the Rain" (Toronto 10/13/87)	Mould	Warehouse: Songs and Stories (1987)	3:35
4.	"Back from Somewhere" (Washington 10/20/87)	Hart	Warehouse: Songs and Stories	2:25
5.	"Ice Cold Ice" (Montreal 10/14/87)	Mould	Warehouse: Songs and Stories	4:19
6.	"Everytime" (Montreal 10/14/87)	Norton	"Could You Be the One?" single (1987)	2:39
7.	"Friend, You've Got to Fall" (Montreal 10/14/87)	Mould	Warehouse: Songs and Stories	3:11
8.	"She Floated Away" (Montreal 10/14/87)	Hart	Warehouse: Songs and Stories	3:30
9.	"From the Gut" (Providence 10/16/87)	Mould, Norton	Everything Falls Apart (1983)	1:33
10.	"Target" (Washington 10/20/87)	Mould	Everything Falls Apart	1:46
11.	"It's Not Funny Anymore" (Montreal 10/14/87)	Hart	Metal Circus (1983)	2:11
12.	"Hardly Getting Over It" (Toronto 10/13/87)	Mould	Candy Apple Grey (1986)	5:54
13.	"Terms of Psychic Warfare" (Montreal 10/14/87)	Hart	New Day Rising	2:01
14.	"Powerline" (Montreal 10/14/87)	Mould	New Day Rising	2:27
15.	"Books About UFOs" (Montreal 10/14/87)	Hart	New Day Rising	2:25
16.	"Divide and Conquer" (Montreal 10/14/87)	Mould	Flip Your Wig (1985)	2:56
17.	"Keep Hanging On" (New York City 10/17/87)	Hart	Flip Your Wig	3:23
18.	"Celebrated Summer" (Montreal 10/14/87)	Mould	New Day Rising	4:36
19.	"Now That You Know Me" (Montreal 10/14/87)	Hart	unreleased; later appeared on the Grant Hart album Intolerance (1989)	3:31
20.	"Ain't No Water in the Well" (Toronto 10/13/87)	Mould	unreleased	2:47
21.	"What's Going On" (New Haven 10/18/87)	Hart	Zen Arcade (1984)	3:21
22.	"Data Control" (Providence 10/16/87)	Hart	Land Speed Record (1982)	5:09
23.	"In a Free Land" (Toronto 10/13/87)	Mould	"In a Free Land" single (1982)	3:35
24.	"Sheena Is a Punk Rocker" (Montreal 10/14/87)	Joey Ramone, Johnny Ramone, Dee Dee Ramone, Tommy Ramone	Ramones cover	3:13

== Personnel ==
Credits adapted from the album's liner notes.

Hüsker Dü

- Bob Mould – guitar, vocals
- Greg Norton – bass, vocals
- Grant Hart – drums, vocals

Technical

- Hüsker Dü – producer
- Lou Giordano – producer, engineer, sequencing, editing
- Howie Weinberg – mastering
- Fake Name Graphx – art direction
- Kirsten Turbenson – artwork
- Daniel Corrigan – photography
- Doug Myren – project coordinator
