= Savage Young Dü =

Box set by Hüsker Dü
- Released: November 10, 2017
- Recorded: May 1979 – December 1982
- Genres: Hardcore punk; post-punk
- Length: 2:42:10
- Label: Numero Group
- Producers: Hüsker Dü; Spot; Colin Mansfield; Steve Fjelstad

Hüsker Dü chronology
Live Featuring J.C. (2008)	Savage Young Dü (2017)

Savage Young Dü is a three-CD/four-LP box set by American rock band Hüsker Dü, released by Numero Group in 2017. It spans the band's first four years, from 1979 to 1982, and contains demos, studio and live recordings remastered from original session masters and soundboard tapes. 47 of the set's 69 tracks are previously unissued, of which some are never-before-heard songs. The set includes a remix of the "In a Free Land" single, a remastered Everything Falls Apart, and an alternate Land Speed Record. A limited edition included the Extra Circus 7" with four previously unreleased outtakes from the Metal Circus sessions.

The set also includes a 108-page hard cover book containing unreleased photographs, tour history, flyerography, a sessionography by Hüsker Dü archivist Paul Hilcoff, and a comprehensive essay by music journalist Erin Osman.

== Background ==
While still in print, Hüsker Dü's back catalog had for the most part not been remastered or reissued by the 2010s, a result of both poor relations between band members and legal issues with one of the band's former labels, SST Records. For many years a project such as Savage Young Dü was therefore doubtful, but in 2010, the Chicago-based reissue label Numero Group began the process of putting together a Hüsker Dü box set. Ken Shipley, cofounder of the Numero Group, had been told that the best way to go about a Hüsker Dü box set was to convince Hüsker Dü drummer and co-vocalist Grant Hart first, "because he’d be the most difficult person to convince," Shipley told New Noise Magazine in 2017. "That took a herculean amount of effort."

With all three former Hüsker Dü members on board, the band first explored a working relationship with Numero Group by letting them reissue the 1981 single "Statues"/"Amusement" for Record Store Day in 2013. The label then picked around 100 songs for inclusion in the box set before narrowing it down to 69. Focusing on the period between 1979 and 1982, Savage Young Dü includes live tapes from the extensive collection of Terry Katzman, who co-founded Reflex Records with Hüsker Dü and was the band's live sound engineer until 1985. Most of the tapes used in the box set came from Katzman, who documented almost every live show the band did, going back to the very end of 1979. "We tried to capture every song they wrote, the best performances," Shipley said. "A lot of this stuff was never recorded in a studio. There were tons of rehearsal tapes and soundchecks." The band also had a tape archive in an old storage space, according to Shipley. "Once we were able to get that material, it really opened the doors for what was possible. For years, I'd been told that the master tapes for "Statues" and "Amusement" were lost, and lo and behold, here's the original multitracks, mixdowns, and all the additional stuff they recorded in the sessions. That kept happening. Every time we opened up a box, we found something new," he said.

The band members followed the progress of the project through email with Shipley and others at Numero Group. "Having all three of them together at one point in time with a common goal, that hadn't happened since 1987," Shipley said. In 2016, Hart was diagnosed with liver cancer and died just two months before the release of the box set in September 2017. "I'm super bummed that we didn't even get a finished copy to him," Shipley said. "We had one finished copy, and we were too busy shooting the photos. If I had known that was going to be it, I would have at least driven it up to him so he could have seen it."

Bassist Greg Norton said in 2017: "When I listen to our early stuff now, I'm blown away by the sheer energy of it ... It holds up pretty well." He added, "It's things that fell to the wayside as the band evolved, but there was a lot of good cuts that got abandoned." Norton praised ex-bandmates Bob Mould and Grant Hart, saying they were two of the greatest songwriters of his generation, and that you can hear the beginnings of that on Savage Young Dü. He called "Private Hell," among the collection's 10 never-before-heard songs, "one of my all-time favorite songs Bob wrote."

== Critical reception ==
Professional ratings
Aggregate scores
Source	Rating
Metacritic	90/100
Review scores
Source	Rating
AllMusic	4.5/5 stars
The Austin Chronicle	3.5/5 stars
Chicago Tribune	3.5/4 stars
Flood Magazine	8/10
The Guardian	4/5 stars
The Line of Best Fit	10/10
Mojo	4/5 stars
Pitchfork	9.0/10
Record Collector	4/5 stars
Uncut	4/5 stars

Savage Young Dü was well received by music critics, with a 90/100 score on Metacritic based on 12 critic reviews. The Post-Trash website wrote that the box set "provides a breathing document of the band's early years, moving from amateur mimics to a groundbreaking force." The Guardian called it a "beautifully curated set" that "reveals a band already sporting an advanced case of split musical personality: Midwestern punk rockers unsure whether they wanted to scream their way through songs called "Obnoxious" and "Guns at My School" or do something more thoughtful and arty and strange."

Record Collector wrote that "the sound quality fluctuates, but that’s largely irrelevant for there’s a veritable trove of unfamiliar treasure to trawl through here." Pitchfork noted that "a different band could have built a career solely off the songs Hüsker Dü routinely discarded." They added that "even in unvarnished recordings, some of the earliest tracks here ... show an attention to and ease with pop songcraft that later became a hallmark."

The Line of Best Fit called it "one of the best archival compilations of the year," and Magnet wrote: "As impressive as Savage Young Dü is as a musical release ... it’s equally impressive as a historical document," calling it "one of 2017's essential releases."

The Quietus and the Wire both felt that while fans will find things to love on Savage Young Dü, it is not a starting point for new fans.

== Content ==
Demos and live recordings

These feature tracks from Hüsker Dü's very first demo recordings in 1979 and live recordings made between 1979 and 1982. They include a rehearsal room recording of the Ramones' "Chinese Rocks" and a soundcheck recording of an embryonic "Wheels" as well as never-before-heard songs. Some live recordings were taped from the soundboard, others were usually recorded by Terry Katzman using two microphones placed around the room, as it would be difficult to record off the soundboard because of the band's loud volume.

Alternate Land Speed Record

Hüsker Dü's 1982 debut album Land Speed Record was taken from the first of two sets the band played on August 15, 1981 at 7th St Entry in Minneapolis. "The original tape was apparently stolen out of the band's van at some point," Ken Shipley said, "there's no way to really go back." The second set from August 15, from which the original tape still exists, is represented by five songs at the end of disc two. With the poor sound quality of the existing versions of Land Speed Record, due to what Shipley believes is a multitrack copy and a mixdown that's "probably two or three generations old," Numero Group decided to use an alternate version on the box set. They found a tape of a set for a Twin/Tone showcase two weeks later on September 5 where the band basically played the exact same set. "They're even better than they were two weeks earlier," Shipley said. "And the soundboard tape was way better. It was just a marked improvement over Land Speed Record. We said, "Let's do a better version of it." All tracks have also finally been separated, as the original 1987 CD reissue contains only two tracks, one for each side of the original vinyl album.

"Statues/Amusements", "In a Free Land" and Everything Falls Apart

In 2013, Numero Group reissued the band's 1981 debut single "Statues/Amusements" with the studio outtakes "Writer's Cramp" and "Let's Go Die" as a 7" pairing. All four tracks have been included on Savage Young Dü. The studio recordings are remastered from a first-generation sub-master, while "Amusement" is from the original live board tape. Numero Group remixed all three tracks of the 1982 "In a Free Land" single, since a master couldn't be found. Compared to the original mix, "it's just so much brighter," Shipley said. Also included on Savage Young Dü are two outtakes from the "In a Free Land" sessions, "Target" and "Signals from Above", which were originally released on the various artists compilation cassette Barefoot and Pregnant in 1982. They were subsequently rerecorded for Hüsker Dü's first studio album Everything Falls Apart, released in January 1983. Everything Falls Apart has been given a new remastering for the box set that Shipley feels "blows the original out of the water."

Extra Circus cover

Extra Circus

First put out as a limited edition bonus 7" available with pre-orders of Savage Young Dü, the five track Extra Circus was also made available for digital download and as a limited edition CD available from Numero Groups' website. It contains all outtakes from the Metal Circus sessions, recorded in December 1982 and January 1983. A safety master, thought to be lost, turned up while assembling material for Savage Young Dü. Several of the tracks have appeared on bootlegs over the years.

The cover photograph for Extra Circus is a color negative for the Metal Circus cover, which was in black and white. Shot by Grant Hart in the office of Revolution guitarist Dez Dickerson's father in downtown Saint Paul, Minnesota, the desk is a visual representation of Hüsker Dü's discography to date; the photo of Mao Zedong references the cover of "Statues/Amusements", the Statue of Liberty calendar represents "In a Free Land", and barely visible on the desk is the logo that appears on the back cover of Everything Falls Apart. Also, the catalog number for Land Speed Record, NAR007, is printed on the plane's wing. Hart said that it was the most satisfying graphics project he ever did for Hüsker Dü. "By the time it was all set up, I had to race the sun and deal with drunken street revelers getting in the way of the shot," he said. "The shoot was on Saint Patrick's Day, and there were a ton of throw aways where you can see the tips of those party horns entering the frame."

== Album cover and title ==
The cover photograph used for Savage Young Dü was taken c. 1979 by amateur photographer Steve Hengstler, a college friend of Bob Mould's. Hengstler's photos, publicity shots taken in St. Paul and photos from live shows, are on the cover of the box set and in its companion book. Hengstler decided early on to photograph Hüsker Dü as an up-and-coming band and followed them to gigs. Minnesota Public Radio personality Mary Lucia called it "primitive rock photography at its very best." Photos taken by Hengstler were used for the cover of Andrew Earles' 2010 book Hüsker Dü: The Story of the Noise-Pop Pioneers Who Launched Modern Rock, in Gorman Bechard's 2013 film documentary, Every Everything: The Music, Life & Times of Grant Hart, as well as in Bob Mould's 2011 autobiography, See a Little Light: The Trail of Rage and Melody, and on the cover of Mould's 2014 album, Beauty & Ruin. Hengstler died in 2004 at age 43 of cancer.

The title Savage Young Dü is taken from an early cassette tape of Hüsker Dü demos from 1979-1980. It was Grant Hart's informal designation, a reference to the Beatles bootleg The Savage Young Beatles.

== Track listing ==
Adapted from the album's liner notes. Tracks with (*) asterisk are previously unreleased.

All tracks are written by Bob Mould, except where noted.

Disc one
No.	Title	Writer(s)	Origin / recording date	Length
1.	"Do You Remember?" (Demo) (*)		Late 1979	1:56
2.	"Sore Eyes" (Demo) (*)		Late 1979	2:19
3.	"Can't See You Anymore" (Demo) (*)		Late 1979	3:49
4.	"Picture of You" (Demo) (*)	Greg Norton	Late 1979	2:00
5.	"The Truth Hurts" (Demo) (*)	Norton	Late 1979	3:47
6.	"Do the Bee" (Demo) (*)	Grant Hart	May 1979	2:42
7.	"Nuclear Nightmare" (Demo) (*)	Hart, Mould, Norton	May 1979	3:25
8.	"All I've Got to Lose Is You" (Demo) (*)		Late 1979	2:32
9.	"Chinese Rocks" (Live rehearsal) (*)	Dee Dee Ramone, Richard Hell	January 9, 1980	2:05
10.	"Uncle Ron" (Live rehearsal) (*)	Norton	January 9, 1980	2:47
11.	"Data Control" (Live rehearsal) (*)	Hart	January 9, 1980	6:47
12.	"Insects Rule the World" (Live) (*)	Hart	July 13, 1979	1:53
13.	"You're Too Obtuse" (Live) (*)	Norton	July 13, 1979	1:51
14.	"Outside" (Live) (*)		February 3, 1980	2:57
15.	"Sexual Economics" (Live) (*)		May 3, 1980	2:16
16.	"What Went Wrong?" (Live) (*)		May 3, 1980	2:14
17.	"Statues"	Hart	Non-album single, 1981	4:25
18.	"Amusement" (Live)		Non-album single, 1981	4:54
19.	"Writer's Cramp"		B-side of "Amusement" reissue single, 2013; "Statues" session outtake, June 1980	2:25
20.	"Let's Go Die"	Norton	B-side of "Amusement" reissue single; "Statues" session outtake	1:52
21.	"Walk With the Wounded" (Live) (*)		October 27, 1980	2:56
22.	"Industrial Grocery Store" (Live) (*)		July 30, 1980	2:18
Total length:				64:24

Disc two
No.	Title	Writer(s)	Origin / recording date	Length
1.	"Drug Party" (Live) (*)		November 6, 1980	4:22
2.	"Call on Me" (Live) (*)		November 6, 1980	3:13
3.	"Termination" (Live) (*)	Norton	November 6, 1980	5:00
4.	"I’m Tired of Doing Things" (Live) (*)	Hart	November 6, 1980	1:27
5.	"Stick It to Me" (Soundcheck) (*)		September 4, 1980	3:36
6.	"Wheels" (Soundcheck) (*)	Hart	September 4, 1980	4:19
7.	"All Tensed Up" (Live) (*)		September 5, 1981	2:01
8.	"Don't Try to Call" (Live) (*)		September 5, 1981	1:27
9.	"I’m Not Interested" (Live) (*)	Hart	September 5, 1981	1:31
10.	"Guns at My School" (Live) (*)		September 5, 1981	0:55
11.	"Push the Button" (Live) (*)	Hart	September 5, 1981	1:48
12.	"Gilligan's Island" (Live) (*)	Hart	September 5, 1981	1:15
13.	"MTC" (Live) (*)	Norton	September 5, 1981	1:41
14.	"Don't Have a Life" (Live) (*)	Norton	September 5, 1981	1:52
15.	"You're Naive" (Live) (*)		September 5, 1981	0:48
16.	"Strange Week" (Live) (*)	Hart	September 5, 1981	1:02
17.	"Big Sky" (Live) (*)		September 5, 1981	0:55
18.	"Ultracore" (Live) (*)		September 5, 1981	0:47
19.	"Let's Go Die" (Live) (*)	Norton	September 5, 1981	1:51
20.	"Won't Say a Word" (Live) (*)		August 15, 1981	2:08
21.	"Don't Try It" (Live) (*)		August 15, 1981	2:03
22.	"Private Hell" (Live) (*)		August 15, 1981	2:55
23.	"Diane" (Live) (*)	Hart	August 15, 1981	4:05
24.	"Sex Dolls" (Live) (*)	Hart	August 15, 1981	1:28
Total length:				52:45

Disc three
No.	Title	Writer(s)	Origin / recording date	Length
1.	"In a Free Land"		Non-album single, 1982	2:53
2.	"What Do I Want?"	Hart	B-side of "In a Free Land" single	1:16
3.	"M.I.C."		B-side of "In a Free Land" single	1:06
4.	"Target" ("In a Free Land" sessions)		Barefoot and Pregnant, 1982 (Note: Barefoot and Pregnant; Various artists compilation cassette, released by Reflex Records, 1982.)	1:50
5.	"Signals from Above" ("In a Free Land" sessions)		Barefoot and Pregnant	1:40
6.	"From the Gut"	Mould, Norton	Everything Falls Apart, 1983	1:40
7.	"Blah, Blah, Blah"	Mould, Norton	Everything Falls Apart	2:10
8.	"Punch Drunk"		Everything Falls Apart	0:32
9.	"Bricklayer"		Everything Falls Apart	0:34
10.	"Afraid of Being Wrong"		Everything Falls Apart	1:23
11.	"Sunshine Superman"	Donovan Leitch	Everything Falls Apart	1:51
12.	"Signals from Above"		Everything Falls Apart	1:38
13.	"Everything Falls Apart"		Everything Falls Apart	2:12
14.	"Wheels"	Hart	Everything Falls Apart	2:08
15.	"Target"		Everything Falls Apart	1:43
16.	"Obnoxious"		Everything Falls Apart	0:53
17.	"Gravity"		Everything Falls Apart	2:38
18.	"Do You Remember?" (Live) (*)		July 25, 1981	1:20
19.	"Travel in the Opposite Car" (Live) (*)		July 25, 1981	1:58
20.	"It's Not Funny Anymore" (Live) (*)	Hart	December 28, 1982	2:12
21.	"Real World" (Live) (*)		December 28, 1982	2:35
22.	"Out on a Limb" (Live) (*)		December 28, 1982	2:57
23.	"It's Not Fair" (Live)		Kitten, 1982; (Note: Kitten; Various artists compilation cassette, released by Reflex Records, 1982.) recorded October 9, 1982	6:16
Total length:				45:40

Extra Circus 7"
No.	Title	Writer(s)	Origin / recording date	Length
1.	"Heavy Handed" (*)		Metal Circus outtake; December 1982 - January 1983	0:41
2.	"You Think I'm Scared" (*)		Metal Circus outtake	0:51
3.	"Won't Change"		A Diamond Hidden in the Mouth of a Corpse, 1985; Metal Circus outtake	1:54
4.	"Is Today the Day?" (*)	Norton	Metal Circus outtake	0:47
5.	"Standing by the Sea" (*)	Hart	Metal Circus outtake	3:20
Total length:				7:37

== Production notes ==
Disc one

- 1-5, 8 (The "Northern Lights Sessions") recorded by Colin Mansfield on four-track in the basement at Northern Lights Records, Saint Paul, Minnesota, late 1979
- 6, 7 (The "Bill Bruce Session") recorded live by Bill Bruce and Chris Osgood at the Janet Wallace Fine Arts Center, Saint Paul; backing vocals recorded at Bill Bruce's studio, Arden Hills, Minnesota, May 1979
- 9-11 (The "Oo La Rü Session") recorded by Henry LaBounta on a TEAC cassette deck in the basement at Northern Lights Records, Saint Paul, January 9, 1980
- 12, 13 recorded live by Terry Katzman at Jay's Longhorn, Minneapolis, Minnesota, July 13, 1979
- 14 recorded live by Terry Katzman at 7th St Entry, Minneapolis, February 3, 1980
- 15, 16 recorded live by Terry Katzman at 7th St Entry, Minneapolis, May 3, 1980
- 17, 19, 20 ("Statues" sessions) recorded at Blackberry Way, Minneapolis, June 1980
- 18, 21 recorded live by Terry Katzman at Duffy's, Minneapolis, October 27, 1980
- 22 recorded live by Terry Katzman at Sam's, Minneapolis, July 30, 1980

Disc two

- 1-4 recorded live at Zoogies, Minneapolis, November 6, 1980
- 5, 6 soundcheck/rehearsal recorded by Terry Katzman at 7th St Entry, Minneapolis, September 4, 1980
- 7-19 recorded live by Paul Stark at 7th St Entry, Minneapolis, September 5, 1981
- 20-24 recorded live at 7th St Entry, Minneapolis, August 15, 1981

Disc three

- 1-5 ("In a Free Land" sessions) recorded at Blackberry Way, Minneapolis, February 17, 1982
- 6-17 (Everything Falls Apart) recorded at Total Access Recording, Redondo Beach, California, June–July 1982
- 18, 19 recorded live by Terry Hammer at Mabuhay Gardens, San Francisco, California, July 25, 1981
- 20-22 recorded live at Backstage, Tucson, Arizona, December 28, 1982
- 23 recorded live by Terry Katzman at Goofy's Upper Deck, Minneapolis, October 9, 1982

Extra Circus

- Metal Circus outtakes, recorded at Total Access Recording, Redondo Beach, December 1982 - January 1983.

== Personnel ==
Liner notes adapted from the album sleeve.

Hüsker Dü

- Bob Mould – vocals, guitar, drums on "Wheels" (soundcheck)
- Grant Hart – vocals, drums, keyboards on "Wheels" (soundcheck)
- Greg Norton – vocals, bass

Hümper Dü Boys Choir

- Robin Henley – backing vocals on Everything Falls Apart
- Steve "Mugger" Corbin – backing vocals on Everything Falls Apart
- Merrill Ward – backing vocals on Everything Falls Apart

Technical

- Hüsker Dü – producer ("Statues" sessions, "In a Free Land" sessions, Everything Falls Apart and "Extra Circus")
- Colin Mansfield – producer ("Statues" sessions), engineer ("Amusement")
- Steve Fjelstad – producer ("In a Free Land" sessions), engineer ("Statues" sessions, "Amusement" and "In a Free Land" sessions)
- Spot – producer, engineer (Everything Falls Apart and "Extra Circus")

Reissue

- Adam Luksetich – reissue producer
- Dennis Pelowski – reissue producer
- Rob Sevier – reissue producer
- Ken Shipley – reissue producer
- Jeff Lipton – mastering
- Maria Rice – assistant mastering engineer
- Taylor Hales – additional mixing
- James Hughes – editing
- Henry H. Owings – design
- Jaycee Rockhold – transcription
- Erin Osmon – liner notes
- Paul Hilcoff – liner notes
