= Amusement (song) =

Single by Hüsker Dü
- A-side: "Statues"
- Released: January 1981
- Recorded: October 1980
- Venue: Duffy's, Minneapolis, Minnesota
- Genre: Punk rock, post-punk
- Length: 4:19
- Label: Reflex Records
- Songwriter(s): Bob Mould
- Producer(s): Hüsker Dü

Hüsker Dü singles chronology
| "Amusement" (1981) | "In a Free Land" (1982) |

"Amusement" is a song by Hüsker Dü released as a single in 1981. It was the band's first single, b/w the song "Statues." This release finds the band in a period where its music was drifting from punk to post-punk. The single's pressing was limited to 2,000 copies upon its release. The two tracks appear on the Everything Falls Apart and More CD.

In 2013, the Numero Group reissued the single with the studio outtakes "Writer's Cramp" and "Let's Go Die" as a 7" pairing in a gatefold jacket. The studio recordings are remastered from a first-generation sub-master, while "Amusement" is from the original live board tape. The cover features drummer Grant Hart's original Fake Name Graphx artwork.

== Track listing ==
| No. | Title | Writer(s) | Length |
|---|---|---|---|
| 1. | "Statues" | Grant Hart | 4:14 |
| 2. | "Amusement" | Bob Mould | 4:19 |

=== 2013 reissue track listing ===
Disc 1
| No. | Title | Writer(s) | Length |
|---|---|---|---|
| 1. | "Statues" | Hart | 4:29 |
| 2. | "Amusement" | Mould | 4:19 |

Disc 2
| No. | Title | Writer(s) | Length |
|---|---|---|---|
| 1. | "Writers Cramp" | Mould | 2:39 |
| 2. | "Let’s Go Die" | Greg Norton | 1:55 |

Notes

- "Statues", "Writers Cramp" and "Let’s Go Die" were recorded at Blackberry Way, Minneapolis, August 1980
- "Amusement" was recorded live at Duffy's, Minneapolis, October 1980

== Personnel ==
Adapted from the liner notes of Everything Falls Apart and More.

Hüsker Dü

- Bob Mould – guitar, vocals,
- Grant Hart – drums, vocals
- Greg Norton – bass, vocals

Technical

- Hüsker Dü – producer (all tracks)
- Colin Mansfield – producer ("Statues", "Writers Cramp", "Let’s Go Die"), engineer ("Amusement")
- Steve Fjelstad – engineer (all tracks)
- Terry Katzman – recorded by ("Amusement")
- Fake Name Graphx – artwork
