= Joseph Ture Jr. =

American serial killer, serial rapist, mass murderer, and kidnapper (born 1951)

- Born: Joseph Donald Ture Jr. February 7, 1951 (age 75); St. Paul, Minnesota, U.S.
- Convictions: First-degree murder (6 counts); Rape (3 counts); Kidnapping (2 counts); Attempted rape; Attempted kidnapping
- Penalty: Life imprisonment (6 sentences)

Details
- Victims: 6–7+
- Span of crimes: December 15, 1978 – September 26, 1980
- Country: United States
- State: Minnesota
- Date apprehended: October 30, 1980
- Imprisoned at: Minnesota Correctional Facility – Stillwater, Bayport, Minnesota

Joseph Donald Ture Jr. (born February 7, 1951) is an American serial killer, serial rapist, mass murderer, and kidnapper who committed at least six murders in central Minnesota from 1978 to 1980. He murdered four members of the Huling family in Clearwater during a burglary of their residence in December 1978, followed by the sexual assault and murder of two female college students in the Minneapolis–Saint Paul area in 1979 and 1980. He is currently serving six life sentences at MCF Stillwater in Bayport, Minnesota.

== Early life ==
Joseph Donald Ture Jr. was born on February 7, 1951, in St. Paul, Minnesota. His parents divorced when he was 10, and his father won custody of him, though he was primarily raised in an orphanage. In his late teens, he joined the U.S. Marine Corps, but stayed for only about six months before returning to the St. Paul area, where he held many low-skilled jobs. He was barely able to afford proper living conditions, and reportedly he spent some time living in his car.

== Known crimes ==
- On the morning of December 15, 1978, Ture entered the home of Alice Huling, 36, in Clearwater. He fatally shot Alice with a shotgun before ascending to her children's bedrooms and tying them up before shooting them; 16-year-old Susan, 12-year-old Patti, and 13-year-old Wayne, were killed, while a fourth child, 11-year-old William "Billy", survived. Four days after the murders, Ture was arrested at a pizzeria for auto theft.
- On May 8, 1979, Marlys Ann Wohlenhaus, 18, returned home after attending school. Ture, who had broken in and waited for her to come home, attacked and sexually assaulted Wohlenhaus before viciously beating her to death with a blunt instrument. Later that day, Marlys' mother discovered her body. That same year and 1980, three teenage girls were lured into a man's car during separate incidents, resulting in each of them being raped.
- On September 26, 1980, Ture abducted 19-year-old Diane Edwards, a University of Minnesota student, while she was walking home from her job as a waitress at a nearby Perkins Restaurant in West St. Paul. He took her to the nearby woods, where he sexually assaulted and stabbed her to death.

=== Arrest and incarceration ===
On October 30, 1980, Ture was arrested for the kidnappings and rapes of a 13-year-old Minneapolis girl and an 18-year-old woman, and the attempted kidnapping and rape of a 20-year-old woman who escaped by burning his face with a cigarette. While in custody, local police began investigating him in the murder of Diane Edwards, whose nude and battered body was discovered near Elk River on October 3. She had been reported missing on September 26 after being seen getting into a man's car. At least five witnesses who witnessed Edwards' abduction described the man's vehicle as an older, rusted station wagon. This description was similar to Ture's vehicle, a 1974 Ford Galaxie. Four teenage girls witnessed her abduction and identified Ture as the man they saw forcing her into his van.

In April 1981, Ture was convicted of all charges in the kidnapping and rape cases and sentenced to 30 years in prison. Afterwards, he was indicted in Edwards' murder. Based on eyewitnesses identifying him at the murder scene, Ture was convicted and sentenced to life imprisonment. After his conviction, he confessed to the 1978 murders of Alice Huling and her three children, but he quickly recanted his confessions. In 1982, Ture was attacked by several of his cellmates while imprisoned in Stillwater, and sustained a broken nose as a result. The beating occurred a few hours after Ture was placed in general population.

== Revelations ==
Ture would have been eligible for parole in 2008; however in 1996 a grand jury was convened and indicted him with the murder of Marlys Wohlenhaus. After reexamining the case, investigators found that Ture was investigated shortly after her death but provided an alibi which investigators used to clear him, but a new investigation showed that the alibi had been fabricated. Following the indictment, Ture agreed to be interviewed on 48 Hours, during which he professed his innocence. Days after the interview aired, dozens of young women contacted the program claiming to recognize Ture as a man who sexually assaulted them in the 1970s. It was found that most of these sexual assault victims had worked as waitresses, and police believe Ture had stalked them for weeks leading up to the assault.

In 1997, Ture was convicted of Wohlenhaus' murder and was given an additional life sentence. During his imprisonment, Ture allegedly bragged to his cellmate about committing the 1979 killing of Joan Bierschbach, 20. In 1999, Ture was indicted in the Huling family murders, and in 2000 was sentenced to life imprisonment. Ture claims he is innocent in all the murder cases and claims that investigators used him to solve cold cases.

== In popular culture ==
The documentary series Cold Case Files features the investigation into Ture's murders on season 2 episode 11 "Murder on the Menu".

The American punk rock band Hüsker Dü released the song "Diane" in 1983, which is based on the murder of Diane Edwards, Ture's last victim.

The Huling family murders and the investigation into it by the Stearns county sheriff's office, including the interview of Ture whom they considered a suspect, is covered in season 1 episode 7 of In the Dark.

== See also ==
- List of serial rapists
- List of serial killers in the United States
