= Could You Be the One? (Hüsker Dü song) =

Single by Hüsker Dü

from the album Warehouse: Songs and Stories
- Released: January 1987
- Recorded: Nicollet Studios, Minneapolis, Minnesota, August–November 1986
- Genre: Power pop
- Length: 2:32
- Label: Warner Bros. Records
- Songwriter: Bob Mould
- Producer: Hüsker Dü

Hüsker Dü singles chronology
"Sorry Somehow" (1986)	"Could You Be the One?" (1987)	"She's a Woman (And Now He Is a Man)" (1987)

"Could You Be the One?" is a song by Hüsker Dü from their Warehouse: Songs and Stories. The song was released as a single and an EP, both in the United Kingdom.

Allmusic wrote that the song is "Hüsker Dü at its melodic best ... the last real gasp from a band that was about to hit the wall."

A video was filmed for the song, and it was the band's only video that had them performing on a sound stage as opposed to featuring live clips of them playing.

"Could You Be the One?" was performed with "She's A Woman (And Now He Is a Man)" during the band's appearance on The Late Show with Joan Rivers. The song was performed on the Today Show while the show was taping from Minneapolis, Minnesota.

The song was written by Bob Mould. A live version of the B-side "Everytime" (written by Greg Norton) appears on the live album The Living End.

== Single track listing ==
Side One

1. "Could You Be the One?" (Mould)

Side Two

1. "Everytime" (Norton)

== EP track listing ==
Side One

1. "Could You Be the One?" (Mould)

Side Two

1. "Everytime" (Norton)
2. "Charity, Chastity, Prudence, and Hope" (Hart)
