= She's a Woman (And Now He Is a Man) =

Single by Hüsker Dü

from the album Warehouse: Songs and Stories
- Released: 1987
- Recorded: Nicolett Studios, Minneapolis, Minnesota, August–November 1986
- Genre: Alternative rock
- Length: 3:19
- Label: Warner Bros. Records
- Songwriter(s): Grant Hart
- Producer(s): Bob Mould and Grant Hart

Hüsker Dü singles chronology
"Could You Be the One?" (1987)	"She's a Woman (And Now He Is a Man)" (1987)	"Ice Cold Ice" (1987)

"She's a Woman (And Now He Is a Man)" is a song by Hüsker Dü from their album Warehouse: Songs and Stories. The song was released to radio as a promotional single in 1987 and was written and sung by Grant Hart.

"She's a Woman (And Now He Is a Man)" was performed by the band on The Late Show with Joan Rivers along with "Could You Be the One?."

== Track listing ==
Side One

1. "She's a Woman (And Now He Is a Man)" – 3:19 (Hart)
2. "Ice Cold Ice – 4:23 (Mould)

Side Two

1. "Charity, Chastity, Prudence and Hope" – 3:11 (Hart)
2. "No Reservations" – 3:40 (Mould)
