= Loose (Therapy? song) =

1995 single by Therapy?

Single by Therapy?

from the album Infernal Love
- Released: 17 July 1995
- Genre: Pop punk
- Length: 3:03
- Label: A&M
- Songwriter: Andy Cairns
- Producer: Al Clay

Therapy? singles chronology
"Stories" (1995)	"Loose" (1995)	"Diane" (1995)

"Loose" is a song by Northern Irish rock band Therapy? and a single released on 17 July 1995 through A&M Records. The song is included on the band's fifth album, Infernal Love (1995). The single reached number 25 on the UK Singles Chart and number 23 on the Irish Singles Chart. The single was released on CD, CD digipak, green 7-inch vinyl, and cassette. A music video was made in two versions, for "Loose" and for "Loose (Photek remix)".

== Track listings ==
No.	Title	Length
1.	"Loose"	3:03
2.	"Our Love Must Die"	2:32
3.	"Nice Guys"	2:49
4.	"Loose" (Photek remix)	6:22

Digipak CD
No.	Title	Length
1.	"Loose"	3:03
2.	"Die Laughing" (live)	2:46
3.	"Nowhere" (live)	2:29
4.	"Unbeliever" (live)	3:43

- Live tracks were recorded in the United Kingdom in June 1995

== Personnel ==
- Andy Cairns: vocals/guitar
- Fyfe Ewing: drums/backing vocals
- Michael McKeegan: bass/backing vocals
- Al Clay: producer
- Dave Porter: engineer, mixer (live tracks)
- Chris Leckie: mixer (live tracks)
- Photek: additional production & remix
- Anton Corbijn: photography
- Jeremy Pearce: design
- Simon Carrington: design

== Charts ==
Chart (1995)	Peak position
Europe (Eurochart Hot 100)	81
Ireland (IRMA)	23
Scotland Singles (OCC)	26
UK Singles (OCC)	25
UK Rock & Metal (OCC)	1
UK Rock & Metal (OCC) Digipak version	4
