= Metal Circus =

EP by Hüsker Dü
- Released: October 1983
- Recorded: December 1982 – January 1983
- Studios: Total Access, Redondo Beach, California
- Genre: Hardcore punk
- Length: 18:57
- Label: SST (020)
- Producers: Hüsker Dü; Spot

Hüsker Dü chronology
Everything Falls Apart (1983)	Metal Circus (1983)	Zen Arcade (1984)

Metal Circus is an EP by American punk rock band Hüsker Dü, released in 1983 by SST Records. As one of their early records, it was largely rooted in the band's initial hardcore punk style. However, signs of a new, poppier influence emerge on Metal Circus, particularly in the songs sung by Grant Hart ("It's Not Funny Anymore" and "Diane"). It also features some of Bob Mould's most passionate singing and shows further development in his guitar playing. Harmonic, chorus-type effects applied to Mould's guitar are more prominent. The change from the furious hardcore moments of Land Speed Record and Everything Falls Apart towards increasing melodicism hints at the groundbreaking new approach that was to be seen on the band's next release, Zen Arcade.

The horrific murder depicted in the anguished "Diane" is based upon the murder of West St. Paul waitress Diane Edwards. The song was covered by Coffin Break in 1989, Irish band Therapy? in 1995, Superdrag also in 1995, and Gravenhurst in 2004 .

While only 21 seconds shorter than their debut studio album, Everything Falls Apart, and generally viewed as an EP, Metal Circus was almost released as a 30-minute album with 12 songs. The outtakes were "Standing by the Sea" (later used on Zen Arcade), "Heavy Handed", "Is Today the Day?", "You Think I'm Scared", and "Won't Change" (which later appeared on the compilation A Diamond Hidden in the Mouth of a Corpse). In 2017, The Numero Group released the Savage Young Dü compilation of early Hüsker Dü material. A bonus edition of the compilation was packaged with a 7" entitled Extra Circus containing the outtakes from the EP's sessions.

== Critical reception ==
Professional ratings
Review scores
Source	Rating
AllMusic	4/5 stars
Robert Christgau	A
Rolling Stone	4/5 stars
Spin	9/10 stars

In a 1984 Trouser Press review, John Leland said the band "flirts with heavy metal, but also reveal strains of folk and psychedelia. The metal ventures (noisy lead guitars) expand Hüsker Dü's sound without getting sludgy or bombastic. On the slower tunes,...the guitars drone like a supercharged Dream Syndicate. On the fast tunes they smoke."

AllMusic's Stephen Thomas Erlewine said that Metal Circus "is the first indication of Hüsker Dü's greatness," adding that "With these five songs, the band shows more invention, skill, and melody than it did over the course of a full album with Everything Falls Apart, and both Bob Mould and Grant Hart emerge as significant songwriters."

== Track listing ==
Side one

1. "Real World" (Mould) – 2:27
2. "Deadly Skies" (Mould) – 1:50
3. "It's Not Funny Anymore" (Hart) – 2:12
4. "First of the Last Calls" (Mould) – 2:48

Side two

1. "Lifeline" (Mould) – 2:19
2. "Diane" (Hart) – 4:42
3. "Out on a Limb" (Mould) – 2:39

== Personnel ==
Liner notes adapted from the album sleeve.

Hüsker Dü

- Bob Mould – vocals, guitar
- Grant Hart – vocals, drums
- Greg Norton – bass guitar

Technical

- Hüsker Dü – producer
- Spot – producer, engineer
- Fake Name Graphx – album cover
