= Sorry Somehow =

EP from Candy Apple Grey by Hüsker Dü
- Released: September 1986
- Recorded: October 1985 – January 1986
- Genre: Pop-punk
- Length: 4:25
- Label: Warner Bros.
- Producer: Bob Mould and Grant Hart

Hüsker Dü chronology
Don't Want to Know If You Are Lonely (1986)	Sorry Somehow (1986)	Could You Be The One? (1987)

Professional ratings
Review scores
Source	Rating
AllMusic	3/5 stars

"Sorry Somehow" the second single from Hüsker Dü's major-label debut Candy Apple Grey. It was also released as a double 7" single and a 5-song EP.

== Single track listing ==
Side A

1. "Sorry Somehow" (Hart)

Side B

1. "All This I've Done For You" (Mould)

== Double 7" listing ==
Side A

1. "Sorry Somehow" (Hart)

Side B

1. "All This I've Done For You" (Mould)

Side C

1. "Flexible Flyer" (Hart)

Side D

1. "Celebrated Summer" (Mould)

== EP track listing ==
Side One

1. "Sorry Somehow" (Hart)
2. "All This I've Done For You" (Mould)

Side Two

1. "Flexible Flyer" (Hart)
2. "Celebrated Summer" (Mould)
3. "Fattie" (Mould/Hart)

"Flexible Flyer" and "Celebrated Summer" were recorded live at the Roxy in Los Angeles, California.
