= Don't Want to Know If You Are Lonely =

EP from Candy Apple Grey by Hüsker Dü
- Released: March 1986
- Recorded: October 1985 – January 1986
- Genres: Punk rock; pop-punk
- Length: 3:29
- Label: Warner Bros.
- Producers: Bob Mould; Grant Hart

Hüsker Dü chronology
Makes No Sense At All (1985)	Don't Want to Know If You Are Lonely (1986)	Sorry Somehow (1986)

"Don't Want to Know If You Are Lonely" is a song by Hüsker Dü from their album Candy Apple Grey. The song was written by Grant Hart. It was released both as a single and EP in the United States and United Kingdom in March 1986. Hüsker Dü filmed a promotional video for the song, which garnered the band some play on MTV. The song, dubbed a "tuneful blast of Buzzcocks-style pop-punk", was labeled the high point of Grey in a respective review by AllMusic's Stewart Mason.

The song is featured in the 2009 comedy-drama movie Adventureland.

== Track listing ==
=== EP track listing ===
Side One

1. "Don't Want to Know If You Are Lonely" (Hart)
2. "Helter Skelter" (Lennon-McCartney)

Side Two

1. "All Work and No Play" (Long Mix) (Mould)

"Helter Skelter" was recorded live on January 30, 1985, at First Avenue in Minneapolis, Minnesota.

=== UK single track listing ===
Side One

1. "Don't Want to Know If You Are Lonely" (Hart)

Side Two

1. "All Work and No Play" (Mould)

== Side by Side: Record Store Day 2011 ==
"Don't Want to Know If You Are Lonely"

Single by Hüsker Dü and Green Day
- A-side: "Don't Want to Know If You Are Lonely" (as performed by Hüsker Dü)
- B-side: "Don't Wanna Know If You Are Lonely" (as performed by Green Day)
- Released: April 16, 2011
- Genre: Punk rock
- Label: Warner Bros.
- Songwriter: Grant Hart

Green Day singles chronology
"When It's Time" (2010)	"Don't Want to Know If You Are Lonely" (2011)	"Oh Love" (2012)

On Record Store Day 2011, Warner Bros. Records released an exclusive limited edition print of a "Don't Want to Know If You Are Lonely" split single. The split single features the original version of "Don't Want to Know If You Are Lonely" performed by Hüsker Dü on one side, and a cover version by the band Green Day on the other. The Green Day version had previously appeared on the single for their song "Warning".

Side A

1. "Don't Want to Know If You Are Lonely" (as performed by Hüsker Dü)

Side B

1. "Don't Wanna Know If You Are Lonely" (as performed by Green Day)

== Cover versions ==
"Don't Want to Know If You Are Lonely" has been covered by several different artists, including Green Day, who recorded it for an MTV show titled Influences. The UK band Catherine Wheel recorded a version of the song on their 1992 30th Century Man EP. Also in 1992, Mega City Four covered it on their LP Inspiringly Titled: The Live Album, and its advance EP, Shivering Sand – Live. The Swedish rock band Fireside has also recorded a version of the song on their Hello Kids album. In 2013, Il Cattivo, a Denver-based heavy rock band, released a guitar-dueling rendition on their second record, How to Assess Your Damages. The song was also covered by Australian musician Paul Dempsey.
