= Man Sized Action =

Post-punk band from Minneapolis, active in the 1980s

- Origin: Minneapolis, Minnesota, United States
- Genres: Alternative rock, post-punk
- Years active: 1981-1984
- Labels: Reflex Records
- Past members: Patrick Woods: Vocals; Tom "Tippy" Roth: Guitar; Kelly Linehan: Bass; Tony Pucci: Drums; Brian Paulson: Guitar

Man Sized Action was a post-punk group from Minneapolis. John Leland of Trouser Press described the band as an "unpretentious lot" in the vein of Hüsker Dü who "opened up punk structures with distorted, ringing guitar, some off-kilter rhythms and ... a neanderthal, propulsive attack to fundamentally poppy songs." Influential musician and producer Steve Albini of Big Black called them "one of the finest bands in Minneapolis or anywhere."

== Career ==
Man Sized Action was formed by vocalist Patrick Woods, guitarist Tom "Tippy" Roth, bassist Kelly Linehan, and drummer Tony Pucci, all part of the same punk-rock scene that spawned Hüsker Dü. Their sound was influenced by Wire and Mission of Burma, setting them apart from other Minnesota hardcore bands by adding stronger melody and pop structures. The band's first gig was in 1981, a seven-song set put together only a few weeks after all four musicians had first learned to play their instruments. Nevertheless, they developed a following which included Albini, who praised their music as "the sort of sound that comes about spontaneously, devoid of mimicry."

The band released two records in 1983 and 1984. The band drew on its Hüsker Dü connections for debut record Claustrophobia, which was produced by Bob Mould and featured an album cover designed by Grant Hart.

Second guitarist Brian Paulson joined for 1984's Five Story Garage.

Five Story Garage's distinctive cover art was the result of an unintentional error in preparation for the four-color printing process.

Both albums, as well as two compilations on which the band appeared, were released by Reflex Records.

The band broke up amicably in 1984 when Pucci left Minneapolis for college, but reunited several times for reunion shows in subsequent years, including an annual Christmas show that gathers many 1980s-era Minneapolis punk bands.

Kelly Linehan later played bass with Dragnet. Paulson became a record producer best known for albums by Slint, Uncle Tupelo, Son Volt and Wilco.

== Critical reception ==
Claustrophobia
Review scores
Source	Rating
AllMusic	3/5 stars

Five Story Garage
Review scores
Source	Rating
AllMusic	3/5 stars

Trouser Press' Leland wrote that Claustrophobia "sets up powerful grooves, but never escapes its murky dynamic." He called Five Story Garage an improvement, saying that it "generates a surge of momentum that threatens to explode its punky pop hooks, making the album fast, powerful and surprisingly accessible."

Writing in the zine Matter, Albini criticized Claustrophobia as "raw and thin", lacking depth, but praised the record's "huge killer songs with balls as big as houses treading the water between Mekons/Fall-styled practiced amateurishness and Joy Division/Wire-styled controlled creepiness."

Jim Fitzsimons of the Tampa Bay Times praised the band's "swirling guitars and driving beat", calling the two albums "good ol' Minneapolis do-it-yourself punk rock."

== Albums ==
- Claustrophobia (Reflex) 1983
- Five Story Garage (Reflex) 1984

== Compilations ==
- Barefoot and Pregnant v/a compilation CD (Reflex) (1998) - "Yea!", "Everybody's Happy", "Pressure Relief", "I Hit Girls"
- Kitten: A Compilation v/a compilation CD (Reflex) (1999) - "Only You", "Self-respect"
