= Warehouse: Songs and Stories =

Studio album by Hüsker Dü
- Released: January 19, 1987
- Recorded: August–November 1986
- Studios: Nicollet, Minneapolis, Minnesota
- Genres: Alternative rock; post-hardcore; power pop
- Length: 68:35
- Label: Warner Bros.
- Producers: Bob Mould, Grant Hart

Hüsker Dü chronology
Candy Apple Grey (1986)	Warehouse: Songs and Stories (1987)	The Living End (1994)

Singles from Warehouse: Songs and Stories
- 1. "Could You Be the One?" Released: January 1987; 2. "Ice Cold Ice" Released: June 1987

Warehouse: Songs and Stories is the sixth and final studio album by American punk rock band Hüsker Dü, released by Warner Bros. Records on January 19, 1987, as a double album on two vinyl LPs.

== Background ==
The band dissolved following the tour in support of its release, in part due to disagreements between songwriters Bob Mould and Grant Hart over the latter's drug use and the loss of their manager David Savoy from suicide in February 1987. This album, along with Candy Apple Grey, showcases the increasing maturity of Mould and Hart's writing—a change which alienated some long-time fans. This album is also known for its battle between the two songwriters, with Mould famously telling Hart that he would never have more than half of the songs on a Hüsker Dü album.

Mould later said that this time period was a "rough stretch", but that Warehouse was still a "good record." "Had it been pared back to a single record it might have had more impact, but we were already loggerheads at that point."

The album's title comes from the fact that the group had rented some warehouse space in which to write and rehearse; a change from their former practice of writing new material and testing it out on live audiences.

During the recording sessions, Hart and Mould replaced a few of Greg Norton's bass tracks for their respective songs when Norton's own contributions were not to their liking. In his autobiography, Mould identified Hart's "Charity, Chastity, Prudence and Hope" as one of the songs whose bass lines were rerecorded, uncredited, by their composers.

== Release ==
"Could You Be the One?" was released as a single and video; the only other single released from the album was "Ice Cold Ice". Warehouse: Songs and Stories peaked at No. 117 on the Billboard Top 200 and also charted for a week on the UK Albums Chart at No. 72. Hüsker Dü was interviewed and performed "Could You Be the One?" and "She's a Woman (And Now He Is a Man)" live on The Late Show With Joan Rivers on April 27, 1987.

A cover version of "Up in the Air" was included on Heidi Berry's album Love.

== Critical reception ==
Professional ratings
Review scores
Source	Rating
AllMusic	5/5 stars
Chicago Sun-Times	4/4 stars
Chicago Tribune	3/4 stars
The Philadelphia Inquirer	4/4 stars
Q	4/5 stars
The Rolling Stone Album Guide	3/5 stars
Select	4/5
Spin Alternative Record Guide	7/10
The Village Voice	A−

The album was included in the book 1001 Albums You Must Hear Before You Die.

== Track listing ==
CD releases of Warehouse: Songs and Stories combine all the songs onto a single disc.

Side one
No.	Title	Writer(s)	Length
1.	"These Important Years"	Bob Mould	3:49
2.	"Charity, Chastity, Prudence and Hope"	Grant Hart	3:11
3.	"Standing in the Rain"	Mould	3:41
4.	"Back from Somewhere"	Hart	2:16
5.	"Ice Cold Ice"	Mould	4:23

Side two
No.	Title	Writer(s)	Length
6.	"You're a Soldier"	Hart	3:03
7.	"Could You Be the One?"	Mould	2:32
8.	"Too Much Spice"	Hart	2:57
9.	"Friend, You've Got to Fall"	Mould	3:20
10.	"Visionary"	Mould	2:30
11.	"She Floated Away"	Hart	3:32

Side three
No.	Title	Writer(s)	Length
12.	"Bed of Nails"	Mould	4:44
13.	"Tell You Why Tomorrow"	Hart	2:42
14.	"It's Not Peculiar"	Mould	4:06
15.	"Actual Condition"	Hart	1:50
16.	"No Reservations"	Mould	3:40

Side four
No.	Title	Writer(s)	Length
17.	"Turn It Around"	Mould	4:32
18.	"She's a Woman (And Now He Is a Man)"	Hart	3:19
19.	"Up in the Air"	Mould	3:03
20.	"You Can Live at Home"	Hart	5:25

== Personnel ==
- Bob Mould – guitar, bass guitar, keyboards, vocals
- Grant Hart – drums, bass guitar, keyboards, percussion, vocals
- Greg Norton – bass guitar, vocals

Production

- Producers: Bob Mould, Grant Hart
- Engineer: Steven Fjelstad
- Mastering: Howie Weinberg
- Photography: Daniel Corrigan, Hüsker Dü
