= Makes No Sense at All =

Single by Hüsker Dü

from the album Flip Your Wig
- Released: August 1985
- Recorded: March–June 1985
- Genre: Power pop; noise pop
- Length: 2:43
- Label: SST (051)
- Songwriter: Bob Mould
- Producers: Bob Mould and Grant Hart

Hüsker Dü singles chronology
"Celebrated Summer" (1984)	"Makes No Sense at All" (1985)	"Don't Want To Know If You Are Lonely" (1986)

"Makes No Sense at All" is a song by Hüsker Dü from the album Flip Your Wig. Written by Bob Mould, the song was released as a single from the album reaching number 2 on the UK indie charts.

The song has since seen positive critical reception and has been performed live by both Hüsker Dü and Mould at his solo shows.

== Background ==
"Makes No Sense at All" was written by Hüsker Dü singer and guitarist Bob Mould. The track demonstrated Hüsker Dü's continued move away from their hardcore punk roots to a more melodic, pop-influenced style. Mould said of the song,

"Makes No Sense at All" sums up all the aspirations I had as a songwriter at that point in my life: "How do I continue mining this somewhat pessimistic outlook on life? How bright is the color of the ribbon that wraps this fabulous wrapping paper around this beautifully dark package? How far can I take this thing?" It's a super simple song, and I play it every night still. It's one of those handful of songs in my catalog that has so far stood the test of time, and I never get tired of playing it. People in the crowd never get tired of singing it back to me. What a cool song. It's fucking weird to say that about my own stuff, but there are a few where I say, "Wow, I like that one!"

Mould described the song as the song that the band would play if the band "knew there would only be seven minutes left before the missiles fell."

== Release ==
"Makes No Sense at All" was the only single from Flip Your Wig. The single's B-side was a cover of "Love Is All Around", the theme song to The Mary Tyler Moore Show. Music videos for both "Makes No Sense at All" and "Love Is All Around" were produced. These featured clips of the band and shots of Minneapolis. For the "Love is All Around" sequence the video has the band copying iconic scenes from the Minneapolis-based Mary Tyler Moore Show opening credit sequence, such as leaving Dayton's and riding the escalator and eating at the IDS Center. Mould continues to perform the song during his solo tours.

== Reception ==
In a review on AllMusic, the song is called "perhaps the group's greatest fusion of punk and pop...Mould had, quite simply, written one of his best melodies, capable of containing the furious energy of his guitar style while still offering a potent melodic hook that made the most of the band's psychedelic undertow." Rob Tannenbaum of Rolling Stone said the song "could almost be termed catchy."

John Leland at Spin said it was, "just more of the Husker dudes' typical brilliant superwhammo-overdrive guitar/bass/drum clang within a phenomenal pop song: Sure it's great, but if you've been listening you already know these guys are godhead and don't need a scrawny 7-inch single to prove their genius."

== Charts ==
Chart (1985)	Peak position
UK Indie Chart	2
