= Diane (Hüsker Dü song) =

1983 song by Hüsker Dü

Song by Hüsker Dü

from the album Metal Circus
- Released: October 1983
- Studio: Total Access Recording (Redondo Beach, California)
- Genre: Punk rock
- Length: 4:42
- Label: SST
- Songwriter: Grant Hart
- Producers: Hüsker Dü; Spot

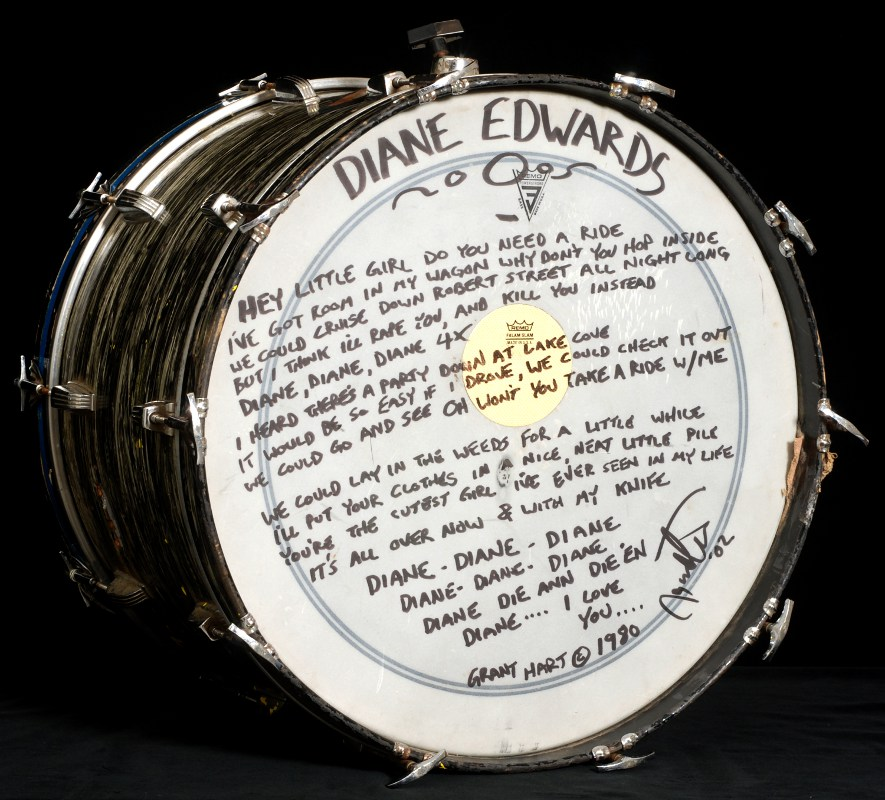
Bass drum used by Hüsker Dü drummer Grant Hart with "Diane" lyrics.

"Diane" is a song by American band Hüsker Dü that appears on their Metal Circus EP from 1983, but appeared in their live set as early as 1981, as evidenced by its inclusion in a recording from August that year which appears on the compilation Savage Young Dü. The song was written by drummer Grant Hart, and concerns the murder of West St. Paul waitress Diane Edwards by Joseph Ture Jr. in 1980.

== Therapy? version ==
"Diane"

Single by Therapy?

from the album Infernal Love
- Released: November 6, 1995
- Genre: Symphonic rock; post-punk
- Length: 4:04
- Label: A&M
- Songwriter: Grant Hart
- Producer: Al Clay

Therapy? singles chronology
"Loose" (1995)	"Diane" (1995)	"Church of Noise" (1998)

Northern Irish metal band Therapy? covered the song and released it as a single on November 6, 1995, on A&M Records. The song is featured on the Infernal Love album in a radically different arrangement from the original, featuring only cello and vocals. The single reached number 26 on the UK Singles Chart and number 20 on the Irish Singles Chart. The single entered the top 10 in several European countries, winning an award for best single from Humo magazine in Belgium. The single was released on CD, CD digipak, CD velvet digipak, red 7-inch vinyl, and cassette.

=== Track listings ===
7-inch and CD

No.	Title	Length
1.	"Diane"	4:04
2.	"Misery" (acoustic version)	3:08
3.	"Die Laughing" (acoustic version)	3:02
4.	"Screamager" (acoustic version)	2:51

Tracks three and four were recorded for "Collin's and Maconie's Hit Parade", BBC Radio One.

Velvet digipak CD and cassette

No.	Title	Length
1.	"Diane"	4:04
2.	"Jude the Obscene" (acoustic version)	3:27
3.	"Loose" (acoustic version)	3:09
4.	"30 Seconds" (acoustic version)	2:42

Tracks two, three, and four were recorded by Chris Leckie in Zürich, Switzerland, September 1995.

German double CD digipak

Disc 1
No.	Title	Length
1.	"Diane"	4:04
2.	"Misery" (acoustic version)	3:08
3.	"Die Laughing" (acoustic version)	3:02
4.	"Screamager" (acoustic version)	2:51

Disc 2
No.	Title	Length
1.	"Jude the Obscene" (acoustic version)	3:27
2.	"Loose" (acoustic version)	3:09
3.	"30 Seconds" (acoustic version)	2:42

=== Personnel ===
Therapy?

- Andy Cairns – vocals
- Fyfe Ewing – backing vocals
- Michael McKeegan – backing vocals

Additional

- Martin McCarrick – cello, backing vocals
- Al Clay – producer (Diane & Misery)
- Anton Corbijn – photography
- Lewis Mulatero – photography
- Phil Knott – photography
- Jeremy Pearce – design
- Simon Carrington – design

=== Charts ===
==== Weekly charts ====
Chart (1995–1996)	Peak position
Belgium (Ultratop 50 Flanders)	5
Belgium (Ultratop 50 Wallonia)	27
Europe (Eurochart Hot 100)	52
Finland (Suomen virallinen lista)	14
France (SNEP)	30
Ireland (IRMA)	20
Netherlands (Dutch Top 40)	11
Netherlands (Single Top 100)	10
Scotland Singles (OCC)	26
Sweden (Sverigetopplistan)	8
UK Singles (OCC)	26
UK Rock & Metal (OCC)	1

==== Year-end charts ====
Chart (1996)	Position
Belgium (Ultratop 50 Flanders)	61
Sweden (Topplistan)	78
