= Candy Apple Grey =

Studio album by Hüsker Dü
- Released: March 17, 1986
- Recorded: October 1985 – January 1986
- Studio: Nicollet, Minneapolis, Minnesota
- Genre: Post-hardcore; alternative rock
- Length: 37:04
- Label: Warner Bros.
- Producer: Bob Mould, Grant Hart

Hüsker Dü chronology
Flip Your Wig (1985)	Candy Apple Grey (1986)	Warehouse: Songs and Stories (1987)

Singles from Candy Apple Grey
- 1. "Don't Want to Know If You Are Lonely" Released: March 1986; 2. "Sorry Somehow" Released: November 1986

Professional ratings
Review scores
Source	Rating
AllMusic	3.5/5 stars
Chicago Tribune	3/4 stars
Q	4/5 stars
The Rolling Stone Album Guide	4/5 stars
Select	4/5
Spin Alternative Record Guide	8/10
The Village Voice	A

Candy Apple Grey is the fifth studio album by the American alternative rock band Hüsker Dü, released in 1986 through Warner Bros. Records.

It was the band's first major label release, though Warner Bros. had lobbied to release Flip Your Wig until the band decided to let SST Records have it. Candy Apple Grey also marks the completion of the band's transition from hardcore punk to a more well-rounded sonic style which would later come to be known as alternative rock. As usual, Bob Mould and Grant Hart individually wrote tracks on the album. While the band's earlier, more frenetic style is still evident, Candy Apple Grey also features more introverted, toned-down material, including a relatively large amount of acoustic guitar.

The singles released from this album were "Don't Want to Know If You Are Lonely" and "Sorry Somehow", both written and sung by Hart. The latter was accompanied by a promotional video which earned airtime on MTV. Candy Apple Grey was the first Hüsker Dü album to chart on the Billboard Top 200, but despite receiving exposure on radio as well as MTV, it peaked at No. 140.

== Re-release ==
Candy Apple Grey was re-released on Record Store Day (April 19, 2014) on heavyweight grey vinyl.

== Track listing ==
No.	Title	Writer(s)	Length
1.	"Crystal"	Bob Mould	3:28
2.	"Don't Want to Know If You Are Lonely"	Grant Hart	3:29
3.	"I Don't Know for Sure"	Mould	2:27
4.	"Sorry Somehow"	Hart	4:25
5.	"Too Far Down"	Mould	4:37
6.	"Hardly Getting Over It"	Mould	6:02
7.	"Dead Set on Destruction"	Hart	2:59
8.	"Eiffel Tower High"	Mould	2:49
9.	"No Promise Have I Made"	Hart	3:39
10.	"All This I've Done for You"	Mould	3:09

== Personnel ==
Hüsker Dü

- Bob Mould – guitar, vocals, keyboards, percussion, producer
- Grant Hart – drums, vocals, percussion, keyboards, producer
- Greg Norton – bass guitar

Technical

- Steven Fjelstad – engineer
- Howie Weinberg – mastering
- Daniel Corrigan – cover photography

== Covers ==
- "Dead Set on Destruction" was covered by Minneapolis band Trip Shakespeare on its 1992 EP Volt.
- "Don't Want to Know If You Are Lonely" was covered by Catherine Wheel, Mega City Four, Political Asylum, Green Day, and Prong, among others.
