= Celebrated Summer =

Promotional single by Hüsker Dü

from the album New Day Rising
- Released: December 1984
- Recorded: July 1984 at Nicollet Studios, Minneapolis, Minnesota
- Genre: Hardcore punk
- Length: 4:00 (A side); 2:31 (B side)
- Label: SST
- Songwriter: Bob Mould
- Producers: Hüsker Dü and Spot

Hüsker Dü singles chronology
"Eight Miles High" (1984)	"Celebrated Summer" (1984)	"Makes No Sense at All" (1985)

Audio sample
- Sample of "Celebrated Summer" from New Day Rising: file; help

"Celebrated Summer" is a song by Hüsker Dü from their album New Day Rising. It was written by guitarist Bob Mould. The song was released as a promotional single given to radio stations in December 1984, along with the album's title track, "New Day Rising". It was never released as a regular single.

The song is known for its opening guitar riff, as well as its twelve-string acoustic guitar breaks towards the middle and at the end of the song. This was something that was very different for a band labeled as hardcore punk, although the song "Never Talking To You Again" from their previous album, Zen Arcade, had also been recorded with an acoustic guitar.

The lyrics of the song recall summers past with lines like "Getting drunk out on the beach or playing in a band / Getting out of school meant getting out of hand" as well as its chorus of "Is this your celebrated summer? / Was that your celebrated summer?".

In subsequent live performances of the song after Hüsker Dü's breakup, Mould changed the wording of the chorus from "celebrated summer" to "celebrated summertime".

== Critical reception ==
In a retrospective review, the song was called "a prime example of Hüsker Dü's unique ability to effectively combine wistful, even tender moments with the hardest elements of rock & roll" in a review on AllMusic. The reviewer added that "Celebrated Summer" is "a step toward the mainstream — unflinchingly melodic and well-produced — but it never compromises the passionate spirit of the band nor the ferocious energy that fuels them."

== Tributes ==
In 1996, the song was covered by the thrash metal band Anthrax.

The song was covered by singer songwriter Mark Kozelek as part of The Finally LP released in 2008.

In 2005, a punk/hardcore record store opened in Baltimore, Maryland naming itself after the song.

== Track listing ==
A side

1. Celebrated Summer (Mould)

B side

1. New Day Rising (Mould, Hüsker Dü)
