= Everything Falls Apart =

Studio album by Hüsker Dü
- Released: January 1983
- Recorded: June–July 1982
- Studio: Total Access, Redondo Beach, California
- Genre: Hardcore punk
- Length: 19:22 (original); 42:07 (reissue)
- Label: Reflex
- Producer: Hüsker Dü; Spot

Hüsker Dü chronology
Land Speed Record (1982)	Everything Falls Apart (1983)	Metal Circus (1983)

Reissue cover

Everything Falls Apart is the debut studio album by the American hardcore band Hüsker Dü. It was released in January 1983 through Reflex Records.

== Critical reception ==
Professional ratings
Review scores
Source	Rating
AllMusic	3/5 stars
Chicago Tribune	3/4 stars
Christgau's Record Guide	A−
The Rolling Stone Album Guide	3/5 stars
Sounds	3.5/5 stars
Spin Alternative Record Guide	6/10

In a 1983 Trouser Press review, Jon Young said, "Yeah! Hyperspeed aggression!...Buzzsaw guitars! Shouting! A disrespectful version of "Sunshine Superman"!...Not Bad!"

Chuck Eddy contends that the album "has no melody to speak of, just one microscopic blot after another, with so little time-out space that it's not so much as if there's eighteen real short (mainly under a minute) combustions as two real long ones, one per side. Here and there inside the unrelenting compost you detect word hooks (e.g., the days of the week) or bass hooks, but that's it." Eric Weisbard, writing in Spin Alternative Record Guide (1995), notes that Everything Falls Apart is "clarified by printed lyrics, studio production, and the first hints of melody, but remains mostly constant jolts of guitar electrocution."

== Reissue ==
The album was released on compact disc in 1993 as Everything Falls Apart and More, with bonus tracks including the band's first two singles, the full version of "Statues" lasting over eight minutes, and an unreleased track recorded in a St. Paul, Minnesota, basement called "Do You Remember?" (the English translation of "husker du" from both Danish and Norwegian). The reissue also includes extensive liner notes by Terry Katzman, co-founder of Reflex Records and soundman for the band from 1980 to 1983, as well as lyrics to a few of the songs. On June 18, 2017, a remastered version of the original album was released digitally by the Chicago reissues label The Numero Group and also included in the Savage Young Dü box set.

== Track listing ==
No.	Title	Writer(s)	Length
1.	"From the Gut"	Bob Mould, Greg Norton	1:40
2.	"Blah Blah Blah"	Mould, Norton	2:10
3.	"Punch Drunk"	Mould	0:32
4.	"Bricklayer"	Mould	0:34
5.	"Afraid of Being Wrong"	Mould	1:23
6.	"Sunshine Superman"	Donovan	1:51
7.	"Signals from Above"	Mould	1:38
8.	"Everything Falls Apart"	Mould	2:12
9.	"Wheels"	Grant Hart	2:08
10.	"Target"	Mould	1:43
11.	"Obnoxious"	Mould	0:53
12.	"Gravity"	Mould	2:38
Total length:			19:22

Everything Falls Apart and More CD bonus tracks
No.	Title	Writer(s)	Length
13.	"In a Free Land"	Mould	2:53
14.	"What Do I Want?"	Hart	1:15
15.	"M.I.C."	Mould	1:10
16.	"Statues (Unedited Version)"	Hart	8:45
17.	"Let's Go Die"	Norton	1:54
18.	"Amusement"	Mould	4:57
19.	"Do You Remember?"	Mould	1:55
Total length:			42:07

Notes

Adapted from the liner notes of Everything Falls Apart and More.

- "In a Free Land", "What Do I Want?" and "M.I.C." – single, May 1982; recorded at Blackberry Way, Minneapolis, February 1982; remixed at Creation Studio, Minneapolis, June 1992
- "Statues" – previously unreleased extended version; edit issued as a single, January 1981; recorded at Blackberry Way, Minneapolis, August 1980; remixed at Absolute Music, Minneapolis, August 1992
- "Let's Go Die" – previously unreleased outtake from the "Statues" session; recorded at Blackberry Way, Minneapolis, August 1980
- "Amusement" – B-side of "Statues", January 1981; recorded live at Duffy's, Minneapolis, October 1980
- "Do You Remember?" – previously unreleased demo; recorded live in a St. Paul basement, 1980

== Personnel ==
Adapted from the liner notes of Everything Falls Apart and More.

Hüsker Dü

- Bob Mould – guitar, vocals
- Greg Norton – bass, vocals
- Grant Hart – drums, vocals

Hümper Dü Boys Choir

- Robin Henley – backing vocals
- Steve "Mugger" Corbin – backing vocals
- Merrill Ward – backing vocals

Technical

- Spot − producer, engineer
- Hüsker Dü − producer
- Fake Name Graphx − sleeve

Everything Falls Apart and More

- Hüsker Dü – producer (13–19), compilation producer
- Colin Mansfield – producer (16, 17), engineer (18)
- Steve Fjelstad – engineer (13–18)
- Terry Katzman – recorded by (18), liner notes
- Bill Bruce – recorded by (19)
- Brian Paulson – remix, remix engineer (13–15)
- Grant Hart – remix (16)
- Matt Zimmerman – remix engineer (16)
- Bill Inglot – remastering
- Dan Hersch – remastering
- Doug Myren − compilation producer
- Rachel Gutek – design
