= Flip Your Wig =

Studio album by Hüsker Dü
- Released: September 1985
- Recorded: March–June 1985
- Studios: Nicollet, Minneapolis, Minnesota
- Genres: Power pop; punk rock
- Length: 40:09
- Label: SST (055)
- Producers: Bob Mould, Grant Hart

Hüsker Dü chronology
| New Day Rising (1985) | Flip Your Wig (1985) | Candy Apple Grey (1986) |

Singles from Flip Your Wig
- 1. "Makes No Sense at All" Released: August 1985

Flip Your Wig is the fourth studio album by American punk rock band Hüsker Dü, released in September 1985 through SST Records. It was the band's best-selling album to that point for their label SST Records, and was the last they made for that label.

== Production ==
As the band's first self-produced album, they spent months in the studio to achieve higher-quality production for its melodic power pop songs.

By 1985 Hüsker Dü was the best-selling band on SST Records. The band had wanted to produce their previous album New Day Rising, but SST insisted on sending long-time label producer Spot. With Flip Your Wig the band was finally allowed to self-produce. Recording took place over several sessions in the band's hometown of Minneapolis from March to June 1985, by far the longest the band had spent in the studio. The cleaner production complemented the more melodic songs, still performed with heavily distorted guitars in a high-powered manner.

Mould said, "There's more emphasis on the vocals. They're a little more out-front. The production is the main thing. Clearer vocals and less emphasis on guitar. The crazy solos... I think we're a little out of that now."

== Songs ==
Guitarist Bob Mould and drummer Grant Hart each wrote roughly half the songs, which continued the band's trend toward power pop and away from the fast, noisy hardcore punk of their earliest material.

"Makes No Sense at All" was released as a single, with "Love Is All Around" (the theme song of the Mary Tyler Moore Show) on the B-side. The A-side was the band's first song to achieve significant airplay on album-oriented rock radio. and its video was the band's first.

"The Baby Song" was a tribute to Grant Hart's newborn child. In 2010, The A.V. Club named it one of "24 songs that almost derail great albums".

== Release and reception ==
Professional ratings
Review scores
| Source | Rating |
|---|---|
| AllMusic | 5/5 stars |
| Chicago Tribune | 4/4 stars |
| The Rolling Stone Album Guide | 4.5/5 stars |
| Spin Alternative Record Guide | 9/10 |
| The Village Voice | A− |

Flip Your Wig appeared via SST in September 1985. It débuted at No. 5 on the CMJ album charts and received more radio airplay and mainstream press attention than the band's earlier releases, including stories in Creem, Spin, Rolling Stone. Robert Christgau declared in The Village Voice that with the album's production the band had "never sounded so good", and the album placed in the top ten of the magazine's critics' poll for 1985 along with New Day Rising. Flip Your Wig became SST's best-selling album at the time of its release, moving 50,000 copies in its first four months.

By the time the album was released Hüsker Dü had signed a record deal with the major-label Warner Music Group, who were keen to release the album themselves. However, out of loyalty, and because of SST's appointment of new promotions manager Ray Farrell, the album was given to SST.

Decades later, Bob Mould saw Flip Your Wig as "the best album Hüsker Dü ever did". Ira Robbins and John Leland at Trouser Press describe the album as "Positively brilliant — fourteen unforgettable pop tunes played like armageddon were nigh" and rate "Makes No Sense at All" as "one of 1985's best 45s". AllMusic's review says "Flip Your Wig would be a remarkable record on its own terms, but the fact that it followed New Day Rising by a matter of months and Zen Arcade by just over a year is simply astonishing."

== Track listing ==
| No. | Title | Writer(s) | Length |
|---|---|---|---|
| 1. | "Flip Your Wig" | Bob Mould | 2:33 |
| 2. | "Every Everything" | Grant Hart | 1:56 |
| 3. | "Makes No Sense at All" | Mould | 2:43 |
| 4. | "Hate Paper Doll" | Mould | 1:52 |
| 5. | "Green Eyes" | Hart | 2:58 |
| 6. | "Divide and Conquer" | Mould | 3:42 |
| 7. | "Games" | Mould | 4:06 |
| 8. | "Find Me" | Mould | 4:05 |
| 9. | "The Baby Song" | Hart | 0:46 |
| 10. | "Flexible Flyer" | Hart | 3:01 |
| 11. | "Private Plane" | Mould | 3:17 |
| 12. | "Keep Hanging On" | Hart | 3:15 |
| 13. | "The Wit and the Wisdom" | Mould | 3:41 |
| 14. | "Don't Know Yet" | Mould | 2:14 |

== Personnel ==
Liner notes adapted from the album sleeve.

Hüsker Dü

- Bob Mould – guitar, bass, piano, lead and background vocals, percussion, producer
- Greg Norton – bass
- Grant Hart – drums, lead and background vocals, vibraphone, slide whistle, percussion, producer

Technical

- Steve Fjelstad – engineer
- Fake Name Communications – cover design
- Bruce A. Christianson – front cover photography
- Daniel Corrigan – back cover and insert photography

== Charts ==
Weekly chart performance for Flip Your Wig
| Chart (1985) | Peak position |
|---|---|
| UK Indie Chart | 1 |
