= Terry Katzman =

American producer, sound engineer, archivist, and record-store owner

- Born: Terry James Katzman; March 8, 1955
- Died: November 8, 2019 (aged 64)
- Occupations: Producer, sound engineer, archivist, and record-store owner
- Years active: 1970s-2010s
- Known for: Reflex Records, work with Hüsker Dü, The Replacements, The Suburbs

Terry James Katzman (March 8, 1955 – November 8, 2019) was a producer, sound engineer, archivist, and record-store owner in Minneapolis, Minnesota, known for his work with the Twin Cities music scene, particularly during the formative early years of Hüsker Dü, The Replacements, and The Suburbs.

== Early life ==
Katzman grew up in Excelsior, Minnesota and attended Minnetonka High School, then St. Cloud State University and the University of Minnesota.

== Career ==
Katzman was a mainstay of the early punk rock scene in Minneapolis beginning in the late 1970s. Hüsker Dü guitarist Bob Mould recalls Katzman working backstage when Mould attended his first concert in Minneapolis, a Suicide Commandos performance at Jay's Longhorn Bar in 1978. He was a sound engineer at legendary club First Avenue, where he became the Replacements' preferred sound mixer for their shows.

With Mould and the other members of Hüsker Dü, Katzman co-founded Reflex Records, which released Hüsker Dü's early single "Statues" and first studio album Everything Falls Apart. Under Katzman's guidance, the label would also release several compilations of regional underground and alternative bands, as well as albums by local post-punk bands Rifle Sport, Man Sized Action, Otto's Chemical Lounge, and Articles of Faith, as well as the Minutemen's 1985 EP Tour-Spiel. Both Katzman and the Hüsker Dü members became too busy with other projects, and the label quietly folded in 1985.

Katzman frequently recorded live shows by Minneapolis bands, from the early 1980s to his death in 2019. One recording of a Replacements performance at a house party in January 1982, which was shut down by the Minneapolis police amid angry shouting from the partygoers, was used as the intro audio on the band's Stink EP. Katzman's archive of more than 100 live Hüsker Dü shows was used as the main source of the 2017 rarities collection Savage Young Dü.

Katzman played a vital part in the independent record stores that supported the Twin Cities underground music scene, working at Oar Folkjokeopus Records starting at the dawn of the punk era in 1976, and in 1985 founding his own store, Garage D'Or Records, which he later expanded into a record label. Garage D'Or released several CDs archiving live shows by seminal punk and New Wave-era Minneapolis bands, including the Suburbs' High Fidelity Boys - Live 1979 and the Suicide Commandos' The Legendary KQRS Concert 1976.

Katzman also co-produced Lick, the 1989 album by Boston alternative rock band The Lemonheads.

Katzman managed the 1990s Minneapolis band The Loose Rails, producing their 1992 album Red Turns To Green with Bill Batson and David Russ.

=== Reflex Records discography ===
Compilations

- Barefoot and Pregnant cassette compilation (1982)
- Kitten cassette compilation (1982)

Hüsker Dü

- "Statues" b/w "Amusement" 7" single (1981)
- Everything Falls Apart 12" LP (1983)
- Live Featuring J.C. (2008)

Rifle Sport

- Voice of Reason 12" LP (1983)

Man Sized Action

- Claustrophobia 12" LP (1983)

Final Conflict

- Final Conflict 7" four-song EP (1983)

Ground Zero

- Ground Zero 12" LP (1983)
- Pink 12" LP (1985)

Articles of Faith

- Give Thanks 12" LP (1983)

Man Sized Action

- Five-Story Garage 12" LP (1984)

Minutemen

- Tour-Spiel 7" four-song EP (1985)

=== Garage D'Or Records discography ===
Compilations

- Barefoot and Pregnant (1998), CD reissue of Reflex compilation
- Kitten (1998), CD reissue of Reflex compilation

Baby Grant Johnson

- A Lonesome Road (1997)
- All Over Your Town (2000)

The Suicide Commandos

- Suicide Commandos Commit Suicide Dance Concert 1978 (2000)
- The Legendary KQRS Concert 1976 (2007)

Howlin' Andy Hound

- The Electric Dreams Of… (2001)

The Bloodshot

- Wake Up And Die Right (2002)
- Straight Up (2004)

The Summer People

- The Summer People (2002)
- Verge of a Breakdown (2004)
- Stranger Things Have Happened (2005)

Mezzo Fist

- Can't Find My Habit (2005)

The New Vintage

- The New Vintage (2006)

The Suburbs

- High Fidelity Boys Live 1979 (2006)

Terry Eason

- Sentimental Vanity (2007)

L7-3

- Men of Distinction (2009)

Man Sized Action

- Five Story Garage (2014), CD reissue of Reflex LP

Otto's Chemical Lounge

- Trip Through Time (2018)

== Death ==
Katzman died on November 8, 2019, at age 64. He was survived by his wife, Penny, and two children.
