= New Day Rising =

Studio album by Hüsker Dü
- Released: January 14, 1985
- Recorded: July 1984
- Studio: Nicollet, Minneapolis
- Genre: Post-hardcore; alternative rock; punk rock
- Length: 40:49
- Label: SST (031)
- Producer: Hüsker Dü, Spot

Hüsker Dü chronology
Zen Arcade (1984)	New Day Rising (1985)	Flip Your Wig (1985)

Singles from New Day Rising
- 1. "Celebrated Summer" Released: December 1984

New Day Rising is the third studio album by the American punk rock band Hüsker Dü, released in 1985 through SST Records.

== Music ==
As with its predecessor, New Day Rising continued to deviate from the fast-paced hardcore punk style of the band's earliest releases, showing an evolution towards slower tempos and more melody. Despite this, it is considered by critics to be musically "more vicious and relentless" than Zen Arcade. According to music journalist Andrew Earles, it expanded the more pop-oriented tracks from Zen Arcade into an entire body of work. Specifically, he cited the tracks "Chartered Trips", "Something I Learned Today", and "First of the Last Calls" from the previous album as having informed this album's sound. Critics have also noted the influence from 1960s pop music present on the album.

New Day Rising’s sound has been described as "scratchy and raw." Some of the album's material is classified as pop punk. According to their late producer Spot, "[the band was] kind of working from within a classic pop structure [...] and doing something else with it. Kind of like they broke into it with a coat hanger and got the keys out and went on a joy ride. And then wore the tires out." According to Ryan Bray of Consequence, "Zen Arcade before it made some great strides toward helping melody coexist on the same turf as hardcore, [and] then New Day Rising marked the point where the band found the balance between coarse aggression and pop rock sweetness."

== Production and release ==
After Hüsker Dü released the album Zen Arcade through SST Records in July 1984, SST co-owner Joe Carducci immediately requested another album. The band wanted to self-produce, but SST insisted on Spot, who produced many of the label's albums, including all of Hüsker Dü's. The recording atmosphere was thus tense. Mould tracked guitars using Ibanez Flying V guitars and drank copious amounts of alcohol during the album's recording process. He said, "I was coming to the end of my drinking time and was realizing I wasn’t the easiest person to be around at times. [...] I could be a fully functioning yet contrary alcoholic at 23 or 24. So songs like “I Apologize” are clearly me feeling like a bad young man, like I should apologise globally for something I probably did but was not fully aware of because I was drunk a lot."

When New Day Rising appeared in January 1985, its slower, more melodic material, coupled with more polished musicianship and production led some fans to perceive the band as more commercial. The band defended themselves against accusations of selling out. The album cover features a photograph by band member Grant Hart, showing dogs in the water at Hidden Beach in Minneapolis, now known as Cedar Lake East Beach.

== Release ==
New Day Rising was released in January 1985 by SST Records. The album charted on the UK Independent Album Charts, peaking at 10th place.

== Reception and legacy ==
Professional ratings
Review scores
Source	Rating
AllMusic	5/5 stars
Chicago Tribune	4/4 stars
The Great Rock Discography	9/10
MusicHound Rock	4.5/5 stars
The Rolling Stone Album Guide	5/5 stars
Sounds	5/5 stars
Spin	4.5/5 stars
Spin Alternative Record Guide	10/10
The Village Voice	A

From contemporary reviews, Spin compared the album favorably to the group's previous album Zen Arcade and praised the songwriting, noting that "these new songs could go up against anything on the radio and blow it away" and that the group has "developed into brilliant pop songwriters." The review concluded that despite producer Spot's "characteristically cheap production", the album "doesn't just fulfill the enormous promise of the Minneapolis trio. It fulfills the even greater promise of punk rock", and that the album "affirms everything that was good about punk in the first place". Robert Christgau gave the album an A rating, opining that it was "clearly their finest record" and that audiences should "Play loud—this is one band that deserves it."

The album was included in end of the year best-of lists, such as the NME, who placed the album at ninth place on their list of top albums of 1985. The New York Times critic Jon Pareles placed New Day Rising at third on his best albums of 1985 list.

From retrospective reviews, Stephen Thomas Erlewine of AllMusic wrote that "[o]ccasionally, the razor-thin production and waves of noise mean that it takes a little bit of effort to pick out the melodies, but more often the furious noise and melodies fuse together to create an overwhelming sonic force", and that Hart and Mould "both turn in songs that are catchy, clever, and alternately wracked with pain or teeming with humor. New Day Rising is a positively cathartic record and ranks as Hüsker Dü's most sustained moment of pure power."

New Day Rising was ranked thirteenth in Spin's "100 Greatest Albums, 1985–2005". In 2014, it was ranked fifty-first in Spin's "The 300 Best Albums of the Past 30 Years (1985–2014)". In 2003, Rolling Stone magazine ranked the album #495 on its list of the 500 greatest albums of all time, and in 2012 pushed it up to rank 488, saying, "The Hüskers created a roar like garbage trucks trying to sing Beach Boys songs", with the album again being ranked number 428 in the 2020 edition. The magazine also included the title track in its "100 Greatest Guitar Songs" list, ranking it at 96. PopMatters included the album on their list of "12 Essential Alternative Rock Albums from the 1980s", saying "New Day Rising was Hüsker Dü's first full-blown alterna-rock record. It's an album that captures a thoroughly road-tested band in its prime, one invigorated by its discovery of how to balance melody, noise, passion, and power without diminishing any of those aspects".

In 2016, Garrett Martin of Paste wrote: "Hüsker Dü are like the Beatles: they have three or four best albums. It doesn’t have the reputation of Zen Arcade, and Bob Mould shits all over the production in his autobiography, but New Day Rising is Hüsker Dü’s best collection of songs, and the most consistent example of the band’s trademark combination of hardcore virility and classic pop hooks." In 2020, AJ Ramirez of PopMatters wrote: "Had this LP been released a decade later and been shepherded by a more flattering producer, it wouldn’t be hard to imagine 'Celebrated Summer', 'Books About UFOs', or 'I Don’t Know What You’re Talking About' being embraced by alternative radio playlists."

== Track listing ==
All tracks are written by Bob Mould, except where noted

No.	Title	Writer(s)	Length
1.	"New Day Rising"	Mould, Hüsker Dü	2:31
2.	"The Girl Who Lives on Heaven Hill"	Grant Hart	3:03
3.	"I Apologize"		3:40
4.	"Folk Lore"		1:34
5.	"If I Told You"	Hart, Mould	2:05
6.	"Celebrated Summer"		4:00
7.	"Perfect Example"		3:16
8.	"Terms of Psychic Warfare"	Hart	2:17
9.	"59 Times the Pain"		3:18
10.	"Powerline"		2:22
11.	"Books About UFOs"	Hart	2:40
12.	"I Don't Know What You're Talking About"		2:20
13.	"How to Skin a Cat"	Mould, Hüsker Dü	1:52
14.	"Whatcha Drinkin'"		1:30
15.	"Plans I Make"	Mould, Hüsker Dü	4:16

== Personnel ==
Credits adapted from the liner notes, except where noted.

Hüsker Dü

- Bob Mould – vocals, guitar
- Greg Norton – bass
- Grant Hart – vocals, drums, piano on "Books About UFOs"

Technical

- Spot – producer, engineer
- Hüsker Dü – producer
- Steve Fjelstad – engineer
- Fake Name Graphx – cover art, photography

== Charts ==
Chart (1985)	Peak position
UK Indie Chart	10
