= Land Speed Record (album) =

Live album by Hüsker Dü
- Released: January 1982
- Recorded: August 15, 1981
- Venue: 7th Street Entry, Minneapolis, Minnesota
- Genre: Hardcore punk
- Length: 26:35
- Label: New Alliance; SST (reissue)
- Producer: Hüsker Dü

Hüsker Dü chronology
Land Speed Record (1982)	Everything Falls Apart (1983)

Professional ratings
Review scores
Source	Rating
AllMusic	2/5 stars
Robert Christgau	B+
The Rolling Stone Album Guide	2/5 stars

Land Speed Record is a live album (and first full-length release) by American punk rock band Hüsker Dü, released in January 1982 by New Alliance Records. It was recorded live on August 15, 1981, at the 7th Street Entry, a venue in Minneapolis, Minnesota. The album is a straight-forward hardcore record compared to the melodic post-hardcore that the band pioneered and performed towards the end of their career.

== Background and recording ==
Hüsker Dü's August 1981 concert was recorded straight to 4-track soundboard tape on a three hundred dollar budget. Mould said, "We played really really fast and kept it together; and we did it live with no overdubs." Once the band had taped it they realized they lacked the financial means to release the album. Friend of the band and member of Minutemen, Mike Watt, offered to put out the album on his label, New Alliance. The original LP release on New Alliance contained an insert with lyrics and upcoming tour dates. The album got a European release on Alternative Tentacles in the UK.

The album was reissued in 1987 on SST Records on compact disc and LP. Like Hüsker Dü's other releases, Land Speed Record has not been remastered to alter the LP's sound for the compact disc release. The band's ongoing royalty disputes with SST have been given as the cause for not having a unique CD edition issued. Ken Shipley of The Numero Group has noted that the original tape was stolen from the band's van. The SST CD contains only two tracks, one for each side of the original LP.

The Numero Group's 2017 box set Savage Young Dü includes an alternate version of the same set, recorded at a Twin/Tone Records showcase two weeks later.

== Track listing ==
Side one – 12:27

1. "All Tensed Up" (Bob Mould) – 2:02
2. "Don't Try to Call" (Mould) – 1:30
3. "I'm Not Interested" (Grant Hart) – 1:31
4. "Guns at My School" (Mould) – 0:55
5. "Push the Button" (Hart) – 1:48
6. "Gilligan's Island" (Hart) – 1:23
7. "M.T.C." (Greg Norton) – 1:09
8. "Don't Have a Life" (Norton) – 2:09

Side two – 14:08

1. "Bricklayer" (Mould) – 0:53
2. "Tired of Doing Things" (Hart) – 0:58
3. "You're Naive" (Mould) – 0:53
4. "Strange Week" (Hart) – 0:57
5. "Do the Bee" (Hart) – 1:49
6. "Big Sky" (Mould) – 0:57
7. "Ultracore" (Mould) – 0:47
8. "Let's Go Die" (Norton) – 1:26
9. "Data Control" (Hart) – 5:28

== Personnel ==
Adapted from the album's liner notes.

Hüsker Dü

- Bob Mould – guitar, vocals
- Greg Norton – bass, vocals
- Grant Hart – drums, vocals

Technical

- Hüsker Dü – producer, mixdown
- Steve Fjelstad – remote mix, mixdown
- Terry Katzman – remote mix assistant
- Doug Remley – remote mix assistant
- Wayne B. Case – remote mix assistant
- Fake Name Grafx – artwork
