= Statues (Hüsker Dü song) =

Single by Hüsker Dü
- B-side: "Amusement"
- Released: January 1981
- Recorded: August 1980
- Studio: Blackberry Way, Minneapolis, Minnesota
- Genre: Post-punk
- Length: 4:14
- Label: Reflex
- Songwriter(s): Grant Hart
- Producer(s): Hüsker Dü; Colin Mansfield

Hüsker Dü singles chronology
"Statues" (1981)	"In a Free Land" (1982)

"Statues" is a song by Hüsker Dü released as a single in 1981. It was the band's first single, b/w the song "Amusement". This release finds the band in a period where its music was drifting from punk to post-punk. Forty years after its release, Briony Edwards of Louder wrote, "Though it shows an interest in experimentation that would follow the band through each stage of their career, the ... Krautrock inspired, Keith Levene-esque guitar is far removed from the boisterous hardcore that followed in its wake." The single's pressing was limited to 2,000 copies. The two tracks appear on the Everything Falls Apart and More CD.

In 2013, the Numero Group reissued the single with the studio outtakes "Writer's Cramp" and "Let's Go Die" as a 7-inch pairing in a gatefold jacket. The studio recordings are remastered from a first-generation sub-master, while "Amusement" is from the original live board tape.

== Track listing ==
Side one
No.	Title	Writer(s)	Length
1.	"Statues"	Grant Hart	4:14

Side two
No.	Title	Writer(s)	Length
1.	"Amusement"	Bob Mould	4:19

=== 2013 reissue track listing ===
Side one
No.	Title	Writer(s)	Length
1.	"Statues"	Hart	4:29

Side two
No.	Title	Writer(s)	Length
2.	"Amusement"	Mould	5:11

Side three
No.	Title	Writer(s)	Length
1.	"Writers Cramp"	Mould	2:22

Side four
No.	Title	Writer(s)	Length
2.	"Let's Go Die"	Greg Norton	1:55

Notes

- "Statues", "Writers Cramp" and "Let's Go Die" were recorded at Blackberry Way, Minneapolis, August 1980
- "Amusement" was recorded live at Duffy's, Minneapolis, October 1980. The 2013 version has a later fadeout than the original single.
- The timings on the original single are not accurate. The 2013 timing is correct for Statues. The timing for the original version of Amusement is around 4:59.

== Personnel ==
Adapted from the liner notes of Everything Falls Apart and More.

Hüsker Dü

- Bob Mould – guitar, vocals,
- Grant Hart – drums, vocals
- Greg Norton – bass, vocals

Technical

- Hüsker Dü – producer (all tracks)
- Colin Mansfield – producer ("Statues", "Writers Cramp", "Let's Go Die"), engineer ("Amusement")
- Steve Fjelstad – engineer (all tracks)
- Terry Katzman – recorded by ("Amusement")
- Fake Name Graphx – artwork
