= Reflex Records =

American record label

- Founded: 1979
- Founder: Terry Katzman; Bob Mould; Grant Hart; Greg Norton
- Defunct: 1985
- Genre: Alternative rock; punk
- Country of origin: U.S.
- Location: Minneapolis, Minnesota

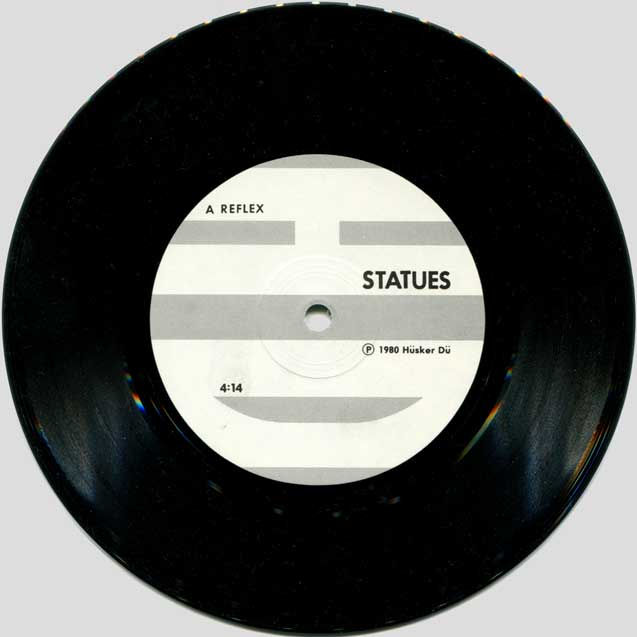
A-side of the vinyl 45rpm single "Statues" by Hüsker Dü, the first release by Reflex Records

Reflex Records was an American independent record label formed by the members of hardcore punk band Hüsker Dü and Terry Katzman. It was formed to help promote independent bands, after Twin/Tone Records rejected Hüsker Dü's first single in 1979. (Bassist Greg Norton told Rolling Stone in 2017 that the label was named after their experience with Twin/Tone: "We named our label Reflex Records because that was our reflex to being rejected.")

The label was funded by a loan from Hüsker drummer Grant Hart's mother's credit union.

Under Katzman's guidance, the label would also release several compilations of regional underground and alternative bands, as well as albums by local post-punk bands Rifle Sport, Man Sized Action, Otto's Chemical Lounge, and Articles of Faith, as well as the Minutemen's 1985 EP Tour-Spiel.

Both Katzman and the Hüsker Dü members became too busy with other projects, and the label quietly folded in 1985.

In 2008, Hart revived the Reflex name to issue a three-song live CD by Hüsker Dü recorded in 1982-83 featuring their friend John Clegg on saxophone, Live Featuring J.C.

== Discography ==
- Hüsker Dü, "Statues" b/w "Amusement" 7-inch single (1981)
- Barefoot and Pregnant cassette compilation (1982)
- Kitten cassette compilation (1982)
- Hüsker Dü, Everything Falls Apart 12-inch LP (1983)
- Rifle Sport, Voice of Reason 12-inch LP (1983)
- Man Sized Action, Claustrophobia 12-inch LP (1983)
- Final Conflict, Final Conflict 7" four-song EP (1983)
- Ground Zero, Ground Zero 12-inch LP (1983)
- Articles of Faith, Give Thanks 12-inch LP (1983)
- Man Sized Action, Five-Story Garage 12-inch LP (1984)
- Ground Zero, Pink 12-inch LP (1985)
- Minutemen, Tour-Spiel 7" four-song EP (1985)
- Hüsker Dü, Live Featuring J.C. (2008)
- Hüsker Dü, Tonite LONGHORN (2023)
