= In a Free Land =

"In A Free Land"

Single by Hüsker Dü
- Released: May 1982
- Recorded: February 1982 at Blackberry Way, Minneapolis, Minnesota
- Genre: Hardcore punk
- Length: 2:50
- Label: New Alliance Records
- Songwriter: Bob Mould
- Producers: Steve Fjelstad and Hüsker Dü

Hüsker Dü singles chronology
"Statues" (1981)	"In A Free Land" (1982)	"Eight Miles High" (1984)

"In A Free Land" is a song written by Bob Mould and performed by his band Hüsker Dü and released as a single in 1982. It was the band's second single.

The sound is still hardcore punk, but it does have a hint of their future melodic style, particularly on the title track.

The single's pressing was limited to 2,500 copies upon its release, along with an unknown number that contained a lyric insert.

The three tracks, in remixed form (a necessity since the original two-track master was lost by the pressing plant hired by New Alliance), appear on the Everything Falls Apart and More CD. The loss of the original two-track master to this EP may have led to a popular rumor that the stereo master to Everything Falls Apart itself had been lost.

The title track was covered by the New Jersey hardcore band Ensign on their 2003 album Love the Music, Hate the Kids.

In 2009, at the All Tomorrow's Parties festival in New York City, Mould teamed up with members of No Age to perform the song, the first time the song has been performed live since 1987.

On 16 April 2016, it was re-released for Record Store Day in 7" vinyl by MVD Audio. Copies were limited to 2000.

In November 2016, Mould released a live version as part of the 1,000 Days, 1,000 Songs campaign in which musicians put out previously unreleased music in protest of then-presidential candidate Donald Trump.

== Track listing ==
Side One

1. "In A Free Land" (Mould) 2:50

Side Two

1. "What Do I Want?" (Hart) 1:16
2. "M.I.C." (Mould) 1:07
