= Hüsker Dü =

American punk rock band (1979–1988)

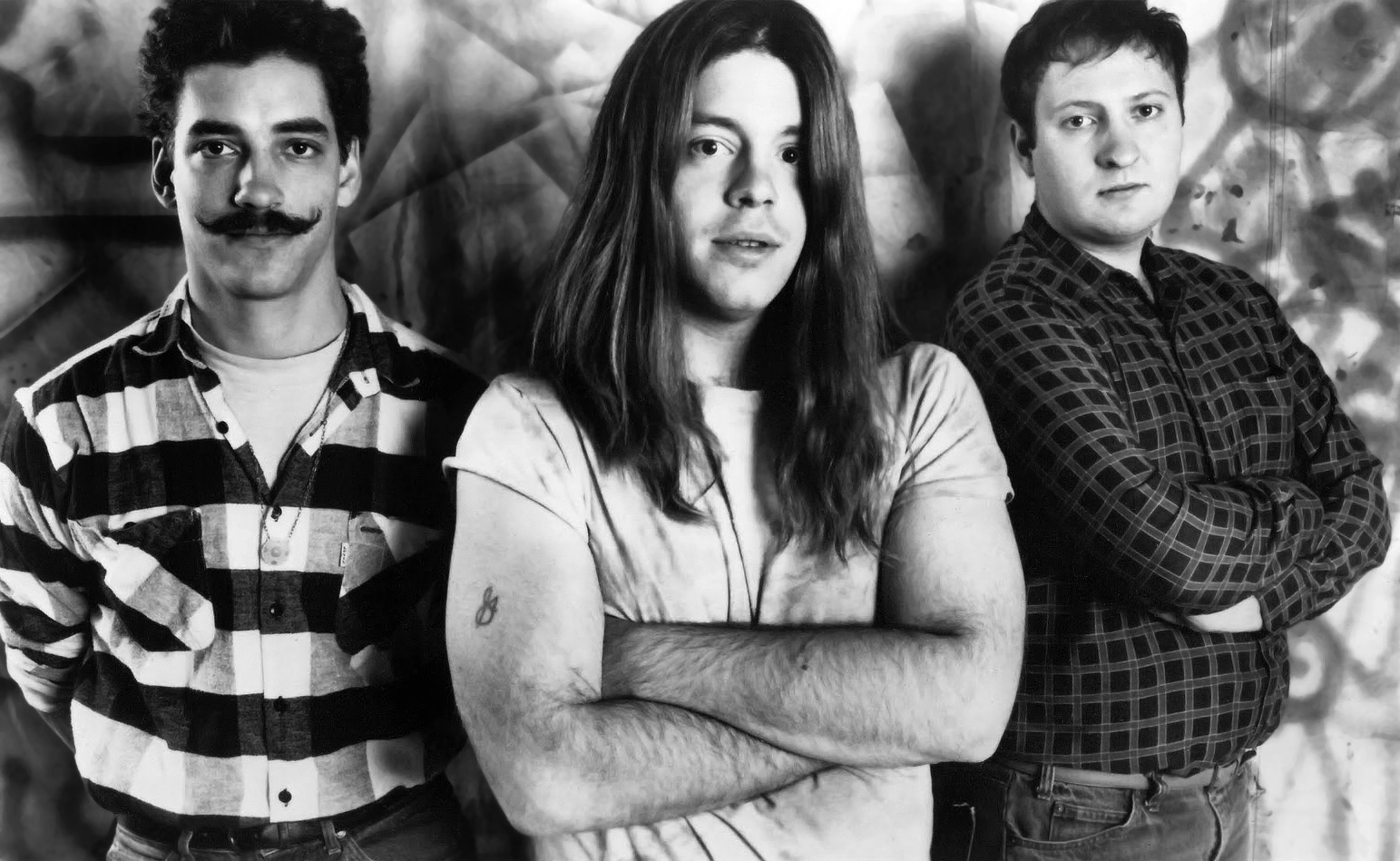
- Hüsker Dü in 1986. Left to right: Greg Norton, Grant Hart, and Bob Mould.

Background information
- Origin: Saint Paul, Minnesota, U.S.
- Genres: Hardcore punk; post-hardcore; punk rock; alternative rock
- Works: Discography
- Years active: 1979–1988
- Labels: Reflex; Alternative Tentacles; New Alliance; SST; Warner Bros.
- Spinoffs: Sugar; Nova Mob
- Past members: Grant Hart; Bob Mould; Greg Norton

Hüsker Dü (/ˈhʊskər ˈduː/) was an American punk rock band formed in Saint Paul, Minnesota, in 1979. The band's continuous members were guitarist/vocalist Bob Mould, bassist Greg Norton, and drummer/vocalist Grant Hart. They first gained notability as a hardcore punk band, and later crossed over into alternative rock. Mould and Hart were the band's principal songwriters, with Hart's higher-pitched vocals and Mould's baritone taking the lead in alternating songs.

The band issued their debut studio album Everything Falls Apart on Reflex Records in 1983 and subsequently released three albums and an EP on the independent label SST Records, including the critically acclaimed Zen Arcade in 1984. Hüsker Dü signed to major label Warner Bros. Records in 1986 to release their final two studio albums. They disbanded in 1988. Mould later released two solo albums before forming Sugar in the early 1990s, while Hart released a solo album on SST and later formed Nova Mob.

After their respective bands broke up in the mid-1990s, Mould and Hart continued doing solo work, the latter until his death in 2017. Norton worked as a restaurateur and returned to the recording industry in 2006.

== History ==
=== Formation and early years (1979–1980) ===
The members of Hüsker Dü first met in the fall of 1978. At the time, Mould was a freshman at Macalester College in Saint Paul and frequented nearby Cheapo Records, a Saint Paul record store where Hart was a sales clerk. Hart and Norton had originally met while applying for the same job, which Norton eventually got. Hart and Mould bonded over a shared love of the Ramones. According to an interview with Mould by Terry Katzman in City Pages in 1980, Mould, Hart and Norton first met in person at a concert featuring the Ramones and Foreigner, and quickly became friends. Soon after, they enlisted Mould and keyboardist Charlie Pine to form a band. They began gigging, playing mostly cover songs, some classic rock, and punk rock such as the Ramones and Johnny Thunders. Unbeknownst to Pine, the remaining band members disliked the sound of the band with Pine's keyboards and began practicing without him, writing a few originals.

The new name originated during a rehearsal of the Talking Heads's "Psycho Killer". Unable to recall the French portions sung in the original (e.g., Qu'est-ce que c'est?), they instead started shouting any foreign-language words they could remember, including the title of the popular 1950s memory board game Hūsker Dū? (the phrase without diacritics meaning "do you remember?" in Danish and Norwegian). The name stuck, and they added heavy metal umlauts to it. Mould said that they liked the somewhat mysterious qualities of the name and that it set them apart from other hardcore punk groups with names like "Social Red Youth Dynasty Brigade Distortion". Mould also said that, while Hüsker Dü enjoyed hardcore punk in general, they never thought of themselves as exclusively a hardcore group and that their name was an attempt to avoid being pigeonholed as such.

The band played their first gig on March 30, 1979, at Ron's Randolph Inn in St. Paul, a bar near the Macalester campus. Hart, Mould, and Norton fired Pine during their third performance on April 20, 1979, and continued as a trio. That summer, the band played their first gigs at Jay's Longhorn Bar, the center of the Minneapolis punk scene. Recordings of these shows would eventually be released on the Tonite Longhorn LP in 2023.

By 1980, the band was performing regularly in Minneapolis-St. Paul, and their music evolved into a fast, ferocious, primal sound, making them one of the original hardcore punk bands of the Midwest. Through heavy touring, they soon caught the attention of punk trailblazers including Black Flag and Dead Kennedys' Jello Biafra, who helped introduce Hüsker Dü to new fans. Black Flag guitarist/songwriter Greg Ginn later signed the band to his label, SST Records.

=== Early releases (1981–1983) ===
The band released the "Statues" single on their own Reflex Records in January 1981. Playing a show in Chicago brought them to the attention of Black Flag. When Hüsker Dü were ready to release their first album Land Speed Record, Black Flag's label, SST, was not able to release it at that time and pointed them to the Minutemen who did release it and the 7-inch EP "In a Free Land" on their label New Alliance Records. The band was hoping to release their next record, the mini album Everything Falls Apart, on SST, but the label still wasn't in the position to do so and they ended up putting it out on Reflex. SST was finally able to release their next record, the Metal Circus EP, in 1983.

Hüsker Dü's more melodic take on hardcore struck a chord with college students, and various tracks from Metal Circus, particularly Hart's "Diane", were put into rotation by dozens of campus radio stations across the U.S. In addition, on Metal Circus the band showed more invention, skill, and melody than it did over the course of their previous full album, Everything Falls Apart. In a 1983 interview, Mould recalled the reason the band turned down an offer to sign with major label Elektra Records during the band's first few years:

...there is nothing wrong with being on one of those labels, but we're not ready yet 'cos I'm not ready to sign my life away and secondly we don't exactly have a big plan [regarding] how much stuff we are going to turn over to a label like that. As far as artistic control...

While the band at this time was still firmly rooted in the loud, fast punk rock style, the trio were beginning to experiment with songs featuring a more melodic, though no less aggressive, sound. "The early Hüsker stuff was all very fast and furious," Mould reflected in 1997, "as a result of being 18 and not really proficient with the instruments. But I was always writing with an ear to melody."

=== Zen Arcade, New Day Rising and Flip Your Wig (1983–1985) ===
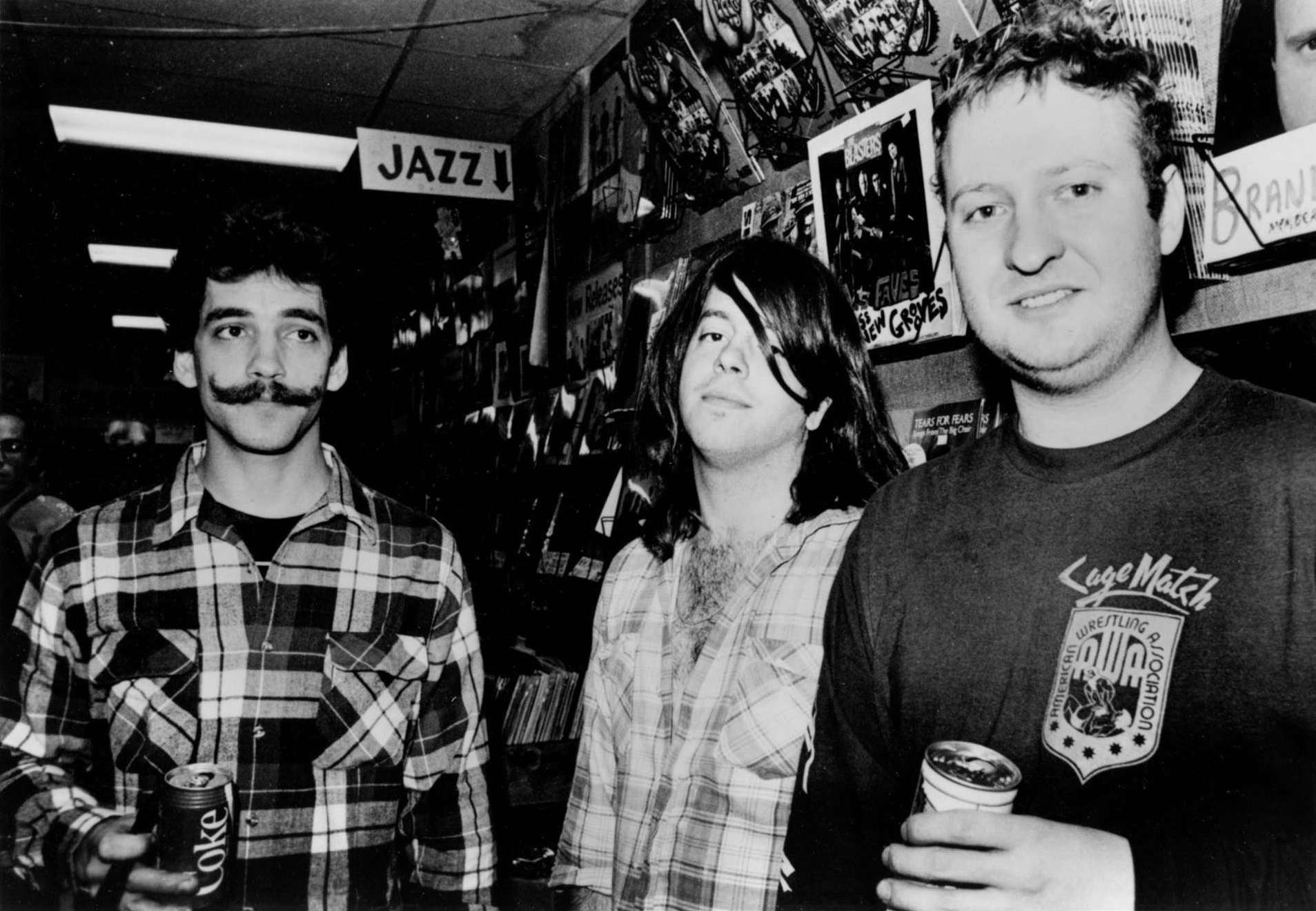
Hüsker Dü in a 1985 publicity photo for New Day Rising

By 1983, the members of Hüsker Dü wanted to create music outside of the confines and restrictions of hardcore. In an interview with Matter in 1983, Mould told interviewer Steve Albini, "We're going to try to do something bigger than anything like rock & roll and the whole puny touring band idea. I don't know what it's going to be, we have to work that out, but it's going to go beyond the whole idea of 'punk rock' or whatever."

The following year, Hüsker Dü recorded the double album Zen Arcade in 45 hours for the cost of $3,200. Zen Arcade is a concept album following a boy who leaves home to face a harsh and unforgiving world. Its artistic and conceptual ambitions were a great stretch given the purist sentiment then prevalent in U.S. punk rock. Zen Arcade received critical praise and significant mainstream music press attention, ending up on several year-end best-of lists. It also helped expand the band's audience beyond the punk community. In his review for Rolling Stone, David Fricke described Zen Arcade as "the closest hardcore will ever get to an opera ... a kind of thrash Quadrophenia."

In 1989, Zen Arcade was ranked No. 33 on Rolling Stone's list of the 100 greatest albums of the 1980s. SST erred on the side of caution and initially pressed between 3,500 and 5,000 copies of the album, but the record sold out a few weeks into the band's tour in support of the record. The album remained out of stock for months afterward, which affected sales and frustrated the band.

"Celebrated Summer"
Sample of "Celebrated Summer" from New Day Rising

Hüsker Dü started recording Zen Arcade's follow-up album, New Day Rising, just as Zen Arcade was released. The band's next album, Flip Your Wig, was released nine months after New Day Rising. Flip Your Wig became the first album released on an independent record label to top the CMJ album chart.

At year's end, both New Day Rising and Flip Your Wig ranked in the top ten of the Village Voice annual Pazz & Jop critics' poll. The swift succession of dynamic albums highlighted the creative evolution of the band.

=== Signing with Warner Bros.; Candy Apple Grey (1985–1986) ===
During the recording sessions for Flip Your Wig, Warner Bros. Records approached Hüsker Dü and offered the group a recording contract. The band felt it had hit a sales ceiling that it could break through only with the help of a larger label. The promise of the band retaining complete creative control over its music convinced the band to sign with the label. Mould also cited distribution problems with SST as a reason for the move, noting that sometimes there were no records to sign at promotional events.

Hüsker Dü was not expected to sell a large number of records. Rather, Warner Bros. valued the group's grassroots fanbase and "hip" status, and by keeping the overhead low, the label anticipated the band would turn a profit.

Candy Apple Grey was their first major-label album, though Warner Bros. had initially lobbied to release Flip Your Wig until the band opted for its release on SST. Candy Apple Grey was the first Hüsker Dü album to chart on the Billboard Top 200, but despite receiving exposure on radio as well as MTV, it could get no higher than No. 140.

=== Warehouse: Songs and Stories and breakup (1987–1988) ===
Creative and personal tensions between Mould and Hart intensified. With Mould already doing most of the band's managerial duties, bringing in David Savoy to help with that end, Savoy's suicide on the eve of the band's 1987 tour in support of the double album Warehouse: Songs and Stories threw the band into a tailspin. In September 2006, Hart told Britain's Q magazine, "I take full responsibility for [Savoy's] suicide. It was a direct result of the pressure of working for Bob and me, because he was being forced into a two-faced situation." Mould called Savoy's suicide "the beginning of the end."

The promotional tour for Warehouse: Songs and Stories included some of the highest profile television appearances in the band's career, including performances on The Late Show Starring Joan Rivers and the NBC morning news program Today.

The band dissolved after a show in Columbia, Missouri, on the band's December 1987 tour. Hart was trying to quit heroin using a supply of methadone, but the bottle had leaked. Hart still played the show, but Mould and Norton were concerned he would be unable to play the remaining shows due to withdrawal. While Hart insisted he could perform, Mould had already canceled the remaining dates. Mould has said that the breakup was about "three people going their separate ways," referring to Hart's drug use and new relationship, Norton's recent marriage and new business, and Mould himself having quit a lifelong drinking habit back in 1986. After a band meeting on January 26, 1988, Mould decided to leave the band and made it official two days later.

The Living End, a live collection taken from the band's October 1987 tour, was released in 1994. Mould has said he has never listened to this album.

=== Post-breakup (1989–present) ===
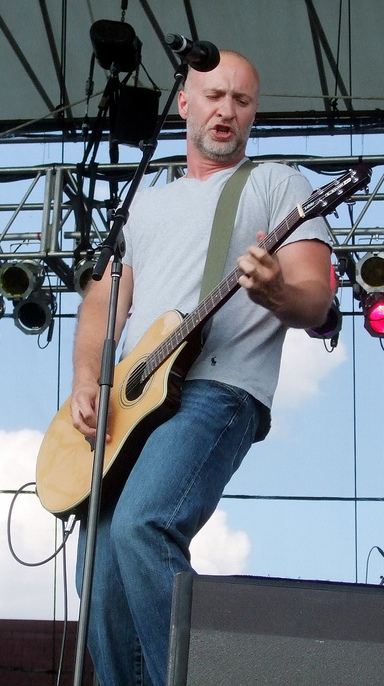
Bob Mould, July 2007 at McCarren Park Pool

Mould and Hart produced solo albums and formed the bands Sugar and Nova Mob, respectively. Mould also joined Richard Morel in the band Blowoff. In 2005, after retiring from playing shows with an electric band in 1998, Mould returned to touring with a band and included Hüsker Dü and Sugar songs in his sets. His album Silver Age, which came soon after the reissue of Sugar's two full-length albums in 2012, was widely acclaimed as a return to form. Mould's backing band features Jason Narducy (Verbow, Split Single) and Jon Wurster (Superchunk, the Mountain Goats) on bass and drums, respectively. Norton formed the band Grey Area, played with Shotgun Rationale, and became a chef. He and his ex-wife Sarah owned a restaurant in Red Wing, Minnesota, called The Nortons', until 2010. In addition to his restaurant duties, in 2006 Norton returned to music as the bassist for the Minnesota-based band the Gang Font, featuring Interloper. The group released an eponymous album in 2007. In 2016, Norton also joined the Wisconsin indie rock band Porcupine, actively performing and recording with them.

On October 21, 2004, Mould and Hart reunited at a Minneapolis benefit concert for ailing Soul Asylum bassist Karl Mueller, who had been receiving treatment for cancer. At the end of what had been scheduled as a solo set by Mould, he brought out Hart to play "Never Talking To You Again" and "Hardly Getting Over It". Mould noted that the performance should not ignite any "false hope" for a reunion.

On October 12, 2015, Hüsker Dü launched an official website, which is an online merchandise store. Norton told the Star Tribune that he, Mould, and Hart had worked out a licensing agreement for their music and that a Facebook page is "likely to go online soon." When asked about a possible Hüsker Dü reunion, Norton replied, "The main thing is, there's ongoing communication between the three of us now."

Hart died of liver cancer on September 13, 2017, at the age of 56. In a public statement, Mould remembered his former bandmate as "a gifted visual artist, a wonderful storyteller, and a frighteningly talented musician. Everyone touched by his spirit will always remember."

On November 10, 2017, the Numero Group label released the three-CD/four-LP box set Savage Young Dü, which spans the band's first four years, containing demos, studio, and live recordings.

On March 30, 2019, the 40th anniversary of the first Hüsker Dü show in St. Paul, Bob Mould played a concert in St. Paul, in which he was supported by the band Porcupine, featuring Greg Norton. To commemorate the occasion, both former Hüsker Dü members paid tribute to their late bandmate Grant Hart, and included one of his songs in their sets, with Mould performing "Never Talking to You Again" and Porcupine performing their cover of "Standing by the Sea".

== Musical style and influences ==
The band's logo

Hüsker Dü started as a hardcore punk band. Huw Baines of Guitar.com said: "If there's one word that describes Hüsker Dü it's speed." While the band included some slower material earlier in its career, Hüsker Dü developed a fast repertoire as a result of having less time to play while billed as an opening act, and to antagonize their audience when it headlined shows. "[T]here was a point where we were, like, 'Let's see how fast we can play,'" Norton recalled. "I guess we were just trying to blow people away." Hüsker Dü was particularly influenced by punk bands like D.O.A., Dead Kennedys, and The Fartz after seeing them play. NME journalist Andy Gill contended that Hüsker Dü's characteristic sound crystalized on the Metal Circus EP, incorporating "thunderbuck, hiccup" drums, a melodic yet solid bass, and "carillions [sic] of distorted guitar, with shouted vocals rasping hoarsely from deep in the mix." He argued that what set them apart from other punk bands was "the way they mix those same structural devices in ways that shouldn't work, combining elements of several genres in one song."

As the band's career progressed, Hüsker Dü emphasized melody in their songs. Unlike other hardcore bands, Hüsker Dü did not disavow classic rock. "You know the whole deal with tearing down the old to make room for the new?" Hart posited. "Well, music isn't city planning." The band covered 1960s hits like Donovan's "Sunshine Superman" and the Byrds' "Eight Miles High" early in their career. As the band members progressed as musicians, they discovered they were able to play at slower tempos while still maintaining the rhythm, allowing for extended melodies.

Hart and Mould were the band's songwriters. Both wrote their songs separately and at a prodigious pace. In later years, Hart accused Mould of making sure his songs comprised no more than 45 percent of the material on an album. They designed their logo to represent their common train of thought—a circle enclosing three parallel horizontal lines with a vertical line connecting them. The circle symbolized the band: the three lines were the individual members, and the intersecting line was the common thread of creativity that connected them.

Critically, the band has been labeled as primarily hardcore punk, post-hardcore, punk rock, and alternative rock. They have also been labeled as noise pop and post-punk. According to Stephen Thomas Erlewine of AllMusic, Hüsker Dü's music combined the "screaming self-examination of Bob Mould with the biting pop-romanticism of Grant Hart.

== Legacy and impact ==
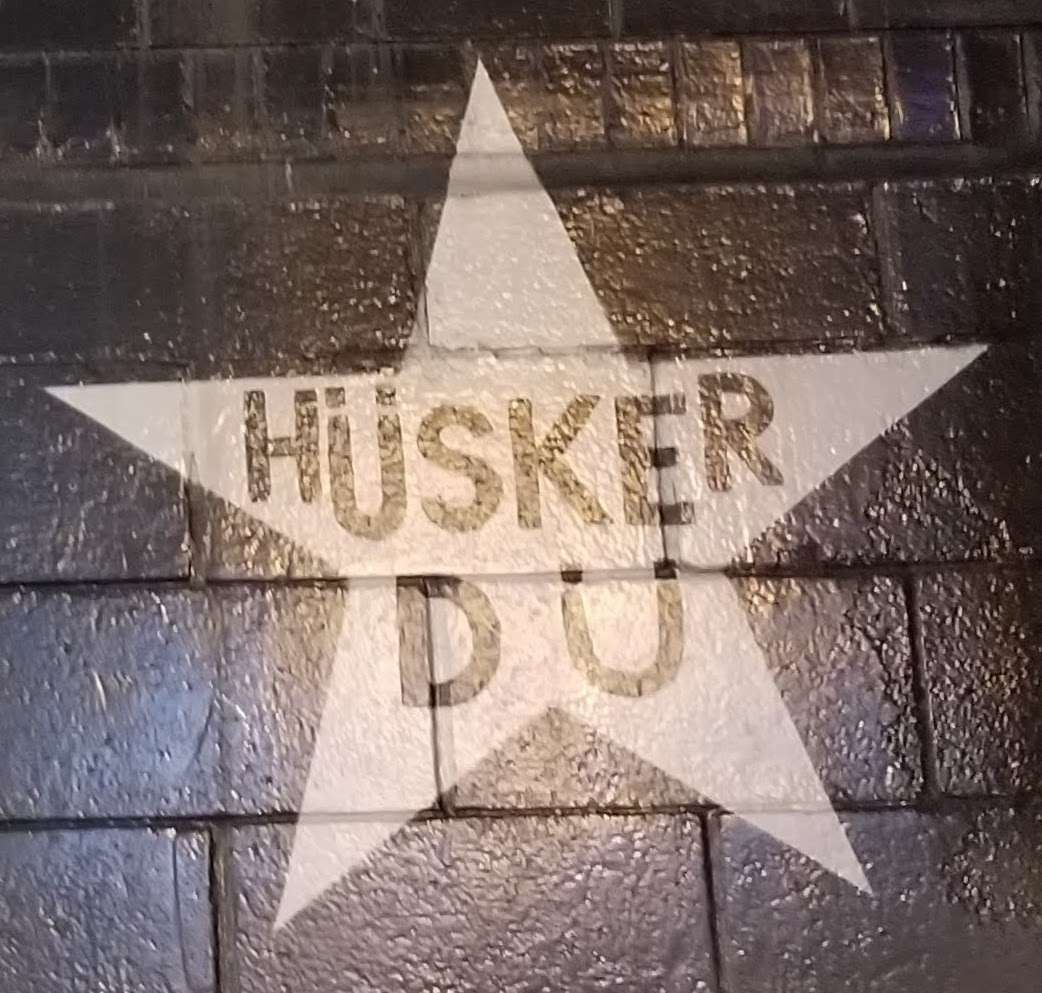
Hüsker Dü's star on the outside mural of the Minneapolis nightclub First Avenue

Hüsker Dü is widely regarded as one of the key bands to emerge from the 1980s American indie scene. Music writer Michael Azerrad asserted in his 2001 book Our Band Could Be Your Life that Hüsker Dü was the key link between hardcore punk and the more melodic, diverse music of college rock that emerged. Azerrad wrote, "Hüsker Dü played a huge role in convincing the underground that melody and punk rock weren't antithetical." According to Stephen Thomas Erlewine of AllMusic said the band laid the groundwork for the "roaring punk-pop" that achieved mainstream popularity in the 1990s, explaining, "Not only did they shape the sound of the music, they shaped the way independent bands made the transition to the major labels; they showed other bands that it was possible to record uncompromising music on a major label without losing any integrity or creative control." The band helped set a new precedent by being one of the first bands from the American indie scene to sign to a major record label, which helped establish college rock as "a viable commercial enterprise." According to Consequence, "the band's near-flawless trifecta of Zen Arcade, New Day Rising, and Flip Your Wig – all recorded between 1984 and 1985 – pretty much penned the sonic script for every guitar rock band that followed in its wake."

Numerous bands have cited Husker Du as a pivotal influence on their work. Nirvana bassist Krist Novoselic said that Nirvana's musical style was "nothing new; Hüsker Dü did it before us." Andy Cairns, frontman of the Northern Irish alternative rock band Therapy? cited Hüsker Dü as an influence while additionally listing Zen Arcade as his seventh-favorite album of all time, in addition to his band covering "Diane" on their 1995 album, Infernal Love. Green Day's Billie Joe Armstrong said, "There are no words that describe the huge impact Grant Hart and Bob Mould's music [had] on Green Day. We were 16 years old. Hüsker Dü was our favorite band. We became a three-piece because of Hüsker. We went through adolescence listening to this band. I wanted to be a songwriter because of Hüsker Dü. To put it simply, there would be no Green Day if it wasn't for Hüsker Dü. Steve Brooks of Torche and Floor said, “Hüsker Dü changed my life. That was a huge influence on me." The bands have often been compared to each other, and The Village Voice described Torche as "the legitimate sons of a union between Hüsker Dü and the Melvins." Additionally, Hüsker Dü has been cited as an influence by Alkaline Trio, the Offspring, Inspiral Carpets, the Hold Steady, Better Than Ezra frontman Kevin Griffin, Buffalo Tom, Superchunk, Swervedriver, The Fierce and the Dead, Rites of Spring, and Treepeople.

The band have also been cited as a favorite or as being admired by various other bands. Kim Deal joined Pixies in response to a classified ad placed by Black Francis seeking a female bassist who liked both Peter, Paul and Mary and Hüsker Dü. In an interview with Classic Rock Magazine, Goo Goo Dolls frontman John Rzeznik referred to Hüsker Dü as "the most underrated band ever." In an interview with Dave Fanning for RTÉ's Planet Rock Profiles before the Foo Fighters' appearance at the 1996 Féile Festival, Dave Grohl said of Zen Arcade, "That album was amazing. I mean, Black Flag was early on, and then when I discovered Zen Arcade I thought, God, these people write songs, man. It's amazing. It's like the Byrds meets Black Flag, and it just blew me away, and the songs just stuck in your head forever and they were just amazing. When that album, Zen Arcade, was recorded...I think it was recorded just straight, and I think they all took acid and recorded it in 48 hours. They did the whole album. That is what I had heard. And, to me, I was just like, God, these people are genius, you know? This is... this is amazing."

Hüsker Dü has been honored with a star on the outside mural of the Minneapolis nightclub First Avenue; Mould and Hart have also received stars for their solo work, making the band one of the few to be represented multiple times on the mural. The stars recognize performers that have played sold-out shows or have otherwise demonstrated a major contribution to the culture at the iconic venue. Receiving a star "might be the most prestigious public honor an artist can receive in Minneapolis," according to journalist Steve Marsh.

== Band members ==
- Grant Hart – vocals, drums, percussion, keyboards, piano (1979–1988; died 2017)
- Bob Mould – vocals, guitars, keyboards, piano, percussion, bass guitar (1979–1988)
- Greg Norton – bass guitar, vocals (1979–1988)

== Discography ==
Studio albums

- Everything Falls Apart (1983)
- Zen Arcade (1984)
- New Day Rising (1985)
- Flip Your Wig (1985)
- Candy Apple Grey (1986)
- Warehouse: Songs and Stories (1987)

== Bibliography ==
- Azerrad, Michael (2001). Our Band Could Be Your Life. Little, Brown, and Company. ISBN 0-316-78753-1.
- Earles, Andrew (2010) Hüsker Dü: The Story of the Noise-Pop Pioneers Who Launched Modern Rock
- Mould, Bob (2011). See a Little Light: The Trail of Rage and Melody. Little, Brown, and Company. ISBN 978-0-316-04508-7.
