= Greg Norton =

American bassist

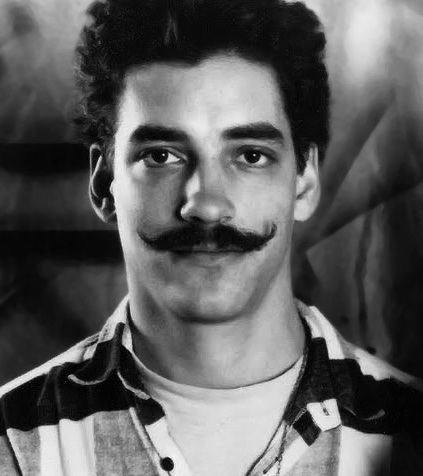
- Norton in 1986

Background information
- Born: Gregory James Norton; 13 March 1959 (age 67); Davenport, Iowa, U.S.
- Genres: Alternative rock; hardcore punk
- Occupation: Musician
- Instrument: Bass guitar
- Years active: 1979–1991, 2006–present
- Member of: UltraBomb
- Formerly of: Hüsker Dü; Grey Area; Porcupine; Gang Font feat. Interloper

Gregory James Norton (born 13 March 1959) is an American bassist, formerly of the band Hüsker Dü.

== Early life ==
Norton was born in Davenport, Iowa, as this was the most local Catholic hospital to his family’s home in Rock Island, Illinois. He attended Henry Sibley High School in Mendota Heights, Minnesota.

== Career ==
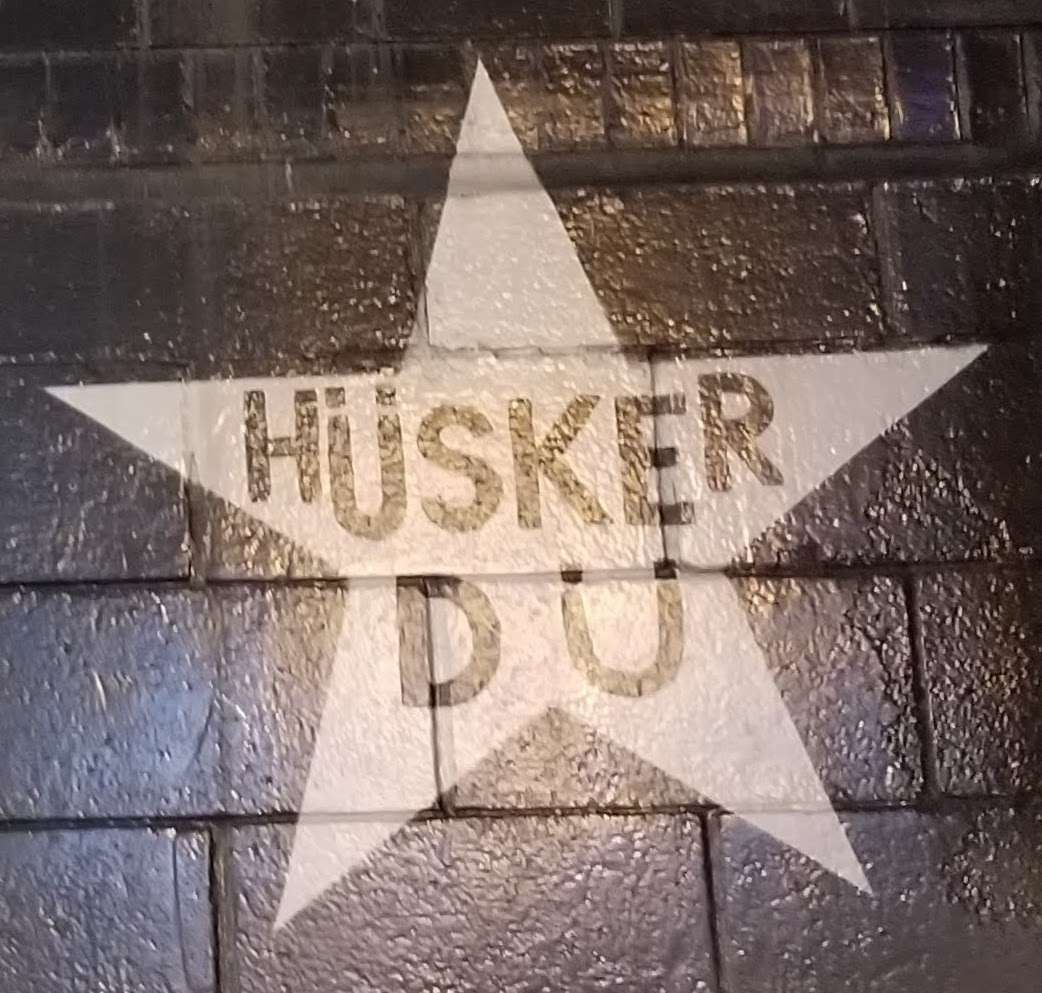
Hüsker Dü's star on the outside mural of the Minneapolis nightclub First Avenue

Norton first began playing with the band that would become Hüsker Dü with Grant Hart, Bob Mould, and keyboardist Charlie Pine in 1979 after meeting them through his job at the Saint Paul record store Cheapo Records.

Norton played bass on all of Hüsker Dü's recordings from its formation to its breakup. While the majority of the band's songwriting was done by bandmates Bob Mould and Grant Hart, Norton contributed the songs "M.T.C.", "Don't Have A Life", "Let's Go Die" and "Everytime".

After Hüsker Dü disbanded in 1988, Norton formed the band Grey Area with Colin Mansfield (Hüsker Dü engineer and former member of Fine Art) and Jo Jones. After Grey Area disbanded in 1991, Norton left the music business and opened The Norton's Restaurant (now closed) in Red Wing, Minnesota. Norton returned to the recording industry in 2006, with a new avant jazz band, Gang Font feat. Interloper. The group is composed of Norton, Dave King (of the Bad Plus, Happy Apple, Halloween, Alaska, 12 Rods and the Love-Cars), Erik Fratzke of Zebulon Pike and Happy Apple, and Craig Taborn.

In 2016, Norton joined La Crosse, Wisconsin band Porcupine as their bass player to replace Davey Reinders.

In 2022, Norton joined the band Ultrabomb as their bass player. However, before the band could begin its tour in the UK, Norton was diagnosed with prostate cancer. The band cancelled its planned appearances in England and Scotland so Norton could undergo treatment at the Mayo Clinic in the U.S. The band subsequently released its debut album, Dying to Smile, in 2024.

Norton has been honored with a star on the outside mural of the Minneapolis nightclub First Avenue for his work with Hüsker Dü. The stars recognize performers that have played sold-out shows or have otherwise demonstrated a major contribution to the culture at the iconic venue. Receiving a star "might be the most prestigious public honor an artist can receive in Minneapolis," according to journalist Steve Marsh.
