= Géza Peske =

Hungarian painter

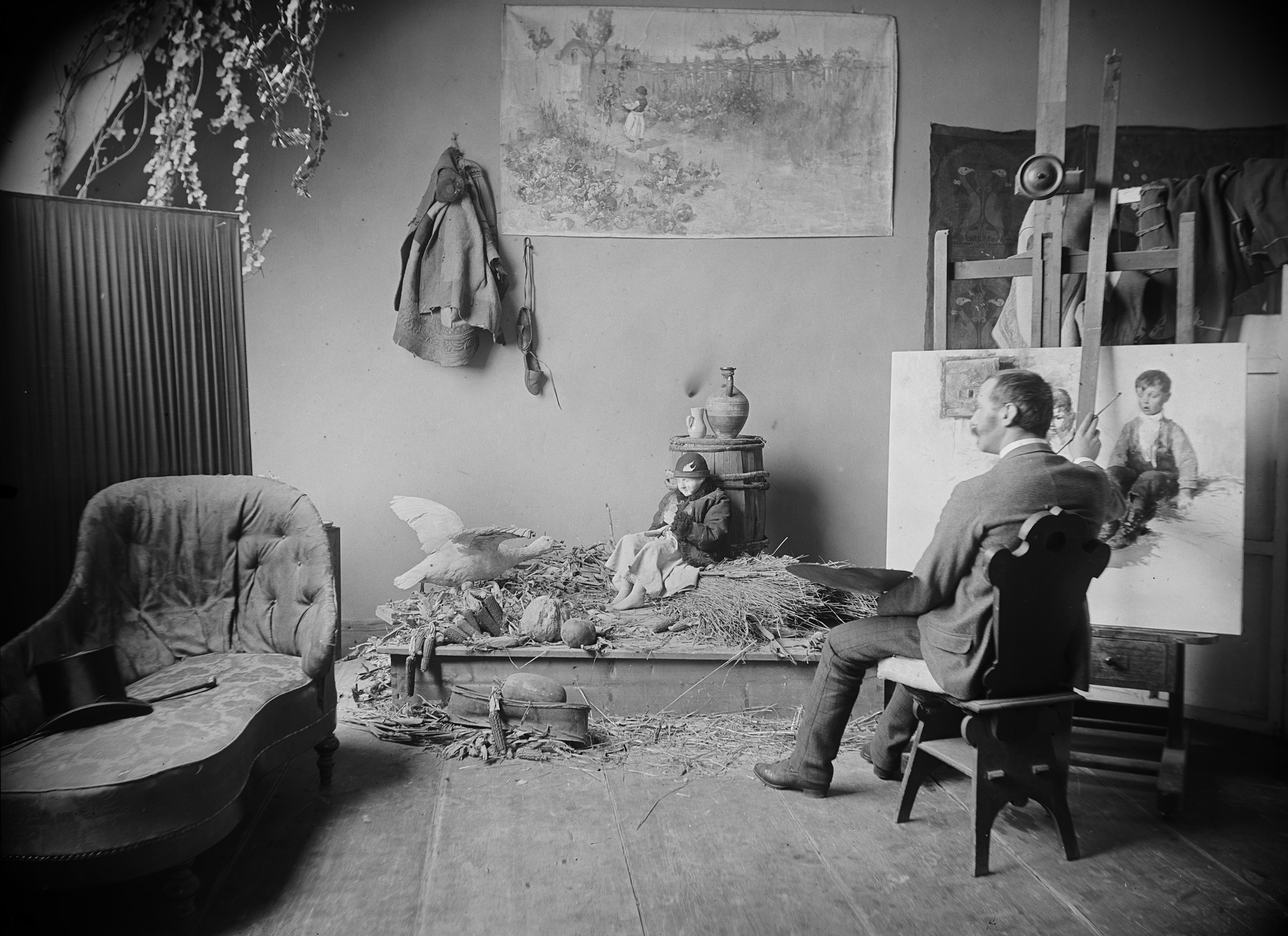
- Carl Teufel: Géza Peske in his Studio
- Born: 22 January 1859; Kelecsény (present-day Slovakia)
- Died: 18 May 1934; Bodajk, Hungary
- Known for: Painting, illustration
- Movement: genre works

Géza Peske (1859–1934) was a Hungarian painter.

He was born in Kelecsény Austria-Hungary. He studied under Gyula Benczúr and Ludwig von Löfftz at the Academy of Munich. He lived in Budapest since 1894. His most famous pictures genre works with children there are at Hungarian National Gallery. He died and buried in Bodajk, Hungary, where a street bears his name.

== Selected paintings ==
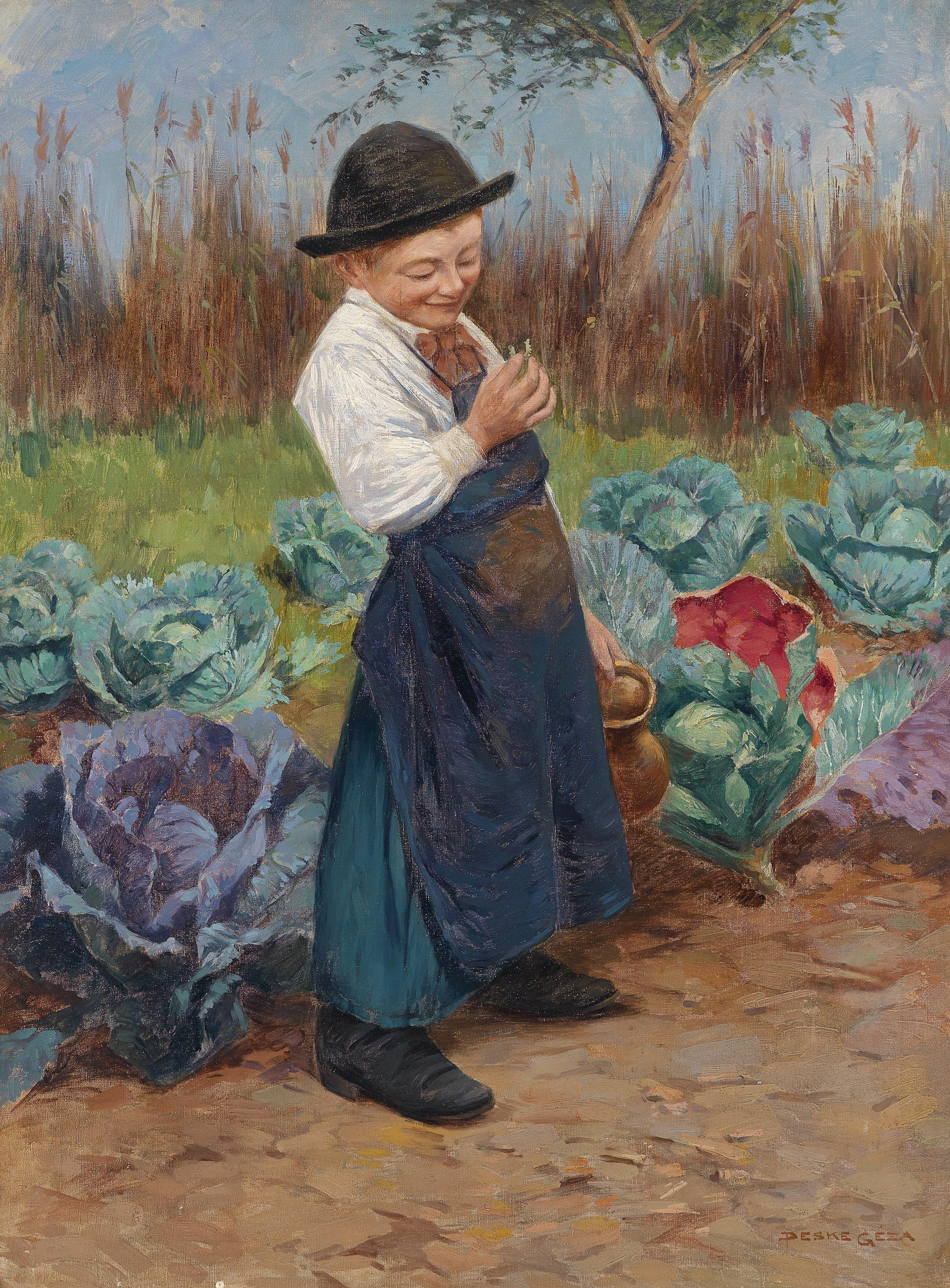
Little Gardener

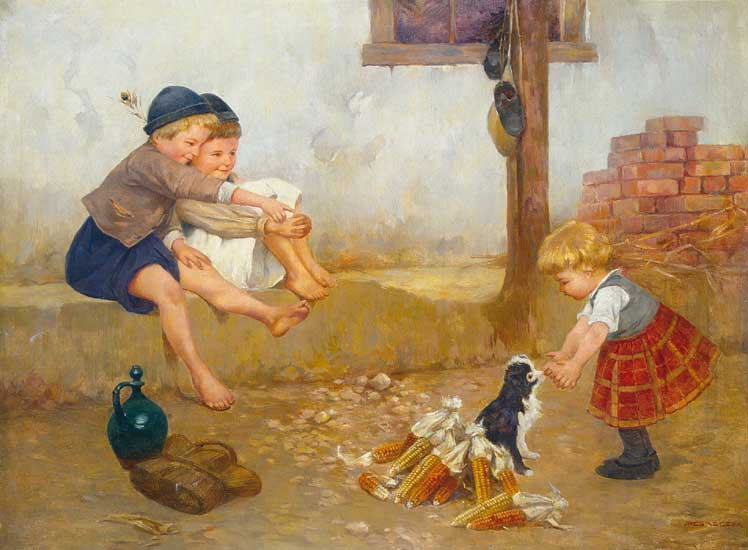
Playing Children

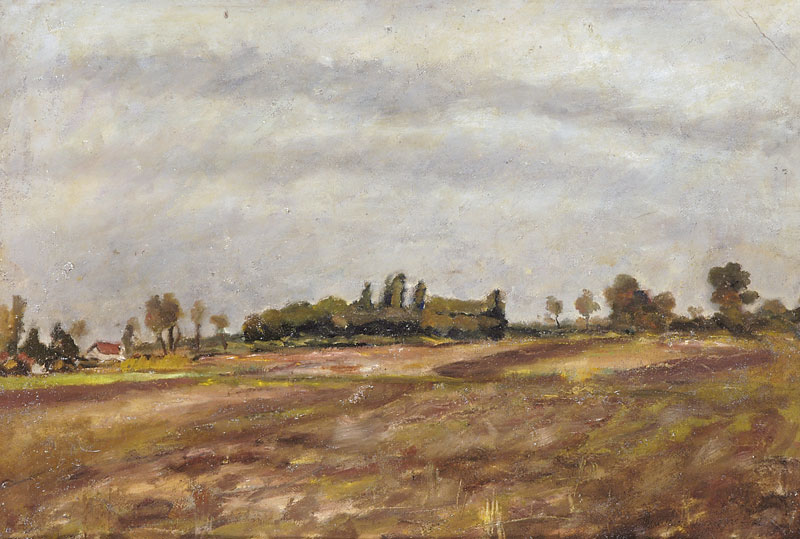
Monor Landscape (1920)

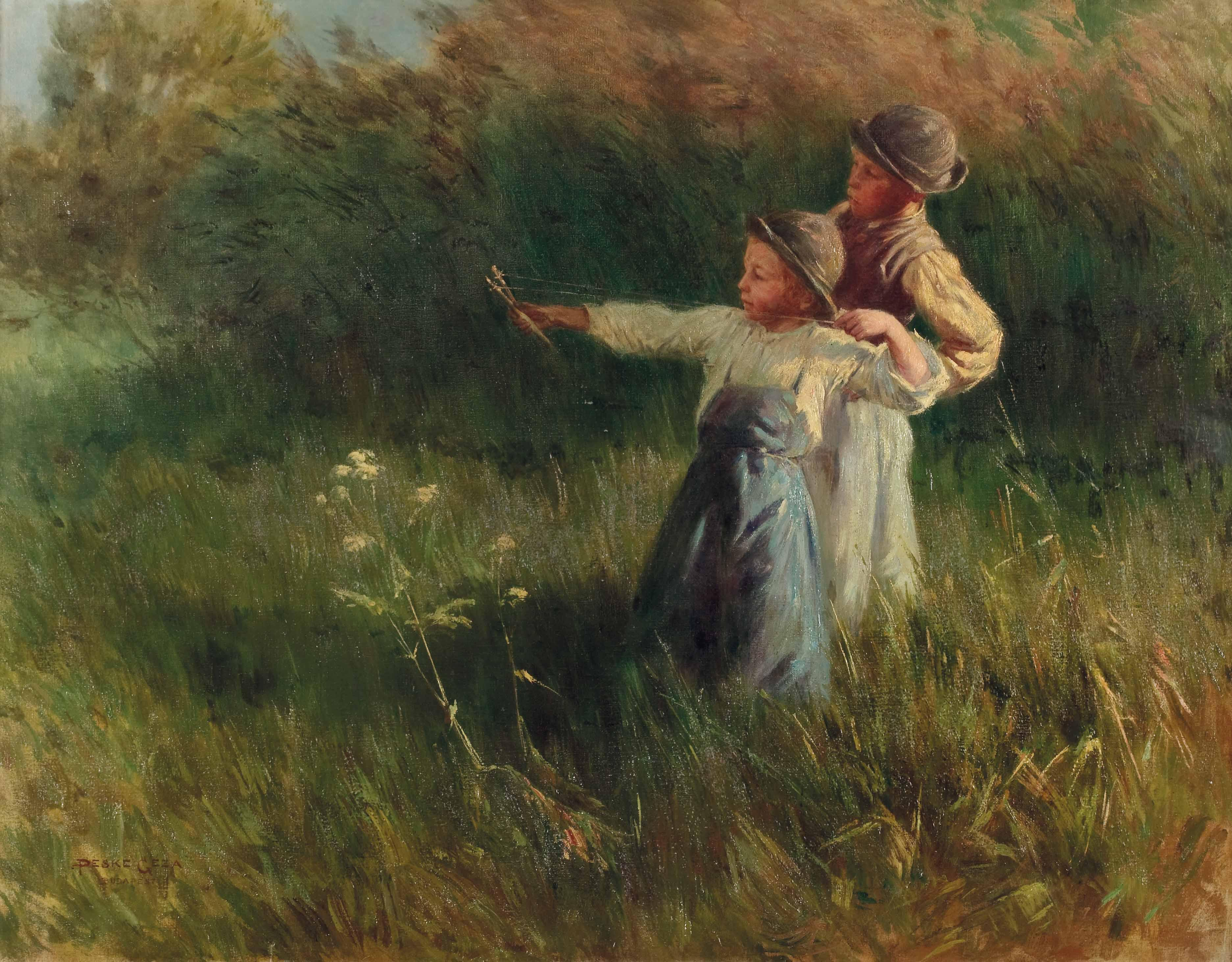
Two Boys with Slingshot on the Summer-meadow

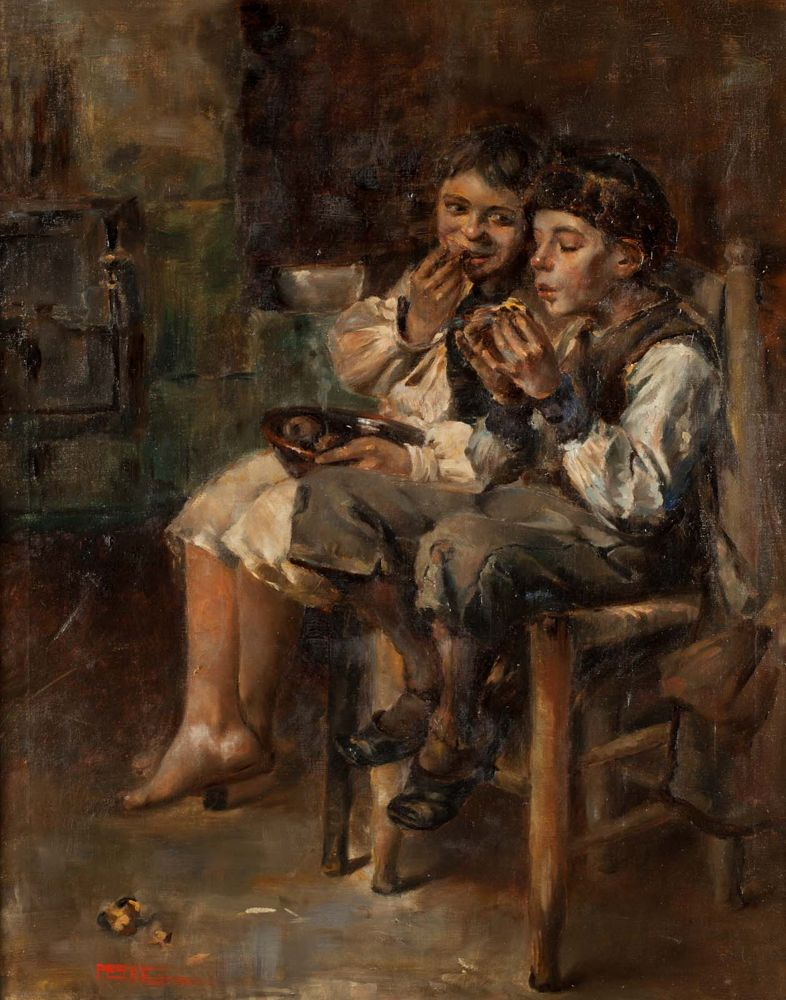
Potato-eaters

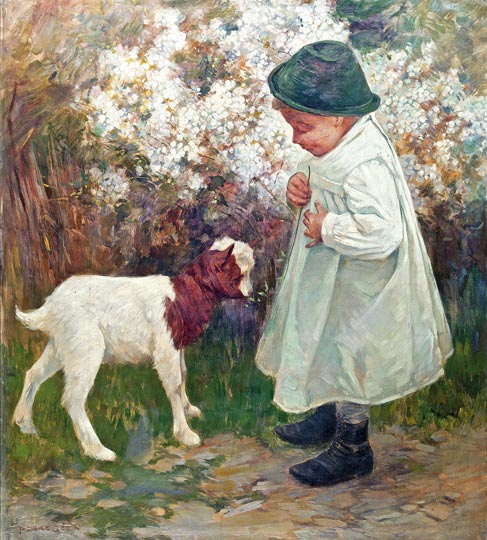
Little Girl with Goat
