= You'll Like My Mother =

1972 American horror-thriller film directed by Lamont Johnson

- Directed by: Lamont Johnson
- Screenplay by: Jo Heims
- Based on: You'll Like My Mother by Naomi A. Hintze
- Produced by: Mort Briskin
- Starring: Patty Duke; Rosemary Murphy; Richard Thomas; Sian Barbara Allen
- Cinematography: Jack A. Marta
- Edited by: Edward M. Abroms
- Music by: Gil Melle
- Color process: Technicolor
- Production company: Bing Crosby Productions
- Distributed by: Universal Pictures
- Release date: October 13, 1972
- Running time: 93 minutes
- Country: United States
- Language: English

You'll Like My Mother is a 1972 American horror-thriller film directed by Lamont Johnson, from screenplay by Jo Heims based on the novel of the same name by Naomi A. Hintze. The film stars Patty Duke, Rosemary Murphy, Richard Thomas and Sian Barbara Allen. The film follows a pregnant widow who travels to rural Minnesota to meet her mother-in-law, whom she discovers has sinister motives against her.

== Plot ==
Marrying after a short courtship, Francesca Kinsolving finds herself young, pregnant, and widowed when her husband Matthew is killed in a plane crash in Vietnam two weeks later. After writing and receiving no answer from his relatives, a heavily pregnant Francesca travels by bus from Los Angeles to rural Northeastern Minnesota to meet her late husband's mother, Maria Kinsolving. Her husband had told her that she would be welcomed at the home and that she "would like his mother."

Contrary to Matthew's words, Francesca finds herself unwelcomed by the cold Mrs. Kinsolving. She accuses Francesca of being a gold-digger, questions whether Matthew actually fathered her baby, and tells Francesca she wants nothing to do with her or the baby in the future. However, Mrs. Kinsolving's car will not start due to the light snowstorm, forcing Francesca to sleep at the home. By the morning, a blizzard has set in, stranding her at the home for a few days. She soon begins to suspect that something is amiss, due to inconsistencies in the information Matthew told her and Mrs. Kinsolving's statements. For example, Matthew never mentioned he had a sister, while Mrs. Kinsolving claims that the mentally challenged and non-verbal Kathleen is Matthew's sister. She also finds a telegraph from Matthew informing his mother of his marriage, contrary to Mrs. Kinsolving's claim he did not.

After Mrs. Kinsolving and Kathleen retire for the night, Francesca sneaks around and discovers in the family Bible that Maria died eleven days after Matthew was killed. From letters of Matthew's she finds, she deduces "Mrs. Kinsolving" is actually Maria's sister-in-law Katherine, the mother of Kathleen and Kenny; from a newspaper clipping brought by Kathleen earlier, she finds he is a serial rapist and murderer. In the morning, Francesca goes into labor, but Mrs. Kinsolving refuses to call for an ambulance. She sedates Francesca heavily and delivers the baby herself. When the baby is born, Mrs. Kinsolving announces it is dead and hands it over to Kathleen to bury. She nonchalantly tells Francesca that her baby girl was buried on the grounds.

That night, Kathleen rouses Francesca and takes her to the attic, where she finds Kathleen has hidden her baby, who is actually very much alive, in a picnic basket. Mrs. Kinsolving, correctly suspecting Francesca is sneaking around the mansion, locks her in her room. Kathleen is able to locate the key to the room and unlocks it, allowing Francesca to care for her baby. She is also able to tell Francesca that Kenny is hiding in the house; she later overhears him conversing with Mrs. Kinsolving in the basement laundry room. Kenny suspects Francesca knows about him, but is calmed by Katherine, who is focused on getting her out as soon as possible so Kenny can escape the country. After catching Francesca coming down from the attic, she realizes Francesca has gotten a key to the room, but is convinced she does not know Kenny is hiding in the house.

The next morning, Mrs. Kinsolving announces that the blizzard has cleared enough for a driver to take Francesca into town to take the bus back to Los Angeles. At breakfast, the "driver" arrives — and it is Kenny. Francesca quickly tells Mrs. Kinsolving that she left her gloves in her third-floor room and she needs to retrieve them. Instead, she gets her baby from the attic, hides the baby under her coat, and flees the mansion. Mrs. Kinsolving spots Francesca running away and sends Kenny to get her. Francesca sees Kenny is quickly gaining ground, and she darts into the carriage house in an attempt to elude him. Kenny locates her and knocks her out cold, while the baby slips from under her coat. Kenny smiles sadistically and covers the crying baby's face with his hand. Suddenly, Kathleen sneaks up behind him and stabs him in the back with a pair of scissors that Francesca was going to cut Kathleen's hair with. Mrs. Kinsolving breaks down and cradles her dead son with Kathleen and Francesca – holding her baby – looking on as help arrives.

== Cast ==
- Patty Duke as Francesca Kinsolving
- Rosemary Murphy as Katherine Kinsolving
- Richard Thomas as Kenneth "Kenny" Kinsolving
- Sian Barbara Allen as Kathleen Kinsolving
- Dennis Rucker as Red Cooper
- Harold Congdon as store clerk
- James Glazman as the breadman
- James Neumann as Joey

== Production ==
The film was shot entirely on location in early 1972 at the Glensheen Historic Estate in Duluth, Minnesota. Five years after the film's release, the Glensheen Mansion became the site of the infamous murders of mansion owner and prominent heiress Elisabeth Congdon and her nurse.

== Release ==
You'll Like My Mother opened October 13, 1972, expanding to New York on October 20, 1972.

=== Critical response ===
The film received mixed to positive reviews by critics who singled out the performers and the film's claustrophobic atmosphere. Roger Greenspun of The New York Times gave the film a middling review, writing:

You'll Like My Mother, the ads tell you, is a thriller—as if with a title like that you needed to be told—and it is a thriller of a fairly conventional, comfortably old-fashioned sort. Filmed in the dead of winter in a marvelous old mansion with cluttered firelit rooms, carved wood staircases, a secret attic hideaway, an ancient family Bible in the library, a coach house full of carriages and sleighs, it all but immerses you in castoffs from a rich and deeply rooted past that most of us can only dream of remembering. It also fails as a movie, but not dishonorably, and not without scoring some local successes along the way.

Variety, however, gave the film a positive review, which read: "You'll Like My Mother is a quietly intense thriller spotlighting excellent performances by Patty Duke and Rosemary Murphy. The film avoids explicit physical gore, instead stimulating intellectual and unseen menace." Time Out's published review of the film notes: "Johnson's direction tends to lay on the spooks a bit heavily, while the over-familiar situation (with echoes of Rosemary's Baby) is a further strait-jacket. That said, though, several risky scenes are brought off with some aplomb." TV Guide gave the film three out of five stars; in their review of the film, they called it "An intriguing, tautly directed thriller," noting: "Much of the impact in this thriller comes from the atmosphere provided, particularly that of the snowstorm. The performances and direction were also essential in overcoming a script so dependent on contrivances."

For her performance in the film, Sian Barbara Allen was nominated for a Golden Globe Award for New Star of the Year – Actress. Duke herself had won the award ten years earlier.

=== Home media ===
Scream Factory released the film on Blu-ray for the first time in May 2016. The release also featured a brief documentary with Thomas and Allen, who both cited the film as an important point in their careers. As of 2023, the Blu-ray had grossed $134,510 in domestic sales.

== See also ==
- List of American films of 1972
- List of horror films of 1972
