= Francis Stafford =

American-born Chinese photographer

Francis E. Stafford (born February 3, 1884 – 1938) moved to Shanghai in 1909 where he worked for Commercial Press for six years. Stafford is best known for his photography of the 1911 Revolution, in which the Qing dynasty was overthrown. He also took hundreds of important images of Chinese social life during the period from 1909 to 1915.

== Background ==
Francis Eugene (Frank) Stafford spent his early years in Boulder, Colorado, where his father served as City Clerk. At age 17, in 1901 Francis moved to Oakland, California where he obtained a job at the Pacific Press Publishing Association. He was united in marriage to Miss Nellie Jessen in November 1905. Their son, Clarence Stafford was born in October 1906 in Mountain View, California. While working he became an expert in photoengraving and learned photography. This helped him find a job in Shanghai, under a year's contract with the Commercial Press, to install a photoengraving plant, and teach their workman to run it, where he moved with his family in 1909. Frank Stafford was among the first Seventh-day Adventist missionaries to acquire a knowledge of the Shanghai dialect. In 1911 he became director of the Jiangsu Church Mission. Miss Frances Stafford their daughter was born in 1912. In 1915, due to health problems, he returned to the United States, living in Honolulu, HI most of his remaining life. Francis Stafford died on February 1, 1938, and was buried at Forest Lawn Memorial Park, Glendale CA.

== Shanghai photographer and lithographer ==
Stafford was commissioned by Commercial Press of Shanghai to take pictures for the books being published at that time, as many of his photos appear in books published at that time by Commercial Press. One of these books was a textbook titled Geography of China and was published in 1911, which contained about 25 of his photos. Another book, titled China's Revolution: 1911-1912 by Edwin Dingle, contains many of Stafford's photographs of soldiers fighting on both sides of the famous 1911 Wuchange Uprising in the Wuhan area of China. A Commercial Press handbook states the Francis Stafford brought color printing technology to China.

== Hawaii – lithographer ==
The Stafford family arrived in Hawaii in June 1915. Frank worked for the Paradise of the Pacific (monthly magazine) in Honolulu from 1917 thru 1922 as a photo engraver. He would transform pictures into beautiful full-color pages. Paradise of the Pacific Press was now able to produce its color pages right there in Honolulu throughout the year not only in the December Issues. The Press was also able to expand commercial color printing for businesses too. Because of the ever demanding need for more color printing, he was being pressured to work on Saturday. Saturday was his one-day not to work but to worship God. Francis was then laid off in 1922. For the next three years, Francis worked for the Honolulu Advertiser, in Honolulu as an engraver.

== Hawaii – educator ==
Francis taught Mandarin Chinese to students at McKinley High School students in 1930 and 1931.

== Discovery of photo collection ==
In the late 1990s Stafford's grandson, Professor Ronald Anderson, discovered several albums of these photographs among his Mother's belongings. The Francis Stafford collection of China contains 1,055 photos, all of which were digitized by Evan Anderson.

Most of the Francis E. Stafford Collection of photographs were taken in China around 1911. This Collection includes many historic photographs in Wuhan and Shanghai of the people and events of the 1911 Revolution. In addition, he took hundreds of photographs of the culture of China at that time. A number of the photos were close-ups of the revolutionary battles and the fall of the last dynasty. About 100 out of 1,055 photographs were taken in 1932–34, when he returned for a short time as a missionary for the Seventh-day Adventist Church. The remaining photographs were taken mostly between 1909 and 1915.

As a photographer and expert in lithography, Francis E. Stafford worked for Commercial Press in Shanghai from 1909 to 1915, during which time he was commissioned to take pictures for books and newspapers being published at that time. In October 1911, at the beginning of the Revolution, Stafford was on hand to capture rare photos of the overthrow of the Qing Dynasty.

== Publications and exhibitions ==
In 2001, the Shanghai History Museum on the 90th anniversary of the start of the Revolution, held an exhibition of the Francis Stafford photographs and published an exhibit book with over 500 of these photos.

In 2006, the Dr Sun Yat-sen Museum in Hong Kong held an exhibition of about 100 of Francis Stafford photographs at the time of the Museum opening because some rare photos of Dr. Sun Yat-sen taken by Francis Stafford. In March 2011, the Hong Kong History Museum held a 100-year celebration of the Wuchang uprising and used nearly 75 of the photographs of Francis Stafford.

In 2010, the University of Washington Press published a book by China historian Hanchao Lu entitled The Birth of a Republic: Francis Stafford’s Photographs of China’s 1911 Revolution and Beyond. This volume used over 150 of the photographs from the Collection, describing each one in its historical context. The book is intended for an academic audience.

Between 2001 and 2012, permission was given to roughly 25 film, book, magazine article, and newspaper projects to use a few of the images from the Collection. For example, the magazine History Today published an article featuring Stafford's photos and his life story on September 27, 2011.

== Transfer to Stanford's Hoover Institution in 2012 ==
Stafford's entire collection of photographs was donated in April 2012 to the Hoover Institution Library and Archives at Stanford University. The donation was made by grandson Ronald Anderson, on behalf of all the Stafford grandchildren, including Robert Stafford, Barbara Landers, Merlin G. Anderson, Rosalie M. Lynn and James S. Anderson.

The Hoover Institution Library and Archives will maintain the Francis E. Stafford collection of photographs, correspondence, and other historical materials, and will arrange for some of the images to be placed in a forthcoming campus exhibition and on their website among their China collections and managed by Lisa Nguyen, Curator of East Asia Collections.
