= Ronald Anderson =

American sociologist (1941–2020)

Ronald Eugene Anderson (June 14, 1941 – December 21, 2020), also known as Ron Anderson, was an American sociologist. He was a professor emeritus at University of Minnesota in Twin Cities where he taught sociology from 1968 to 2005. His early work focused on social and institutional factors shaping the diffusion of technology-based teaching. Since 2007, his work has focused on web-based compassion and world suffering.

== Personal life ==
Anderson was born on Flag Day, June 14, 1941 in Sikeston, Missouri. He was the second of four children born to Merlin Anderson (1911–2000) and his wife Eleanor (née Stafford; 1912–2009).

He traveled with the family to Africa. His parents' were medical missionaries in Addis Ababa, Ethiopia from 1944 to 1953.

He graduated from high school at Upper Columbia Academy in 1958; then graduated from college at La Sierra University in Riverside, CA with a BA in psychology in 1962, and from Stanford University with a PhD in sociology in 1970. In 1968, he accepted a faculty position at the University of Minnesota where he lived and worked until retirement. He died on December 21, 2020, at the age of 79.

Ron was married twice and had two children, Gina and Evan.

== Professional History and Honors ==
During most of his professional career, Anderson actively contributed in three distinct disciplines: sociology, educational research, and computer science. While his publications reside within the intersection of these fields, he has received honors or awards for outstanding service from the principal professional associations of each of these three fields: American Sociological Association, the American Educational Research Association, and the Association for Computing Machinery. In 2001, he was awarded the Outstanding Service Award by the Special Interest Group for Computers and Society of the Association for Computing Machinery. In 1990, he became an invited member of Sociological Research Association; and in 2008, he became an invited Fellow of the American Educational Research Association. In August, 2012, the Communication and Information Technology Section[4] of the American Sociological Association will honor him with the prestigious William F. Ogburn Lifetime Achievement Award

== Secondary (Re-purposed) Survey Data Analysis ==
Anderson learned secondary data analysis skills from his mentor, Stuart C. Dodd at the University of Washington in 1963, and his advisor, John W. Meyer at Stanford University. Anderson applied these skills with John O. Field to study how ideology influenced presidential elections. The resulting paper, published in the Public Opinion Quarterly, was reprinted in several major political science texts and was discussed at length by Herbert Hyman, who considered the Anderson-Field link between theoretical analysis and creative mining of secondary data resources to be exemplary and a contribution to both theory and data analysis methodology.

In 1981, Anderson received a grant from the National Science Foundation to conduct secondary analysis of the National Assessment of Educational Progress (NAEP) of science and math. One of the papers from this project was published in 1984 and was the first report on the digital divide in the United States using large-scale, national survey data. The term digital divide did not appear in the literature or the media until 11 years later.

These results, with lengthy quotes from Anderson, who directed the US portion of the study, were widely disseminated in the popular media including articles in the New York Times, the Washington Post, Business Week, the Wall Street Journal, and Ms. Magazine. In the academic literature, Anderson is reported as “explicating the depth of the digital divide in shaping the adolescent life course.” While the media focused upon the findings of sex and income gaps in access and computer course enrollments, Anderson and his associates also found major differences by race and region. Thirty years later, researchers continue to find major gaps (digital divides) in the demographics of the use of information technology In 1981, Anderson founded and served as director of the Minnesota Center for Survey Research. He served in that capacity for five years and started the Minnesota State Survey and the Twin Cities Area Survey, both of which are still conducted annually by the center, which is a unit of the University of Minnesota. During the next two decades, Anderson continued survey work but mostly cross-nationally, which is described in later sections below.

== Computing Applications in Research and Teaching ==
In the late 1960s, Anderson worked full-time as a computer programmer at the Stanford University Computation Center, now called Information Technology Services. Throughout his career as a sociologist, he also worked as a computer consultant developing applications for many educational, governmental and business organizations. Many of publications by Anderson (125 articles, 4 books authored, and 5 books edited) describe and critique the use of computers and new media in research, teaching, and learning. He also (with David Garson) has served as Co-Editor of the Sage Publishing academic journal, Social Science Computer Review, since 1987.

=== Simulation Modeling ===
Anderson pioneered the development of two major simulation models. The first provides scenario-based analysis of the impacts of changing sentencing laws. This work started in 1979 for the Minnesota Sentencing Guidelines Commission and the [Minnesota Department of Corrections] (MDOC). It consisted of a [microsimulation] model of the effects of hypothetical changes in sentencing laws upon prison and probation populations. The model, now called the Structured Sentencing Simulation, is still used by [Minnesota] and [North Carolina] in prison population projections and “what if” scenario simulations.

His second major simulation work, between 2009 and 2012, addresses college student retention. He and demographer, Martin Spielauer, developed a computer model called MicroCC. It was developed under a grant from the [National Science Foundation], and has been applied to 250,000 community college students in New England.

=== Educational Software ===
During the 1970s and 80s, Anderson pioneered educational software applications for social science teaching and research. He developed over 50 applications that were distributed by Random House, Longman Publishing, and Control Data Corporation. Some of the more popular titles include Social Indicators Game, The Public Opinion Exercise: American Sexual Values and Social Power Game. The latter game received the NCRIPTAL/EDUCOM Higher Education Distinguished Software Award in 1987.

=== Lectures on New Media in Education ===
Principally during the 1980s and 1990s, Anderson gave invited lectures on using new media, which includes educational technology and instructional technology, to teachers and administrators in both secondary and postsecondary institutions as well as national educational organizations. The latter included the Ministry of Education (Singapore), Japan's National Institute for Educational Policy Research, and the Ministry of Education and Research (Norway). Within the United States, his lectures included the National Academy of Sciences, Eastern Montana College, University of Akron, University of Dayton, Ball State University, and Eastern Michigan University.

== Social Implications of Technology ==
During the 1970s, Anderson published a number of articles on the ways in which the social context of computing shaped its use and development. In his writing on the social aspects and implications of computing, he persistently emphasized the need for research data for making decisions about the implementation of computer technology. The ACM Digital Library contains 33 articles by Anderson with a total of 982 citations and 617 downloads in 2012 alone.

With funding from the National Science Foundation to the Minnesota Educational Computing Consortium, Ron Anderson and Dan Klassen conducted the first large-scale survey, which surveyed the nearly 7,000 Minnesota high school teachers of math and science regarding their use of computers in teaching.[29] They found that in 1978, before the release of the PC, half of the teachers used computers in their classes and the social context and social attributes of the teachers determined computer utilization.

In 1982, then U.S. Congressman Al Gore invited Anderson to participate in the “Computers and Education Hearings” of the Subcommittee on Investigations and Oversight of the House Science and Technology Committee in Washington, D.C., on September 29, 1983. The full Statement of Ronald E. Anderson before the Subcommittee can be downloaded from the ACM Digital Library. The statement emphasized differences in the implementation of computer utilization in schools based upon social and demographic factors, and the need for local and national evidence-based accountability.

In 1980, Anderson became the founding Chair of the Section of the American Sociological Association that is now called “Communication and Information Technologies” (CITASA) Barry Wellman describes Anderson's organizing role as a stalwart of the technology movement within sociology.

In 1992, Anderson under the auspices of the ACM organized a conference on “Computers and the Quality of Life,” the first conference to link IT with quality of life issues. The Conference Proceedings is still downloadable at the ACM Digital Library and was downloaded 414 times in 2012.

In 2000, the Association for Computing Machinery Council appointed Anderson to represent ACM and the United States on the 30-nation Technical Committee (TC9) on “Relationship between Computers and Society” of the International Federation of Information Processing Societies (IFIPS). He served in that capacity for five years. The principal products of this international Committee during that time was to hold two symposia and collectively author a book entitled Perspectives and Policies on ICT in Society, which was published by Springer in 2007.

=== Code of Ethics for the Computing Professions ===
During the 1980s, Anderson held several leadership positions in the [Association for Computing Machinery] (ACM), the principle association of computer scientists and computing professionals. He served as a Council member as well as Chair of the Special Interest Group on Computers and Society (SIGCAS) [His most important achievement within ACM was to chair the Working Group that developed the new ACM Code of Ethics and Professional Conduct. It was officially published in 1992 and remains the official ACM Code of Ethics. The ACM Digital Library Guide lists 2,393 citations of the ACM Code of Ethics and Professional Conduct in the literature since 1992.

Following the publication of the new ACM Code of Ethics, Anderson wrote and published several articles on the ethics of computer work including an article on ethics for digital government. Pavlichev and Garson described his work as embodying the moral imperatives that are needed in the age of e-Government.

== Social Dynamics of Technology in Teaching and Learning ==
In 1992, coordinated by the International Association for the Evaluation of Educational Achievement (IEA), nearly 20 countries simultaneously surveyed (1) schools about the installed base of technology for K-12 instruction, (2) teacher practices for integrating technology into their teaching, and (3) students skills in using computers. Anderson directed the United States portion of the study.

Not only was this the first international assessment of ICT in school-based learning, but it was the first such study in the United States. The key findings were that school computers were more outdated in the USA than in most other countries in the study and the diffusion of computer augmented learning tended to be less prevalent in lower income school districts and in highly rural areas. These results, with lengthy quotes from Anderson, who directed the US portion of the study, were widely disseminated in the popular media including articles in USA Today, and Education Week. and many others.

Six years later in 1998, Ron Anderson (with Henry J. Becker) conducted another national survey of schools and teachers: Teaching, Learning and Computing. The project produced 16 reports that were widely circulated. The principal findings of the study were that teacher professional identities, constructivist pedagogy, and instructionally oriented technology support were key factors in effective use of computers in teaching.

=== Second International Technology in Education Study (SITES) ===
Beginning in 1997, Anderson Co-Chaired the International Steering Committee for the first two modules of the IEA's Second International Technology in Education Study (SITES). Anderson continued with the SITES 2006 Study until 2007 when it ended.

In 2000, Anderson and Sara Dexter directed a large national study funded by the U.S. Department of Education, "Exemplary Technology-Supported-Schooling Case Studies," a project providing for the United States participation in both the IEA SITES Module 2 and the OECD (Organisation for Economic Co-operation and Development) "case studies of reform and innovation using information technology in learning." The results of this large study of innovative exemplars of teaching with technology for the United States can be found online.

=== Contribution to Theories on the Social Dynamics of Technology ===
Anderson contributed to theories on the sociology of educational technology, especially in the areas of Diffusion of Innovations and application of Information Society concepts. In 1976, he published results about the diffusion of computer utilization among sociologists and in 1979 about secondary mathematics and science teachers. The former study found that while the time of adoption of computers in teaching followed an S-shaped curve as predicted by diffusion theory, the majority of applications used were not particularly innovative. In the latter study, he found that technology resources and social factors were about equally powerful in explaining adoption of technology in teaching. More interesting, however, in terms of theory was the finding that a substantial number of teachers had discontinued their use of the innovation, an aspect of the theory not yet developed.

A second area of theoretical contribution was that of theories of the information society, of which the concept of “knowledge society” is an extension. While Anderson began in the 1990s, applying information economy and knowledge management concepts to theories of what students would need in the 21st Century, his most extensive analysis was published in 2008. Anderson introduced the concepts of tacit knowledge and tacit knowledge demand to pedagogical reform with technology. His original notions of the information society paradigm are generally accepted among those concerned with defining 21st Century Skills. The acceptance of the concept of Technological Pedagogical Content Knowledge (TPACK) is a case in point.

== Evaluation Research ==
Anderson frequently received consulting requests to evaluate educational interventions and conduct [educational research], especially with regard to the role of [information technology] in teaching. Numerous clients include: [Control Data Corporation], [Xerox Corporation], the [United States Department of Education], and the Research Grants Council, Hong Kong. For example, he reviewed test items and research designs for the Australian Center for Educational Research helping them administer the OECD Programme for International Student Assessment (PISA) project. In 2004 he spent two weeks working with the [Institute for the Promotion of Teaching Science and Technology] in [Bangkok], Thailand reviewing their IT-related projects and research needs. He also has worked with several SRI International projects, funded by the [National Science Foundation] to develop performance assessments and surveys related ion the use of Information and communication technologies in education by both teachers and students.

== Expert Witness ==
On several occasions, Anderson was asked to serve as an expert witness on issues related to survey research. From 2003 to 2005, he served as an expert witness for Mahoney & Foster, Ltd on an advertising fraud case. His role included the conduct a survey of consumers of deer hunting products and critiquing the research quality of other surveys conducted.

Anderson also served as an expert witness on several Change of venue hearings. One was the trial of Marjorie Congdon Caldwell Hagen for the 1977 murder of Elisabeth Congdon and her nurse in her Glensheen Historic Estate. Another change of venue hearing in which he testified was a murder trial in which William Kunstler was involved. The hearing occurred on the Pine Ridge Indian Reservation in 1978.

== Major books on computing and education ==
The WorldCat Identities three of Anderson's books as held by over 400 WorldCat member libraries worldwide. The three books are: Computer Literacy, Academic Press, 1982; Computer Applications in the Social Sciences, (with Edward Brent) NY: McGraw-Hill, Inc., 1990; with T. Plomp, N. Law, & A. Quale) Cross-National Policies and Practices on Information and Communication Technology in Education. Greenwich, Connecticut, US: Information Age Publishing, 2009, which was reviewed by Bhasin.

In addition, Anderson (with David Sullivan) authored the college textbook World of Computing (Boston, MA: Houghton Mifflin, 1988), which was adopted by an estimated 660 college classrooms. Among his other authored books were: ICT and the Emerging Paradigm for Life Long Learning: A Worldwide Educational Assessment of Infrastructure, Goals and Practices, (with W. Pelgrum), which was published by the International Association for the Evaluation of Educational Achievement in 2001 and is available at: and Assessing Com¬puter Literacy, Minnesota Educational Computing Consortium, St. Paul, Minnesota, 1982. Coiro, Knobel, Lankshear & Leu note that this original work on measuring computing from the standpoint of literacy was a ground-breaking direction in educational research.

== Recent Research ==
Beginning in about 2007, Anderson decided he could contribute to the common good by addressing larger societal issues rather than technology alone. He established the nonprofit Foundation for the Relief of Suffering, Inc. to develop and promoted the website WorldSuffering.org, and proceeded to write numerous articles and books on Suffering. Between 2014 and 2017 Springer published three of his books, all on suffering. The first was Human Suffering and Quality of Life - Conceptualizing Stories and Statistics. The second was World Suffering and the Quality of Life in 2015. The third was Alleviation of World Suffering in 2017. The last two were anthologies including chapters written by over 25 authors in each volume.
