= Glensheen Historic Estate =

Historic house in Minnesota, United States

- Chester and Clara Congdon Estate
- U.S. National Register of Historic Places
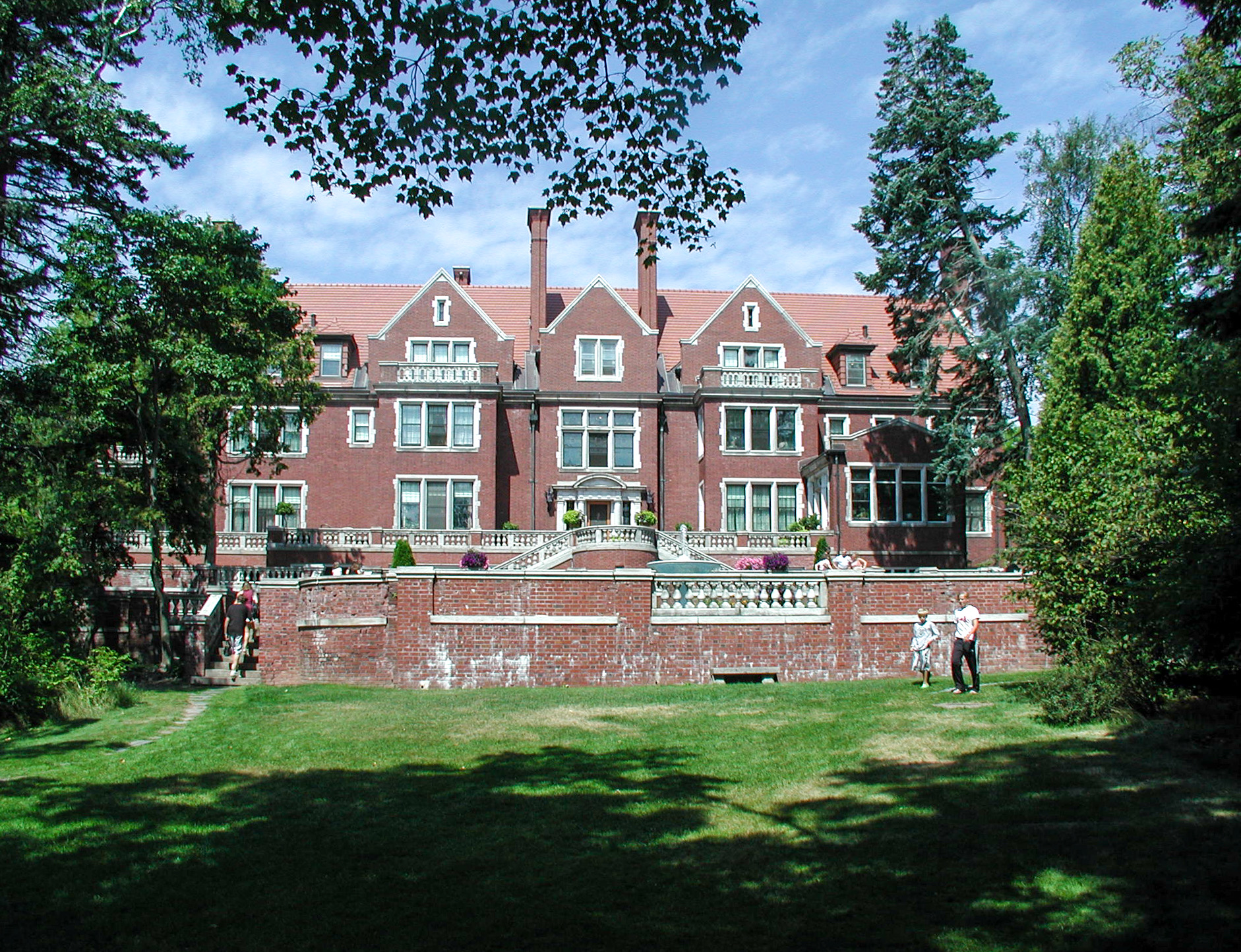
- Lake side view of Glensheen

- Location within Minnesota Location within the United States
- Interactive map showing Glensheen Historic Estate’s location
- Location: 3300 London Rd. Duluth, Minnesota
- Coordinates: 46°48′54″N 92°3′6″W
- Built: 1905–08
- Architect: Clarence H. Johnston, Sr.; Charles W. Leavitt, Jr.
- Architectural style: Jacobean Revival
- Website: https://glensheen.org/
- NRHP reference No.: 91001057
- Added to NRHP: August 15, 1991

Glensheen, the Historic Congdon Estate is a 20,000 square foot mansion in Duluth, Minnesota, United States, operated by the University of Minnesota Duluth as a historic house museum. Glensheen sits on 12 acres of waterfront property on Lake Superior, has 39 rooms and is built in the Jacobean architectural tradition, inspired by the Beaux-Arts styles of the era. The mansion was constructed as the family home of Chester Adgate Congdon. The building was designed by Minnesota architect Clarence H. Johnston Sr., with interiors designed by William A. French Co. and the formal terraced garden and English style landscape designed by the Charles Wellford Leavitt firm out of New York. Construction began in 1905 and was completed in 1908. The home cost a total of $854,000, equivalent to more than $22 million in 2017. The home is a crowning example of design and craftmanship of the Midwestern United States in the early 20th century.

== Description ==
=== Exterior ===
The building's central entrance is flanked by battered Tuscan columns along with recessed leaded art glass sidelights and pilasters. It features a gable roof framed with steel beams covered by Ludowici clay roof tiles.

Almost the entire length of the south elevation on the ground level is surrounded by the winter garden, also known as the "subway." The structure is considered an excellent example of the Jacobethan revival style of architecture.

=== Interior ===
William French's interior exhibits Late Victorian, Arts and Crafts, Federal Style, and Art Nouveau styles. French also designed the furniture for the house to coordinate with the style in each room. The rooms are trimmed or paneled in Circassian walnut, mahogany, cypress, fumed oak, enameled birch, and American walnut, with the furniture in each room made of the same wood used in the woodwork. The original furniture brought into the house in 1908 and '09 remains in virtually the same place it has been for 110 years. Some of the wall coverings and upholstery are also original. The hallways exhibit original stenciling in the Arts and Crafts style as well as wood carving. Wall and ceiling coverings are made of wool, silk, filled burlap, and gold leaf.

The doors throughout the home are made of two kinds of wood, with oak on the hallway side and the variety of wood used in the room on the other side. The furniture in the eldest son's room, for example, is decorated with ebony inlaid motifs that are repeated in the oak paneled walls.

Chester Congdon's art collection hangs in the home as it did when the Congdons lived there. The collection includes works by American artists Charles Warren Eaton, Henry Farrer, Childe Hassam, Albert Lorey Groll, Hamilton King, Lawrence Mazzanovich, Henry Ward Ranger, Peter Alfred Gross, David Ericson, C. F. Daubigny, Henri Harpignies, and many more. The house also contains a silk embroidery depicting the Yōrō Falls by Yōzō Nagara. In addition to the main mansion, the estate has its own Carriage House, Gardener's Cottage, and Boathouse on Lake Superior.

== History ==
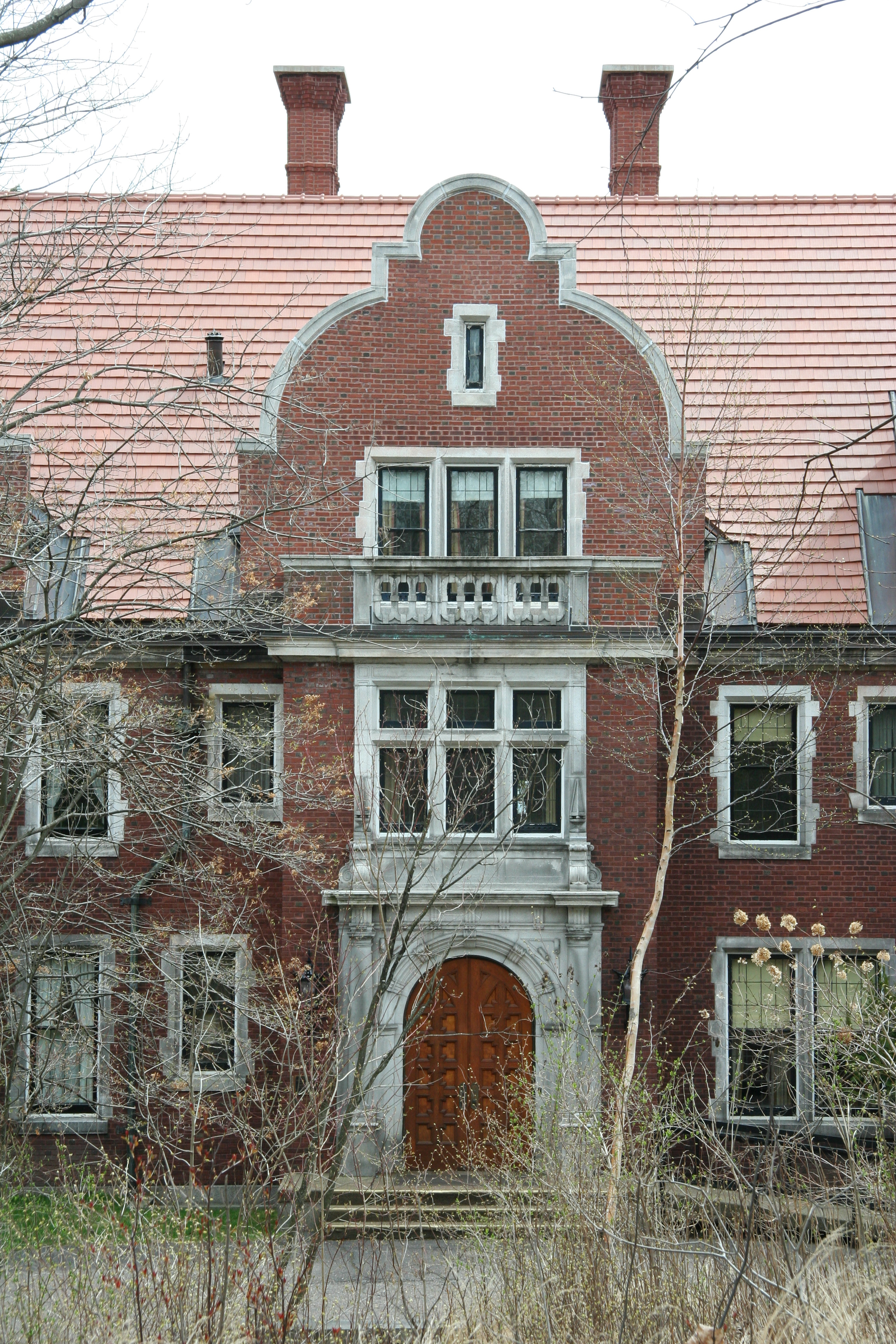
Glensheen, seen through the fence along Highway 61

In 1968 the estate was given to the University of Minnesota Duluth to own and operate. At the time, Elisabeth Congdon (Chester Congdon's youngest daughter) was given a life estate, allowing her to occupy Glensheen until her death.

Roger Caldwell, the second husband of Elisabeth Congdon's adopted daughter, Marjorie Congdon LeRoy Caldwell Hagen, was convicted of two counts of first-degree murder and received two life sentences for the murders of Elisabeth Congdon and her nurse, Velma Pietila, on June 27, 1977. Marjorie was charged with aiding and abetting and conspiracy to commit murder but was acquitted on all charges. In 1982 Caldwell's conviction was overturned by the Minnesota Supreme Court. He was set to be retried but pleaded guilty and submitted a full confession. He was later released from prison, and in 1988 he committed suicide. In the intervening years, Marjorie Congdon Caldwell Hagen was twice convicted of arson, for which she served 12 years in prison, and was once wanted for bigamy in North Dakota.

In 1979, two years after Congdon's murder, the mansion opened to the public. For years, the third floor and attic were closed to the public due to safety concerns over limited access, but both areas were opened to small group tours in 1992. The estate is listed on the National Register of Historic Places.

== In popular culture ==
The movie You'll Like My Mother was filmed at the Glensheen mansion. The film starred Patty Duke and Richard Thomas, released on October 13, 1972.

The American/Australian documentary television series Behind Mansion Walls, on Investigation Discovery, dedicated half of episode seven, in its debut season, to the murders of Elisabeth Congdon and her nurse.

The American television show Mansions and Murders featured the story of the murders of Elisabeth Congdon and her nurse Velma Pietila. The show also spoke of some of the crimes that Elisabeth's adopted daughter Marjorie committed, such as arson and forgery as well as her acquittal of the murders. The title of the episode is "Goodnight Nurse". It is the 3rd episode of the 1st season and aired on May 6, 2015.

In 2015, a musical based on the murders titled Glensheen was created by Jeffrey Hatcher and Chan Poling.

The film Girl Missing, starring Francesca Eastwood, was partially filmed at Glensheen, featuring the grounds, the shore of Lake Superior, and the exterior of the house.
