= Sian Barbara Allen =

American television actress (1946–2025)

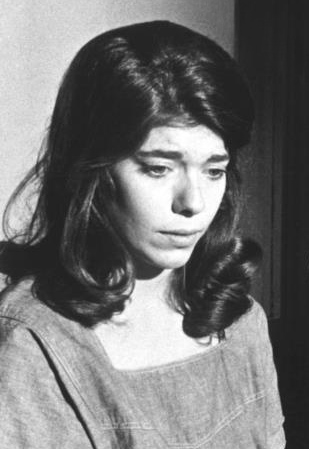
- Allen in The Bold Ones: The Lawyers in 1972
- Born: July 12, 1946; Reading, Pennsylvania, U.S.
- Died: March 31, 2025 (aged 78); Chapel Hill, North Carolina, U.S.
- Education: Reading Senior High School; Pasadena Playhouse
- Occupations: Actress; writer
- Years active: 1964–1990
- Notable work: You'll Like My Mother; The Waltons; Scream, Pretty Peggy; The Lindbergh Kidnapping Case
- Spouse: Peter Burr Gelblum (m. 1979; div. 2001)
- Children: 1

Sian Barbara Allen (July 12, 1946 – March 31, 2025) was an American actress who mainly appeared on television throughout the 1970s. A native of Reading, Pennsylvania, Allen studied at the Pasadena Playhouse before appearing in her first screen role on the series O'Hara, U.S. Treasury in 1971. She went on to appear in numerous television series in the ensuing years, including recurring appearances on The Waltons, Gunsmoke, and Ironside.

She starred in several television films, including Scream, Pretty Peggy (1973) and The Lindbergh Kidnapping Case (1976). In addition to her television credits, Allen starred in two feature films: the thriller You'll Like My Mother (1972) and the Western Billy Two Hats (1974). For her performance in You'll Like My Mother, Allen was nominated for a Golden Globe Award for New Star of the Year.

== Early life and education ==
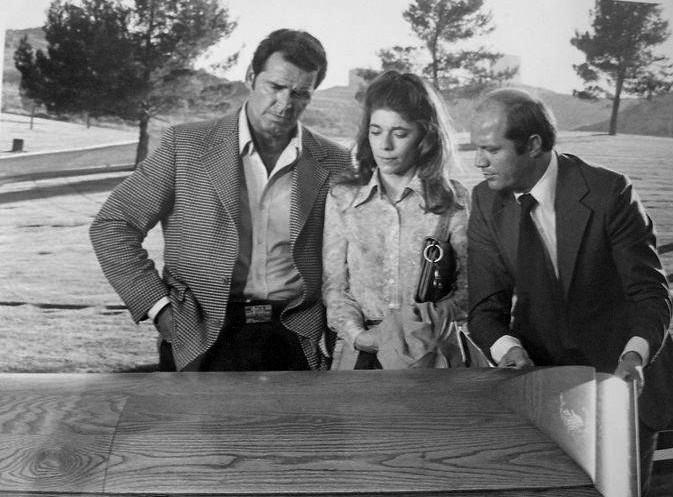
With James Garner and David Morick in the 1974 The Rockford Files episode "Tall Woman in Red Wagon"

Allen was born on July 12, 1946. She studied at the Pasadena Playhouse in Pasadena, California, between 1964 and 1965.

== Career ==
Allen appeared in the horror film You'll Like My Mother (1972), starring Patty Duke, Rosemary Murphy and Richard Thomas. For this role, Allen was nominated for the 1973 Golden Globe Award as Most Promising New Actress.

She later appeared in two episodes of the popular TV series The Waltons (1973) as Jenny Pendleton, an early love interest of John-Boy Walton (reuniting her with Thomas, who played John-Boy and with whom she had appeared in You'll Like My Mother the previous year). Allen and Thomas were themselves described as "together these days", and Thomas wanted Allen to play the Pendleton role. She played the title role of a mansion's housekeeper in the 1973 ABC Movie of the Week, Scream, Pretty Peggy, which starred Bette Davis.

Allen appeared on television series and miniseries such as Captains and the Kings; The Incredible Hulk; Ironside; The Rockford Files; Alias Smith and Jones; Bonanza; Kojak; Gunsmoke; Love, American Style; Columbo: Lovely but Lethal; Cagney & Lacey; Adam-12; and Hawaii Five-O.

In 1974, she was the lead actress in the western Billy Two Hats, alongside Gregory Peck and Jack Warden. In 1976, she portrayed Anne Morrow Lindbergh in the television movie The Lindbergh Kidnapping Case, based on the real-life Lindbergh baby kidnapping and murder.

A consistently busy actress through the 1970s, after giving birth to her daughter in 1982, Allen focused on family life and was only seen in a total of four acting appearances between 1980 and 1990. Allen's last role was in an episode of L.A. Law in 1990, after which she retired from acting.

Always interested in writing, Allen wrote a single episode of Baretta in 1978 (her only writing credit for film or television). From the 1980s onward, and especially after retiring from acting, Allen concentrated on writing and publishing poetry and short fiction.

== Personal life and death ==
Allen married Peter Burr Gelblum in 1979; they had a daughter, Emily. The marriage ended in 2001. She had two sisters, Mrs. Hannah Davie and flash fiction author, editor and teacher Meg Pokrass.

Allen died from Alzheimer's disease in Chapel Hill, North Carolina, on March 31, 2025, at the age of 78.

== Filmography ==
Year	Title	Role	Notes	Ref.
1971	O'Hara, U.S. Treasury	Sheridan Lee	Episode: "Operation: Time Fuse"	
1971	Alias Smith and Jones	Sister Grace	Episode: "Six Strangers at Apache Springs"	
1971	Gunsmoke	Allie Dawson	3 episodes	
1972	The Scarecrow	Amelia Reddington	Television film	
1972	The Bold Ones: The Lawyers	Lauren Hazelwood	Episode: "In Sudden Darkness"	
1972	Owen Marshall, Counselor at Law	Meredith Carson	Episode: "Shine a Light on Me"	
1972	The F.B.I.	Bridy Nolan	Episode: "The Set-Up"	
1972	The Family Rico	Nora	Television film	
1972	You'll Like My Mother	Kathleen	Nominated – Golden Globe Award for New Star of the Year – Actress	
1972	Bonanza	Teresa Burnside	Episode: "Ambush at Rio Lobo"	
1973	Love, American Style	Jane	Segment: "Love and the Happy Family"	
1973	Columbo	Shirley Blaine	Episode: "Lovely but Lethal"	
1973	The Waltons	Jenny Pendleton	Episodes: "The Love Story", "The Thanksgiving Story"	
1973	Scream, Pretty Peggy	Peggy Johnson	Television film	
1974	Billy Two Hats	Esther Spencer		
1974	Kojak	Lyndsey Walker	Episode: "Down a Long and Lonely River"	
1971–1974	Marcus Welby, M.D.	Various	3 episodes	
1972–1974	Ironside	Susan Todd / Jane Spencer	3 episodes	
1974	The Rockford Files	Sandra Turkel	Episode: "Tall Woman in Red Wagon"	
1974	Lucas Tanner	Donna	Episode: "A Question of Privacy"	
1974	Adam-12	Sparky	Episode: "Something Worth Dying For: Part 1"	
1975	Eric	Marilyn Porter	Television film	
1976	The Lindbergh Kidnapping Case	Anne Morrow Lindbergh	Television film	
1976	Police Story	Dana Vernon	Episode: "The Other Side of the Badge"	
1976	Captains and the Kings	Cara Leslie	Miniseries	
1976	Smash-Up on Interstate 5	Barbara Hutton	Television film	
1977	Kingston: Confidential	Cynthia Marlowe	Episode: "The Cult"	
1977	Hawaii Five-O	Kati Parisa	Episode: "East Wind − Ill Wind"	
1978	Baretta	Ellen	Episode: "The Appointment"	
1978	W.E.B.	Angelica Hutton	Episode: "To Angelica with Love"	
1978	Sword of Justice	Emily Lang	Episode: "Aloha, Julie Lang"	
1979	The Incredible Hulk	Kathy Allen	Episode: "The Quiet Room"	
1981	Darkroom	Brenda	Episode: "Make-Up"	
1984	Falcon Crest	Mrs. Perkins − Adoption Agency Clerk (uncredited)	Episode: "Lord of the Valley"	
1988	Cagney & Lacey	Rhoda Duggan	Episode: "A Fair Shake: Part 2"	
1990	L.A. Law	Diane Campbell	Episode: "Whatever Happened to Hannah?"	

== Awards and nominations ==
Year	Association	Category	Nominated work	Result
1973	Golden Globe Award	Golden Globe Award for New Star of the Year – Actress	You'll Like My Mother	Nominated
