= Naomi A. Hintze =

American writer

Naomi Agans Hintze (July 8, 1909 – November 16, 1997) was an American writer of mystery, supernatural and gothic suspense novels for adults.

== Early life ==
Hintze was born in Camden, Illinois, the daughter of Jesse Estes Agans and Estella Rang. She studied at Maryville College from 1927 to 1929, and at Ball State Teachers College from 1929 to 1930. On April 19, 1930, she married Harold Sanborn Hintze, with whom she had three children. Naomi was fascinated with psychic phenomena, a recurring theme in her books. She and her husband settled in Charlottesville, Virginia, where the nearby University of Virginia was the only American university with a Division of Parapsychology. Naomi was a member of the American Society of Psychical Research. She died on November 16, 1997.

== Career ==
In 1970, she was nominated for the Best First Novel Edgar Award for You'll Like My Mother published by Putnam in 1969. The book was adapted into the 1972 film of the same name, directed by Lamont Johnson and starring Patty Duke, Rosemary Murphy and Richard Thomas. (The book was published in the United Kingdom in 1970 under the title The House With the Watching Eyes). Her third novel, Aloha Means Goodbye published by Random House in 1972, was made into a TV movie in 1974. (It was published in the United Kingdom as Hawaii for Danger.)

In addition to publishing seven novels, Hintze was the author or co-author of three non-fiction books, including her first published volume, Buried Treasure Waits for You (1962). She published several short stories in magazines like Ladies Home Journal and Redbook.

== Bibliography ==
=== Novels ===
- You'll Like My Mother, Putnam (1969)
- The Stone Carnation, Random House (1971)
- Aloha Means Goodbye, Random House (1973)
- Listen, Please Listen, Random House (1974)
- Cry Witch, Random House (1975)
- Ghost Child, Fawcett (1983)
- Dream of Falling, Fawcett (1983)

=== Nonfiction works ===
- Buried Treasure Waits for You, Bobbs-Merrill (1962)
- The Psychic Realm: What Can You Believe?, with Joseph Gaither Pratt, Random House (1975)
- Time Bomb with Peter van der Linde, Doubleday (1978)

=== Short stories ===
- Better in Memory, Good Housekeeping (February 1946)
- The Girl Who Had No Pride, Woman's Journal (September 1946)
- That Very Young Looking Mrs. Tell, Woman's Home Companion Magazine (June 1948)
- The Sunday Smell, Ladies Home Journal (July 1954)
- Mrs. Dunbar Dyes Her Hair, Woman's Day (November 1956)
- Not Because You Are Good, Redbook Magazine (April 1964)
- Four Is a Lovely Number ..., Redbook Magazine (May 1964)
- The Wife, Chatelaine (October 1965)
