= The Lindbergh Kidnapping Case =

- Genre: Crime; Drama
- Written by: JP Miller
- Directed by: Buzz Kulik
- Starring: Cliff DeYoung; Anthony Hopkins; Martin Balsam; Joseph Cotten; Sian Barbara Allen; Walter Pidgeon
- Music by: Billy Goldenberg
- Country of origin: United States
- Original language: English

Production
- Executive producer: David Gerber
- Producers: Leonard Horn; Buzz Kulik
- Production location: Colusa, California
- Cinematography: Charles F. Wheeler
- Editor: Rita Roland
- Running time: 148 minutes
- Production company: Columbia Pictures Television

Original release
- Network: NBC
- Release: February 26, 1976

The Lindbergh Kidnapping Case is a 1976 American television film dramatization of the Lindbergh kidnapping, directed by Buzz Kulik and starring Cliff DeYoung, Anthony Hopkins, Martin Balsam, Joseph Cotten, Sian Barbara Allen, and Walter Pidgeon. It first aired on the NBC network on February 26, 1976.

== Plot ==
The film opens with archive footage of Charles Lindbergh's pioneering 1927 transatlantic flight in the Spirit of St. Louis and the song “Lindbergh (The Eagle of the U.S.A.)”.

Hopewell, New Jersey, March 1, 1932. After preparing a bath, Anne Morrow Lindbergh (Sian Barbara Allen) is alerted by her nurse, Betty Gow, that her baby is not in its crib. They check with Charles Lindbergh (Cliff DeYoung), reading in his study, that the baby is not with him then immediately go to the nursery and discover an envelope near the window. Lindbergh orders Betty to ask their butler to call the police. Lindbergh informs his wife not to interfere with anything in the nursery and that their baby has been stolen.

The police investigate the Lindbergh home and establish a command post in the garage. A ladder is found outside the nursery window along with a nearby footprint. Inside the house, the envelope is opened and Lindbergh reads a letter indicating his child is in good care and future communications with have a distinctive signature with three holes in the paper.

The press quickly descend on the house and the police are angered when a reporter attempts to gain a statement from Lindbergh.

In New York City, the police department consider the possibilities that the child was kidnapped by organised criminals. They are advised by a criminal profiler that the kidnapper is likely to be acting on their own as they only asked for $50,000, and an individual who is jealous of Lindbergh's status.

In New York City, concerned citizen Dr John Condon (Joseph Cotten) decides to write to the Bronx Home News newspaper to offer himself as an intermediary in the ransom exchange. Condon receives a reply from the kidnapper and telephones Lindbergh, giving him confirmation that the letter has the unique signature with three holes in the paper with a demand for $70,000.

Condon later telephones Lindbergh to inform him that he has received a package with the sleeping garment of the child. Lindbergh dons a disguise and is able to drive away from his home without attracting the attention of the massed press. Lindbergh identifies the garment and also retrieves instructions for the rendezvous to pay the ransom.

The Bronx, April 2, 1932. Condon and Lindbergh drive to a cemetery to hand over the ransom. Lindbergh stays in the car while Condon meets the kidnapper. The kidnapper speaks with a German accent and tells Condon that his name is John. Condon hands over the ransom but is told that further instructions will be given on where to retrieve the child. Despite a search by air for a boat indicated in the instructions, they are unable to find the child.

The following month, the body of the child is found just two miles from the Lindbergh home. Lindbergh identifies the body at that of his missing child.

By November 1933, New York City detectives are tracing Gold Certificates, contained in the ransom money, that are now entering circulation.

On September 15, 1934, a breakthrough is made when a gas station attendant receives a gold certificate from a customer. The attendant had been notified to watch out for ransom banknotes and wrote the car licence plate on a gold certificate he received. Under questioning, he describes the customer as having a German accent. The car was a brown Plymouth Sedan and is identified as belonging to Bruno Hauptmann (Anthony Hopkins), resident in the Bronx.

The detectives stake out Hauptmann's home and identify his car. After following Hauptmann, they decide to stop him quickly and find ransom money on his person. At his home, Hauptmann protests his innocence. Stripping his garage, the police find $14,000 ransom money hidden inside with matching serial numbers. Hauptmann is arrested.

On January 2, 1935, the trial of Hauptmann begins in Flemington, New Jersey. Evidence is presented to connect Hauptmann to the ransom letters and ladder, the wood of which came from his attic.

At the conclusion of the trial, Hauptmann is permitted to see his wife and his own child. Outside the courthouse, an angry mob are calling for the death penalty. Hauptmann remarks on his innocence and that the jury has deliberated for eleven hours, and that this is a good sign.

Returning for the verdict, Hauptmann is found guilty. Cheering erupts in the courtroom and the mob applaud outside. Hauptmann is sentenced to death and later electrocuted on April 3, 1936, after being informed all appeals have failed.

The Lindberghs decide to leave the country and move to England, where they are informed of Hauptmann's execution.

== Cast ==
- Cliff DeYoung as Charles Lindbergh
- Anthony Hopkins as Bruno Hauptmann
- Denise Alexander as Violet Sharpe
- Sian Barbara Allen as Anne Morrow Lindbergh
- Martin Balsam as Edward J. Reilly
- Joseph Cotten as Dr. John F. Condon
- Peter Donat as Col. H. Norman Schwarzkopf
- John Fink as Mr. Anderson
- Dean Jagger as Koehler
- Laurence Luckinbill as Gov. Hal Hoffman
- Frank Marth as Chief Harry Wolfe
- Walter Pidgeon as Judge Trenchard
- Tony Roberts as Lt. Jim Finn
- Robert Sampson as John Curtis
- David Spielberg as David Wilentz
- Joseph Stern as Dr. Schonfeld
- Kate Woodville as Betty Gow
- Keenan Wynn as Fred Huisache
- Alan Beckwith as Walter Lyle

== Reception ==
=== Awards and nominations ===
The production was nominated for a Golden Globe for Best Motion Picture Made for TV. Anthony Hopkins won a Primetime Emmy Award for Outstanding Lead Actor in a Miniseries or a Movie.
