= Social Science Computer Review =

- Discipline: Social science
- Language: English
- Edited by: Deana A. Rohlinger

Publication details
- History: 1983-present
- Publisher: SAGE Publications on behalf of the Social Science Computing Association
- Frequency: Quarterly
- Impact factor: 4.1 (2017)

Standard abbreviations
- ISO 4: Soc. Sci. Comput. Rev.

Indexing
- ISSN: 0894-4393 (print); 1552-8286 (web)
- LCCN: 88649155
- OCLC no.: 470334995

Links
- Journal homepage; Online access; Online archive

Social Science Computer Review is a peer-reviewed academic journal that covers the use of computers in the field of social science, including artificial intelligence, computer simulation, and electronic modelling. The founding editors-in-chief were G. Garson (North Carolina State University) and Ronald Anderson (University of Minnesota). The current editor-in-chief (from 2024) is Deana A. Rohlinger (Florida State University). It was established in 1983 and is published by SAGE Publications in association with the Social Science Computing Association.

== Abstracting and indexing ==
The journal is abstracted and indexed in Scopus and the Social Sciences Citation Index. According to the Journal Citation Reports, its 2017 impact factor is 3.253, ranking it 20th out of 105 journals in the category "Computer Science, Interdisciplinary Applications", 2nd out of 98 journals in the category "Social Sciences, Interdisciplinary", and 14th out of 88 journals in the category "Information Science & Library Science".
