= Scream, Pretty Peggy =

American television movie

- Genre: Drama; horror
- Written by: Jimmy Sangster; Arthur Hoffe
- Directed by: Gordon Hessler
- Starring: Bette Davis; Ted Bessell; Sian Barbara Allen
- Music by: Bob Prince
- Country of origin: United States
- Original language: English

Production
- Producer: Lou Morheim
- Cinematography: Leonard J. South
- Editor: Larry Strong
- Running time: 74 minutes
- Production company: Universal Television

Original release
- Network: ABC
- Release: November 24, 1973

Scream, Pretty Peggy is a 1973 American made-for-television horror film directed by Gordon Hessler and starring Bette Davis, Ted Bessell, and Sian Barbara Allen. Its plot follows young college student Peggy Johns who is given a job by Jeffrey Thornton, a sculptor-housekeeper at a mysterious mansion where his sister Jennifer and their elderly mother reside. It was broadcast as the ABC Suspense Movie on November 24, 1973.

The film was shot on location at the old Noah Dietrich estate above the Sunset Strip in Hollywood.

== Plot ==
Agnes Thornton, a housekeeper for the reclusive Mrs. Elliott and her sculptor son, Jeffrey, is stabbed to death at the Elliotts' mansion. Her father, George, files a missing person report on his daughter after she fails to contact him, unaware she is dead.

Meanwhile, college student and aspiring artist Peggy Johns visits the Elliott mansion after finding a job advertisement on campus. Jeffrey hires Peggy for the job, though his mother is ambivalent, and suggests several times to Peggy that she quit. In the house, Peggy notices a picture of a young blonde woman, whom she later learns is Jeffrey's sister, Jennifer. When Peggy inquires about her, Mrs. Elliott claims Jennifer is living abroad in Europe.

Peggy grows somewhat suspicious when George arrives at the mansion searching for Agnes. Unbeknownst to Peggy, George is murdered by an unseen assailant while attempting to leave, and she later notices his car in the garage. As Peggy and Jeffrey begin to form an artistic—and later, romantic—bond, Peggy learns that Jennifer is not actually in Europe. Jeffrey reveals that Jennifer is psychotic, and lives in a secret apartment located above the home's garage, where she is cared for by him and his mother. The empathetic Peggy wishes to meet Jennifer, but Jeffrey forbids it.

Later, Peggy informs Mrs. Elliott that she knows the truth about Jennifer, and that she wants to befriend her, to which Mrs. Elliott responds with laughter. Mrs. Elliott again urges Peggy to quit the job, and the two get into an argument, ending in Mrs. Elliott firing her. Later that night, Peggy goes to meet Jeffrey in his artist's loft, and is met by a blonde woman in a flowing white gown, whom she believes to be Jennifer. Jennifer attempts to stab Peggy to death before chasing her through the house.

Peggy eventually finds Jeffrey, who consoles her. When Peggy asks about George's car, Jeffrey tells her he hid it in the garage to protect Jennifer, whom he believes may have hurt him. Jeffrey visits Jennifer's apartment while Peggy and Mrs. Elliot watch from the driveway. After an audible scuffle, Jeffrey emerges from the apartment, covered in blood, rambling about how Jennifer fell onto a knife and was killed during the confrontation. Peggy attempts to phone police, but Mrs. Elliott cautions her against doing so. When Peggy subsequently enters Jennifer's apartment, she finds it empty.

In the artist's loft, Peggy finds Jeffrey in a dissociated state, wearing a gown and makeup, holding a blond wig. When he approaches Peggy with a knife, Mrs. Elliott appears and shoots him to death. Mrs. Elliott proceeds to explain to Peggy that Jeffrey was obsessed with his sister, and that he murdered her years prior before encasing her corpse in one of his grandiose sculptures. After, Jeffrey would slip in and out of the alternate personality of his sister. Mrs. Elliott laments the situation, but tells Peggy that, as an old and lonely woman, she wanted to avoid her son being institutionalized, which would leave her alone. Peggy calmly picks up the phone and calls the police.

== Cast ==
- Bette Davis as Mrs. Elliott
- Ted Bessell as Jeffrey Elliot
- Sian Barbara Allen as Peggy Johns
- Christiane Schmidtmer as Jennifer Elliot
- Charles Drake as George Thornton
- Allan Arbus as Dr. Eugene Saks
- Tovah Feldshuh as Agnes Thornton

== Release ==
=== Critical response ===
Kevin Thomas of the Los Angeles Times deemed the film a "routine shocker," noting that "writers Jimmy Sangster and Arthur Hoffe have come up with such silly, trite dialog and situations that it's too bad that director Gordon Hessler... didn't play their script for laughs." Film writer Jerry Roberts notes in Encyclopedia of Television Film Directors that the film is "a patchwork artifact of what filmmakers in the movie-of-the-week era considered the ingredients for concocting a Psycho-like thriller."

=== Home media ===
In October 2021, Kino Lorber released the film for the first time on DVD and Blu-ray.
