= Chester Adgate Congdon =

American politician (1853–1916)

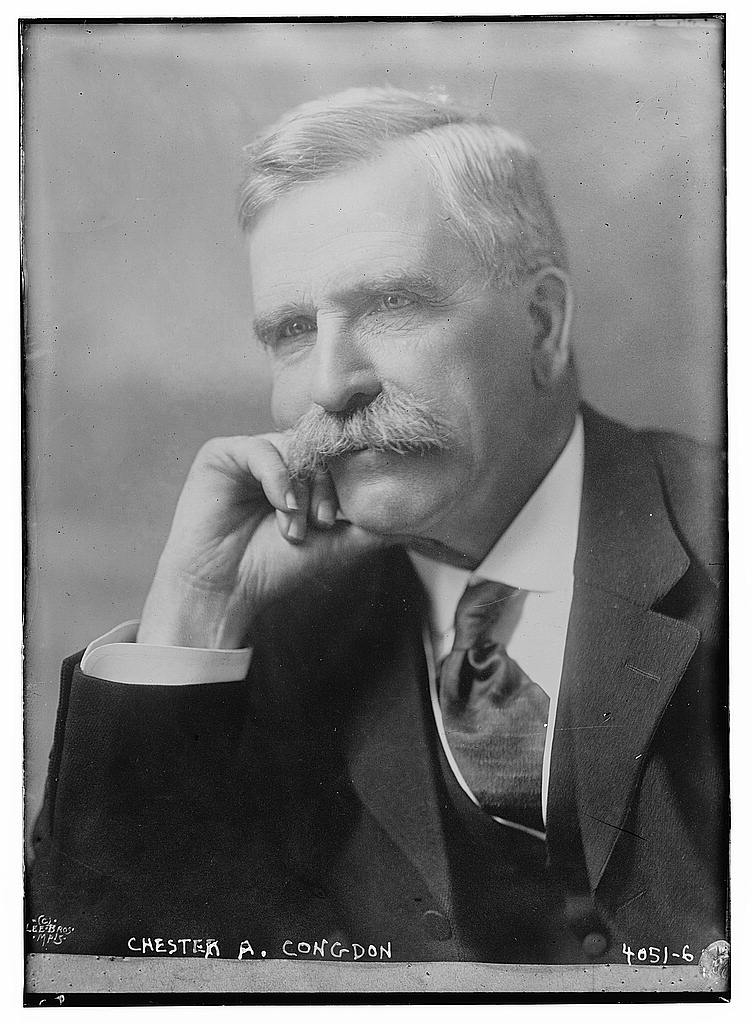
Congdon, c. 1915

Chester Adgate Congdon (June 12, 1853 – November 21, 1916) was an American lawyer and businessman. He was a prominent figure in the development of the mining industry in northern Minnesota, and served as a member of the Minnesota House of Representatives from 1909 until 1913. He commissioned the construction of the Glensheen Historic Estate (also known as the Chester and Clara Congdon Estate) in Duluth, Minnesota, which later became the site of the Glensheen murders.

== Early life ==
Chester Congdon was born in Rochester, New York, on June 12, 1853, as the son of Sylvester Laurentius and Laura Jane (née Adgate) Congdon. On his paternal side, Chester was the sixth in descent from James Congdon, a Quaker from England who settled in Rhode Island in the first half of the 17th century. All his paternal ancestors were English, while his maternal ancestors were English and Dutch. All his ancestry had been in North America since the early colonial period.

In the public schools of Elmira and Corning, New York, Congdon acquired his preliminary education, which was supplemented by study in the East Genesee Conference Seminary, a college-preparatory school affiliated with the Methodist Episcopal Church, at Ovid, New York. His collegiate work was done at Syracuse University, from which he graduated in 1875 with the degree of Bachelor of Arts. He studied law under the preceptorship of Hiscock, Gifford & Doheny in Syracuse, and in 1877 was admitted to the New York bar. After admission to the bar, Congdon taught school for about a year in Chippewa Falls, Wisconsin. In 1879, he went to Saint Paul, Minnesota, where he was admitted to the Minnesota bar and there established himself in the practice of law.

On September 29, 1881, in Syracuse, New York, Chester Congdon was married to Clara Hesperia, a daughter of the Rev. Edward Bannister, a Methodist clergyman of San Francisco, California and the first president of the University of the Pacific at Santa Clara. Together they had seven children: Walter Bannister Congdon, Edward Chester Congdon, Marjorie, Helen, John, Robert, and Elisabeth Congdon. Chester and Clara would later bring Clara's nephew Alfred Bannister to live with them after he was orphaned at the age of six.

== Business ==
In 1892, Congdon moved from St. Paul to Duluth and partnered with William W. Billson to form the law firm Billson & Congdon. In 1893, they were joined by judge Daniel A. Dickinson and the firm style of Billson, Congdon & Dickinson was adopted. On the death of the judge in 1902, the surviving partners resumed their original title and continued thus until 1904, when both retired from active practice.

In the meantime, Congdon had extended his efforts to various lines of commercial, industrial, and financial enterprise in Duluth. He became a prominent figure in connection with the development of the iron and copper mining resources of the Lake Superior country, and at the same time, his advice and assistance were sought by many business and financial institutions on the directorate of which his name never appeared. He was the general counsel of the Oliver Mining Company before its consolidation with other companies (now forming the United States Steel Corporation), the president of the Chemung Iron Company and the Canisteo Mining Company, and the vice-president of the American Exchange National Bank of Duluth. Additionally, he was a director in the Calumet & Arizona Mining Company of Bisbee, Arizona, the Hedley Gold Mining Company, William Cornell Greene's Greene Cananea Copper Company, the Marshall-Wells Hardware Company, the Gowan-Lenning-Brown Company, and various other banking, mining and jobbing enterprises which claimed his attention and profited by his cooperation and direction. He also became interested in agricultural pursuits, making extensive investments in farmlands in the northwest.

== Estate ==
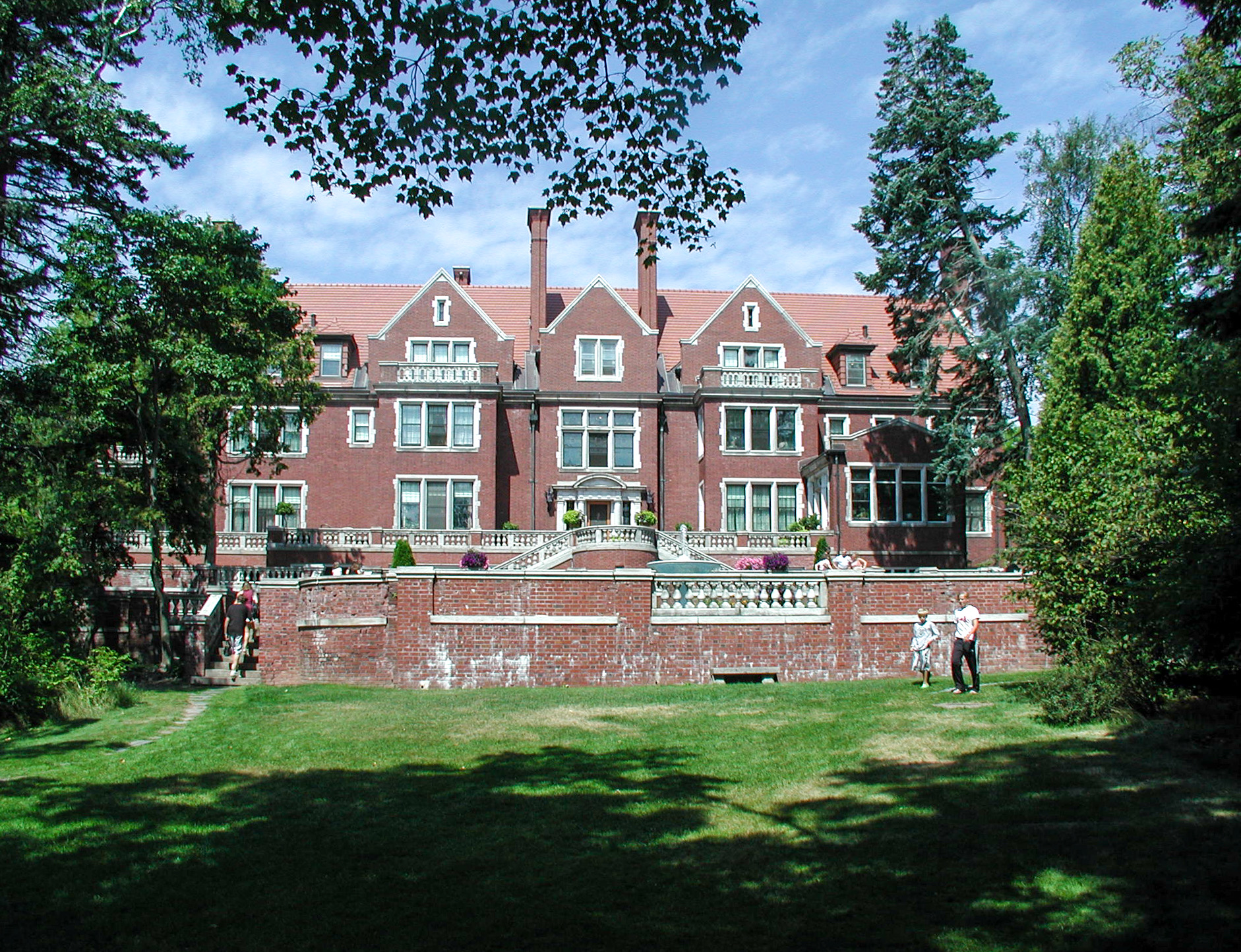
Glensheen

In May 1905, construction of the family estate began on a 22-acre (89,000 m^{2}) tract of land along the shore of Lake Superior. Named "Glensheen", its construction came with a hefty price tag of $854,000 ($30.6 million in 2025 dollars) and was finished in February 1908—the family had moved in a few months prior. The estate featured a turn-of-the-century mansion, hot water, electricity, and grounds irrigated from nearby Tischer Creek.

Glensheen Historic Estate is now owned by the University of Minnesota-Duluth and is open to the public year-round for tours.

== Politics ==
Congdon held several offices throughout his life, serving as assistant United States attorney for the district of Minnesota from 1881 until 1886, as a member of the Minnesota House of Representatives from 1909 until 1913, and as a member of the Duluth charter commission from 1903 until his death.

The 1909 Legislature was dominated by the tonnage tax, which would place a tax on all iron ore shipped out of state by companies that did not manufacture steel in Minnesota. Opponents, led by Congdon, argued that such a tax would inhibit the development of lower-grade iron ore properties, something Congdon was heavily invested in. The opposition succeeded in stopping the legislation, but Minnesota would eventually pass a tonnage tax in 1921.

Congdon was re-elected for the 1911 Legislature. As a returning legislator, Congdon had more influence and served on eleven committees. He was chair of the Reapportionment (Redistricting) Committee. As the leader in charge of redrawing the state's legislative districts, he attempted to give northeast Minnesota and the Twin Cities more senators. The boundaries were drawn in such a way to ensure more political power to the steel industry and those against the tonnage tax. His measure would eventually fail.

Congdon also voted against recall elections, against temperance measures, for limitations on workers going on strike, and for free public transport to policemen and firefighters. Along with his pro-brewery group of politicians, he was aligned with stopping a vote on ending child labor. In a record of the 1911 Legislature, Congdon was described as an intelligent and strong legislator who nevertheless “sacrificed all his fine qualities” to work with "brewery representatives and professional politicians", missing an opportunity to make the "legislature truly representative of the people".

In 1916, he was made a member of the Republican National Central Committee, and his opinions carried weight in the councils of the party. He was a member of various professional, historical, scientific, social, and fraternal societies and associations. He had membership with the Kitchi Gammi Club, Northland Country Club, Commercial Boat Club, and Duluth Boat Club, all in Duluth; the Minnesota Club of St. Paul; the Minneapolis Club of Minneapolis; the University Club of Chicago; the Duquesne Club of Pittsburgh, Pennsylvania; the Bankers Club of New York; the Commercial Club of North Yakima; and with various college fraternities, including the Upsilon Kappa, Psi Upsilon, Theta Nu Epsilon, and Phi Beta Kappa.

A contemporary biographer has said of him: "Those who really knew Mr. Congdon found in him a man of tender heart and warm, human sympathies. His philanthropy was general and quite well known, although he sought to keep it under cover and shrank from publicity in this regard. He was a close student of government and state policies, a foe of waste and inefficiency, a friend of political progress as he saw it, a champion of clean public life and sound government. He was always the good citizen, eager to have his part in every forward movement in directions that he judged to be wise."

== Family ==
Wife: Clara Hesperia Bannister (April 29, 1854 – July 12, 1950)

Children:

- Walter Bannister Congdon (November 5, 1882 – October 20, 1949)
- Edward Chester Congdon (May 20, 1885 – November 27, 1940)
- Marjorie Congdon (Dudley) (January 12, 1887 – October 11, 1971)
- Helen Clara Congdon (d'Autremont) (February 16, 1889 – May 19, 1966)
- John Congdon (May 21, 1891 – May 19, 1893)
- Elisabeth Mannering Congdon (April 22, 1894 – June 27, 1977)
- Robert Congdon (September 4, 1898 – June 12, 1975)
