= Hronské Kľačany =

Village and municipality in Slovakia

Hronské Kľačany Garamkelecsény
- Municipality
- Roman Catholic church

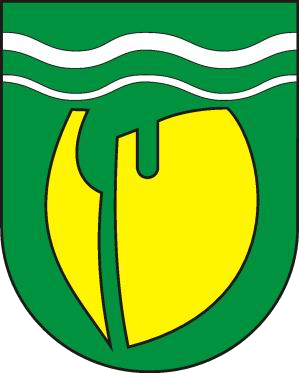
- Flag Coat of arms

- Location of Hronské Kľačany in the Nitra Region Location of Hronské Kľačany in Slovakia
- Coordinates: 48.23°N 18.57°E
- Country: Slovakia
- Region: Nitra Region
- District: Levice District
- First mentioned: 1275

Area
  - Total: 7.88 km^{2} (3.04 sq mi)
- Elevation: 164 m (538 ft)

Population (2025)
  - Total: 1,398
- Time zone: UTC+1 (CET)
  - Summer (DST): UTC+2 (CEST)
- Postal code: 935 26
- Area code: +421 36
- Vehicle registration plate (until 2022): LV
- Website: www.hronskeklacany.sk

Hronské Kľačany (Hungarian: Garamkelecsény) is a village and municipality in the Levice District in the Nitra Region of Slovakia.

== Etymology ==
Slovak Kľačane. See Kľačany for details.

== History ==
In historical records the village was first mentioned in 1275.

== Geography ==
The municipality lies at an altitude of 164 metres (538 ft) and covers an area of 7.88 km^{2} (3.04 sq mi) (2025).

== Population ==
Population statistic (10 years)
Year	1995	2005	2015	2025
Count	1488	1448	1430	1398
Difference		−2.68%	−1.24%	−2.23%

Population statistic
Year	2024	2025
Count	1400	1398
Difference		−0.14%

It has a population of 1398 people (31 December 2025).

=== Ethnicity ===
Census 2021 (1+%)
Ethnicity	Number	Fraction
Slovak	1338	95.5%
Not found out	49	3.49%
Total	1401	

In year 2021 was 1401 people by ethnicity 1338 as Slovak, 49 as Not found out, 8 as Hungarian, 8 as Other, 4 as Czech, 3 as Polish and 2 as Russian.

Note on population: The difference values of population numbers in the table "Population statistic" and in the sections "Ethnicity" & "Religion" is caused by the use of various statistical methods.

=== Religion ===
Census 2021 (1+%)
Religion	Number	Fraction
Roman Catholic Church	1111	79.3%
None	199	14.2%
Not found out	52	3.71%
Evangelical Church	16	1.14%
Total	1401	

In year 2021 was 1401 people by religion 1111 from Roman Catholic Church, 199 from None, 52 from Not found out, 16 from Evangelical Church, 5 from Other and not ascertained christian church, 5 from Ad hoc movements, 4 from Greek Catholic Church, 3 from Other, 2 from Calvinist Church, 2 from Islam, 1 from New Apostolic Church and 1 from Christian Congregations in Slovakia.

== Facilities ==
The village has a public library, a gym and a football pitch.

== Genealogical resources ==
The records for genealogical research are available at the state archive "Statny Archiv in Nitra, Slovakia".

- Roman Catholic church records (births/marriages/deaths): 1709–1896 (parish B)
- Reformed church records (births/marriages/deaths): 1697–1825 (parish B)

== See also ==
- List of municipalities and towns in Slovakia
