= Albert Lorey Groll =

American artist (1866–1952)

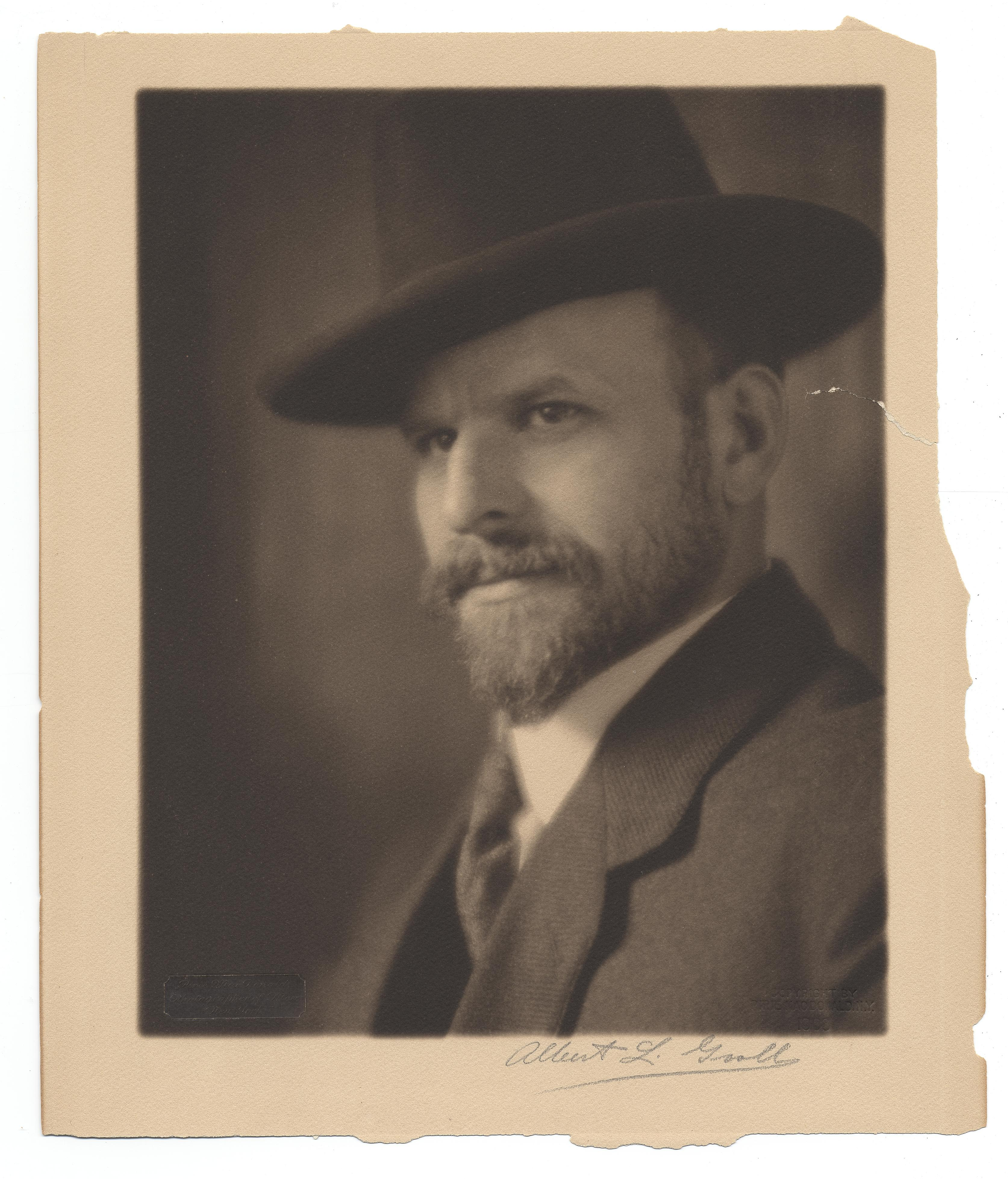
- Albert Groll in 1906
- Born: December 8, 1866; New York City, United States
- Died: October 2, 1952; New York City
- Education: Royal Academy of Fine Arts (Antwerp); Academy of Fine Arts, Munich
- Known for: Landscape painting
- Awards: George Inness Gold Medal
- Elected: National Academy of Design

Albert Lorey Groll (1866–1952) was an American artist and etcher. He was born in New York City and studied at the Academy of Fine Arts in Munich, Germany, the Royal Academy in Antwerp, Belgium, and for some time in London. In 1910 he was elected into the National Academy of Design. He is best known for his landscape paintings of the American Southwest.

== Life and career ==
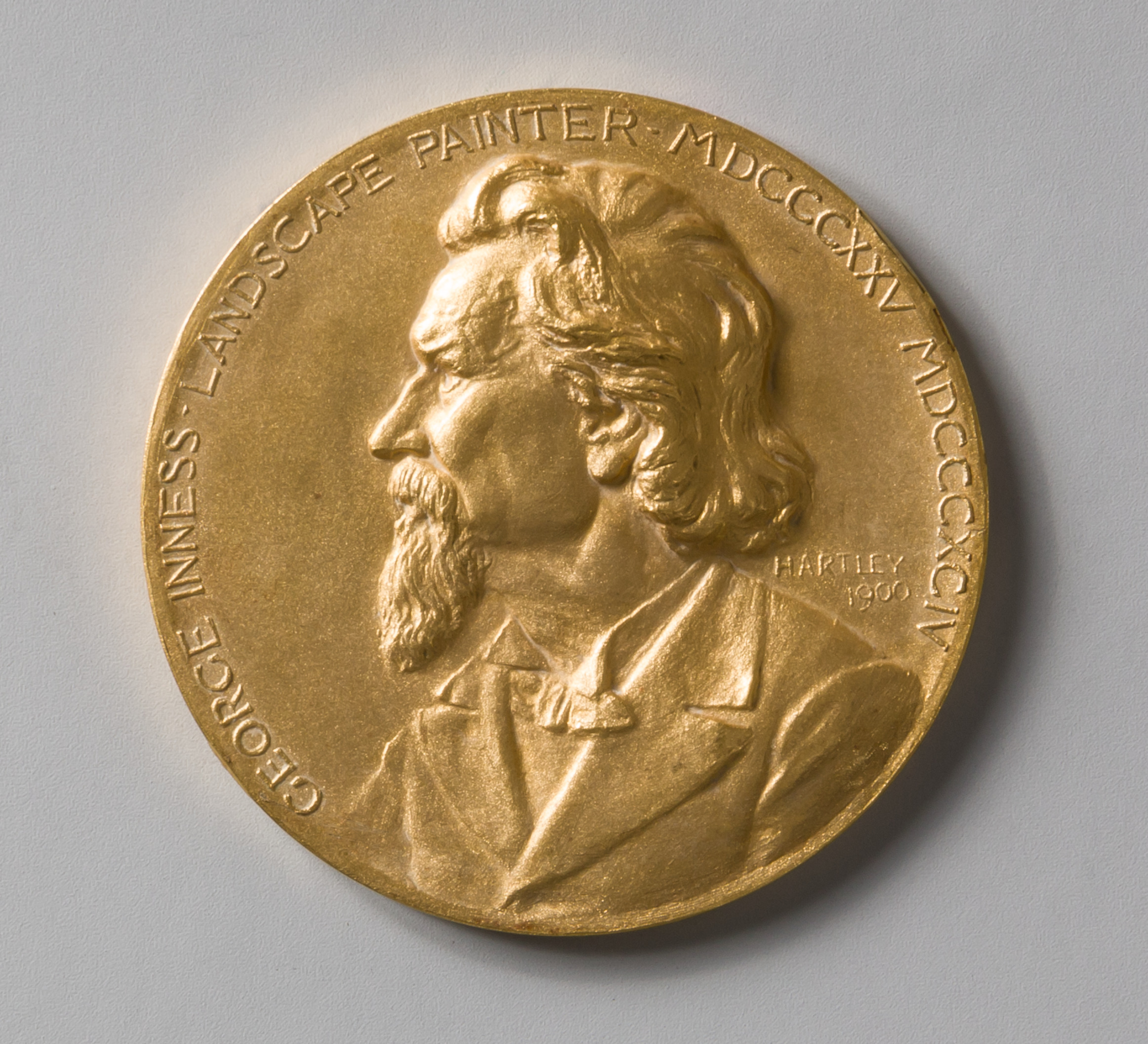
George Inness gold medal

Groll was born in New York in 1866, the son of a pharmacist immigrant from Darmstadt, Germany. During his early years he travelled to Europe to study at the Academy of Fine Arts in Munich, then called Royal Academy of Fine Arts, under Nicholas Gysis and Ludwig von Löfftz. He also studied in London and in the Royal Academy of Fine Arts in Antwerp, Belgium. Groll went back to New York in 1895 and moved from figure painting to landscape painting in part due to the high cost of hiring models. He also became well known as an etcher.

In 1904 Groll made the first of several trips to the American Southwest, travelling to Arizona with ethnographer Stewart Culin of the Brooklyn Museum, and later going to New Mexico with his friend the artist and illustrator William Robinson Leigh. He mostly focused on oil paintings of the Native American lands, which were mostly realistic, however, encompassed some abstract shapes as well. The Laguna Pueblo people were impressed by Groll's paintings and gave him the name "Chief Bald Head Eagle Eye".

Groll kept a studio in the Gainsborough Studios in Manhattan, and won several awards for his work in both Arizona and New York, such as the Salmagundi Club Shaw Prize in 1904, and a gold medal at the Pennsylvania Academy of Fine Arts in 1906. He also won a George Inness gold medal in 1912 for his painting of Lake Louise in the Canadian Rockies. This medal was awarded in the annual exhibit of National Academy of Design from 1901 to 1918 to the best landscape paintings.

In 1910 he was elected into the National Academy of Design, in 1919 Groll was elected as an associate member of the Taos Society of Artists, and in 1933 became a member of the National Institute of Arts and Letters. He was also invited to join the American Watercolor Society.

He died on 2 October 1952, aged 85 years old, with funeral services held at the Frank E. Campbell Funeral Chapel in Manhattan.

=== Selected exhibitions ===
- Venice Biennale, Venice, 1909.
- Carnegie International, Pittsburgh, 1910.
- Panama–Pacific International Exposition, San Francisco, 1915.

== Style and legacy ==
Groll's work is characterized by his skillful technique, rich colors, and poetic approach to landscape, being called a "musical dreamer in color", and "America's sky painter". His landscapes are mostly realistic but also use abstract shapes. The musical quality of his works was recognized by contemporary musicians, and a painting by Groll inspired by an Edward MacDowell symphony was kept by the composer in his bedroom.

Groll helped popularize the desert as an artistic subject for American art, introducing other artists from the East coast such as William Robinson Leigh to the Southwest. Groll's paintings are part of the collections of museums such as the Smithsonian American Art Museum, Gilcrease Museum, the University of Arizona Museum of Art, and the San Diego Museum of Art, among others.

== Gallery ==
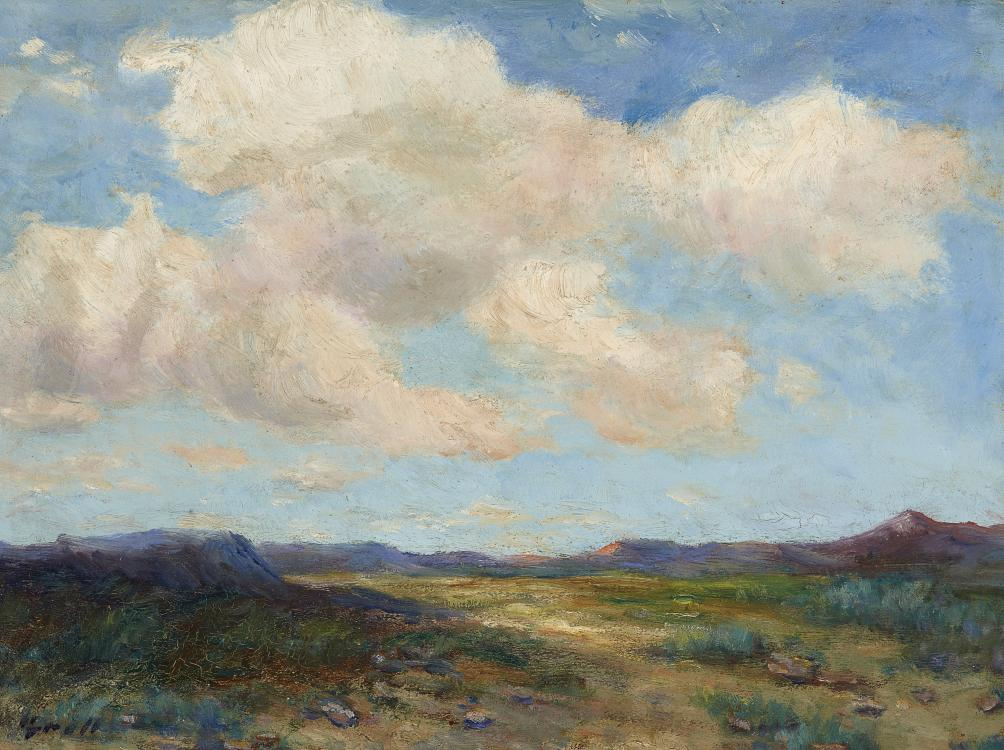
"Acoma Valley", Gilcrease Museum

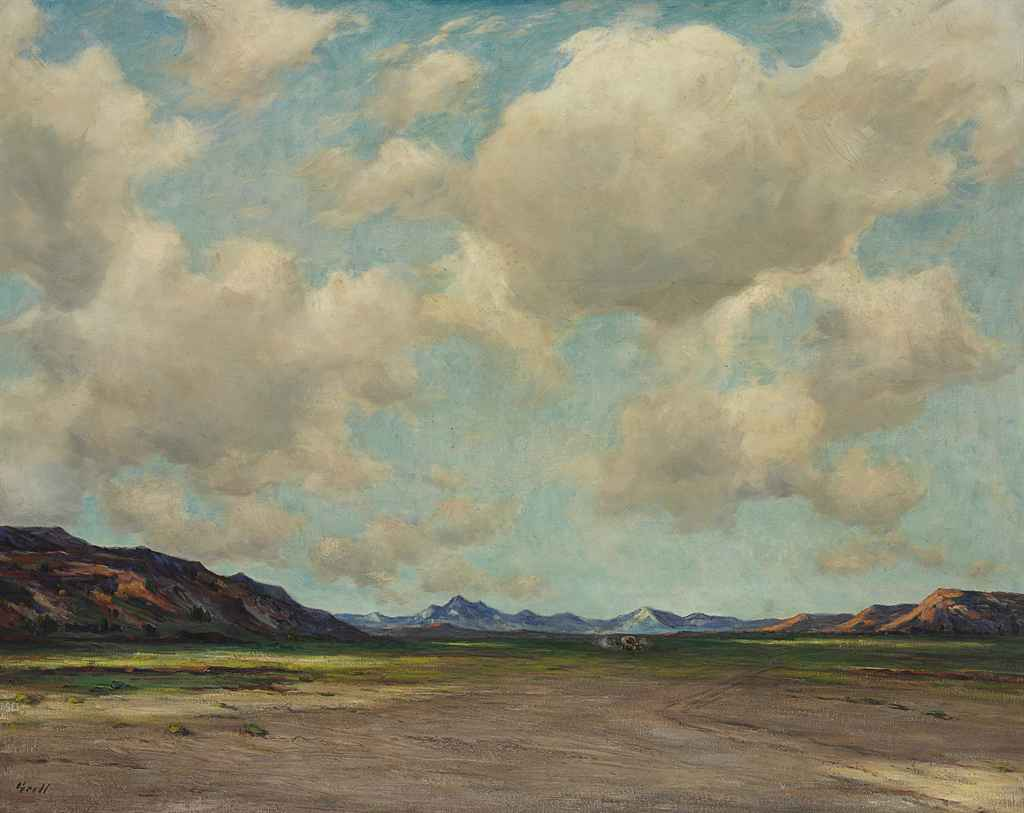
"Apache Trail, Arizona"

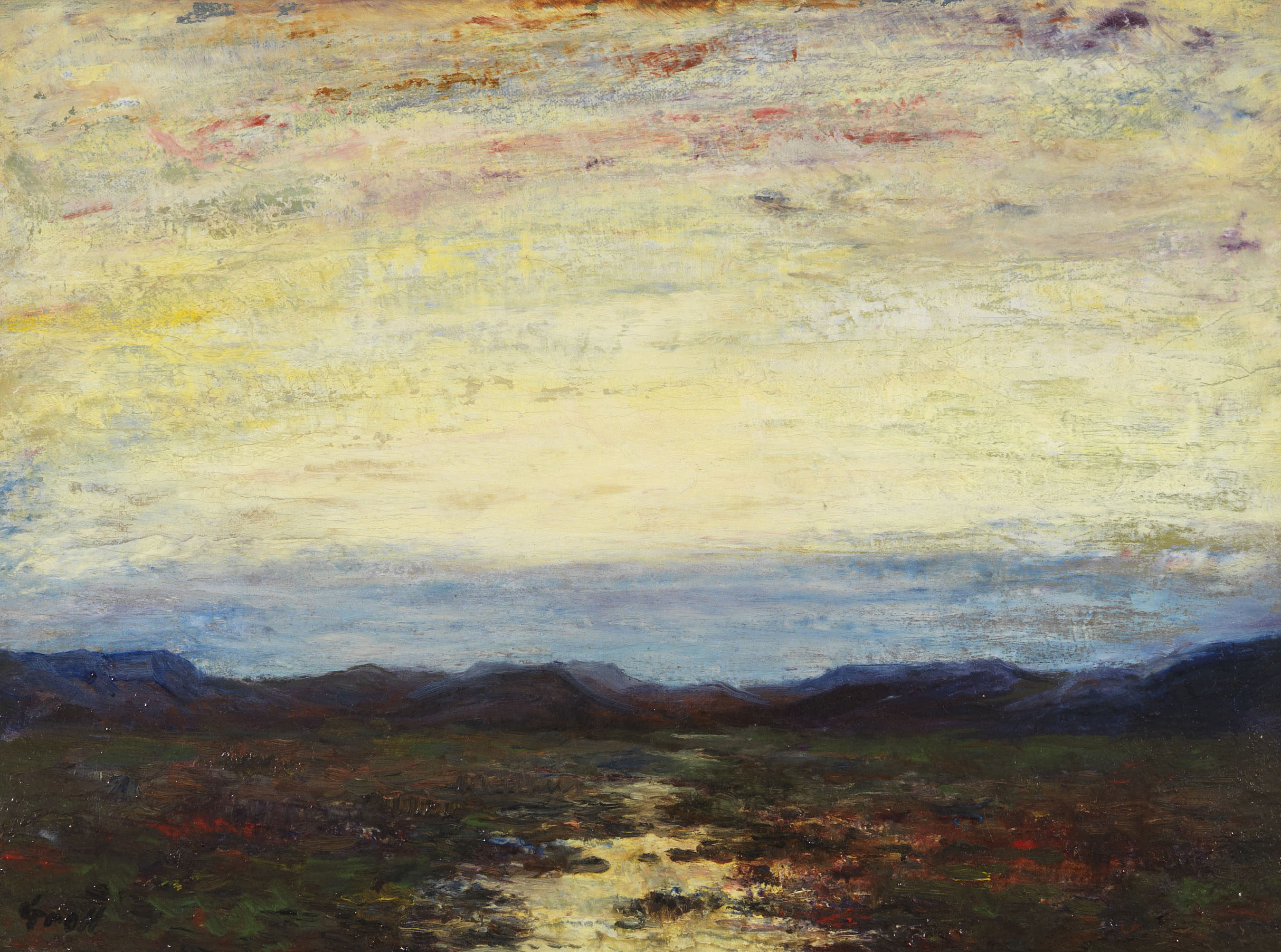
"Sunset in Nevada"

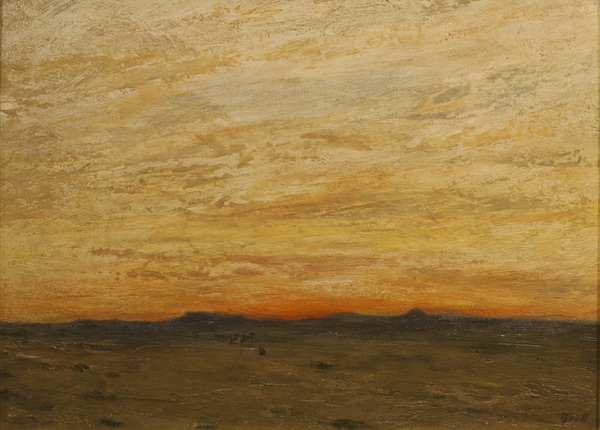
"Arizona Desert" (c. 1929),

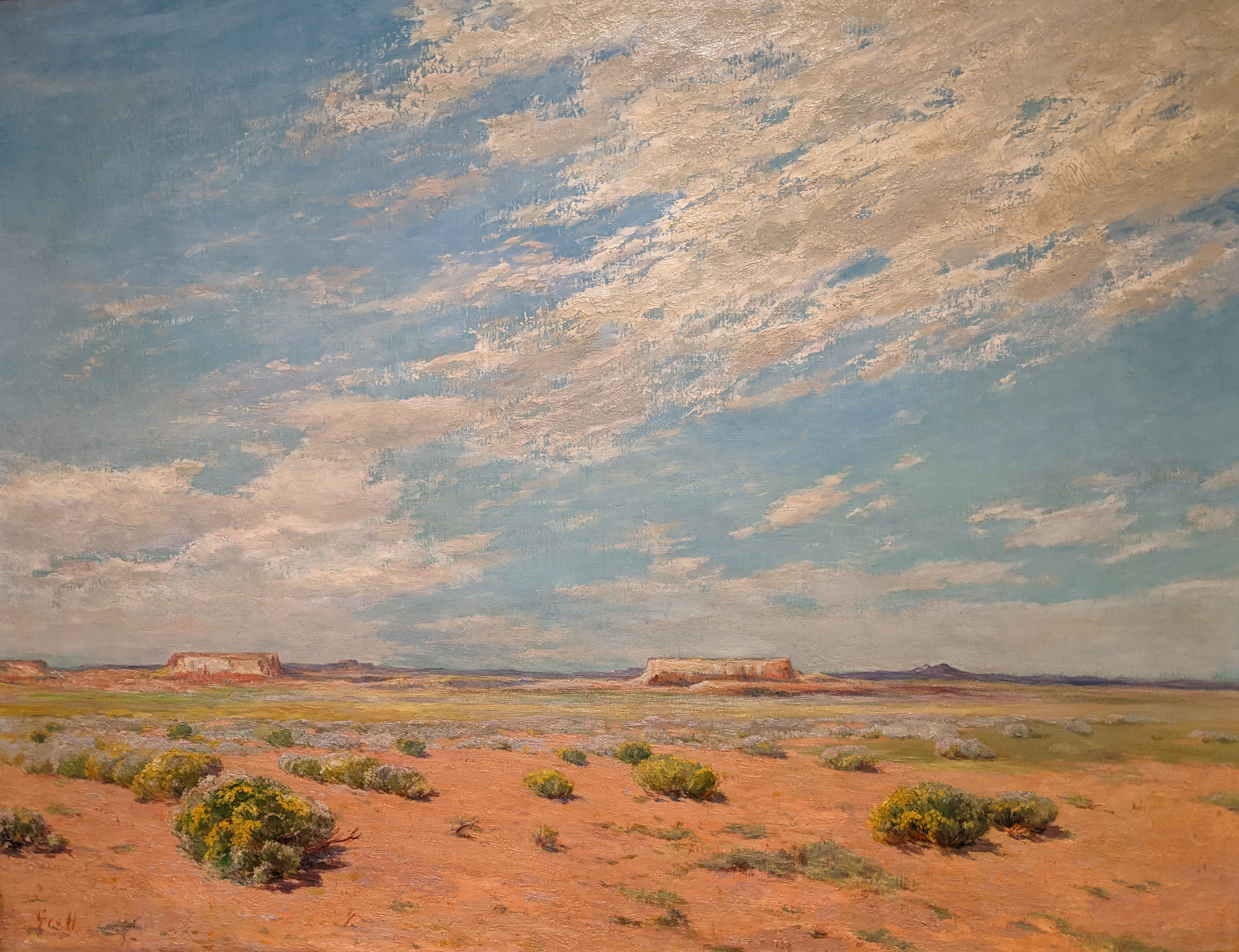
"The Painted Desert - Arizona" (1915), Phoenix Art Museum

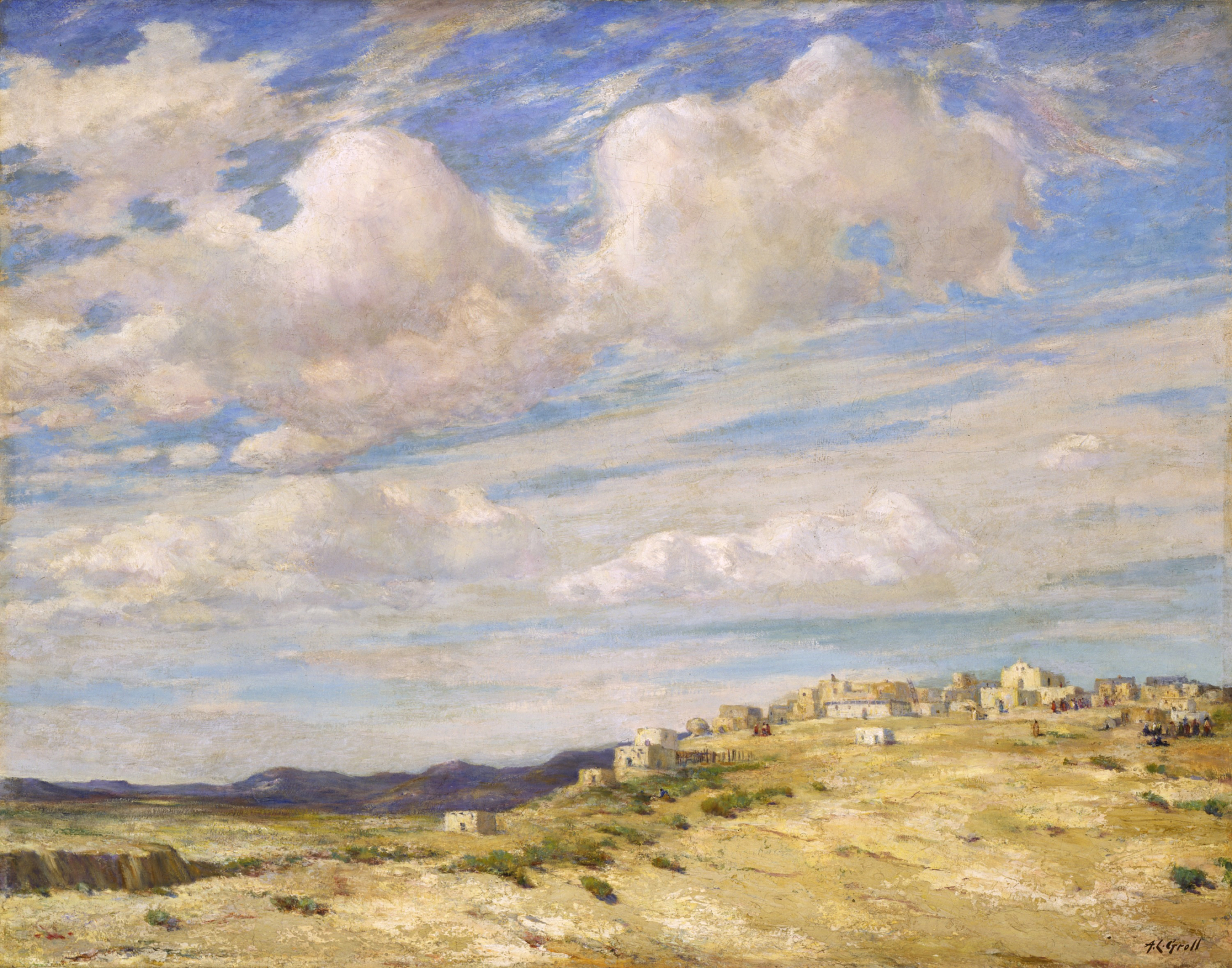
"Laguna, New Mexico" (c. 1912), Smithsonian American Art Museum
