= Ludwig von Löfftz =

German painter (1845–1910)

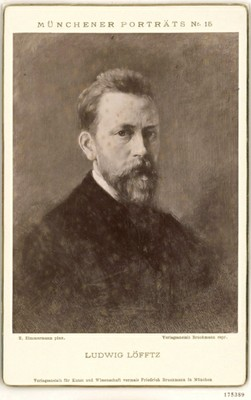
Ludwig von Löfftz

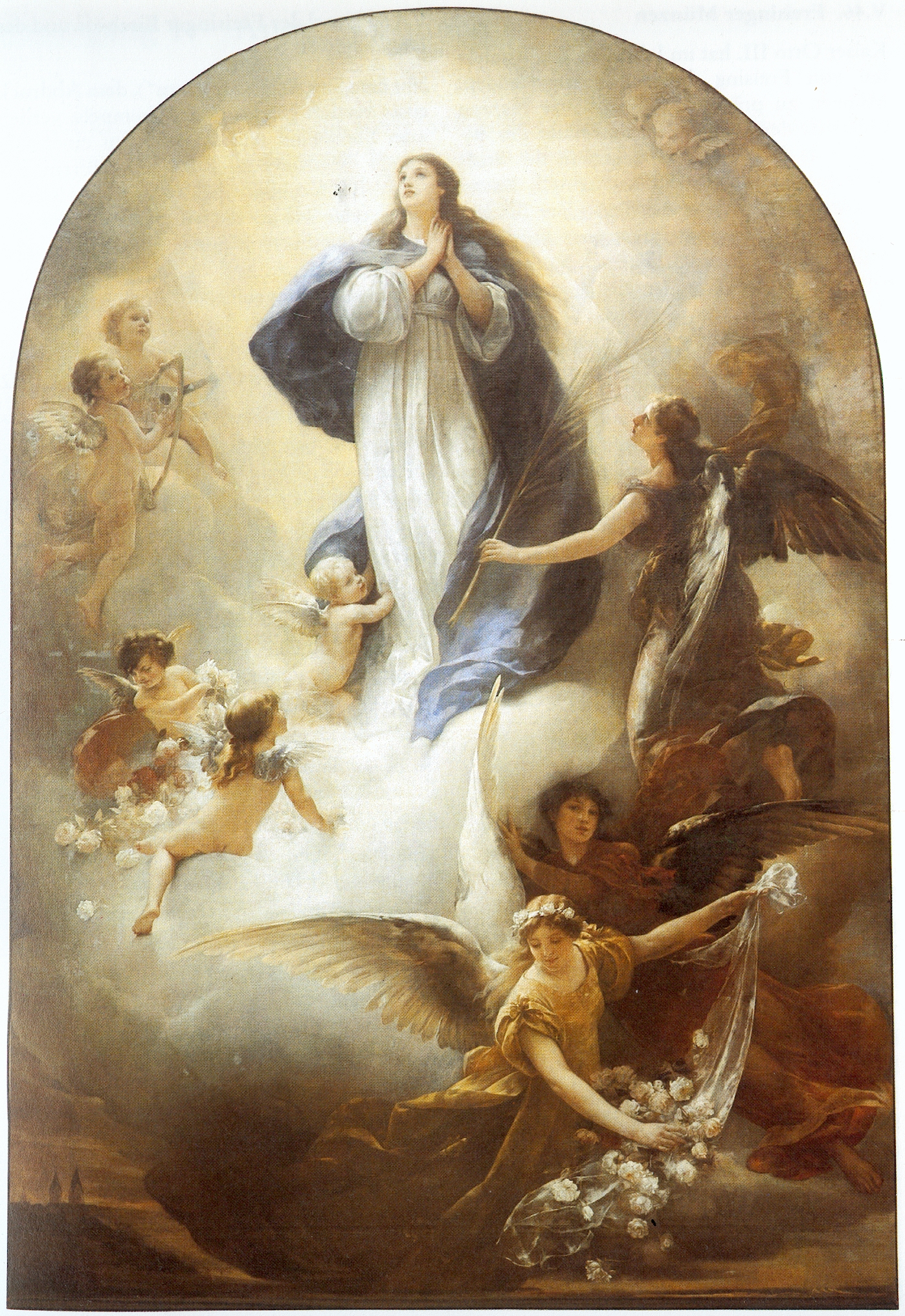
The Ascension of Mary (1888)

Ludwig von Löfftz (21 June 1845 – 3 December 1910) was a German genre and landscape painter.

== Biography ==
He was born at Darmstadt. He was a pupil of August von Kreling and Karl Raupp at Nuremberg, then of Wilhelm von Diez at the Academy of Fine Arts Munich, where he became professor in 1879, and of which he was director between 1891 and 1899. Löfftz's chief importance lay in his influence as a teacher. In 1884 he began teaching Anton Ažbe. Among his students were also Lovis Corinth and the American Albert Lorey Groll.

Löfftz's works are not numerous, but are of great perfection. A lofty atmosphere pervades his interiors, treated in the spirit of the Flemish masters, while his religious subjects are imbued with deep feeling and solemn grandeur. Great technical skill and masterly treatment of the chiaroscuro produce the most harmonious effects in all of his paintings. The impressive "Pietà" (1883) won him the gold medal at the International Exhibition in Munich and is now in the Neue Pinakothek, which also contains Eurydice (1898).

== Works ==
Among his works are:

- Cardinal Playing the Organ (1876)
- Avarice and Love (1879)
- Erasmus in his Study (Stuttgart)
- An Old Woman (Frankfurt)
- The Money Changers (1845)
