= Glensheen murders =

1977 murder case in Minnesota, United States

The Glensheen murders refers to the murders of Elisabeth Mannering Congdon and her night nurse Velma Pietila on June 27, 1977, in Duluth, Minnesota, USA, at the Glensheen Historic Estate.

The motive was initially thought to be robbery, but authorities soon began to suspect Congdon's son-in-law Roger Caldwell and his wife, the Congdon's adopted daughter Marjorie. Eventually Caldwell would be convicted and Majorie would be acquitted. Later she would be found guilty of arson and fraud, crimes for which she served prison time.

== Background ==
Chester Adgate Congdon married Clara Hesperia Bannister in 1881 and together they had seven children. In 1905 Chester began building Glensheen, a 39-room mansion on their 22-acre (89,000 m^{2}) estate in Duluth, Minnesota. It was finished three years later. Chester died in 1916 and Clara in 1950, upon which their daughter Elisabeth, born April 22, 1894, inherited Glensheen.

Elisabeth never married. In 1932 she adopted a daughter, Jacqueline Barnes, and renamed her Marjorie Mannering Congdon. A second daughter, Jennifer Susan Congdon (1935-2017), was adopted in 1935.

Marjorie had seven children by her first husband. She was divorced after twenty years of marriage. Marjorie moved to Colorado and married Roger Caldwell.

At the time of her death Elisabeth needed round-the-clock care following a stroke. She was paralyzed on one side and used a wheelchair. Because of her illness, her fortune was being held by a trust. Marjorie's own trust fund had been wiped out by spending and the Congdon trustees cut Marjorie and Roger off. Their house was foreclosed on and their cars repossessed.

Before Elisabeth's death, the family had planned to donate the Glensheen Mansion to the University of Minnesota Duluth.

== Murders ==
On June 27, 1977, at 7:00am, Elisabeth Congdon and her nurse Velma Pietila (born April 26, 1911) were found murdered. Pietila's skull had been fractured by a blow from a brass candlestick: her body was found on the grand staircase in the mansion. Congdon had been suffocated in her bed with a satin pillow. Pietila had been a regular nurse for Mrs. Congdon until she retired and had come out of retirement to fill in for another nurse that evening.

The motive was initially thought to be robbery, as the bedroom had been ransacked and a jewelry box was missing. Pietila's car was discovered the next morning in the airport parking lot.

== Arrests ==
Elisabeth's daughter Marjorie became an immediate suspect, being desperate for money and set to receive $8 million on her mother's death. Three days before Elisabeth's death, Marjorie had authorized a paper saying Roger was to receive about $2.5 million of her share.

Marjorie and Roger were arrested based on evidence found at the scene and in Roger and Marjorie's possession, including hairs found grasped in the nurse's hand, and a fingerprint on an envelope mailed from Glensheen to Caldwell on the day of the murders. Roger Caldwell was tried first and convicted in 1978.

Marjorie was arrested the day after her husband's conviction but acquitted in 1979. During the trial, the fingerprint on an envelope, which had been a key piece of evidence in Mr. Caldwell's trial, was contested by an expert. In addition, a witness came forward during the trial to testify to Roger Caldwell's whereabouts, though the witness recanted after the trial.

In 1982, the Minnesota Supreme Court overturned Caldwell's conviction and ordered a new trial based on the additional evidence found during Marjorie's trial. Rather than risk an acquittal at retrial, the prosecution offered him a plea deal: a confession and guilty plea to second-degree murder in return for time served (he had served five years of a twenty-year sentence). He confessed to both murders on July 5, 1983, and was released. He committed suicide and died on May 18, 1988.

5 of Marjorie's 7 children filed a civil suit against her inheritance, arguing she was involved in the murder. She was limited to an income of $40,000 a year from the trust.

John DeSanto, the prosecutor of the case, kept a key piece of evidence from the trial, the envelope with the fingerprint that was contested. Years later, he had it DNA tested and it was a 99% match for Roger Caldwell.

== Aftermath ==
The Glensheen house was opened to public tours two years after the murders, but tour guides were instructed not to speak of them. The estate changed this policy in 2005, although guides would not raise the subject of the murders unless asked about them

After Caldwell's death Marjorie was accused of bigamy, arson and attempted murder. She spent nearly two years in prison in the 1980s for the arson of her own home shared with third husband, Wally Hagen, who died in 1992. Upon her release from prison, she was arrested for arson again, receiving a fifteen year sentence. About three years after her release from prison, she was arrested for computer fraud and several other counts. She pleaded guilty to fraud and removing money from the bank account of Roger Sammis, who prior to his death had been under her care. She received three years probation in 2009.

== Musical ==
A musical retelling of the story was created in 2017 by Jeffrey Hatcher and Chan Poling and has run on and off in Minnesota since then. In May 2026 the musical received its first performance outside of the USA with a premiere in Belgium.
