= New Alliance Records =

- Parent company: SST Records
- Founded: 1980
- Founder: D. Boon; Mike Watt; Martin Tamburovich
- Defunct: 1998
- Distributors: Enigma Records, SST Records
- Genre: Various
- Country of origin: United States
- Location: Lawndale, California

New Alliance Records was an independent record label founded by American musicians D. Boon and Mike Watt (of The Minutemen) and longtime friend and associate Martin Tamburovich. They were inspired by the example of their friends in southern California, Black Flag, who had earlier formed SST Records. The existence of SST led Watt to understand, according to a 1987 interview he gave to Musician magazine, how easy it was to get a record made: "All you had to do was pay the record plant man."

The label's first release was the 1980 various-artist compilation Cracks in the Sidewalk, which included tracks by the Minutemen, Black Flag, and Saccharine Trust. Other early releases on New Alliance included Hüsker Dü's first album Land Speed Record and the Minutemen's second-ever release, the seven-inch EP Joy. Eventually the label grew to nurture the early career of the Descendents, issue additional compilation albums (Chunks and Mighty Feeble) and release other recordings by the Minutemen (The Politics of Time), Secret Hate (Vegetables Dancing), and Hüsker Dü (In a Free Land EP). The label also showcased a number of post-punk bands from the South Bay area of southern California, notably Slovenly, Phantom Opera, and Invisiblechains.

After D. Boon's death in 1985 due to a car-accident and the increasingly busier schedule of Watt's post-Minutemen band Firehose, Watt and Tamburovich sold New Alliance to SST in 1987. Greg Ginn, SST's owner and Black Flag's guitarist, proceeded to transfer all of the Minutemen and Descendents back catalog and Hüsker Dü's Land Speed Record to SST and turned New Alliance into a subsidiary label of SST that concentrated on more adventurous and non-mainstream records, including jazz, instrumental, poetry, and spoken-word releases. New Alliance also released the debut single of Ciccone Youth and material from The Coachmen, both of which were Sonic Youth-related projects.

New Alliance ceased its operations in 1998 in order to save money. Its back-catalog has been deleted, its releases are no longer available through SST Records, and there is no mention of the label or its artists on SST's website.

Label co-founder Tamburovich died of a bacterial infection in 2003.

Rapp Records founder Rad Ramsey and Martin Tamburovich reactivated New Alliance in 2000 as a Rapp Records sublabel. It also brought back its back catalog. This time it specialized in rap, rock and Reissuing its old material. However, in 2006, SST filed a case against Rapp and forced Ramsey to close down New Alliance.

== Catalogue ==
Catalogue number	Year	Artist	Title
NAR 001	1980	Various	Cracks in the Sidewalk
NAR 002	1981	Slivers	Restraint for Style
NAR 003	1981	Various	Chunks
NAR 004	1981	Minutemen	Joy
NAR 005	1981	Descendents	Fat
NAR 006	1981	The Salvation Army	Mind Gardens
NAR 007	1982	Hüsker Dü	Land Speed Record
NAR 008	1982	Various	Feeble Efforts
NAR 009	Unreleased	Peer Group	Rhetoric and Hands
NAR 010	1982	Hüsker Dü	In a Free Land
NAR 011	1982	Plebs	A Collection of Question Marks
NAR 012	1982	Descendents	Milo Goes to College
NAR 013	1983	Various	Mighty Feeble
NAR 014	1983	Tragicomedy	Homage to Nada
NAR 015	1984	Blood on the Saddle	Blood on the Saddle
NAR 016	1983	Secret Hate	Vegetables Dancing
NAR 017	1984	Minutemen	The Politics of Time
NAR 018	1984	Nip Drivers	Destroy Whitey
NAR 019	1984	Slovenly	Even So
NAR 020	1984	Slovenly	After the Original Style
NAR 021	1985	Invisible Chains	Invisible Chains
NAR 022	1986	Phantom Opera	Phantom Opera
NAR 023	1986	Steve Stain	The Brain Feels No Pain
NAR 024	1986	Michael C. Ford	Language Commando
NAR 025	1985	Descendents	Bonus Fat
NAR 026	1985	Descendents	I Don't Want to Grow Up
NAR 027	1986	Slovenly	Peter
NAR 028	1986	What Makes Donna Twirl?	Amber Skin
NAR 029	1986	Descendents	Enjoy!
NAR 030	1986	Ciccone Youth	Burnin' Up
NAR 031	1988	Michelle T. Clinton & Wanda Coleman	Black Angeles
NAR 032	1986	Dos	Dos
NAR 033	1986	Crimony	Reverence
NAR 034	1988	Phantom Opera	Lives of Violence
NAR 035	1988	The Coachmen	Failure to Thrive
NAR 036	1988	Rudolph Grey	Transfixed
NAR 037	1988	Yanomamos	Quizas
NAR 038	1988	Crimony	The Crimony EP
NAR 039	1990	Jack Brewer Band	Rockin' Ethereal
NAR 040	1988	Martin Bisi	Creole Mass
NAR 041	1990	GobbleHoof	GobbleHoof
NAR 042	1989	Office Ladies	Brains in Bed Brains and Boots No Boots in Bed
NAR 043	1989	No Man / No Man's Band	Damage the Enemy
NAR 044	1989	Dos	Numero Dos
NAR 045	1989	Various	Taste Test #1
NAR 046	1989	Bootstrappers	Bootstrappers
NAR 047	1989	The Death Folk	Deathfolk
NAR 048	1990	Wanda Coleman	High Priestess of Word
NAR 049	1990	Solomon Grundy	Solomon Grundy
NAR 050	1991	Rudolph Grey	Mask of Light
NAR 051	1990	Roger Miller	Presents: Xylyl and a Woman in Half
NAR 052	1990	The Purple Outside	Mystery Lane
NAR 053	1993	Various	Eternal Voices (Traditional Vietnamese Music in the United States)
NAR 054	1991	Various	JazzSpeak: a Word Collection
NAR 055	1991	Sproton Layer	With Magnetic Fields Disrupted
NAR 056	1991	Blackmadrid	Atlantic Crossing: the People's Journey
NAR 057	1993	M-3	Roger Miller, Ben Miller, Larry Miller
NAR 058	Unreleased	Unknown	Unknown
NAR 059	1991	Wanda Coleman, Marv Evans	Berserk on Hollywood Blvd.
NAR 060	Unreleased	Unknown	Unknown
NAR 061	1991	Dos	Uno con Dos
NAR 062	1991	Marisela Norte	Norte/word
NAR 063	1991	Jack Brewer Band	Harsh World
NAR 064	1992	Scott Richardson	Tornado Souvenirs
NAR 065	1991	Danny Weizmann	The Wet Dog Shakes
NAR 066	1993	Michelle T. Clinton	Blood as a Bright Color
NAR 067	1992	Various	DisClosure: Voices of Women
NAR 068	1993	Louie Lista	To Sleep with the Lights On (Blues Theater)
NAR 069	1992	Various	Innings & Quarters
NAR 070	1993	Joel Lipman	Down Your Street
NAR 071	1993	Linda J. Albertano	Skin
NAR 072	1993	Harry E. Northup	Personal Crime
NAR 073	1996	John Sinclair	Thelonious: a Book of Monk Volume 1
NAR 074	1993	Tommy Swerdlow	Prisoner of the Gifted Sleep
NAR 075	1993	Martin Bisi	All Will Be Won
NAR 076	1992	The Death Folk	Deathfolk II
NAR 077	1992	The Blue Humans featuring Rudolph Grey	Clear to Higher Time
NAR 078	1995	Jack Brewer	Rhythm or Suicide (Poems and Writings)
NAR 079	Unreleased	Unknown	Unknown
NAR 080	1992	GobbleHoof	FreezerBurn
NAR 081	1995	Deborah Patino	Nocturnal
NAR 082	1994	Michael C. Ford	Fire Escapes
NAR 083	1993	Holly Prado	Word Rituals
NAR 084	1994	Various	Internal Journal
NAR 085	1993	Bill Mohr	Vehemence
NAR 086	1993	Pleasant Gehman	Ruined
NAR 087	1992	Steve Abee	Jerusalem Donuts
NAR 088	Unreleased	Unknown	Unknown
NAR 089	1994	Luis Campos	Poetry!
NAR 090	1993	Paul Body	Love Is Like Rasputin
NAR 091	1994	Miles Ciletti	Long Days and Monster Nights
NAR 092	1994	Mick Vranich & Wordban'd	Cloak of Skin
NAR 093	1994	Lynn Manning	Clarity of Vision
NAR 094	1994	Chuck Dukowski, Paul Cutler, Bill Stinson	United Gang Members
NAR 095	1993	Luis Alfaro	Down Town
NAR 096	Unreleased	Unknown	Unknown
NAR 097	1994	Roger Miller	Oh
NAR 098	1993	Mick Vranich	Idols of Fear
NAR 099	Unreleased	Unknown	Unknown
NAR 100	1997	Danny Weizmann	Hollywoodland
NAR 101	1995	Louie Lista, David Crittendon	Walkin' & Talkin'
NAR 102	1994	Michael Lally	What You Find There
NAR 103	1993	Eloise Klein Healy	Artemis in Echo Park / The Women's Studies Chronicles
NAR 104	1993	The Blue Humans featuring Rudolph Grey	To Higher Time
NAR 105	1993	Overpass	Overpass
NAR 106	1994	Jack Brewer and Bazooka	Saved from Death in the Dream World
NAR 107	Unreleased	Unknown	Unknown
NAR 108	1995	Iris Berry	Life on the Edge in Stilettos
NAR 109	1995	Quincy Troupe	Root Doctor
NAR 110	1994	Dingle	Red Dog
NAR 111	1994	Elisabeth Belile	Your Only Other Option Is Surgery
NAR 112	1994	Henry J. Morro	Somoza's Teeth
NAR 113	1994	Willie Sims	Story Yeller
NAR 114	Unreleased	Unknown	Unknown
NAR 115	1994	Various	Internal Journal, Vol. II
NAR 116	1994	Lisa Freeman	Rough Roads
NAR 117	1994	Dr. Noah Young	Freaks: No Fear of Contagion
NAR 118	Unreleased	Unknown	Unknown
NAR 119	1996	Kathi Martin	Rocky Road
NAR 120	1995	Harry E. Northup	Homes
NAR 121	Unreleased	Unknown	Unknown
NAR 122	1995	Julie Ritter	Medicine Show
NAR 123	1995	Martin Bisi y las Cochinas	See Ya in Tia Juana
NAR 124	1996	Martin Bisi y las Cochinas	Dear Papi, I'm in Jail
NAR 125	1997	Jack Brewer and Bazooka	Elysian Intervals
NAR 126	1997	The Reluctant Toby	The Ultimate Hobby

== See also ==
- List of record labels
