= Niagara (painter and singer) =

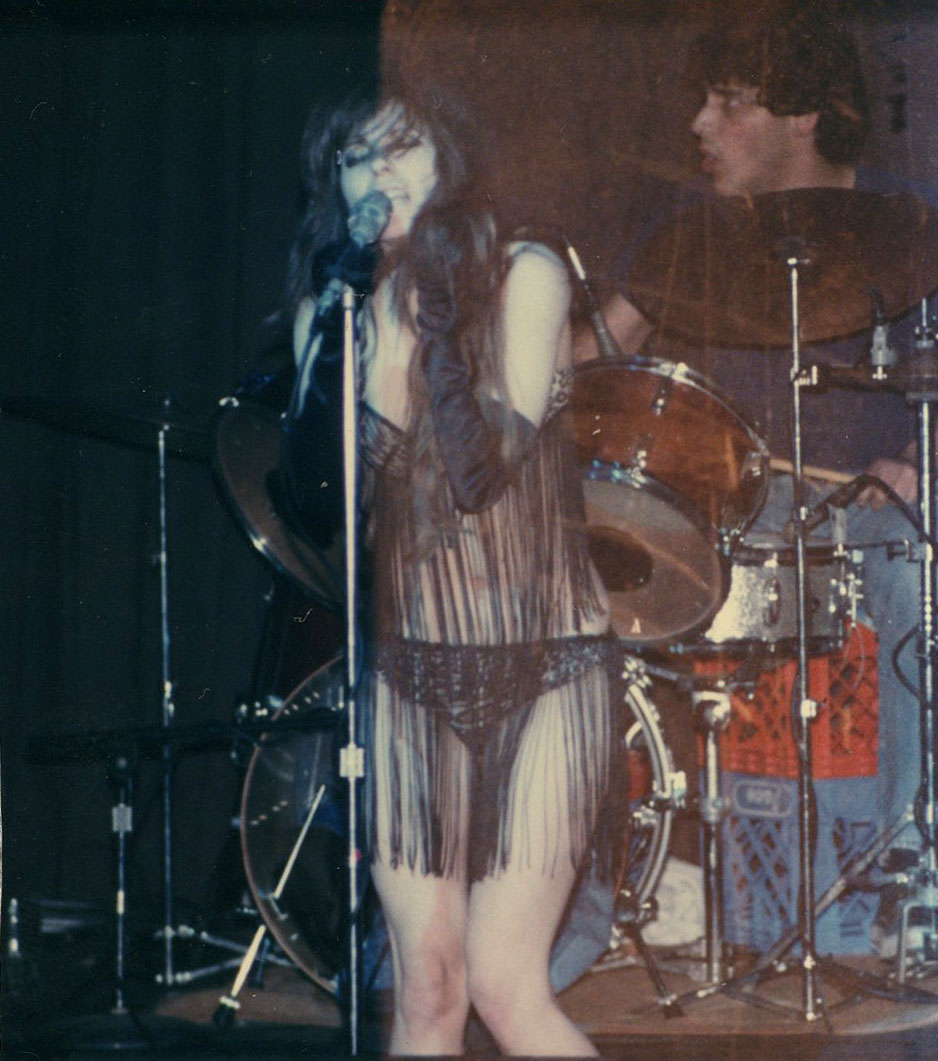
- With Destroy All Monsters, Ann Arbor, Michigan, USA, spring 1982

Background information
- Born: Detroit, Michigan, United States
- Genre: Punk rock
- Occupations: Painter, musician

Niagara, born Lynn Rovner in Detroit, Michigan in 1955, is a painter and musician. She was the lead vocalist of the proto-punk rock bands Destroy All Monsters (DAM) and Dark Carnival. Her painting derives principally from the Lowbrow art movement.

== Career ==
At the University of Michigan, Niagara founded Destroy All Monsters in 1974 with fellow art students Mike Kelley and Jim Shaw and Filmmaker Cary Loren. DAM remained active until 1985, with former members of The Stooges and the MC5 on board. Niagara soon after fronted the group Dark Carnival (with guitarist Ron Asheton and drummer Scott Asheton—both recruited from The Stooges). In 2004, Classic Rock and Rock & Folk magazines named Niagara one of the "100 Greatest Front Men." She was also one of two centrefolds for Punk Magazine along with Debbie Harry. In 2014, Niagara was the inspiration for a project in March 2014 British Vogue, Cause Célèbre, produced by Kate Moss in which model Daria Werbowy stands in for Niagara.

== Visual Art ==
Niagara paints with acrylic on canvas. With her use of bright colors, caricature portrayal of figures, and comic strip inclusion of words spoken by the figures, Niagara's style can loosely be described as Pop Art. The cartoon and comic panel style was famously utilized by painter Roy Lichtenstein, also a touchstone for her work. Her early 1970s work with collage, Xerox prints, and promotional materials for Destroy All Monsters influenced her later painting style; the bold, figurative images are evidence of that. The "lowbrow" aesthetic epitomized by the painter Robert Williams, which evolved in Southern California in the 1970s, also influenced her.

Aside from overt Pop Art stylistic tropes, Niagara also incorporates influences of the Pre-Raphaelite movement, which with some friction honored both Romanticism and Realism and depicted strong if not tragic women such as the famous Ophelia by Millais, or The Blue Bower by Rossetti. She also took cues from the Decadent movement, which was in turn influenced by Gothic fiction. Art Nouveau imprints her work with its swirling, floral-inspired, whiplash lines and the belle époque women of Toulouse-Lautrec. As a child, Niagara was enamored of John R. Neill who illustrated works by L. Frank Baum and others.

Niagara told Swindle magazine,

The first art style that I identified with was Art Nouveau. Then I discovered Decadent Art (1850s-era England), the Pre-Raphaelite movement: haunted, pale, druggy women. I read constantly. I was deep into Dostoyevsky and Dickens. Colette. The best are the writers that can turn a phrase devastatingly funny. The witticisms and bon mots of Oscar Wilde, Mark Twain, Truman Capote, Tennessee Williams, Dorothy Parker. Andy Warhol was a riot. That's probably why I have captions in my paintings. I want the women in my paintings to speak.

== Music ==
=== Destroy All Monsters ===
Destroy All Monsters was a band started in 1974 by University of Michigan art students Niagara on vocals; Mike Kelley on drums and vocals; Jim Shaw on vocals and squeeze toys; and Cary Loren on guitar and vocals. This proto-noise-band was the first pure noise-band according to music historian and Sonic Youth band member, Thurston Moore, who said, "I can find no earlier example of such primitive playing with the use of non-instruments." In 1994, drawing from early rehearsal and performance tapes, Moore released a three disc box set of these seminal basement recordings, "DAM 1974-1976" on his music label Ecstatic Peace. The original line up of musicians was not around long. In 1977, Niagara met ex-Stooges guitarist Ron Asheton, and he became her paramour. Ron thought the band's music had potential. To realize that potential, he recruited Michael Davis (ex-MC5 bassist), a real powerhouse crucial for rock bottom percussive bass. Davis, recently released from prison, was available and agreed to be part of the band. Next hired was Rob King on drums. King's drums were precise, fast and powerful, an unusual combination. Next the Miller brothers were added, Ben on saxophone, and Larry on guitar, both accomplished musicians with a punk-jazz pedigree.

The local media, including the Detroit Free Press, and The Detroit News attended early shows and gave prominent coverage to the "events," as the press referred to them. Lester Bangs wrote about "Destroy All Monsters" affectionately in CREEM magazine . Even Rolling Stone took notice with articles and interviews about the new punk phenomenon, "Niagara is strange on stage, almost like she was awakened from a deep slumber and is surprised to find herself on stage." Spin Magazine described Niagara's stage presence as, "A thrift store Nico in a bloody gown." Accounts of Niagara falling off stage were numerous. Yet, Niagara seemed blessed with nine lives, and someone always caught her, including the MC5's Rob Tyner at the Kramer Theater, "I saved Niagara's life!"

After a brief European tour four singles were produced in this early Punk era: "Bored," "You're Gonna Die," "What Do I Get?" and "Nobody Knows." The Monsters soon hooked up with the Ramones and The Dead Boys. The band members became fast friends and touring buddies. When in New York, The Dead Boys or Ramones would open, In Cleveland or Detroit, DAM got top billing. This led to many famous pairings with shows at Max's Kansas City and CBGB's in New York, The Agora Ballroom in Cleveland, Bookies in Detroit and Second Chance in Ann Arbor. The punk incarnation of the band lasted from 1977 to 1985.

=== Dark Carnival ===
In 1984, Niagara met Detroit music promoter and impresario Colonel Galaxy. The Colonel's ambitious project, Dark Carnival, had the original concept of a performance art troop that borrowed heavily from the Stooges, MC5, Velvet Underground blueprint. The Colonel found that with one player from each of a dozen Detroit punk bands he could create a "super group" and control them, (much like Colonel Tom Parker did with Elvis, hence his moniker, "The Colonel"). Bootsey X from the Lovemasters was the first member signed, then Mark Norton from the RamRods, Gary Adams from The Cubes, Mike McFeaters from What Jane Shared, Jerry Vile from The Boners, Sarana VerLin from Natasha, Greasy Carlisi from Motor City Bad Boys, Robert Gordon and Art Lyzak from The Mutants, Joe Hayden from Bugs Bedow, Pete Bankert from Weapons, Larry Steel from The Cult Heroes.

Later Dark Carnival saw some turnover, with the "big" names signing on: Niagara from Destroy All Monsters, Ron and Scott Asheton from the Stooges, Cheetah Chrome from the Dead Boys, Jim Carroll even came in from New York.

Niagara fell for the Colonel and they got married in 1986. The revolving Vaudeville-like assembly evolved into a battle-hardened, proto-punk outfit, which included Niagara, Ron Asheton, Scott Asheton, and Greasy Carlisi. This band toured the US, Canada, and Australia twice between the years 1984-2000. John Holmstrom of Punk Magazine says, "Dark Carnival produced some of the best pure Punk music I've ever heard and did it longer than anyone, Niagara's been singing for 20 years and still looks exactly the same!"

=== The Hitmen ===
When Niagara and Dark Carnival toured Australia in 1991 she befriended members of Dark Carnival's infamous opening band, The Hitmen. Based in Sydney Australia, The Hitmen were fixtures of the Australian musical landscape. Their elite membership read like a Who's Who in the Australian punk rock community. With members such as Deniz Tek from Radio Birdman, The New Christs, and Screaming Tribesmen, The Hitmen knew well the elusive Detroit sound Niagara was after. Other members of The Hitmen included world-famous guitarist Chris Masuak, Tony Jukic on rhythm guitar, Tony Robertson on bass, and Murray Shepherd on drums. Murray's brother Brad Shepherd, lead guitarist of the Hoodoo Gurus, also played on the tour's final show.

== Art career ==
Niagara applied her art school experience to create album and promotional art for early Destroy All Monsters performances. Combining an illustrator's hand with some collage and pop iconography Niagara collaborated with the others using a then cutting-edge Xerox printer to create the first Proto-Punk gig flyers. These flyers utilized found image collage with ironic and humorous intent. Niagara's style began to take shape in earnest during the later DAM incarnation with Ron Asheton, creating flyers and album art and by the early 1990s she began to show paintings in small exhibits and cafes around the Detroit area.

In 1996, Niagara teamed up with the Royal Oak, Michigan art space ©POP Gallery. Her first exhibits All Men Are Cremated Equal (1996) and Faster Niagara, Kill ... Kill (1997) were breakout shows, which garnered her regional praise. Soon art periodicals such as Juxtapoz heralded her as "The Queen Of Detroit" and many successful exhibits would follow in other cities like Los Angeles, New York, San Francisco, Sydney, Paris, Manchester UK, and Tokyo.

In 2004, ©POP invited her to curate a show entitled The Funhouse Art Show, which featured work by her music business associates Iggy Pop, Ron and Scott Asheton, Lou Reed, and others. That same year, she published Beyond the Pale, an autobiographical review of her career.

In 2006 Niagara had her first UK exhibition at Richard Goodall Gallery in Manchester England. Niagara premiered a full clothing line with the avant-garde couturier Hysteric Glamour to coincide with her opening in Tokyo in 2007. Also unveiled in 2008 was Niagara's collaboration with Vans. The result was Vans Vault series that featured seven unique styles of popular urban footwear based on Niagara designs which debuted in Paris 2008. Niagara returned to Richard Goodall Gallery in 2008 for The Good, The Bad, & The Beautiful. Outré Gallery in Australia also produced a set of Niagara silk-screened limited edition prints to coincide with Niagara's sold out shows in Sydney and Melbourne in 2008. In 2009 Niagara took the stage full-time with Dark Carnival tours in Australia, Europe, and United States.

In 2007, Rick Manore, co-founder of ©POP, said of Niagara, "She's as big as Bill Murray in Japan right now. Thousands of goth Lolitas in Tokyo alone are wearing her face, artwork and photos all over themselves, thanks to her deal with the fashion house, Hysteric Glamour. Last year, she circumnavigated the Pacific rim with exhibits in San Francisco and Sydney."

Return of the Repressed: Destroy All Monsters 1973-1977, a retrospective DAM exhibition curated by Mike Kelley and Dan Nadel, featured the singular and collaborative work of Mike Kelley, Jim Shaw, Carey Loren and Niagara. The show opened at PRISM in Los Angeles on November 19, 2011 and ran through January 7, 2012. A catalog published by PRISM and PictureBox, edited by Mike Kelley and Dan Nadel with an essay by Nicole Rudick accompanied the exhibition.

In July 2012, Niagara exhibited her first Detroit show in 6 years, War Paint at Re:View Contemporary Gallery. In 2014 Niagara was the inspiration for a project in March 2014 British Vogue, Cause Célèbre, produced by Kate Moss in which model Daria Werbowy stands in for Niagara.

== Exhibitions ==
- NIAGARA; Industry; Pontiac, Michigan; 1990
- ALL MEN ARE CREMATED EQUAL; ©POP Gallery; Detroit Michigan; 1996
- FASTER NIAGARA, KILL ... KILL; ©POP Gallery; Detroit Michigan; 1997
- IT'S MY PARTY AND I'LL DIE IF I WANT TO; ©POP Gallery; Detroit Michigan; 1998
- THE GOOD, THE BAD AND THE BEAUTIFUL(America); Roq La Rue Gallery; Seattle, WA; November 1999
- THE GOOD, THE BAD, AND THE BEAUTIFUL (Canada); ©POP Gallery; Toronto, Canada; 2000
- PSYCHO POP 101; Altered Image Gallery; Cleveland, OH; February 2000
- THE GOOD, THE BAD + THE BEAUTIFUL; Conner Contemporary Art; Washington, DC; September 2001
- JUXTAPOZ 8TH ANNIVERSARY; Track 16; Santa Monica, CA; October, 2002
- NIAGARA-SHUT UP AND POUR; Orbit Gallery; Edgewater, New Jersey; June 2004
- NIAGARA; The Candy Store; San Francisco, California; April 3, 2004
- TEN WOMEN ARTISTS FROM THE BOOK: VICIOUS, DELICIOUS, AMBITIOUS; ©POP Gallery; Detroit, Michigan; March 6, 2004
- JUXTAPOZ TENTH ANNIVERSARY SHOW; Minna Gallery; San Francisco, California
- PALM SPRINGS GROUP SHOW; M Modern Gallery; Palm Springs, Florida; February 14, 2004
- NIAGARA/ANTHONY AUSGANG; Copro Nason Gallery; Los Angeles, California; February 14, 2004
- FUN HOUSE ART SHOW; ©POP Gallery; Detroit, Michigan; February 7, 2004
- LE PETIT SERIES DE PENTURE D'OPIUM; River's Edge Gallery; Wyandotte, Michigan; October 15, 2004
- GROUP SHOW; M Modern Gallery; Palm Springs, FL; January 8, 2005
- NIAGARA; Shooting Gallery; 839 Larkin St, San Francisco, CA; April 9 - May 7, 2005
- GROUP SHOW; Mendenhall-Sobieski Gallery; 40 Mills Place, Pasadena, California; April 2 - May 4, 2005
- THE SILVER OPIUM SERIES; ©POP Gallery; 4160 Woodward Avenue, Detroit, Michigan, 2005
- NIAGARA From Detroit With Love; Outré Gallery; Sydney, Australia; January 28, 2006
- NIAGARA From Detroit With Love; Outré Gallery; Melbourne, Australia; January 21, 2006
- NIAGARA; Hysteric Glamour; Tokyo; March 16, 2006
- BACK FROM OZ; Rivers Edge Gallery; 2024 Biddle Ave, Wyandotte, Michigan 48192; February 25, 2006
- THE BIG SHOW; Silas Marder Gallery; Bridgehampton, New York; May 20, 2006 - January 15, 2007
- GET OUTA MY LINE OF FIRE; Richard Goodall Gallery; 59 Thomas St, Manchester, England; June 23 - July 22, 2006
- NIAGARA ... HARDBOILED SURREALISM; Fifty 50 Gallery; 1017 W Lake Street Chicago, IL; January 12 - February 20, 2007
- NIAGARA AT SHOOTING GALLERY; The Shooting Gallery; 839 Larkin St, San Francisco, CA; April 7, 2007
- NIAGARA AT HYSTERIC GLAMOUR; Hysteric Glamour; Tokyo; April 13, 2007
- LUNACY SERIES; River's Edge Gallery; Wyandotte, MICHIGAN; October 20-December 20, 2006
- SAINTS PRESERVE US; ©POP GALLERY; Detroit, Michigan; November 18 - December 18, 2006
- DOPE SHOW; CORKTOWN TAVERN; Detroit, Michigan; November 18, 2006
- NIAGARA; ART BASEL—Miami Convention Center, Pop Art Gallery; December 12, 2006 - January 12, 2007
- VANS SHOES RELEASE PARTY; Billy Shire Fine Art; 5790 Washington Blvd Culver City, CA; June 7, 2008
- NIAGARA; HTML Gallery; 22 E 72nd street suite 2a, New York NY; Wednesday June 16, 2008
- From Detroit with A Bullet; Richard Goodall Gallery; Manchester, England; September 20, 2008
- Vans Shoe Launch; Lazy Dog Gallery; Paris, France; October 2 and 3, 2008
- NIAGARA PHOBIA; Inside/Out Gallery; Traverse City, Michigan; Friday, July 30, 2010
- LET'S GET INTO TROUBLE; PINK PUMP; 309 S. Main (between Third & Fourth Street), Royal Oak, Michigan 48067; June 23, 2011
- RETURN OF THE REPRESSED: DESTROY ALL MONSTERS, 1973-1977; Prism Gallery; West Hollywood, California; November 2011 - January 2012
- WAR PAINT; Re:View Contemporary; Detroit, Michigan; July 14 – August 4, 2012

== Bibliography ==
- Niagara: Beyond The Pale (9mm Books 2005) ISBN 0-9766325-8-6
- Pop Surrealism by Kirsten Anderson, Artist Anthology (Last Gasp, 2004) ISBN 978-0-86719-618-4
- Vicious, Delicious and Ambitious: 20th Century Artists, Sherri Cullison (Schiffer Publishing, 2002) ISBN 0-7643-1634-6
- Return of the Repressed: Destroy All Monsters 1973-1977 Nicole Rudick, Mike Kelley, Daniel Nadel (Picturebox 2011) ISBN 978-0-9837199-0-8, ISBN 0-9837199-0-X
- Carnivora: The Dark Art Of The Automobile Les Barany (Barany Books/Scapegoat 2007) ISBN 978-0-9795132-1-3
- Hello Kitty Hello Art! by Roger Gastman, LTD. Sanrio Company ( Harry N. Abrams 2012) ISBN 978-1-4197-0453-6
- Great Female Artists of Detroit by Suzanne Bilek The History Press (2012) ISBN 1-60949-671-X
