= Bootstrappers =

Bootstrappers may refer to:

- Bootstrappers (band), an American band
- Bootstrappers (album), their first album
