= Jan Kotik =

Jan Kotik may refer to:

- Jan Jakub Kotík (1972–2007), Czech artist and rock drummer
- Jan Kotik (artist) (1916–2002), Czech artist active in the 1940s
