= Gi=Go =

GI=Go

Studio album by The Bootstrappers
- Released: 1992
- Recorded: 1992
- Genre: Pop/Rock, Improvised music
- Label: Atonal Records

The Bootstrappers chronology
Bootstrappers (1989)	GI=Go (1992)

GI=Go is the second album of the trio The Bootstrappers.

== Track list ==
1. Optimize My Hard Disk, Baby
2. Command Z
3. RTFM
4. System Crash
5. Garbage In, Garbage Out
6. Zero Divide
7. Heapfix
8. Meat Companion
9. 8-Bit Living

== Personnel ==
- Elliott Sharp: Guitar
- Thom Kotik: Bass
- Jan Jakub Kotík: Drums
