= C-Pop (gallery) =

Art gallery in Detroit, Michigan

Coordinates: 42°21′05.9″N 83°03′37.1″W

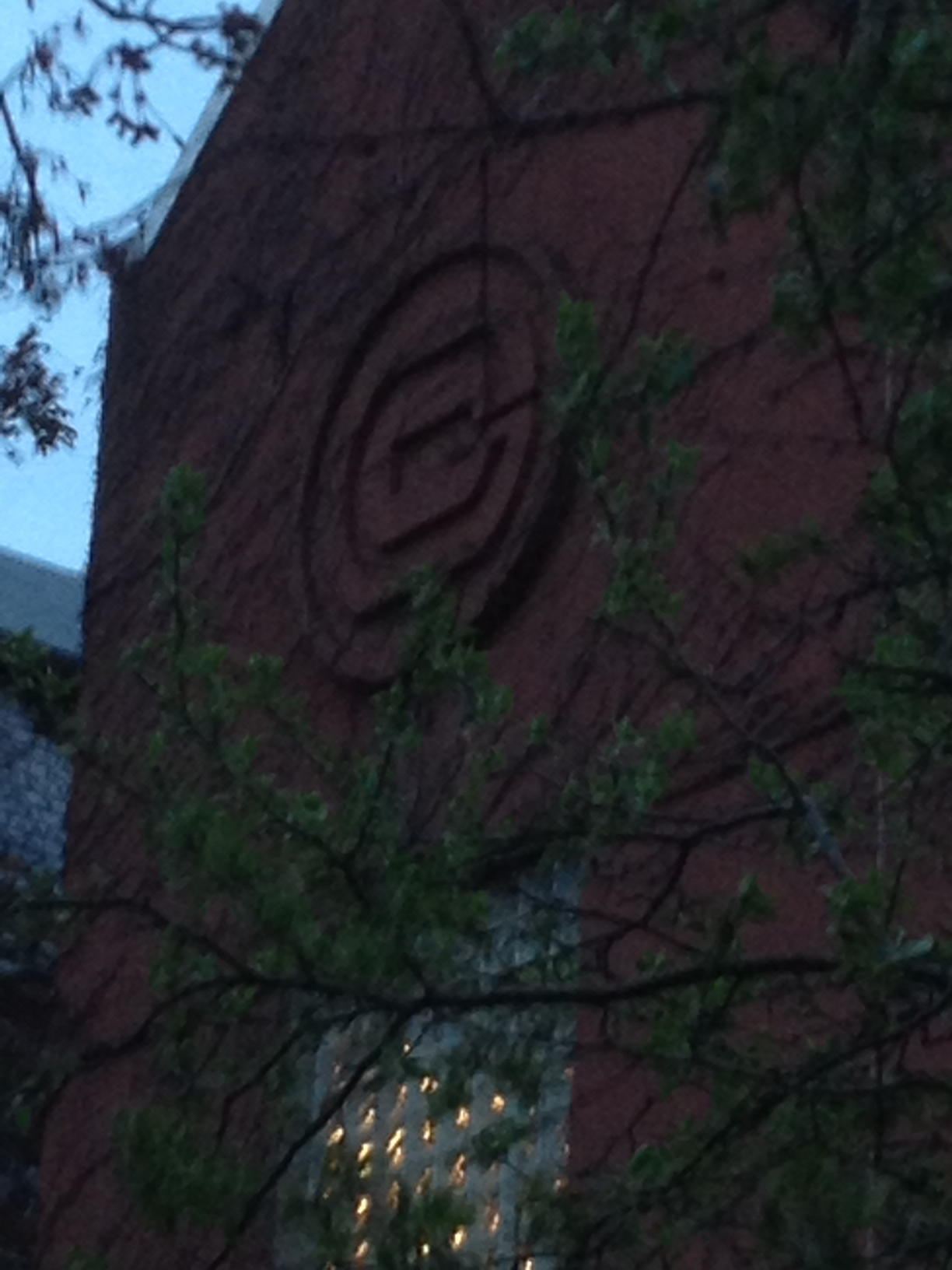
Image of the rear outside wall of the former site of C-Pop Gallery at 4160 Woodward, Detroit, Michigan as of April 20, 2016

C-Pop Gallery (sometimes stylized as "(C)-Pop" or "©-Pop") was a metro Detroit art gallery that operated from 1996 to 2009.

== History ==
C-Pop was originally opened in March 1996 by Rick Manore with partners Michael Lask and Marty Geramita in the basement of a former church at 515 S. Lafayette in Royal Oak with a significant initial emphasis on rock posters, but was also associated with and moved towards a focus on less mass-produced art, including the Lowbrow art movement. The first exhibit in the space was for Robert Williams in May 1996. The gallery later moved to the David Whitney Building (Suite 313) in Detroit before finally opening in its final location at 4160 Woodward (the former Detroit Bowling & Trophy, in the same block as the Majestic Theater) in September 1999, with a notable sign created by Alex Porbe and significant renovations to the space funded by artist and eventual gallery owner Tom Thewes (son of Compuware co-founder Thomas Thewes). The physical gallery closed in the summer of 2009.

== Exhibitions ==
Amongst the many artists who exhibited at C-Pop were Niagara, Glenn Barr, Mark Dancey, Robert Williams, Shag, and Shepard Fairey The following is an incomplete listing of C-Pop exhibits:

- Robert Williams May 17–June 23, 1996
- Fiction Burn – Glenn Barr 1996
- All Men are Cremated Equal – Niagara November 1996
- The Art of Derek Hess March 21, 1997
- Blinkless Eyes and Fresh Fruit Pies, The Art of the Residents and Steven Cerio May 3, 1997
- Good to the Last Drop – Mark Dancey October 4, 1997
- Nocturnal Planet – Glenn Barr November 22, 1997
- Faster Niagara, Kill... Kill 1997
- Carne d'Amour / Carne De Amore (Group Show) February 6, 1998 (sometimes references as Carne d'More
- Is Schism – Parlangeli Bill Brovold May 2–31, 1998 (final Royal Oak show)
- It's My Party and I'll Die If I Want To – Niagara November 14, 1998
- C Stands For..... (group show) September 25, 1999
- Why Walk When You Can Drive (group) 1999
- Strangers Have the Best Candy (group) 1999
- Underbelly – Glenn Barr December 11, 1999 – January 14, 2000
- Cat Scratch Derek – Derek Hess June 3, 2000 (with Glenn Barr "Barcode"?)
- Crime Lines – Niagara October 7, 2000
- Cortex of Desire – Glenn Barr and David Sandlin December 2, 2000
- The Leisure Principle – Shag / Allegories: The Fall of Virtue – Isabella Samaras / Hoods & Heaters Pulp Illustrations September 7, 2002
- Tight as a Tourniquet – Derek Hess / Superhero Group Show October 5, 2002
- They Won't Let Me Be Good – Niagara April 5, 2003
- Flying Circus The Graphic Energy and Inspired Illuminations of Mark Dancey December 6–30, 2003
- Fun House Art Show The Visual Art of Iggy Pop, Ron Asheton & Scott Asheton plus related group show February 7, 2004
- TEN WOMEN ARTISTS FROM THE BOOK: VICIOUS, DELICIOUS, AMBITIOUS; March 6, 2004
- The Silver Opium Series – Niagara November 2005
- Incidental Contact (group show) May 1, 2006
- Obey With Caution The Phenomenology of Shepard Fairey November 1, 2006
- Saints Preserve Us (group show) November 18 – December 18, 2006
- It’s All About © (group show; apparently referred to at times as "The End Is Near") May 1–June 13, 2009 (Final show)

== Music ==
C-Pop hosted various musical acts in its space as well in a limited fashion, including Jack White, the Demolition Doll Rods, and the Time Stereo Noise Camp.
