= The Coachmen =

American band

The Coachmen were an American lower-Manhattan punk rock/no wave band that performed from early 1978 to their final gig at White Columns in August, 1980. The line-up included guitarists Thurston Moore and J. D. King, bassist Bob Pullin, and Danny Walworth on drums, who was replaced by Dave Keay (ex-Harry Toledo). Briefly, Mary Lemley was vocalist. The Coachmen was Moore's first band; their live performances were his first times performing in N.Y.C. clubs in an artistic milieu.

They played at CBGB, Max's Kansas City, Tier 3, A's (curated by Arleen Schloss), The Botany Talk House, The 80's, S.N.A.F.U., and loft parties thrown by Jenny Holzer. Moore suggested on the WTF with Marc Maron podcast that David Byrne (Talking Heads) was at the band's first ever public performance.

Their penultimate performance was at Giorgio Gomelsky's N.Y.C. loft. It was there that Thurston Moore met Kim Gordon.

Some simpatico bands The Coachmen were billed with were The Green Scene, Paul McMahon's A Band, Phoebe Legere's Monad, Harry Toledo, and the Fluks, a band that included guitarist Lee Ranaldo who would wind up in Sonic Youth with Moore.

A demo tape of material from those days was released in all three formats on New Alliance in 1988 and titled, Failure to Thrive.

Shortly after The Coachmen's breakup Moore went on to form Sonic Youth along with his girlfriend, bassist Kim Gordon.

J. D. King began an award-winning illustration career and restarted the band with new members in 1997, putting out two recordings on Moore's Ecstatic Peace! label: Ten Compositions: New Frontiers in Free Rock in 2000 and American Mercury in 2006. The latter was reviewed favorably online in Next Big Thing and Blog to Comm and in print in Wire No. 276, February, 2007. American Mercury also got a fair amount of alternative radio airplay, including on WFMU.

The band is now known as J. D. King & The Coachmen, renamed to differentiate it from other bands, old and current, with the same name. The band name was King's idea, an ironic homage to a typical 1960s garage-rock band name.

Dave Keay is the drummer for the avant-rock band The Day Care Centre. Their double LP, A Jumpin' Jackpot of Melody, was released in 2007.
