= Even So (EP) =

EP by Slovenly
- Released: 1984
- Genre: Post-punk, indie rock
- Length: 12:32
- Label: New Alliance Records
- Producer: Richard Masci, Slovenly

Slovenly chronology
Even So (1984)	After the Original Style (1984)

Professional ratings
Review scores
Source	Rating
Allmusic	4/5 stars

Even So is an EP by Slovenly, released on 1984 through New Alliance Records.

== Track listing ==
All tracks are written by Slovenly.

Side one
No.	Title	Length
1.	"Even So"	3:42

Side two
No.	Title	Length
1.	"Sic/Think"	2:53
2.	"Temp. Struct."	2:43
3.	"Today or Ck"	3:14

== Personnel ==
Slovenly

- Steve Anderson – vocals
- Rob Holtzman – drums
- Lynn Johnston – saxophone
- Tim Plowman – keyboards
- Tom Watson – guitar, bass guitar
- Scott Ziegler – guitar, bass guitar

Production and additional personnel

- Richard Masci – production
- Peter Slovenly – production
