= We Shoot for the Moon =

Studio album by Slovenly
- Released: 1989
- Recorded: July, 1988 at Lyceum Sound, Los Angeles, California
- Genre: Post-punk, art rock
- Length: 59:48
- Label: SST (209)
- Producer: Vitus Mataré, Slovenly

Slovenly chronology
Riposte (1987)	We Shoot for the Moon (1989)	Highway to Hanno's (1992)

Professional ratings
Review scores
Source	Rating
Allmusic	2.5/5 stars

We Shoot for the Moon is the fourth album by Slovenly, released in 1989 through SST Records.

== Track listing ==
All tracks are written by Slovenly, except "Don't Cry No Tears" by Neil Young and "A Year With No Head" by Martin Bramah and Rick Goldstraw.

No.	Title	Length
1.	"Running for Public Office"	3:56
2.	"Self Pity Song"	3:29
3.	"Don't Cry No Tears"	2:24
4.	"Talking"	2:06
5.	"What's It Called"	3:04
6.	"You Cease to Amaze Me"	2:15
7.	"We Shoot for the Moon"	3:50
8.	"A Year With No Head"	3:01
9.	"Spy Surf"	3:00
10.	"No Unlawful Sex"	2:20
11.	"She Was Bananas"	3:46
12.	"A Warm Night"	3:20
13.	"Hellectro"	3:35
14.	"Things Fall Apart"	19:42

== Personnel ==
Slovenly

- Steve Anderson – vocals
- Rob Holtzman – drums
- Lynn Johnston – horns
- Tim Plowman – guitar, keyboards
- Tom Watson – guitar, bass guitar
- Scott Ziegler – guitar, bass guitar

Production and additional personnel

- Guy Bennett – Trombone
- Jacob Cohn – Alto Saxophone
- Vitus Mataré – production, engineering, keyboards, maracas
- Slovenly – production, engineering
