= Highway to Hanno's =

Studio album by Slovenly
- Released: July 1992
- Recorded: Summer 1991 at Brilliant Studios, San Francisco, California
- Genre: Post-punk, indie rock
- Length: 37:58
- Label: SST (287)
- Producer: Norman Kerner, Slovenly

Slovenly chronology
We Shoot for the Moon (1989)	Highway to Hanno's (1992)

Professional ratings
Review scores
Source	Rating
AllMusic	2/5 stars
Q	3/5 stars

Highway to Hanno's is the fifth album by Slovenly, released in 1992 through SST Records. It was the band's final album.

== Critical reception ==
Perfect Sound Forever called Highway to Hano's "one of the last truly great albums released on the SST label."

== Track listing ==
All tracks are written by Slovenly.

No.	Title	Length
1.	"Comes Alive"	3:09
2.	"Pig Farmers Daughter"	3:40
3.	"To Tito With Love"	2:49
4.	"Hamster Wheel"	3:04
5.	"Instability"	3:34
6.	"Crawl Inside"	2:48
7.	"Muddy Puddle"	2:24
8.	"Smarm Pop"	2:26
9.	"Carnival Knowledge"	1:16
10.	"Benny's Jam"	2:22
11.	"Sleep From the Eye"	2:10
12.	"Thank You Purple Jesus"	1:58
13.	"Blood Revealed"	2:55
14.	"Vision Head"	2:23

== Personnel ==
Slovenly

- Steve Anderson – vocals
- Rob Holtzman – drums
- Lynn Johnston – saxophone
- Tim Plowman – guitar
- Tom Watson – guitar
- Scott Ziegler – guitar, bass guitar, illustrations

Production and additional personnel

- Sam Goldman – violin
- Paul Gubser – photography
- Norman Kerner – production, engineering, mixing
- Heidi Peterson – vocals on "Muddy Puddle"
- Christopher Simmersbach – percussion
- Slovenly – production
- Phil Smoot – trumpet on "Thank You Purple Jesus"
