= Thinking of Empire =

Studio album by Slovenly
- Released: 1986
- Recorded: April 1986 at Music Lab, Silver Lake, California
- Genre: Post-punk, indie rock
- Length: 39:52
- Label: SST (067)
- Producer: Slovenly, Spot

Slovenly chronology
After the Original Style (1984)	Thinking of Empire (1986)	Riposte (1987)

Professional ratings
Review scores
Source	Rating
Allmusic	4/5 stars

Thinking of Empire is the second album by Slovenly, released on 1986 through SST Records.

== Album cover ==
The cover features a painting by Paloma Díaz Abreu along with the band's and the album's name.

== Track listing ==
All tracks are written by Slovenly.

Side one
No.	Title	Length
1.	"Movement"	3:02
2.	"Give Him a Sip 'Cause His Mind's Messed Up"	2:09
3.	"Sand"	3:33
4.	"Distended"	2:58
5.	"Diminished Ideal"	3:36
6.	"This Is the Big Tree"	3:01

Side two
No.	Title	Length
1.	"Cartwheels of Glory"	2:58
2.	"At Sea"	4:18
3.	"Inattention"	3:51
4.	"Interruptions"	3:15
5.	"On the Beach"	3:45
6.	"Bleached"	3:26

== Personnel ==
Slovenly

- Steve Anderson – vocals
- Rob Holtzman – drums
- Lynn Johnston – bass clarinet, French Horn, viola
- Tim Plowman – bass guitar, guitar
- Tom Watson – guitar, bass guitar
- Scott Ziegler – guitar, bass guitar

Production and additional personnel

- Peter Slovenly – production
- Spot – production
- Andre Jackson – assistant engineer
