= After the Original Style =

Studio album by Slovenly
- Released: 1984
- Recorded: October, 1984 at Paramount Recording Studio, Hollywood, California
- Genre: Post-punk, indie rock
- Length: 40:06
- Label: New Alliance Records
- Producer: Richard Masci, Slovenly

Slovenly chronology
Even So (1984)	After the Original Style (1984)	Thinking of Empire (1986)

Professional ratings
Review scores
Source	Rating
Allmusic	2.5/5 stars

After the Original Style is the debut album of Slovenly, released on 1984 through New Alliance Records.

== Track listing ==
All tracks are written by Slovenly.

Side one
No.	Title	Length
1.	"Inhale"	4:24
2.	"No Shore"	3:03
3.	"Inside Watch"	1:51
4.	"Mecca of the American"	3:12
5.	"Yogi's Ark"	3:01
6.	"Hurry"	3:11

Side two
No.	Title	Length
1.	"Dialogue"	5:02
2.	"Squeaky Clean"	3:25
3.	"Orange Crush"	3:58
4.	"Where Are My Friends"	4:55
5.	"The New Possibility"	4:05

== Personnel ==
Slovenly

- Steve Anderson – vocals, bass guitar
- Rob Holtzman – drums
- Lynn Johnston – violin, saxophone
- Tim Plowman – keyboards, synthesizer, guitar
- Tom Watson – guitar, bass guitar
- Scott Ziegler – guitar, bass guitar

Production and additional personnel

- Garret Griffin – guitar on "Hurry" and "Squeaky Clean"
- Richard Masci – production
- Peter Slovenly – production
