= Riposte (album) =

Studio album by Slovenly
- Released: 1987
- Recorded: Spring 1987 at Lyceum Sound, Los Angeles, California
- Genre: Post-punk, indie rock
- Length: 31:15
- Label: SST (089)
- Producer: Vic Abascal

Slovenly chronology
Thinking of Empire (1986)	Riposte (1987)	We Shoot for the Moon (1989)

Professional ratings
Review scores
Source	Rating
Allmusic	3/5 stars

Riposte is the third album by Slovenly, released on 1987 through SST Records.

== Track listing ==
All tracks are written by Slovenly.

No.	Title	Length
1.	"Enormous Critics"	2:32
2.	"Myer's Dark"	3:43
3.	"Not Mobile"	3:26
4.	"As If It Always Happens"	4:05
5.	"A Little Resolve"	2:04
6.	"The Way Untruths Are"	4:19
7.	"Old/New"	3:25
8.	"On the Surface"	3:03
9.	"Prejudice"	2:24
10.	"Emma"	2:14

== Personnel ==
- Vic Abascal – production
- Steve Anderson – vocals
- Rob Holtzman – drums
- Lynn Johnston – bass clarinet, saxophone, viola
- Tim Plowman – bass guitar, guitar
- Tom Watson – guitar, bass guitar
- Scott Ziegler – guitar, bass guitar
