= Bootstrappers (album) =

Studio album by Bootstrappers
- Released: 1989
- Recorded: 1989
- Genre: Improvised music
- Length: ~52:00
- Label: New Alliance
- Producer: Elliott Sharp, Mike Watt

Bootstrappers chronology
Bootstrappers (1989)	Gi=Go (1992)

Professional ratings
Review scores
Source	Rating
Allmusic	link

Bootstrappers is the first release by the Bootstrappers, which at the time featured guitarist Elliott Sharp and the Reactionaries/Minutemen/Firehose rhythm section of bassist Mike Watt and drummer George Hurley.

On the album, Watt used a Guild Ashbory electric bass, an instrument the approximate size of a mandolin with rubber-band-like silicon strings.

After this album, bassist Mike Watt was replaced by bassist Thom Kotik and drummer George Hurley was replaced by drummer Jan Jakub Kotík.

== Track listing ==
1. The Memory Is A Muscle – 3:36
2. Spider Baby – 2:30
3. New Boots – 1:05
4. Taxista – 1:14
5. Flicker – 1:39
6. Third Rail – 2:08
7. Media Dub – 8:00
8. D-I-A-L-C-A-S-H – 4:10
9. X/Delta – 2:52
10. Their Faces Are Green and Their Hands Are Blue – 1:49
11. Presidential Apology – 4:51
12. Mud – 1:28
13. Indeed – 1:31
14. Empty-Vee – 3:39
15. Long Beach Dub/Feen – 7:04
16. Maneuvers – 4:59

All songs composed/credited to George Hurley, Elliott Sharp, and Mike Watt.

== Musical Personnel ==
- Elliott Sharp - guitar, sampler
- Mike Watt - bass
- George Hurley - drums
