= M3 (band) =

M3 was an American experimental rock group, founded by the brothers Roger Miller, Ben Miller and Larry Miller. Their name is a dual reference to the three M surnames, and also pun on the musical notation for a minor third.

All three Miller brothers are longtime fixtures on the Detroit/Ann Arbor, Michigan music scenes. M3 is a quasi-reunion of Sproton Layer, a short-lived group the Miller brothers formed in the late 1960s. Afterwards, Roger was active with several groups (notably Mission of Burma and Birdsongs of the Mesozoic), as were Ben and Larry (notably Destroy All Monsters).

M3 is primarily a studio recording and experimental project, although it has been known to play live to appreciative audiences. Critic Richard Foss describes their self-titled debut as "without a doubt some of the strangest music ever to be even vaguely classified as rock."

According to their website, in December 2011, M3 was planning to record a new studio album. It would have been their first album in over ten years. Although the band went into recording a new album, the idea was scrapped and the brothers ended the band permanently.

== Discography ==
- 1993 - M-3
- 2001 - Unearthing

=== Singles ===
- "Bailamos" (1999) No. 40 UK
