= J. D. King (artist) =

American artist and musician (1951–2025)

- Born: John David King; 3 May 1951; New York City, U.S.
- Died: October 27, 2025 (aged 74); Remsen, New York, U.S.
- Known for: Commercial art, illustration
- Notable work: Illustrations for Absolut Vodka, Atlantic Records, Sony, etc.
- Website: Official website

John David King (May 3, 1951 – October 27, 2025) was an American artist and musician, best known for his commercial art illustrations for companies including Absolut Vodka, Atlantic Records, Condé Nast Publications, Sony, and others.

== Life and career ==
J. D. King began his career in the late 1970s with contributions to underground press magazines such as Stop!, Weirdo, and Comical Funnies.

King's illustrations appeared in The Boston Globe, The New York Times, The Wall Street Journal, and The Washington Post. In addition to book illustration (Martin McIntosh's Beatsville), he contributed to numerous magazines, including Adweek, US Postal Service, Audubon magazine, BusinessWeek, Entertainment Weekly, Fortune, Women's Wear Daily, The Smithsonian magazine, New York, The New Yorker, Princeton Alumni Weekly, California magazine, and Time. Beastniks, a comic strip inspired by beatniks, ran in Drawn & Quarterly and Twist during the late 1980s and early 1990s.

J. J. Sedelmaier Productions animated King's eccentric cartoon characters for a Nick@Nite promotional film, and Curious Pictures also animated King's creations for a U.S. Cellular phone commercial.

His artwork has been displayed in awards annuals, including American Illustration, Communication Arts and the annual of the Society of Publication Designers.

King was also a guitarist. His band, J. D. King and the Coachmen, recorded Ten Compositions: New Frontiers in Free Rock and American Mercury.

King died unexpectedly at his home in Remsen, New York on October 27, 2025, at the age of 74.
