= Slovenly (band) =

American post-punk band

- Origin: Los Angeles, California, United States
- Genres: Post-punk, indie rock, art rock
- Years active: 1981–1992
- Label: SST
- Past members: Steve Anderson; Rob Holzman; Tim Plowman; Tom Watson; Scott Ziegler

Slovenly were an American post-punk band from San Francisco, California, formed in 1981. After the group disbanded, Tom Watson joined Red Krayola for their self-titled album and has continued to record with them.

== History ==
The members of Slovenly had all attended Mira Costa High School in Manhattan Beach. Steve Anderson, Scott Ziegler and drummer Bruce Losson were in a band called the Convalescence. When the bass player left, Watson joined and the band name was changed to Toxic Shock.

After graduation, they continued playing music and the initial version of Slovenly was formed. Eventually, Bruce left the band and was replaced by ex-Saccharine Trust drummer Rob Holzman.

The band played their first gig as Toxic Shock with Minutemen and Saccharine Trust which led to an invitation from the Urinals to contribute a track to the Keats Rides A Harley compilation album by Happy Squid Records. The band changed their name to Slovenly and continued to gig with Minutemen which led to releasing their first albums on Mike Watt's New Alliance Records label.

== Discography ==
Studio albums

- After the Original Style (1984, New Alliance)
- Thinking of Empire (1986, SST)
- Riposte (1987, SST)
- We Shoot for the Moon (1989, SST)
- Highway to Hanno's (1992, SST)

EPs

- Even So (1984, New Alliance)
- Plug (1986, New Alliance)
- Drive It Home, Abbernathy (1991, Ajax)
