= Michelle T. Clinton =

American poet (born 1955)

- Born: 1955 (age 70–71)
- Occupation: Poet
- Writing career
- Notable awards: American Book Award (1990)

Michelle T. Clinton (born 1955) is an American poet.

Her work appeared in Zyzzyva.

== Biography ==
Michelle T. Clinton was born in 1955 and grew up in a socio-economically challenged South Central Los Angeles family. She was based in Santa Monica, California for a period of time. Interviewed by Penelope Moffett, Clinton stated: "I don’t think the writing saved me, but I think being dedicated to the writing helped me save myself." Her family "was poor. . . . We were troubled by alcoholism, and we saw a lot of violence. We moved frequently", according to Clinton. She left Los Angeles to study political science at UC Berkeley, but returned to Los Angeles in 1981.

== Career ==
A performance artist and poet, Clinton described her work as "an attempt to assimilate the racist & sexist violence in my body. The poems struggle to answer the question: How does the individual/community survive and continue to function in the face of systematic atrocity?"

The table of contents from her book Good Sense & the Faithless give an indication of her grappling with the "racist and sexist violence in her body": such poems as "Options for Girls: Patience and Loathing", "Guidelines for Brothers: How to Heal Rape", "Another Anti-Love Poem", and "The Loneliness of Healing" are just a few of her poems that address that issue of race and sexual violence. She was quite active with the performance and literary arts scene at Beyond Baroque in Venice, CA, and Highways Performance Space in Santa Monica, CA, and led a multicultural women's poetry workshop at Beyond Baroque Literary Arts Foundation. Clinton also performed her poetry in the Los Angeles area. According to Los Angeles-based writer and graphic designer, Pam Ward, who participated in one of Clinton's poetry workshop's, Clinton "was a powerful force in the literary community during the 80s–90s".

For a time, Clinton's work centered on multiculturalism and gay and lesbian issues, although in Good Sense & the Faithless she frequently refers to the particular politics of bisexual identities, seen in such poems as "Politics of the Bisexual Deep Fry" and "We’re All Gringos on this Bus/ Ode to the Am. Butch".

Clinton was very concerned with feminist issues in her work. "Through her poems, Clinton said, she has found expression for 'a lot of emotion that there’s no place to put in the world…How do you deal with a rape that happened 10 years ago? What does it mean when you say 30% of all girls are sexually abused by the time they get out of high school? I constantly come back to issues of sexual abuse. I’m appalled, I’m outraged, outraged.'"

== Style of writing ==
Clinton uses black vernacular forms of speech as part of her aesthetic. Examples of titles: "Solitude Ain't Loneliness", "it's them flat" and uses lower-case letters to start poems at times, or writing a poem like "it's them flat" that is written in all lower-case letters, and uses & ampersands instead of the typewritten word "and", frequently, types "w/" instead of "with", occasionally using profanity in the poems.

== Literary topics and influence ==
Sexuality, gender, feminism, bisexuality, sexual violence, racism, racial bias, Los Angeles, queer identity, mental health, spirituality.

== Contributions to feminist theory ==
Through her concept of the Girl Hero from her "Manifesting the Girl Hero" poem, examples of the integration of race, gender, and sexuality in poems that represent intersectional feminism, queer studies, poems such as "Options for Girls: Patience and Loathing", "Uterus Root", "Womanist Face Aches" and more.

== Reception ==
Although Clinton disappeared from the Los Angeles creative scene in the mid-1990s, it is not hard to see the impact that her work and her presence had in the area. It is challenging to find information about her online, but she is referenced numerous times among histories of the poets of the Los Angeles literary scene of the 1980s and '90s. Clinton's performance work also was reviewed in the LA Times during that era, and she was interviewed by reporters covering the arts beat a number of times. Based on self-reports from artists active at that time in the city, it is safe to surmise that she was a key figure in the Los Angeles performance arts scene of the 1980s and 1990s.

== Awards ==
- 1990 American Book Award

== Works ==
- Good Sense & the Faithless. West End Press. 1994. ISBN 0-931122-75-9.
- Michelle T. Clinton; Sesshu Foster; Naomi Quinonez, eds. (July 1989). Invocation L.A.: Urban Multicultural Poetry. West End Press. ISBN 978-0-931122-52-1.
- High Blood/Pressure. West End Press. August 1986. ISBN 978-0-931122-41-5.

=== Anthologies ===
- Bill Mohr; Sheree Levin, eds. (1985). Poetry Loves Poetry: An Anthology of Los Angeles Poets. Momentum Press. ISBN 978-0-936054-50-6.
- A. R. Ammons; David Lehman, eds. (1994). The Best American Poetry 1994. Simon & Schuster. ISBN 978-0-671-89948-6.
- James Tate; David Lehman, eds. (1997). The Best American Poetry 1997. Simon and Schuster. ISBN 978-0-684-81452-0.
- Barbara Smith, ed. (2000). "Debra". Home girls: a Black feminist anthology. Rutgers University Press. ISBN 978-0-8135-2753-6.
- Naomi Tucker, ed. (1995). "Politics of the Bisexual Deep Fry". Bisexual politics: theories, queries, and visions. Routledge. ISBN 978-1-56023-869-0.

=== CDs ===
- Michèlle T. Clinton and Wanda Coleman: Black Angels, New Alliance Records, NAR CD 031, 1988.
- Michelle T. Clinton: Blood As A Bright Color, New Alliance Records, NAR CD 066, 1993.
