= Jan Kotík =

Czech painter

Jan Kotik
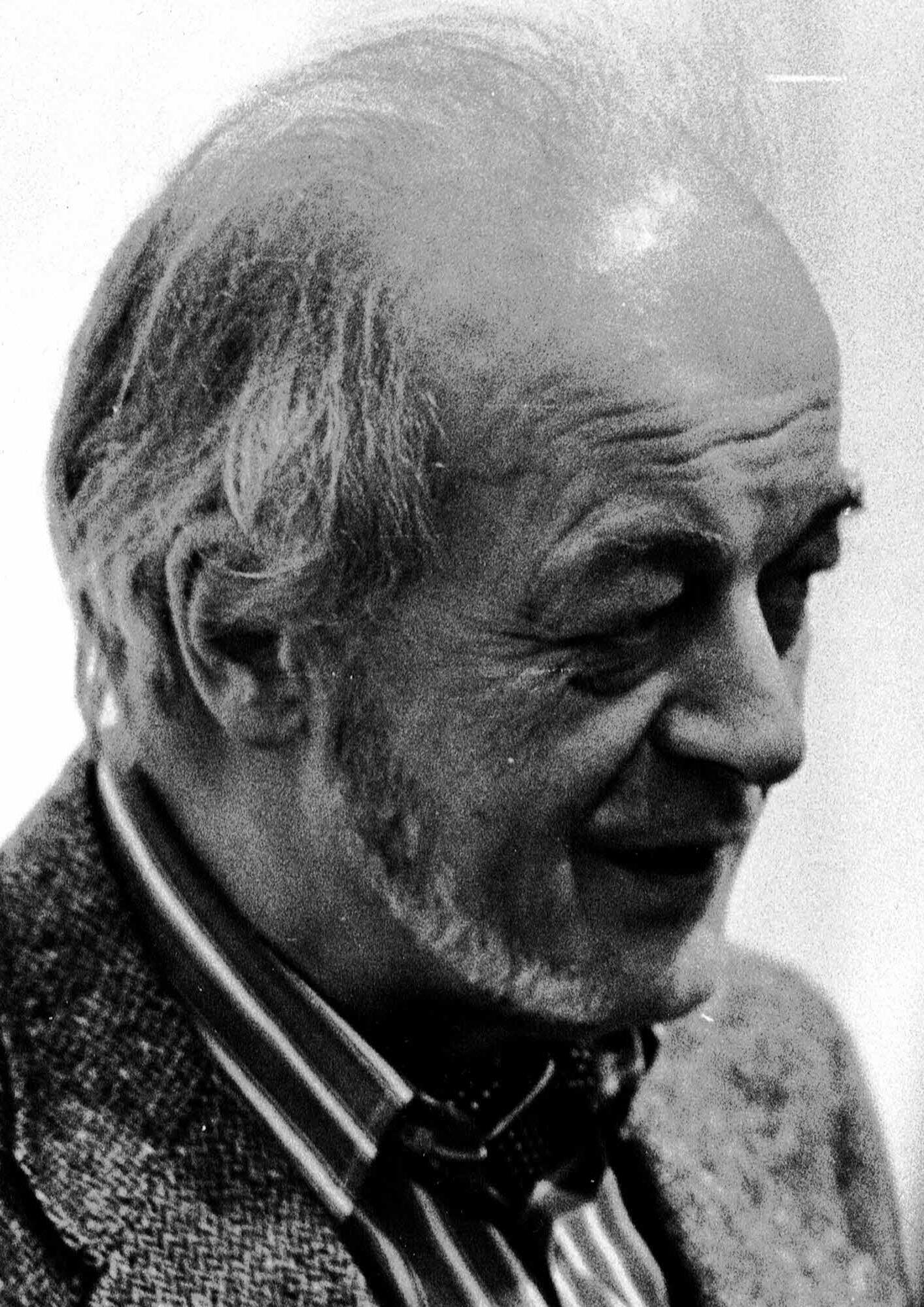
- Born: 4 January 1916; Turnov, Bohemia, Austria-Hungary
- Died: 22 March 2002 (aged 86); Berlin, Germany

Jan Kotík (4 January 1916 – 23 March 2002) was a Czech painter and graphic artist.

Kotik was a member of Group 42 during World War II. Following the war his art was influenced by Chinese calligraphy. In 1956 he attended the Congress of Alba and signed up to the Final Resolution of the Alba Congress.

His son is the musician Petr Kotík and his grandson was Jan Jakub Kotík.
