= Jim Shaw (artist) =

American painter

Jim Shaw (born in 1952) is an American artist. His work is held in the collections of the Metropolitan Museum of Art and the Museum of Modern Art, New York.

== Education ==
Shaw received his B.F.A. from University of Michigan in 1974 and his M.F.A. from the California Institute of the Arts in 1978.

== Work ==
Shaw was featured with his good friend, artist Mike Kelley, in the Michigan State University Broad Museum exhibition: "Michigan Stories: Mike Kelley and Jim Shaw,” on their shared histories with the experimental group Destroy All Monsters. Shaw was also in a band called The Poetics.

In 2002, at the Swiss Institute in New York, he exhibited the fictitious studio and paintings of the imaginary O-ist painter "Adam O. Goodman" (or "Archie Gunn").

In 2000 he showed Thrift Store Paintings—a collection of paintings by (mostly anonymous) American amateur artists—at the ICA in London. Adrian Searle of The Guardian said "The paintings are awful, indefensible, crapulous…", "these people can't draw, can't paint; these people should never be left alone with a paintbrush", and "The Thrift Store Paintings are fascinating, alarming, troubled and funny. Scary too, just like America." For Sarah Kent of Time Out: "Critics professing to be gobsmacked by these efforts can never have seen an amateur art show or walked along the railings of the Bayswater road. They should get out more."

In 2012 Rinse Cycle, a retrospective, was shown at the BALTIC Centre for Contemporary Art, in Gateshead in northern England. In 2013 the Chalet Society in Paris showed Jim Shaw: Archives, a selection of items from his collection of amateur art, junk and memorabilia; no original artwork by Shaw was shown. Shaw participated in the 55th Venice Biennale in 2013. In 2015/16 a survey exhibition, Jim Shaw: The End is Here, was exhibited at the New Museum in New York. In 2017 his show The Wig Museum was the first to be shown at the Marciano Art Foundation in Los Angeles.

== Collections ==
Shaw's work is held in the following permanent collection:

- Metropolitan Museum of Art, New York: 8 works (as of 4 October 2022)
- Museum of Modern Art, New York: 28 works (as of 4 October 2022)
