= Sproton Layer =

Sproton Layer was an American rock and roll group formed in Ann Arbor, Michigan in the late 1960s. Their music was mostly hard rock with psychedelic touches.

It was composed of bass guitarist, singer and primary songwriter Roger Miller and his younger brothers Benjamin (Ben) Miller on guitar and Laurence B. (Larry) Miller on drums. Trumpeter Harold Kirchen (brother of guitarist Bill Kirchen, a longtime member of Commander Cody and His Lost Planet Airmen) later joined the group.

Sproton Layer found local success, but earned wider attention when its personnel went on to greater success with other musical groups: Laurence and Benjamin were both members of Destroy All Monsters, and Roger had numerous musical projects, notably art-punk group Mission of Burma and silent film accompanying group Alloy Orchestra.

Sproton Layer recorded an album's worth of material shortly before breaking up in 1970; it went unreleased until 1992 when New Alliance records issued a single of "Lost Behind Words" and a full-length album, With Magnetic Fields Disrupted. The album was reissued by the German label World in Sound to much greater notice in 2011. Journalist Michael Azerrad described the recordings as a valuable document of "an amazing band that sounded like Syd Barrett fronting Cream."

The Miller brothers would later occasionally record under the name M3.

Roger and Benjamin Miller continue to records and perform under the name M2.

Sproton Layer is scheduled to perform again on June 14, 2013, at the Blind Pig in Ann Arbor.

== Discography ==
- 1991 - "Lost Behind Words", New Alliance Records
- 1992 - With Magnetic Fields Disrupted, New Alliance Records
- 2011 - With Magnetic Fields Disrupted, World in Sound Records

== See also ==
- MC5
- The Stooges
- Proto-punk
- Punk rock
- Post-punk
- Detroit rock
