= Destroy All Monsters (band) =

American rock band

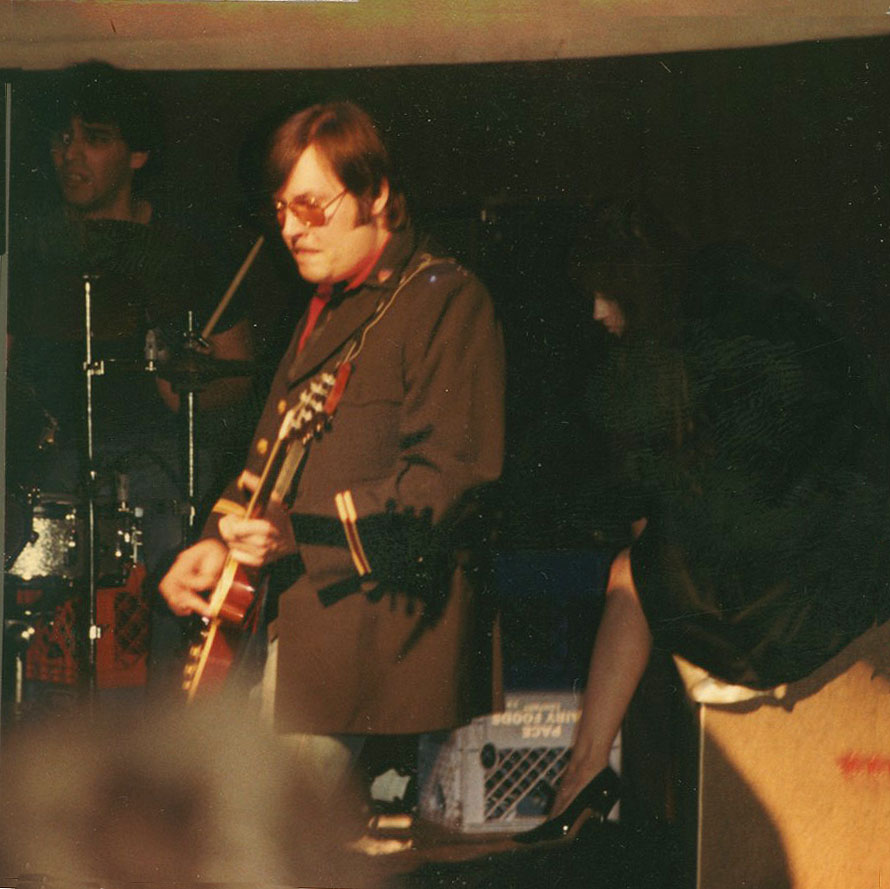
- Rob King, Ron Asheton and Niagara performing in Ann Arbor, Michigan, Spring of 1982

Background information
- Origin: Detroit, Michigan, United States
- Genres: Proto-punk; noise rock; punk rock; experimental rock; psychedelic rock; art rock
- Years active: 1973–1985
- Label: Cherry Red
- Past members: Niagara; Cary Loren; Mike Kelley; Jim Shaw; Larry Miller; Ben Miller; Mike Powers; Ron Asheton; Michael Davis; Rob King

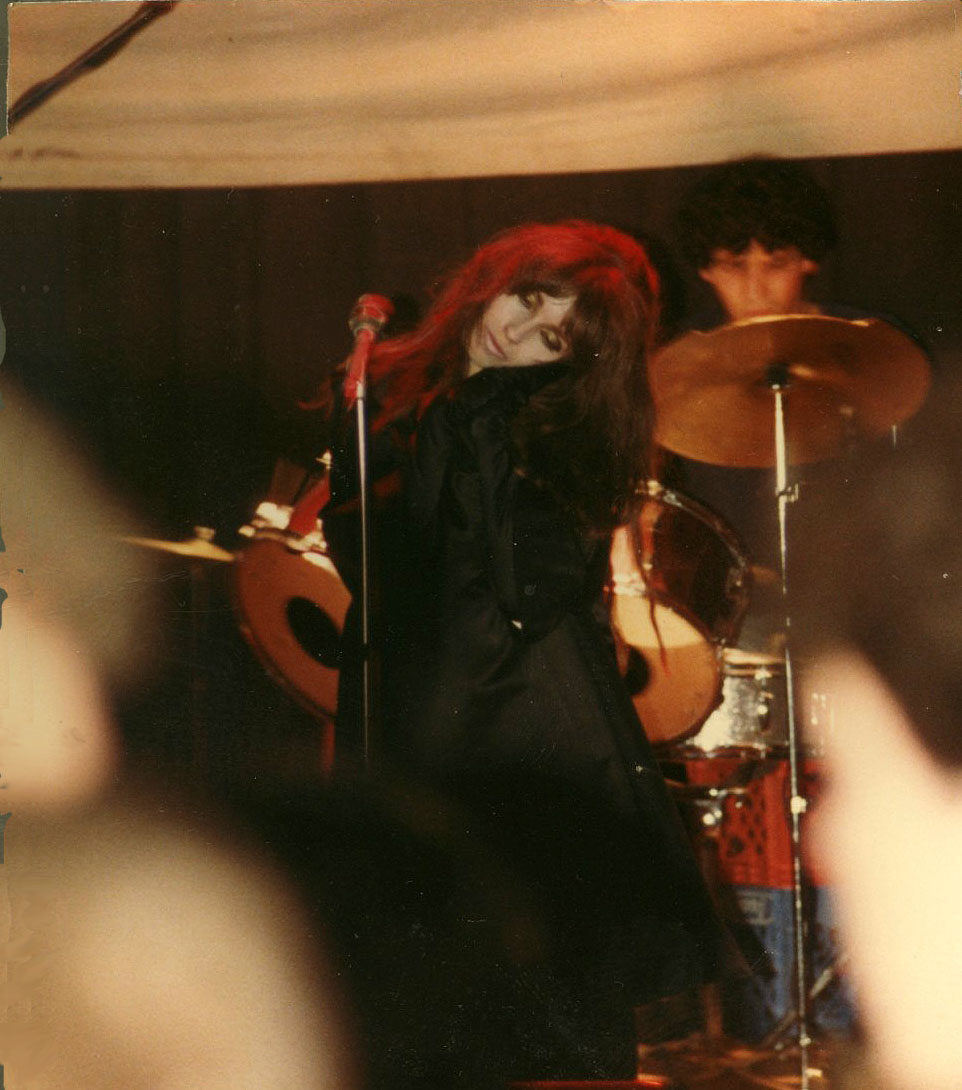
Niagara and Destroy All Monsters, Spring 1982

Destroy All Monsters was a Detroit rock band existing from 1973 to 1985, with sporadic performances since. Their music touched on elements of punk rock, psychedelic rock, heavy metal and noise rock with performance art. Their music was described by Lester Bangs as "anti-rock". Members of The Stooges and MC5 joined the band, and Sonic Youth singer/guitarist Thurston Moore participated in the compilation of a three compact disc set of the group's music in 1994, released by his Ecstatic Peace! record label.

== History ==
=== Early years ===
Formed in 1973, the first edition of Destroy All Monsters was formed by University of Michigan art students Mike Kelley, Jim Shaw, Niagara, and filmmaker Cary Loren. They performed in the Ann Arbor area from 1973–1976, and their only release was a one-hour cassette of their recordings available through Lightworks magazine. Their early music was influenced by Sun Ra, Velvet Underground, ESP-Disk, monster movies, beat culture and futurism. Their sound was experimental, abrasive, psychedelic, darkly humorous and droning.

On New Year's Eve of 1973, the first Destroy All Monsters concert was held at a comic book convention in Ann Arbor, Michigan. At the time the instruments were two guitars with an echoplex and fuzz box, a drum kit played by Mission of Burma's Roger Miller, tape loops, a violin, a sax, a vacuum cleaner and a coffee can. They performed a demented version of Black Sabbath's "Iron Man" and were asked to leave after ten minutes. The group performed "guerilla style", setting up free at parties and playing for food along Ann Arbor's frat row. They used modified instruments, a drum machine, tape loops, toys, cheap keyboards and broken electronic devices. Aside from the comic convention, the group's only formal gig in this era was at the Halloween Ball at the University of Michigan School of Art and Design in 1976.

=== New personnel ===
In 1977, Niagara and Loren recruited guitarist Larry Miller and saxophonist Ben Miller; both had been in the short-lived Sproton Layer (as drummer and guitarist respectively) with their brother Roger Miller (who later went on to co-found Mission of Burma). They invited Mike (Jett) Powers on bass but he soon left for Harvard University. Not long after, members of two important Detroit-based groups signed on: guitarist Ron Asheton, earlier of The Stooges, and bass guitarist Michael Davis of the MC5. Shortly thereafter, Ron asked drummer Rob King to join the band (replacing Roger Miller, who had filled the spot on a temp basis).

In 1978, Destroy All Monsters were preparing to release "Bored", their first official recording. Niagara by then ended her relationship with Loren in favor of a new relationship with Asheton; Loren was fired from the group. Soon after the Miller brothers also left after the DAM's Halloween show at Eastern Michigan University, in 1978. The "Bored"/"You’re Gonna Die" single earned attention in the UK music press, and a major 35 gig tour of the U.K. followed.

=== Later developments and reunion ===
Niagara and Ron Asheton continued touring and recording with Michael Davis releasing a total of four 7" singles on the IDBI label. Between 1982 and 1984, Destroy All Monsters toured nationally. Personnel: Rob King on drums, Mike Davis on bass, Ron Asheton on guitar, and Niagara on vocals. DAM made friends with the Ramones and Dead Boys during this period. The three bands would take turns opening for each other in New York, Detroit and Philadelphia shows. DAM became the house band for Second Chance (Ann Arbor) and Bookies (Detroit) during these early Punk times. In May 1983, the band recorded and videotaped a song called "Make Mine Japanese." Released in December 1983, this video can now be seen on-line. The Monsters broke up in 1985. The DAM singles were released by Cherry Red Records on CD.

In 1994, Mike Kelley, Cary Loren, Byron Coley and Thurston Moore compiled a three-CD boxed set of DAM music, artwork and liner notes as Destroy All Monsters: 1974–1976 on Moore's Ecstatic Peace! label.

The original lineup (Kelley, Loren, Niagara and Shaw) reformed for reunion shows in 1995 at the Magic Bag in Detroit, Spaceland in Los Angeles, and Bodies in San Diego. Six issues of Destroy All Monsters Magazine (1976–1979) were edited by Cary Loren and published with added DAM student artwork, flexi disc and history in the book Destroy All Monsters: Geisha This (1995). Four VHS tapes of DAM films directed by Loren were also issued between 1995-1996; Grow Live Monsters, Clear Day, Shake a LIzard Tail or Rust Belt Rump and Strange Früt: Rock Apochrypha. An exhibition of DAM artwork was shown in 1995 at the Book Beat gallery. A live CD, Silver Wedding Anniversary, resulted from the reunion concerts and was released in 1996 on the Sympathy for the Record Industry label and included performance highlights from the reunion shows.

In 1996, the group performed in Tokyo and Osaka, Japan. A display of DAM artwork was held at the Deep Gallery in Tokyo. DAM began work on the installation and film Strange Früt: Rock Apochrypha, an investigation of Detroit culture. This exhibition was first shown at "I Rip You, You Rip Me" festival, a series of exhibitions, performances, symposiums, and workshops examining the radical subculture and music scene of Detroit in the late sixties and early seventies, and was held at the Museum Boijmans Van Beuningen in Rotterdam and Nighttown, curated by artists Ben Schot and Ronald Cornelissen. Strange Früt: Rock Apochrypha was exhibited at and completed in 2000 at COCA (Center on Contemporary Art) in Seattle, WA., and at Artists Take On Detroit (2001) exhibition held at the Detroit Institute of Arts. This work was also selected for inclusion in the 2002 Whitney Biennial of Art in NYC.

In 2006, the Strange Früt exhibition and the band's archives traveled to the Magasin Center for Contemporary Art in Grenoble, France. DAM performed at the All Tomorrow's Parties festivals in Los Angeles as guest artists of Sonic Youth, and in London, UK as guest artists selected by Dino and Jake Chapman. A selection of the band's archives was on exhibition as part of the Theater Without Theater show at MACBA in Barcelona, Spain opening May 25, 2007. The exhibit traveled to Lisbon, Portugal in the fall of that year.

Since 1995, the band has released five full-length CDs on their own label(s) [The End is Here]: Radio Teardrop (1996), Backyard Monster Tube and Pig (1998), Swamp Gas (2001), and on [Compound Annex]: Detroit Oratorio (2003), Destroy All Monsters: Live in Tokyo (2003).

A reprint of the first six issues of DAM Magazine, with added band artwork, history, poster and a flexi disc was published by Book Beat and DAP Artbooks in 1995 as Destroy All Monsters: Geisha This, and reprinted in three different editions. A DVD of selected DAM films was released in 2007 by MVD video as: Grow Live Monsters featuring early 8 mm and 16 mm films directed by Cary Loren from 1971–1976.

Ron Asheton died in January 2009.

In 2009 the Printed Matter bookstore in NYC mounted the Destroy All Monsters exhibit Hungry for Death curated by James Hoff and Cary Loren featuring the group's collected work. The exhibition toured to White Flag Projects in St Louis, 0047 in Oslo, SPACE Gallery in London, The American Academy in Rome, Italy, Galerie 1m3 in Lausanne, Switzerland, AMP Gallery in Athens, Greece (2010), galerie du jour agnès b in Paris, France (2011) and the Boston University Art Gallery (2011). To coincide with the Hungry for Death exhibition Printed Matter released a 1975 recording Double Sextet as a vinyl album. The band also re-released the Destroy All Monsters: 1974–1976 compilation on CD, without booklet, in a limited edition of 1000. In 2011, the Boston University Art Gallery released the catalog Hungry for Death: Destroy All Monsters, with essays by Byron Coley and Branden Joseph. This catalog included a detailed discography and a CD titled Get Out of My Bedroom of unreleased DAM music spanning over thirty years of band history.

A facsimile reprint of the Destroy All Monsters Magazine 1976–1979 was published by Primary Information in May, 2011.

An exhibition curated by Mike Kelley and Dan Nadel titled Return of the Repressed: Destroy All Monsters 1973-1977 showing work by Mike Kelley, Jim Shaw, Cary Loren and Niagara opened at PRISM in Los Angeles on November 19, 2011 and ran through January 7, 2012. Accompanying the exhibition was a catalog published by PRISM and PictureBox, edited by Mike Kelley and Dan Nadel with an essay by Nicole Rudick.

Mike Kelley was found dead in South Pasadena, California, on February 1, 2012, aged 57, having committed suicide. Sixteen days later, on February 17, 2012, Michael Davis died of liver failure, aged 68.

Rob King died on November 4, 2023 in Ann Arbor of pneumonia at age 68.

== Discography ==
=== Albums ===
- 1975 – Greatest Hits (cassette only)
- 1995 – Destroy All Monsters 1974–1976
- 1996 – Radio Teardrop
- 1996 – Silver Wedding Anniversary
- 1998 – Pig or Backyard Monster Tube
- 2001 – Swamp Gas
- 2002 – Detroit Oratorio
- 2003 – Live in Tokyo
- 2009 – Sextet (1975, vinyl only)
- 2009 – Destroy all Monsters 1974–1976 (triple album reissue)
- 2011 – Get Out of My Bedroom!

=== Live albums ===
- 2002 – The Detroit Oratorio (live)
- 2003 – Live in Tokyo & Osaka

=== Videos ===
- 1996 – Shake a Lizard Tail or Rust Belt Rump (VHS)
- 1996 – Clear Day: DAM Live (VHS)
- 1998 – Strange Fruit (VHS)
- 2007 – Grow Live Monsters (DVD reissue from 1995 VHS)

=== Singles ===
- 1978 – "Bored"/"You’re Gonna Die"
- 1978 – Days of Diamonds EP
- 1979 – "Nov. 22"/"Meet The Creeper"
- 1979 – "What Do I Get?"/"Nobody Knows"
- 1995 – "My Cowboy Hero/ I'm Bored/ Calling All Girls" (1974)
- 1996 – "Killing Me Softly/ Detroit Rock City"
- 1997 – "Attack of the Chiggers/ Typical Girl" (1974)
- 1998 – "Paranoid of Blonds / Take Me With You"
