= Michael C. Ford =

American poet

- Born: December 13, 1939 (age 86); Chicago, Illinois, U.S.
- Occupations: Poet; teacher; recording artist; critic; playwright

Michael C. Ford (born December 13, 1939) is an American poet, playwright, editor and recording artist.

== Bio ==
Ford was born in Chicago, Illinois, United States, and moved with his parents to Pasadena, California toward the end of World War II. Between 1974 and 1977 he co-edited a prose/poetry journal called The Sunset Palms Hotel. He also edited two anthology projects The Mount Alverno (Peace Press, 1971) and Foreign Exchange (Biographies, 1979).

He was influenced by Poet Kenneth Patchen in terms of integrating the spoken words with Jazz. Ford has done collaborative recordings with members of The Doors drummer John Densmore and pianist and keyboardist Ray Manzarek. He also has done collaborative recording with Trombonist Julian Priester. His debut spoken word record Language Commando earned a Grammy nomination in 1986.

His first reading of his poetry occurred at a Fund Raiser for Norman Mailer's run for Mayor of New York in 1969 with Jim Morrison lead singer The Doors and poets Jack Hirschman, Michael McClure and several Andy Warhol "Factory workers"

== Styles and poetics ==
The motif of many of Ford's works, be it collaborative cd recordings or written poetry is that he resurrects iconic figures ranging from actresses Susan Hayward, Dorothy McGuire to legendary jazzmen such as Charlie Parker and Charles Mingus. His work conjures and preserves the ambience of woebegone days of Los Angeles, the neglected regions and landmarks from the Pacific Northwest to the shores of Lake Michigan, marking passages of time in America. Many of Ford's poetic narrations especially accompanied by former Doors drummer John Densmore would trace the roots of American music, mainly hardcore jazz. Ford’s 2014 release of spoken eleven poems album, Look Each Other in the Ears, is another collaborative project of infusing notable musicians such as from The Doors guitarist Robby Krieger, drummer John Densmore and the late keyboardist Ray Manzarek. Ford’s poems also include accompaniment of choral singers and musicians Angelo Moore, Tommy Jordan from the band Geggy Tah. This album is another one produced by Harlan Steinberger at Hen House Studio in Venice, California.

== Poetry ==
- Stuttering in the Starlight, 1970
- There's a Beast in my Garden, 1971
- Sheet Music, Anacapa Press, 1972
- Lacerations in a Broom Closet, Seeing I Press, 1974
- Lawn Swing Poems, Snowville Press, 1975
- Rounding Third, 1976
- Westpoint, Biographics, 1977
- Sleepless Night in a Soundproof Motel, Mudborn Press, 1978
- Prologue To An Interview With Leonard Cohen, Image Graphics, 1979
- Twice, 1980
- The World is a Suburb of Los Angeles, Momentum Press, 1981
- Sloe Speed, Biographics, 1984
- Ladies Above Suspicion, Illuminati, 1987
- Cottonwood Tract, Amaranth Editions, 1996
- Emergency Exits (Selected Poems 1970-1995), Amaranth Editions, 1998
- Nursery Rhyme Assassin, Inevitable Press, 2000
- To Kiss The Blood Off Our Hands, Ion Drive Publishing, 2007
- The Marilyn Monroe Concerto, Ion Drive Publishing, 2008
- The Demented Chauffeur & Other Mysteries, Ion Drive Publishing, 2009
- San Joaquin Valley Solutions (with photos by Rose Albano Risso), Ion Drive Publishing, 2012

== Plays ==
- Two American Plays, Illuminati, 1980

== Recordings ==
- Language Commando, SST, 1986
- Motel Cafe, Blue Yonder Sounds, 1988
- Fire Escapes, New Alliance Records, 1995
- The Los Angeles Bards (9 Poets Take A Swing at the National Pastime), Hen House Studios, 2002 (compilation)
- Hen House Studios Anthology Volume 2 with Jazz Fiction 2002
- Hen House Studios Anthology Volume 4 with Ray Manzarek 2004
- Hen House Studios Look Each Other in The Ears. Album includes Robbie Krieger, John Densmore, and Ray Manzarek. 2014
