= Bootstrappers (band) =

- in 2026 at Pianos in NYC

Background information
- Genre: Alternative rock

Bootstrappers was a band originally composed of guitarist Elliott Sharp, bassist Mike Watt, and drummer George Hurley. After their first album, bassist Mike Watt was replaced by bassist Thom Kotik and drummer George Hurley was replaced by drummer Jan Jakub Kotík.

== Discography ==
- Bootstrappers (1989)
- Gi=Go (1992)
