= Ben Miller (musician) =

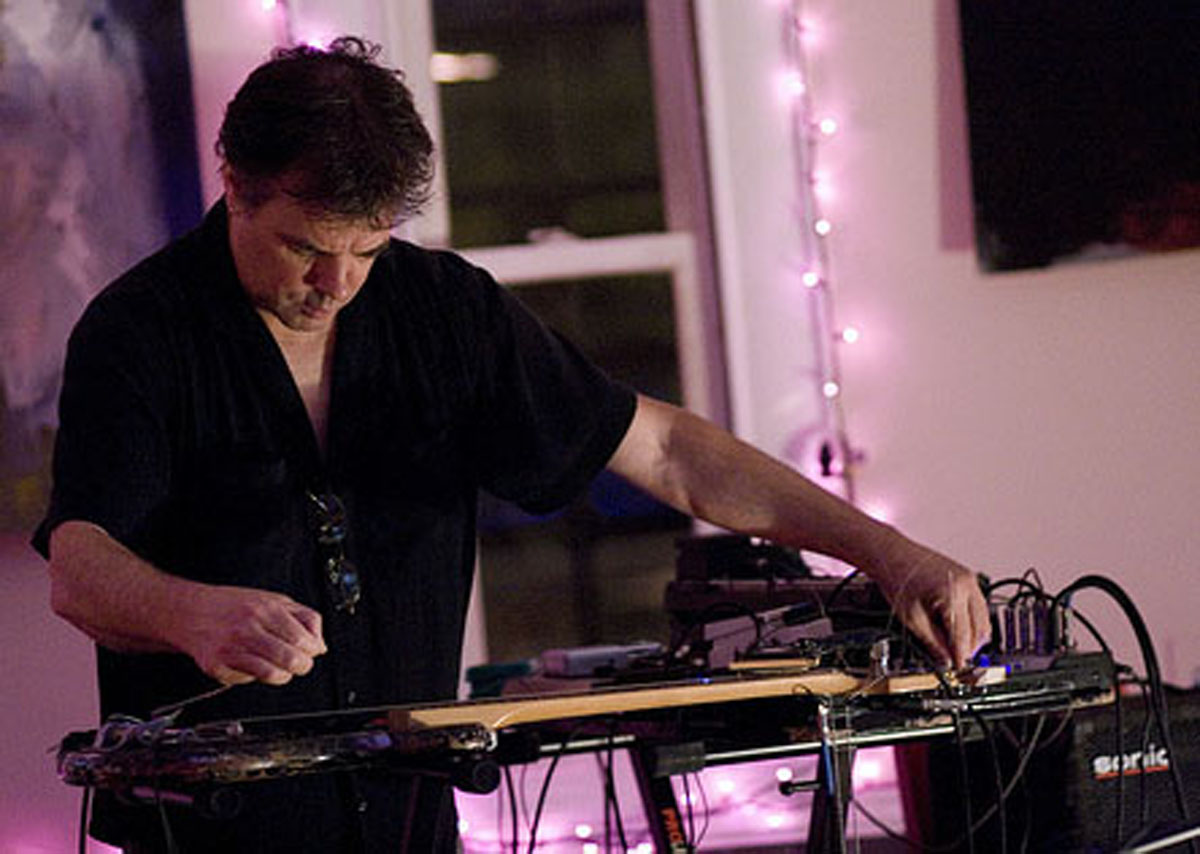
- Ben Miller at The Armory, Somerville, MA (photo by Bridget Toner)

Background information
- Birth name: Benjamin Miller
- Origin: Ann Arbor, Michigan
- Years active: 1970s–present
- Website: benmiller.info

Ben Miller is an American rock and avant garde guitarist born and raised in Ann Arbor, Michigan, and now based in the NYC-metro area. He has formerly been a member of such Detroit/Ann Arbor bands as Sproton Layer, Destroy All Monsters, and non-fiction. Destroy All Monsters, in particular, still a cult favorite, was a big part of the proto-punk, punk, and post-punk Detroit rock scene, featuring such bands as the MC5, the Stooges, Sonic's Rendezvous Band, and The Up.

Miller comes from an interesting family background where all of his family members were either musicians or scientists. He is the younger brother of Roger Miller, a founding and current member of the Boston-based Mission of Burma, and an identical twin brother to Laurence B. (Larry) Miller, also a former member of Destroy All Monsters. Both of Ben's parents were scientists. His father was well known in the field of paleo-ichthyology and worked as the Curator of Fishes at the University of Michigan. His oldest brother is a well-respected professor and glaciologist. His sister was also a scientist and a professor.

Miller has collaborated with his brothers Roger and Larry on the M3 project, and a project with Roger as M2.

Miller collaborated with his twin Laurence particularly through the 1980s and early 1990s. Since Miller is a right-hander and Laurence is a left-hander, their 1980s power trio "Nonfiction" had a rather powerful visual symmetrical stage presence—the guitar and bass each pointing outward, away from the centrally positioned drummer. Laurence and Ben would typically trade off on bass and guitar, with each preferring to play guitar on his own compositions.

Miller was also instrumental in the founding of Ann Arbor avant-garde label Bulb Records, having recorded the early releases in his basement studio.

Currently Miller performs solo with his self-deconstructed multiphonic guitar (picture), Detroit's Porcelain Hammer, Empool, and NYC's Sensorium Saxophone Orchestra.

Miller grew up in Ann Arbor, attended public schools, and graduated from Pioneer High School. He studied music at the School of Contemporary Music in Boston and more recently obtained a BFA at Columbia College Chicago. Miller has three sons.
