= Larry Miller (guitarist) =

American musician

Laurence Bond "Larry" Miller is an American rock and Avant-garde musician based in Michigan, United States. Miller is a former member of The 4th World Quartet, Empool, Destroy All Monsters, Sproton Layer, M3, Nonfiction, The Empty Set, Larynx Zillion's Novelty Shop, The Mister Laurence Experience, and Tinn Parrow and his Clapfold Platune.

== Biography ==
Laurence grew up in Ann Arbor, MI attended public school, and graduated from Pioneer High School. He went to college at the Boston School of Contemporary Music, finishing up at Thomas Jefferson State College before retiring completely from the academic scene.

Destroy All Monsters, a band Miller was in, was a notable part of the proto-punk, punk, and post-punk Detroit rock scene, featuring such bands as the MC5, the Stooges, and Up. In the late 1980s, he enjoyed renewed commercial success with his single Southpaws Unite!, a John Philip Sousa march crossed with an Avant-garde punk sensibility via the latest Techno Pop technology of the day.

Miller plays guitar left-handed, or “upside down,” in a style popularized by Jimi Hendrix.

Miller began his career as a professional musician at the age of 16 and has made numerous recordings in which all instruments are played by himself, including woodwinds, keyboards, and various stringed instruments.

Laurence has collaborated with his brother Roger Miller from time to time, particularly on the M3 project, named for the three Miller brothers, but he has collaborated with his twin Ben most consistently over the years, particularly through the 1980s and early 1990s. Since Ben is right-handed and Laurence is left-handed, they collaborated mostly as a power trio with a drummer. When Nonfiction ended, Laurence formed The Empty Set, and then later in the 1990s creating Larynx Zillion's Novelty Shop.

In 1999, Laurence reinvented himself as a children's entertainer performing to original canned tracks as his 'play money band'. He released multiple CD collections from 1999 through 2012, later collaborating with Melinda Ingalls (keyboards/vocals) and her animatronic creation "Oso the Drumming Bear".

Currently, he is focused on a new ensemble Tinn Parrow and his Clapfold Platune. Whole-tonal Spazz-Jazz Dada-Rock compositions (some written decades ago) with pockets of free-form improvisation. Cuneiform Records released a recent recording of these called 'MILLER TWINS Early Compositions' with twin brother Ben Miller July 2023. More recently a collective-solo collection on the same label called MY GYMNAISUM MUSEUM.

== Family ==
Laurence Miller is the younger brother of Roger Miller, a founding and current member of the Boston-based Mission of Burma, and the twin brother of Benjamin (Ben) Miller, also a former member of Destroy All Monsters. Laurence's father was a professor (curator of fishes) at the University of Michigan and was well known in the field of paleo-ichthyology. His mother was a 'dynamic force' and was a key support in her husband's work. Laurence also has an older brother who is a professor and glaciologist, and a sister (now deceased) who was also a scientist and a professor.

Laurence has three daughters, Tara, Ashia, and Brittany, from his relationship with the late Donna Savakis.
