= Jan Jakub Kotík =

Czech-American visual artist and drummer

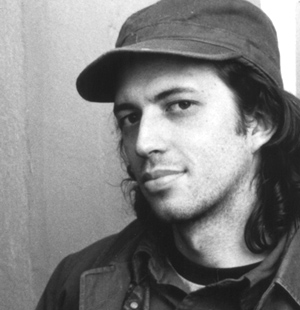
- Jan Jakub Kotík (1998)

Background information
- Born: 22 October 1972; Buffalo, New York, U.S.
- Died: 13 December 2007 (aged 35) Prague, Czech Republic
- Instrument: Drums
- Formerly of: Bootstrappers

Jan Jakub Kotík (22 October 1972 – 13 December 2007) was a Czech-American visual artist and rock drummer.

== Life ==
Jan Jakub was the son of composer Petr Kotík and curator of contemporary art Charlotta Kotík, who emigrated to the United States in 1970. His paternal grandfather was the artist Jan Kotík and his maternal great-grandfather was Tomáš Garrigue Masaryk — first president of Czechoslovakia. Jan Jakub was a musician and a visual artist. He played drums with the Mommyheads, Beekeeper and Church of Betty, among many other bands in New York City at the time. He attended Fiorello H. LaGuardia High School of Music & Art and Performing Arts in New York City and received a Bachelor of Arts degree from the Cooper Union.

In 2000, he moved to Prague, where he became a highly acclaimed visual artist. In 2007, he was a finalist for the prestigious Jindřich Chalupecký Award. On 13 December 2007, he died after a three-year battle with cancer.
