= Oeuvrevue =

Compilation album by Grant Hart
- Released: 26 November 2010
- Recorded: 1989–2009
- Studio: Albatross Studio, Minneapolis, Minnesota
- Genre: Alternative
- Length: 61:00
- Label: Hazelwood; Bang! Records
- Producer: James Lindbloom, Mike Wisti, Grant Hart

Grant Hart chronology
Hot Wax (2009)	Oeuvrevue (2010)	The Argument (2013)

Professional ratings
Review scores
Source	Rating
Ox-Fanzine	8/10 stars
HUMO	2.5/5 stars
Plattentests.de	7/10 stars

Oeuvrevue is a rarities compilation album by Grant Hart, formerly of the bands Hüsker Dü and Nova Mob. It was released on 26 November 2010 by the German label Hazelwood.

The album is a collection of B-sides, live recordings, radio sessions and outtakes recorded by Grant Hart as a solo artist and as part of Nova Mob. Originally released in a limited edition of 1000 copies to coincide with Hart's fall 2010 European tour. It's not a comprehensive retrospective, with the 2541 EP being the most obvious omission. Perhaps surprisingly the Shoot EP is represented, given that Grant Hart was always critical of its release.

From the original liner notes: "Dear listener, what you are holding is a collection of rarities from my career from 1988 to 1995, with a couple of newer songs thrown in for fun listening. Mostly they were recorded for one time airplay on cool stations in Europe. Some were recorded live at clubs or in the broadcast studio. Others were outtakes that appeared on compilation discs or on singles limited to a few hundred copies." – Grant Hart

The album was rereleased on vinyl in June 2016 by Bang! Records.

== Track listing ==
No.	Title	Writer(s)	Original release	Length
1.	"The Main" (Radio session)	Grant Hart	All of My Senses EP, 1990	2:57
2.	"Signed D. C." (Radio session)	Arthur Lee	All of My Senses EP, 1990	2:39
3.	"I Just Want to Make Love to You" (Live)	Willie Dixon	Admiral of the Sea EP, 1991	3:06
4.	"Evergreen Memorial Drive"	Hart	A Matter of Degrees soundtrack album, 1991 and Evergreen Memorial Drive single, 1992	4:30
5.	"Masters of War"	Bob Dylan	Evergreen Memorial Drive single, 1992	4:10
6.	"Shoot Your Way To Freedom"	Hart	Shoot Your Way To Freedom single and Shoot EP, 1992	3:02
7.	"Oh! To Behold"	Hart	Shoot EP, 1992	2:07
8.	"Little Miss Information" (Radio session)	Hart	Old Empire EP, 1994	3:49
9.	"Beyond Reasonable Doubt" (Radio session)	Hart	Old Empire EP, 1994	6:17
10.	"Please Don't Ask" (Live)	Hart	Fingerprints, Vol. 2 various artists compilation, 1997	5:02
11.	"Ballad # 19" (1994 re-recording)	Hart	Minnesota Modern Rock: The Pachyderm Session various artists compilation, 1995	5:00
12.	"Persuaded" (Live)	Hart	Shuffle This various artists compilation, 1996	4:29
13.	"No Promise Have I Made" (Radio session)	Hart	Volume 13, The Lucky Issue various artists compilation, 1995	2:52
14.	"Narcissus, Narcissus" (Remix)	Hart	Unreleased remix of Hot Wax track, 2010	2:39
15.	"Khalid"	Hart	Hot Wax Australian bonus track, 2010	4:05
16.	"Wheels"	Hart	Amazon-only Hot Wax downloadable bonus track, 2009	4:06

- (1, 2, 14 – 16) originally released by Grant Hart, (3–13) by Nova Mob.
- (1, 2) recorded live for BBC Radio Scotland at BBC Studios, London, England, 20 November 1989
- (3) recorded live at La Dolce Vita, Lausanne, Switzerland, 13 May 1990
- (8, 9) recorded live by VPRO at Studio NOB Audio 1, Hilversum, Netherlands, 19 May 1994
- (10) recorded live at ARGE Nonntal, Salzburg, Austria, 14 June 1994
- (12) recorded live at the 7th Street Entry, Minneapolis, Minnesota, 4 September 1993
- (13) recorded for BBC Radio 1, London, England, August 1994

== Personnel ==
- Grant Hart – vocals, guitar, acoustic guitar (1, 2), piano (5), organ (11), drums (13), various instruments (14–16)
- Tom Merkl – bass, vocals (3–13)
- Michael Crego – drums (3–5)
- Marc Retish – drums (6, 7)
- Chris Hesler – guitar (8–13)
- Steve Sutherland – drums (8–12)
