= Good News for Modern Man (album) =

Studio album by Grant Hart
- Released: November 30, 1999
- Recorded: 1997–1998
- Studio: Pachyderm (Cannon Falls, Minnesota)
- Genre: Alternative rock
- Length: 46:33
- Label: Pachyderm
- Producer: Grant Hart, Brent Sigmeth

Grant Hart chronology
| Ecce Homo (1995) | Good News for Modern Man (1999) | Hot Wax (2009) |

Professional ratings
Review scores
| Source | Rating |
|---|---|
| Allmusic | 4/5 stars |
| All Music Guide to Rock | 3/5 stars |
| Exclaim! | (positive) |
| Magnet | (positive) |
| Pitchfork Media | (7.7/10) |

2014 reissue album cover

Good News for Modern Man is the second studio album from Grant Hart, formerly of the band Hüsker Dü. It was released in 1999, ten years after Hart's previous studio album, Intolerance (1989).

The album was remastered and reissued by Hart’s Con d’Or label in 2014 with new album cover art.

== Track listing ==
All songs written by Grant Hart.

1. "Think It Over Now" (3:07)
2. "Nobody Rides for Free" (4:32)
3. "Run Run Run to the Centre Pompidou" (3:45)
4. "You Don't Have to Tell Me Now" (3:44)
5. "Teeny's Hair" (3:16)
6. "A Letter From Anne Marie" (5:59)
7. "In a Cold House" (5:02)
8. "Seka Knows" (4:40)
9. "Remains to Be Seen" (3:12)
10. "Let Rosemary Rock Him, Laura-Louise" (1:32)
11. "Little Nemo" (7:35)

== Personnel ==
- Grant Hart – vocals, instruments, production
- Mato Nanji – lead guitar on "Seka Knows"
- Brent Sigmeth – production, engineering, mixing
- Anna Badger – engineering assistant
- Jed Luhmann – engineering assistant
- Neil Weir – engineering assistant
- Sean David Hank – engineering assistant
