= Pink Turns to Blue =

Song by Hüsker Dü

from the album Zen Arcade
- Released: July 1984
- Recorded: October 1983
- Genre: Hardcore punk; punk rock; pop-punk
- Length: 2:39
- Label: SST
- Songwriter: Grant Hart
- Producers: Hüsker Dü, Spot

"Pink Turns to Blue" is a song by American punk rock band Hüsker Dü. Written by Grant Hart, it is the 17th track on their 1984 double album Zen Arcade. It describes a young woman who gets addicted to drugs, overdoses, and dies. The song was never released as a single, but is considered one of their best songs by Pitchfork.

== Background and composition ==
"Pink Turns to Blue" was written by Grant Hart and recorded in one take, as were most songs on the album. The song examines the devastating effects of drug addiction. Lyrics such as "No more rope and too much dope, she's lying on the bed/Angels pacing, gently placing roses 'round her head," describe the overdose of the protagonist's friend.

== Release and reception ==
The song was released to critical acclaim; Bill Janovitz of Allmusic said that "Pink Turns to Blue"'s buzz saw guitar riff and three-chord chorus sounds like a meeting between the Stooges and the Beatles, or a more serious, soulful Buzzcocks. He called the melody "almost lullaby-like in its sweetness", but remarked that it is "offset by the guitar assault and the lyrics". The New York Times's Robert Palmer named it one of the three best songs on the album, along with "Standing by the Sea" and "Turn on the News", and said the three would be great cuts for any album. The Los Angeles Times's Michael Leyland praised the "haunting" melody. David Fricke of Rolling Stone called it an "icy death lament".

Pitchfork named "Pink Turns to Blue" one of the 500 best songs in the history of punk rock. In its countdown of the 200 best songs of the 1980s, Treble magazine ranked the song #143. Treble's Chris Karman justified the ranking by noting that the song "is the perfect encapsulation of what made Hüsker Dü stand out from their peers." By being "one of (the) first bands to truly mix hardcore's serrated riffs with pop song smarts, Hüsker Dü essentially provided a blueprint for pop-punk's evolution." He criticized the recording as being "a little thin, but everything else about it, right down to its melancholic tone, is practically a perfect prediction of the approach that would be adopted by many early '90s alternative bands." Toby Creswell said "Pink Turns to Blue" was one of the 1001 greatest songs ever recorded. German post-punk band Pink Turns Blue was named after the song.

== Other versions ==
In 1993, "Pink Turns to Blue" was covered by The Blue Up? on Du Huskers: The Twin Cities Replays Zen Arcade. Richmond Fontaine covered the song on their 2006 album Obliteration by Time. The song was included on the compilation CD Gimme Indie Rock, Vol. 1. In 2023, Shinyribs included a cover of "Pink Turns to Blue" on their album Transit Damage.
