= Reoccurring Dream =

Recurring Dream may refer to:

- "The Reoccurring Dream", a song by Joni Mitchell from her 1988 album Chalk Mark in a Rainstorm
- "Reoccurring Dreams", a song by Hüsker Dü from their 1984 album Zen Arcade
- "Dreams Reoccurring", a song by Hüsker Dü from their 1984 album Zen Arcade
