= 2541 =

EP by Grant Hart
- Released: October 1988
- Genre: Alternative rock
- Length: 10:41
- Label: SST (219)
- Producer: Grant Hart

Grant Hart chronology
2541 (1988)	Intolerance (1989)

Professional ratings
Review scores
Source	Rating
AllMusic	4/5 stars
Robert Christgau	B−

2541 is the first solo EP by Grant Hart, formerly of the band Hüsker Dü. It was his first solo release after the break-up of Hüsker Dü in January 1988 and was released as a 3-inch mini CD single and as a 12-inch, 45 rpm vinyl single.

"2541" and "Come, Come" were re-recorded for the album Intolerance (1989).

The name was inspired by 2541 Nicollet Avenue in Minneapolis, the headquarters of influential independent record label Twin/Tone Records. For a time, Hüsker Dü had an office space next door to Twin/Tone at 2539. Marshall Crenshaw, who later covered "2541" for his 1996 album Miracle of Science, said of the song, "I know that it was real personal to [Hart] when he wrote it, but there's something universal about it."

== Critical reception ==
Ira Robbins, in Trouser Press, called the title track "a touchingly sad acoustic folk-rock number with a typically catchy melody." The Encyclopedia of Popular Music wrote that Grant's "anger at the ending of Hüsker Dü ... was eloquently mounted on the back of a downbeat, acoustic number."

== Track listing ==
All songs written by Grant Hart.

No.	Title	Length
1.	"2541"	4:35
2.	"Come, Come"	3:13
3.	"Let Go"	2:53

== Personnel ==
- Grant Hart – vocals, instruments, production
- Tom Herbers – engineering
- Ruben Hernandez Hernandez – backing vocals on “Let Go”
- Tim Piotrowski – backing vocals on “Let Go”
- Steve Snow – backing vocals on “Let Go”
