= Pink Turns Blue =

German rock band

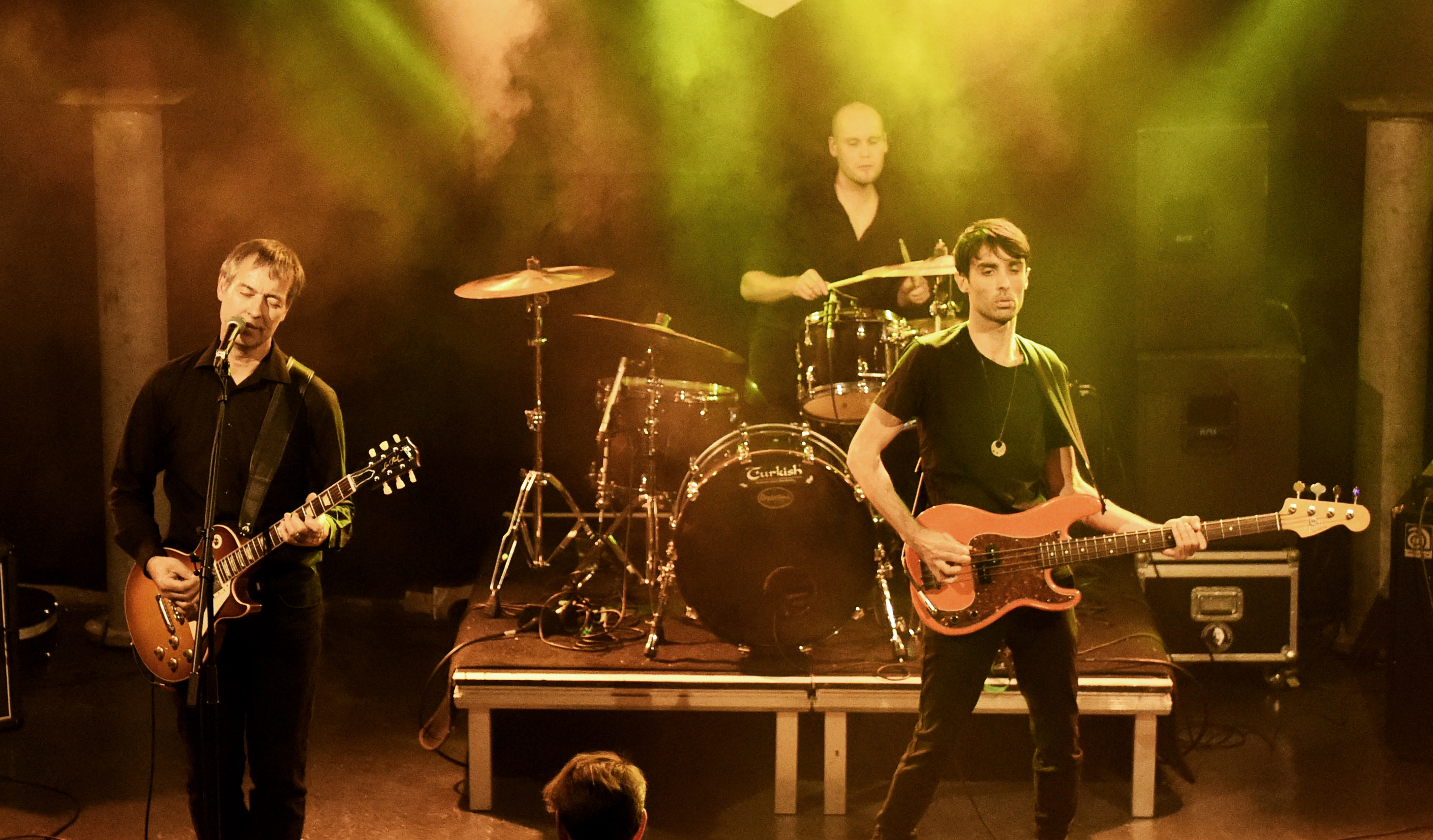
- Pink Turns Blue 2021 (Kulttempel Oberhausen, Germany)

Background information
- Origin: Cologne, Germany
- Genres: Gothic rock, new wave, darkwave, post-punk
- Years active: 1985–1995, 2003–present
- Labels: Fun Factory!, Our Choice, Orden, Strobelight, Dais
- Members: Mic Jogwer; Paul Richter; Luca Sammuri
- Past members: Thomas Elbern; Marcus Giltjes; Ruebi Walter; Louis Pavlou; Brigid Anderson; Reini Walter
- Website: pinkturnsblue.com

Pink Turns Blue are a German rock band from Cologne. Formed in 1985, they were part of the first generation of gothic rock in Germany and released their first LP, If Two Worlds Kiss with a sound reminiscent of new wave with very dark undertones and use of synthesizers, and went to become part of the developing sub-genre of dark wave.

== Beginnings (1985–87) ==
The band originally was a duo consisting of Thomas Elbern (vocals and guitars), Mic Jogwer (vocals, bass and keyboards) and a drum machine.

In 1985, Elbern was part of an NDW-ensemble called Seltsame Zustände but wanted to form a new band in Cologne and was looking for musicians via an ad. The music student Mic Jogwer answered, and they had several small appearances around Cologne under the name Pink Turns Blue, named after the Hüsker Dü song "Pink Turns to Blue". Musically they were oriented towards post-punk bands like early The Cure, The Chameleons or The Sound. In early 1986, art student and drummer Marcus Giltjes joined the band. The trio won a 'new talent award' from Germany's biggest radio station WDR which included as a prize a studio session with producer and radio host Volkmar Kramarz.

== The years as German indie insider tip (1987–91) ==
In June 1987, Mic Jogwer switched from bass to guitar and Ruebi Walter, who joined the band in 1986 as a keyboard player, moved to bass.

In August the band were signed by the newly found record label Fun Factory! The band recorded a few new songs and remixed existing material from 1986 for their debut album If Two Worlds Kiss, released in October 1987.

From October 1987 to March 1988, the band toured and the song Walking On Both Sides got them TV appearances and was played on the radio. They were invited to tour with the controversial Yugoslavian band Laibach, and Jogwer became friends with their soundman Janez Križaj. Križaj invited Pink Turns Blue to record their second album in Ljubljana. To pay for the recordings, the band smuggled Western studio equipment across the border.

In August 1988, the single Touch The Skies was released, and Pink Turns Blue played their first concerts in England, France, Switzerland and the Netherlands. In October, their second album Meta was released which carried the keyboard heavy The Cure sound to extremes and which sold 2,300 units within 8 weeks. As second single, Your Master Is Calling, was released which got them TV appearance in Tele 5, was on rotation of many radio stations and is their most popular song to date with more than 3.8 million YouTube views.

The third album Eremite also was recorded with Janez Križaj in Ljubljana and was finished in August 1989. However, their record label Fun Factory got into financial difficulties and Pink Turns Blue switched to the Rough Trade Records sub-label Our Choice, which released the album in April 1990. "Michelle" was remixed in Manchester and released in October as a single. Early 1990, Ruebi Walter's younger brother Reinhold joined on keyboards, and drummer Marcus Giltjes left the band.

The fourth studio album, Aerdt (Art+Earth), was recorded between January and February 1991 in Ljubljana by Mic Jogwer and Ruebi Walter as a duo. A drum machine was used. The album was released in August. The band performed the songs live with a conventional setup supported a hired drummer.

== Relocation to London (1991–95) ==
In spring 1991, after finishing the album Aerdt, Mic Jogwer and Ruebi Walter moved to London. The song "Seven Years" from Aerdt was re-recorded in a dance version and released as a single in September. In early 1992, two more dance oriented singles followed: "Overloaded" and "Star".

In May 1992 Pink Turns Blue recorded their fifth album, Sonic Dust, with their new English drummer Louis Pavlou, and it was released in August.

In December 1992, Pink Turns Blue recorded their sixth album, Perfect Sex, with David M. Allen, the producer of The Cure and Sisters Of Mercy. It was released after some delay in 1994. Louis Pavlou left the band to join The Cure to record Wild Mood Swings.

In November 1994, the unplugged album Muzak was released which was recorded by Mic Jogwer and his sound engineer colleague Marc Williams in his London flat. It contains a selection of Pink Turns Blue songs performed with acoustic instruments.

In 1995, Pink Turns Blue disbanded. Mic Jogwer later remarked that with the move to London, the band lost its musical orientation and spread itself too thin. Mic Jogwer made a career in the music and media industry producing CD ROMs and websites.

== Reunion (2003–present) ==
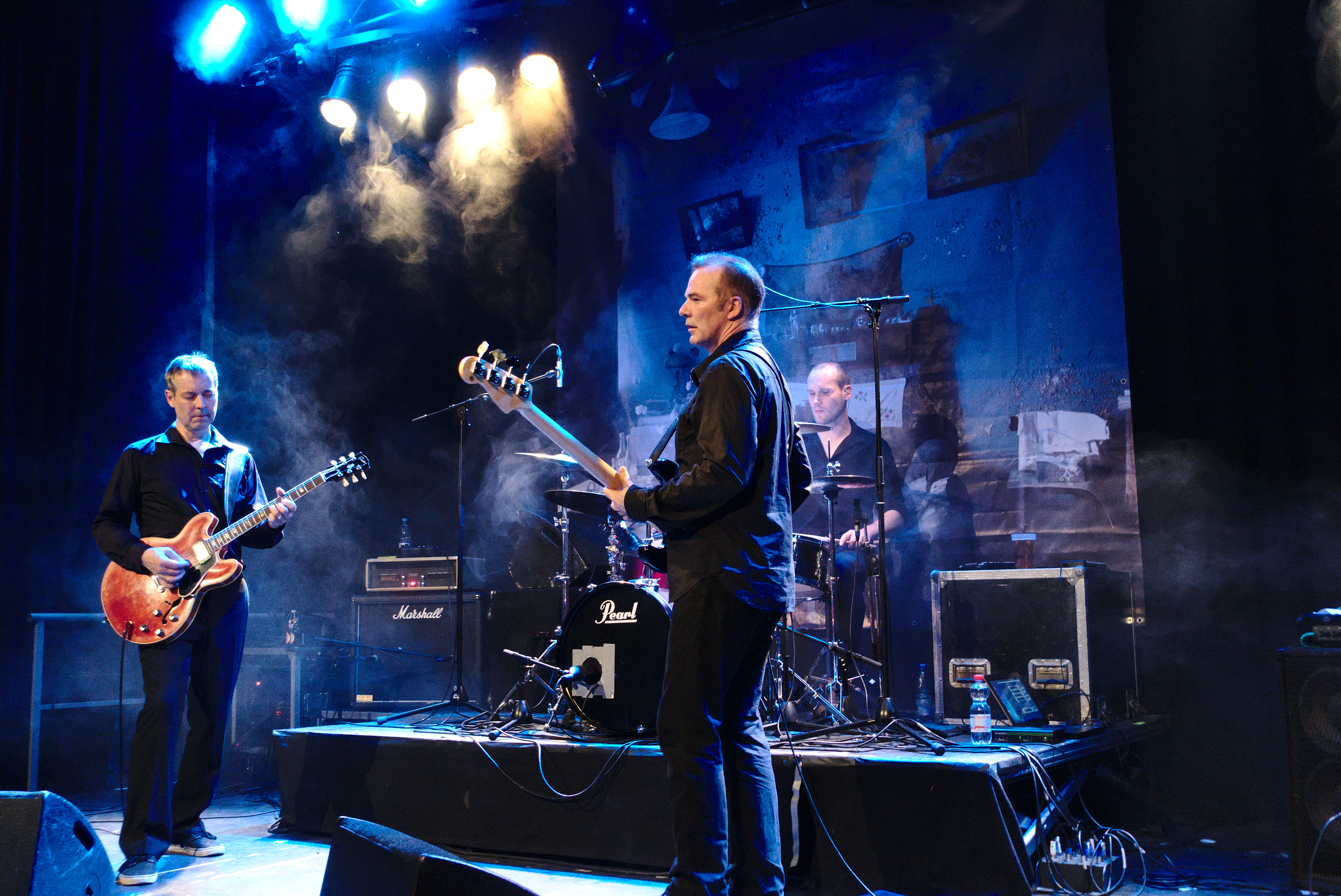
Pink Turns Blue performing in 2018

In April 2001, Mic Jogwer produced three songs with Violetta Superstar, the band of Brigid Anderson which was released in October 2001 on a compilation CD (Die fiesen Diven). The two formed an electronic duo called Orden and started to write songs together and recorded some Demos.

Early 2003, Thomas Görnert, the manager of the Wave-Gotik-Treffen in Leipzig, requested a performance of Orden and he addressed Mic Jogwer's band Pink Turns Blue. Jogwer and Andersen persuaded Thomas Elbern, Reini Walter and Louis Pavlou into a one-off Re-Union show and Pink Turns Blue performed at the Wave-Gotik-Treffen in June 2003. Following this, the band reformed and played as headliners at M'era Luna 2004.

The restart was announced in combination with a greatest hits album called Re-Union.

The seventh studio album Phoenix was recorded in Berlin in winter 2004/2005, mixed by Janez Križaj in Ljubljana and released in April 2005. The album received 'album of the months awards' in three music magazines (Sonic Seducer, Orkus, Zillo) and spent eight weeks on chart position 3 in the German Alternative Charts.

The eighth album, Ghost, which came about in the same setting in fall/winter 2006/2007 followed in May 2007. The release was presented at the Wave-Gotik-Treffen 2007 and again got 'album of the month awards', made it to chart position 37 of the annual German Alternative Charts.

In November 2009 the band recorded their ninth album Storm with the singles Storm Rider and Run From Me which made it to chart position 2 in the German Alternative Charts. Storm also got critical acclaim from the mainstream press (laut.de) and brought international attention and festival invitations.

In April 2016 Pink Turns Blue released their tenth studio album The AERDT – Untold Stories with their Club EP staying on chart position 3 for eight consecutive weeks in the German Alternative Charts. With the success on the alternative chart in combination with placements and attention on the Internet as on Apple Music, Spotify, YouTube, Facebook and Last FM the band has since played at various alternative music clubs and festivals in Europe and worldwide.

In September 2021 the band released their eleventh album TAINTED which received overwhelmingly positive responses, including 'album of the year 2021' by Byte FM (Hamburg), top album of the year 2021 by Post Punk Com (New York) and 4 songs from the album entering the German Indie Disko Top 40 for more than 20 weeks with "There Must Be So Much More" on chart position 1 for two weeks (week 23 and week 24), "You Still Mean Too Much To Me" reaching positions 2 and 3 (week 36 / week 37) and "Not Even Trying" reaching chart position 7 (week 39). Also, three tracks ended up in the top 200 Indie Disko 2021 Annual Charts on positions 14 (There Must Be So Much More), 29 (You Still Mean Too Much To Me) and 170 (Not Even Trying).

With their twelfth album BLACK SWAN released in February 2025, the band managed to underpin their current status as an institution of the post-punk movement with effusive reviews from leading music journalists in the USA (Post-Punk.com, The Big Takeover, Indie Obsessive), as well as three songs for 17 weeks in the important “Indie Disco Top 40 Charts” with “Dancing With Ghosts” peaking for 3 weeks on position 1, “Can't Do Without You” peaking on position 19 and “Stay for the Night” peaking on position 25, and to establish the band as an integral part of the growing post-punk scene worldwide.

== Awards ==
Awards
Society	Award	Year
Westdeutscher Rundfunk	New Talent Award	1986
Sonic Seducer	Album of the Month (#2)	2005
Sonic Seducer	Album of the Month (#1)	2007
Byte FM	Album of the Year (#1)	2021
Post Punk Com	Best of 2021 (#6)	2021

== Discography ==
=== Studio albums ===
- 1987: If Two Worlds Kiss (LP/CD/Cassette)
- 1988: Meta (LP/CD/Cassette)
- 1990: Eremite (LP/CD)
- 1991: Aerdt (LP/CD)
- 1992: Sonic Dust (CD)
- 1993: Muzak (CD)
- 1994: Perfect Sex (CD)
- 2005: Phoenix (CD)
- 2007: Ghost (CD)
- 2010: Storm (CD)
- 2016: The AERDT – Untold Stories (CD)
- 2021: TAINTED (LP/CD)
- 2025: Black Swan (LP/CD)

=== Compilation albums ===
- 1998: Best of and Rarities (Compilation CD)
- 2004: Re-Union (Compilation CD)

=== Singles/EPs ===
- 1988: Touch the Skies (12"/MCD)
- 1988: Your Master Is Calling (12"/MCD)
- 1990: Michelle (12"/MCD)
- 1991: The Son (12"/MCD)
- 1991: Seven Years (12"/MCD)
- 1991: Overloaded (12"/MCD)
- 1992: Star (12"/MCD)
- 1994: Talk Baby (12"MCD/7'Vinyl)
- 2005: Phoenix (MCD)
- 2010: Storm Rider / Run From Me (7"Vinyl)
- 2016: The Aerdt Club EP (12"MCD)
