= Admiral of the Sea (EP) =

EP by Nova Mob
- Released: February 1991
- Recorded: 13 May 1990, Autumn 1990
- Studio: Pachyderm Studios, Cannon Falls, Minnesota
- Genre: Alternative rock
- Length: 18:09
- Label: Rough Trade
- Producer: Nova Mob, Dave Kent

Nova Mob chronology
Admiral of the Sea (1991)	The Last Days of Pompeii (1991)

Professional ratings
Review scores
Source	Rating
Allmusic	4.5/5 stars

Admiral of the Sea is the first EP by the American alternative rock band Nova Mob, a band formed by former Hüsker Dü drummer Grant Hart. It was released in February 1991 by Rough Trade.

== Track listing ==
All songs written by Grant Hart, except where noted

No.	Title	Writer(s)	Length
1.	"Admiral of the Sea" (First Ave. Mix)		3:38
2.	"Admiral of the Sea" (Run-Off Mix)		3:53
3.	"The Last Days of Pompeii" (Single Mix)		4:23
4.	"Getaway in Time" (Instrumental)		3:35
5.	"I Just Want to Make Love to You" (Live)	Willie Dixon	3:05

- Track 5 is recorded live at La Dolce Vita, Lausanne, Switzerland, 13 May 1990

== Personnel ==
- Grant Hart – vocals, guitar, production
- Tom Merkl – bass, production
- Michael Crego – drums, production
- Dave Kent – production, engineering
- Steve Noonan – assistant engineering
- Steve McLellan – collage
- Flat Earth – sleeve layout
