= Turn On the News =

Song by Hüsker Dü

from the album Zen Arcade
- Released: July 1984
- Recorded: October 1983
- Genre: Hardcore punk
- Length: 4:21
- Label: SST
- Songwriter(s): Grant Hart
- Producer(s): Hüsker Dü; Spot

"Turn On the News" is a song by American punk rock band Hüsker Dü. Written by Grant Hart, it is the 22nd track on their 1984 double album Zen Arcade. The song was never released as a single, but is considered one of their best songs. The Rock and Roll Hall of Fame placed "Turn On the News" on its list of "500 songs that shaped rock and roll".

== Background and composition ==
"Turn On the News" was written by Grant Hart and recorded in one take, as were the majority of songs on the album. The song was one of the more conventional rock songs on the experimental Zen Arcade. It begins with a single piano note repeating while segments of random news stories play. The bass drum beat is added, with a distorted guitar starting the three-chord progression. Hart sings about the mass media's penchant for sensationalism and negative news headlines. The rest of the band shouts as he sings the ironic chorus of "Turn on/Turn on/Turn on the news!"

== Release and reception ==
The song was released to critical acclaim. Tom Maginnis of Allmusic called it "a weighty chunk of dense rock & roll." The New York Times's Robert Palmer named it one of the three best songs on the album, along with "Standing by the Sea" and "Pink Turns to Blue", and said the three would be great cuts for any album. David Fricke of Rolling Stone remarked that the harsh vocals "often obscure lyric bull's-eyes." Slant magazine praised the song as "raise-your-fists anthemic". The Chicago Tribune's Joshua Klein highlighted it as a superior album track and one of the "harbingers of Husker Du's melodic maturation." Robert Christgau said "Turn On the News" was the best song of 1984. The Rock and Roll Hall of Fame named the song one of the "500 songs that shaped rock and roll."

== Other versions ==
In 1993, "Turn On the News" was covered by Big Trouble House on Du Huskers: The Twin Cities Replays Zen Arcade.
