= Hot Wax (album) =

Studio album by Grant Hart
- Released: October 6, 2009
- Recorded: 2005–2009; Hotel2Tango, Montreal; Albatross Studio, Minneapolis, Minnesota
- Genre: Alternative rock
- Length: 34:10
- Label: Con D'Or

Grant Hart chronology
Good News for Modern Man (1999)	Hot Wax (2009)	Oeuvrevue (2010)

Professional ratings
Review scores
Source	Rating
Allmusic	4/5 stars

Hot Wax is the third solo album from Grant Hart, formerly of the band Hüsker Dü. It was released on October 6, 2009. The album followed Good News for Modern Man, released in 1999.

== Recording ==
This album was recorded in both Montreal, Quebec and Minneapolis, Minnesota. The first sessions for the album were in 2005 and Hart traveled to Montreal a dozen times over three years to record with members of the bands Godspeed You! Black Emperor and A Silver Mt. Zion. However, with only half of the album finished, the traveling became an inconvenience. Hart also realized that “those guys didn’t necessarily want to chase the same exact pinpoint I was chasing.” The album was eventually finished in Minneapolis with Albatross Studio founder Mike Wisti.

"You're the Reflection of the Moon on the Water" is one of the most organic rock and roll songs that I have ever written. Its style owes a lot to my devotion for Patti Smith. It was inspired by a video made by a monk during the selection process to find the next Panchen Lhama, who said of one candidate, "He is the reflection of the moon on the water but he is not the moon." - Grant Hart

== Track listing ==
All songs written by Grant Hart.

1. "You're the Reflection of the Moon on the Water" (4:20)
2. "Barbara" (4:17)
3. "Charles Hollis Jones" (4:23)
4. "Schoolbuses Are for Children" (5:31)
5. "Narcissus Narcissus" (2:44)
6. "California Zephyr" (2:59)
7. "Sailor Jack" (3:59)
8. "I Knew All About You Since Then" (2:08)
9. "My Regrets" (3:45)

Bonus Tracks

1. "Khalid" (Listed between tracks 4 and 5 on Australian/New Zealand edition)

== Personnel ==
- Grant Hart – vocals, instruments
- Efrim Menuck – handclaps, mixing on track 1
- Thierry Amar – bass viol, bass, handclaps, string arrangement on track 2
- Brian Litson – trumpet on track 2
- Genevieve Heistek – viola on track 2
- Sophie Trudeau – violin on track 2
- Jessica Moss – violin on track 2
- Beckie Foon – cello on track 2
- David Odegaard – bass on track 6
- Basia Bulat – vocals on track 9
- Howard Bilerman – recording, engineering on tracks 1, 2, 4, 9
- Mike Wisti – recording, bass on track 7, engineering on track 3, 5, 6, 7, 8
