= The Argument (Grant Hart album) =

Studio album by Grant Hart
- Released: July 22, 2013
- Recorded: 2010–2012
- Studio: Albatross Studio, Minneapolis, Minnesota
- Genre: Experimental rock
- Length: 74:12
- Label: Domino Records
- Producer: Grant Hart, Mike Wisti

Grant Hart chronology
Oeuvrevue (2010)	The Argument (2013)

Professional ratings
Aggregate scores
Source	Rating
Metacritic	83/100
Review scores
Source	Rating
AllMusic	4/5 stars
The A.V. Club	A−
Consequence of Sound	3.5/5 stars
Pitchfork	8.0/10
Record Collector	3/5 stars

The Argument is the fourth and final solo studio album from Grant Hart, formerly of the band Hüsker Dü. The album was released in 2013, four years before Hart's death. It is a concept album based on John Milton's Paradise Lost, and inspired by Hart's friendship with renowned beat author William S. Burroughs. The album features guitar, keyboards, mallet instruments, and found sounds. It was released to universal critical acclaim.

== Track listing ==
All songs written by Grant Hart, except "Out of Chaos" by Grant Hart and John Milton.

No.	Title	Length
1.	"Out of Chaos"	1:56
2.	"Morningstar"	4:20
3.	"Awake, Arise"	5:16
4.	"If We Have The Will"	3:20
5.	"I Will Never See My Home"	4:36
6.	"I Am Death"	2:33
7.	"Sin"	2:56
8.	"Letting Me Out"	3:02
9.	"Is The Sky The Limit"	3:40
10.	"Golden Chain"	2:40
11.	"So Far From Heaven"	3:35
12.	"Shine, Shine, Shine"	4:33
13.	"It Isn't Love"	4:15
14.	"War In Heaven"	4:30
15.	"Glorious"	3:18
16.	"(It Was a) Most Disturbing Dream"	4:00
17.	"Underneath the Apple Tree"	3:10
18.	"The Argument"	5:56
19.	"Run For The Wilderness"	3:10
20.	"For Those Too High Aspiring"	3:38

== Personnel ==
- Grant Hart – vocals, instruments, production
- Davin Odegaard – bass
- Peter Susag – upright bass on track 11
- Aron Woods – drums on track 11
- Mike Wisti – production
- Andrew Moxom – photography
- Rob Carmichael – design
