= Ecce Homo (Grant Hart album) =

Live album by Grant Hart
- Released: November 13, 1995
- Recorded: October 13, 1994
- Venue: Crocodile Cafe, Seattle
- Genre: Alternative rock; acoustic rock
- Length: 38:59
- Label: World Service
- Producer: Mark Minkler

Grant Hart chronology
All of My Senses (1990)	Ecce Homo (1995)	Good News for Modern Man (1999)

Ecce Homo is a live album by Grant Hart, formerly of the alternative rock bands Hüsker Dü and Nova Mob. Recorded in October 1994, it was released in November 1995 on World Service.

The album features Hart performing songs from Hüsker Dü, Nova Mob and his solo career on an acoustic guitar. Recorded the night of Nova Mob's demise, Grant Hart played an impromptu acoustic solo set to replace his old band's gig and it features a good selection of his best songs.

Professional ratings
Review scores
Source	Rating
Allmusic	3/5 stars
All Music Guide to Rock	3/5 stars
Rough Guide to Rock	(positive)

== Track listing ==
All songs written by Grant Hart.

1. "Ballad #19" (3:31)^
2. "2541" (3:15)¤
3. "Evergreen Memorial Drive" (2:37)^
4. "Come, Come" (2:54)¤
5. "Pink Turns to Blue" (2:00)+
6. "She Floated Away" (2:25)+
7. "The Girl Who Lives On Heaven Hill" (2:40)+
8. "Admiral of the Sea" (2:21)^
9. "Back from Somewhere" (1:45)+
10. "The Last Days of Pompeii" (3:29)^
11. "Old Empire" (2:55)^
12. "Never Talking to You Again" (1:38)+
13. "Please Don't Ask" (3:43)^
14. "The Main" (3:34)¤

Key:

+ originally a Hüsker Dü song

^ originally a Nova Mob song

¤ originally a solo release

== Personnel ==
- Grant Hart – vocals, acoustic guitar
- Mark Minkler – production
