= Zen Arcade =

Studio album by Hüsker Dü
- Released: July 3, 1984
- Recorded: October 1983
- Studios: Total Access, Redondo Beach, California
- Genres: Hardcore punk; psychedelia; indie rock; post-hardcore; Alternative Rock
- Length: 70:09
- Label: SST (027)
- Producers: Hüsker Dü, Spot

Hüsker Dü chronology
| Metal Circus (1983) | Zen Arcade (1984) | New Day Rising (1985) |

Zen Arcade is the second studio album by American punk rock band Hüsker Dü, released in July 1984 on SST Records. Originally released as a double album on two vinyl LPs, Zen Arcade tells the story of a young boy who runs away from an unfulfilling home life, only to find the world outside is even worse. Zen Arcade and subsequent Hüsker Dü albums were instrumental in the creation of the alternative rock genre, and it is considered by some to be one of the greatest rock albums of all time.

== Background ==
Hüsker Dü had gained notice in the American indie music scene of the early 1980s as a fast, aggressive hardcore punk band. They were the first non-West Coast group signed to the California independent record label SST Records, which at the time specialized in releases by hardcore bands, most notably Black Flag. However, the trio's music was becoming more melodic and nuanced with each album; songs such as "Diane" (from the EP Metal Circus), a true story about the rape and murder of a young woman, covered subjects not addressed in hardcore at the time, and the band indicated an interest in 1960s rock by covering The Byrds' "Eight Miles High".

In an interview with Steve Albini for his Matter column in 1983, singer and guitarist Bob Mould told Albini: "We're going to try to do something bigger than anything like rock & roll and the whole puny touring band idea. I don't know what it's going to be, we have to work that out, but it's going to go beyond the whole idea of 'punk rock' or whatever."

The band began rehearsing in preparation for the album during the summer of 1983, in a church-turned-punk squat in St. Paul, Minnesota. The band brainstormed lyrics and musical ideas during jam sessions that lasted several hours. Mould and drummer Grant Hart were the band's songwriters, and prior to embarking to California to record Zen Arcade, Mould was moved (by artwork that Hart had done for another band that did not list songwriting credits) to demand that Zen Arcade list individual songwriter credits. This practice would continue on all of the band's subsequent albums and would contribute to ever-growing tensions between Mould and Hart.

== Recording and production ==
As their EP Metal Circus was being released, Hüsker Dü entered the Total Access Studio in Redondo Beach, California to record their next album with SST producer Spot. The band recorded 25 tracks, with all but two songs ("Something I Learned Today" and "Newest Industry") being first takes, in 40 hours. The entire album was then mixed in one 40-hour session; the entire album took 85 hours to record and produce and cost $3,200. The band collaborated with underground contemporaries during recording; "What's Going On" contains guest vocals from ex-Black Flag vocalist Dez Cadena.

"Eight Miles High" was also recorded at the sessions and released as a non-album single in April 1984. In a 2019 interview with Stereogum, Mould talked about the track, saying, "Everything we did in the studio, basic tracks, was first take. We did not want to use one of the songs from the album as a warm up track. We would jam a little. We had to do something, so that was the first song. We did that, and I did vocals right away to warm up. It's a pretty crazy vocal take. It became this calling card, at the moment, for the band, coming out right before Zen Arcade".

== Composition ==
=== Music ===
Zen Arcade, in line with previous Hüsker Dü albums, had a mainly hardcore punk focus, with songs such as "Indecision Time" and "Pride" displaying common traits of the hardcore punk genre. However, the album also marked the point where the band introduced a more melodic and guitar-driven musical style, with elements of acoustic folk ("Never Talking to You Again"), psychedelia ("Hare Krsna" and "The Tooth Fairy and the Princess") and piano interludes ("One Step at a Time," "Monday Will Never Be the Same"), concepts rarely touched upon in early '80s hardcore punk.

Indicative of the band's desire for the album to be taken as a whole, no singles were released from it.

The opening song, written by guitarist Bob Mould, was often used to open their set as early as 1983. The lyric describes growing up and trusting few people. A fast-paced song with simple verse and chord progressions, it begins with a simple drum beat, then an undulating bass rhythm, and finally kicks into the verse riff. Mould and Hart harmonize vocally in the chorus.

=== Lyrics ===
Zen Arcade tells the story of a young man who runs away to escape a miserable and abusive home life ("Broken Home, Broken Heart", "Never Talking to You Again"). The character briefly joins the military ("Chartered Trips"), turns to religion ("Hare Krsna"), and seems to find a tenuous peace through love ("Somewhere") before losing his lover to drugs ("Pink Turns to Blue"). He reaches a point of despair, ultimately concluding that he won't be able to change his circumstances ("Newest Industry", "Whatever") before waking up to find that the whole odyssey had occurred in his subconscious during a night of troubled sleep; the challenges of his life—for better or worse—remain in front of him ("The Tooth Fairy and the Princess", "Turn on the News"). "Reoccurring Dreams", a disorienting 14-minute instrumental that reprises a shorter instrumental interlude ("Dreams Reoccurring"), closes the album.

== Release ==
While the band insisted sales would be strong for Zen Arcade, SST initially pressed only between 3,500 and 5,000 copies of the album. The album was out of stock for months afterward and the delay in further copies stifled sales.

== Critical reception ==
Professional ratings
Review scores
| Source | Rating |
|---|---|
| AllMusic | 5/5 stars |
| Chicago Tribune | 3.5/4 stars |
| The Encyclopedia of Popular Music | 5/5 stars |
| The Great Rock Discography | 9/10 |
| MusicHound Rock | 4.5/5 stars |
| Q | 5/5 stars |
| Rolling Stone | 4/5 stars |
| The Rolling Stone Album Guide | 5/5 stars |
| Spin Alternative Record Guide | 10/10 |
| The Village Voice | A− |

Upon its release Zen Arcade received positive reviews in many mainstream publications, including NME, The New York Times and Rolling Stone. In his review for Rolling Stone, David Fricke described Zen Arcade as "the closest hardcore will ever get to an opera ... a kind of thrash Quadrophenia."

Zen Arcade placed eighth in The Village Voice annual Pazz & Jop poll and Robert Christgau declared in his annual review of the poll's results that, while he preferred peers The Replacements' Let It Be, the song "Turn On the News" garnered his nomination for song of the year. The critical praise given to the album drew attention from major labels, including Warner Bros. Records, with whom Hüsker Dü would eventually sign in 1985.

== Legacy ==
The release of Zen Arcade inspired SST label-mates Minutemen to record their own double album, Double Nickels on the Dime in 1984. By spring of 1985 Zen Arcade had sold 20,000 copies, and in subsequent years it has maintained a high critical status regardless of commercial success. AllMusic says in its review of the album that "Hüsker Dü try everything" and while "that reckless, ridiculously single-minded approach does result in some weak moments," it is "also the key to the success of Zen Arcade." In 1989, it was ranked No. 33 on Rolling Stone's list of the 100 greatest albums of the 1980s. The Rock and Roll Hall of Fame has placed "Turn On the News" on its list of "500 songs that shaped rock and roll." It was ranked No. 4 on Spin's list of top 100 Alternative music albums, ahead of Nirvana's Nevermind (No. 5), and Patti Smith's Horses (No. 6). It was also ranked the 32nd best album of the 1980s by Pitchfork Media, who also included "Pink Turns to Blue" in The Pitchfork 500. Slant Magazine listed the album at No. 73 on its list of "Best Albums of the 1980s". Andy Cairns, from the Northern Irish alternative band Therapy?, listed the album as his seventh favourite album of all time on an article for the online music publication Louder Than War. In the article, Cairns said "I got this at a time when [I] needed to hear fearsome music that wasn't just boneheaded rage. An album to completely lose yourself in, a punk headphone album. After sitting through the whole album the world takes on a different colour and taste. The first time [I] heard it [I] thought it sounded like The Byrds with a fuzzbox. I love not only the tunes but all the little interludes and backwards masking that goes on. The whole thing just shimmers from start to finish."

=== Covers ===
Zen Arcade was the subject of two tribute albums, Du Huskers: The Twin Cities Replays Zen Arcade (Synapse Recordings, 1993) and the fan-compiled Something I Learned Today: An International Tribute to Zen Arcade (Krapp, 2004).

== Track listing ==
Zen Arcade was released on double LP, CD and cassette. CD and cassette releases of the album combine all the songs onto a single disc/cassette.

Side one
| No. | Title | Writer(s) | Length |
|---|---|---|---|
| 1. | "Something I Learned Today" | Bob Mould | 2:02 |
| 2. | "Broken Home, Broken Heart" | Mould | 2:04 |
| 3. | "Never Talking to You Again" | Grant Hart | 1:40 |
| 4. | "Chartered Trips" | Mould | 3:39 |
| 5. | "Dreams Reoccurring" | Mould, Hart, Greg Norton | 1:40 |
| 6. | "Indecision Time" | Mould | 2:14 |
| 7. | "Hare Kṛṣṇa" | Mould, Hart, Norton | 3:35 |

Side two
| No. | Title | Writer(s) | Length |
|---|---|---|---|
| 1. | "Beyond the Threshold" | Mould | 1:36 |
| 2. | "Pride" | Mould | 1:48 |
| 3. | "I'll Never Forget You" | Mould | 2:19 |
| 4. | "The Biggest Lie" | Mould | 2:02 |
| 5. | "What's Going On" | Hart | 4:23 |
| 6. | "Masochism World" | Hart, Mould | 2:47 |
| 7. | "Standing by the Sea" | Hart | 3:22 |

Side three
| No. | Title | Writer(s) | Length |
|---|---|---|---|
| 1. | "Somewhere" | Hart, Mould | 2:31 |
| 2. | "One Step at a Time" | Hart, Mould | 0:44 |
| 3. | "Pink Turns to Blue" | Hart | 2:42 |
| 4. | "Newest Industry" | Mould | 3:05 |
| 5. | "Monday Will Never Be the Same" | Mould | 0:53 |
| 6. | "Whatever" | Mould | 3:52 |
| 7. | "The Tooth Fairy and the Princess" | Mould | 2:44 |

Side four
| No. | Title | Writer(s) | Length |
|---|---|---|---|
| 1. | "Turn On the News" | Hart | 4:27 |
| 2. | "Reoccurring Dreams" | Mould, Hart, Norton | 14:00 |

== Personnel ==
Liner notes adapted from the album sleeve.

- Grant Hart – drums; lead and background vocals; percussion; piano on "Chartered Trips", "What's Going On", "Standing by the Sea" and "Monday Will Never Be the Same"
- Bob Mould – lead and background vocals; electric guitar; acoustic guitar; percussion; piano on "Chartered Trips", "One Step at a Time", "Newest Industry" and "Monday Will Never Be the Same", bass on "Turn On the News"
- Greg Norton – bass; background vocals
- Dez Cadena – vocals on "What's Going On"

Technical

- Hüsker Dü – producer
- Spot – producer, engineer
- Fake Name Graphx – artwork
- Mark Peterson – cover photos

== Charts ==
| Chart (1985) | Peak position |
|---|---|
| UK Indie Chart | 11 |
