= All of My Senses =

EP by Grant Hart
- Released: May 1990
- Recorded: August 1989, Kay Bank Studio B., Minneapolis, Minnesota; November 1989, BBC Studios, London
- Genre: Alternative rock
- Length: 9:17
- Label: SST (262)
- Producer: Grant Hart

Grant Hart chronology
Intolerance (1989)	All of My Senses (1990)	Ecce Homo (1995)

Professional ratings
Review scores
Source	Rating
Allmusic	3/5 stars

All of My Senses is an extended play (EP) by Grant Hart, formerly of the band Hüsker Dü. It was released in 1990.

The title track is taken from the album Intolerance (1989).

== Track listing ==
All songs written by Grant Hart, except "Signed D. C." by Arthur Lee

1. "All of My Senses" – 3:45
2. "The Main" – 2:55
3. "Signed D. C." – 2:37
- Track 1 is a shorter edit of the version on Intolerance.
- Track 2-3 are solo live acoustic performances, recorded 20 November 1989 at BBC Studios, London.

== Personnel ==
- Grant Hart – vocals, instruments, production
- Chopper Black – engineering on track 1
- Tom Herbers – engineering on track 1
- Lin Chung Fu – engineering on track 2-3
- John Golden – mastering
