= Intolerance (album) =

Studio album by Grant Hart
- Released: December 12, 1989
- Recorded: 1988–1989
- Genre: Alternative rock
- Length: 38:44
- Label: SST (215)
- Producer: Grant Hart

Grant Hart chronology
| 2541 (1988) | Intolerance (1989) | All of My Senses (1990) |

2010 vinyl reissue album cover

Intolerance is the first solo album by Grant Hart, formerly of the band Hüsker Dü. It was released on December 12, 1989.

The album was remastered and reissued by MVD Audio in 2010 on 180-gram vinyl with new album cover art.

== Critical reception ==
Professional ratings
Review scores
| Source | Rating |
|---|---|
| AllMusic | 4/5 stars |
| All Music Guide to Rock | 4/5 stars |
| Robert Christgau | B |
| The Rough Guide to Rock | (positive) |

Trouser Press called the album "a moving description of Hart's pain as well as an assertion of his survival" and "a simply played one-man band solo project that avoids familiarity by using '60s-style organ as the most prominent rhythm instrument".

== Track listing ==
All songs written by Grant Hart.

1. "All of My Senses" (5:51)
2. "Now That You Know Me" (3:54)
3. "Fanfare in D Major (Come, Come)" (3:45)
4. "The Main" (4:04)
5. "Twenty-Five Forty-One" (4:41)
6. "Roller Rink" (4:23)
7. "You're the Victim" (3:10)
8. "Anything" (3:28)
9. "She Can See the Angels Coming" (3:42)
10. "Reprise" (1:43)

== Personnel ==
- Grant Hart – vocals, instruments, production
- Chopper Black – engineering
- Tom Herbers – engineering
