= The Last Days of Pompeii (album) =

Studio album by Nova Mob
- Released: February 22, 1991
- Recorded: Autumn 1990
- Studios: Pachyderm Studios, Cannon Falls, Minnesota
- Genre: Alternative rock
- Length: 43:58; 59:14 (2010 reissue)
- Label: Rough Trade
- Producers: Nova Mob, Dave Kent

Nova Mob chronology
The Last Days of Pompeii (1991)	Nova Mob (1994)

Professional ratings
Review scores
Source	Rating
Allmusic	4.5/5 stars
Chicago Tribune	2.5/5 stars
The Encyclopedia of Popular Music	3/5 stars
Rough Guide to Rock	(positive)
The Tech	(unfavorable)
The Village Voice	(dud)
Q Magazine	3/5 stars

2011 reissue album cover

The Last Days of Pompeii is the debut studio album by the American alternative rock band Nova Mob, a band formed by former Hüsker Dü drummer Grant Hart. It was released on February 22, 1991 by Rough Trade. The album was remixed and reissued by Con d’Or on January 11, 2011 with bonus tracks and new album cover art. It is a concept album about rocket scientist Wernher von Braun escaping the end of World War II by time-travelling back to Pompeii and the eruption of Mount Vesuvius in AD 79.

The album received mixed reviews with John Aizelwood of Q Magazine noting "fine in itself, but the past is still too great a burden".

== Plot ==
In 1990, Grant Hart told British magazine Select, "It starts out narrated by Pliny the Younger from Pompeii, OK? ... He pretty much gives the general synopsis. The story starts with the fall of Nazi Germany, and Wernher Von Braun doesn't wanna be captured. So he conjures up Wotan, the Nordic God of War, and asks him, like, How the hell do I get out of this mess?" Escaping back in time in a V2 rocket, von Braun meets Pliny the Elder who takes him to Pompeii. He ends up with King Pompedible (from the illustrated book, The Knave of Hearts) trying to control his mind, just as Hitler had tried before. "He slowly comes to the realisation that he's going to be manipulated, no matter what he does. He leaves again, but it's not altogether clear how. It's more or less a transcendental thing involving the eruption (of Vesuvius) - the eruption wakes him up from a sodium pentathol-induced dream."

== Track listing ==
All tracks are written by Grant Hart.

No.	Title	Length
1.	"Introduction"	2:50
2.	"Woton"	5:08
3.	"Getaway (Gateway) in Time"	3:35
4.	"Admiral of the Sea (79 A.D. Version)"	2:23
5.	"Wernher von Braun"	2:18
6.	"Space Jazz"	5:14
7.	"Where You Gonna Land (Next Time You Fall Off of Your Mountain)?"	2:47
8.	"Over My Head"	3:41
9.	"Admiral of the Sea"	3:54
10.	"Persuaded"	3:34
11.	"Lavender and Grey"	4:08
12.	"The Last Days of Pompeii/Benediction"	4:26

2010 reissue bonus tracks
No.	Title	Length
13.	"Intro" (Demo)	1:22
14.	"Wernher von Braun" (Demo)	2:23
15.	"Where You Gonna Land (Next Time You Fall Off of Your Mountain)?" (Demo)	2:54
16.	"Lavender and Grey" (Demo)	4:24
17.	"The Last Days of Pompeii" (Demo)	4:13

- Demos recorded February 14–16, 1990 at Underground Studios, Minneapolis

== Personnel ==
- Grant Hart – vocals, guitar, keyboards, production, remixing (2010 reissue)
- Tom Merkl – bass, production
- Michael Crego – drums, production
- Dave Kent – production, engineering
- Steve Noonan – assistant engineering
- Brent Sigmeth – remixing (2010 reissue)
- Neil Weir – remixing (2010 reissue)
- T.Roberts – engineering (1990 demos)
