= Grant Hart =

American musician (1961–2017)

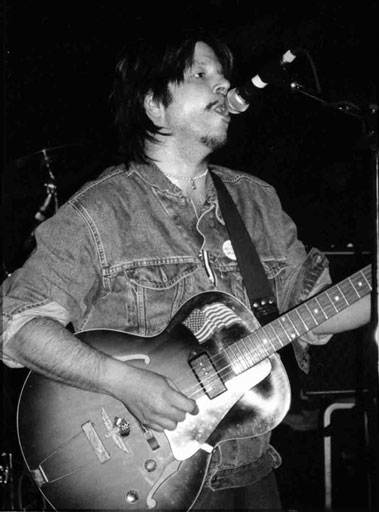
- Hart performing in 2005 at the Metro Club in London

Background information
- Born: Grant Vernon Hart; March 18, 1961; South St. Paul, Minnesota, U.S.
- Died: September 13, 2017 (aged 56) Minneapolis, Minnesota, U.S.
- Genres: Alternative rock; post-hardcore; hardcore punk
- Occupations: Musician; songwriter
- Instruments: Drums; guitar; vocals
- Years active: 1979–2017
- Formerly of: Hüsker Dü; Nova Mob
- Website: granthart.com

Grant Vernon Hart (March 18, 1961 – September 13, 2017) was an American musician, best known as the drummer and co-lead vocalist in the punk rock band Hüsker Dü. After the band's breakup in 1988, he released his first solo album, Intolerance, before forming the alternative rock trio Nova Mob, where he moved to vocals and guitar. His solo career became his main focus after the dissolution of Nova Mob in 1995.

As the co-songwriter of Hüsker Dü, Hart's songs (such as "The Girl Who Lives on Heaven Hill" and "Turn on the News") received praise from critics and contemporaries. His vocal style, in contrast to that of Hüsker Dü bandmate Bob Mould, had a more measured and melodic delivery. His choice of lyrical themes, which ranged from teenage alienation in "Standing by the Sea" and the depiction of a murder in "Diane," to playful story-telling in "Books About UFOs," helped to expand the subject matter of hardcore punk.

Hart died on September 13, 2017, of complications from liver cancer and hepatitis C.

== Early life ==
Grant Hart was born in South St. Paul, Minnesota, the youngest child of a credit union employee and a shop teacher. Hart described his family as a "typical American dysfunctional family [...] Not very abusive, though. Nothing really to complain about." When Hart was 10, his older brother was killed by a drunk driver. Hart inherited his brother's drum set and records; he soon began playing in a number of makeshift bands as a teenager.

Hart met Bob Mould while working at a record store called Cheapo Records in St. Paul, Minnesota. Mould, then a college freshman, would buy marijuana from Hart. At first Hart dismissed Mould as "an upstater pretending to be a Manhattanite," but the two soon became friends.

== Career ==
=== Hüsker Dü ===
Hart formed Hüsker Dü in 1979 with Bob Mould and his friend Greg Norton. The band's early material had them lumped in with the hardcore movement of the early 1980s. The band members received help from their parents in their early days. In Hart's case, his mother let him use the copier machine at the credit union where she worked to make show flyers, and the band added $2,000 to an existing loan at the credit union to release the band's first single, "Statues," on their own label Reflex Records in 1981. Success existed on a small scale for the band; by 1982 Hart was unemployed and relied on support from friends and family.

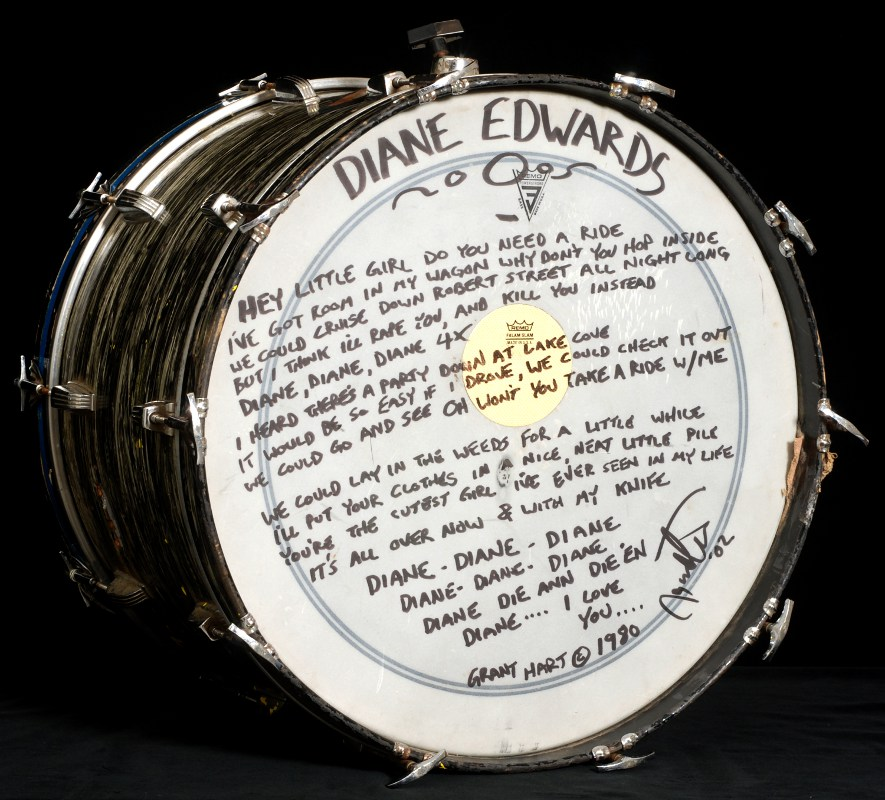
Bass drum used by Grant Hart. Made by the Ludwig Drums Company in the late 1950s, the head has handwritten lyrics to the song "Diane" from the 1983 album Metal Circus.

Hüsker Dü's music became more accomplished and melodic over time. By late 1982, Hart's drumming "rushed the music along more precisely than ever" and he and Mould, who traded vocal duties, were singing more tunefully. While Mould was the band's primary songwriter, Hart began writing more songs. Hart wrote two songs for 1983's Metal Circus EP, the "perversely sing-along" "Diane" and "It's Not Funny Anymore." Hüsker Dü's more melodic take on hardcore struck a chord with college students, and various tracks from Metal Circus, particularly Hart's "Diane," were put into rotation by dozens of campus radio stations across the US. Hart was tagged by observers as the "hippie" of the group due to his long hair and his propensity to drum with bare feet; biographer Michael Azerrad additionally noted that "the wide-eyed sincerity of his songs was far more San Francisco '67 than New York City '77," which contrasted with Mould's "incisively bitter" songs.

As Hart and Mould developed as musicians and songwriters, an unspoken tension and competition arose in the band between them. Tensions were heightened when Mould demanded, starting with 1984's Zen Arcade, that the band's records contain individual songwriter credits. In spite of the creative tensions, Hüsker Dü garnered critical acclaim with the release of Zen Arcade and subsequent albums. Michael Azerrad stated that by 1985's Flip Your Wig "the two songwriters were trying their level best to outdo each other, and with spectacular results". Hüsker Dü had left the hardcore genre behind, which caused some discomfort with their label at the time, SST Records. In one interview, Hart hinted that SST thought Hüsker Dü were "soft" because they stayed in motels while touring and occasionally wrote happy songs. Hart elaborated, "We don't have to convince the world that we're suffering to convince them that we're artists... There's nothing wrong with being happy." Hart designed most of Hüsker Dü's album covers, as well as the album cover for The Replacements' Hootenanny.

In 1986, Hüsker Dü became one of the first key bands from the American indie scene to sign with a major label, inking a deal with Warner Bros. Records. However, tensions within the band worsened after signing the deal. Hart became addicted to heroin following the band's tour behind their major label debut, Candy Apple Grey, in 1986; he was also (incorrectly) diagnosed as HIV-positive in the middle of that year. Mould and Hart were feuding openly with Hart accusing Mould of ensuring he could not have more than 45 percent of the songs on each of the band's albums.

The band dissolved after a show in Columbia, Missouri, in 1987. Hart was trying to quit heroin by using a supply of methadone, but the bottle had leaked. Hart played the show, but Mould and Norton were concerned that Hart would soon be suffering from withdrawal and thus would be unable to play the next few shows. While Hart insisted he could perform, Mould had already canceled the dates. Hart has said his drug use was not the reason for the band's demise; rather, it was the tensions between the band members. Hart said, "It just became that it was easier to be around Bob if you were playing a part of Bob's game," and also said he felt Mould's songs had become increasingly "square."

Although it was often rumored during his Hüsker Dü days that he and bandmate Mould were in a relationship (Hart was openly bisexual, Mould is openly gay, and both acknowledge taking partners on tour), both have flatly denied ever having been romantically involved.

=== Solo career and Nova Mob ===
Six months after Hüsker Dü's breakup, Hart discovered that his diagnosis as being HIV-positive was incorrect. In 1988, he released the solo EP, 2541, on Hüsker Dü's former label SST. The title is taken from the address of his former band's office and rehearsal house, where the members had at one time lived. Marshall Crenshaw would later cover the title song, as would the Go-Betweens' Robert Forster. After the release of the EP, Hart went further into sobriety, recording and releasing the album Intolerance and the associated EP, All of My Senses, in 1989 and 1990, respectively.

In late 1989, he formed a new band, Nova Mob, with Michael Crego on drums, Tom Merkl on bass, and Hart himself taking guitar duties. The band took their name from the novel Nova Express by William Burroughs; it had previously been used by an unrecorded group featuring the young Julian Cope and Pete Wylie. The band released their first EP, Admiral of the Sea, and album, The Last Days of Pompeii, in 1991. The lineup later changed with Marc Retish and then Steve Sutherland on drums, and Chris Hesler on lead guitar. The band routinely toured Europe to warm reception. Nova Mob released their second album, Nova Mob, in 1994, and disbanded after a supporting tour.

=== Later years ===
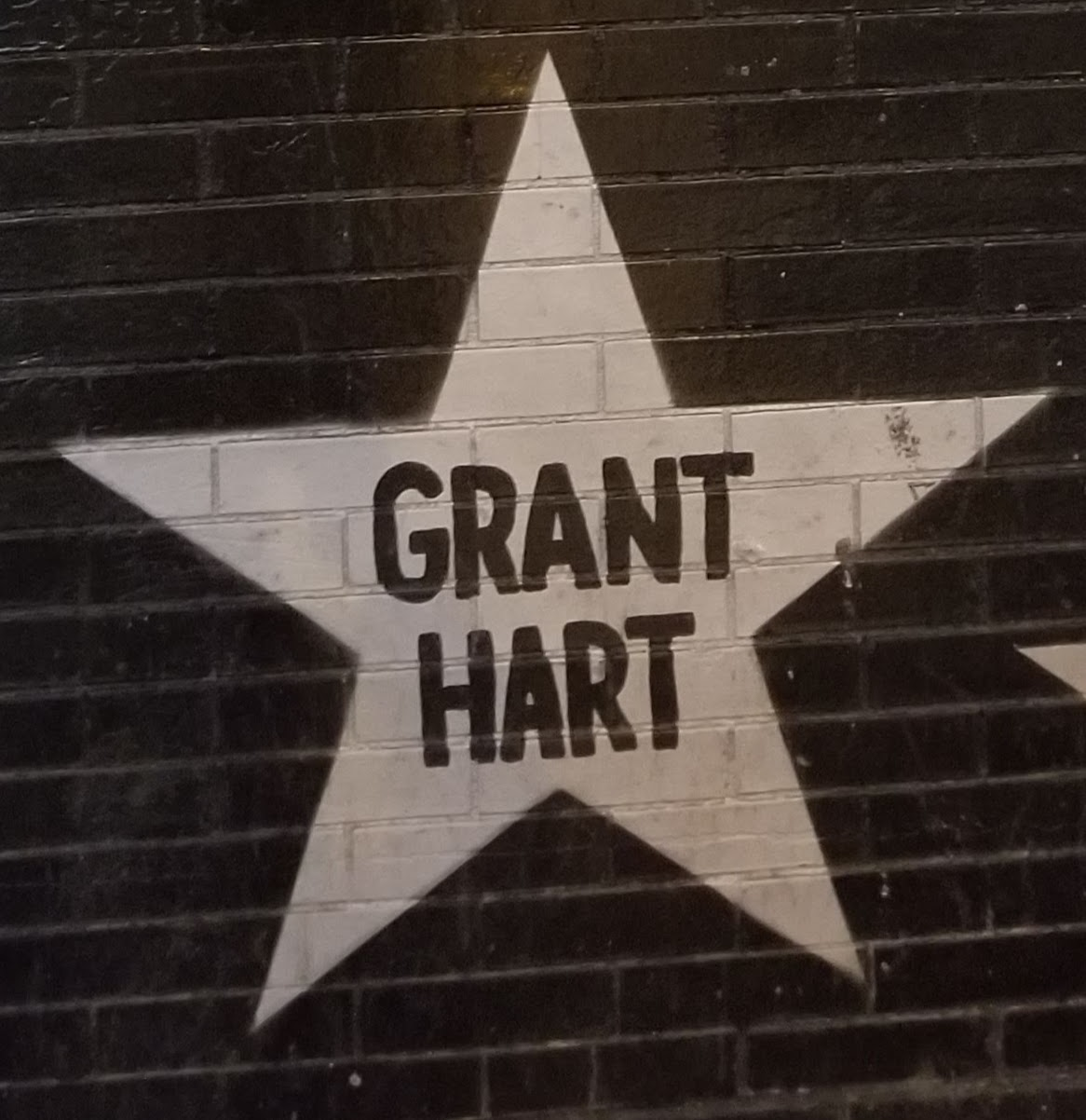
Grant Hart's star on the outside mural of the Minneapolis nightclub First Avenue

Hart returned to recording as a solo artist with the release of the live album Ecce Homo in 1995, and later released Good News for Modern Man in late 1999. On October 21, 2004, he and Mould reunited at the benefit concert for Karl Mueller (bassist for fellow Minneapolis stalwarts Soul Asylum), who was then fighting what would turn out to be a losing battle with cancer.

Hart recorded his next solo album (and first in a decade), Hot Wax, in Montreal and Minneapolis. Hart told Britain's Q in September 2006, "I'm working on some stuff with the Godspeed You! Black Emperor people. They've given more of themselves in a few weeks than Bob did in nine years with Hüsker Dü." In 2008, Hart was one of the guest singers on Lotuk, the third album of Arsenal, a Belgian band combining roots and dance music. In the summer of 2008, Hart debuted a new track, "Schoolbuses Are For Children," on his Myspace site. He released Hot Wax on October 6, 2009. Intolerance was reissued on February 9, 2010, on 180-gram vinyl, and The Last Days of Pompeii was reissued with extra tracks and new mastering on December 7, 2010.

In December 2012, Hart embarked on a short tour of Ireland with a new lineup: Colm O' Herlihy on guitar, Dan Walsh on drums and Simon Dargan on bass. In a Facebook Q&A, Hart commented: "I love playing with these guys. They let me make music rather than getting bogged down administrating a band's business. They make it a joy with their self-starting ways". He confirmed this lineup for the following European and USA dates.

Hart released the double album The Argument (based on John Milton's Paradise Lost) in the summer of 2013. In October 2013, documentary filmmaker Gorman Bechard released Every Everything: The Music, Life & Times of Grant Hart, a film about Hart which chronicles the musician's life from birth to the recording of The Argument. Told in the style of the Errol Morris film The Fog of War, Hart is the only interview subject in the film.

Hart has been honored with two stars on the outside mural of the Minneapolis nightclub First Avenue, one for his solo work and one for Hüsker Dü. The stars recognize performers that have played sold-out shows or have otherwise demonstrated a major contribution to the culture at the iconic venue. Receiving a star "might be the most prestigious public honor an artist can receive in Minneapolis," according to journalist Steve Marsh.

In tribute to Grant Hart and his work with Hüsker Dü, the Posies recorded a song entitled "Grant Hart" which was released on their 1996 album, Amazing Disgrace.

== Personal life ==
In January 2011, Hart suffered a house fire in which his home "caught fire and burned to the ground." His mother died a month later, which Hart claimed occurred "for reasons that a rich man would sue for malpractice."

Hart married Brigid McGough Hart on July 5, 2017, at Church of the Assumption in St. Paul, Minnesota.

=== Death ===
Hart died on September 13, 2017, at 9:02 pm, at Fairview University of Minnesota Hospital, of complications from liver cancer and hepatitis C. He was 56 years old. He is survived by his wife, Brigid McGough Hart, and son, Karl Turbenson.

== Discography ==
Studio albums

- Intolerance (1989, SST)
- Good News for Modern Man (1999, Pachyderm)
- Hot Wax (2009, Con d'Or)
- The Argument (2013, Domino)

Live albums

- Ecce Homo (1995, World Service)

Compilation albums

- Oeuvrevue (2010, Hazelwood)

EPs

- 2541 (1988, SST)
- All of My Senses (1990, SST)

Singles

- "Nobody Rides For Free" (2000, Pachyderm)
- "You're The Reflection" (2010, Amphetamine Reptile)
- "So Far From Heaven" (2011, Con D'Or)
- "Is The Sky The Limit?" (2013, Domino)

=== Nova Mob ===
Nova Mob albums

- The Last Days of Pompeii (1991, Rough Trade)
- Nova Mob (1994, Restless, World Service)

Nova Mob EPs

- Admiral of the Sea (1991, Rough Trade)
- Shoot (1992, Big Store)

Nova Mob singles

- "Evergreen Memorial Drive" (1992, Blackbox Records)
- "Shoot Your Way to Freedom" (1992, Big Store, Tontine Records)
- "Old Empire" (1994, World Service)
