= Nova Mob (album) =

Studio album by Nova Mob
- Released: May 1994 (Europe); July 1994 (U.S.)
- Genre: Alternative rock
- Length: 45:21 (European version); 53:59 (U.S. version)
- Label: Restless; World Service
- Producer: Nova Mob, Chopper Black

Nova Mob chronology
The Last Days of Pompeii (1991)	Nova Mob (1994)

Professional ratings
Review scores
Source	Rating
Allmusic	3/5 stars
Rough Guide to Rock	(positive)

Nova Mob is the second and final studio album by the American alternative rock band Nova Mob, a band formed by former Hüsker Dü drummer Grant Hart. It was released in 1994.

The two bonus tracks "Not Talkin' About" and "Evergreen Memorial Drive" are not listed on the album cover and do not appear on either the European version or the advance U.S. version of the CD. "Evergreen Memorial Drive" is a re-recording of a 1992 single.

"Old Empire" was released as a single, together with three tracks recorded for a VPRO radio session.

== Track listing ==
All tracks are written by Grant Hart, except where noted.

No.	Title	Writer(s)	Length
1.	"Old Empire"		3:19
2.	"Shoot Your Way to Freedom"		3:03
3.	"Puzzles"		5:09
4.	"Buddy"		1:50
5.	"See and Feel and Know"		2:43
6.	"Little Miss Information"		3:49
7.	"I Won't Be There Anymore"	Hart, Tom Merkl	6:13
8.	"Please Don't Ask"		4:51
9.	"The Sins of Their Sons"		2:49
10.	"Beyond a Reasonable Doubt"		6:18
11.	"If I Was Afraid/Coda"	Hart, Merkl/Hart, Chris Hesler	6:02

U.S. bonus tracks
No.	Title	Length
12.	"Not Talkin' About"	2:22
13.	"Evergreen Memorial Drive"	5:25

== Personnel ==
- Grant Hart – vocals, guitar, production
- Tom Merkl – bass, vocals, production
- Chris Hesler – guitar, production
- Steve Sutherland – drums, production
- John (J.C.) Clegg – baritone saxophone on “Shoot Your Way to Freedom”
- Dave Brattain – tenor saxophone on “Shoot Your Way to Freedom”
- Tom Secor – trombone on “Shoot Your Way to Freedom”
- Craig Jacquart – trumpet on “Shoot Your Way to Freedom”
- Kurt Christiansen – trumpet on “Shoot Your Way to Freedom”
- Chopper Black – production, engineering
- Brent Sigmeth – engineering
- Pat Burkholder – engineering
