= The Replacements discography =

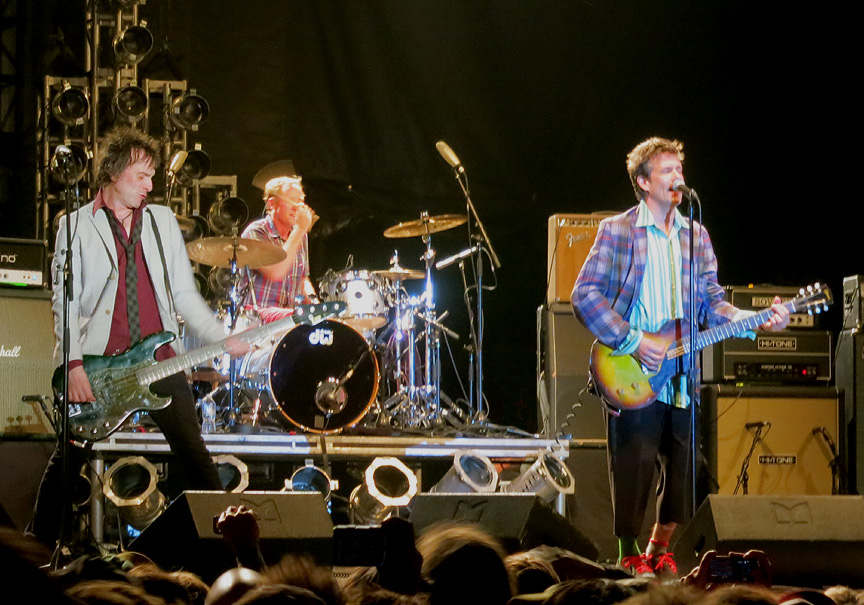
- The Replacements in 2013.
- Studio albums: 7
- Extended plays: 5
- Live albums: 4
- Compilation albums: 7
- Singles: 16
- Music videos: 10

The discography of American rock band The Replacements consists of seven studio albums, four live albums, seven compilation albums, five extended plays, 16 singles and 10 music videos. Formed in Minneapolis, Minnesota by guitarist and vocalist Paul Westerberg, guitarist Bob Stinson, bass guitarist Tommy Stinson, and drummer Chris Mars in 1979, the band signed with Twin/Tone Records the following year.

== Albums ==
=== Studio albums ===
Title	Album details	Peak chart positions	
Title	Album details	US	CAN
Sorry Ma, Forgot to Take Out the Trash	Released: August 25, 1981; Label: Twin/Tone	—	—
Hootenanny	Released: April 29, 1983; Label: Twin/Tone	—	—
Let It Be	Released: October 2, 1984; Label: Twin/Tone	—	—
Tim	Released: September 18, 1985; Label: Sire	183	—
Pleased to Meet Me	Released: March 3, 1987; Label: Sire	131	79
Don't Tell a Soul	Released: February 1, 1989; Label: Sire	57	60
All Shook Down	Released: September 25, 1990; Label: Sire	69	—

=== Live albums ===
Title	Album details	Peak chart positions		
Title	Album details	US	US Rock	US Vinyl
The Shit Hits the Fans	Released: January 25, 1985; Label: Twin/Tone	—	—	—
For Sale: Live at Maxwell's 1986	Released: September 29, 2017; Label: Rhino	52	9	1
The Complete Inconcerated Live	Released: September 26, 2020; Label: Rhino; Included in Dead Man's Pop	187	31	8
Unsuitable for Airplay: The Lost KFAI Concert	Released: April 23, 2022; Label: Rhino	—	—	16

=== Compilation albums ===
Title	Album details	Peak chart positions	
Title	Album details	US	US Vinyl
Boink	Released: April 1986; Label: Glass	—	—
All for Nothing / Nothing for All	Released: October 28, 1997; Label: Reprise	143	—
Don't You Know Who I Think I Was?	Released: June 3, 2006; Label: Rhino	—	—
The Complete Studio Albums 1981-1990	Released: April 14, 2015; Label: Rhino	—	—
The Twin/Tone Years	Released: August 11, 2015; Label: Rhino	—	6
Dead Man's Pop	Released: September 27, 2019; Label: Rhino	171	—
Don't Tell A Soul: Outtakes and Alternates	Released: September 27, 2019; Label: Rhino	— (Note: Don't Tell A Soul: Outtakes and Alternates did not enter the Billboard 200, but it peaked at number 77 on Billboard's Top Current Album Sales chart.)	—
The Pleasure’s All Yours: Pleased to Meet Me Outtakes & Alternates	Released: June 12, 2021; Label: Rhino	—	18

== Extended plays ==
Title	Album details	Peak chart positions		
Title	Album details	US	US Rock	US Vinyl
Stink	Released: June 24, 1982; Label: Twin/Tone	—	—	—
Inconcerated Live	Released: 1989 (promo); Label: Sire	—	—	—
Don't Sell or Buy, It's Crap	Released: 1991 (promo); Label: Sire	—	—	—
Songs for Slim	Released: March 5, 2013; Label: New West	119	35	13
E.P.	Released: April 18, 2015; Label: Rhino	—	—	9

== Singles ==
Title	Year	Peak chart positions			Album
Title	Year	US	US Mod. Rock	US Main. Rock	Album
"I'm in Trouble"	1981	—	—	—	Sorry Ma, Forgot to Take Out the Trash
"Color Me Impressed"	1983	—	—	—	Hootenanny
"I Will Dare"	1984	—	—	—	Let It Be
"Bastards of Young"	1985	—	—	—	Tim
"Kiss Me on the Bus"	1985	—	—	—	Tim
"Can't Hardly Wait"	1987	—	—	—	Pleased to Meet Me
"Alex Chilton"	1987	—	—	—	Pleased to Meet Me
"The Ledge"	1987	—	—	—	Pleased to Meet Me
"Skyway"	1988	—	—	—	Pleased to Meet Me
"Cruella DeVille"	1988	—	11	—	Stay Awake
"I'll Be You"	1989	51	1	1	Don't Tell a Soul
"Back to Back"	1989	—	28	43	Don't Tell a Soul
"Achin' to Be"	1989	—	22	37	Don't Tell a Soul
"Merry Go Round"	1990	—	1	—	All Shook Down
"Someone Take the Wheel"	1991	—	15	—	All Shook Down
"When It Began"	1991	—	4	—	All Shook Down

== Music videos ==
- "Bastards of Young" (1985) (from Tim)
- "Hold My Life" (1985) (from Tim)
- "Left of the Dial" (1985) (from Tim)
- "Little Mascara" (1985) (from Tim)
- "The Ledge" (1987) (from Pleased to Meet Me)
- "Alex Chilton" (1987) (from Pleased to Meet Me)
- "I'll Be You" (1989) (from Don't Tell a Soul)
- "Achin' to Be" (1989) (from Don't Tell a Soul)
- "Merry Go Round" (1990) (from All Shook Down)
- "When It Began" (1991) (from All Shook Down)
