= Ian McCulloch discography =

Cataloguing of published recordings by Ian McCulloch

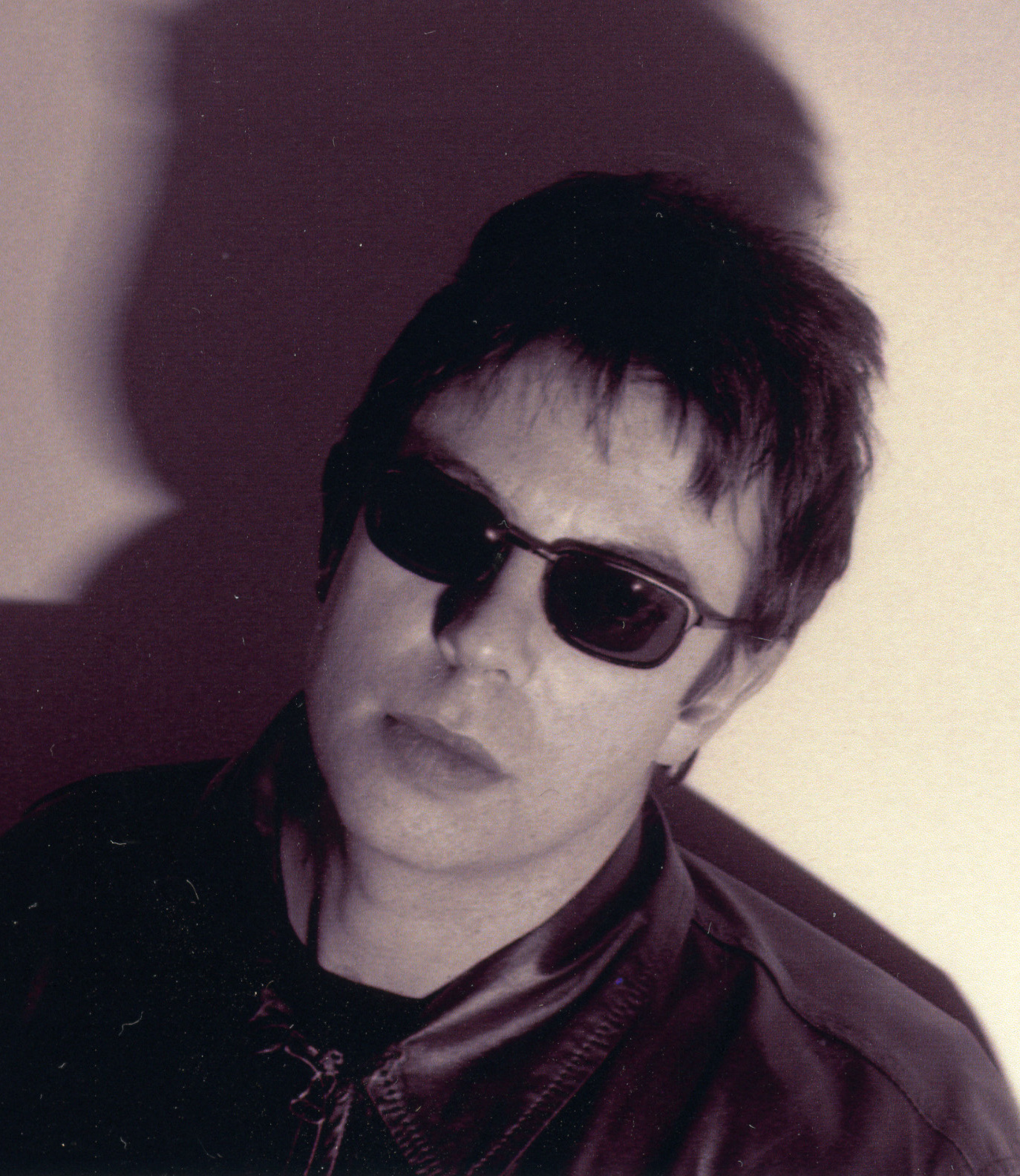
- Studio albums: 4
- Compilation albums: 1
- Singles: 9
- Music videos: 7

The discography of the British singer Ian McCulloch consists of four studio albums, one compilation album, and nine singles. While he was still the lead singer of the band Echo & the Bunnymen, McCulloch released his debut solo single, a version of the standard "September Song", in 1984 which reached number fifty-one on the UK Singles Chart.

McCulloch left Echo & the Bunnymen in 1988 and released his debut solo album, Candleland (1989), which reached number eighteen on the UK Albums Chart. Three singles from the album – "Proud to Fall", "Faith and Healing" and "Candleland (The Second Coming)", which features Elizabeth Fraser of the Cocteau Twins – were released, but did not chart well in the UK. However, "Proud to Fall" reached number one on Billboard magazine's Modern Rock Tracks chart in the United States, while "Faith and Healing" reached number ten on the same chart. Mysterio was released in 1992, reaching number forty-six on the UK Albums Chart. Of the supporting singles – "Honeydrip", "Lover Lover Lover" and "Dug for Love" – only "Lover Lover Lover" (a Leonard Cohen cover) reached the British charts at number forty-six.

In 1993, McCulloch contributed vocals to the track "Moses", on 808 State's album, Gorgeous.

After a brief spell recording as Electrafixion with former Echo & the Bunnymen guitarist Will Sergeant, the pair reformed Echo & the Bunnymen in 1997. While still with the band, McCulloch released a further solo album, Slideling, in 2002. The album failed to chart and, of the two singles released from the album, "Sliding" and "Love in Veins", only the first made the UK Singles Chart, peaking at number sixty-one. In May 2012, McCulloch released his fan-funded fourth studio album, Pro Patria Mori, via website, PledgeMusic.

== Studio albums ==
Year	Album details	Peak chart positions	
Year	Album details	UK	US
1989	Candleland: Released: 17 September 1989; Labels: WEA, Sire; Formats: CD, LP, cassette	18	179
1992	Mysterio: Released: 17 March 1992; Labels: WEA, Sire; Formats: CD, LP	46	—
2003	Slideling: Released: 28 April 2003; Label: Cooking Vinyl; Format: CD	112	—
2012	Pro Patria Mori: Released: 17 May 2012; Label: Self-released; Formats: download, CD	—	—
"—" denotes releases that did not chart.

== Compilation albums ==
Year	Album details
1989	9 Tracks: Released: 1989; Label: WEA Music; Format: CD

== Other album appearances ==
Year	Song	Album	Ref.
1991	"Hey, That's No Way to Say Goodbye", "There is a War"	I'm Your Fan	
2000	"Blue Moon" (with Simon Boswell and Alex James)	There's Only One Jimmy Grimble and No Substitute For Life soundtrack	
2000	"Do You Believe?" (with Simon Boswell and Alex James)	There's Only One Jimmy Grimble and No Substitute For Life soundtrack	
2002	"Jealous Guy"	Uncut Presents: Instant Karma 2002; a Tribute to John Lennon	
2010	"Some Kind of Nothingness"	Postcards from a Young Man by Manic Street Preachers	
2017	"Scoundrel Days" and "The Killing Moon"	MTV Unplugged: Summer Solstice by A-ha	

== Singles ==
Year	Single	Peak chart positions		Album
Year	Single	UK	US Mod	Album
1984	"September Song"	51	—	Non-album single
1989	"Proud to Fall"	51	1	Candleland
1990	"Faith and Healing"	96	10	Candleland
1990	"Candleland (The Second Coming)" (featuring Elizabeth Fraser)	75	—	Candleland
1992	"Honeydrip"	—	6	Mysterio
1992	"Lover Lover Lover"	47	9	Mysterio
1992	"Dug for Love"	—	—	Mysterio
2003	"Sliding"	61	—	Slideling
2003	"Love in Veins"	119	—	Slideling
"—" denotes releases that did not chart.

=== Other charted songs ===
Year	Song	US Mod	Album
1992	"Hey, That's No Way to Say Goodbye"	13	I'm Your Fan

== Music videos ==
Year	Song	Director
1984	"September Song"	
1989	"Candleland"	
1989	"Faith and Healing"	Anton Corbijn
1989	"Proud to Fall"	Tim Pope
1992	"Honeydrip"	
1992	"Lover Lover Lover"	Anton Corbijn
2003	"Sliding"	

== See also ==
- Echo & the Bunnymen discography
