= All for Nothing / Nothing for All =

1997 compilation album by the Replacements

Compilation album by the Replacements
- Released: October 28, 1997
- Genre: Alternative rock
- Length: Disc 1 – 54:36; Disc 2 – 55:23
- Label: Reprise

The Replacements chronology
All Shook Down (1990)	All for Nothing / Nothing for All (1997)	Don't You Know Who I Think I Was? (2006)

Professional ratings
Review scores
Source	Rating
AllMusic	3/5 stars
Pitchfork Media	8.8/10
Uncut	4/5 stars

All for Nothing / Nothing for All is a two-disc compilation album by the Replacements. The All for Nothing disc contains tracks from Tim through All Shook Down, while the Nothing for All disc is a collection of B-sides and other previously unreleased tracks.

== Track listing ==
=== Disc one: All for Nothing ===
No.	Title	From the album:	Length
1.	"Left of the Dial"	Tim (1985)	3:43
2.	"Kiss Me on the Bus"	Tim (1985)	2:53
3.	"Bastards of Young"	Tim (1985)	3:37
4.	"Here Comes a Regular"	Tim (1985)	4:47
5.	"Skyway"	Pleased to Meet Me (1987)	2:06
6.	"Alex Chilton"	Pleased to Meet Me (1987)	3:13
7.	"The Ledge"	Pleased to Meet Me (1987)	4:06
8.	"Can't Hardly Wait"	Pleased to Meet Me (1987)	3:05
9.	"I'll Be You"	Don't Tell a Soul (1989)	3:29
10.	"Achin' to Be"	Don't Tell a Soul (1989)	3:41
11.	"Talent Show"	Don't Tell a Soul (1989)	3:33
12.	"Anywhere's Better Than Here"	Don't Tell a Soul (1989)	2:47
13.	"Merry Go Round"	All Shook Down (1990)	3:40
14.	"Sadly Beautiful"	All Shook Down (1990)	3:16
15.	"Nobody"	All Shook Down (1990)	3:08
16.	"Someone Take the Wheel"	All Shook Down (1990)	3:42
Total length:			54:36

On-Disc Music Videos
No.	Title	Length
1.	"Bastards of Young"	3:41
2.	"Merry Go Round"	3:36
Total length:		7:17

=== Disc two: Nothing for All ===
No.	Title	From the album:	Length
1.	"Can't Hardly Wait" (The Tim version)	previously unreleased; from the Tim sessions	3:06
2.	"Birthday Gal"	previously unreleased; from the Pleased to Meet Me sessions	3:52
3.	"Beer for Breakfast"	previously unreleased; from the Pleased to Meet Me sessions	1:38
4.	"Till We're Nude"	previously unreleased; from the Pleased to Meet Me sessions	2:09
5.	"Election Day"	b-side of "Alex Chilton" single; from the Pleased to Meet Me sessions	2:55
6.	"Jungle Rock" (Hank Mizell cover)	b-side of European 12" "The Ledge" double single; from the Pleased to Meet Me sessions	2:35
7.	"All He Wants to Do Is Fish"	previously unreleased; from the Pleased to Meet Me sessions	2:42
8.	"Date to Church"	previously unreleased; from the Don't Tell a Soul sessions	3:51
9.	"Cruella De Ville"	from Stay Awake: Various Interpretations of Music from Vintage Disney Films (1988)	2:12
10.	"We Know the Night"	previously unreleased, from the Don't Tell a Soul sessions	3:21
11.	"Portland"	previously unreleased, from the Bearsville Don't Tell a Soul sessions	4:30
12.	"Wake Up"	previously unreleased, from the Bearsville Don't Tell a Soul sessions	1:59
13.	"Satellite"	from the Don't Sell or Buy, It's Crap EP	3:39
14.	"Like a Rolling Pin" (Parody of "Like a Rolling Stone")	from the Don't Sell or Buy, It's Crap EP; from the All Shook Down sessions	3:06
15.	"Another Girl, Another Planet" (Live) (The Only Ones cover)	from Inconcerated Live	2:32
16.	"Who Knows"	previously unreleased; from the All Shook Down sessions	3:53
17.	"All Shook Down"	previously unreleased; from the All Shook Down sessions	4:29
18.	"I Don't Know" (hidden track)	previously unreleased; outtake from the Pleased to Meet Me sessions	3:07
Total length:			55:23

On-disc music videos
No.	Title	Length
1.	"The Ledge"	4:07
2.	"Achin' to Be"	3:41
Total length:		7:48
