= Dead Man's Pop =

2019 box set by the Replacements

Box set by The Replacements
- Released: September 27, 2019
- Recorded: June 2, 1989
- Venue: University of Wisconsin-Milwaukee
- Genre: Alternative rock
- Label: Rhino

The Replacements chronology
For Sale: Live at Maxwell's 1986 (2017)	Dead Man's Pop (2019)	Pleased to Meet Me Deluxe Edition (2020)

Professional ratings
Review scores
Source	Rating
Allmusic	4/5 stars

Dead Man's Pop is a box set by The Replacements released by Rhino Entertainment on September 27, 2019. The box set includes a remix of the band's 1989 album, Don't Tell a Soul known as Don't Tell a Soul Redux, mixed by the album's original producer, Matt Wallace. Also included is a disc of rarities and unreleased tracks called We Know the Night: Rare and Unreleased which contains early versions of songs from the Don't Tell a Soul album and songs recorded with singer Tom Waits. The last two discs are a live album called The Complete Inconcerated Live, which expands upon the 1989 promotional EP, Inconcerated Live. The show was recorded at the University of Wisconsin-Milwaukee on June 2, 1989.

On July 23, 2019, the band released the first track, a remixed version of "Talent Show."

On August 16, 2019, the band released the second track, the Bearsville recording of "Achin' to Be."

The band's biographist Bob Mehr received the Best Album Notes award at the 63rd Annual Grammy Awards in 2021 for his liner notes on Dead Man's Pop.

== Track listing ==
All tracks are written by Paul Westerberg, except where noted.

Disc 1 & LP: Don't Tell a Soul Redux
No.	Title	Writer(s)	Length
1.	"Talent Show" (Matt Wallace Mix)		3:55
2.	"I'll Be You" (Matt Wallace Mix)		3:29
3.	"We'll Inherit the Earth" (Matt Wallace Mix)		4:15
4.	"Achin' to Be" (Matt Wallace Mix)		3:39
5.	"Darlin' One" (Matt Wallace Mix)	Paul Westerberg, Slim Dunlap, Chris Mars, Tommy Stinson	3:38
6.	"Back to Back" (Matt Wallace Mix)		3:21
7.	"I Won't" (Matt Wallace Mix)		2:55
8.	"Asking Me Lies" (Matt Wallace Mix)		3:39
9.	"They're Blind" (Matt Wallace Mix)		5:24
10.	"Anywhere's Better Than Here" (Matt Wallace Mix)		3:00
11.	"Rock 'n' Roll Ghost" (Matt Wallace Mix)		3:23

Disc 2: We Know The Night: Rare & Unreleased
No.	Title	Writer(s)	Length
1.	"Portland" (Alternate Mix) (Bearsville Version)		5:16
2.	"Achin' to Be" (Bearsville Version)		3:23
3.	"I'll Be You" (Bearsville Version)		3:26
4.	"Wake Up" (Alternate Mix) (Bearsville Version)		2:14
5.	"We’ll Inherit The Earth" (Bearsville Version)		4:17
6.	"Last Thing In The World"		3:10
7.	"They’re Blind" (Bearsville Version)		5:10
8.	"Rock 'n' Roll Ghost" (Bearsville Version)		3:31
9.	"Darlin' One" (Bearsville Version)	Paul Westerberg, Slim Dunlap, Chris Mars, Tommy Stinson	3:52
10.	"Talent Show" (Demo Version)		2:53
11.	"Dance On My Planet"		3:01
12.	"We Know the Night" (Alternate Outtake)		3:43
13.	"Ought To Get Love" (Alternate Mix)		3:03
14.	"Gudbuy T'Jane" (Outtake)	Noddy Holder, Jim Lea	3:31
15.	"Lowdown Monkey Blues" (Featuring Tom Waits)		6:44
16.	"If Only You Were Lonely" (Featuring Tom Waits)		4:18
17.	"We Know The Night" (Rehearsal) (Featuring Tom Waits)		4:11
18.	"We Know The Night" (Full Band Version) (Featuring Tom Waits)		4:04
19.	"I Can Help" (Featuring Tom Waits)	Billy Swan	3:03
20.	"Date to Church" (Matt Wallace Remix)		5:04

Disc 3: The Complete Inconcerated Live, Part 1
No.	Title	Writer(s)	Length
1.	"Alex Chilton" (Live)		3:44
2.	"Talent Show" (Live)		3:37
3.	"Back To Back" (Live)		3:25
4.	"I Don’t Know" (Live)		3:14
5.	"The Ledge" (Live)		4:13
6.	"Waitress In The Sky" (Live)		2:07
7.	"Anywhere's Better Than Here" (Live)		2:36
8.	"Nightclub Jitters" (Live)		3:44
9.	"Cruella De Ville" (Live)	Mel Leven	2:47
10.	"Achin' To Be" (Live)		4:12
11.	"Asking Me Lies" (Live)		3:39
12.	"Bastards of Young" (Live)		3:25
13.	"Answering Machine" (Live)		3:25
14.	"Little Mascara" (Live)		3:48
15.	"I'll Be You" (Live)		3:15

Disc 4: The Complete Inconcerated Live, Part 2
No.	Title	Writer(s)	Length
1.	"Darlin' One" (Live)	Paul Westerberg, Slim Dunlap, Chris Mars, Tommy Stinson	4:36
2.	"I Will Dare" (Live)		3:34
3.	"Another Girl, Another Planet" (Live)	Peter Perrett	3:06
4.	"I Won’t" (Live)		3:31
5.	"Unsatisfied" (Live)		3:30
6.	"We’ll Inherit The Earth" (Live)		4:37
7.	"Can't Hardly Wait" (Live)		3:21
8.	"Color Me Impressed" (Live)		2:36
9.	"Born to Lose" (Live)	Johnny Thunders	3:01
10.	"Never Mind" (Live)		4:34
11.	"Here Comes A Regular" (Live)		5:19
12.	"Valentine" (Live)		3:23
13.	"Left Of The Dial" (Live)		3:59
14.	"Black Diamond" (Live)	Paul Stanley	3:19

== Charts ==
Chart (2019)	Peak position
US Billboard 200	171
