= Robert Dunlap =

Robert Dunlap may refer to:

- Robert Dunlap (playwright) (1766–1839), American playwright
- Robert P. Dunlap (1794–1859), governor of Maine
- Robert H. Dunlap (1879–1931), United States Marine Corps brigadier general
- Robert Rankin Dunlap (1915–1992), American lawyer and politician
- Robert Hugo Dunlap (1920–2000), United States Marine Corps, World War II Medal of Honor recipient
- Slim Dunlap (Robert Bruce Dunlap, 1951–2024), American rock musician
