= Merry Go Round (The Replacements song) =

1990 single by the Replacements

Single by The Replacements

from the album All Shook Down
- Released: August 1990
- Recorded: 1990
- Genre: Alternative rock
- Length: 3:29
- Label: Sire/Reprise
- Songwriter(s): Paul Westerberg
- Producer(s): Scott Litt

The Replacements singles chronology
"Achin' to Be" (1989)	"Merry Go Round" (1990)	"Someone Take the Wheel" (1990)

"Merry Go Round" is a song by American alternative rock band the Replacements, from their 1990 studio album All Shook Down. Written by lead singer Paul Westerberg, the song features lyrics inspired by his relationship with his younger sister Mary as well as a drumming performance by Charley Drayton instead of the band's drummer Chris Mars (though the latter did appear in the music video for the song).

The song became the band's most successful single on the alternative rock charts, staying at number one for four weeks on the Modern Rock Tracks chart. It has since seen positive critical reception.

== Background ==
Lyrically, the song was inspired by Westerberg's relationship with his younger sister Mary. Replacements frontman Paul Westerberg commented on the song's downbeat lyrics, "It's the kind of character I tend to be interested in. The winners in life don't attract me. I've never been able to get a handle on that, I've tried to write [songs about winners], but they always ring false. It's ... just a slogan to pat yourself on the back and kid yourself that it's all gonna be all right. 'We're gonna make it.' That emotion has never been strong with me. I've always been kinda defeatist! A lot of it does come from drink. I didn't stop drinking in the hope that now I'd have a positive outlook on life. But at least maybe I'll be able to see some glimmers of the other side of life."

The song was one of two on the album to feature Charley Drayton on drums as opposed to Replacements drummer Chris Mars, who had been estranged from the band during the recording of All Shook Down. The band had actively sought Drayton and were pleased with his performance: bassist Tommy Stinson later commented on the groove the band achieved with Drayton, "I thought, Jesus, if we had that kind of thing going on, we would be big." The band offered to have Drayton join the band full-time, but he declined.

At a musical level, Westerberg said, "'Merry Go Round' is really just 'Achin' to Be' in a different key."

== Release ==
"Merry Go Round" was released as the debut single from the band's 1990 album All Shook Down. It became the band's second alternative number one hit after "I'll Be You", topping the Modern Rock Tracks chart for four non-consecutive weeks and thus becoming the band's biggest alternative charts hit. However, the single failed to crack the Billboard Hot 100.

To promote the single, a music video for "Merry Go Round" was produced. Directed by Bob Dylan's son Jesse and filmed on a Hollywood soundstage, the video featured the band plainly performing the song, without the chaos that had defined previous Replacements videos. Guitarist Slim Dunlap appeared in the video, as did drummer Chris Mars, despite not performing on the studio cut of the track.

== Critical reception ==
"Merry Go Round" has generally seen positive critical reception and has been denoted as a highlight of All Shook Down. Diffuser.fm wrote, "The steady 'Merry-Go-Round' has a nice hook and Paul's sleeve-hearted storytelling is solid." Inlander named the song as being "among the band's best," while Pitchfork called it a "pretty good song." Glide described the song as "swaggering" and "delightfully catchy."

== Charts ==
Chart (1990)	Peak position
US Billboard Modern Rock Tracks	1

== See also ==
- List of Billboard number-one alternative singles of the 1990s
