= Love in vein =

Love in vein, Love in veins, or Love in vain may refer to:

== Music ==
- "Love in Vein", a song by Skinny Puppy on the album Last Rights
- "Love in Veins", a song by Ian McCullough on the album Slideling
- "Love in Vain", a blues song by Robert Johnson
- "Love in Vain", a song on The Ruts single, "Staring at the Rude Bois"

== Other uses ==
- "Love in Vein", an episode of the television program, Dark Angel
- "Love in Vain", an episode of the X-Men animated series
- Love in Vein, an anthology series edited by Poppy Z. Brite
