= Ordinary World (film) =

2016 American comedy-drama film

- Theatrical release poster
- Directed by: Lee Kirk
- Written by: Lee Kirk
- Produced by: Alex A. Ginzburg; Tony Lee; Tim Perell
- Starring: Billie Joe Armstrong; Fred Armisen; Judy Greer; Selma Blair; Chris Messina; Brian Baumgartner; Kevin Corrigan
- Cinematography: Scott Miller
- Edited by: Stephen Haren
- Music by: Dickon Hinchliffe; Billie Joe Armstrong
- Production companies: Let It Play; Process Media
- Distributed by: Universal Pictures
- Release dates: April 23, 2016 (Tribeca); October 14, 2016 (United States)
- Running time: 86 minutes
- Country: United States
- Language: English

Ordinary World is a 2016 American comedy-drama film written and directed by Lee Kirk, starring Billie Joe Armstrong in his first lead acting role. The cast includes Judy Greer, Selma Blair, Madisyn Shipman, Dallas Roberts, Chris Messina, Fred Armisen, Brian Baumgartner, and Kevin Corrigan. The film follows Perry, a former punk musician who has since settled down, as he navigates a midlife crisis spurred by his 40th birthday.

Kirk conceived Ordinary World after having his first child in 2011, wishing to explore how parenthood can change a person. He met Armstrong through the latter's talent agent, and the two developed the story over the course of nine months. Armstrong contributed four songs to the film. Principal photography for Ordinary World occurred in New York City, starting in late 2014 and lasting three weeks.

Ordinary World originally screened at the Tribeca Festival in 2016, then titled Geezer. It later received a theatrical release on October 14, 2016 by Universal Pictures, and was released for home media the same day. The film received mixed reviews from film critics, who praised Armstrong's performance and music while criticizing its story and character writing.

== Plot ==
Perry Miller is a former punk rock musician who has since settled down with his wife Karen, his daughter Salome, and a newborn child. On the day of his daughter's talent show, Perry is disappointed when he believes nobody remembered that it is also his 40th birthday. He picks up a new guitar for Salome before arriving for work at his family's hardware store. Perry's younger brother Jake, who runs the store, lectures him about his apathy towards his job until Perry tells him that nobody has remembered his birthday. Jake gives Perry the day off and $1000, hoping that Perry will let loose for his birthday and overcome his apathy.

Perry decides to throw a reunion party for his old band. He finds a nice hotel where he runs into Christy, an old girlfriend who has since become Joan Jett's manager. Perry purchases the presidential suite from the hotel's owner, Rupert, for a day. He then invites his bandmates Gary, Johnny, and Pete to the party; soon after they arrive, Karen reminds him that he promised to let his in-laws into his house, and he returns home. His in-laws, after chastising Perry about his lack of ambition in life, remind Perry that he left Salome's guitar at work, so he then goes to the hardware store to fetch it.

There, Perry interrupts a meeting between Jake and his lawyer as they are discussing buying out Perry's share of the family business. Jake reveals that he already consulted Karen on the matter; Perry, who was unaware of the plan, leaves feeling betrayed. He returns to the hotel, where Rupert reminds him of the hotel's strict "no-party" policy. Perry finds that his former bandmates have filled the suite with strangers; he angrily confronts Gary, who accuses him of being "no fun anymore". Perry retreats to the bedroom to take a nap, and is woken up by Christy. The two reminisce, but Perry backs off when Christy tries to kiss him. He decides to play for her a song he wrote, "Ordinary World", but is interrupted when Gary tells Perry that their band is about to perform.

Perry is excited to perform with his band again, however Gary reveals that they recruited a new singer in his absence. Infuriated, Perry smashes Salome's guitar as the police arrive to stop the party and detain him. Perry confronts Gary about being replaced in the band; Gary says he was forced to when Perry left the band before a tour because of Karen being pregnant. The two reconcile. Perry is released from custody and rushes to Salome's talent show; Christy runs after him and offers to let him play "Ordinary World" for Joan Jett to revive his music career, but Perry refuses.

Perry makes it to the talent show in time to watch Salome, forced to use his old guitar, perform a cover of "Unsatisfied". At home, Perry and Karen argue, culminating in him revealing that he spent several thousand dollars for his birthday. Karen angrily reveals that his actual birthday is the next day; he had confused the dates by thinking his birthday was on the same day as Salome's talent show, despite the show being moved back a day.

Later that night, Karen's father thanks Perry for taking care of her; Perry subsequently makes up with Karen, as the two discuss the difficulties of parenthood. The next day, Perry takes Salome to a guitar shop to trade his old, prized guitar for a new guitar for her. The shop owner also tapes up an advertisement for Perry's guitar lessons. On the car ride home, Salome and Karen enthusiastically request to hear a song from Perry's old band, and he loads a CD as Karen wishes him a happy birthday.

== Cast ==
- Billie Joe Armstrong as Perry Miller
- Selma Blair as Karen Miller
- Judy Greer as Christy
- Chris Messina as Jake Miller
- Fred Armisen as Gary
- John Doman as Walt
- Brian Baumgartner as Rupert
- Madisyn Shipman as Salome Miller
- Dallas Roberts as Mickey
- Kevin Corrigan as Pete
- Sean Gunn as Ted
- Lucas Papaelias as Johnny
- Joan Jett as herself

== Production ==
=== Development ===
Lee Kirk's debut film, The Giant Mechanical Man, premiered at the Tribeca Festival in 2012. During the four-year production of The Giant Mechanical Man, Kirk fell in love with and married Jenna Fischer, who produced and acted in that film; the couple had their first child in September 2011. Around this time, Kirk began developing Ordinary World, with one of its themes being the ways that having a child changes a person. He called the theme the "most obvious thing to be writing about," as he was stuck at home following the birth of his son. Kirk turning 40 years old a few weeks after his son's birth also played a role in Ordinary World's development. He found the theme of turning 40 to be a "fertile area to work in", positing that people that age were "over that hump of having kids" and thus prone to reflecting on their lives.

Billie Joe Armstrong is the lead singer of the American rock band Green Day. According to Armstrong, he "caught the acting bug" after playing St. Jimmy in American Idiot (2010–2011), the Broadway musical based on the band's music, and continued to take small acting roles from there. His talent agent connected him with Kirk, and Armstrong accepted the role after reading the script for Ordinary World. The two proceeded to workshop the movie over the course of nine months, rehearsing and rewriting scenes. For instance, Kirk recalled rewriting the character played by Judy Greer from a prostitute to a former girlfriend on Armstrong's suggestion, and running lines through Armstrong to give them a "rock-and-roll vernacular". Kirk also refined Armstrong's acting prior to filming, to prepare him for his first leading role.

=== Music ===
Armstrong wrote four songs for Ordinary World, including "Devil's Kind" and "Ordinary World". Regarding the latter, Kirk initially asked Armstrong to write a song "thinking about the past and trying to reconcile", to soundtrack a scene where his character sang to Greer's. After Armstrong penned the song, Kirk instead decided that the song should be about "family and simplicity of life". This led Armstrong to write "Ordinary World"; it was later included as the final track on Green Day's twelfth studio album, Revolution Radio (2016).

Both of Armstrong's sons contributed music to Ordinary World: Jakob Armstrong, his younger son, contributed "King of the World" to the soundtrack, and Joey Armstrong, his older son, likewise contributed a song via his band SWMRS. Joey also appeared within a party scene in the film. In addition, the film includes a cover of "Unsatisfied" by the Replacements. Both Kirk and Armstrong said that the song held significance for them, with the former saying that "a father listening to that song and realizing he was satisfied" was his "first image" while writing the film.

=== Casting and filming ===
Armstrong insisted that music played in the movie be done live, rather than being lip-synched, to differentiate it from other music movies. This led to Fred Armisen, Lucas Papelias, and Kevin Corrigan being cast as Armstrong's bandmembers, due to their ability to play instruments. Kirk further speculated that Armisen, Chris Messina, Greer, and Selma Blair all joined the cast to work with Armstrong. In addition, Armstrong arranged the cameo appearance by Joan Jett via text message. Principal photography for Ordinary World occurred in New York City, starting in late 2014 and lasting 21 days. The scene featuring Armstrong serenading Greer's character was allotted half a day; Kirk noted that the group recorded the scene multiple times to "get the intimacy right and get the feel of the song right". For another scene, Kirk noted that Armstrong smashed eight guitars over various takes. Armstrong later described the film's budget as being "super low".

== Release ==
On May 14, 2015, Deadline Hollywood announced that Hyde Park International would facilitate international sales of Ordinary World at the Marché du Film, while Gersh would facilitate North American rights. Ordinary World first screened at the Tribeca Festival on April 23, 2016, titled Geezer. Following the premiere, Armstrong, Tré Cool, and Jesse Malin performed a short set at Spring Studios in New York City, featuring two songs from the film, two songs by Green Day, and a cameo appearance by Joan Jett to perform a medley of "American Idiot" (2004) and "Bad Reputation" (1980).

After Armstrong told Kirk that he wanted to put "Ordinary World" on Revolution Radio, Armstrong suggested that the title of the film be changed to Ordinary World, and the change was made. Later that year, it was announced that Universal Pictures would release the movie in theaters on October 14, and that Universal Pictures Home Entertainment would release the film for DVD, video on demand, and television the same day. Ordinary World grossed an estimated $40,955 in DVD sales and $53,716 in Blu-ray sales, according to The Numbers.

== Critical reception ==
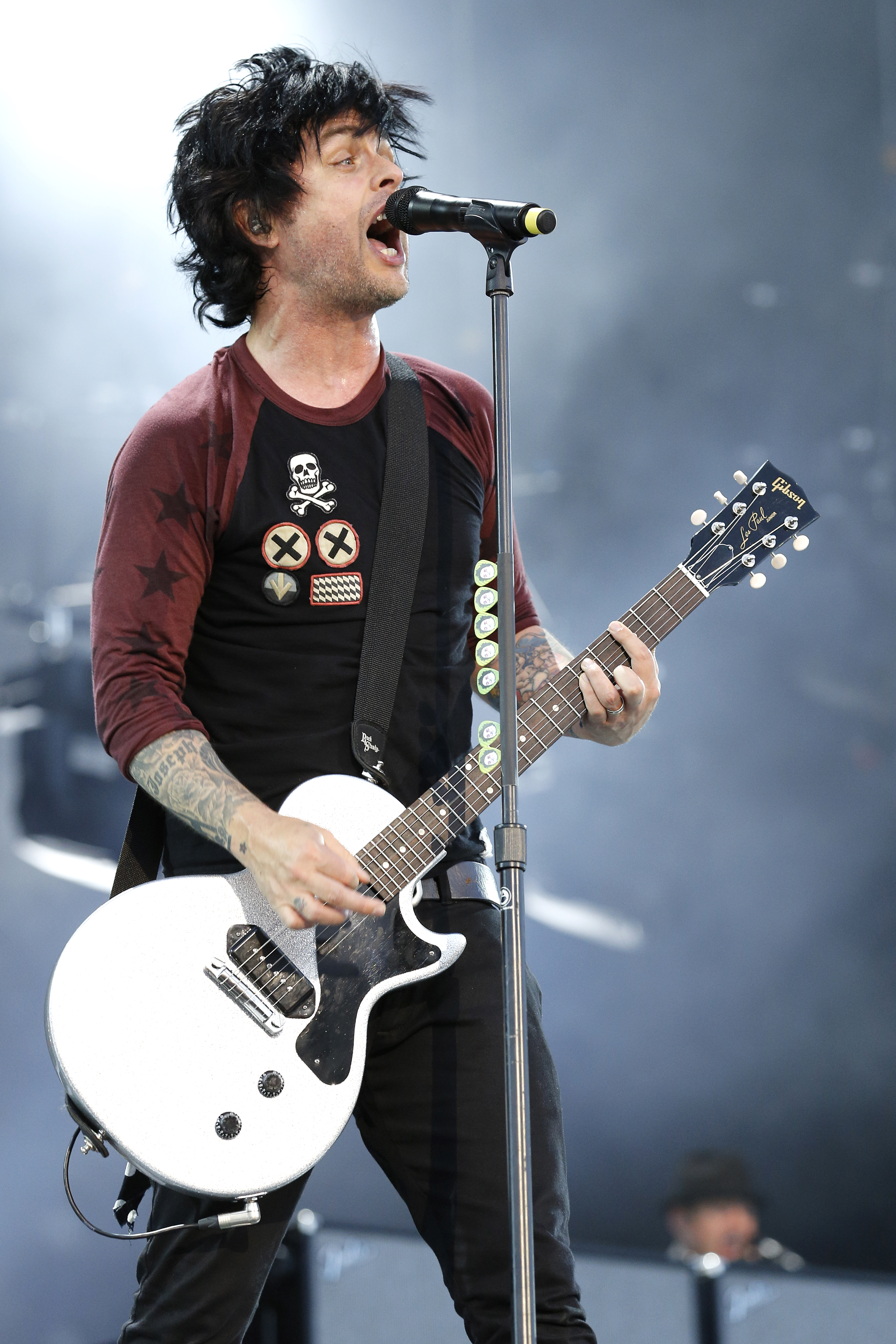
Billie Joe Armstrong's (pictured in 2013) performance was generally praised by film critics.

Ordinary World received mixed reviews from critics. On Rotten Tomatoes it has a score of 47% based on 14 reviews, with an average rating of 5.3/10. Metacritic, which uses a weighted average, assigned the film a score of 55 out of 100, based on 7 critics, indicating "mixed or average" reviews.

Critics faulted the movie for being formulaic, having a thin plot, and having poor character writing. Neil Genzlinger of the New York Times wrote that the film became a "predictable midlife-crisis yarn" despite a strong start, and that it relied on tropes instead of exploring new ideas. Similarly, Katie Walsh of the Los Angeles Times and Matthew Passantino of MXDWN criticized Ordinary World's plot for being unoriginal; both also added that Perry's characterization lacked nuance, with the former writing that his character motivations were inscrutable beyond "a vague sense of suburban malaise". Writing for Common Sense Media, Jeffrey Anderson panned Perry's character for lacking depth, and noted how the other characters felt as though they "exist only to react to [Perry]".

Nerdist's Derrick Rossignol compared Ordinary World to a "weaker Judd Apatow entry" for its forgettable plot and its lack of compelling character; NJ.com's Stephen Whitty compared it to "a hit TV show on Disney" like Hannah Montana, criticizing it for having stale jokes and "no truth and no consequences". In contrast, Tom Keogh of The Seattle Times called the film a "gentle, Gen-X take on harsher movies about family men adrift from daily life", and identified one of the movie's strengths being that it lacked a clear but far-fetched resolution to Perry's internal angst. The Hollywood Reporter's Frank Scheck characterized the film as an "enjoyable if slight diversion", and Film Journal International's Maitland McDonagh wrote that the film improved as it went on, ending as a "surprisingly touching portrait" of Perry's character.

Critics generally praised Armstrong's performance and emphasized its strong casting. (Note: Attributed to Neil Genzlinger of The New York Times, Derrick Rossignol of Nerdist, Stephen Whitty of NJ.com, Tom Keogh of The Seattle Times, and Thea de Gallier of Louder Sound.) Michael Nordine of the Village Voice identified Armstrong's performance as one of the main reasons Ordinary World was compelling, and Scheck further asserted that the juxtaposition between Armstrong's dramatic public image and the subdued character he played lent the film much of its comedy. On the other hand, Anderson criticized Armstrong's performance despite noting it had a "certain shabby appeal", and Passantino found Armstrong "awkward and unconvincing" as Perry. Walsh praised the chemistry between Armstrong and Shipman; McDonagh thought Shipman's performance stood out amongst a strong cast, praising its charm in light of the "ubiquitous[ly] smug, smart-mouthed spawn of Nickelodeon". Several critics also praised the music of Ordinary World, with Genzlinger and Walsh both calling it one of the movie's only highlights.
