= For Sale: Live at Maxwell's 1986 =

2017 live album by the Replacements

Live album by the Replacements
- Released: October 6, 2017
- Recorded: February 4, 1986
- Venues: Maxwell's, Hoboken, New Jersey, United States
- Genre: Alternative rock
- Length: 1:22:36
- Label: Rhino
- Producer: Bob Mehr

The Replacements chronology
Songs for Slim (2013)	For Sale: Live at Maxwell's 1986 (2017)	Dead Man's Pop (2019)

Professional ratings
Aggregate scores
Source	Rating
Metacritic	86/100
Review scores
Source	Rating
AllMusic	4.5/5 stars
American Songwriter	4/5 stars
Pitchfork	8.7/10

For Sale: Live at Maxwell's 1986 is a 2017 double live album by the American alternative rock band the Replacements. Recorded at Maxwell's at the height of the band's commercial and creative arc, it is one of the few good recordings of their live performances. The band's only previous live album—1985's The Shit Hits the Fans—was a limited cassette tape release which features poor audio quality and several false starts and stops on songs. In 2007, bassist Tommy Stinson stated that "There are no good Replacements live recordings", in part due to a lack of high-quality recordings and in part due to the band's notoriously sloppy performances due to alcohol abuse. The album was produced by Bob Mehr, who wrote the 2016 biography of the band, Trouble Boys: The True Story of the Replacements.

== Recording ==
The album was recorded with a mobile recording studio as an attempt to market the band by Seymour Stein of Sire/Warner Bros. Records but was canceled after guitarist Bob Stinson left the band a few months later.

== Track listing ==
All tracks are written by Paul Westerberg, except where noted.

Side A
No.	Title	Writer(s)	Length
1.	"Hayday"		2:49
2.	"Color Me Impressed"		2:41
3.	"Dose of Thunder"	Westerberg, Chris Mars, Tommy Stinson	2:37
4.	"Fox on the Run"	Brian Connolly, Steve Priest, Andy Scott, Mick Tucker	1:10
5.	"Hold My Life"		4:36
6.	"I Will Dare"		3:54
7.	"Favorite Thing"	T. Stinson, B. Stinson, Mars	2:21

Side B
No.	Title	Writer(s)	Length
8.	"Unsatisfied"		2:52
9.	"Can't Hardly Wait"		3:19
10.	"Tommy Gets His Tonsils Out"	Westerberg, T. Stinson, B. Stinson, Mars	2:10
11.	"Takin' A Ride"		2:45
12.	"Bastards of Young"		3:45
13.	"Kiss Me on the Bus"		4:04
14.	"Black Diamond"	Paul Stanley	3:07

Side C
No.	Title	Length
15.	"Johnny's Gonna Die"	3:53
16.	"Otto"	2:06
17.	"I'm In Trouble"	3:12
18.	"Left of the Dial"	3:25
19.	"God Damn Job"	1:35
20.	"Answering Machine"	3:06
21.	"Waitress in the Sky"	2:26
22.	"Take Me Down to the Hospital"	3:58

Side D
No.	Title	Writer(s)	Length
23.	"Gary's Got a Boner"		2:40
24.	"If Only You Were Lonely"		2:56
25.	"Baby Strange"	Marc Bolan	2:48
26.	"Hitchin' a Ride"	Peter Callander, Mitch Murray	2:49
27.	"Nowhere Man"	John Lennon, Paul McCartney	2:58
28.	"Go"		3:03
29.	"Fuck School"	Westerberg, T. Stinson, B. Stinson, Mars	1:57
Total length:			82:36

== Charts ==
Chart (2017)	Peak position
US Billboard 200	52
US Top Alternative Albums (Billboard)	6
US Top Rock Albums (Billboard)	9
