= Channel Z (song) =

1989 single by the B-52's

Single by the B-52's

from the album Cosmic Thing
- B-side: "Junebug"
- Released: 1989
- Studio: Bearsville (Woodstock, New York)
- Genre: Rock; dance-rock; funk rock; pop
- Length: 4:49
- Label: Reprise
- Songwriter: The B-52's
- Producer: Don Was

The B-52's singles chronology
"Wig" (1987)	"Channel Z" (1989)	"Love Shack" (1989)

"Channel Z" is a song by American rock band the B-52's from their fifth studio album, Cosmic Thing (1989).

== Release ==
The song was the first single from Cosmic Thing but its success was limited. Multiple renditions of the song were released, including the album version and a 7-inch single edit and remix, as well as a "rock mix" and a "rock dub" which were on a five-track CD single in the United States.

In 1990, after the success of the follow-ups "Love Shack" and "Roam" the single was reissued with a new 12-inch mix.

== Meaning ==
Fred Schneider told an interviewer in 2008 that the song was "probably our most straightforward political song up until then ... It was about the state of the country [at the time]. And who knew nearly 20 years later it'd be worse?"

== Critical reception ==
Music critic Stephen Thomas Erlewine described it as "a fine song that effortlessly updated the classic B-52's sound", adding that "it made for a good single and still stands as one of their better songs of the era."

== Chart performance ==
In the United States, "Channel Z" topped the Billboard Modern Rock Tracks chart in August 1989. In Belgium, it reached the top 50, peaking at number 43 on the Ultratop chart. The song peaked at number 61 on the UK Singles Chart following the 12-inch release in 1990.

== Music video ==
The song's music video features the B-52's playing on stage in front of an audience, along with clips of them running through a forest. It was shot outside of New York City according to the credits of The B-52's 1979–1989.

== Charts ==
Chart (1989–1990)	Peak position
Belgium (Ultratop 50 Flanders)	43
UK Singles (OCC)	61
US Alternative Airplay (Billboard)	1

== Release history ==
Region	Date	Format(s)	Label(s)	Ref.
United States	1989	12-inch vinyl	Reprise	
United Kingdom	August 6, 1990	7-inch vinyl; 12-inch vinyl; cassette	Reprise	

== See also ==
- List of Billboard number-one alternative singles of the 1980s
