= Love Shack =

1989 dance song by the B-52's

- Cover art for US editions

Single by the B-52's

from the album Cosmic Thing
- B-side: "Channel Z"
- Released: June 20, 1989
- Studio: Dreamland (West Hurley, New York)
- Genre: Pop rock; dance-rock; funk rock; surf rock; new wave
- Length: 5:21 (album version); 4:15 (single edit)
- Label: Reprise
- Songwriter: The B-52's
- Producer: Don Was

The B-52's singles chronology
"Channel Z" (1989)	"Love Shack" (1989)	"Roam" (1989)

Audio sample
- file; help

Music video
- "Love Shack" on YouTube

"Love Shack" is a song by American new wave band the B-52's from their fifth studio album, Cosmic Thing (1989). It was released on June 20, 1989, by Reprise Records, and was produced by Don Was. The song was a comeback for the band, following their decline in popularity in the mid-1980s and the death of guitarist Ricky Wilson in 1985.

"Love Shack" is considered one of the band's signature songs and has been a concert staple since its release. Commercially, the single topped the charts of Australia, Ireland, and New Zealand and reached number two on the UK singles chart, number three on the US Billboard Hot 100 (becoming their first top-40 hit), and number five on the Canadian RPM 100 Singles chart. Its accompanying music video was directed by Adam Bernstein and won an award at the 1990 MTV Video Music Awards. The song was later named one of the 365 Songs of the Century by the Recording Industry Association of America and one of the 500 Greatest Songs of All Time by Rolling Stone.

== Background ==
The genesis of the song came from B-52's frontman Fred Schneider, and was inspired by a club outside of Athens, Georgia, called the Hawaiian Ha-Le: "It was an African-American club that had a lot of good shows. It looked like a shack, you wouldn't expect it to be what it was, and when you opened the door, it was a wild band playing." Kate Pierson stated that it was "kind of like the juke joint in The Color Purple", and that the band would hang out there with a large "bohemian" group of friends. Cindy Wilson added, "It used to be this funky building with a tin roof that was old and rusty. They would have Soul Train [dance] lines."

Another inspiration for the song was thought to be a cabin near Athens with a tin roof, where the band had conceived "Rock Lobster", a single from their 1979 debut album. The five-room cabin, which was located on a dairy farm, had once been rented by Pierson and her then-husband, after they had relocated to Athens in the 1970s. Author Mats Sexton recalled that Pierson had stated several of the band's early songs were conceived in the cabin through jamming, including "many different guitar riffs and assorted lyrics". The cabin, which was on the cusp of being reoccupied and renovated, burned down on December 16, 2004.

== Composition and recording ==
The song was the last to be recorded for the Cosmic Thing album and was devised when the band's sessions with producer Don Was finished a day early. The band had a 15-minute long piece that was undeveloped and presented it to Was, who suggested integrating another piece they'd been improvising about a "love shack" as the song's chorus. Pierson later recalled, "It wasn't even gonna make the album because it wasn't solidified. But after we added that chorus, Bingo, here it is; it sounds like a hit. But we didn't aim to write hits, we aimed to heal ourselves and channel Ricky [Wilson]'s spirit. That was the goal, and I knew his presence was there." The section that begins "the love shack is a little old place where..." was initially only in the song once, but both Pierson and Was felt it should repeat, although Schneider disagreed.

Wilson's line "tin roof rusted" originated from a jam session for the song, where the band were rehearsing along with pre-recorded instrumentation. Wilson was yelling the line as the backing tape stopped, which the band found amusing and thought provided a suitable ending. Wilson later elaborated, "It was just a vision in my head of my love shack." While there has been speculation about the meaning of the line, Pierson has also corroborated that the line is literally referencing a rusted tin roof. Wilson mused, "It's amazing what people have come up with in the past about it. I kind of like that. Let the people participate in the meaning. I'm fine with that." According to Was, Wilson's performance of the "tin roof rusted" line in the song's first proper recording session had an "exuberance that shocked everybody ... she infused it with so much feeling, it threw everybody." After further attempts to re-record it failed to recreate the same "manic energy", Was decided he would keep the take and punch in the remainder of the song.

During the recording of one take, a lightning storm caused the power to go out in the studio during the breakdown section, which put the session temporarily on hold. When the band reconvened, they realized the incomplete take was so good that they would keep it and splice it together with another take.

== Reception ==
I had to go with our A&R person, bless her heart, and beg radio stations to play it — they thought it was too weird. We felt 'Love Shack' was probably the most accessible commercial thing we'd ever done, and finally they started playing it, and it made it all the way to No. 3 on the Billboard charts.

— Fred Schneider; Entertainment Weekly magazine, 2018

=== Commercial ===
"Love Shack" became the band's biggest hit song as well as their first million-copy seller. It was the band's first song to reach the top 40 on the US Billboard Hot 100, peaking at number three in November 1989, and spending a total of 27 weeks on the chart. It also reached number five in Canada, number two in the United Kingdom, and number one in Australia (eight weeks), Ireland (one week) and New Zealand (four weeks), as well as on the Billboard Modern Rock Tracks chart (four weeks).

=== Critical ===
Caren Myers from Melody Maker said, "This wins hands down on packaging of the week, as it comes in a fold-out, pop-up love shack that you can brighten your mantelpiece with. The shack is the sort of place that shimmies when people start grooving there. The B-52's are still pretty much making the same frivolous music they always have, but I'd take their joyful silliness over a whole warehouse full of self-conscious iconoclasts any day. Next Thursday would be fine." David Giles from Music Week wrote, "The B-52's deserve a hit after their fine return to form last summer with the Cosmic Thing LP, but I'd be surprised if this is the track to do it." He added, "Like 'Party Out of Bounds', it tries to conjure up a wild, chaotic celebration, but unlike that particular track it is neither inventive nor melodic enough." Pan-European magazine Music & Media named it "the best track from the disappointing Cosmic Thing. Good clean fun from some of the US' most productive eccentrics." Ian McCann from NME felt it was a rip-off of the Miracles' "Going to a Go-Go". People magazine noted the "wild abandon" of the song.

In retrospective reviews, Stephen Thomas Erlewine of AllMusic described it as "an irresistible dance number with delightfully silly lyrics and hooks as big as a whale that unbelievably gave the group a long-awaited Top Ten hit." Matthew Hocter from Albumism cited "Love Shack" as an example of the band's "own unique brand of upbeat, lyrically positive and infectious dance grooves". The Daily Vault's Denise Henderson commented, "The celebration of life in dance and music is demonstrated by the repetitive chorus 'Everybody's movin/everybody's groovin baby!' Well, when in doubt, dancing and drinking and having a little fun always worked for me!"

=== Legacy ===
"Love Shack" was named one of the Recording Industry Association of America's 365 Songs of the Century in 2001. In 2005, Rolling Stone named it the best single of 1989, and in 2010 ranked it 246th on its list of the 500 Greatest Songs of All Time.

== Music video ==
The music video for "Love Shack" was directed by American film, music video and television director Adam Bernstein and shot at the home and studio of ceramic artists Phillip Maberry and Scott Walker in Highland, New York. Bernstein initially wanted to shoot the video in a New York studio but was convinced to relocate once he saw the house.

The video features a cameo from a pre-fame RuPaul in his first mainstream appearance. Pierson later recalled, "we invited all our friends and had a party. ... We started out really early in the morning and it turned into this rave. RuPaul got the dance line going, and it almost felt like we weren't being videotaped." Guitarist Keith Strickland stated that the dance line scene was an homage to the television show Soul Train, and that RuPaul stepped in to direct the scene when Bernstein "didn't get the process". Video artist Tom Rubnitz also appears in the video as the bartender. The video won the award for Best Group Video at the 1990 MTV Video Music Awards.

== Track listings ==
The single release contained different tracks in different countries of release. Some countries, including the United States, had singles backed with "Channel Z", while other releases included live versions of "Planet Claire" and "Rock Lobster" as the B-side recorded at the Cleveland Music Hall (Cleveland, Ohio) on December 2, 1989. In January 1999, the single was released again with a number of remixes, including one by DJ Tonka. Although the re-release did not chart in the United States, it did enter the UK Singles Chart.

=== "Love Shack" ===
- Non-UK 7-inch single

US and Australian cassette single
Japanese mini-CD single

1. "Love Shack" (edit) – 4:15
2. "Channel Z" (LP version) – 4:49
- US 12-inch maxi-single

A1. "Love Shack" (12-inch remix) – 7:58
A2. "Love Shack" (12-inch instrumental) – 6:34
B1. "Love Shack" (12-inch mix) – 6:09
B2. "Love Shack" (Big Radio mix) – 5:32
B3. "Channel Z" (12-inch rock mix) – 6:22

- US maxi-CD single
1. "Love Shack" (12-inch remix) – 7:58
2. "Love Shack" (remix/edit) – 4:02
3. "Channel Z" (12-inch rock mix) – 6:22
4. "Love Shack" (12-inch mix) – 6:09
5. "Love Shack" (a cappella) – 3:54
6. "Love Shack" (Big Radio mix) – 5:32
- Australian 12-inch and maxi-cassette single

A1. "Love Shack" (12-inch remix) – 7:58
A2. "Love Shack" (12-inch instrumental) – 6:34
A3. "Rock Lobster" (original version) – 6:49
B1. "Love Shack" (12-inch mix) – 6:09
B2. "Love Shack" (Big Radio mix) – 5:32
B3. "Channel Z" (12-inch rock mix) – 6:22

- UK 7-inch, CD, and cassette single
1. "Love Shack" – 4:18
2. "Planet Claire" (live) – 5:10
3. "Rock Lobster" (live) – 5:17
- UK 12-inch single

A1. "Love Shack" (12-inch remix)
B1. "Love Shack" (12-inch mix)
B2. "Love Shack" (7-inch version)

=== "Love Shack 99" ===
- UK CD single
1. "Love Shack 99" (radio mix) – 4:39
2. "Love Shack" (DJ Tonka remix) – 6:28
3. "Love Shack" (album version) – 5:21
- UK cassette single
1. "Love Shack 99" (radio mix) – 4:39
2. "Love Shack" (album version) – 5:21

== Credits and personnel ==
Credits are adapted from the Cosmic Thing album booklet. The Uptown Horns consist of Chris Cioe, Paul Litteral, Arno Hecht, Bob Funk, and Carl Beatty.

Studios

- Recorded analog at Dreamland Recording Studios (West Hurley, New York)
- Pre-produced at Bearsville Studios (Bearsville, New York)
- Mixed analog at Electric Lady (New York City)
- Mastered at Masterdisk (New York City)

Personnel

- The B-52's – writing
  - Fred Schneider – vocals
  - Cindy Wilson – vocals
  - Kate Pierson – vocals, keyboards
  - Keith Strickland – guitar
- Sara Lee – bass guitar
- Charley Drayton – drums
- Uptown Horns – horns
- Don Was – production
- Tom Durack – mixing
- Dave Cook – engineering
- Martin Kunitz – assistant engineering
- Bob Ludwig – mastering

== Charts ==
=== Weekly charts ===
Chart (1989–1990)	Peak position
Australia (ARIA)	1
Belgium (Ultratop 50 Flanders)	12
Belgium (VRT Top 30 Flanders)	9
Canada Top Singles (RPM)	5
Canada Dance/Urban (RPM)	8
Canada Retail Singles (RPM)	3
Europe (Eurochart Hot 100)	5
France (SNEP)	42
Ireland (IRMA)	1
Italy Airplay (Music & Media)	1
Luxembourg (Radio Luxembourg)	1
Netherlands (Dutch Top 40)	18
Netherlands (Single Top 100)	15
New Zealand (Recorded Music NZ)	1
Quebec (ADISQ)	13
UK Singles (Official Charts)	2
US Billboard Hot 100	3
US Alternative Airplay (Billboard)	1
US Dance Club Songs (Billboard)	7
US Dance Singles Sales (Billboard)	11
US Cash Box Top 100	4

"Love Shack 99"

Chart (1999)	Peak position
Scottish Singles Sales (Official Charts)	71
UK Singles (Official Charts)	66

=== Year-end charts ===
Chart (1989)	Position
Australia (ARIA)	98
Canada Top Singles (RPM)	76
US Billboard Hot 100	47
US Modern Rock Tracks (Billboard)	29

Chart (1990)	Position
Australia (ARIA)	10
Europe (Eurochart Hot 100)	83
New Zealand (RIANZ)	24
UK Singles (OCC)	23
US Billboard Hot 100	78

== Certifications ==
Region	Certification	Certified units/sales
Australia (ARIA)	2× Platinum	140,000^{^}
New Zealand (RMNZ)	3× Platinum	90,000^{‡}
United Kingdom (BPI)	Platinum	600,000^{‡}
United States (RIAA)	3× Platinum	3,000,000^{‡}
^{^} Shipments figures based on certification alone.^{‡} Sales+streaming figures based on certification alone.

== Release history ==
Region	Date	Format(s)	Label(s)	Ref.
Europe	June 20, 1989	7-inch vinyl	Reprise	
United States	August 18, 1989	7-inch vinyl; 12-inch vinyl; CD; cassette	Reprise	
Australia	January 15, 1990	CD	Reprise	
Japan	January 25, 1990	Mini-CD	Reprise	
United Kingdom	February 19, 1990	7-inch vinyl; CD	Reprise	
United Kingdom	March 5, 1990	7-inch Love Shack Pack	Reprise	
Japan	April 25, 1990	Mini-album (with "Roam")	Reprise	

== In popular culture ==
- The song was covered in Glee's third-season episode "Heart". The episode, broadcast on Valentines Day, used the song to close the show. The cover, primarily performed by Darren Criss and Chris Colfer, was cited as the highlight of the episode by several critics, and a "rousing" end to the episode.
- In 2016, the song was lip synced by American basketball player Shaquille O'Neal on the television show Lip Sync Battle. Because O'Neal commonly goes by the nickname Shaq, host LL Cool J pointed out that O'Neal was singing a "love song to himself."

== See also ==
- List of Billboard number-one alternative singles of the 1980s
- List of number-one singles in Australia during the 1980s
- List of number-one singles of 1990 (Ireland)
- List of number-one singles from the 1990s (New Zealand)
