= The Old New Me =

Studio album by Slim Dunlap
- Released: 1993
- Studio: 5th Floor
- Genre: Roots rock
- Label: Medium Cool/Twin/Tone
- Producers: Peter Jesperson, Brian Paulson

Slim Dunlap chronology
The Old New Me (1993)	Times Like This (1996)

The Old New Me is the debut album by the American musician and former Replacement Slim Dunlap, released in 1993.

Dunlap promoted the album by opening for Dramarama on a North American tour.

== Production ==
The album was produced by Peter Jesperson and Brian Paulson. It was recorded over four nights, for less than $5,000. Chan Poling and Paul Westerberg contributed to The Old New Me.

Dunlap wrote 10 of the album's 11 songs, closing with a cover of James Burton's "Love Lost". "The Ballad of the Opening Band" was inspired by the Replacements' experience opening for Tom Petty on his Full Moon Fever tour.

== Critical reception ==
Professional ratings
Review scores
Source	Rating
AllMusic	4/5 stars
MusicHound Rock: The Essential Album Guide	3.5/5 stars

Trouser Press wrote: "Singing Exile-era Stones melodies in a pleasantly artless voice that could pass for Keith Richards on a good night, Dunlap chugs back raunch-a-roll energy with earnest effort and an invigorating dose of retro flair." The Los Angeles Times thought that Dunlap "takes the stance of a weathered but wry observer who has seen hard knocks but has kept his compassion and his sense of humor through circumstances that might have left others bitter and jaded." The Star Tribune opined that "it's a refreshing, unpretentious roots-rock excursion with inventive guitar work that grows on you with each listening."

The Philadelphia Inquirer called the album the best of the initial Replacements solo projects, writing that, "when everyone has finished deconstructing Westerberg's lyrics and analyzing his tortured observations, it's The New Old Me they'll come back to for a shot of good old, gut-level rock and roll." USA Today concluded that the album "strips down to rowdy, gut-bucket basics." The Houston Chronicle determined that "Westerberg and his grainy vocals save some of the songs, but otherwise they flash by unobtrusively, with few lyrical or emotional stop signs."

AllMusic called the album "a rootsy, engaging ride," writing that it "ends on a gracefully elegiac note with a guitar instrumental, 'Love Lost'."

== Track listing ==
No.	Title	Length
1.	"Rockin Here Tonight"
2.	"Just for the Hell of It"
3.	"Isn't It?"
4.	"Partners in Crime"
5.	"Taken On (the Chin)"
6.	"From the Git Go"
7.	"Busted Up"
8.	"Ain't Exactly Good"
9.	"The King & Queen"
10.	"The Ballad of the Opening Band"
11.	"Love Lost"
