= Unsatisfied =

1984 single by the Replacements

Song by The Replacements

from the album Let It Be
- Released: 2 October 1984
- Genre: Jangle pop; college rock
- Length: 4:01
- Label: Twin/Tone Records
- Songwriter: Paul Westerberg
- Producers: Steve Fjelstad; Peter Jesperson; Paul Westerberg

"Unsatisfied" is a song written by Paul Westerberg and recorded by his band the Replacements for their third studio album Let It Be (1984). Revolving around the central lyric "I'm so unsatisfied," the song was largely fleshed out in the studio and featured improvised guitar lines from guitarist Bob Stinson.

Though not released as a single, the song has become one of the Replacements' most acclaimed songs, being lauded by music writers and frequently appearing in the band's live setlists.

== Background ==
"Unsatisfied" was written by the band's frontman, Paul Westerberg. Westerberg described the mode of the song as being as "melancholy as we want to get and [still] be alive." The first version of the song Westerberg brought into the studio was largely unfinished and, aside from the central "I'm so unsatisfied" lyric, the song was largely improvised in the studio. Guitarist Bob Stinson joined midway on the song when it was being recorded and, despite having not heard it before, began contributing guitar licks to the song. Westerberg recalled:

We ran through it one time. Then [Bob] came in and played along for about half of it. Steve [Fjelstad] rolled the tape, and that was it. That one was really nice because there was no time to think. He played real well on that—reserved, but with emotion.

Westerberg added the song's 12-string guitar introduction and slide guitar parts at subsequent sessions. After the song's release, however, members of the band expressed disapproval of the song's unfinished nature. Bob Stinson asserted, "If we'd put another five minutes' worth of time into it, it would have sounded fifty times better." Westerberg concluded that "Unsatisfied" was "one of the most overrated, half-assed, half-baked songs. It doesn't have nothing but one line."

Author Bob Mehr suggests that the song's central lyric was possibly inspired by Westerberg's interest in palmistry. In a later interview, Westerberg pointed to the tumult of the music business as an influence, stating, "Everybody in the band has cried in the van on the way to the show. ... Sometimes it's like what we're doing is like this funky, weird little dream thing. And that's the kind of stuff, if you let it get to you, it'll really get you down. That's where 'Unsatisfied' came from."

== Personnel ==
Personnel taken from Let It Be liner notes

- Chris Mars – drums
- Bob Stinson – lead guitar
- Tommy Stinson – bass guitar
- Paul Westerberg – vocals, 12-string acoustic rhythm guitar, lapsteel, production

== Release ==
"Unsatisfied" was first released as an album track on the band's 1984 third album, Let It Be. It has also appeared on the compilation album Don't You Know Who I Think I Was?.

"Unsatisfied" would also appear regularly in the band's live setlist. When the band performed on a bill with the Rolling Stones' Keith Richards in 1988, the band dedicated the song to Richards, who had written "(I Can't Get No) Satisfaction". During the band's 1991 tour, the song would sometimes be played in a medley with "Sadly Beautiful", a song from the band's final album All Shook Down. When the band reunited in the 2010s, they performed the song live in 2014 in St. Paul for the first time since reuniting. A live version appears on the 2017 album For Sale: Live at Maxwell's 1986.

== Critical reception ==
Bill Janovitz of AllMusic noted that the song "influenced a generation of bands to follow in the Replacements' wake." KCRW commented, "'Unsatisfied' is to teenage angst what 'Strangers in the Night' is to adult romance." Chicago Tribune dubbed it an "anthem of failure and frustration," while The A.V. Club said the song "may be the perfect synergy between The Replacements' rage and Westerberg's emotionality."

PopMatters ranked the song number one on their list of the best Replacements songs, calling it "absolutely one of the most cathartic rock songs of all time" as well as "the quintessential Replacements/Westerberg song." Diffuser.fm ranked it the band's second best lyric, writing, "'Unsatisfied' stood as an anthem for a legion of depressed and misunderstood teens and college-music fans. It still cuts deep." Ultimate Classic Rock ranked it the band's third best song, writing, "As the songs comes to a close, Westerberg practically shreds his voice in an anguished performance that pulls at the heartstrings." UPROXX named it the band's seventh best song, highlighting Stinson's guitar work as "the loveliest and most restrained guitar of his life."

== Cover versions ==
"Unsatisfied" was covered by the Arizona-based rock band Calexico in 2013. In September 2022, Sunny Day Real Estate's Dan Hoerner announced the band's plans to perform "Unsatisfied" live, stating, "That song totally encapsulates the Sunny Day experience. Never in the history of Sunny Day Real Estate have we covered a song live. But we're going to play 'Unsatisfied' at some point during this tour."
