= Maberry and Walker =

Maberry + Walker (or Phillip Maberry and Scott Walker) live and work as visual artists in the high desert near Joshua Tree, California, United States. The works of Phillip Maberry and Scott Walker have been presented in gallery and museum installations, and are known for an intensely colorful style.

== Personal history ==
In 1990, Phillip Maberry and Scott Walker's home and studio in upstate New York were featured in the iconic B52's video "Love Shack.”. Maberry and Walker also currently work with B-52’s vocalist, Kate Pierson’s “Kate’s Lazy Desert Hotel" (an Airstream trailer hotel) in Mojave Desert outside Joshua Tree, CA in Landers, California.

== Exhibitions and collections ==
Exhibitions include Havu Gallery, Garth Clark Gallery in New York City, Frank Lloyd Gallery in Santa Monica, and the 1983 Whitney Biennial. Their work is included in the permanent collections of the Los Angeles County Museum of Art, the Newark Museum and the Victoria and Albert Museum.
