= The Shit Hits the Fans =

1985 live album by the Replacements

Live album by the Replacements
- Released: January 25, 1985
- Recorded: November 11, 1984
- Length: 51:40
- Label: Twin/Tone

The Replacements chronology
| Tim (1985) | The Shit Hits the Fans (1985) | Boink (1986) |

Professional ratings
Review scores
| Source | Rating |
|---|---|
| Crawdaddy! | Mixed link |
| Robert Christgau | B link |

The Shit Hits the Fans is a Twin/Tone Records (TTR 8443) cassette-only live album by the Replacements, released on January 25, 1985. It was recorded live at The Bowery, Oklahoma City, Oklahoma, on November 11, 1984. The cassette J-Card cover art is by Chris Mars. According to the Twin/Tone website, 10,000 copies were produced, of which 9,276 sold immediately. The rest were given away as promotional copies.

Roscoe Shoemaker, manager and DJ at The Bowery asked Paul Westerberg, if he minded if he recorded the show, to which Westerberg replied, "Why? We suck." Shoemaker hung two microphones from the front of the deejay booth and recorded the show, which was performed in front of approximately 30 patrons (in a venue with a maximum capacity of 1,200 people). Without Shoemaker's knowledge, the tape was removed before the end of the show by soundman Bill Mack, who then gave the tape to the band. Despite Shoemaker having previously asked Westerberg for permission to record the show, both the label and the band denoted it a bootleg, writing in the liner notes, "Anyhoo...what you've got here is most of a live show. Our roadie pulled it out of some enterprising young gent's tape recorder toward the end of the night. (Drop us a line, buddy, there's $3.95 in it for you!)".

Of the twenty-four songs on the album only five songs are actually written by the band. The remaining nineteen are cover versions of songs by other artists, some of which were requested by the small audience. This includes the song "Merry-Go-Round" which was a track from Mötley Crüe's debut album Too Fast for Love, not the similarly named song which would open the Replacements' final studio album All Shook Down. The audio dropout heard during "Hear You Been to College" is caused by Westerberg, who accidentally pressed the record button on a Walkman while listening back to the master copy. If you listen closely he can be heard saying "Stop, 's' enough".

Westerberg said it was "The biggest mistake we ever made. By releasing it, it made people come out to our shows expecting to see a trainwreck every night. And we obliged."

The Bowery was demolished on March 22, 2007.

== Track listing ==
Side one
| No. | Title | Writer(s) | Length |
|---|---|---|---|
| 1. | "Lawdy Miss Clawdy" | Lloyd Price | 1:11 |
| 2. | "Ye Sleeping Knights of Jesus" | Robyn Hitchcock | 2:19 |
| 3. | "Lovelines" | Paul Westerberg, Bob Stinson, Tommy Stinson, Chris Mars | 3:03 |
| 4. | "I'll Be There" | Berry Gordy Jr., Bob West, Hal Davis, Willie Hutch | 3:07 |
| 5. | "Sixteen Blue" | Westerberg | 4:34 |
| 6. | "Can't Hardly Wait" | Westerberg | 3:31 |
| 7. | "I Will Dare" | Westerberg | 3:37 |
| 8. | "Hear You Been to College" | Westerberg, T. Stinson, B. Stinson, Mars | 3:27 |

Side two
| No. | Title | Writer(s) | Length |
|---|---|---|---|
| 9. | "Saturday Night Special" | Ed King, Ronnie Van Zant | 1:55 |
| 10. | "Iron Man" | Butler, Iommi, Osbourne, Ward | 1:30 |
| 11. | "Misty Mountain Hop" | Jimmy Page, Robert Plant, John Paul Jones | 1:25 |
| 12. | "Heartbreaker" | Page, Plant, Jones, John Bonham | 2:31 |
| 13. | "Can't Get Enough" | Mick Ralphs | 1:27 |
| 14. | "Jailbreak" | Phil Lynott | 1:29 |
| 15. | "Breakdown" | Tom Petty | 2:02 |
| 16. | "No More the Moon Shines on Lorena" | A. P. Carter | 1:00 |
| 17. | "Merry-Go-Round" | Nikki Sixx | 3:01 |
| 18. | "Left in the Dark" | Ken Draznik | 2:45 |
| 19. | "Takin' Care of Business" | Randy Bachman | 0:47 |
| 20. | "I Will Follow" | Bono, The Edge, Adam Clayton, Larry Mullen Jr. | 1:01 |
| 21. | "Jumpin' Jack Flash" | Mick Jagger, Keith Richards | 1:45 |
| 22. | "Radio Free Europe" | Bill Berry, Peter Buck, Mike Mills, Michael Stipe | 2:10 |
| 23. | "The New World" | Exene Cervenka, John Doe | 1:17 |
| 24. | "Let It Be" | John Lennon, Paul McCartney | 3:32 |
| Total length: | | | 51:40 |

- With corrected song titles and songwriter listings.

== Reception ==
In 2015, Rolling Stone included it on their list of the 50 Greatest Live Albums of all time.
