= Times Like This =

Studio album by Slim Dunlap
- Released: 1996
- Genre: Rock and roll
- Label: Medium Cool/Restless

Slim Dunlap chronology
The Old New Me (1993)	Times Like This (1996)	Thank You Dancers! (2020)

Times Like This is the second album by the American musician Slim Dunlap, released in 1996. Dunlap supported the album with a North American tour. The title track was recorded by Steve Earle for the 2013 benefit album Songs for Slim. Bruce Springsteen admired the album; he played "Times Like This" on his radio show and recorded a cover of "Girlfiend".

== Production ==
The album was recorded over two years in four different studios. Paul Westerberg played piano on "Nowheres Near", about a band carrying on despite a lack of recognition. He also encouraged Dunlap to rerecord many of his vocal parts, telling him that they "didn't have any guts". The title track was written after Dunlap's tour van caught fire, destroying much of his equipment. "Hate This Town", about taking over the family business, was inspired by an unexpected reunion with a childhood friend. "Radio Hook Word Hit", a satire of the music industry, is purposely without a hook.

== Critical reception ==
Professional ratings
Review scores
Source	Rating
AllMusic	3/5 stars
Alternative Rock	6/10
Detroit Free Press	4/4 stars
Fort Worth Star-Telegram	3/5 stars
Lincoln Journal Star	5/5 stars
Orlando Sentinel	4/5 stars
San Francisco Examiner	3/5 stars

The Orlando Sentinel noted that Dunlap "can tell a story with wit and conciseness." The Los Angeles Times said that Dunlap's albums "crank out a loose and juicy Stones-'Mats-rockabilly mix while taking a basement-level underdog's view of the rock 'n' roll life, skewering those with star-trip pretensions." The Santa Fe New Mexican opined that the album is "just this side of sloppy... [But] it sounds like he actually had a great time recording it."

The Lincoln Journal Star said that the album "has the same easy-going, let's-rock attitude of Dunlap's live performances and his Keith Richards-meets-John Prine voice endearingly scratches its way into the aural nerve center." Stereo Review concluded that "the instantly addictive 'Girlfiend' is hands down the most perfect two-minute single that's never going to get on the radio." No Depression labeled Times Like This a "ragged, rickety mesh of Keith Richards-style rock, strummy country and bar-band slop."

In 2010, the Star Tribune opined that the "classic Times Like This might be the best overall post-'Mats album".

== Track listing ==
No.	Title	Length
1.	"Not Yet/Ain't No Fair (In a Rock 'n' Roll Love Affair)"
2.	"Girlfiend"
3.	"Hate This Town"
4.	"Little Shiva's Song"
5.	"Jungle Out There"
6.	"Cozy"
7.	"Cooler Then"
8.	"Chrome Lipstick"
9.	"Nowheres Near"
10.	"Radio Hook Word Hit"
11.	"Times Like This"
