= List of Billboard Modern Rock Tracks number ones of the 1980s =

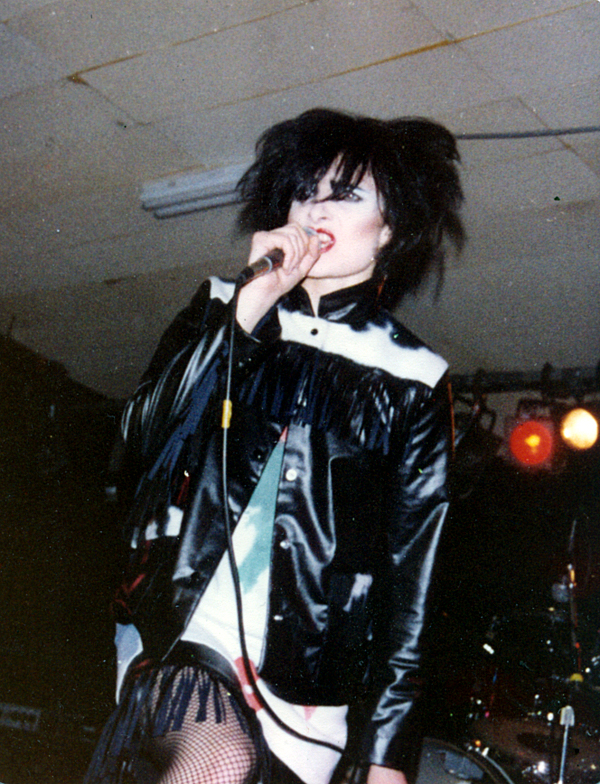
"Peek-a-Boo" by English rock band Siouxsie and the Banshees was the first song to top the Modern Rock Tracks chart.

Alternative Airplay is a record chart that ranks the most-played songs on American modern rock radio stations. Published by the music industry magazine Billboard, it was created in the midst of the growing popularity of alternative music on rock radio in the late 1980s. As less-established alternative acts were receiving minimal exposure on album-oriented rock (AOR) radio stations, their labels turned to modern rock stations for airplay. Billboard introduced the chart in response to demand within the music industry for consistent information on the commercial performance of alternative music. During the decade, it was known as the Modern Rock Tracks chart and tabulated based on weighted reports from twenty-nine radio stations: eighteen established standard-bearer commercial stations and eleven non-commercial college stations.

The Modern Rock Tracks chart debuted in the September 10, 1988, issue of Billboard, with the inaugural number-one song being "Peek-a-Boo" by the English band Siouxsie and the Banshees. Upon its debut, several publications noted the presence of more independent artists on Modern Rock Tracks compared to its companion chart, Album Rock Tracks. By the end of the decade, twenty-two songs had topped the chart. The American bands R.E.M. and The B-52's each scored two number-one songs on the Modern Rock Tracks chart during the 1980s, the most for any artist within the decade. The R.E.M. song "Orange Crush" spent the longest period atop the chart during the decade, staying at number one for eight consecutive weeks from November 1988 to January 1989. The final number one of the 1980s was "Blues from a Gun" by the Scottish band The Jesus and Mary Chain.

== Number-one songs ==
Key
† – Billboard year-end number-one song
↑ – Return of a song to number one

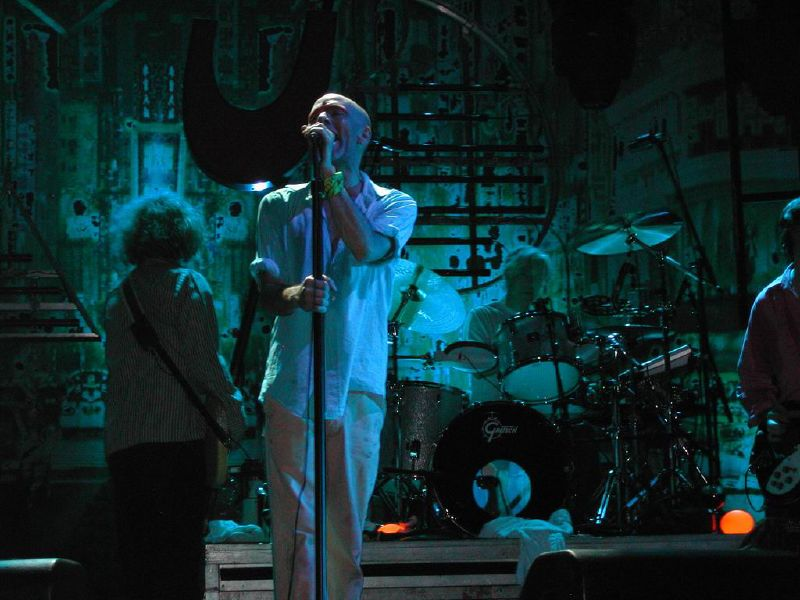
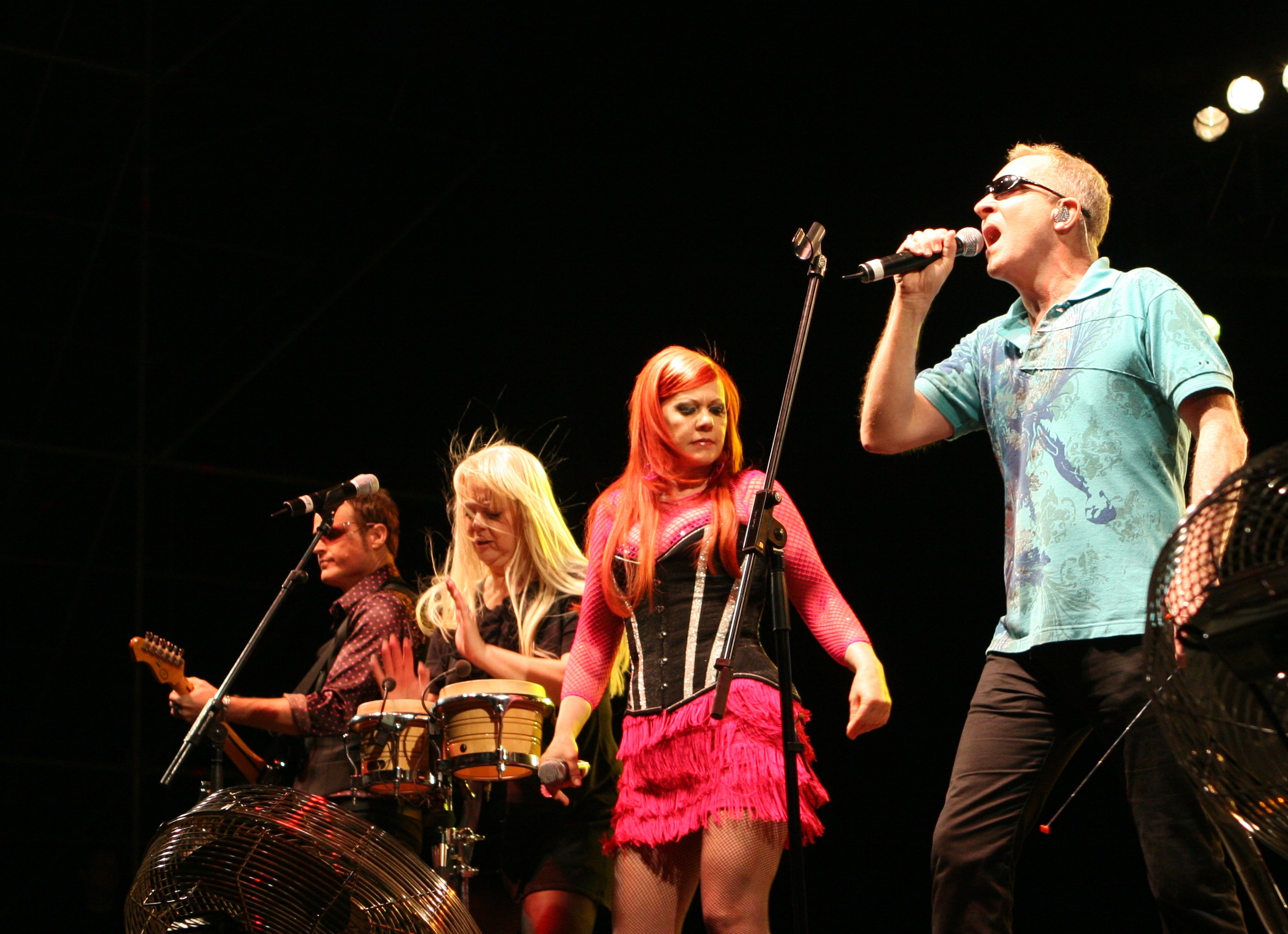
R.E.M. (top) and The B-52's (bottom) each attained two number-one hits during the decade.

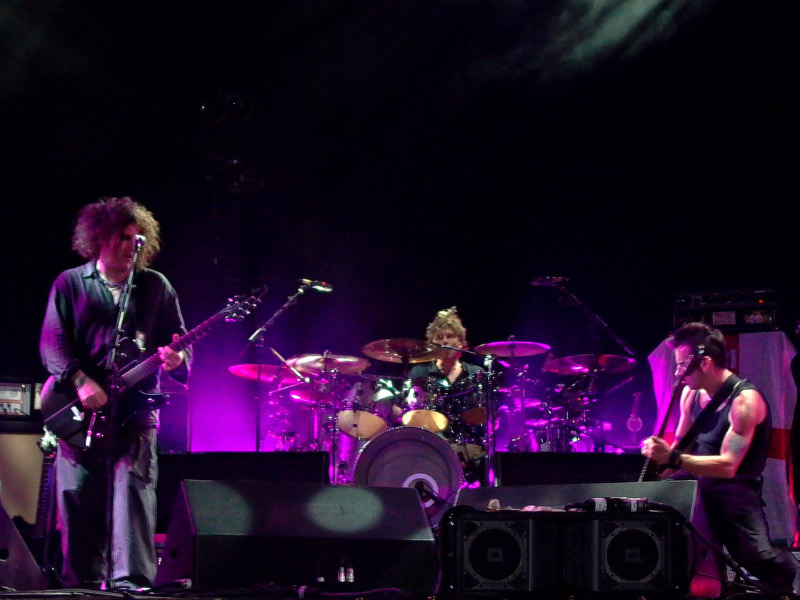
The Cure spent seven weeks atop the chart in 1989 with "Fascination Street".

Song	Artist	Reached number one	Weeks at number one
"Peek-a-Boo" †	Siouxsie and the Banshees	September 10, 1988	1
"Just Play Music!"	Big Audio Dynamite	September 17, 1988	1
"Peek-a-Boo" ↑ †	Siouxsie and the Banshees	September 24, 1988	1
"All That Money Wants"	The Psychedelic Furs	October 1, 1988	3
"Desire"	U2	October 22, 1988	5
"Orange Crush"	R.E.M.	November 26, 1988	8
"Charlotte Anne"	Julian Cope	January 21, 1989	1
"Stand"	R.E.M.	January 28, 1989	2
"Dirty Blvd."	Lou Reed	February 11, 1989	4
"I'll Be You"	The Replacements	March 11, 1989	1
"Veronica"	Elvis Costello	March 18, 1989	2
"Mayor of Simpleton"	XTC	April 1, 1989	5
"Fascination Street"	The Cure	May 6, 1989	7
"So Alive" †	Love and Rockets	June 24, 1989	5
"Disappointed"	Public Image Ltd	July 29, 1989	1
"Channel Z"	The B-52's	August 5, 1989	3
"Come Anytime"	Hoodoo Gurus	August 26, 1989	3
"Love Shack"	The B-52's	September 16, 1989	4
"Sowing the Seeds of Love"	Tears for Fears	October 14, 1989	1
"Pictures of Matchstick Men"	Camper Van Beethoven	October 21, 1989	3
"Proud to Fall"	Ian McCulloch	November 11, 1989	4
"Love and Anger"	Kate Bush	December 9, 1989	3
"Blues from a Gun"	The Jesus and Mary Chain	December 30, 1989	3

== Bibliography ==
- Cateforis, Theo (2011). Are We Not New Wave?: Modern Pop at the Turn of the 1980s. University of Michigan Press. ISBN 978-0-4720-3470-3.
- Whitburn, Joel (1996). Rock Tracks (1st ed.). Record Research. ISBN 978-0-8982-0114-7.
