= Candleland =

Studio album by Ian McCulloch
- Released: 26 September 1989
- Recorded: Early 1989
- Studios: The Church, Orinoco and Tower Bridge, London; The Grande Armée, Paris
- Genre: Alternative rock
- Length: 41:45
- Labels: Warner Bros.; Sire
- Producer: Ray Shulman

Ian McCulloch chronology
Candleland (1989)	Mysterio (1992)

Singles from Candleland
- 1. "Proud to Fall" Released: 21 August 1989; 2. "Faith and Healing" Released: 6 November 1989; 3. "Candleland (The Second Coming)" Released: 30 April 1990

Candleland is the debut solo album by the English musician Ian McCulloch. It was released on 26 September 1989. The album marked McCulloch's departure from Echo & the Bunnymen, in 1989. It features a guest appearance by the Cocteau Twins' Elizabeth Fraser on the title song. The producer, and McCulloch's main musical collaborator on the album, was the producer, programmer, multi-instrumentalist, composer and vocalist Ray Shulman, bassist and main co-writer for 1970s progressive rock group Gentle Giant. The album reached number 18 on the UK Albums Chart and number 179 on the Billboard 200.

== Critical reception ==
Professional ratings
Review scores
Source	Rating
AllMusic	4.5/5 stars
Chicago Tribune	3/4 stars

The Chicago Tribune noted that "the new material is even more brooding and self-reflective than usual".

== Track listing ==
All tracks written by Ian McCulloch.

1. "The Flickering Wall" – 3:35
2. "The White Hotel" – 3:15
3. "Proud to Fall" – 3:57
4. "The Cape" – 4:09
5. "Candleland" – 3:18
6. "Horse's Head" – 4:47
7. "Faith and Healing" – 4:36
8. "I Know You Well" – 4:06
9. "In Bloom" – 5:02
10. "Start Again" – 5:00

== Personnel ==
- Ian McCulloch – vocals, guitar
- Ray Shulman – bass, keyboards, producer, programming
- Boris Williams – drums on "The White Hotel" and "Proud to Fall"
- Mike Jobson – bass on "The Flickering Wall" and "The White Hotel"
- Elizabeth Fraser – backing vocals on "Candleland"
- Dave Bascombe – remix on "Candleland"
- Billy McGee – string arrangement on "Horse's Head"
- Olle Romo – programming on "Horse's Head" and "Start Again"
- Henry Priestman – string arrangement on "I Know You Well"
