= Robert Rankin Dunlap =

American lawyer and politician (1915–1992)

Robert Rankin Dunlap (July 25, 1915 – February 15, 1992) was an American lawyer and politician.

Dunlap was born in Saint Paul, Minnesota on July 25, 1915. He graduated from Saint Paul Central High School. His father, Roy Dunlap Sr., was the managing editor of the St. Paul Pioneer Press and Dispatch newspaper for 35 years; his brother, Roy Jr., also became the newspaper's managing editor.

Dunlap received his law degree from the University of Minnesota Law School in 1941. Dunlap served in the United States Army during World War II, reaching the rank of captain. After the war, he lived in the small town of Plainview in Wabasha County, Minnesota with his wife, Jane, where he practiced law. He also served as the Wabasha County Attorney from 1950 to 1952.

Dunlap was elected to five terms as a Republican in the Minnesota Senate from 1953 to 1967.

In 1964, Dunlap moved to Rochester, Minnesota with his wife and family and continued to practice law. In 1973, he formed a law firm, Dunlap, Keith, Finseth, Berndt and Sandberg, with future Minnesota Supreme Court chief justice Sandy Keith.

Dunlap died from a heart attack in Rochester, Minnesota at age 76.

Dunlap and his wife had five children. Dunlap's son Bob "Slim" Dunlap was a guitarist best known for being a member of alternative-rock group The Replacements.
