= Don't Tell a Soul =

1989 album by the Replacements

Studio album by the Replacements
- Released: February 1, 1989
- Recorded: 1988–1989
- Studio: Cherokee (Hollywood)
- Genre: Alternative rock
- Length: 38:37
- Label: Sire
- Producer: Matt Wallace, the Replacements

The Replacements chronology
Pleased to Meet Me (1987)	Don't Tell a Soul (1989)	All Shook Down (1990)

Singles from Don't Tell a Soul
- 1. "I'll Be You" Released: 1989; 2. "Back to Back" Released: 1989; 3. "Achin' to Be" Released: 1989

Don't Tell a Soul is the sixth studio album by the American rock band the Replacements, released on February 1, 1989, by Sire Records.

== Recording and release ==
Don't Tell a Soul was the first Replacements album featuring Bob "Slim" Dunlap, who replaced founding guitarist Bob Stinson in early 1987. The album was recorded at Cherokee Studios in Los Angeles and produced by Matt Wallace and the band. It was mixed by Chris Lord-Alge, who decided to give the record "a three-dimensional, radio-ready sound". However, singer and guitarist Paul Westerberg was not satisfied with the new direction, commenting: "I thought the little things I'd cut in my basement were closer to what I wanted."

Don't Tell a Soul was released on February 1, 1989, by Sire Records. The song "I'll Be You" was released as a single. This proved to be the band's only appearance on the Billboard Hot 100: the song peaked at #51 on the May 13, 1989 chart.

In 2008, the album was remastered and reissued by Rhino Entertainment with 7 additional tracks and liner notes by Peter Jesperson. In September 2019, Rhino released Dead Man's Pop, a box set featuring a remixed and resequenced version of Don't Tell a Soul (said to be closer to the band's original intentions) assembled by the album's producer, Matt Wallace, along with rarities, demos, and other unreleased tracks. It includes a two CD release of the 1989 live concert released on vinyl as The Complete Inconcerated Live.

== Critical reception ==
Professional ratings
Review scores
Source	Rating
AllMusic	2.5/5 stars
Chicago Sun-Times	3/4 stars
Christgau's Record Guide	B+
Entertainment Weekly	A−
Los Angeles Times	3.5/4 stars
NME	9/10
Pitchfork	8.0/10
Rolling Stone	4/5 stars
The Rolling Stone Album Guide	2/5 stars
Spin Alternative Record Guide	4/10

Don't Tell a Soul received generally favorable reviews, with critics noting the music's more mature themes and increasing disillusionment, along with a more private outlook. Ira Robbins of Rolling Stone praised Westerberg's writing, stating that Don't Tell a Soul "is full of his sharp-tongued wordplay and idiosyncratic musical structures." In February 1990, the album was ranked at number 16 in The Village Voice's 1989 Pazz & Jop critics' poll.

The Smashing Pumpkins' James Iha named the song "Achin' to Be" to his "mixtape for dreamers," commenting, "This is great, because he's talking about a would-be artist who's trying to do bigger stuff. And it sounds like someone everyone knows. Like he or she is an artist, but nobody really takes them seriously. So he's talking about her. She danced alone in nightclubs. She's a poet, she's an artist, she's like a movie, but at the end of the song, he's like, 'I'm like that, too. I've been aching for a while and I'm aching to be.' The narrator reveals himself, like, 'I'm just like her and I don't have the courage to go up to her.' Maybe I read too much into it. [Laughs.] But that's how it reads to me."

== Track listing ==
All tracks are written by Paul Westerberg, except where noted.

No.	Title	Writer(s)	Length
1.	"Talent Show"		3:32
2.	"Back to Back"		3:22
3.	"We'll Inherit the Earth"		4:22
4.	"Achin' to Be"		3:42
5.	"They're Blind"		4:37
6.	"Anywhere's Better Than Here"		2:49
7.	"Asking Me Lies"		3:40
8.	"I'll Be You"		3:27
9.	"I Won't"		2:43
10.	"Rock 'N' Roll Ghost"		3:23
11.	"Darlin' One"	Paul Westerberg, Slim Dunlap, Chris Mars, Tommy Stinson	3:39

2008 CD reissue bonus tracks
No.	Title	Writer(s)	Length
12.	"Portland"		4:28
13.	"Wake Up"		2:13
14.	"Talent Show" (Demo Version)		2:54
15.	"We'll Inherit the Earth" (Mix 1)		4:02
16.	"Date to Church" (with Tom Waits)		3:49
17.	"We Know the Night" (Outtake)		3:28
18.	"Gudbuy t'Jane" (Outtake)	Noddy Holder, Jim Lea	4:09

== Personnel ==
The Replacements

- Paul Westerberg – vocals, guitar, harmonica
- Tommy Stinson – bass, backing vocals
- Chris Mars – drums, percussion
- Slim Dunlap – guitar, mellotron, keyboards, backing vocals

Technical

- Matt Wallace – producer, engineer, cheerleader
- Chris Lord-Alge – mix engineer
