= Robert Dunlap (playwright) =

American artist and playwright (1766–1839)

Robert Dunlap (1766–1839) was an American artist, historian and playwright.

He was born in Perth Amboy, New Jersey on 1 February 1766. In his lifetime he wrote more than 60 plays.

The majority of his plays were adaptations or translations from French or German works, although some were original; several were based on American themes and had American characters. He was the first of a long line of dramatists of the American theater.

Among his earliest works were:

- The Father (1789)
- Andre (1798)
- The Stranger (1798)
- False Shame (1799)
- The Virgin of the Sun (1800)

He continued produce plays until 1828.
