= Proud to Fall =

Single by Ian McCulloch

from the album Candleland
- B-side: "Pots of Gold"
- Released: 21 August 1989
- Recorded: 1989
- Genre: Alternative rock
- Length: 3:57
- Label: Warner Bros.; Sire
- Songwriter(s): Ian McCulloch
- Producer(s): Ray Shulman; Ian McCulloch; Henry Priestman

Ian McCulloch singles chronology
"September Song" (1985)	"Proud to Fall" (1989)	"Faith and Healing" (1990)

"Proud to Fall" is the first single released by Ian McCulloch from his debut solo album Candleland, in 1989. The song reached number one on the Billboard Modern Rock Tracks chart in the US and number fifty-one on the UK Singles Chart. In September 2023, for the 35th anniversary of Modern Rock Tracks (by which time it had been renamed to Alternative Airplay), Billboard ranked the song at number 73 on its list of the 100 most successful songs in the chart's history.

== Track listing ==
All tracks written by Ian McCulloch except "The Circle Game" by Joni Mitchell.

7-inch single (YZ417)

1. "Proud to Fall" – 3:57
2. "Pots of Gold" – 4:20

12-inch single (YZ417T)

1. "Proud to Fall" (Long Night's Journey Mix) – 7:10
2. "Pots of Gold" – 4:20
3. "The Dead End" – 4:45

12-inch single (YZ417TX)

1. "Proud to Fall" (album version) – 3:57
2. "Everything Is Real"
3. "The Circle Game"

== Personnel ==
- Ian McCulloch – vocals, guitar, producer ("Everything Is Real", "The Circle Game")
- Ray Shulman – bass, keyboards, producer ("Proud to Fall", "Pots of Gold", "The Dead End")
- Boris Williams – drums
- Gil Norton – remix ("Proud To Fall (Long Night's Journey Mix)")
- Henry Priestman – producer ("The Circle Game")

== Charts ==
Chart (1989–90)	Peak position
UK Singles (OCC)	51
US Alternative Airplay (Billboard)	1

== See also ==
- List of Billboard number-one alternative singles of the 1980s
