= Mysterio (album) =

Studio album by Ian McCulloch
- Released: 17 March 1992
- Genre: Alternative rock
- Length: 44:11
- Label: East West, Sire
- Producer: Mark Saunders, Henry Priestman, Robin Guthrie

Ian McCulloch chronology
Candleland (1989)	Mysterio (1992)	Slideling (2003)

Singles from Mysterio
- 1. "Honeydrip" Released: 5 March 1992; 2. "Lover, Lover, Lover" Released: 28 May 1992; 3. "Dug for Love" Released: 1992

Professional ratings
Review scores
Source	Rating
Allmusic	3/5 stars

Mysterio is an album by Ian McCulloch, released 17 March 1992. This was McCulloch's second solo album since his departure from Echo & the Bunnymen in 1989. The album features a cover of the Leonard Cohen song "Lover, Lover, Lover," as well as a guest appearance on the song "Heaven's Gate" by Elizabeth Fraser of the Cocteau Twins. The album reached number 46 on the UK Albums Chart and number 39 on Billboard's Top Heatseekers chart.

== Track listing ==
All tracks written by Ian McCulloch except where noted.

1. "Magical World" – 4:10
2. "Close Your Eyes" – 4:39
3. "Dug for Love" – 3:50
4. "Honeydrip" – 4:37
5. "Damnation" – 3:18
6. "Lover, Lover, Lover" (Leonard Cohen) – 3:55
7. "Webbed" – 2:57
8. "Pomegranate" – 4:22
9. "Vibor Blue" – 2:59
10. "Heaven's Gate" – 3:59
11. "In My Head" – 5:05

== Personnel ==
- Ian McCulloch – vocals, guitar

THE PRODIGAL SONS

- Steven Humphreys – drums
- John McEvoy – guitar
- Edgar Jones – bass
- Mike Mooney – lead guitar
- Joe Gibb - percussion, trumpet

with:

- Jono Podmore - electric violin on "Honey Drip" and "In My Head"
- Roddy Frame - guitar on "Heaven's Gate"
- Elizabeth Fraser - backing vocals on "Heaven's Gate"
- Lol Le Pop - backing vocals on "Close Your Eyes"
- Sue Quin - backing vocals on "Dug for Love" and "Lover Lover Lover"

Technical

- Mark Saunders – producer ("Magical World", "Close Your Eyes", "Honeydrip", "Damnation", "Webbed", "Pomegranate" and "In My Head")
- Henry Priestman – producer ("Dug for Love" and "Lover, Lover, Lover")
- Robin Guthrie – producer ("Vibor Blue" and "Heaven's Gate")
- Joe Gibb - engineer
- Andrew Catlin - cover photography
