= Pro Patria Mori (album) =

Studio album by Ian McCulloch
- Released: 17 May 2012
- Genre: Alternative rock
- Producer: Ian McCulloch

Ian McCulloch chronology
Slideling (2003)	Pro Patria Mori (2012)

Pro Patria Mori is the fourth solo album by English singer-songwriter Ian McCulloch. The fan-funded album was released on 17 May 2012 on McCulloch's own MACC Records. The songs were also included as the second disc of McCulloch's 2013 double live album, Holy Ghosts.

== Critical reception ==
Classic Rock's David Quantick comments that the album is "produced with a light MOR-ish edge reminiscent of mid-60s Jimmy Webb or Scott Walker, it features some of McCulloch’s most personal songs, the title track being a reflection on war and death, and the excellent "Me and David Bowie" an actually moving tribute to Mac’s hero."

Martyn Coppack on Echoes and Dust stated that it was "much lighter in tone than later Bunnymen albums" and that "this is the sound of McCulloch cutting loose and having fun". He commented that it was "almost skeletal in delivery, the music relies heavily on synthesisers with McCulloch enjoying wordplay over this."

Paul Scott-Bates from Louder Than War rated the album a 9/10. He went on to state "it’s an album of quite outstanding quality. Incredibly catchy songs. Emotional, brooding and stark, they will make you feel good and occasionally make you ponder." He believes that "several of the songs here could have nestled quite easily on Echo & The Bunnymen’s undoubted finest moment, 1984’s Ocean Rain, surely one of the greatest albums ever made."

The Music's Ross Clelland comments that "while some of the constructions are genuinely crafted and textured, too often the words just sort of clunk."

Alex Lee Alexander writing for Drowned in Sound remarks that the album is a "delicate affair overall, but still loaded with swelling, sweet landscapes of string and menacing studio production." He goes on to state "This isn't the best record McCulloch's put out and yet still career-defining, not only paying respect to Echo & The Bunnymen with 30 years of nostalgic contemplation into the re-workings, and new tracks that tip a cap to his influences - Bowie, Reed, etc - but also shows an intelligent, relevant British songsmith still worth listening to."

Bruce Dressau is more critical stating "Pro Patria Mori, hints at why McCulloch is not in the premier league these days. The music is accessible, mature and sophisticated while true to his Eighties roots. His voice, once again, is a fantastic instrument, wrapping itself around each and every word. But, cripes, the lyrics are more cringeworthy than a Justin Bieber guest book comment, more Freddie & the Dreamers than John Lennon."

== Track listing ==
All tracks written by Ian McCulloch.

1. “Different Trees” – 3:46
2. “Empty as A House” – 3:54
3. “Lift Me Up” – 4:14
4. “Pro Patria Mori” – 4:43
5. “Raindrop on The Sun” – 3:07
6. “Fiery Flame” – 3:23
7. “The Party’s Over” – 5:11
8. “Watch Me Land” – 3:42
9. “Me and David Bowie” – 5:25
10. “Somewhere in My Dreams” – 3:41
