= Slideling =

Studio album by Ian McCulloch
- Released: 28 April 2003
- Genre: Alternative rock
- Length: 42:10
- Label: Cooking Vinyl
- Producers: Cenzo Townshend, Ian McCulloch

Ian McCulloch chronology
Mysterio (1992)	Slideling (2003)	Pro Patria Mori (2012)

Singles from Slideling
- 1. "Sliding" Released: 14 April 2003; 2. "Love in Veins" Released: 21 July 2003

Professional ratings
Review scores
Source	Rating
AllMusic	4/5 stars

Slideling is the third solo album by British singer-songwriter Ian McCulloch and was released in 2003. The album features guest appearances by Coldplay singer Chris Martin, who provides backing vocals and piano on "Sliding" as well as piano on "Arthur"; Coldplay lead guitarist Jonny Buckland, who plays guitar on "Sliding" and "Arthur"; and actor John Simm, who plays guitar on "Sliding".

== Track listing ==
1. "Love in Veins" – 3:25
2. "Playgrounds and City Parks" – 3:17
3. "Sliding" – 3:37
4. "Baby Hold On" – 3:52
5. "Arthur" – 3:39
6. "Seasons" – 4:10
7. "Another Train" – 3:58
8. "High Wires" – 4:14
9. "She Sings (All My Life)" – 3:12
10. "Kansas" – 4:41
11. "Stake Your Claim" – 4:05

== Personnel ==
- Ian McCulloch – vocals, rhythm guitar, record producer
- Peter Byrne – lead guitar
- Peter Wilkinson – bass, backing vocals
- Ceri James – piano, keyboards
- Simon Finley – drums
- Ian Bracken – cello
- Barriemore Barlow – percussion
- Malcolm Johnston – viola
- Kate Evans – violin
- Martin Richardson – violin
- Chris Martin – backing vocals ("Sliding" and "Arthur"), piano ("Arthur")
- John Simm – electric guitar ("Sliding")
- Jonny Buckland – electric guitar ("Sliding" and "Arthur")
- Cenzo Townshend – producer, engineer, mixing
- Kevin Metcalfe – mastering
- Tom Stanley – Pro Tools
