= Pleased to Meet Me =

1987 album by The Replacements

Studio album by the Replacements
- Released: March 3, 1987
- Recorded: 1986–1987
- Studios: Ardent, Studio B, Memphis
- Genres: Power pop; post-punk
- Length: 33:00
- Label: Sire
- Producer: Jim Dickinson

The Replacements chronology
Tim (1985)	Pleased to Meet Me (1987)	Don't Tell a Soul (1989)

Singles from Pleased to Meet Me
- 1. "The Ledge" Released: 1987; 2. "Alex Chilton" Released: 1987; 3. "Can't Hardly Wait" Released: July 1987; 4. "Skyway" Released: 1988

Pleased to Meet Me is the fifth studio album by the American rock band the Replacements, released on March 3, 1987 by Sire Records. The album reached No. 131 on the Billboard 200 and later appeared at No. 3 in The Village Voice Jazz & Pop critics' poll for 1987. Critics have described the record as a ragged strain of power pop that broadened the band's early punk approach.

== Background and recording ==
Pleased to Meet Me is the only album recorded by the band as a trio. After their previous album Tim, guitarist Bob Stinson was no longer with the band. Stinson was still a member when the album's demos were recorded in August 1986. He only showed up for one recording session.

The main recording sessions for the album took place at Ardent Studios in Memphis between November 1986 and January 1987, under the supervision of producer Jim Dickinson. Producer Jim Dickinson attempted to involve Bob Stinson in the sessions and even floated the working title Where's Bob? as a nod to Stinson’s absence.

Guitarist Bob "Slim" Dunlap joined the band soon after the recording sessions.

== Music and lyrics ==
While the punk roots of the group were still apparent on Tim, by Pleased to Meet Me they were there more in spirit as the band delved into other genres, such as soul and cocktail jazz, alongside tracks featuring their customary hard rocking sound. Reviewers noted a shift toward hook-forward power pop and the addition of horns and cocktail-jazz flourishes, while retaining the group’s rough edges. David Fricke called it “alive with the crackle of conflicting emotions and kamikaze rock & roll fire,” and later writers have framed the record as wounded, ragged power pop.

== Artwork and release ==
The album's cover art mocks the band's transition from young punks to successful musicians with a major record deal, depicting a handshake between one person clad in a suit, starched white shirt, glitzy watch and diamond ring and the other wearing a ripped workshirt. Westerberg was the man in the ripped shirt, but his face was not shown in the shot used on the cover. Westerberg said, "That was Tommy's line. Whether he took it from Johnny Rotten, I don’t know. 'Pleased to meet me, the pleasure is all yours.' We had to hire a hand model for the major-label rich guy because nobody in the band owned a watch." The self-mocking tone continues on the song, "I Don't Know", with its chorus, "One foot in the door/The other one in the gutter."

Pleased to Meet Me was released in 1987 by Sire Records and peaked at No. 131 on the Billboard Music Chart's Top 200. According to Our Band Could Be Your Life author Michael Azerrad, the album sold "about 300,000 copies".

On September 23, 2008, Pleased to Meet Me was remastered and reissued by Rhino Entertainment with 11 additional tracks consisting of studio demos, B-sides, and alternate takes. New liner notes were written by Peter Jesperson.

In 2020, Rhino Entertainment released a deluxe edition that contained 3 CDs and 1 LP.

=== Censorship and "The Ledge" video ===
A video for "The Ledge" was rejected by MTV, whose standards department objected to the song’s narrative involving a suicide attempt. Contemporary coverage described the decision within a broader late-1980s debate on music-video content and teen suicide.

=== Commercial performance ===
The album peaked at No. 131 on the Billboard 200 and ultimately sold in the neighborhood of 300,000 copies, according to journalist Michael Azerrad.

== Critical reception ==
Professional ratings
Review scores
Source	Rating
AllMusic	4/5 stars
The Austin Chronicle	4/5 stars
Chicago Sun-Times	4/4 stars
Entertainment Weekly	A
Los Angeles Times	4/4 stars
Pitchfork	9.3/10
Q	3/5 stars
The Rolling Stone Album Guide	3.5/5 stars
Spin Alternative Record Guide	7/10
The Village Voice	A−

Pleased to Meet Me was acclaimed by music critics. Writing for Rolling Stone, David Fricke described it as "an album alive with the crackle of conflicting emotions and kamikaze rock & roll fire." In a retrospective review, Stephen Thomas Erlewine of AllMusic felt that Pleased to Meet Me "was the last time [The Replacements] could still shoot for the stars and seem like their scrappy selves and, in many ways, it was the last true Replacements album". The album appeared at number three in The Village Voice's Pazz & Jop critics' poll for 1987. In 2012, Paste placed the record at number 70 on its list of "The 80 Best Albums of the 1980s".

== Track listing ==
All tracks are written by Paul Westerberg, except where noted.

No.	Title	Writer(s)	Length
1.	"I.O.U."		2:57
2.	"Alex Chilton"	Westerberg; Tommy Stinson; Chris Mars	3:11
3.	"I Don't Know"	Westerberg; Stinson; Mars	3:20
4.	"Nightclub Jitters"		2:44
5.	"The Ledge"		4:04
6.	"Never Mind"		2:47
7.	"Valentine"	Westerberg; Stinson; Mars	3:31
8.	"Shooting Dirty Pool"	Westerberg; Stinson; Mars	2:20
9.	"Red Red Wine"		3:00
10.	"Skyway"		2:04
11.	"Can't Hardly Wait"		3:02

2008 CD reissue bonus tracks
No.	Title	Writer(s)	Length
12.	"Birthday Gal" (Demo)		4:39
13.	"Valentine" (Demo Version)	Westerberg; Stinson; Mars	4:09
14.	"Bundle Up" (Demo)	Westerberg; Stinson; Mars	2:59
15.	"Photo" (Demo)		3:46
16.	"Election Day"		2:56
17.	"Alex Chilton" (Alternate Version)	Westerberg; Stinson; Mars	3:37
18.	"Kick It In" (Demo)		3:33
19.	"Route 66"	Bobby Troup	2:57
20.	"Tossin' n' Turnin'"	Ritchie Adams; Malou Rene	2:20
21.	"Can't Hardly Wait" (Alternate Version)		3:00
22.	"Cool Water"	Bob Nolan	3:04
Total length:			70:00

=== 2020 Deluxe Edition ===
All tracks are written by Paul Westerberg, except where noted.

Disc One: Pleased to Meet Me (2020 Remaster) + Rare, Single-Only Tracks
No.	Title	Writer(s)	Length
1.	"I.O.U."		2:58
2.	"Alex Chilton"	Westerberg; Tommy Stinson; Chris Mars	3:13
3.	"I Don't Know"	Westerberg; Stinson; Mars	3:21
4.	"Nightclub Jitters"		2:45
5.	"The Ledge"		4:07
6.	"Never Mind"		2:50
7.	"Valentine"	Westerberg; Stinson; Mars	3:35
8.	"Shooting Dirty Pool"	Westerberg; Stinson; Mars	2:22
9.	"Red Red Wine"		3:01
10.	"Skyway"		2:04
11.	"Can't Hardly Wait"		3:06
12.	"Election Day"		2:55
13.	"Jungle Rock"	Ralph Simonton, Hank Mizell, James Bobo, Bill Collins	2:37
14.	"Route 66"	Bobby Troupe	2:55
15.	"Tossin' N' Turnin'"	Malou Rene, Ritchie Adams	2:19
16.	"Cool Water"	Bob Nolan	2:41
17.	"Can't Hardly Wait (Jimmy Iovine Remix)"		3:04

All tracks are written by Paul Westerberg, except where noted.

Disc Two: Blackberry Way Demos
No.	Title	Writer(s)	Length
18.	"Bundle Up" (Demo)		2:57
19.	"Birthday Gal" (Demo)		4:40
20.	"I.O.U." (Demo)		3:15
21.	"Red Red Wine" (Demo)		3:21
22.	"Photo" (Demo)		3:48
23.	"Time Is Killing Us" (Demo)		4:14
24.	"Valentine" (Demo)		4:08
25.	"Awake Tonight" (Demo)	Tommy Stinson	3:47
26.	"Hey Shadow" (Demo)	Tommy Stinson	3:55
27.	"I Don't Know" (Demo)	Paul Westerberg, Tommy Stinson, Chris Mars	3:25
28.	"Kick It In" (Demo 1)		3:55
29.	"Shooting Dirty Pool" (Demo)	Paul Westerberg, Tommy Stinson, Chris Mars	2:56
30.	"Kick It In" (Demo 2)		3:42
31.	"All He Wants To Do Is Fish" (Demo)	Chris Mars	2:59
32.	"Even If It's Cheap" (Demo)	Tommy Stinson	2:56

All tracks are written by Paul Westerberg, except where noted.

Disc Three: Rough Mixes, Outtakes, & Alternates
No.	Title	Writer(s)	Length
32.	"Valentine" (Rough Mix)		3:41
33.	"Never Mind" (Rough Mix)		2:50
34.	"Birthday Gal" (Rough Mix)		4:26
35.	"Alex Chilton" (Rough Mix)	Paul Westerberg, Tommy Stinson, Chris Mars	3:15
36.	"Election Day" (Rough Mix)		2:46
37.	"Kick It In" (Rough Mix)		3:30
38.	"Red Red Wine" (Rough Mix)		3:22
39.	"The Ledge" (Rough Mix)		4:14
40.	"I.O.U." (Rough Mix)		3:00
41.	"Can't Hardly Wait" (Rough Mix)		3:07
42.	"Nightclub Jitters" (Rough Mix)		2:47
43.	"Skyway" (Rough Mix)		2:08
44.	"Cool Water" (Rough Mix)	Bob Nolan	2:40
45.	"Birthday Gal" (2020 Remaster)		3:52
46.	"Learn How To Fail"		3:39
47.	"Run For The Country"		4:30
48.	"All He Wants To Do Is Fish" (2020 Remaster)	Chris Mars	2:42
49.	"I Can Help" (Studio Outtake)	Bill Lance Swan	3:33
50.	"Lift Your Skirt"		2:15
51.	"Till We're Nude" (2020 Remaster)		2:08
52.	"Beer For Breakfast" (2020 Remaster)		1:38
53.	"Trouble On The Way"	Tommy Stinson	3:10
54.	"I Don't Know" (Out Take, 2020 Remaster)		3:05

All tracks are written by Paul Westerberg, except where noted.

LP Track Listing Side A
No.	Title	Writer(s)	Length
55.	"Valentine" (Rough Mix)		3:41
56.	"Never Mind" (Rough Mix)		2:50
57.	"Birthday Gal" (Rough Mix)		4:26
58.	"Alex Chilton" (Rough Mix)	Paul Westerberg, Tommy Stinson, Chris Mars	3:15
59.	"Election Day" (Rough Mix)		2:46
60.	"Kick It In" (Rough Mix)		3:30

All tracks are written by Paul Westerberg, except where noted.

LP Track Listing Side B
No.	Title	Writer(s)	Length
61.	"Red Red Wine" (Rough Mix)		3:22
62.	"The Ledge" (Rough Mix)		4:14
63.	"I.O.U." (Rough Mix)		3:00
64.	"Can't Hardly Wait" (Rough Mix)		3:07
65.	"Nightclub Jitters" (Rough Mix)		2:47
66.	"Skyway" (Rough Mix)		2:08
67.	"Cool Water" (Rough Mix)	Bob Nolan	2:40

== Personnel ==
- Paul Westerberg – lead and background vocals, electric and acoustic guitars, piano (on "Nightclub Jitters"), six-string bass (on "Skyway", "Can't Hardly Wait"), harmonica (on "Can't Hardly Wait")
- Tommy Stinson – bass guitar (except "Skyway"), background vocals, upright bass (on "Nightclub Jitters"), acoustic guitar and guitar fills (on "Can't Hardly Wait")
- Chris Mars – drums, background vocals, cowbell (on "Alex Chilton"), foot tap (on "Skyway")
- Jim Dickinson (credited as East Memphis Slim) – keyboards (on "I.O.U.", "The Ledge", "Can't Hardly Wait"), background vocals (on "I.O.U."), organ (on "Valentine"), vibes (on "Skyway")
- James "Vito" Lancaster – background vocals (on "I.O.U.", "Alex Chilton", "Shooting Dirty Pool")
- Teenage Steve Douglas – baritone sax (on "I Don't Know"), bass flute (on "The Ledge")
- Prince Gabe – saxophone (on "Nightclub Jitters")
- Luther Dickinson – guitar solo (on "Shooting Dirty Pool")
- Alex Chilton – guitar fills (on "Can't Hardly Wait")
- Max Huls – strings (on "Can't Hardly Wait")
- The Memphis Horns (on "Can't Hardly Wait"):
  - Andrew Love – tenor sax
  - Ben Cauley (credited as Ben Jr.) – trumpet
- John Hampton – engineer, mixing
- Joe Hardy – engineer, mixing
- Ted Jensen – mastering
- James Lancaster – production Assistant, inner sleeve photography
- Daniel Corrigan – cover and inner sleeve photography
- Glenn Parsons – design
