= All Shook Down =

1990 album by the Replacements

Studio album by the Replacements
- Released: September 25, 1990
- Recorded: 1990
- Genre: Alternative rock
- Length: 41:00 (original); 1:15:32 (reissue)
- Label: Sire
- Producer: Scott Litt

The Replacements chronology
Don't Tell a Soul (1989)	All Shook Down (1990)	All for Nothing / Nothing for All (1997)

Singles from All Shook Down
- 1. "Merry Go Round" Released: 1990; 2. "Someone Take the Wheel" Released: 1991; 3. "When It Began" Released: 1991

All Shook Down is the seventh and final studio album by the American rock band the Replacements, released on September 25, 1990, by Sire Records.

== Recording ==
This album was originally intended to be frontman Paul Westerberg's solo artist debut. His management talked him into doing it as a Replacements album before the recording started. As a result of its initial intent, All Shook Down is marked by numerous session, side and journeyman musicians, in addition to the three other Replacements.

Although there are no clear records of which members played on which tracks, there are numerous clues. In an interview with Musician magazine, Westerberg noted that there were four drummers on the record, but 'we didn't bring in any guitar players,' indicating that all of the guitar parts were performed by Replacements members, but many of the drum parts were not. Replacements bassist Tommy Stinson joined the project only about a week after it started, and no bassists are included among the list of session musicians, indicating that Stinson played most of the bass on the record. Stinson has mentioned 'the songs I didn't play on' which may refer to songs like the title track that do not feature bass, or that Westerberg, who occasionally played 6-string bass on the band's earlier recordings may have played some bass in Stinson's place.

Replacements drummer Chris Mars also brought in a cassette tape of his own material that he recorded on a four-track. Mars had written songs for the Replacements before, but when Westerberg became the band's primary songwriter, he began to reject every song that Mars would bring in. When Westerberg dismissed his songs out of hand, Mars decided it was time for him to leave the band altogether.

A number of the tracks also prominently feature Stinson's backing vocals. Guitarist Slim Dunlap joined the project later, and may have participated less than Stinson did, but it is notable that Westerberg kept Dunlap around to add guitar and vocal overdubs after Stinson and Mars finished their parts, and while the album has relatively few guitar leads, several songs feature Dunlap's distinctive lead style. Mars had already been replaced by session drummer Charley Drayton on a few tracks before he arrived at the sessions, and the band used two other session drummers before its completion, indicating that his role was limited compared to the other band members. The only track featuring the entire band performing together may be the acoustic rave-up "Attitude".

Of the other musicians, notable contributors include John Cale, formerly of the Velvet Underground, who plays viola on "Sadly Beautiful", and Johnette Napolitano of Concrete Blonde, who duets with Westerberg on the song "My Little Problem".

Westerberg said, "The two dogs represented me and Tommy, two stray dogs in the rain sniffing each other's asses. My singing was horseshit from boozing, I had reached the end of my marriage and didn't know where to go or what to do."

== Release ==
Professional ratings
Review scores
Source	Rating
AllMusic	4.5/5 stars
Chicago Tribune	3/4 stars
Entertainment Weekly	B− (1990); B (2008)
Los Angeles Times	3.5/5 stars
NME	4/10
Pitchfork	6.3/10
Q	3/5 stars
Rolling Stone	4/5 stars
The Rolling Stone Album Guide	2/5 stars
Select	4/5

The band issued promotional-only singles for "Merry Go Round", "Someone Take the Wheel", "When It Began", and "Happy Town". "Merry Go Round" was the band's most successful Modern Rock Tracks single, reaching No. 1 for four non-consecutive weeks.

Drummer Chris Mars left the band in November 1990 (his last appearance as a Replacement being in the "Merry Go Round" video) and Steve Foley filled in on drums for the six-month All Shook Down Tour of 1991. The band were nominated for the Best Alternative Video and Best Special Effects categories at the 1991 MTV Video Music Awards for the claymation/live action music video for "When It Began". The band played its last show on Independence Day, July 4, 1991, at Chicago's Grant Park. They also received a nomination for a Grammy Award for Best Alternative Music Album.

Rolling Stone ranked the album number three on their Albums of the Year of 1990.

The album was remastered and reissued by Rhino Entertainment on September 23, 2008, with 11 additional tracks and liner notes by Peter Jesperson.

The album cover art was taken in Newport, Kentucky, from the corner of 7th and Brighton St. looking north towards Cincinnati, Ohio.

== Track listing ==
All tracks are written by Paul Westerberg, except where noted.

No.	Title	Length
1.	"Merry Go Round"	3:29
2.	"One Wink at a Time"	3:02
3.	"Nobody"	3:06
4.	"Bent Out of Shape"	3:42
5.	"Sadly Beautiful"	3:09
6.	"Someone Take the Wheel"	3:37
7.	"When It Began"	3:07
8.	"All Shook Down"	3:16
9.	"Attitude"	2:43
10.	"Happy Town"	2:54
11.	"Torture"	1:52
12.	"My Little Problem"	4:09
13.	"The Last"	2:54

2008 CD reissue bonus tracks
No.	Title	Writer(s)	Length
14.	"When It Began" (Demo Version)		2:47
15.	"Kissin' in Action" (Demo Version)		2:27
16.	"Someone Take the Wheel" (Demo Version)		3:37
17.	"Attitude" (Demo Version)		2:54
18.	"Happy Town" (Demo Version)		2:40
19.	"Tiny Paper Plane" (Demo Version)		2:08
20.	"Sadly Beautiful" (Demo Version)		3:15
21.	"My Little Problem" (Alternate Version)		3:39
22.	"Ought to Get Love"		3:04
23.	"Satellite"	Tommy Stinson	3:39
24.	"Kissin' in Action"		3:35

- Tracks 14–20 are studio demos.
- Track 21 is an alternate take.
- Tracks 22–24 are from the promo EP Don't Sell or Buy, It's Crap.

== Personnel ==
The Replacements

- Paul Westerberg − vocals, guitar, piano
- Slim Dunlap − guitar, backing vocals
- Tommy Stinson − bass guitar, backing vocals
- Chris Mars − drums

with:

- John Cale − viola on "Sadly Beautiful"
- Abe Lincoln
- Axel Niehaus
- Benmont Tench – piano, organ
- Charley Drayton – drums on "Merry Go Round" and "Someone Take the Wheel"
- David Schramm
- Johnette Napolitano – vocals on "My Little Problem"
- Mauro Magellan – drums on "Bent Out of Shape"
- Michael Blair – drums on "Happy Town", "My Little Problem" and "The Last"
- Steve Berlin – saxophone on "One Wink at a Time", ocarina on "All Shook Down"
- Terry Reid – backing vocals on "Someone Take the Wheel"
