= Alex Chilton (song) =

1987 single by the Replacements

Single by the Replacements

from the album Pleased to Meet Me
- B-side: "Election Day"
- Released: 1987
- Recorded: 1987 at Ardent Studios, Studio B, Memphis
- Genre: Alternative pop; power pop
- Length: 3:12
- Label: Sire
- Songwriter(s): Paul Westerberg, Chris Mars, Tommy Stinson
- Producer(s): Jim Dickinson

The Replacements singles chronology
"The Ledge" (1987)	"Alex Chilton" (1987)	"Can't Hardly Wait" (1987)

Audio
- "Alex Chilton" on YouTube

"Alex Chilton" is a song by American rock band the Replacements from their fifth studio album Pleased to Meet Me. The song was written as a homage to the Box Tops and Big Star frontman Alex Chilton, who was an idol of the band's who worked with them on several occasions. The song's hook was inspired by Replacements frontman Paul Westerberg's attempt to compliment one of Chilton's songs upon meeting him for the first time.

"Alex Chilton" was released as a promotional single from the album and was accompanied by a music video that used footage from the band's banned video for "The Ledge." It has since received critical acclaim and has been named by many music writers as one of the band's greatest songs.

== Background ==
The song is a homage to Alex Chilton, lead singer of the Box Tops and Big Star. The Replacements and Chilton shared a booking agent and were mutual fans of each other; Chilton had even produced early demos for the band's 1985 album Tim, although the final album was produced by Tommy Ramone. When the band was recording their 1987 album Pleased to Meet Me at Ardent Studios in Memphis, Chilton was often present. He appeared as a guest musician on the album, playing guitar on the song "Can't Hardly Wait." Replacements frontman Paul Westerberg commented on Chilton, "His aura is different than the average person's. He could be from another planet."

"Alex Chilton" originated as a demo called "George from Outer Space," which featured lyrics about Replacements roadie George Lewis. Westerberg changed the lyrics to make them an homage to Chilton, who had seen a resurgence in popularity in the college rock scene, and Westerberg developed a "singsongy pop kind of thing [like] Big Star" for a chord sequence. The hook "I'm in love / With that song" was based on Westerberg's first encounter with Chilton, when, in an effort to make conversation, Westerberg told him, "I'm in love with that one song of yours—what's that song?", having forgotten the title to Big Star's "Watch the Sunrise." The line "Checkin' his stash by the trash at St. Mark's place" was inspired by a lunch meeting held between Westerberg, The Replacements' manager Peter Jesperson and Chilton.

The band sought to keep the song away from Chilton, fearing it would make a bad impression. Chilton eventually heard the song in its finished form while touring with the band. Chilton called the song a "pretty good song" and joked, "I feel like a great legendary outlaw, like John Wesley Hardin or something."

== Release ==
"Alex Chilton" was released as a promo single from the band's 1987 Pleased to Meet Me. The B-side was the non-album track "Election Day."

A music video for "Alex Chilton" was released in 1987. The video was created by repurposing footage from the music video for the band's song "The Ledge," also from Pleased to Meet Me. The video for "The Ledge," a song written about suicide, was rejected by MTV for "objectionable song content." Extra footage from these films were later used in 2020 to make a video for another track from the album, "Can't Hardly Wait."

An alternate "rough mix' of the song later appeared on the deluxe edition of Pleased to Meet Me. The song is available as a playable track on the music video game Rock Band 2. The song is also heard in the background of the bachelor party scene in season 1, episode 3 of Psych.

== Critical reception ==
Kory Grow of Rolling Stone called the song one of the two "all-time classics" from Pleased to Meet Me, the other being "Can't Hardly Wait." Kristine McKenna of Los Angeles Times was similarly glowing in her praise of the song, writing, "It's hard to think of a more deserving pop hero [than Chilton], and if Pleased achieved nothing more than to revive interest in the criminally underrated Chilton it would justify its existence." Stephen Thomas Erlewine of AllMusic called the song "brilliant, shining power pop."

The song has been ranked by many music writers as one of the best Replacements songs. Ultimate Classic Rock named it the band's fifth best song, while PopMatters ranked it as their seventh best, with the latter calling it "an inspired love letter from one underachiever to his antecedent." Diffuser.fm also ranked it as their seventh best, while The Guardian ranked it eighth and Laura Jane Grace of Against Me! on Louder ranked it ninth.
