= Can't Hardly Wait (song) =

1987 single by the Replacements

Single by the Replacements

from the album Pleased to Meet Me
- B-side: "Cool Water"
- Released: July 1987
- Recorded: 1987
- Studio: Ardent (Memphis)
- Genre: Alternative rock; power pop
- Length: 3:02
- Label: Sire
- Songwriter: Paul Westerberg
- Producer: Jim Dickinson

The Replacements singles chronology
"Alex Chilton" (1987)	"Can't Hardly Wait" (1987)	"I'll Be You" (1989)

Audio
- "Can't Hardly Wait" on YouTube

"Can't Hardly Wait" is a song by American rock band the Replacements from their fifth studio album Pleased to Meet Me. Written shortly after the sessions for Let It Be, the song was attempted for the 1985 Tim album but ultimately went unreleased until Pleased to Meet Me. The song features Alex Chilton on guitar as well as an arrangement with horns and strings, additions that were controversial within the band.

"Can't Hardly Wait" was released as the third single from the album. It has since received critical acclaim and has been named by many music writers as one of the band's greatest songs. A music video for the song utilizing footage from 1987 was released in 2020.

== Background ==
Replacements frontman Paul Westerberg had written "Can't Hardly Wait" in 1985 in the aftermath of the Let It Be sessions. The band attempted to record the song for the 1985 Tim album, but were dissatisfied with the recording; Westerberg commented, "We had played it so many times that we were tired of it." An early version was attempted in Nicollet Studios, where Michelle Kinney, a trained cellist working as the studio's receptionist, was recruited to play cello. She recalled, "There wasn't any music written down. I do remember watching Paul through the studio window and him talking in my headphones and kind of singing parts for me. He would kind of conduct me, and I'd try to do what he asked. He was being really hilarious and animated and calling me 'Maestro.'"

By the time the band began the sessions for 1987's Pleased to Meet Me, the attitude in the band was that the song was "dead, long gone, over with, we were never gonna record it again." However, the band were convinced to try the song again, prompting Westerberg to rewrite the lyrics in a Holiday Inn. Westerberg recalled, "I was hungover. So we started with the quiet guitar, and everything fell in from there." According to one source, the song was originally "about a guy driving to a water tower intending to kill himself....probably on the pleas of some A&R person that suicide does not sell records, the lyrics were slightly altered and horns were added...Although the song never came close to charting, it was considered one of the band's best."

On the final recording, the song features Big Star's Alex Chilton on guitar; the band were longtime fans of Chilton and paid tribute to him on the album with the song "Alex Chilton." This recording also featured horns from members of the Memphis Horns as well as strings from Memphis State University's Max Huls. Though he reluctantly consented to the horns, Westerberg objected to the strings, commenting, "It's like the Replacements trying to sound like 1968, in [our] own feeble way."

== Release ==
"Can't Hardly Wait" was released as the third single from the band's 1987 Pleased to Meet Me. The B-side, a version of Sons of the Pioneers' "Cool Water," features vocals by drummer Chris Mars.

In 2020, a music video for "Can't Hardly Wait" was released to promote the upcoming deluxe edition of Pleased to Meet Me. The video was created using extra 1987 footage from the music video for the band's song "The Ledge," also from Pleased to Meet Me. The video for "The Ledge," a song written about suicide, was rejected by MTV for "objectionable song content," so the footage was reused in 1987 for another track from the album, "Alex Chilton."

Two alternate versions of the song appeared on the deluxe edition of Pleased to Meet Me: a rough mix of the song and a remix of the song produced by Jimmy Iovine.

== Critical reception ==
Kory Grow of Rolling Stone called the song one of the two "all-time classics" from Pleased to Meet Me, the other being "Alex Chilton." He described the track as a "mellow love letter." Kristine McKenna of The LA Times was similarly glowing in her praise of the song, writing, "'Can't Hardly Wait' is the most dizzyingly romantic tune Westerberg has written yet."

The song has been ranked by many music writers as one of the best Replacements songs. Ultimate Classic Rock and PopMatters both ranked it as their second best song, with the latter calling it "one of the best pop songs ever written, a brilliant, inspired masterpiece." Louder ranked it as their third best, while Diffuser.fm ranked it sixth and The Guardian ranked the Tim demo version of the song seventh.

== In popular culture ==
The 1998 film Can't Hardly Wait was named after the song, and the song features over the end credits.
