= I'll Be You =

1989 single by the Replacements

Single by The Replacements

from the album Don't Tell a Soul
- Released: April 1989
- Recorded: 1988–89
- Genre: Rock
- Length: 3:27
- Label: Sire/Reprise
- Songwriter: Paul Westerberg
- Producer: Matt Wallace

The Replacements singles chronology
"Cruella DeVille" (1988)	"I'll Be You" (1989)	"Achin' to Be" (1989)

"I'll Be You" is a song by the American rock band The Replacements. It was written by lead singer Paul Westerberg and released as the lead single from the band's sixth studio album Don't Tell a Soul in 1989 . After being singled out by Reprise executive Lenny Waronker as a potential hit, the song was heavily promoted by the label and became the band's only single to chart on the Billboard Hot 100, peaking at number 51.

The song has since seen critical acclaim and its lyric of "rebel without a clue," was later quoted by the band's tourmates Tom Petty and the Heartbreakers on their 1991 song "Into the Great Wide Open."

== Background ==
After years of moderate success on the college rock circuit, the Replacements sought a chart hit with "I'll Be You." Reprise executive Lenny Waronker singled out the song as a potential hit, though he only greenlit the single after the band and producer Matt Wallace revised the song. In reality, the band made few changes; frontman Paul Westerberg joked, "Lenny couldn't figure out what we'd done to it, but he loved it! So we really felt like we'd pulled one over on the old man."

Lyrically, the song is sung from the perspective of a "rebel without a clue," a line quoted by Tom Petty and the Heartbreakers on their 1991 song "Into the Great Wide Open." Petty and the Heartbreakers had toured with the Replacements after the release of Don't Tell a Soul and keyboardist Benmont Tench, who had been a fan of the band, often joined the band to play "I'll Be You."

== Release ==
Released as the first single from Don't Tell a Soul, "I'll Be You" became the band's first and only Billboard Hot 100 single, peaking at number 51. The song also reached the top of the Modern Rock Tracks and Album Rock Tracks charts (both of which were based entirely on radio airplay rather than sales).

Replacements co-manager Gary Hobbib recalled, "I remember being in some store and the song was playing and a group of little girls were singing along." Westerberg commented, "We were noticing the audience was doubling at our shows and all of them came because they heard 'I'll Be You.' And a couple of nights, in our own fashion, we even forgot to play the damn thing. Once we started to get hip to it, we would play it right off the bat and half the people would leave."

Ultimately, despite the moderate commercial success, the single underperformed and the song failed to crack the Top 40. Westerberg recalled, "When 'I'll Be You' dropped off ... I was going, 'Damn.' But now I go, 'Great,' because now it's not like 'I'll Be You' is number one and I'll have to play it for the rest of my life. Next year no one will even remember it so I can play whatever I want."

== Reception ==
Rolling Stone wrote described the song as "the record's most engaging tune" and characterized it as "a cry of disillusionment, sung with mounting desperation." Stephen Thomas Erlewine of AllMusic named the song one of the band's "finest" and wrote that the song's "urgency masks its melancholy." The Austin Chronicle also dubbed the song one of "Paul Westerberg's finest tunes," while Pitchfork wrote that "'I'll Be You' completely transcends its production and could fight for a spot in an all-time Replacements top 10."

Diffuser.fm also ranked "I'll Be You" as the seventh best Replacements song.

== Track listing ==
1. "I'll Be You" - 3:27
2. "Date to Church" - 3:49

== Personnel ==
Personnel taken from Mixonline.

- Paul Westerberg – vocals, guitar
- Slim Dunlap – guitar
- Tommy Stinson – bass
- Chris Mars – drums

== Charts ==
Chart (1989)	Peak position
Canadian Singles Chart (RPM)	92
US Billboard Hot 100	51
US Billboard Modern Rock Tracks	1
US Billboard Album Rock Tracks	1

== See also ==
- List of Billboard number-one alternative singles of the 1980s
