= Slim Dunlap =

American guitarist and singer-songwriter (1951–2024)

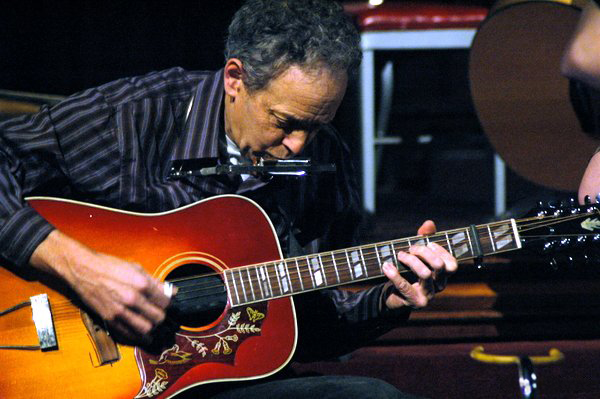
- Dunlap performing in 2007

Background information
- Born: Robert Bruce Dunlap; August 14, 1951; Plainview, Minnesota, U.S.
- Origin: Minneapolis, Minnesota, U.S.
- Died: December 18, 2024 (aged 73) Minneapolis, Minnesota, U.S.
- Genres: Rock music
- Occupations: Guitarist; singer-songwriter
- Instrument: Guitar
- Years active: 1971–2012
- Labels: Twin/Tone; Restless
- Formerly of: Mrs. Frubb; Spooks; Thumbs Up; The Replacements

Robert Bruce "Slim" Dunlap (August 14, 1951 – December 18, 2024) was an American rock musician. He was a Minnesota-based guitarist and singer-songwriter who was best known as a member of the Replacements from 1987 to 1991, replacing original lead guitarist Bob Stinson. Dunlap also recorded two solo albums in the mid-1990s.

Dunlap was influenced by Hank Williams and Keith Richards, and has been called "one of the last old-school cool guitar players". Ralph Heibutzki at AllMusic said that he "epitomizes the journeyman musician who plays for the fun of it, when his day gig allows". His solo albums earned praise from Bruce Springsteen, who called them "really, deeply soulful and beautiful."

Minneapolis music writer Jim Walsh called Dunlap "the epitome of constraint. He plays what he wants when he wants, and because of that and so many other reasons, he is nothing short of a gunslinger—showing up at bars only occasionally, and when he does, shooting out the lights with a bluesman's salt-of-the-earth style."

== Early life ==
Slim Dunlap was born on August 14, 1951, in Plainview, Minnesota. Replacements biographer Bob Mehr wrote that Dunlap's family was a "distinguished clan of newsmen, lawyers, and politicians" and that Dunlap "had been expected to follow their path." His grandfather, Roy Dunlap Sr., was the managing editor of the St. Paul Pioneer Press and Dispatch newspaper for 35 years, and was succeeded as managing editor by his son and Slim's uncle Roy Jr. Slim's father, Robert Rankin Dunlap, was a lawyer and World War II veteran who moved to Plainview in 1946 with his wife, Jane. The couple had five children, Slim being the third. Slim's father also was elected to five terms in the Minnesota Senate as a Republican, where he served from 1953 to 1967, and was Wabasha County Attorney from 1950 to 1952. He was also an amateur piano player fond of Hoagy Carmichael. Dunlap told Mehr that he thought this was why his father allowed him to pursue a risky career as a musician: "That's probably why he tolerated my ambitions toward music and would help me along, even though he worried about it."

As a boy, Dunlap was "highly intelligent, somewhat eccentric, and incredibly skinny," according to Mehr. The nickname Slim, which would stick with him for life, began as a childhood playground taunt.

Dunlap started playing guitar when he was about ten. At first, he borrowed his older sister's guitar, but his father bought him his first six-string as a teenager. Dunlap said that he practiced for hours every day for years, often late into the night.

The family moved to the nearby, larger city of Rochester when Dunlap was beginning high school. By this point Dunlap was an indifferent student who often skipped class and was more interested in hitch-hiking to see the country, inspired by Woody Guthrie's autobiography Bound For Glory. His father "had to pull strings to get his son a diploma," Mehr wrote.

Dunlap enrolled at the University of Minnesota in Minneapolis in 1969, but dropped out after about a year, more interested in the legend of Bob Dylan's life in nearby Dinkytown. Dunlap formed his first band, a Small Faces-inspired combo called Mrs. Frubb, around this time. He met his future wife, Christine, in 1971 at a Mrs. Frubb show.

== Career ==
=== With Curtiss A ===
In the early 1970s, Dunlap teamed up with Minneapolis rock musician and visual artist Curtiss A, also known as Curt Almsted, and together they formed Thumbs Up, an "unusual mix of rhythm and blues with pop [that] has been described as early new wave". He also joined Almsted's punk-rock group Spooks, and featured on all but one of Spooks's albums.

=== With the Replacements ===
Dunlap's work with Almsted established himself as an "intuitive, reliable musician who could fit any situation", and he attracted the attention of Paul Westerberg of the Replacements, a Minnesota-based punk/alternative rock band. Westerberg was looking for a guitarist to replace Bob Stinson, who had been asked to leave in the mid-1980s because of his drug and alcohol problems, and approached Dunlap. Dunlap initially turned down the offer, but joined the Replacements in 1987 on account of "his admiration for Westerberg's songwriting". Dunlap's day job at the time was working as a janitor at First Avenue, a nightclub in Minneapolis, the same venue where the Replacements had launched their career in the early 1980s. His wife, Chrissie, was also a former First Avenue staffer. Dunlap became the "replacement Replacement", and remained with the band until their breakup in 1991, featuring on their last two studio albums.

=== Solo career ===
Dunlap was not driven to be a bandleader, once saying "I hate it, personally. I'd rather just play guitar and let the other guy lose all the money." He also took a small-scale approach to recording, spending less than $10,000 on his first post-Replacements solo record, compared to more than $200,000 for the other members' solo albums.

In 1991 Dunlap toured with ex-Georgia Satellites lead vocalist Dan Baird to promote Baird's solo album, Love Songs for the Hearing Impaired.

Towards the end of 1992 Dunlap started recording his own first solo album, The Old New Me, which was released in 1993. It was followed by his second solo album, Times Like This, in 1996. His former bandmate Curtiss A played harmonica on both records. AllMusic called The Old New Me a "rootsy, engaging ride", and Times Like This "the opposite of the Replacements' rowdy, unscripted alt-rock vitriol [that] wins on its own unobtrusive terms". Ira Robbins of Trouser Press praised his solo albums for their "raunch-a-roll energy and an invigorating dose of retro flair."

Dunlap performed at The Bottom Line in New York City in December 1997, and he and his own band were active in the Minneapolis area until February 2012 when he was hospitalized after suffering a severe stroke.

=== Songs for Slim ===
After Dunlap's stroke, a non-profit project, Songs For Slim, was established to raise money for him by having other artists cover his songs and other merchandise. The releases included an EP by his former bandmates from the Replacements, Songs for Slim, featuring cover art by Chris Mars. The EP included a version of Dunlap's song "Busted Up" as well as "Everything's Coming Up Roses" from the musical Gypsy, Gordon Lightfoot's "I'm Not Sayin'", and Hank Williams's "Lost Highway".

=== Thank You Dancers! ===
A live album, Thank You Dancers!, was released in 2020, and featured a performance recorded in 2002 at St. Paul's Turf Club.

Dunlap earned the respect of many other musicians. Nashville singer-songwriter Tommy Womack, in his 2002 song "The Replacements", wrote that "Slim Dunlap is the proof of the existence of God, a guitar genius, a role model, a credit to the gene pool."

== Death ==
Dunlap died at his home in Minneapolis on December 18, 2024, at the age of 73. In a statement, Dunlap's family said the cause of death was complications from his 2012 stroke. He died shortly after listening to his song "I Dreamed of a Hillbilly Heaven", from his live album Thank You Dancers!

== Honors and awards ==
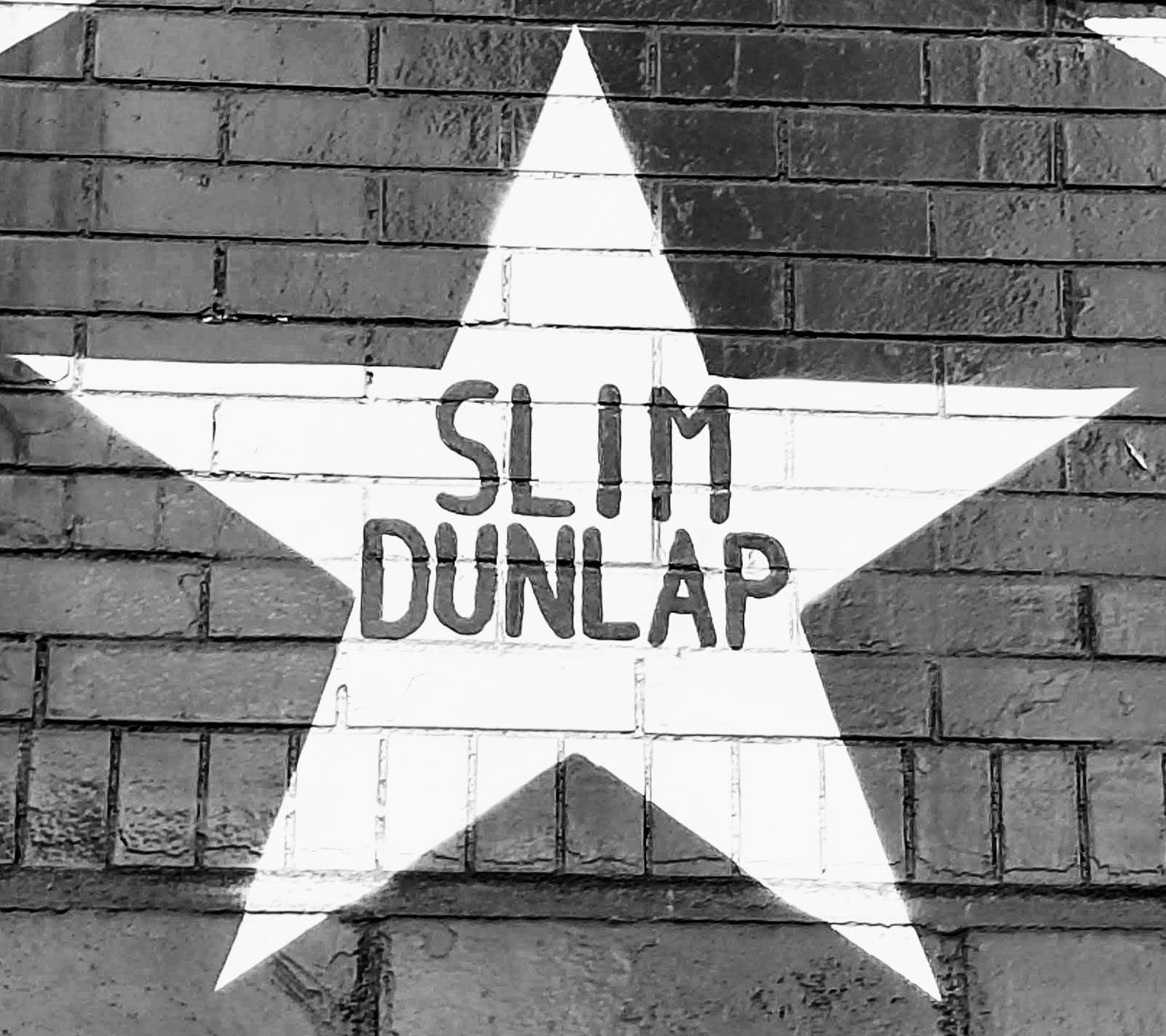
Star honoring Slim Dunlap on the outside mural of the Minneapolis nightclub First Avenue

Dunlap was honored with a star on the outside mural of the Minneapolis nightclub First Avenue, recognizing performers that have played sold-out shows or have otherwise demonstrated a major contribution to the culture at the iconic venue. Receiving a star "might be the most prestigious public honor an artist can receive in Minneapolis," according to journalist Steve Marsh.

== Solo discography ==
The Old New Me
Review scores
Source	Rating
AllMusic	4/5 stars
MusicHound Rock	3.5/4 stars

Times Like This
Review scores
Source	Rating
AllMusic	3/5 stars
MusicHound Rock	3.5/4 stars

- The Old New Me (1993, Twin/Tone Records)
- Times Like This (1996, Restless Records)
- Thank You Dancers! (2020)
