= Don't You Know Who I Think I Was? =

2006 greatest-hits album by the Replacements

Greatest hits album by The Replacements
- Released: June 3, 2006
- Recorded: 1980–2006
- Genre: College rock
- Length: 65:13
- Label: Sire/Reprise/Rhino

The Replacements chronology
All for Nothing / Nothing for All (1997)	Don't You Know Who I Think I Was? (2006)	Songs for Slim (2013)

Professional ratings
Review scores
Source	Rating
Allmusic	4.5/5 stars
Blender	5/5 stars
Pitchfork Media	(8.8/10)
Rolling Stone	5/5 stars

Don't You Know Who I Think I Was? is a greatest hits album by the American rock band The Replacements, released in 2006 by Rhino Records. It includes eighteen tracks spanning the band's eight studio releases from 1981 to 1990, as well as two new tracks recorded specifically for this release. The new tracks—"Message to the Boys" and "Pool & Dive"—feature the three surviving original band members: singer and guitarist Paul Westerberg, bass guitarist Tommy Stinson, and drummer Chris Mars. However, Mars does not play drums on these tracks: they were played by session drummer Josh Freese while Mars sang backing vocals.

The album art is from the music video for "Alex Chilton". Westerberg stated in a 2006 interview with Newsweek that he had written "Message to the Boys" many years ago.

== Track listing ==
All tracks are written by Paul Westerberg, except where noted.

No.	Title	Writer(s)	Length
1.	"Takin' a Ride" (from Sorry Ma, Forgot to Take Out the Trash, 1981)		2:23
2.	"Shiftless When Idle" (from Sorry Ma, Forgot to Take Out the Trash, 1981)		2:18
3.	"Kids Don't Follow" (from The Replacements Stink, 1982)		2:50
4.	"Color Me Impressed" (from Hootenanny, 1983)		2:27
5.	"Within Your Reach" (from Hootenanny, 1983)		4:24
6.	"I Will Dare" (from Let It Be, 1984)		3:19
7.	"Answering Machine" (from Let It Be, 1984)		3:40
8.	"Unsatisfied" (from Let It Be, 1984)		4:02
9.	"Here Comes a Regular" (from Tim, 1985)		4:49
10.	"Kiss Me on the Bus" (from Tim, 1985)		2:54
11.	"Bastards of Young" (from Tim, 1985)		3:37
12.	"Left of the Dial" (from Tim, 1985)		3:43
13.	"Alex Chilton" (from Pleased to Meet Me, 1987)	Westerberg, Tommy Stinson, Chris Mars	3:13
14.	"Skyway" (from Pleased to Meet Me, 1987)		2:05
15.	"Can't Hardly Wait" (from Pleased to Meet Me, 1987)		3:04
16.	"Achin' to Be" (from Don't Tell a Soul, 1989)		3:41
17.	"I'll Be You" (from Don't Tell a Soul, 1989)		3:29
18.	"Merry Go Round" (from All Shook Down, 1990)		3:40
19.	"Message to the Boys" (previously unreleased)		3:27
20.	"Pool & Dive" (previously unreleased)		2:07

== Personnel ==
- Ed Ackerson – engineer
- John Akre – engineer
- Paul Berry – assistant engineer
- Michael Bosley – engineer
- Peter Buck – guitar, track 6
- Alex Chilton – guitar, backing vocals
- Reggie Collins – discographical annotation
- Jim Dickinson – producer, tracks 13–15
- Peter Doell – engineer
- Teenage Steve Douglas – baritone saxophone
- Charley Drayton – drums
- Slim Dunlap – guitar
- East Memphis Slim – keyboards, vibraphone
- Tommy Erdelyi – producer
- Sheryl Farber – editorial supervision
- Steven Fjelstad – producer, engineer
- John Hampton – engineer, mixing
- Heidi Hanschu – engineer
- Joe Hardy – engineer, mixing
- Dan Hersch – remastering
- Darren Hill – producer
- Bill Holdship – liner Notes
- Max Huls – strings
- Bill Inglot – remastering
- Peter Jesperson – producer
- John Beverly Jones – engineer
- Karen LeBlanc – project assistant
- Laura Levine – photography
- Lisa Liese – product manager
- Scott Litt – producer, engineer, mixing, track 18
- Chris Lord-Alge – mixing
- Andrew Love – tenor saxophone
- Chris Mars – drums, tambourine, backing vocals, cowbell, foot stomping
- Pat McDougal – engineer
- Clif Norrell – engineer
- James O'Toole – project assistant
- Paul Stark – producer
- Bob Stinson – lead guitar
- Tommy Stinson – acoustic guitar, bass
- Maria Villar – project assistant
- Paul Westerberg – acoustic guitar, harmonica, mandolin, percussion, piano, electric guitar, vocals, producer, 6-string bass, lap steel guitar, 12-string electric guitar, 12-string acoustic guitar
- Jeff White – project assistant
- Mason Williams – producer
