= I Will Dare =

1984 single by The Replacements

Single by The Replacements

from the album Let It Be
- Released: July 1984
- Genre: Alternative rock
- Length: 3:18
- Label: Twin/Tone
- Songwriter: Paul Westerberg

The Replacements singles chronology
"I Will Dare" (1984)	"Bastards of Young" (1985)

"I Will Dare" is a song by American alternative rock band The Replacements, written by Paul Westerberg. The song's pop stylings were a departure from the band's punk origins and its lyrics reflected the band's willingness to "dare to do anything." The track also features guitar performed by Peter Buck of R.E.M.

The song was released as a single on independent record label Twin/Tone Records in July 1984, shortly before the release of the band's album Let It Be that October, on which the song served as the opening track. The song has since seen critical acclaim and has been named by music writers as one of the band's best songs.

== Background ==
"I Will Dare" was written by Replacements frontman Paul Westerberg shortly after the band completed their Hootenanny album. According to producer Peter Jesperson, Westerberg attempted to get the song onto Hootenanny: "I got a call from Paul saying, 'I've just finished the best song I've ever written. We need to record it now.' But the record was already done, so we couldn't do it."

Westerberg has called the song as an answer to U2's "I Will Follow" and has also described the track as "a kind of love song." He further noted that the song's title was an apt motto for the band, and said, "We'll dare to flop [. . .] We'll dare to do anything."

The song is based on a shuffle rhythm and features Paul Westerberg playing a mandolin. Peter Buck of R.E.M. plays guitar on the song, including the solo after lead guitarist Bob Stinson couldn't come up with an adequate solo himself. Buck recalled, "I was just sitting there, and Bob said something like, 'I can't play a solo on this fucking thing.' Those weren't his chords. And Paul goes, 'Hey, Peter, you do it.'"

== Release ==
"I Will Dare" was released as the opening track and debut single from the band's 1984 album Let It Be. Though it did not reach any national charts, the song was a college radio hit, reaching number one on 55 college radio stations and saw play on local stations in Chicago and Long Island.

For the single release, "I Will Dare" was backed by cover recordings of T.Rex's "20th Century Boy" and Hank Williams' "Hey Good Lookin'." The cover of "Hey Good Lookin'" was recorded at a club performance in Madison, Wisconsin. Although Replacements guitarist Bob Stinson claimed his guitar solo on the recording was deliberately off-key, Stinson tried to grab the tape of the recording from his bandmates as they replayed it endlessly and laughed at the solo after the show.

A 1986 live recording of the song is found on the 2017 album For Sale: Live at Maxwell's 1986.

== Critical reception ==
AllMusic writes that the song "stands as perhaps the band's most beloved song and is a touchstone for their mid-'80s heyday, not to mention its status in the jangle and college rock canons."

The song has been ranked by many music writers as one of the best Replacements songs. Ultimate Classic Rock ranked the song as the best Replacements song, calling it "As bouncy, jangly and infectious as an early Beatles hit." PopMatters named it their fifth best song, dubbing it "without a doubt the band's most consumable and forthright pop song" and calling it the best opening track on any Replacements album. Diffuser.fm ranked it the band's ninth best song.

The song has been included in The Rock and Roll Hall of Fame's 500 Songs that Shaped Rock and Roll.

== Track listing ==
1. "I Will Dare" (Westerberg) – 3:18
2. "20th Century Boy" (Bolan)
3. "Hey Good Lookin'" (Williams)

== Personnel ==
Personnel taken from Let It Be liner notes

The Replacements

- Chris Mars – drums, tambourine
- Bob Stinson – lead guitar
- Tommy Stinson – bass guitar
- Paul Westerberg – vocals, 12-string electric rhythm guitar, mandolin, production

Additional musician

- Peter Buck – guitar solo
