= Let It Be (The Replacements album) =

1984 album by the Replacements

Studio album by the Replacements
- Released: October 2, 1984
- Recorded: August 1983 – February 1984
- Studios: Blackberry Way Studios, Minneapolis
- Genres: Post-punk; indie rock; alternative rock; college rock
- Length: 33:31
- Label: Twin/Tone
- Producers: Steve Fjelstad, Peter Jesperson, Paul Westerberg

The Replacements chronology
Hootenanny (1983)	Let It Be (1984)	Tim (1985)

Singles from Let It Be
- 1. "I Will Dare" Released: July 1984

Let It Be is the third studio album by American rock band the Replacements. It was released on October 2, 1984, by Twin/Tone Records. A post-punk album with coming-of-age themes, Let It Be was recorded by the band after they had grown tired of playing loud and fast exclusively as on their 1983 Hootenanny album; the group decided to write songs that were, according to vocalist Paul Westerberg, "a little more sincere."

Let It Be was acclaimed by music critics and later ranked among the greatest albums of the 1980s by AllMusic and Rolling Stone magazine. Now considered a classic, Let It Be is frequently included on professional lists of the all-time best rock albums, being ranked number 156 on Rolling Stone's 2023 list of the 500 greatest albums of all time. The album was remastered and reissued in 2008, with six additional tracks and liner notes by Peter Jesperson.

== Background ==
The Replacements started their career as a punk rock band but had gradually grown beyond the straightforward hardcore of initial albums like Stink. Westerberg recalls that "playing that kind of noisy, fake hardcore rock was getting us nowhere, and it wasn't a lot of fun. This was the first time I had songs that we arranged, rather than just banging out riffs and giving them titles." By 1983, the band would sometimes perform a set of cover songs intended to antagonize whoever was in the audience. Westerberg explained that the punks who made up their audience "thought that's what they were supposed to be standing for, like 'Anybody does what they want' and 'There are no rules' [...] But there were rules and you couldn't do that, and you had to be fast, and you had to wear black, and you couldn't wear a plaid shirt with flares ... So we'd play the DeFranco Family, that kind of shit, just to piss 'em off."

Peter Buck of R.E.M. was originally rumored to produce the album. Buck later confirmed that the band did consider him as a possible producer, but when they met Buck in Athens, Georgia, the band did not have enough material. Buck did manage to contribute to the album in a limited capacity; he said, "I was kind of there for pre-production stuff, did one solo, gave 'em some ideas."

== Music and lyrics ==
Westerberg's lyrics feature themes of self-consciousness and rejection as felt by awkward youths, and deal with topics such as generational discontent on "Unsatisfied", uncontrollable arousal on "Gary's Got a Boner", and callow sexuality on "Sixteen Blue". According to music critic Stephen Thomas Erlewine, the album's coming-of-age theme is aligned between adolescence and adulthood, and unlike many other adolescent-themed post-punk records, Let It Be remains less on the subject of angst and incorporates humor and more varied music.

== Packaging and title ==
The cover of Let It Be is a photograph of the band sitting on the roof of Bob and Tommy Stinson's mother's house taken by Daniel Corrigan. Michael Azerrad stated that the cover was a "great little piece of mythmaking," showcasing each band member's personality via how they appear in the photograph. (As of 2019, the current owners of the house had added a stained-glass window reproducing the album-cover photograph.) The album's title is a reference to the 1970 album Let It Be by the Beatles; Westerberg recalled:

We were going to call it Whistler's Mammy, and then we were going to call it Stunk. And then we decided that the next song that came on the radio was going to be the album title. The next thing you know, "When I find myself in times of trouble..." comes on the radio.

The reference was partially intended as a joke on the Replacements' manager, Peter Jesperson, who was a huge Beatles fan. Westerberg has stated the name was "our way of saying that nothing is sacred, that the Beatles were just a fine rock & roll band. We were seriously gonna call the next record Let It Bleed."

== Critical reception ==
Retrospective professional ratings
Review scores
Source	Rating
AllMusic	5/5 stars
Christgau's Record Guide	A+
NME	8/10
Pitchfork	10/10 (2008); 9.0/10 (2025)
Q	4/5 stars
Record Collector	5/5 stars
Rolling Stone	5/5 stars
The Rolling Stone Album Guide	5/5 stars
Spin	5/5 stars
Spin Alternative Record Guide	10/10

Reviewing for The Village Voice in 1984, music critic Robert Christgau said that the band has matured by incorporating melody in their music and felt that they succeed by writing about their likes and dislikes rather than adhering to garage rock principles. Debby Miller of Rolling Stone magazine called it a "brilliant rock & roll album" and wrote that, instead of the rugged, up-tempo rock of the band's first two albums, Let It Be has "an amazing range" of musical ideas. Bruce Pavitt, writing in The Rocket, called the album "mature, diverse rock that could well shoot these regional boys into the national mainstream." Let It Be was voted the fourth best album of the year in The Village Voice's annual Pazz & Jop critics' poll for 1984. Christgau, the poll's creator, ranked it second best on his own list, and in a decade-end list for the newspaper, named it the tenth best album of the 1980s. He later said that, along with X's 1981 album Wild Gift, Let It Be represented the peak of American indie rock.

In a retrospective review, eMusic's Karen Schoemer said that Let It Be is "as classic as rock & roll could be" and cited it as a cornerstone album of alternative rock, along with R.E.M.'s Murmur, the Pixies' Surfer Rosa, and Sonic Youth's Daydream Nation. Eric Boehlert of Salon called it a "post-punk classic". Singer-songwriter Colin Meloy wrote of Let It Be in an edition of the 33⅓ series dedicated to the album: "I listened to Let It Be endlessly. The record seemed to encapsulate perfectly all of the feelings that were churning inside me [...] Paul Westerberg's weary voice sounded from my boombox and I trembled to think that here I was, thirteen and the 'hardest age' was still three years in the making." In a 2005 review, Rolling Stone's Christian Hoard wrote that the Replacements "had no use for the principles or oblique artiness" of contemporary indie rock bands such as Sonic Youth and Hüsker Dü, and concluded that "few albums so brilliantly evoke the travails of growing up, and even fewer have so perfectly captured a young band in all its ragged glory."

Let It Be has frequently been included on professional lists of the all-time best rock albums. In 2003, Rolling Stone ranked it at number 239 on its list of 'The 500 Greatest Albums of All Time' and called it "a post-punk masterpiece", slipping to number 241 in a 2012 revision, but climbing to number 156 in the 2020 reboot of the list. In 1989, the magazine had also rated it at #15 on its list of 100 best albums of the '80s. In the 1999 miniseries "VH1's 100 Greatest Albums of Rock and Roll," VH1 ranked Let It Be #79. Pitchfork rated the album at #29 on their 100 Best Albums of the 1980s. Spin ranked it #12 on their list of the 25 Greatest albums of all time. Slant Magazine listed the album at #39 on its list of "Best Albums of the 1980s". The opening track of the album, "I Will Dare", has been inducted in the Rock and Roll Hall of Fame's 500 Songs that Shaped Rock and Roll.

== Track listing ==
All tracks are written by Paul Westerberg, unless otherwise indicated.

Side one
No.	Title	Writer(s)	Length
1.	"I Will Dare"		3:18
2.	"Favorite Thing"	Westerberg, Tommy Stinson, Bob Stinson, Chris Mars	2:19
3.	"We're Comin' Out"	Westerberg, T. Stinson, B. Stinson, Mars	2:21
4.	"Tommy Gets His Tonsils Out"	Westerberg, T. Stinson, B. Stinson, Mars	1:53
5.	"Androgynous"		3:11
6.	"Black Diamond"	Paul Stanley	2:40

Side two
No.	Title	Writer(s)	Length
7.	"Unsatisfied"		4:01
8.	"Seen Your Video"		3:08
9.	"Gary's Got a Boner"	Westerberg, T. Stinson, B. Stinson, Mars, Ted Nugent	2:28
10.	"Sixteen Blue"		4:24
11.	"Answering Machine"		3:40
Total length:			33:31

Deluxe edition bonus tracks
No.	Title	Writer(s)	Length
12.	"20th Century Boy" (originally performed by T. Rex; from "I Will Dare", 1984)	Marc Bolan	3:56
13.	"Perfectly Lethal"		3:30
14.	"Temptation Eyes" (originally performed by the Grass Roots)	Harvey Price, Dan Walsh	2:30
15.	"Answering Machine" (Demo)		2:43
16.	"Heartbeat – It's a Lovebeat" (originally performed by the DeFranco Family)	Michael Kennedy, William Hudspeth	2:55
17.	"Sixteen Blue" (Alternate vocal)		5:08
Total length:			54:13

2025 Deluxe edition, disc one (original album)
No.	Title	Writer(s)	Length
1.	"I Will Dare"		3:18
2.	"Favorite Thing"	Westerberg, T. Stinson, B. Stinson, Mars	2:19
3.	"We're Comin' Out"	Westerberg, T. Stinson, B. Stinson, Mars	2:21
4.	"Tommy Gets His Tonsils Out"	Westerberg, T. Stinson, B. Stinson, Mars	1:53
5.	"Androgynous"		3:11
6.	"Black Diamond"	Stanley	2:40
7.	"Unsatisfied"		4:01
8.	"Seen Your Video"		3:08
9.	"Gary's Got a Boner"	Westerberg, T, Stinson, B. Stinson, Mars, Nugent	2:28
10.	"Sixteen Blue"		4:24
11.	"Answering Machine"		3:40

Disc two (Kiss My Grassroots: Rarities & B-Sides)
No.	Title	Writer(s)	Length
1.	"Gary's Got a Boner" (Alternate Version)	Westerberg, T, Stinson, B. Stinson, Mars, Nugent	2:34
2.	"Favorite Thing" (Alternate Version)	Westerberg, T. Stinson, B. Stinson, Mars	2:20
3.	"Perfectly Lethal"		3:29
4.	"Temptation Eyes"	Harvey Price, Dan Walsh	2:28
5.	"Who's Gonna Take Us Alive"		3:26
6.	"Heartbeat, It's a Lovebeat"	Kennedy, Hudspeth	2:54
7.	"Answering Machine" (Home Demo #1)		2:41
8.	"Answering Machine" (Home Demo #2)		2:39
9.	"Street Girl" (Takes 1 & 2)		3:41
10.	"Sixteen Blue" (Alternate Version)		4:44
11.	"Unsatisfied" (Full Length Version)		4:25
12.	"Androgynous" (Alternate Version)		3:09
13.	"20th Century Boy"	Bolan	3:55
14.	"Hey Good Lookin'" (Live)	Hank Williams	2:47

Disc three (Goodnight! Go Home!: Live at Cubby Bear, Chicago, IL, August 17, 1984)
No.	Title	Writer(s)	Length
1.	"Can't Hardly Wait"		3:15
2.	"Left in the Dark"	Ken Draznik	2:51
3.	"Unsatisfied"		2:44
4.	"I Will Dare"		3:34
5.	"Favorite Thing"	Westerberg, T. Stinson, B. Stinson, Mars	2:41
6.	"Kids Don't Follow"		2:33
7.	"Run It"		1:15
8.	"Color Me Impressed"		2:48
9.	"Hayday"		1:54
10.	"Nowhere Is My Home"		4:33
11.	"Love You Till Friday"		2:30
12.	"Help Me Rhonda / Little G.T.O."	Brian Wilson, Mike Love, John Buck Wilkin	4:58
13.	"Takin' A Ride"		2:35
14.	"Tommy Gets His Tonsils Out"	Westerberg, T. Stinson, B. Stinson, Mars	1:48
15.	"Gary's Got a Boner"	Westerberg, T, Stinson, B. Stinson, Mars, Nugent	2:34
16.	"Johnny's Gonna Die"		3:53
17.	"Can't Get Enough"	Mick Ralphs	2:43
18.	"I'm In Trouble"		2:13
19.	"Don't Ask Why"		1:50
20.	"Take Me Down to The Hospital"		3:11
21.	"Shiftless When Idle"		2:48
22.	"Mr. Whirly"		1:50
23.	"Hitchin' A Ride"	Mitch Murray, Peter Callander	2:51
24.	"Black Diamond"	Stanley	2:42
25.	"20th Century Boy"	Bolan	3:12
26.	"Go"		2:34
27.	"Gimme Noise"	Westerberg, T, Stinson, B. Stinson, Mars	1:47
28.	"White and Lazy"		2:17

== Personnel ==
The Replacements

- Chris Mars – drums, percussion
- Bob Stinson – lead guitar (all except "Answering Machine")
- Tommy Stinson – bass guitar, harmony vocals on "Black Diamond"
- Paul Westerberg – lead vocals, rhythm guitar, piano, mandolin on "I Will Dare", 12-string electric guitar on “I Will Dare” and "Sixteen Blue", lapsteel on "Unsatisfied", percussion on "Androgynous" and "Answering Machine", production

Additional musicians

- Peter Buck – guitar solo on "I Will Dare"
- Chan Poling – piano on "Sixteen Blue"

Technical personnel

- Steve Fjelstad – production
- Peter Jesperson – production

== Charts ==
Chart performance for Let It Be
Chart (2025)	Peak position
US Top Album Sales (Billboard)	33
