= Anonymous Botch =

Studio album by Chris Mars
- Released: September 24, 1996
- Studios: Pine Box Studios, Minnesota
- Genres: Alternative, indie rock
- Length: 42:09
- Label: Bar/None
- Producer: Chris Mars

Chris Mars chronology
Tenterhooks (1995)	Anonymous Botch (1996)

Anonymous Botch is the fourth solo album by former Replacements drummer Chris Mars. It was released on September 24, 1996, on Bar/None Records.

== Production ==
Mars writes all the songs and plays most of the instruments on all of his solo albums. This time adding into his foray brass instruments, cello, keyboards, piano & violin. Minneapolis computer repairman Chuck Whitney plays the theremin.

According to Bar/None Records' website, Anonymous Botch "features a plethora of famous mystery guests, many of whose contractual obligations with other record labels prevent them from being credited here," and that Mars "forfeits the skins (a career first) to the biggest, hottest drummer this side of Keith Moon, but his band doesn't know he's on the record." It also implies that the female vocals on "Janet's New Kidney" is Courtney Love. Other fan guesses at who could be dueting with Mars on "Janet's New Kidney" include Juliana Hatfield (who recorded an album with Replacements frontman Paul Westerberg}, Liz Phair & Kristin Hersh.

== Critical reception ==
As with his three prior solo albums, the big knock on Anonymous Botch is Mars' lack of vocal ability. Detroit Free Press critic Steve Byrne noted that "Mars' stuffy nose deadpan is the lone consistency on the very strange Anonymous Botch. To call it eclectic would be a compliment: to call it real listenable would be an exaggeration."

== Track listing ==
All tracks are written by Chris Mars.

No.	Title	Length
1.	"Moo"	0:04
2.	"The Conquering Cow Farmer"	3:08
3.	"Sheep Spine Shimmy"	2:39
4.	"Narrow"	3:32
5.	"The Down Drag"	4:13
6.	"Black Days"	2:51
7.	"Two Dreams"	3:59
8.	"It's A Long Life"	3:49
9.	"Janet's New Kidney"	3:02
10.	"The Weather"	3:55
11.	"Where & Why"	3:47
12.	"Funeral Hymn of The Small Critter Holocaust"	3:17
13.	"I'll Be Gone"	3:53
Total length:		42:09

The printed track listing on the CD does not include "Moo" and only lists 12 tracks. "Moo" was originally intended to be the opening of "The Conquering Cow Farmer." Due to a mastering glitch, "The Conquering Cow Farmer" is divided into two tracks. "Two Dreams" is a tribute to former Replacements bandmate Bob Stinson, who died from organ failure as a result of his drug use. "It's a Long Life" is an acidic putdown of a bogus DJ who won't play his songs (I know my songs will never get played there/You don't mean nothing to me).

== Personnel ==
- Chris Mars – bass guitar, brass, cello, drums and percussion, keyboards, piano, rhythm guitar, arrangement, engineering, mixing, producer, violin, vocals
- Chuck Whitney – Theremin
