= Songs for Slim =

2013 EP by the Replacements

EP by The Replacements
- Released: March 5, 2013
- Studios: Flowers Studio, Minneapolis, Minnesota
- Genre: Alternative rock
- Length: 13:57
- Label: New West
- Producer: Ed Ackerson

The Replacements chronology
Don't You Know Who I Think I Was? (2006)	Songs for Slim (2013)	For Sale: Live at Maxwell's 1986 (2017)

Songs for Slim is an EP by the Replacements on New West Records. The disbanded Replacements reunited to record the limited run EP as a benefit for former bandmate Slim Dunlap, who had suffered a stroke in February 2012.

Kevin Bowe replaces Dunlap on guitar with the Replacements & Peter Anderson is on drums. Former drummer Chris Mars designed the album art and contributed one song, "Radio Hook Word Hit". Mars plays all the instruments on the track. Songs for Slim was released on LP only, however, it was later made available for digital download.

== Track listing ==
Side A
No.	Title	Writer(s)	Length
1.	"Busted Up"	Slim Dunlap	3:27
2.	"Radio Hook Word Hit"	Dunlap	2:56

Side B
No.	Title	Writer(s)	Length
3.	"I'm Not Sayin'"	Gordon Lightfoot	3:07
4.	"Lost Highway"	Leon Payne	2:23
5.	"Everything's Coming Up Roses"	Stephen Sondheim, Jule Styne	2:04
Total length:			13:57

== Personnel ==
- Paul Westerberg - vocals, guitar, piano, tambourine
- Tommy Stinson - bass guitar, backing vocals
- Chris Mars - vocals, guitar, bass, drums on "Radio Hook World Hit"
- Kevin Bowe - guitar, backing vocals
- Peter Anderson - drums

Technical

- Ed Ackerson – producer

== Songs for Slim: Rockin Here Tonight, A Benefit Compilation for Slim Dunlap ==
Songs for Slim: Rockin Here Tonight, A Benefit Compilation for Slim Dunlap

Studio album by Various artists
- Released: November 12, 2013
- Genre: Alternative rock
- Length: 1:36:26
- Label: New West
- Producers: George Fontaine, Sr.

Besides the Replacements, several other friends and admirers of Dunlap's stepped up to release a series of limited-edition vinyl singles & EPs to raise money for his medical expenses. They were collected on a double CD tribute to Dunlap’s music outside of his work with the Replacements called Songs for Slim: Rockin Here Tonight, A Benefit Compilation for Slim Dunlap, also on New West Records. As a result of how the collection came together, three tracks ("Ballad of the Opening Band", "From the Git Go" & "Times Like This") appear on the collection twice.

"Busted Up" and "Radio Hook Word Hit" both appear on this collection as well. "Radio Hook Word Hit" is credited to Chris Mars. Mars again provides the cover art and contributes an original, "When I Fall Down". Mars wrote & plays all the instruments on the track. "When I Fall Down" reappears on Mars' 2017 solo album, Note to Self.

Paul Westerberg provides vocals & plays guitar on "Cozy" by Tim O'Reagan & Jim Boquist. New Replacements drummer Peter Anderson is one of the 'friends' on "Isn't It?" by Craig Finn & Friends. "Rockin Here Tonight" by The Minus 5 Feat. Curtiss A also features former R.E.M. guitarist Peter Buck. Along with the track "Just for The Hell of It", John Doe provides backing vocals on "Ain't No Fair (In A Rock 'N' Roll Love Affair)" by Jakob Dylan. LP.ORG, who provide "The Ballad of the Opening Band", is a pseudonym for the Jayhawks.

== Track listing ==
All tracks are written by Slim Dunlap, unless otherwise indicated.

Disc one: the 45s
No.	Title	Performed by	Length
1.	"Busted Up"	The Replacements	3:25
2.	"Radio Hook Word Hit"	Chris Mars	2:55
3.	"Times Like This"	Steve Earle	3:33
4.	"Isn't It?"	Craig Finn & Friends	3:41
5.	"Partners in Crime"	Lucinda Williams	4:10
6.	"Nowhere's Near"	Tommy Keene	4:15
7.	"Rockin Here Tonight"	The Minus 5 Feat. Curtiss A	3:24
8.	"Cozy"	Tim O'Reagan & Jim Boquist	3:15
9.	"Ain't No Fair (In A Rock 'N' Roll Love Affair)"	Jakob Dylan	3:22
10.	"Taken on The Chin"	Joe Henry	5:18
11.	"Just for The Hell of It"	John Doe	2:47
12.	"From the Git Go"	Deer Tick + Scott Lucas + Vanessa Carlton	3:10
13.	"The King & Queen"	Frank Black & the Suicide Commandos	4:09
14.	"Ain't Exactly Good"	You Am I	2:46
15.	"Hate This Town"	Patterson Hood & the Downtown Rumblers	4:02
16.	"Loud Loud Loud Loud Guitars"	The Young Fresh Fellows	3:46
17.	"The Ballad of the Opening Band"	Jeff Tweedy	4:28
18.	"From the Git Go"	Lucero	2:41

Disc two: Unreleased Bonus Tracks
No.	Title	Writer(s)	Performed by	Length
19.	"Laugh It Up (it's All A Big Joke Anyway)"		Peter Holsapple	2:36
20.	"Girlfriend"		John Eller	2:56
21.	"Little Shiva's Song"		Soul Asylum	1:45
22.	"Slim's Place"	Tad Hutchinson	The Young Fresh Fellows	2:15
23.	"Two by Two"		Bee, Louie & Brien	3:23
24.	"When I Fall Down"	Chris Mars	Chris Mars	3:42
25.	"Chrome Lipstick"		Chan Poling	3:59
26.	"Times Like This"		Frankie Lee	4:20
27.	"The Ballad of the Opening Band"		LP.ORG	4:14
28.	"Love Lost"	James Burton	The West Saugerties Ale & Quail Club Feat. John Sebastian	2:31
Total length:				96:26

== Personnel ==
- Val McCallum - Electric guitar on tracks 3, 5, 9, 10, 11
- Jay Bellerose - Drums on tracks 3, 9, 10, 11
- George Fontaine, Sr. - Executive-Producer
- MIke Ruthig - Executive-Producer
- Peter Jesperson - Series producer & liner notes
- Associate producers: Ben Perlstein, Chris Trovero & PD Larson
- Caroline Jaecks - Project coordinator
- Mastered by John Golden at Golden Mastering in Ventura, California.
