= Tenterhooks (disambiguation) =

Tenterhooks or tenter hooks are hooked nails used in the process of making woollen cloth.

Tenterhooks may also refer to:

- Tenterhooks (Chris Mars album), 1995
- Tenterhooks (Silversun Pickups album), 2026
- Tenterhooks Crevasses, a system of crevasses in the Rennick Glacier, Antarctica

== See also ==
- Tender Hooks, a 1988 Australian film
