= Tenterhooks (Chris Mars album) =

Studio album by Chris Mars
- Released: April 18, 1995
- Length: 42:36
- Label: Bar/None
- Producers: Chris Mars & Glenn Morrow

Chris Mars chronology
| 75% Less Fat (1993) | Tenterhooks (1995) | Anonymous Botch (1996) |

Tenterhooks is the third solo album by former Replacements drummer Chris Mars, released in 1995. Its title comes from the tenterhooks used to stretch cloth.

As with his previous two albums, Mars created the album artwork. His contract with Bar/None Records stipulated that he receive a $20,000, 16-track home studio, which he built in his living room.

== Songs ==
Mars spends much of Tenterhooks venting, albeit barely understandably due to over reverb. “White Patty Rap” is Mars' attempt at rapping about mall music. “Brother Song” is a tribute to former Replacements bandmate Bob Stinson, who died from organ failure as a result of his drug use (Sleep fast/Sleep well/Let all the monsters go back to hell). “E.I.B. Negative” offers his negative opinion of Rush Limbaugh. "Forkless Tree" offers an exposé of inbred/racist Bible-thumpers.

Mars chose not to tour in support of the album; instead, a band named the Wallmen promoted it, placing a cardboard model of Mars onstage.

== Critical reception ==
Professional ratings
Review scores
| Source | Rating |
|---|---|
| AllMusic | 4/5 stars |
| Entertainment Weekly | B− |
| Rolling Stone | 3.5/5 stars |
| MusicHound Rock | 3/4 stars |

Ken Lieck of The Austin Chronicle believed Tenterhooks "most sounds like is a demo. A good demo, but I’d rather have waited for the album." Trouser Press noted the "new-found fascination with an odd amalgamation of styles that run from rap & jazz to disco & Midwestern surf-rock—complete with kettledrums, strings & found sounds." Entertainment Weekly deemed the album "twisted, stylized, and strained, a concoction of decadent cocktail music."

Stereo Review called it "left-field, eclectic Brit-styled pop." Rolling Stone likened Mars's voice to that of Ray Davies. The Toronto Sun considered "White Patty Rap" to be "a contender for party song of the year."

AllMusic wrote: "As was evident on his first two releases, Mars has a distinctive voice, but the appeal of his vocals is limited, and it's likely only hardcore fans of his old band, the Replacements, would be willing to submit to it."

== Track listing ==
All tracks are written by Chris Mars.

| No. | Title | Length |
|---|---|---|
| 1. | "White Patty Rap" | 3:01 |
| 2. | "Forkless Tree" | 4:01 |
| 3. | "Mary" | 3:35 |
| 4. | "Lizard Brain" | 3:56 |
| 5. | "Hate It" | 3:18 |
| 6. | "Brother Song" | 3:19 |
| 7. | "Water Biscuits" | 3:48 |
| 8. | "E.I.B. Negative" | 3:26 |
| 9. | "Haunted Town" | 4:23 |
| 10. | "Floater" | 2:38 |
| 11. | "Cadaver Dogs" | 3:53 |
| 12. | "New Day" | 3:18 |
| Total length: | | 42:36 |

== Personnel ==
- Chris Mars – Drums, Vocals, Guitar, Producer, Engineer, Mixed By, Arranged By, Illustration
- Chuck Whitney – Lead Guitar (tracks 7-9)
- Doug DeGrood – Trumpet on "New Day"
- Tim Mack – Mastering
