= 75% Less Fat =

Studio album by Chris Mars
- Released: 1993
- Recorded: 1992
- Studio: Paisley Park
- Genre: Power pop
- Length: 40:13
- Label: Smash/Island
- Producer: Chris Mars

Chris Mars chronology
Horseshoes and Hand Grenades (1992)	75% Less Fat (1993)	Tenterhooks (1995)

Professional ratings
Review scores
Source	Rating
AllMusic	3/5 stars
Robert Christgau	(dud)
Deseret News	3/4 stars
The Encyclopedia of Popular Music	3/5 stars
Entertainment Weekly	D
MusicHound Rock: The Essential Album Guide	3/5 stars
Orlando Sentinel	4/4 stars

75% Less Fat is the second solo album by former Replacements drummer Chris Mars. The title refers to the rejection of his former bandmates in the Replacements.

== Production ==
Mars wrote all the songs & played almost all the instruments on the album. J.D. Foster, who guested on Mars' previous album Horseshoes and Hand Grenades, plays bass guitar & clarinet. All the cover art was painted by Mars, with his wife, Sally, serving as art director.

== Critical reception ==
While Knight Ridder's Steve Knopper found strong evidence that Mars "was the backbone of his famous former band, the Replacements," for the most part, 75% Less Fat garnered lukewarm reviews. Stephen Thomas Erlewine of AllMusic wrote: "Mars' songs might be a little inconsistent, but the album has an endearing, ragged charm that makes it hard to dislike." Trouser Press wrote that the album "may not push the envelope, but it cements an image of Mars as a serious musician with his own vision."

Deseret News critic Jeff Vice noted that there was no sniping at Paul Westerberg this time around, which made the record more likeable, albeit less memorable than Horseshoes and Hand Grenades. Robert Baird of the Phoenix New Times called it "a well-played, well-produced recording that in the end fails to make any lasting impression. The songs suffer from a certain sameness."

Entertainment Weekly's Lorraine Ali gave the album a D grade, calling the music "beer-commercial-like riffs and bouncy, generic rhythms that, at best, sound like cheap imitations of [Mars's] own musical past."

== Track listing ==
All tracks are written by Chris Mars.

No.	Title	Length
1.	"Stuck in Rewind"	4:00
2.	"No Bands"	2:54
3.	"Weasel"	2:56
4.	"Public Opinion"	2:22
5.	"All Figured Out"	3:41
6.	"Whining Horse"	3:02
7.	"Car Camping"	3:00
8.	"Skipping School"	3:06
9.	"Bullshit Detector"	2:39
10.	"Candy Liquor"	3:04
11.	"Demolition"	3:32
12.	"No More Mud"	2:51
13.	"Nightcap"	3:06
Total length:		40:13
