= Stink (EP) =

1982 EP by the Replacements

EP by the Replacements
- Released: June 24, 1982
- Recorded: March 13, 1982
- Studios: Blackberry Way, Minneapolis, Minnesota
- Genre: Hardcore punk
- Length: 14:24
- Label: Twin/Tone (8228)
- Producers: Steven Fjelstad, Peter Jesperson, the Replacements

The Replacements chronology
Sorry Ma, Forgot to Take Out the Trash (1981)	Stink (1982)	Hootenanny (1983)

Professional ratings
Review scores
Source	Rating
AllMusic	3.5/5 stars
Robert Christgau	A−
Pitchfork Media	7.0/10

Stink (subtitled "Kids Don't Follow" Plus Seven) is an EP by the band the Replacements. It was recorded at Blackberry Way Studio in Minneapolis, Minnesota, on March 13, 1982, and released on June 24, 1982.

Before the first track, "Kids Don't Follow", audio can be heard of the Minneapolis police breaking up a rent party at The Harmony Building in Minneapolis on January 29, 1982. It is possible by listening carefully to hear one of the audience members curse the police. The audience member in question is believed to be Dave Pirner of Soul Asylum.

The EP was remastered and reissued by Rhino Entertainment on April 22, 2008, with four additional tracks and liner notes by Peter Jesperson. "You're Getting Married" is a solo recording by Paul Westerberg, recorded on a boombox in the basement of his parents' house in South Minneapolis.

== Track listing ==
Side 1
No.	Title	Writer(s)	Length
1.	"Kids Don't Follow"	Paul Westerberg	2:18
2.	"Fuck School"	Westerberg, Bob Stinson, Tommy Stinson, Chris Mars	1:25
3.	"Stuck in the Middle"	Westerberg, T. Stinson, B. Stinson, Mars	1:46
4.	"God Damn Job"	Westerberg	1:15

Side 2
No.	Title	Writer(s)	Length
1.	"White and Lazy"	Westerberg	2:06
2.	"Dope Smokin' Moron"	Westerberg, T. Stinson, B. Stinson, Mars	1:31
3.	"Go"	Westerberg	2:28
4.	"Gimme Noise"	Westerberg, T. Stinson, B. Stinson, Mars	1:35
Total length:			14:24

Rhino reissue bonus tracks
No.	Title	Writer(s)	Length
9.	"Staples in Her Stomach" (Outtake)	Westerberg, T. Stinson, B. Stinson, Mars	1:28
10.	"Hey, Good Lookin'" (Outtake)	Hank Williams	1:55
11.	"(We're Gonna) Rock Around the Clock" (Bill Haley & His Comets cover outtake)	Max C. Freedman, James E. Myers	3:02
12.	"You're Getting Married" (Solo home demo)	Westerberg	4:41
Total length:			25:30

== Personnel ==
The Replacements

- Paul Westerberg – vocals, rhythm guitar, harmonica
- Bob Stinson – lead guitar
- Tommy Stinson – bass guitar
- Chris Mars – drums

Technical

- Peter Jesperson – producer, mixer
- Steven Fjelstad – producer, engineer
- Erik Hanson – photography
- Bruce Allen – artwork
