= Horseshoes and Hand Grenades (Chris Mars album) =

Studio album by Chris Mars
- Released: April 7, 1992
- Studio: Paisley Park
- Genres: Alternative rock; power pop
- Length: 47:37
- Label: Smash
- Producers: Chris Mars & Tom Herbers

Chris Mars chronology
Horseshoes and Hand Grenades (1992)	75% Less Fat (1993)

Professional ratings
Review scores
Source	Rating
AllMusic	4.5/5 stars
Chicago Tribune	3.5/4 stars
MusicHound Rock	3.5/4 stars

Horseshoes and Hand Grenades is the debut solo album by former Replacements drummer Chris Mars. It was recorded at Prince's Paisley Park studio in Chanhassen, Minnesota, and released on April 7, 1992 on PolyGram Label Group affiliate Smash Records.

== Recording ==
Whereas All Shook Down is technically the Replacements' final album, Paul Westerberg originally intended for it to be his solo debut, and much of the drumming on the album is by studio musicians. When it was decided that All Shook Down would instead be a Replacements album, Mars brought in a cassette tape of his own material that he recorded on a four-track. When Westerberg dismissed his songs out of hand, Mars decided it was time for him to leave the band altogether.

Horseshoes and Hand Grenades was the result of Mars being 'constipated' in the Replacements. Mars wrote all the songs & played almost all the instruments on the album. J.D. Foster plays the bass guitar.

== Critical reception ==
Despite Mars' lack of singing ability, many critics agreed that Horseshoes and Hand Grenades was the best of the early solo efforts following the Replacements' breakup. Devorah Ostrov of American Music Press called the LP "a confident piece of work, filled to the brim with quintessential Midwestern pop sensibilities." According to AllMusic's Tom Hallett, "Mars nailed the angst & sullen energy of the early 'Mats best with his debut solo album Horseshoes and Hand Grenades.

Not all agreed, however. The Daily Union staff writer Aaron Rohrer called it one of the most disappointing albums of 1992.

== Songs ==
The track "Ego Maniac" takes a jab at Westerberg's dictatorial style as frontman of the Replacements (Move aside you mice, let the king go up the ladder/Charity is a vice, I'm the only one that matters). "Popular Creeps" denounces snooty high school cliques (Popular Creeps are talking bad about us when our back's turned/They better leave us loners alone/Popular Creeps are riding high until the day they get burned/Who's gonna love 'em when they're unknown?). "Better Days" is about being sick from school and experiencing hallucinations from tainted cold medicine.

Dan Murphy & David Pirner from Soul Asylum guest on "Monkey Sees," "Before It Began," & "City Lights on Mars."

== Track listing ==
All tracks are written by Chris Mars.

No.	Title	Length
1.	"Reverse Status"	3:12
2.	"Popular Creeps"	3:04
3.	"Outer Limits"	3:17
4.	"Before it Began"	3:51
5.	"Get Out of My Life"	3:17
6.	"Monkey Sees"	3:55
7.	"Ego Maniac"	2:34
8.	"Midnight Carnival"	4:17
9.	"I, Me, We, Us, Them"	3:43
10.	"Don't You See It"	3:51
11.	"Happy Disconnections"	3:11
12.	"Better Days"	3:03
13.	"City Lights on Mars"	2:49
14.	"Last Drop"	3:33
Total length:		47:37

== Personnel ==
- Chris Mars - vocals, acoustic & electric guitars, keyboards, drums, percussion
- Dan Murphy - lead guitar on track 13, backing vocals
- J.D. Foster - bass
- David Pirner - trumpet on track 6, backing vocals
