= Hootenanny (The Replacements album) =

1983 album by the Replacements

Studio album by the Replacements
- Released: April 29, 1983
- Recorded: October 1982 – January 1983
- Studios: Stark/Mudge Mobile Unit warehouse, Brooklyn Center, Minnesota
- Genres: Alternative rock; punk rock; college rock
- Length: 31:06
- Label: Twin/Tone
- Producers: Paul Stark, Peter Jesperson, the Replacements

The Replacements chronology
Stink (1982)	Hootenanny (1983)	Let It Be (1984)

Singles from Hootenanny
- 1. "Color Me Impressed" Released: 1983

Hootenanny is the second studio album by the American rock band the Replacements, released on April 29, 1983, by Twin/Tone Records. The album received positive reviews from critics.

== Recording and release ==
Hootenanny was mostly recorded from October 1982 to January 1983 at the Stark/Mudge Mobile Unit warehouse in Brooklyn Center, Minnesota, which was described in the liner notes as "a warehouse in some godawful suburb north of Mpls". The tracks "Run It" and "Within Your Reach" were recorded at Blackberry Way, while the song "Treatment Bound" was recorded "in the basement". The album was released on April 29, 1983, by Twin/Tone Records. According to the record label, Hootenanny sold more than 38,000 vinyl copies. In 2008, The album was remastered and reissued by Rhino Entertainment, containing seven additional tracks and liner notes by Peter Jesperson. The album's cover art, created by fellow Minneapolis musician and Hüsker Dü drummer, Grant Hart, under the alias of "Fake Name Graphx", is based on the 1963 Crestview Records compilation album The Original Hootenanny. Westerberg described the cover as, "Our first blatant theft. We were dumb enough to think that if we pretended nothing ever came before us, we could fool people into thinking it all started with us."

== Music and lyrics ==
Hootenanny is often regarded as the first release on which the Replacements began to branch out from the "breakneck punk" that characterized their earlier work, through the incorporation of various genres such as blues, country, rockabilly, and boogie. The opening track "Hootenanny" features a rearranged lineup of Chris Mars on lead guitar, Tommy Stinson on rhythm guitar, Bob Stinson on bass guitar, and Paul Westerberg on drums and vocals, while "Within Your Reach" features Westerberg on all instruments and vocals. The lyrics for the song "Lovelines" were largely taken verbatim from the classifieds section of an issue of City Pages, a Minneapolis newspaper. The surf-instrumental "Buck Hill" takes its name from a small skiing area in Burnsville, Minnesota, just a few miles south of Minneapolis. "Mr. Whirly" is a parody of the Beatles song "Oh! Darling" (with the opening bars of "Strawberry Fields Forever") and bears the writing credit "mostly stolen" on the record label.

== Critical reception ==
Professional ratings
Review scores
Source	Rating
AllMusic	4.5/5 stars
NME	7/10
Pitchfork	7.9/10
Q	4/5 stars
Record Collector	4/5 stars
Rolling Stone	4/5 stars
The Rolling Stone Album Guide	4/5 stars
Spin	4/5 stars
Spin Alternative Record Guide	7/10
The Village Voice	B+

Hootenanny received positive reviews from critics. Jon Young, in a 1983 Trouser Press review, said that the Replacements play "with all the delicacy of a garbage compactor," and that "their joyful noise may shock you, but it'll add excitement to your life." The album was ranked number 30 in The Village Voice's 1983 Pazz & Jop critics' poll. In a retrospective review, Noel Murray of The A.V. Club felt that Hootenanny "brims with personality, and though The Replacements' real masterpieces were ahead of them, their second LP was a deck-clearer that gave Westerberg the confidence to mature. It's just too bad that he never again made an album this straight-up fun."

== Track listing ==
All tracks are written by Paul Westerberg, except where noted.

Side 1
No.	Title	Writer(s)	Length
1.	"Hootenanny"	Westerberg, Tommy Stinson, Bob Stinson, Chris Mars	1:52
2.	"Run It"	Westerberg, Mars	1:11
3.	"Color Me Impressed"		2:25
4.	"Willpower"		4:22
5.	"Take Me Down to the Hospital"		3:47
6.	"Mr. Whirly"	"mostly stolen"	1:53

Side 2
No.	Title	Writer(s)	Length
7.	"Within Your Reach"		4:24
8.	"Buck Hill"	Westerberg, T. Stinson, Mars	2:09
9.	"Lovelines"	Westerberg, T, Stinson, B. Stinson, Mars, "C.P. Readers"	2:01
10.	"You Lose"	Westerberg, T, Stinson, B. Stinson, Mars	1:41
11.	"Hayday"		2:06
12.	"Treatment Bound"		3:16
Total length:			31:06

Deluxe Edition bonus tracks
No.	Title	Length
13.	"Lookin' for Ya" (from the KQDS talent search contest compilation Trackin' Up the North)	1:57
14.	"Junior's Got a Gun" (Outtake - Rough Mix)	2:08
15.	"Ain't No Crime" (Outtake)	1:15
16.	"Johnny Fast" (Outtake - Rough Mix)	2:28
17.	"Treatment Bound" (Alternate Version)	3:15
18.	"Lovelines" (Alternate Vocal)	2:05
19.	"Bad Worker" (Solo Home Demo)	4:14
Total length:		47:28

- "Within Your Reach" appeared on the soundtrack of the 1989 Cameron Crowe film Say Anything... on the recommendation of star John Cusack. It also appeared on the soundtrack of The Bear season 3 finale, "Forever."

== Personnel ==
The Replacements

- Paul Westerberg – rhythm guitar, vocals (drums on track 1, all instruments on track 7)
- Bob Stinson – lead guitar (bass on track 1)
- Tommy Stinson – bass (rhythm guitar on track 1)
- Chris Mars – drums (lead guitar on track 1)
