= Static Taxi =

- Origin: Minneapolis-Saint Paul
- Genres: post-punk, independent rock, rock and roll
- Years active: 1988–1991
- Past members: Bob Stinson, Ray Reigstad, John Reipas, Chris Corbett

Static Taxi was a post-punk band formed in the late 1980s, later joined by Bob Stinson, former lead guitarist of The Replacements. They were so-called because two members of the band worked part-time as taxi drivers.

Two years after leaving the Replacements, Stinson joined Static Taxi in the summer of 1988 with two younger friends, drummer John Reipas and bassist/vocalist Ray Reigstad. Stinson had been jamming informally with Riegstad and Reipas for a couple of years previously, playing cover versions of 1970s pop songs, even while he was still a member of the Replacements. They became a quartet when they recruited bass player Chris Corbett.

The band rehearsed tirelessly over the next few years, and developed an extensive catalog of original songs and cover versions. Their headquarters was the office of an abandoned grain elevator near the University of Minnesota campus in southeast Minneapolis. Later, they moved to one of several boxcars which the owner of the grain elevator kept on a railroad siding behind his property and rented out to various artists and musicians. The grain elevator was home to a number of homeless veterans, including one named "Hillbilly" who sang the lead on the band's recording of their song "Hillbilly's Lament."

Static Taxi recorded a large amount of material, some of it on professional studio equipment, and at some point, Stinson brought some demo tapes to the Replacements' old label Twin/Tone. The label refused to sign the band, reportedly because they thought Reigstad's singing was off-key. Aside from a brief trip to Las Vegas in 1989, the band's live shows were limited to the local Twin Cities area. Videos of just two of their live shows have surfaced on video-sharing sites such as YouTube: a 1989 show in Las Vegas where they are performing before a small but enthusiastic crowd at a little club, and a 1990 performance where they entertained the employees of a local Twin Cities restaurant at its annual staff party.

The band broke up in 1991, around the same time the Replacements broke up.

Stinson died in 1995. Vocalist Ray Reigstad went on to form the band Stepchild.

Two albums have been posthumously compiled from the band's recordings. In 2000, "Stinson Blvd" was released on Rock X-Change Records. In 2003 Birdman Records released "Closer2Normal."
