= Tim (The Replacements album) =

1985 album by the Replacements

Studio album by The Replacements
- Released: September 18, 1985
- Recorded: June–July 1985
- Studios: Nicollet Studios (Minneapolis, Minnesota)
- Genres: Alternative rock; punk rock; power pop
- Length: 36:26
- Label: Sire
- Producer: Tommy Erdelyi

The Replacements chronology
Let It Be (1984)	Tim (1985)	The Shit Hits the Fans (1985)

Singles from Tim
- 1. "Bastards of Young" Released: 1985; 2. "Kiss Me on the Bus" Released: 1985

Tim is the fourth studio album by American alternative rock band The Replacements. It was released in September 1985 on Sire Records. Tim was their first major label release. It was also the last album made by the original line-up of the band, as guitarist Bob Stinson was kicked out of the band towards the end of 1986.

Like its predecessors, Tim achieved moderate mainstream commercial success despite critical acclaim. The album peaked at number 183 on the Billboard Top 200. It was placed 136th on Rolling Stone's 2003 list of the 500 greatest albums of all time, and 137 in a 2012 revised list. It ranked 4th in the Alternative Press list of the Top 99 albums of 1985–1995. Along with the band's previous album, Let It Be, Tim received five stars from AllMusic. In 2014, the staff of PopMatters included the album on their list of "12 Essential Alternative Rock Albums from the 1980s".

Tim was produced by Tommy Erdelyi, best known as original Ramones drummer Tommy Ramone.

== Songs ==
Stylistically, the album shows Paul Westerberg's diverse influences, including Alex Chilton's Big Star on "Hold My Life," Roy Orbison and Duane Eddy on "Swingin Party" and Nick Lowe on "Kiss Me on the Bus." The song "Can't Hardly Wait" was originally recorded for Tim, but was not included in the release. It appears later on Pleased to Meet Me with one of the original guitar parts changed to a horn part.

The album also contains the song "Bastards of Young," which was given a now-famous black-and-white video, consisting mostly of a single unbroken shot of a speaker. At the end of the song, the speaker is kicked in by the person who was listening to the song. Similar videos were also made for "Hold My Life" (in color), "Left of the Dial" (minus the speaker-bashing), and "Little Mascara" (also in color).

"Left of the Dial" is a reference to college radio stations, which were usually on the left side of a radio dial. Over 40 years after the album's release, the song remains popular as a college radio anthem and was ranked 265 on Rolling Stone's 500 Greatest Songs of All Time in 2021; it was ranked 24th in Rolling Stone's 2023 list of "The 200 best songs of the 1980s".

The band performed "Bastards of Young" and "Kiss Me on the Bus" on Saturday Night Live on January 18, 1986. It was the most television exposure the band had received up to that time, but the band's behavior on the show, including swearing during the broadcast, resulted in a lifetime ban from Saturday Night Live. However, Westerberg would later perform on the show as a solo artist.

The song "Here Comes a Regular" was written about south Minneapolis bar CC Club, a frequent hangout for the band across the street from record store Oar Folkjokeopus, an important center for the Minneapolis music scene.

== Packaging ==
Bob Stinson is the only member of the band whose face is clearly visible on the cover. Westerberg said, "The cover is the worst piece of shit. [The label] hired Robert Longo: World Famous Artist. Nobody liked it—I can’t believe that Robert liked it."

The name of the album was chosen by Westerberg on a whim, according to Peter Jesperson: "I clearly remember Paul [Westerberg] saying one day, 'I think we should call the album Tim. I said, 'Why?' And he said, 'Because it's such a nice name.' So, as far as I know, the title Tim had nothing to do with [A&R executive] Tim Carr. I think Paul just pulled it out of thin air. But the only person who really knows is Paul."

== Reissues ==
The album was first remastered and reissued by Rhino Entertainment on September 23, 2008, with six additional tracks and liner notes by Peter Jesperson.

Cover for Tim: Let It Bleed Edition

Rhino reissued the album again as Tim: Let It Bleed Edition, on September 22, 2023. The four-disc re-release includes a new mix by Ed Stasium, alternate takes, demos, a live performance at the Cabaret Metro recorded in 1986, and liner notes by Bob Mehr. In total, the box-set includes 65 tracks, 50 of which have never been heard before.

== Reception ==
Retrospective professional ratings
Review scores
Source	Rating
AllMusic	5/5 stars
Blender	5/5 stars
Christgau's Record Guide	A−
Entertainment Weekly	A
Mojo	4/5 stars
Pitchfork	8.7/10 (2008); 10/10 (2023)
Q	4/5 stars
Rolling Stone	4.5/5 stars
The Rolling Stone Album Guide	4.5/5 stars
Spin Alternative Record Guide	9/10

Like its predecessor, Let It Be, Tim was highly praised by critics upon its release. The album is frequently included on professional lists of the all-time best rock albums. Tim was ranked at number four in Alternative Press' list of the Top 99 albums of 1985–1995. Along with their previous album, Let It Be, Tim received five stars from AllMusic.

The album was placed 136th on Rolling Stone's 2003 list of the 500 greatest albums of all time, with the following review:

Singer-guitarist Paul Westerberg once cited Tim's stylistic bookends to describe both the longevity of the Replacements' influence and their lack of mainstream success. "My style is ultimately both kinds of things," he said. "Sometimes you just love the little acoustic songs, and other times you want to crank the goddamn amp up, and those two parts of me are forever entwined." That cognitive dissonance – the Stonesesque swagger of "Bastards of Young," the unpolished reflection in "Swingin Party" — became a crucial template for grunge, alternative country and, recently, the noisy introspection of emo.

Pitchfork ranked Tim at number 37 on their list of the Top 100 Albums of the 1980s. Slant Magazine listed the album at number 66 on its list of "Best Albums of the 1980s".

Reviewing the 2023 Tim: Let It Bleed re-release, Jack Hamilton of Slate called the original album one of the most poorly-mixed of the 1980s, praising Ed Stasium's remix as "a watershed, the rare act of musical revision that refreshes its object in ways that should thrill diehard fans while also serving as a gorgeous welcome 'Mat for listeners experiencing this music for the first time". Jeremy D. Larson of Pitchfork gave the re-release a 10 out of 10 and called it an "unbelievable new remix of Tim that doesn’t just challenge the notion that Let It Be was the Replacements at their peak, but usurps it to become the best and most definitive album in their catalog".

== Track listing ==
All tracks are written by Paul Westerberg, except where noted.

Side one
No.	Title	Writer(s)	Length
1.	"Hold My Life"		4:18
2.	"I'll Buy"		3:20
3.	"Kiss Me on the Bus"		2:48
4.	"Dose of Thunder"	Chris Mars; Tommy Stinson; Westerberg	2:16
5.	"Waitress in the Sky"		2:02
6.	"Swingin Party"		3:48

Side two
No.	Title	Length
1.	"Bastards of Young"	3:35
2.	"Lay It Down Clown"	2:22
3.	"Left of the Dial"	3:41
4.	"Little Mascara"	3:33
5.	"Here Comes a Regular"	4:46

2008 CD reissue bonus tracks
No.	Title	Writer(s)	Length
12.	"Can't Hardly Wait" (Acoustic Outtake)		3:52
13.	"Nowhere Is My Home" (Session Outtake)		4:01
14.	"Can't Hardly Wait" (Electric Outtake)		3:09
15.	"Kiss Me on the Bus" (Demo Version)		3:00
16.	"Waitress in the Sky" (Alternate Version)	Mars; T. Stinson; Westerberg	2:00
17.	"Here Comes a Regular" (Alternate Version)		5:22
Total length:			58:46

- Tracks 12 and 14–17 were previously unreleased.
- Tracks 12–14 are session outtakes with Alex Chilton as producer.

=== Tim: Let It Bleed Edition (2023 4 disc reissue) ===
Disc One
No.	Title	Writer(s)	Length
1.	"Hold My Life" (Ed Stasium mix)		4:21
2.	"I'll Buy" (Ed Stasium mix)		3:22
3.	"Kiss Me on the Bus" (Ed Stasium mix)		2:56
4.	"Dose of Thunder" (Ed Stasium mix)	Mars; T. Stinson; Westerberg	2:19
5.	"Waitress in the Sky" (Ed Stasium mix)		2:07
6.	"Swingin Party" (Ed Stasium mix)		3:50
7.	"Bastards of Young" (Ed Stasium mix)		3:37
8.	"Lay It Down Clown" (Ed Stasium mix)		2:23
9.	"Left of the Dial" (Ed Stasium mix)		3:42
10.	"Little Mascara" (Ed Stasium mix)		4:28
11.	"Here Comes a Regular" (Ed Stasium mix)		4:56

Disc Two
No.	Title	Writer(s)	Length
1.	"Hold My Life" (2023 Remaster)		4:20
2.	"I'll Buy" (2023 Remaster)		3:23
3.	"Kiss Me on the Bus" (2023 Remaster)		2:54
4.	"Dose of Thunder" (2023 Remaster)	Mars; T. Stinson; Westerberg	2:17
5.	"Waitress in the Sky" (2023 Remaster)		2:01
6.	"Swingin Party" (2023 Remaster)		3:50
7.	"Bastards of Young" (2023 Remaster)		3:37
8.	"Lay It Down Clown" (2023 Remaster)		2:24
9.	"Left of the Dial" (2023 Remaster)		3:43
10.	"Little Mascara" (2023 Remaster)		3:35
11.	"Here Comes a Regular" (2023 Remaster)		4:46

Disc Three
No.	Title	Writer(s)	Length
1.	"Can't Hardly Wait" (Acoustic Demo)		3:51
2.	"Nowhere Is My Home" (Alernate mix)		4:01
3.	"Can't Hardly Wait" (Electric Demo - Alternate mix)		3:09
4.	"Left of the Dial" (Alternate Version)		3:57
5.	"Nowhere Is My Home" (Alternate Version)		4:23
6.	"Can't Hardly Wait" (Cello Version)		3:06
7.	"Kiss Me on the Bus" (Studio Demo)		2:59
8.	"Little Mascara" (Studio Demo)		4:01
9.	"Bastards of Young" (Alternate Version)		3:40
10.	"Hold My Life" (Alternate Version)		4:23
11.	"Having Fun"		2:56
12.	"Waitress in the Sky" (Alternate Version)	Mars; T. Stinson; Westerberg	2:00
13.	"Can't Hardly Wait" (The "Tim" Version - Alternate mix)		3:09
14.	"Swingin Party" (Alternate Version)		3:51
15.	"Here Comes a Regular" (Alternate Version)		4:31

Disc Four - Live at the Cabaret Metro
No.	Title	Writer(s)	Length
1.	"Gary's Got a Boner" (Live at the Cabaret Metro, Chicago, IL, 1/11/86)	B. Stinson; Mars; Westerberg; Ted Nugent; T. Stinson	1:56
2.	"Love You Till Friday" (Live at the Cabaret Metro, Chicago, IL, 1/11/86)		2:09
3.	"Bastards of Young" (Live at the Cabaret Metro, Chicago, IL, 1/11/86)		3:15
4.	"Can't Hardly Wait" (Live at the Cabaret Metro, Chicago, IL, 1/11/86)		3:04
5.	"Answering Machine" (Live at the Cabaret Metro, Chicago, IL, 1/11/86)		3:00
6.	"Little Mascara" (Live at the Cabaret Metro, Chicago, IL, 1/11/86)		3:24
7.	"Color Me Impressed" (Live at the Cabaret Metro, Chicago, IL, 1/11/86)		2:38
8.	"Kiss Me on the Bus" (Live at the Cabaret Metro, Chicago, IL, 1/11/86)		3:11
9.	"Favorite Thing" (Live at the Cabaret Metro, Chicago, IL, 1/11/86)	Westerberg; T. Stinson; B. Stinson; Mars	2:26
10.	"Mr. Whirly" (Live at the Cabaret Metro, Chicago, IL, 1/11/86)		1:47
11.	"Tommy Gets His Tonsils Out" (Live at the Cabaret Metro, Chicago, IL, 1/11/86)	Westerberg; T. Stinson; B. Stinson; Mars	2:02
12.	"I Will Dare" (Live at the Cabaret Metro, Chicago, IL, 1/11/86)		3:22
13.	"Johnny's Gonna Die" (Live at the Cabaret Metro, Chicago, IL, 1/11/86)		3:46
14.	"Dose of Thunder" (Live at the Cabaret Metro, Chicago, IL, 1/11/86)	Mars; T. Stinson; Westerberg	2:30
15.	"Takin a Ride" (Live at the Cabaret Metro, Chicago, IL, 1/11/86)		2:28
16.	"Hitchin' a Ride" (Live at the Cabaret Metro, Chicago, IL, 1/11/86)	Mitch Murray & Peter Callander	2:11
17.	"Trouble Boys" (Live at the Cabaret Metro, Chicago, IL, 1/11/86)	Billy Bremner (listed as Billy Murray)	2:11
18.	"Unsatisfied" (Live at the Cabaret Metro, Chicago, IL, 1/11/86)		2:35
19.	"Black Diamond" (Live at the Cabaret Metro, Chicago, IL, 1/11/86)	Paul Stanley	2:49
20.	"Jumpin' Jack Flash" (Live at the Cabaret Metro, Chicago, IL, 1/11/86)	Jagger/Richards	4:03
21.	"Customer" (Live at the Cabaret Metro, Chicago, IL, 1/11/86)		1:33
22.	"Borstal Breakout" (Live at the Cabaret Metro, Chicago, IL, 1/11/86)	Dave Parsons & Jimmy Pursey	2:01
23.	"Take Me Down to the Hospital" (Live at the Cabaret Metro, Chicago, IL, 1/11/86)		3:22
24.	"Kids Don't Follow" (Live at the Cabaret Metro, Chicago, IL, 1/11/86)		2:44
25.	"Nowhere Man" (Live at the Cabaret Metro, Chicago, IL, 1/11/86)	Lennon/McCartney	2:15
26.	"The Crusher" (Live at the Cabaret Metro, Chicago, IL, 1/11/86)	Bob Nolan	1:29
27.	"I'm in Trouble" (Live at the Cabaret Metro, Chicago, IL, 1/11/86)		2:31
28.	"Go" (Live at the Cabaret Metro, Chicago, IL, 1/11/86)		3:02
Total length:			3:18:50

== Personnel ==
The Replacements

- Paul Westerberg – vocals, guitar, piano
- Chris Mars – drums, backing vocals
- Bob Stinson – guitar
- Tommy Stinson – bass

with:

- Alex Chilton – additional production, vocals on "Left of the Dial"
- Tommy Erdelyi – producer, guitar solo on "Kiss Me on the Bus"

Technical:

- Steven Fjelstad – producer, engineer
- Jack Skinner – mastering
- Robert Longo – artwork
- Ed Stasium – mixer (2023 reissue)
- Bob Mehr – liner notes (2023 reissue)
