= Sorry Ma, Forgot to Take Out the Trash =

1981 album by the Replacements

Studio album by the Replacements
- Released: August 25, 1981
- Recorded: July 1980, March–June 1981
- Genres: Punk rock; hardcore punk
- Length: 36:47
- Label: Twin/Tone
- Producers: Paul Westerberg, Peter Jesperson, Steven Fjelstad

The Replacements chronology
Sorry Ma, Forgot to Take Out the Trash (1981)	Stink (1982)

Sorry Ma, Forgot to Take Out the Trash is the debut studio album by the American band the Replacements. It was released on August 25, 1981, by Twin/Tone Records. Squarely inspired by punk rock, the album stands in contrast to the power pop and indie rock styles of later albums.

== Music and lyrics ==
The beginning of Johnny Cash's "Folsom Prison Blues" can be heard at the beginning of the track "Rattlesnake".

The track "Somethin' to Dü" is a reference to the band Hüsker Dü, contemporaries of the Replacements and their Saint Paul counterparts. The track "Johnny's Gonna Die" is a reference to guitarist Johnny Thunders of the Heartbreakers and New York Dolls, specifically his heroin addiction. Thunders died in 1991.

== Release ==
Sorry Ma, Forgot to Take Out the Trash was released on August 25, 1981 by the independent record label Twin/Tone Records. Before settling on a title for the album, Westerberg considered the names Unsuitable for Airplay and Power Trash.

The song "I'm In Trouble" was released as a single on August 7, 1981, containing, "If Only You Were Lonely", as its B-side. The album was remastered and reissued by Rhino Entertainment on April 22, 2008, with 13 additional tracks and liner notes by Peter Jesperson.

To celebrate its 40th anniversary, on October 22, 2021, Rhino Entertainment released a deluxe edition of the newly remastered album. Featuring 100 tracks spread across 4CDs and 1LP, it includes unreleased demos, alternative takes/mixes, and a previously unreleased 27-track live concert recorded on January 23, 1981 at 7th Street Entry in Minneapolis.

== Critical reception ==
Professional ratings
Review scores
Source	Rating
AllMusic	4.5/5 stars
Pitchfork Media	9.4/10
Punknews.org	5/5 stars
The Village Voice	B+

In a 1982 Trouser Press review, Robert Payes described the "I'm in Trouble" single, which was taken from the album, as "(p)ower pop with the emphasis on power, roaring guitars and energy galore." In The Boston Phoenix, Milo Miles said that "One of the gratifying twists of Sorry, Ma, Forgot To Take Out the Trash is that the Replacements are uninterested in (though not unaware of) adolescence and garage rock as pervasive, self-referential pop mythologies."

Retrospectively, AllMusic reviewer Stephen Thomas Erlewine considered Sorry Ma, Forgot to Take Out the Trash to be "one of the best LPs the entire scene produced in the early '80s." In a very positive review, Punknews.org praised the album for being different from its counterparts of the hardcore punk scene, stating that the album "never sacrificed its pop appeal for throat-searing screams and whiplash speed."

== Track listing ==
All tracks are written by Paul Westerberg, except where noted.

Side 1
No.	Title	Writer(s)	Length
1.	"Takin' a Ride"		2:23
2.	"Careless"		1:08
3.	"Customer"		1:29
4.	"Hangin' Downtown"		2:06
5.	"Kick Your Door Down"		3:11
6.	"Otto"		2:09
7.	"I Bought a Headache"		2:24
8.	"Rattlesnake"	Westerberg, Bob Stinson, Tommy Stinson, Chris Mars	1:48
9.	"I Hate Music"	Westerberg, B. Stinson, T. Stinson, Mars	1:50

Side 2
No.	Title	Length
10.	"Johnny's Gonna Die"	3:32
11.	"Shiftless When Idle"	2:18
12.	"More Cigarettes"	1:20
13.	"Don't Ask Why"	1:57
14.	"Somethin' to Dü"	1:41
15.	"I'm in Trouble"	2:10
16.	"Love You Till Friday"	1:53
17.	"Shutup"	1:23
18.	"Raised in the City"	1:59
Total length:		36:47

Expanded edition bonus tracks
No.	Title	Writer(s)	Length
19.	"Raised in the City" (Demo)		2:16
20.	"Shutup" (Demo)		1:39
21.	"Don't Turn Me Down" (Demo)		1:54
22.	"Shape Up" (Demo)		2:11
23.	"You Ain't Gotta Dance" (Demo)		2:24
24.	"Get on the Stick" (Demo)		1:39
25.	"Oh Baby" (Demo)		1:18
26.	"Like You"		1:44
27.	"Get Lost"		2:27
28.	"A Toe Needs a Shoe"	B. Stinson	2:09
29.	"Customer" (Alternate take)		2:09
30.	"Basement Jam"	Westerberg, T. Stinson, B. Stinson, Mars	3:32
31.	"If Only You Were Lonely" (B-side of "I'm in Trouble", 1981)		2:53

2021 Remaster, Disc 1
No.	Title	Writer(s)	Length
1.	"Takin' a Ride"		2:23
2.	"Careless"		1:08
3.	"Customer"		1:29
4.	"Hangin' Downtown"		2:06
5.	"Kick Your Door Down"		3:11
6.	"Otto"		2:09
7.	"I Bought a Headache"		2:24
8.	"Rattlesnake"	Westerberg, B. Stinson, T. Stinson, Mars	1:48
9.	"I Hate Music"	Westerberg, B. Stinson, T. Stinson, Mars	1:50
10.	"Johnny's Gonna Die"		3:32
11.	"Shiftless When Idle"		2:18
12.	"More Cigarettes"		1:20
13.	"Don't Ask Why"		1:57
14.	"Somethin' to Dü"		1:41
15.	"I'm in Trouble"		2:10
16.	"Love You Till Friday"		1:53
17.	"Shutup"		1:23
18.	"Raised in the City"		1:59
19.	"If Only You Were Lonely"		2:35

Raised in the City - The Early Recordings, Disc 2
No.	Title	Writer(s)	Length
1.	"Try Me" (Demo)		2:22
2.	"She's Fine" (Demo)		2:33
3.	"Lookin For Ya" (Demo)		2:19
4.	"Raised in The City" (Demo)		2:16
5.	"Shutup" (Demo)		1:37
6.	"Don't Turn Me Down" (Demo)		1:57
7.	"Shape Up" (Demo)		2:12
8.	"I Hate Music" (Demo)	Westerberg, B. Stinson, T. Stinson, Mars	2:02
9.	"Careless" (Studio Demo)		1:20
10.	"Shutup" (Studio Demo)		1:31
11.	"Otto" (Studio Demo)		2:08
12.	"Get On The Stick" (Studio Demo)		1:38
13.	"Oh Baby" (Studio Demo)		1:18
14.	"Raised in the City" (Studio Demo)		2:11
15.	"Shiftless When Idle" (Studio Demo)		2:20
16.	"More Cigarettes" (Studio Demo)		1:30
17.	"You Ain't Gotta Dance" (Studio Demo)		2:25
18.	"Don't Turn Me Down" (Studio Demo)		1:55
19.	"Rattlesnake" (Basement Version)	Westerberg, B. Stinson, T. Stinson, Mars	1:54
20.	"Takin A Ride" (Basement Version)		2:33
21.	"Lie About Your Age" (Basement Version)		3:04
22.	"We'll Get Drunk / Customer" (Basement Version)		4:57
23.	"Johnny Fast" (Basement Version)		1:54
24.	"Mistake" (Basement Version)		2:58
25.	"Basement Jam" (Rehearsal)	Westerberg, B. Stinson, T. Stinson, Mars	3:30

Tape's Rolling - Studio Outtakes, Alternates & Home Demos, Disc 3
No.	Title	Writer(s)	Length
1.	"Careless" (Alternate Version)		1:13
2.	"Takin A Ride" (Alternate Version)		2:22
3.	"Shutup" (Alternate Version)		1:30
4.	"Otto" (Alternate Mix)		2:13
5.	"Raised In The City" (Alternate Version)		2:09
6.	"Rattlesnake" (Alternate Mix)	Westerberg, B. Stinson, T. Stinson, Mars	1:57
7.	"Love You Till Friday" (Alternate Version)		2:04
8.	"Customer" (Alternate Version)		1:31
9.	"Somethin To Dü" (Alternate Version)		1:49
10.	"Johnny's Gonna Die" (Alternate Version)		3:16
11.	"I'm In Trouble" (Alternate Version)		2:10
12.	"I Hate Music" (Alternate Version)	Westerberg, B. Stinson, T. Stinson, Mars	1:51
13.	"We'll Get Drunk"		2:31
14.	"More Cigarettes" (Alternate Mix)		1:25
15.	"Get Lost" (Instrumental)		2:27
16.	"Hangin Downtown" (Alternate Version)		2:05
17.	"Shutup" (Alternate Version 2)		1:19
18.	"Somethin To Dü" (Alternate Version 2)		1:36
19.	"Don't Ask Why" (Alternate Version 2)		1:54
20.	"Kick Your Door Down" (Alternate Mix)		3:10
21.	"Love You Till Friday" (Alternate Mix)		2:09
22.	"Johnny's Gonna Die" (Alternate Mix)		3:33
23.	"Like You" (Outtake)		1:44
24.	"Get Lost" (Outtake)		2:26
25.	"A Toe Needs a Shoe" (Outtake)	B. Stinson	2:10
26.	"You're Pretty When You're Rude" (Solo Home Demo)		2:49
27.	"If Only You Were Lonely" (Working Version / Solo Home Demo)		4:18
28.	"Bad Worker" (Solo Home Demo)		3:57
29.	"You're Getting Married" (Solo Home Demo)		4:35

Disc 4, Unsuitable for Airplay - The Lost KFAI Concert (Live at The 7th St Entry, Minneapolis, MN, 1/23/81)
No.	Title	Writer(s)	Length
1.	"Careless"		1:21
2.	"Takin A Ride"		2:29
3.	"Trouble Boys"	Billy Murray	2:36
4.	"Hangin Downtown"		2:35
5.	"Like You"		1:53
6.	"Off Your Pants"		1:43
7.	"Get Lost"		2:39
8.	"Excuse Me"		2:18
9.	"Customer"		2:06
10.	"I Wanna Be Loved"	Johnny Thunders	2:11
11.	"Mistake"		3:52
12.	"My Town"	Jim Lea, Noddy Holder	2:24
13.	"Shiftless When Idle"		1:58
14.	"Oh Baby"		1:53
15.	"I'm In Trouble"		2:33
16.	"Johnny's Gonna Die / All By Myself"	Westerberg, Jerry Nolan, Walter Lure	5:06
17.	"More Cigarettes"		1:49
18.	"Otto"		2:23
19.	"Don't Ask Why"		2:20
20.	"Slow Down"	Larry Williams	2:37
21.	"Somethin to Dü"		2:01
22.	"Love You Till Friday"		2:10
23.	"Raised in the City"		2:12
24.	"Rattlesnake"	Westerberg, B. Stinson, T. Stinson, Mars	2:16
25.	"All Day and All of the Night"	Ray Davies	2:53
26.	"I Hate Music"	Westerberg, B. Stinson, T. Stinson, Mars	1:48
27.	"Shutup"		1:44

== Personnel ==
The Replacements

- Paul Westerberg – vocals, rhythm guitar, producer
- Bob Stinson – lead guitar
- Tommy Stinson – bass guitar
- Chris Mars – drums

Technical

- Peter Jesperson – producer
- Steven Fjelstad – producer, engineer
- Paul Stark – mixer
- Laurie Allen – photography
- Erik Hanson – photography
- Greg Helgeson – artwork
- Pat Moriarity – artwork
- Bruce Allen – artwork
