= Phipps Center for the Arts =

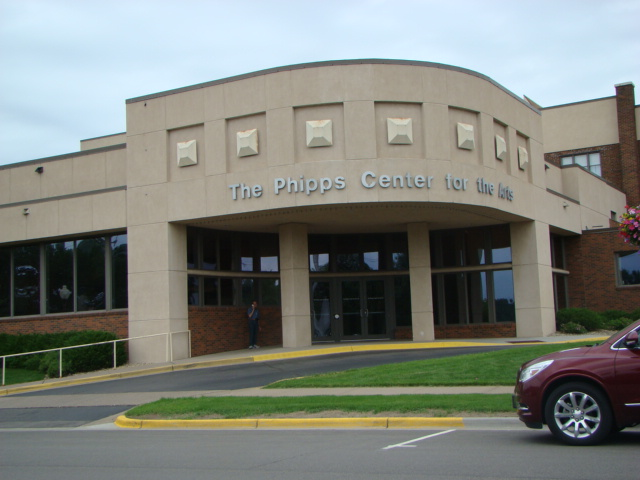
- Main entrance to the Phipps Center
- Address: 109 Locust Street; Hudson, Wisconsin; United States
- Type: Performing arts center

Construction
- Opened: 1983

Website
- thephipps.org

The Phipps Center for the Arts is a theatre and arts center in Hudson, Wisconsin, offering a variety of theatrical, musical, dance, and artistic performances, in addition to art exhibits and arts and dance related classes and lessons. The facility is a non-profit, community-based organization offering cultural and artistic experiences to area residents.

Built in 1983 and expanded in 1992, the Phipps is operated mainly through the help of volunteers. It operates with a $1.2 million annual budget, in a $7 million facility. Its Endowment Fund is over $1 million.

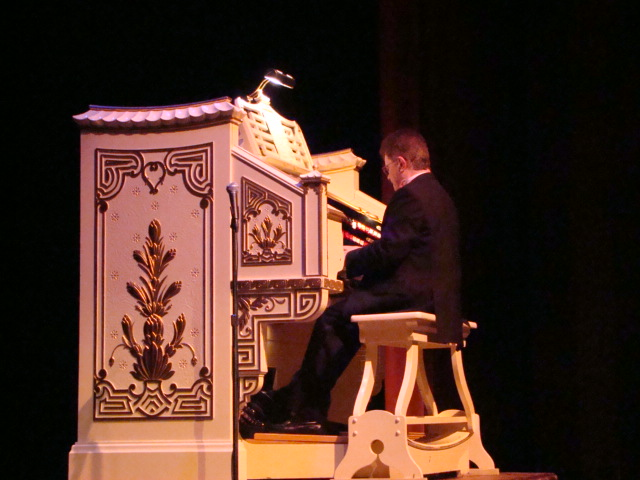
The theatre organ in the auditorium of the Phipps Center

In addition to art exhibit and classroom areas, there are multiple auditoriums. A main feature in the theatre is a Wurlitzer Theatre Organ, used for concerts, and to accompany silent films. This organ was originally installed in the Capitol Theatre in St. Paul in 1926. It was reinstalled in the KSTP Television Studios in Saint Paul in 1957 and then moved to the Phipps Center in 1983. The organ has three manuals, and 16 ranks (sets of pipes).
