= Chris Mars =

American painter and musician

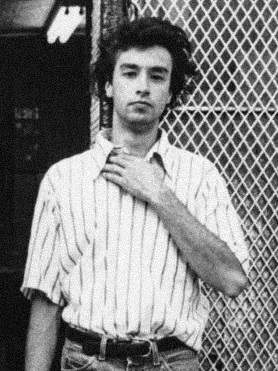
- Chris Mars in 1984

Background information
- Born: Christopher Edward Mars; April 26, 1961 (age 65); Minneapolis, Minnesota
- Genre: Alternative rock
- Occupations: Musician, songwriter, producer, painter
- Instruments: Drums, guitar, keyboards
- Years active: 1979–1996, 2017 (musician); 1996–present (artist)
- Website: chrismarspublishing.com

Christopher Edward Mars (born April 26, 1961) is an American painter and musician. He was the drummer for the seminal Minneapolis-based alternative rock band the Replacements from 1979 to 1990. He later joined the informal supergroup Golden Smog before embarking on a solo career. Although Mars currently focuses mainly on his painting career, he still occasionally releases new music.

== Biography ==
=== Early life ===
Mars is one of seven children. He attended Central High School in Minneapolis but did not graduate. When he was five years old, his eldest brother, Joe, was institutionalized for Schizophrenia.

Mars became interested in music after seeing the Sex Pistols on the cover of a flyer at a local supermarket newsstand. He proceeded to wear out the copy of Never Mind the Bollocks his brother owned.

=== The Replacements ===
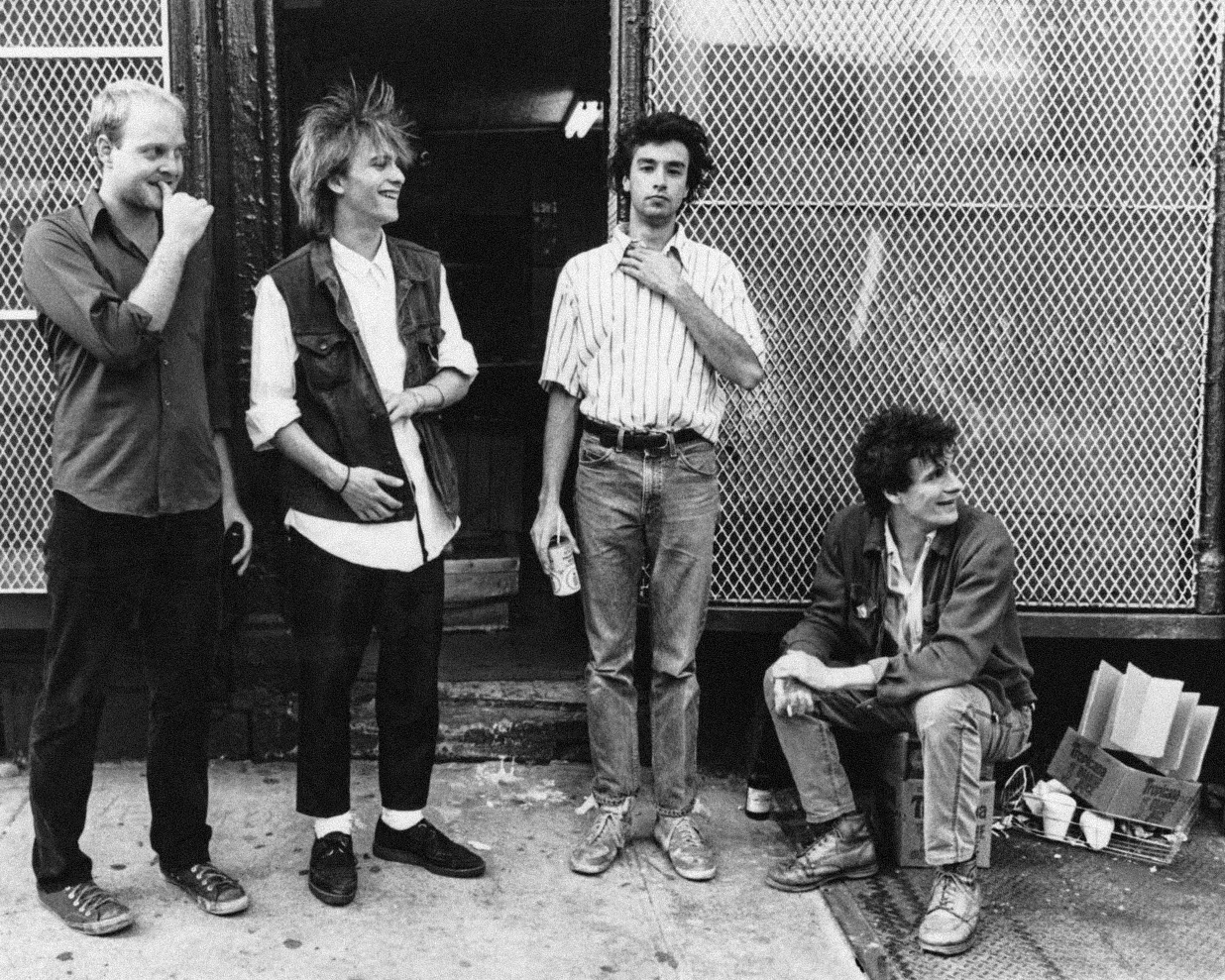
Mars (second from right) as part of the Replacements in 1984

Originally a guitarist, Mars moved to the drums when he formed the band Dog Breath with Bob & Tommy Stinson. Mars was the primary songwriter for the band until Paul Westerberg joined shortly afterwards. Dog Breath soon changed their name to the Impediments, followed by the Replacements. Mars explains how the band chose their name in his memoir:

Maybe the main act doesn’t show, and instead the crowd has to settle for an earful of us dirtbags. It seemed to sit just right with us, accurately describing our collective ‘secondary’ social esteem.

The band recorded a four-song demo tape in Mars' basement that Westerberg handed to Oar Folkjokeopus record store owner Peter Jesperson in May 1980. He was so impressed with the demo that he signed the band to Twin/Tone Records, the label he formed with recording engineer Paul Stark and music & sports writer Charley Hallman.

Their debut album, Sorry Ma, Forgot to Take Out the Trash was released on August 25, 1981. Mars co-wrote two tracks on the album ("Rattlesnake" & "I Hate Music") and receives song writing credit on every Replacements release through 1989's Don't Tell a Soul. For the title track of their second full length, Hootenanny, Mars & Westerberg traded instruments, as Mars played lead guitar & Westerberg played drums.

Their final album, All Shook Down, was originally intended to be Westerberg's solo debut until management talked him into doing it as a Replacements album before the recording started. Mars brought in a cassette tape of his own material that he recorded on a four-track. When Westerberg dismissed his songs out of hand, Mars decided it was time for him to leave the band altogether. Mars appeared on only a few songs on All Shook Down. He left before the subsequent tour, unhappy with Westerberg's increasing control of the band.

Mars reunited with his former bandmates to record "Message to the Boys" & "Pool & Dive for the Replacements greatest hits album Don't You Know Who I Think I Was?, released in 2006 by Rhino Records. Mars does not play drums on these tracks: they were played by session drummer Josh Freese while Mars sang backing vocals.

Mars sometimes transformed into an alter ego named "Pappy the Clown" while on the road with the Replacements. He painted his face when inebriated and spooked the band and road crew. In Rolling Stone's Alt Rock-a-Rama, Mars detailed the kind of hell-raising in which he and the other Replacements indulged when they were together. Among other incidents, Mars was thrown in jail for playing chicken with an officer in an unmarked police car. Also, he and Bob Stinson sabotaged a gig where he knew there would be a lot of record-industry personnel in attendance by going to a novelty store and purchasing some bottles of stink juice.

One of the more dangerous situations Mars found himself in while on the road with the Replacements occurred during a show at a club with a room underneath the stage that housed a 20-foot-long boa constrictor in a tank. Vibrations from the band’s playing dislodged the brick that held the top of the tank in place. It escaped and began slithering up through the sheetrock, popping its head out near Mars while he was playing.

=== Solo career ===
The first solo release by an ex-Replacement was Mars' Horseshoes and Hand Grenades on April 7, 1992. It was recorded at Prince's Paisley Park studio in Chanhassen, Minnesota, and released on PolyGram Label Group affiliate Smash Records. Despite Mars' lack of singing ability, many critics agreed that Horseshoes and Hand Grenades was the best of the early solo efforts following the Replacements' breakup.

Mars wrote every track on Horseshoes and Hand Grenades, including "Ego Maniac," which takes a jab at Westerberg's dictatorial style as frontman of the Replacements (Move aside you mice, let the king go up the ladder/Charity is a vice, I'm the only one that matters). Mars also played almost all the instruments on the album. J.D. Foster plays the bass guitar, and Dan Murphy & David Pirner from Soul Asylum guest on "Monkey Sees," "Before It Began," & "City Lights on Mars."

Mars followed it up the following year with 75% Less Fat, a title that takes a jab at his former Replacement bandmates. 75% Less Fat provided Knight Ridder's Steve Knopper with strong evidence that Mars "was the backbone of his famous former band, the Replacements," 75% Less Fat was also recorded at Paisley Park.

After 75% Less Fat, Mars provided the track "Gymnasium Blues (A True Story)" to a flexi-disc 7" promo single included with issue 46 of The Bob Magazine before moving over to Bar/None Records for his third solo effort, Tenterhooks (1995). His contract with Bar/None stipulated that he receive a $20,000, 16-track home studio, which he built in his living room. Mars chose not to tour in support of the album. Instead, he took the unorthodox approach of having a band named the Wallmen promoted it, placing a cardboard model of him onstage.

The only guest musician credited on his fourth solo album, Anonymous Botch, is Minneapolis computer repairman Chuck Whitney on the theremin. According to Bar/None Records' website, Anonymous Botch "features a plethora of famous mystery guests, many of whose contractual obligations with other record labels prevent them from being credited here," and that Mars "forfeits the skins (a career first) to the biggest, hottest drummer this side of Keith Moon, but his band doesn't know he's on the record." It also implies that the female vocals on "Janet's New Kidney" is Courtney Love. Other fan guesses at who could be dueting with Mars on "Janet's New Kidney" include Juliana Hatfield (who recorded an album with Westerberg}, Liz Phair & Kristin Hersh.

Mars self-published a fifth album, Note to Self, in 2017. He announced the news on Twitter and later on his Facebook page.

=== Painting career ===
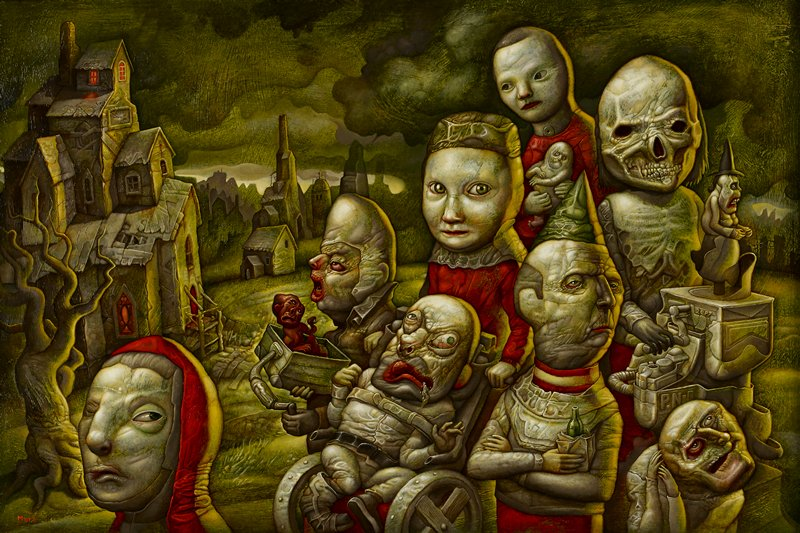
"Funeral March for the Minimal Man", a 2002 painting by Chris Mars held by the Minneapolis Institute of Arts

His painting style, examples of which grace all of his album covers, is marked by nightmarish landscapes and grotesque, distorted figures. He draws inspiration from his brother's struggle with schizophrenia:

My work continues to be and always will be inspired by my brother Joe & his plight. In general though my inspiration has branched from this initial seed to now to all forms of oppression, all societal outcasts. There are so many situations in the world that find people in heavy situations from so many causes past and present - my eyes continue to be opened, and I create work in hopes of opening more eyes.

He generally likes to use oils or pastels, although he ventures into other media, like acrylic and scratchboard. He created a 13-minute animated film about his work titled The Severed Stream.

Mars' work, which has fetched prices of more than $30,000, has been shown throughout the United States & Canada. He has had solo exhibitions at Billy Shire Fine Arts, the Erie Art Museum, the Minneapolis Institute of Arts, the Steensland Museum, the Coker Bell Gallery, and the Mesa Arts Center.

=== Personal life ===
Mars is known for his civic involvements, supporting causes such as Second Harvest Heartland, People Serving People & animal rescue organizations. He & his wife, Sally, founded Mutt Mutt Engine on February 4, 2019. Mutt Mutt Engine identifies dogs in need & people who need help caring for them. They rescue dogs in Minnesota, Boston, Denver, New York City, Maryland & fly them to "brighter futures."

He & Sally met on a blind date in 1987, shortly after Sally impulsively moved to Minneapolis & was working at a record store. When her friend heard that she had a fine arts degree, she offered to set her up with a guy who was a painter, not mentioning that he was in a band. When she met him, she immediately recognized him as the drummer for the Replacements.

Sally is an accomplished photographer, whose work is held in the collection of Boston Contemporary & has exhibited at the Minneapolis Institute of Art, Minneapolis Photo Center & other notable venues.

== Discography ==
=== The Replacements ===
- Sorry Ma, Forgot to Take Out the Trash (Twin/Tone Records, 1981)
- Hootenanny (Twin/Tone) (1983)
- Let It Be (Twin/Tone) (1984)
- Tim (Sire Records, 1985)
- Pleased to Meet Me (Sire, 1987)
- Don't Tell a Soul (Sire, 1989)
- All Shook Down (Sire, 1990)

=== Solo albums ===
- Horseshoes & Hand Grenades (Smash, 1992)
- 75% Less Fat (Smash, 1993)
- Tenterhooks (Bar/None, 1995)
- Anonymous Botch (Bar/None, 1996)
- Note to Self (self-published, 2017)

== Exhibitions & collections ==
=== Museum exhibitions (solo) ===
- 2021: Musee de la Bande Dessinee d'Angouleme, Angouleme, France
- 2010: Mesa Contemporary Arts, Mesa, AZ
- 2010: Erie Art Museum, Erie, PA
- 2010: Phipps Center for the Arts, Hudson, WI
- 2010: Phipps Center for the Arts, Hudson, WI
- 2009: Longview Museum of Fine Arts, Longview, TX
- 2009: Longview Museum of Fine Arts, Longview, TX
- 2005: Minneapolis Institute of Arts, Minneapolis, MN
- 2004: Erie Art Museum, Erie, PA
- 2000: Steensland Art Museum, Northfield, MN
