= The Replacements (band) =

American rock band (1979–2015)

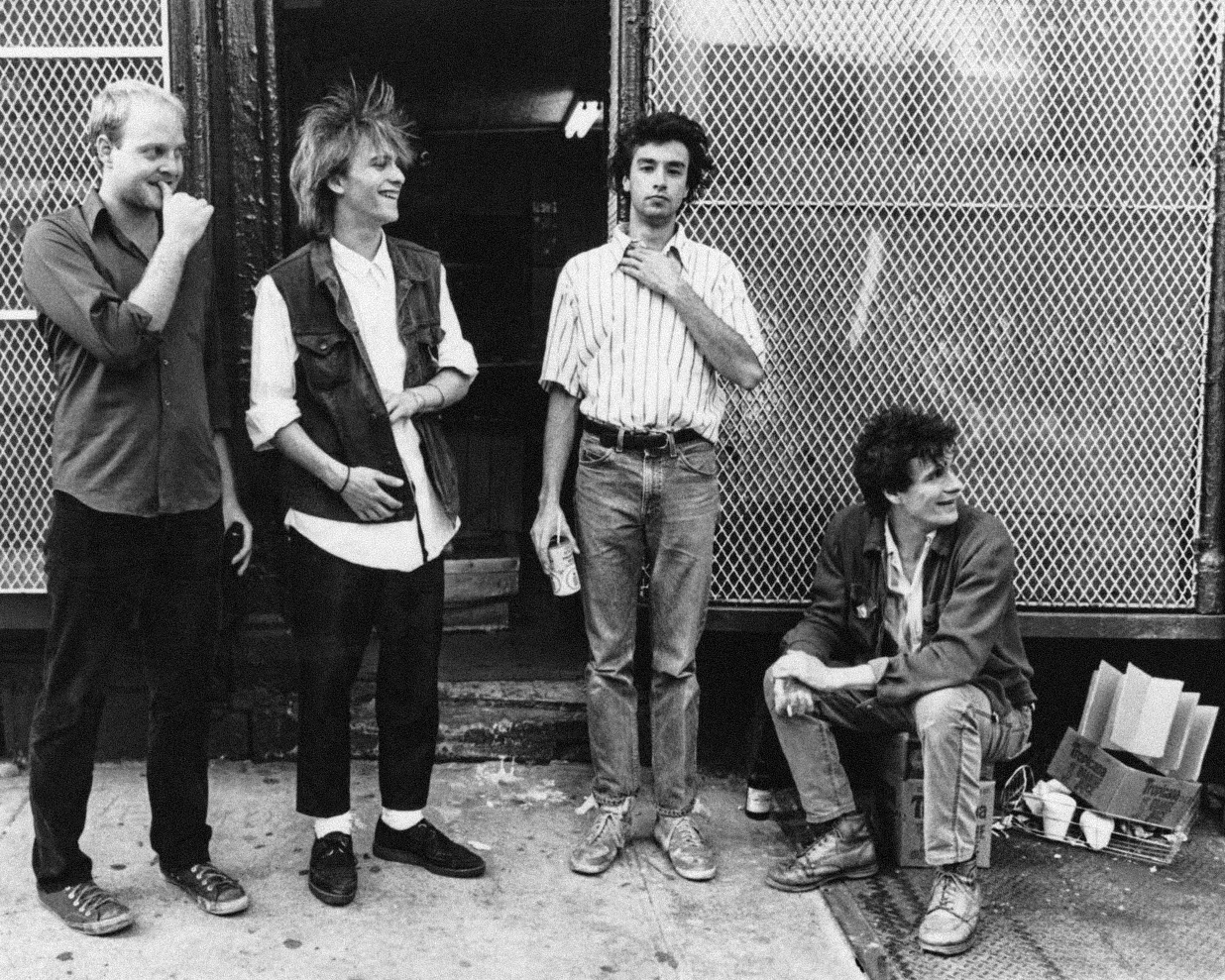
- The Replacements in 1984; from left to right: Bob Stinson, Tommy Stinson, Chris Mars, Paul Westerberg

Background information
- Also known as: Dogbreath; Impediments
- Origin: Minneapolis, Minnesota, U.S.
- Genres: Punk rock; alternative rock; college rock; hardcore punk (early)
- Works: Discography
- Years active: 1978–1991; 2006; 2012–2015
- Labels: Twin/Tone; Glass; Sire; New West; Reprise; Rhino
- Spinoffs: Bash & Pop; Perfect
- Past members: Paul Westerberg; Tommy Stinson; Chris Mars; Bob Stinson; Slim Dunlap; Steve Foley
- Website: thereplacementsofficial.com

The Replacements were an American rock band formed in Minneapolis, Minnesota, in 1978. The band was composed of the guitarist and vocalist Paul Westerberg, guitarist Bob Stinson, bass guitarist Tommy Stinson, and drummer Chris Mars for most of its existence. After two albums of relatively straightforward punk rock, they became among the main pioneers of alternative rock with their acclaimed albums Let It Be and Tim. Bob Stinson was kicked out of the band in 1986, and Slim Dunlap joined as lead guitarist. Steve Foley replaced Mars in 1990. Towards the end of the band's career, Westerberg exerted more control over its creative output. The group disbanded in 1991 and the members found various projects. A reunion was announced on October 3, 2012. Fans affectionately refer to the band as the 'Mats, a nickname which originated as a truncation of "The Placemats".

The Replacements' music was influenced by rock artists such as the Rolling Stones, the Beatles, Faces, Big Star, Slade, Badfinger, Creedence Clearwater Revival, and Bob Dylan as well as punk rock bands including the Ramones, the New York Dolls, the Buzzcocks, the Damned and the Sex Pistols. Unlike many of their underground contemporaries, the Replacements played "heart-on-the-sleeve" rock songs which combined Westerberg's "raw-throated adolescent howl" with self-deprecating lyrics. The Replacements were a notoriously wayward live act, often performing under the influence of alcohol and playing fragments of covers instead of their own material.

== History ==
=== Formation and early years (1978–1980) ===
The Replacements' history began in Minneapolis in 1978, when nineteen-year-old Bob Stinson gave his eleven-year-old brother Tommy Stinson a bass guitar to keep him off the streets. In the same year, Bob met Mars, a high school dropout. With Mars playing guitar and then switching to drums, the trio called themselves "Dogbreath" and began covering songs by Aerosmith, Ted Nugent and Yes without a singer. One day as Westerberg, who was a janitor in U.S. Senator David Durenberger's office, was walking home from work he heard a band playing in the Stinsons' house. After being impressed by the band's performance, Westerberg regularly listened in after work. Mars knew Westerberg and invited him over to jam. Westerberg was unaware Mars was a drummer in Dogbreath.

Dogbreath auditioned several vocalists, including a hippie who read lyrics off a sheet. The band eventually found a vocalist, but Westerberg wanted to be the singer and took him aside one day to say, "The band doesn't like you." The vocalist left and Westerberg replaced him. Before Westerberg joined the band, Dogbreath often drank and took various drugs during rehearsals, playing songs as an afterthought. In contrast to the rest of the band, the relatively disciplined Westerberg appeared at rehearsals in neat clothes and insisted on practicing songs until he was happy with them.

"They didn't even know what punk was. They didn't like punk. Chris had hair down to his shoulders," Westerberg told an interviewer. But after the band members discovered first-generation punk bands like The Clash, The Jam, The Damned, and The Buzzcocks, Dogbreath changed its name to the Impediments and played a drunken performance without Tommy Stinson at a church hall gig in June 1980. After being banned from the venue for disorderly behavior, they changed the name to the Replacements. In an unpublished memoir, Mars later explained the band's choice of name: "Like maybe the main act doesn't show, and instead the crowd has to settle for an earful of us dirtbags... It seemed to sit just right with us, accurately describing our collective 'secondary' social esteem".

=== Demo tape and Twin/Tone Records (1980–1981) ===
The band recorded a four-song demo tape in Mars's basement; Westerberg handed it to Peter Jesperson in May 1980. Jesperson was the manager of Oar Folkjokeopus, a punk rock record store in Minneapolis; he also founded Twin/Tone Records with Paul Stark (a local recording engineer) and Charley Hallman. Westerberg originally handed in the tape to see if the band could perform at Jay's Longhorn Bar, a local venue where Jesperson worked as a disc jockey. He eavesdropped while Jesperson put the tape on, only to run away as soon as the first song, "Raised in the City", played. Jesperson played the song again and again. "If I've ever had a magic moment in my life, it was popping that tape in", said Jesperson. "I didn't even get through the first song before I thought my head was going to explode".

Jesperson called Westerberg the next day, asking, "So do you want to do a single or an album?" With the agreement of Stark and the rest of the band, the Replacements signed with Twin/Tone Records in 1980. The band's first performance at a bar was at the Longhorn on July 2, 1980. Jesperson's support of the band was welcomed and they asked him to be their manager after their second show. Later in the summer they played at the Longhorn on a Wednesday "New Band Night".

They played several club gigs to almost empty rooms. When they finished a song, apart from the low hum of conversation, the band would hear Jesperson's loud whistle and fast clapping. "His enthusiasm kept us going at times, definitely," Mars later said. "His vision, his faith in the band was a binding force." After the Replacements signed with Twin/Tone, Westerberg began to write songs and had an album's worth of material. Weeks after their live debut, the band felt ready to record the album. Jesperson chose Blackberry Way, an eight-track home studio in Minneapolis. However, as the band had no clout there, time spent in the studio was intermittent, and it took about six months to record the album. Although not important at the time, Twin/Tone could not afford to release the album until August 1981. Because they were suspicious of the music business in general, the Replacements had not signed a written contract with Twin/Tone Records. Before settling on a title for the band's debut album, Westerberg considered the names Unsuitable for Airplay and Power Trash.

=== Early releases (1981–1982) ===
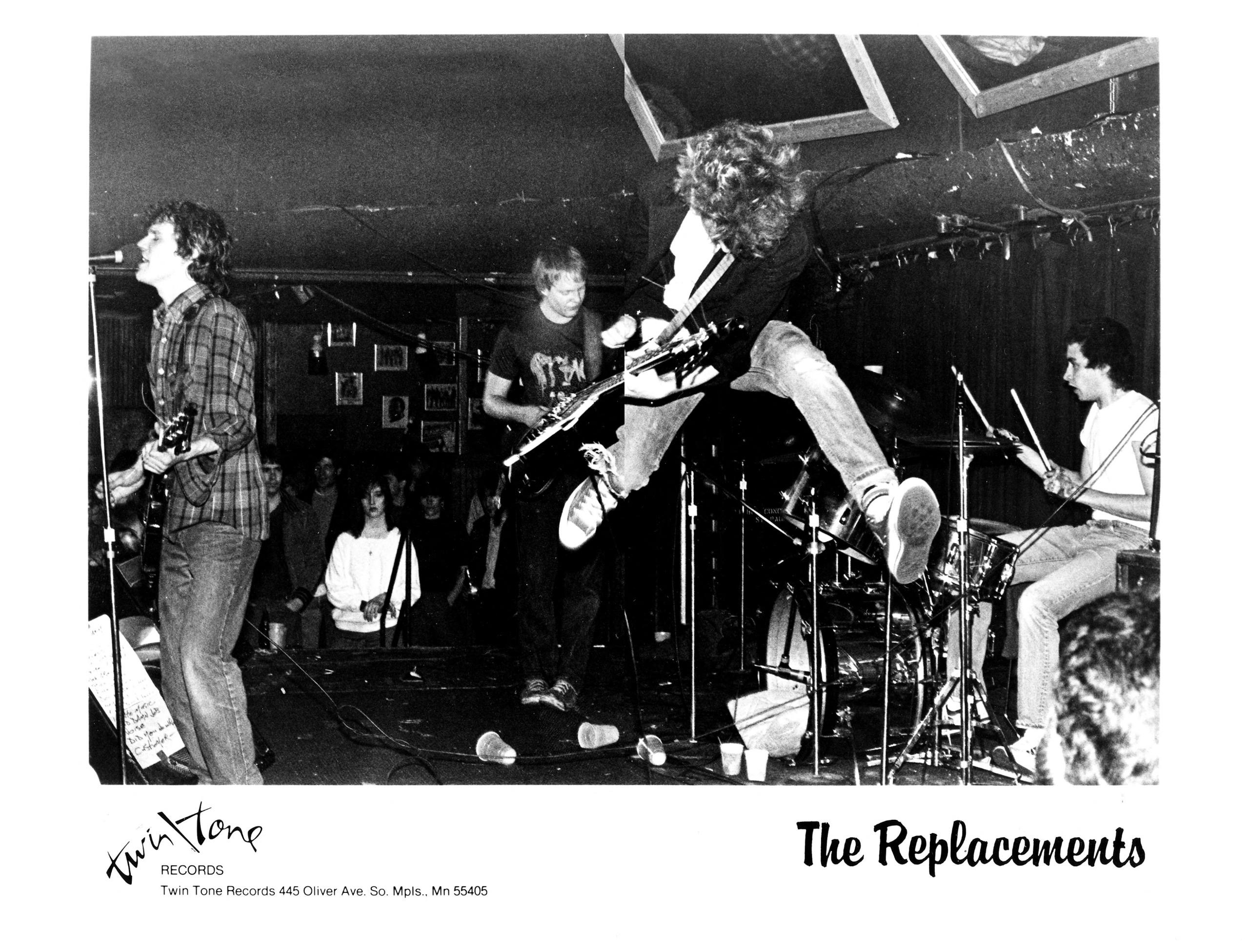
The Replacements in concert at the Minneapolis bar Duffy's, c. 1982 Left to right: Westerberg, Bob Stinson, Tommy Stinson, Mars

When the band's first album, Sorry Ma, Forgot to Take Out the Trash, was released in August 1981, it received positive reviews in local fanzines. Option's Blake Gumprecht wrote, "Westerberg has the ability to make you feel like you're right in the car with him, alongside him at the door, drinking from the same bottle." The album contained the band's first single, "I'm in Trouble", Westerberg's "first truly good song". Sorry Ma included the song "Somethin to Dü", a homage to another Twin Cities punk band, Hüsker Dü. The Replacements had a friendly rivalry with the band, which began when Twin/Tone chose the Replacements over Hüsker Dü.

Hüsker Dü landed an opening slot at a Johnny Thunders gig that the Replacements had wanted. Hüsker Dü also influenced the band's music, and the Replacements began playing faster and becoming more influenced by hardcore punk. Despite that the band did not feel part of the hardcore scene. As Mars later said, "We were confused about what we were." Sometime in late 1981, the Replacements played a song called "Kids Don't Follow". Jesperson was convinced the song sounded like a hit and pleaded with the Twin/Tone co-owners Stark and Hallman, "I will do anything to get this out. I will hand-stamp jackets if I have to." The partners agreed to fund the recording, but Jesperson and virtually everyone he knew had to hand-stamp ten thousand white record jackets. The band recorded eight tracks within a week, with Jesperson as producer. Their "balls-to-the-wall hardcore punk attempt", their first EP Stink, containing "Kids Don't Follow" and seven other songs, was released in June 1982, six months after a show in Chicago.

The Replacements began to distance themselves from the hardcore punk scene after the release of Stink. "We write songs rather than riffs with statements," Westerberg later stated. Inspired by other rock subgenres, he had been writing songs that incorporated a wide range of musical styles. He even wrote an acoustic ballad, "You're Getting Married One Night", but when he played it to the rest of the band, it was met with silence. "Save that for your solo album, Paul," Bob Stinson said. "That ain't the Replacements". The track remained unreleased for years. Westerberg realized his toughest audience was the band itself, later saying, "If it doesn't rock enough, Bob will scoff at it, and if it isn't catchy enough, Chris won't like it, and if it isn't modern enough, Tommy won't like it."

=== Hootenanny and Let It Be (1983–1984) ===
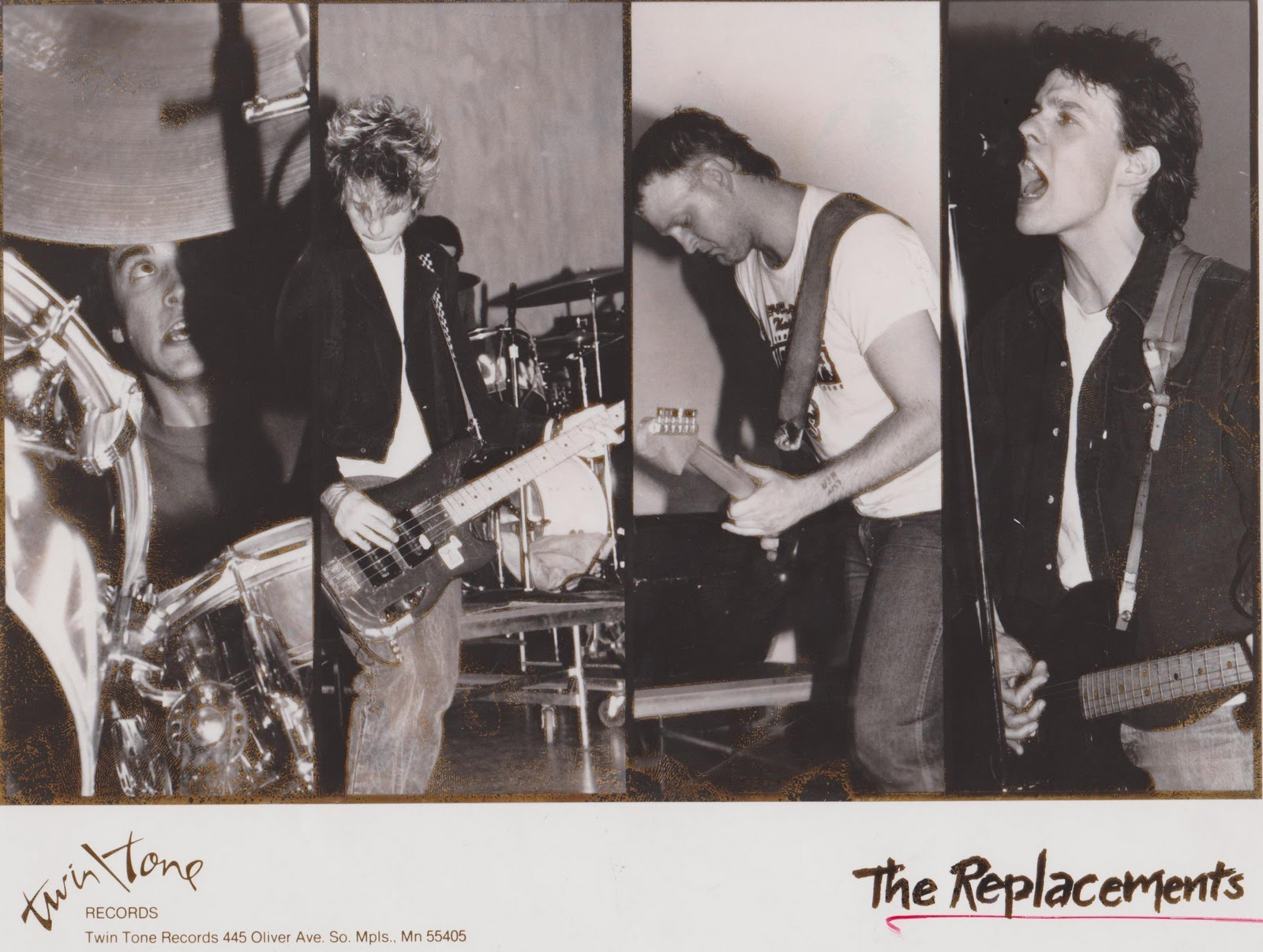
The Replacements publicity photo, c. 1983. Left to right: Mars, Tommy Stinson, Bob Stinson, Westerberg

With some new songs, the Replacements entered a warehouse in Roseville, Minnesota to record their next album; Twin/Tone co-owner Stark engineered. Westerberg wrote songs in stops and starts, so it took several sessions of recording to finish the album. Stark's meticulous approach to recording contrasted with that of the Replacements, often frustrating the band. In one session, Mars and Westerberg switched instruments and the band began to improvise, with Westerberg repeatedly shouting, "It's a hootenanny." The band declared it to be "side one, track one" of the new album. According to Stark, the recording "was a complete joke from their point of view—they did not care what they delivered".

Hootenanny, the band's second studio album, was released in April 1983. On Hootenanny Westerberg expanded his songwriting capabilities, in songs such as "Willpower", with echoed vocals and a sparse arrangement, and "Within Your Reach", which features Westerberg on all instruments, he revealed a more sensitive side. It was a more mature album than Stink and Sorry Ma, Forgot to Take Out the Trash. Hootenanny was played on over two hundred radio stations across the country, with critics giving the album acclaim. Robert Christgau, writing in the Village Voice, deemed it to be "the most critically independent album of 1983".

With Hootenanny's release, the Replacements had begun to attract a following outside of the Twin Cities. The band embarked on its first tour of the United States in April 1983, joined by Bill Sullivan, a young security guard, as roadie, who approached the band after a show at the Walker Art Center in Minneapolis. Tommy Stinson dropped out of the tenth grade, joining the rest of the band on tour. The Replacements toured venues on the East Coast, including a tense gig at City Gardens, in Trenton, New Jersey where numerous punks lined the edge of the stage as the band played. The band performed in Detroit, Cleveland, and Philadelphia but its intended destination was New York City, where they played at Gerde's Folk City; they also performed at Maxwell's, in Hoboken, New Jersey.

The Replacements returned to New York in June 1983, playing at CBGB. The gig was a failure; the band were almost refused entry. Bob Stinson was thrown out as soon as he walked in the door, and the Replacements were the last of five bands, which meant they played in the early morning on a Monday night. The show at Folk City was not a success, because "The Replacements were so loud and obnoxious that the people just cleared right out," according to manager Jesperson. The band supported R.E.M. on an eight-date tour later that summer, deciding that they should alienate the audience as much as possible. It was not a successful tour; by the end, various members had threatened to leave the Replacements. Band morale was low and Westerberg later said, "We'd much rather play for fifty people who know us than a thousand who don't care."

For the recording of their next studio album, the Replacements decided to return to Blackberry Way Studios in late 1983. The band considered R.E.M.'s guitarist Peter Buck as producer, but when they met him in Athens, Georgia, they did not have enough material to begin recording. Instead, Jesperson and Steve Fjelstad co-produced the album. By that time, the Replacements had grown tired of playing loud and fast exclusively; Westerberg said, "Now we're softening a little where we can do something that's a little more sincere without being afraid that someone's not going to like it or the punks aren't going to be able to dance to it."

The new material placed more of a focus on songwriting, and the music was influenced by heavy metal, arena rock and Chicago blues. Instruments such as piano, twelve-string guitar and mandolin were featured throughout the album. The new album included songs such as "I Will Dare", which featured Buck playing lead guitar; "Androgynous", with Westerberg on piano; and "Unsatisfied" in which, according to writer Michael Azerrad, Westerberg "had hit upon a moving new way to declare that he can't get no satisfaction." The band's album Let It Be was released in October 1984 to critical acclaim. Robert Christgau gave the album an A+, and the Seattle Rocket critic Bruce Pavitt called Let It Be "mature diverse rock that could well shoot these regional boys into the national mainstream". In 1989, Let It Be was ranked number 12 on Spin magazine's list of the "25 Greatest Albums of All Time" and number 15 on Rolling Stone magazine's list of the "100 Greatest Albums of the 1980s".

=== Early major-label releases (1985–1988) ===
Let It Be attracted the attention of major record labels, and by late 1984 several had expressed an interest in signing the Replacements. Financially, the band was not doing well; they were not selling enough records to recoup their expenses, and money from shows went to recording costs, hotels, travel, food and instrument repairs. Bob Stinson worked a day job as a pizza chef. Twin/Tone was not being paid reliably by distributors, and the sales of Let It Be were not high enough to justify extra promotion. "It was time for a major label to take over," according to the label's co-owner Stark. The band was close to a major-label contract but often alienated label representatives by intentionally performing badly in concert; their 1985 live album, The Shit Hits the Fans, was an example of their concert performances at the time.

One label, the Warner Bros. Records subsidiary Sire Records, eventually signed the Replacements. The band admired the label head, Seymour Stein, who had managed the Ramones, and Stein recruited Tommy Ramone as producer for their first major-label album, Tim, released by Sire in October 1985.

For the rest of 1985 and the first half of 1986 the band toured behind Tim. In mid-January 1986 the Replacements received a last-minute request to appear as the musical guests on the January 18 episode of Saturday Night Live, replacing the scheduled act, The Pointer Sisters, who had been forced to cancel only days before the show. The invitation was partly thanks to the show's musical director of the time, G.E. Smith, who was a Replacements fan. However, as a result of their shambolic and profanity-laced performance during the late-night live broadcast, SNL producer Lorne Michaels banned them from ever returning to the show (although Westerberg returned as a solo artist in 1993, and was even allowed to play a Replacements song.)

After playing an out-of-tune "Bastards of Young" (during which Westerberg audibly called out "Come on fucker" just off-mic) the band returned to stage wearing mismatched iterations of each other's clothing and performed "Kiss Me on the Bus" while completely intoxicated. In a 2015 interview recorded for the Archive of American Television, G. E. Smith recalled that although the band had performed well for the early evening taped dress rehearsal performance, one of the band's crew then smuggled alcohol into their dressing room and they spent the next few hours drinking (with the guest host, Harry Dean Stanton) and taking drugs. According to Smith, by the time of the late-night live broadcast they were so intoxicated that on their way to the stage to perform, Bob Stinson tripped in the corridor, fell over onto his guitar and broke it, and Smith had to hurriedly loan him one of the SNL house band's spare instruments.

A few weeks later, on February 4, 1986, the band returned to the New York City area to perform at Maxwell's in Hoboken, New Jersey. The show was professionally recorded by a crew hired by the band's label Sire Records, for use in a possible live album. Over 30 years later, the recordings were released as the double album For Sale: Live at Maxwell's 1986. The tour ended abruptly in June 1986 because Westerberg injured his finger during a show at The Ritz in New York City.

In August 1986, the Replacements either fired Bob Stinson from the band which he had founded, or he chose to leave, or a little of both. In any case, it was due to creative and personal differences between Stinson and the remainder of the band, aggravated by Stinson's alcohol and drug abuse issues. They also fired Jesperson the same year. "It was like being thrown out of a club that you helped start," Jesperson later commented. "Everybody was drinking and doing more drugs than they needed to."

Stinson preferred the louder, faster style of the band's early music, while Westerberg was exploring new territory in ballads like "Here Comes a Regular" and "Swingin' Party". The remaining Replacements carried on as a trio for Pleased to Meet Me (1987), recorded in Memphis with Big Star producer Jim Dickinson. Minneapolis guitarist Slim Dunlap took over on lead guitar for the subsequent tour and soon became a full member of the band.

=== Don't Tell a Soul and All Shook Down (1989–1990) ===
The band's next album, Don't Tell a Soul, was a quieter, less punky affair, largely considered an attempt at mainstream success. While the move cost the Replacements the appreciation of some hardcore fans, the album had some notable songs, such as "Achin' to Be" and "I'll Be You", the latter of which topped the Billboard Modern Rock chart. The band then made a second appearance on network television, on the short-lived ABC program International Rock Awards, for which they performed a typically energetic version of "Talent Show" and caused a minor controversy when Westerberg responded to the network's censoring of the "feeling good from the pills we took" line by inserting an uncensored "It's too late to take pills, here we go" at the end of the song. The band appeared on the cover of Musician magazine in February 1989, in which it was described as "the last, best band of the 80s".

Trouble in the band began following a disastrous tour opening for Tom Petty and the Heartbreakers. Westerberg recorded a new album largely with session musicians but was persuaded to release it as a Replacements album. All Shook Down won critical praise and more mainstream attention and its debut single "Merry Go Round" again topped the Modern Rock charts. However, the album's many guest players and Mars' quick departure from the band following the album's release led many to wonder about the band's future. They also received a nomination for a Grammy Award for Best Alternative Music Album.

=== Breakup (1991–2011) ===
Steve Foley was recruited as Mars's replacement in 1990, and the band toured with Elvis Costello in June 1991, the final show being at Madison Square Garden. The band embarked on a long farewell tour which lasted into the summer of 1991. On July 4, 1991, the band played their last show for 22 years, with the Chicago power-pop trio Material Issue at Taste of Chicago in Grant Park, referred to by fans as "It Ain't Over 'Til the Fat Roadie Plays", because each member disappeared during the set, their respective roadies taking their places. This show was broadcast live by the Chicago radio station WXRT. Several bootlegs are available on the Internet.

After leaving the Replacements in 1986, Bob Stinson played in local Minneapolis bands such as Static Taxi and the Bleeding Hearts. After several years of drug and alcohol abuse, he died in 1995, at the age of 35. Tommy Stinson quickly followed his time in the Replacements with the short-lived bands Bash & Pop and Perfect. He was the bass guitarist for Guns N' Roses beginning in 1998, replacing Duff McKagan from the band's "classic lineup" until leaving the band in 2016. In 2004, he released a solo CD, Village Gorilla Head, followed in 2011 by One Man Mutiny.

Westerberg is a successful singer-songwriter signed to Vagrant Records and, under his alias Grandpaboy, to Fat Possum Records. His album Folker was released in September 2004, marking a return to the melodic low-fi of the Replacements. Dunlap kept a low national profile but remained active in the Twin Cities music scene until suffering a massive stroke in 2012, which left him without the ability to move or eat. He died in 2024. Mars primarily works as a visual artist.

In 1997, Reprise Records released the two CD set All for Nothing / Nothing for All. The All for Nothing disc collected cuts from Tim through All Shook Down; the Nothing for All disc is a collection of B-sides and tracks not previously released on albums.

In 2002, in an interview with Rolling Stone, Westerberg mentioned that the Replacements had been considering a reunion. He said, "We'll get together again one day. It will take a while, or it might take a few legal swipes of the pen, but we ain't over." A partial reunion nearly occurred in March 2002, when Tommy Stinson planned to join Westerberg on a tour of the Midwest, but Stinson's prior commitments with Guns N' Roses prevented it from happening.

In 2004, active members of the band performed as the fictional Christian Rock group, Godflight, in Brian Dannelly's cult classic satirical black comedy, Saved!, starring Jena Malone, Mandy Moore, Eva Amurri, and Macaulay Culkin.

On June 13, 2006, Rhino Records released the compilation album Don't You Know Who I Think I Was?, consisting of songs from the Twin/Tone and Sire-Reprise years and including two new songs, "Pool & Dive" and "Message to the Boys". The new songs were written by Westerberg and recorded by the band (Westerberg, Tommy Stinson, and Mars) at Flowers Studio in Minneapolis. Session musician Josh Freese (the Vandals, ex-A Perfect Circle, and ex-Guns N' Roses) played drums on the two tracks; Mars contributed backing vocals. Neither Slim Dunlap nor Steve Foley participated in the sessions.

On April 22, 2008, Rhino released remastered deluxe editions of the band's four Twin/Tone albums with rare bonus tracks. On September 24, 2008, Rhino similarly released the four Sire albums in deluxe editions. Material recorded with Tom Waits in 1988 was released on the Westerberg solo album 3oclockreep in 2008.

Foley died in 2008 from an accidental overdose of a prescription medication.

=== Reunion (2012–2015) ===
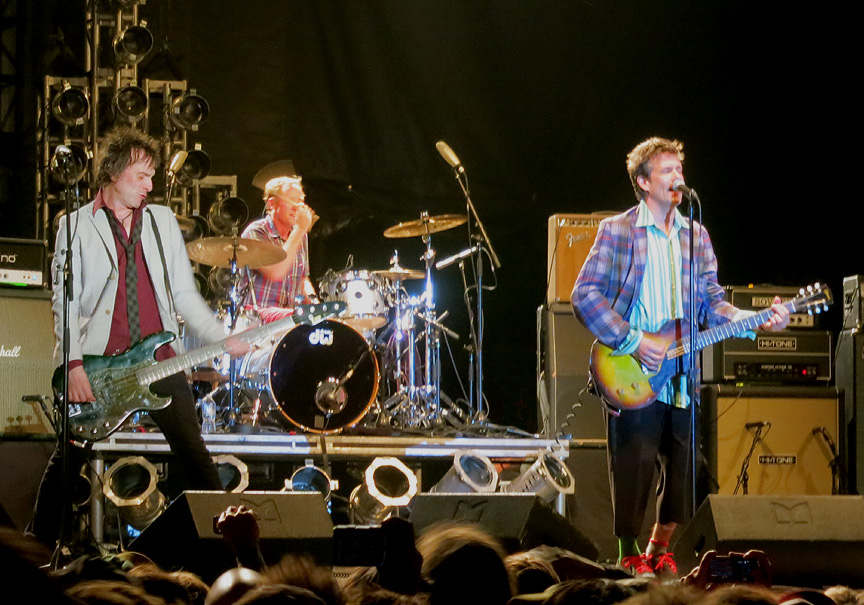
The Replacements performing in Toronto, 2013

On October 3, 2012, it was announced that the Replacements had re-formed and that Westerberg and Tommy Stinson were in the studio recording an EP containing song cover versions. Titled Songs for Slim, the EP was sold in a 250-copy edition of 10" vinyl and auctioned online to benefit former bandmate Dunlap, who had suffered a stroke.

In November 2012, the documentary filmmaker Gorman Bechard released Color Me Obsessed, a film which tells the band's story through the eyes of their most ardent fans.

The Replacements played their first shows in 22 years at Riot Fest in Toronto (August 24 and 25, 2013), Chicago (September 13–15) and Denver (September 21 and 22). Dave Minehan, guitarist and vocalist of the Boston-based band the Neighborhoods as well as drummer Josh Freese rounded out the lineup for the shows.

Westerberg said that the band has not ruled out touring or recording a new album. The band played two sets at the Coachella Valley Music and Arts Festival, on April 11 and 18, 2014; Green Day front man Billie Joe Armstrong joined the band onstage on the second date. The band was also announced as one of the headliners of the September 2014 Boston Calling Music Festival, along with Lorde and the National. On September 9, 2014, the Replacements appeared as the musical guest on The Tonight Show, performing "Alex Chilton". On September 19, 2014, they played at Forest Hills Stadium. Monsoon rains cancelled the Summer Ends Music Festival in Tempe, Arizona, on September 27, 2014, resulting in their only indoor show of the tour when it was moved to the Marquee Theatre.

On December 17, 2014, a 24-minute jazz improvisation track entitled "Poke Me in My Cage" was uploaded to the band's SoundCloud account.

On February 9, 2015, the band announced a spring tour of the United States. On this tour, they debuted a new song called "Whole Foods Blues", and according to their co-manager Darren Hill, the band has "laid down seven or eight" for a possible new album. Towards the end of the tour, two shows in Columbus, Ohio and Pittsburgh were initially postponed for medical reasons, but were later canceled. The Replacements performed for the first time in Spain and Portugal at the Primavera Sound festival on May 28, 2015, and June 5, 2015, respectively as part of a brief European tour. On June 5, 2015, Westerberg announced onstage at the Primavera Sound festival in Porto, Portugal, that it was the band's final show. T-shirts Westerberg had worn to previous shows had hinted at this outcome: each shirt had two letters on it (one each on front and back) spelling out, "I have always loved you. Now I must whore my past."

In a September 2015 interview, Stinson discussed the band working on new studio material, stating, "it was one of those things: We dipped our toe in the water, and it didn't feel so good." Stinson said that he had reworked songs he wrote for the Replacements as material for his solo career.

== Live performances ==
The Replacements gained local notoriety following their first live performance because of Tommy Stinson's young age. Early shows were consistently tight and became more aggressive following the release of the Stink EP in 1982. As their stylistic repertoire began to expand with the writing and recording of Hootenanny the following year, the band's increasingly antagonistic stage show left them with a reputation for their rowdy, often drunken live shows. The band frequently went on stage too intoxicated to play. They were famously permanently banned from Saturday Night Live after Westerberg shouted a (mostly) off-microphone profanity, directed at guitarist Bob Stinson, before a national television audience on January 18, 1986.

As a reviewer succinctly observed, the band could quite often be "mouthing profanities into the camera, stumbling into each other, falling down, dropping their instruments, and generally behaving like the apathetic drunks they were." There emerged an element of unpredictability, as the Replacements—when sober—gained critical praise for their live shows. Part of the mystique of the Replacements was that the audience never knew until the start of a concert if the band would be too drunk to play. It was not uncommon for the group to play entire sets of cover versions, ranging anywhere from Bryan Adams's "Summer of '69" to Dusty Springfield's "The Look of Love" to Led Zeppelin's "Black Dog".

== Legacy ==
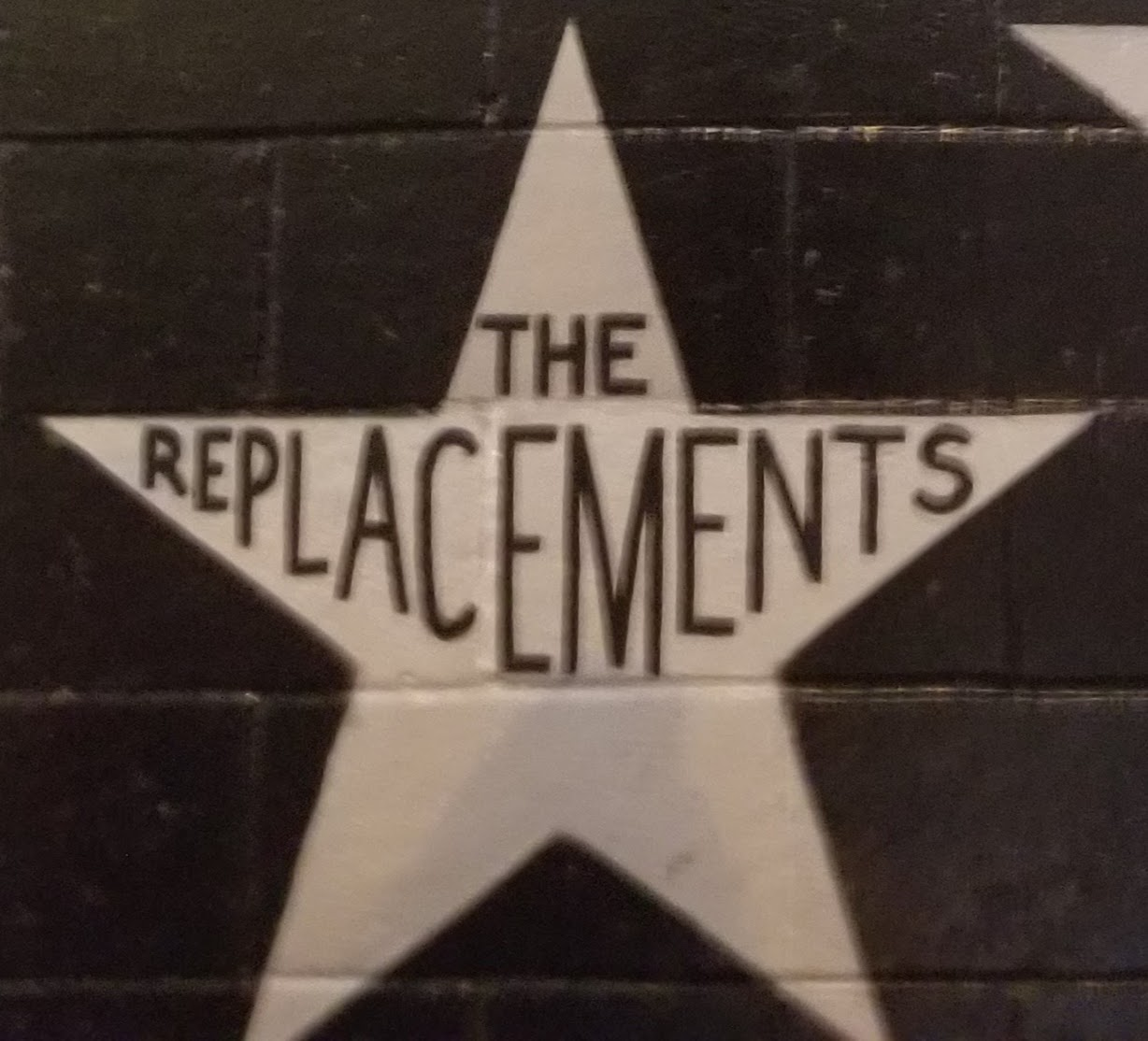
The Replacements' star on the outside mural of the Minneapolis nightclub First Avenue

The band has been honored with a star on the outside mural of the Minneapolis nightclub First Avenue, recognizing performers that have played sold-out shows or have otherwise demonstrated a major contribution to the culture at the iconic venue. Receiving a star "might be the most prestigious public honor an artist can receive in Minneapolis," according to journalist Steve Marsh. Westerberg also has a star for his solo work; he is one of the few musicians to be honored with multiple stars on the mural.

The Goo Goo Dolls' vocalist and guitarist Johnny Rzeznik cites Paul Westerberg as an "obvious influence" on his music. The Goo Goo Dolls toured in support for the Replacements' final tour. They also co-wrote the song "We Are the Normal" with Westerberg for their 1993 album Superstar Car Wash. Members of the Cribs have cited the Replacements as a key influence. Members of the alternative country groups Uncle Tupelo and Whiskeytown have said that the Replacements were an important influence on them. Brian Fallon of Gaslight Anthem said in a 2009 interview that "without the Replacements, there would be no Gaslight Anthem" and that they were inspired by the song "Left of the Dial". The band They Might Be Giants made a tribute song to them called "We're The Replacements". Filmmaker James Gunn has named the Replacements as a favorite.

1234 Go! Records released We'll Inherit the Earth: A Tribute to The Replacements on October 3, 2006. The album contains twenty-three covers of the Replacements songs by various rock, punk, pop and country artists.

On October 16, 2013, the band was announced as one of the 2014 Rock and Roll Hall of Fame nominees, but they were not inducted. "Alex Chilton" appears as a playable song in Harmonix's music videogame Rock Band 2 for all consoles. "Kids Don't Follow" was also released for the game as downloadable content.

Indie rock band Art Brut released a song titled "The Replacements" on their third album (Art Brut vs. Satan), in which singer Eddie Argos expresses both appreciation for the band, and incredulousness over the fact he was not already familiar with their music.

The Replacements are the favorite band of the character Ramona Flowers from the Scott Pilgrim series.

Their songs have been used in many feature films. "Treatment Bound" was used in the official soundtrack for Jackass Number Two. The 1998 teen comedy film Can't Hardly Wait is named after their single, and the song itself plays over the end credits. The song "I Will Dare" is sung by Keanu Reeves and Cameron Diaz in the car in Feeling Minnesota. Lou and Nick contemplate their lives and the possibility of changing the past in the 2010 comedy Hot Tub Time Machine while "I Will Dare" plays in the background.

"I'll Be You" plays during Jerry's bachelor party in the 1996 romantic comedy-drama sports film Jerry Maguire. The 2009 Greg Mottola film, Adventureland, opens with "Bastards of Young". The song "Unsatisfied" is used in the film during the bus ride to New York. The song was also featured in the 1994 film Airheads and the 2016 film Ordinary World. The fictional band the Fingers, in the movie Losers Take All, gets their big break by securing a gig opening for the Replacements. "Within Your Reach" was used in the 1989 film Say Anything. "Here Comes a Regular" was on the episode "Rigby's Graduation Day Special" on Cartoon Network's Regular Show. "Here Comes a Regular" was on the episode "The Wind That Blew My Heart Away" on One Tree Hill. Peyton's mother describes the song as "the happiest" and it is heard playing in the episode. "Here Comes a Regular" also appeared in the final episode of the Netflix series 13 Reasons Why.

In what could be considered the only case of the Replacements receiving any official recording industry accolades, the band's biographer Bob Mehr received the Best Album Notes trophy at the 63rd Annual Grammy Awards in 2021 for his liner notes on the 2019 box set Dead Man's Pop, which is itself an anniversary reissue of their 1989 album Don't Tell a Soul.

In 2023, Tommy Stinson said:

Part of our lure is that we stayed underground. We stayed underground, for the most part, because of our shortcomings ... But that was also, somehow, our strong-suit—that we were so unable to conform to what would make us star-quality or what would catapult us. We always felt like the music had to do it, that we couldn't do something with the music to make us more popular. In saying that, there were a lot of opportunities that I think we probably pissed away—because we just didn't know how to greet them artistically and make them fun or make them palatable. We pretty much wung [sic] our entire career. From top to bottom, we were total defects and we didn't know any better. All that you hear is exactly the way we were. It's the good, the bad and the ugly, really.

== Members ==
- Paul Westerberg – vocals, guitar (1979–1991, 2006, 2012–2015)
- Tommy Stinson – bass guitar (1979–1991, 2006, 2012–2015)
- Bob Stinson – guitar (1979–1986; died 1995)
- Slim Dunlap – guitar (1987–1991; died 2024)
- Chris Mars – drums (1979–1990)
- Steve Foley – drums (1990–1991; died 2008)

Touring musicians

- Josh Freese – drums (2006, 2012–2015)
- Dave Minehan – guitar (2012–2015)

Timeline

== Discography ==
- Sorry Ma, Forgot to Take Out the Trash (Twin/Tone) (1981)
- Hootenanny (Twin/Tone) (1983)
- Let It Be (Twin/Tone) (1984)
- Tim (Sire) (1985)
- Pleased to Meet Me (Sire) (1987)
- Don't Tell a Soul (Sire) (1989)
- All Shook Down (Sire) (1990)
