= Bob Stinson =

American guitarist (1959–1995)

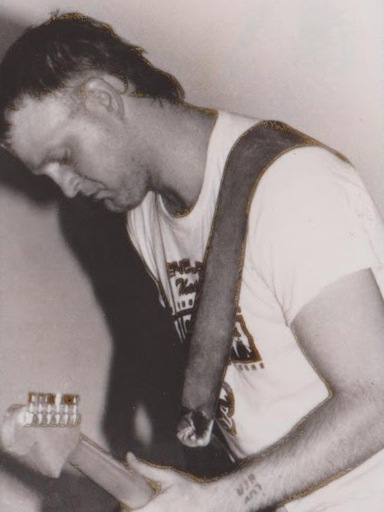
- Stinson in 1983

Background information
- Born: Robert Neil Stinson; December 17, 1959; Waconia, Minnesota, U.S.
- Origin: Minneapolis, Minnesota, U.S.
- Died: February 18, 1995 (aged 35) Minneapolis, Minnesota, U.S.
- Genres: Alternative rock; punk rock; post-punk
- Occupation: Musician
- Instrument: Guitar
- Years active: 1978–1994
- Formerly of: The Replacements, Model Prisoner, Static Taxi, The Bleeding Hearts

Robert Neil Stinson (December 17, 1959 – February 18, 1995) was an American musician best known as a founding member and lead guitarist of the rock band the Replacements.

== Early life ==
Bob Stinson was born on December 17, 1959, in Waconia, Minnesota, to Neil and Anita Stinson. A year later, Anita gave birth to Lonnie. Neil was an uninterested father, and the couple soon divorced when Bob was two years old. Anita moved to California where she met a man who fathered two more children: Tommy and Lisa.

Tommy's father relentlessly abused Stinson, verbally, physically, and sexually. Stinson's resultant behavior became unruly enough by the spring of 1975 that he was given a psychiatric evaluation. Residential treatment was recommended, and he entered the St. Cloud Children's Home. Stinson broke out often and committed petty crimes. By the summer, he was remanded into juvenile custody and sent to the State Training School at Red Wing.

Stinson was paroled from Red Wing in May 1976 and transitioned to another facility designed to help him finish high school. He met future bandmate Robert Flemal at the halfway house. In the fall, Stinson got a job as a dishwasher at Mama Rosa's, an Italian restaurant in Dinkytown.

== Career ==
=== The Replacements (1979–1986) ===
Bob Stinson's guitar idols were Johnny Winter and Steve Howe. In 1978, Stinson and drummer Chris Mars formed Dog's Breath in Minneapolis, Minnesota. The name, also styled as Dogbreath, was designed to evoke disgust. Bob dragged his 11-year old brother Tommy into a rehearsal one day to play bass. He used Yes' "Roundabout" and Peter Frampton's "Show Me The Way" to teach Tommy to play the instrument.

Dog's Breath mostly played covers and pastiches at keg parties for Stinson's co-workers at Mama Rosa's. They sometimes set up on the roof of the Stinson's house and blasted the neighborhood until the police arrived. The lineup included Robert Flemal on rhythm guitar and occasional vocals by Stuart Cummins. It was a fast and screeching version of "Roundabout" that caught Paul Westerberg's ear a half mile away from the house where Dog's Breath were rehearsing in the fall of 1979. Westerberg quickly maneuvered Flemal and Cummins out of the band and rechristened it The Impediments. Eventually, they adopted The Replacements. The band initially disliked Westerberg's original songs, dismissing them as "punk rock".

The Replacements never outgrew their juvenile garage band origins. Stinson described the unit as "four idiots on stage trying to one-up each other". When Peter Jesperson went to see the band after hearing their demo, he was struck by their buffoonery and raw talent, "Bob in particular could be positively clownish, all the while doing these searing leads that seemed to come from a different universe than any guitar player I'd heard before." He quickly moved to get them into a proper studio in order to release an album on his label, Twin/Tone Records. Stinson won acclaim for his lead guitar on the band's first four albums. Spin raved, "Nobody could fuck up a guitar solo more beatifically than Bob Stinson".

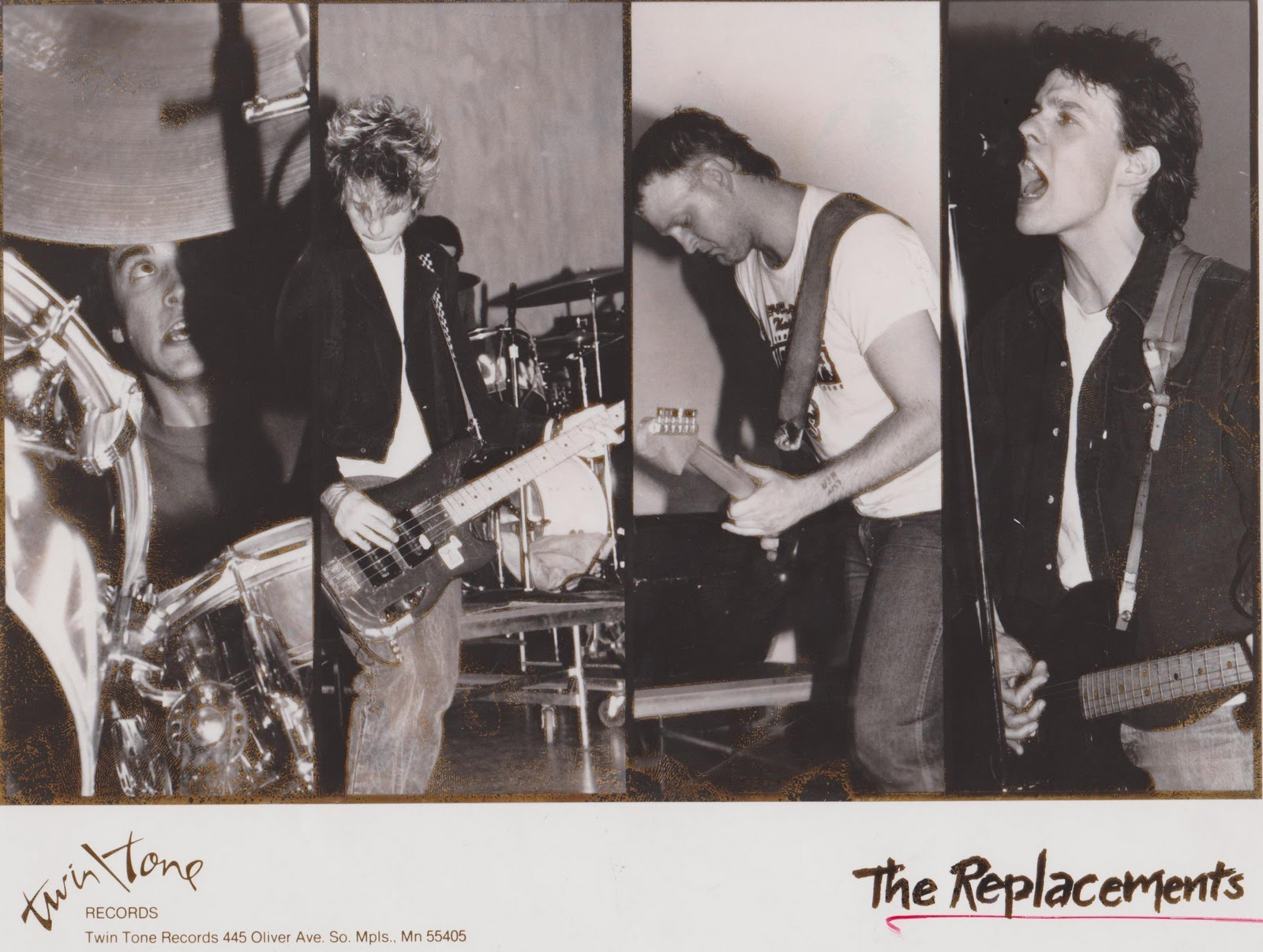
Stinson (second from right) as part of the Replacements in 1983

On Tim, the Replacement's first album for Sire Records, Stinson recorded his parts in one day. Producer Tommy Ramone had to figure out how to piece them together. In 1985, the power struggle between Stinson and Westerberg reached a breaking point. Due to Stinson's substance abuse, he was forced out of the band in the summer of 1986. Stinson's last stint in the band was on the demos for the album Pleased to Meet Me.

Just prior to his ouster, Stinson was sentenced to a month of in-patient addiction treatment after he hit his wife. He was sober for 12 weeks. At the beginning of a five-night residency at 7th St. Entry with the Replacements, Westerberg insisted Stinson drink champagne with him. Stinson became convinced no one wanted to work with him unless he was intoxicated. Two weeks later, Westerberg forced Stinson out of the band, citing pressure from Sire Records about his behavior. Both Westerberg and Tommy Stinson abused substances, and Mars recalls that their addictions grew worse after Bob left the band. Tommy Stinson and Westerberg continued the "extreme hypocrisy" of their personnel decisions when they dismissed Mars in 1990, ostensibly for drinking too much. The band folded soon afterwards.

As their career continued, The Replacements spun Stinson's ouster as the result of a group maturation that he was unable to join. The myth was often parroted by the press. Westerberg claimed, "I ran out of ideas that Bob could shine on...we drank and took drugs a lot. All of that. But Bob thought that was the Replacements. He didn't understand, oh, we gotta play some music, too."

The band often shared stories of Stinson's misbehavior. While promoting 1989's Don't Tell a Soul, Westerberg claimed to a reporter Stinson was so out of it during the recording sessions for Tim that he had to tell Stinson where to put his hands on the guitar. The same article relentlessly depicts the band as a collection of drunks. In a 1993 profile of Stinson, Charles Aaron summed up the contradiction:

...Westerberg was spooked that the band was being pigeonholed as out-of-control boobs. So he contrived a reality for outsiders in which Bob was the out-of-control boob. Which wasn't too difficult, since Bob was drunk, high, or in a dress most of the time ... But Westerberg's fatal contradiction was that he made the argument against Bob with a drink in his hand.

=== Later projects (1986–1994) ===
Summarizing his divorce from the Replacements, Stinson quipped, "I started that band and I ended that band when I left". He told Spin, "when I left, the Replacements were like a body without a face". Stinson joked that the band without him were "The Diet Replacements". In 1987, he formed Model Prisoner with Sonny Vincent. When Stinson's behavior threatened the band, Vincent took the entire group to therapy instead of firing Stinson. The lineup consisted of Sonny Vincent on vocals and guitar, Stinson on guitar, Eric Magistad on bass and Jeff Rogers on drums. Other members included Jim Michels and Mike Henderson. The band performed live and they recorded an album at Nicollet Studios (Twin Tone) before breaking up in 1988.

That year, Stinson joined Static Taxi. Static Taxi recorded extensively, but their only commercial releases were posthumous compilations. Stinson also played with the local band Dog 994 around this time.

Stinson reteamed with Sonny Vincent in Shotgun Rationale. The band covered "Time Is Mine", by Vincent's earlier band the Testors. The cover featured guitarist Steve Brantseg from Tommy Stinson's post-Replacements band Bash & Pop. Shotgun Rationale's lineup changed constantly. At one point Stinson and Vincent invited Cheetah Chrome (of Dead Boys) to join the band. Vincent deliberately kept the Shotgun Rationale lineup loose so that eccentrics like Stinson and Chrome could come and go. He recalled Stinson once copping drugs onstage from an audience member.

In 2010, Sonny Vincent compiled all the songs he recorded with Stinson over the years into the album Cow Milking Music, which he released under the name Model Prisoners Featuring Sonny Vincent And Bob Stinson. The album was released on vinyl, with CD included, along with many photos of Stinson from Vincent's archives and a four-page story detailing the history of their collaboration and friendship.

His last band was the Bleeding Hearts, a bar band in the vein of The Rolling Stones. While he was in the band, he crashed on the couch of its singer Mike Leonard. Bleeding Hearts began recording an album in March 1993. They signed a record deal and completed the album in November. The album, Riches to Rags, was not released until 2022.

Stinson's last public performance was playing with Minneapolis country swing band Trailer Trash at Lee's Liquor Lounge in late 1994. They performed a version of Lefty Frizzell's "Lil 'Ol Wine Drinker Me".

== Personal life ==
After the Replacements fired him, Stinson was diagnosed with manic depression. His mother recalled that he was diagnosed as psychotic when he was 12 but never received treatment. He was never a full-time musician again. He worked as a cook in various Twin Cities restaurants and hotels.

In the mid-1980s, Stinson married Carleen Krietler. The couple had a son Joey in 1989, who was profoundly disabled. Carleen filed for divorce around 1992. Joey died in 2010 at the age of 21.

== Death ==
Stinson died on February 18, 1995. His body was found next to an unused syringe in his Uptown apartment. The media speculated he died from an overdose or "bad heroin". Two weeks later, the Hennepin County Medical Examiner disproved those rumors in a report stating Stinson died from organ failure as a result of his drug use. The assistant medical examiner told the press, "There is such a thing as total body failure. In general, all the organs – especially the liver – take a beating when they've been subject to years of excessive drug and alcohol abuse."

Sorry Ma, Forgot to Take Out the Trash was played at Stinson's wake. Next to a canal near Lake of the Isles in Minneapolis, a park bench dedicated to Stinson sits in a spot where he liked to fish and daydream. It was purchased by his mother Anita in his honor.

== Discography ==
- Shotgun Rationale, Beyond Rebellion (D.D.R., 1992).
- Static Taxi, Stinson Blvd. (Rock X Change Music, 2000).
- Static Taxi, Closer 2 Normal (Birdman Records, 2003).
- Model Prisoners Featuring Sonny Vincent And Bob Stinson, Cow Milking Music (Disturbed Records, 2010).
- The Bleeding Hearts, Riches to Rags (Fiasco/Bar None, 2022).
