= Peter Jesperson =

American music industry businessman

Peter Jesperson is an American music industry businessman from Minneapolis, Minnesota, known for his involvement in discovering the Replacements, and for later serving as their manager. He also co-founded Twin/Tone Records along with Paul Stark and Charley Hallman, and managed the record store Oar Folkjokeopus during the 1970s and early 1980s.

== Recent work ==
In 1995, Jesperson moved out of Minneapolis to work at New West Records in Los Angeles, where he was still working as of 2011. Jesperson led an effort called Songs For Slim to raise money for former Replacements guitarist Slim Dunlap's medical care after Dunlap had a stroke in 2012, by releasing a series of 7"s. This effort was later endorsed by a number of notable musicians, including Steve Earle and Lucinda Williams, and also led to the 2013 release of Songs for Slim, an EP featuring Replacements members Paul Westerberg, Tommy Stinson, and Chris Mars, which Len Comaratta described as "the closest thing yet to a reunion of the Replacements."
