= Bash & Pop =

American alternative rock group

- Origin: Minneapolis, Minnesota, United States
- Genres: Alternative rock
- Years active: 1992–1994, 2016–present
- Labels: Sire/Reprise/Warner Bros.
- Members: Tommy Stinson; Steve Selvidge; Joe Sirois; Justin Perkins
- Past members: Steve Foley; Steve Brantseg; Kevin Foley; Caleb Palmiter

Bash & Pop are an American alternative rock band formed in 1992 by Tommy Stinson in Minneapolis, Minnesota, following the breakup of the Replacements. It released one album before disbanding in 1994. Tommy Stinson reformed the band in 2016 with a new lineup and album.

== History ==
With a name selected from a contest hosted by New York radio station WDRE, Bash & Pop was formed in 1992 by bassist Tommy Stinson, following the breakup of his previous group The Replacements. Stinson switched to guitar, with Steve Foley (from The Replacements) on drums, his brother Kevin Foley on bass, and Steve Brantseg on guitar.

The album Friday Night Is Killing Me was recorded by the band with the assistance of Benmont Tench and Mike Campbell, Wire Train's Jeff Trott as well as other musicians Greg Leisz, Brian McCloud, Phil Jones and Tommy Steel. The album was released in January 1993 through Sire/Reprise Records to mainly mixed reviews with Stewart Mason, of Allmusic, stating that "there are a couple of great songs here, the catchy single "Loose Ends" and the rocking "Fast and Hard", but even those two songs feel sloppily half-written, with choruses that vamp on repeatedly for far too long. Most of the rest of the album sounds fine while it's playing, but the songs aren't at all memorable." Steven Mirkin, of Rolling Stone, described the album as "not as pointed as ex-Mats drummer Chris Mars's vitriolic Horseshoes and Hand Grenades and lacking Westerberg's songwriting polish, Friday Night Is Killing Me is still a notable debut that at its best flashes the easygoing, knockabout charm missing from the Replacements' last few albums." Bruce Haring, of Variety, described the album as "a frisky little rocker propelled by Stinson's endless energy and peppy, raspish vocals." A tour in support followed along with the recording of the track "Making Me Sick" which was included on the soundtrack, released in 1994, to the movie Clerks. The group disbanded later in 1994.

Describing the band's dissolution, Stinson said:

"It just never turned into the band I envisioned it to be. When The Replacements broke up, my original idea was to form a group that was basically the same thing the Mats were early on, which was a spirited band with a good chemistry, and which shared the same vision. We tried that with Bash & Pop with two different lineups, but I never really found four people who shared that camaraderie. I got along okay with both lineups, but the chemistry was never there."

— Tommy Stinson, Goldmine, Issue 424, October 25, 1996

== Post-breakup ==
Stinson went on to form another group, Perfect, before going on to join Guns N' Roses and releasing his debut solo album Village Gorilla Head while drummer Steve Foley joined Wheelo, previously known as 69, releasing the album Something Wonderful in 1997.

== 2016 reunion ==
Tommy Stinson worked on new material in 2015 and 2016, releasing two songs on the L.M.A.O. EP, and later decided to release a record as a band under the name of Bash & Pop, as he felt that it was more of a band record. He launched a PledgeMusic campaign to fund the album. On November 2, 2016, the new album was announced to be called Anything Could Happen, with the release date being set on January 20, 2017. A music video for the song "On The Rocks" was also released.

== Band members ==
1992-1994

- Tommy Stinson – vocals, rhythm guitar
- Steve Brantseg – lead guitar
- Kevin Foley – bass
- Steve Foley – drums, percussion

2016–present

- Tommy Stinson – vocals, rhythm guitar
- Steve Selvidge – lead guitar
- Justin Perkins – bass
- Joe Sirois – drums, percussion

== Discography ==
=== Studio albums ===
- Friday Night Is Killing Me (1993)
- Anything Could Happen (2017)

=== Singles ===
- Too Late/Saturday (Featuring Nicole Atkins) (2017)

=== Compilations ===
- Clerks: Music from the Motion Picture (1994) The track "Making Me Sick"
