= Metawar =

Studio album by 3Teeth
- Released: July 5, 2019
- Genre: Industrial metal; industrial rock; industrial; nu metal; alternative metal; electronic rock
- Length: 46:50
- Label: Century Media
- Producer: Sean Beavan

3Teeth chronology
<shutdown.exe> (2017)	Metawar (2019)	EndEx (2023)

Singles from Metawar
- 1. "American Landfill" Released: April 5, 2019; 2. "Exxxit" Released: April 23, 2019; 3. "Affluenza" Released: May 31, 2019; 4. "President X" Released: June 14, 2019; 5. "Pumped Up Kicks" Released: June 28, 2019; 6. "Altær" Released: January 17, 2020

Metawar is the third studio album by the American industrial metal band 3Teeth. It was released on July 5, 2019 as the band's first album on their new label, Century Media Records.

== Release and promotion ==
Initial work on the album began in early 2018 following extensive touring in support of <shutdown.exe>. Sean Beavan returned to work with the band once again, taking on mixing and production duties for the new album. The band announced the completion of the album on December 22, 2018 via their official Instagram page and a tentative release window of Spring 2019 was set.

The first single, "American Landfill", was released worldwide on April 5, 2019, alongside the official announcement of the July 5 global release date. Alongside the new album announcement, the band also announced a summer tour in support of Ministry. Frontman Mincolla described the new album as focusing on the idea of world versus world. According to Mincolla, "If our debut album was focused on man vs. the world, and our sophomore album was man vs. himself, then I really wanted to Metawar to focus on the idea of world vs world, and the notion that if man doesn’t create his own world then he’s often crushed by the world of another."

The music video for "American Landfill" debuted on April 15, 2019. The video was directed by Matthew Charles Santoro, longtime friend of Alexis Mincolla and Hollywood director and visual effects artist whose credits include X-Men Origins: Wolverine and 300. "Exxxit" was released as the second single with an accompanying music video on April 23. "The song hinges on a conceptual ultimatum and the human urge towards self-destruction as a form of liberation," Mincolla said. The video, which features performance artist Jeanelle Mastema suspended from hooks, was described as "gruesome" and "NSFW" and was inspired by concepts featured in Albert O. Hirschman's 1970 treatise Exit, Voice, and Loyalty. "Exxxit" premiered alongside a North American tour announcement featuring Author & Punisher and GOST as support.

The third single supporting the album, Affluenza, was released on May 31, 2019. Mincolla describes Affluenza as being "the all-consuming epidemic of our time. It's a socially transmitted disease that infects via the prosthetic digital nervous system when exposed to the conspicuous consumption based infotoxins emitted from Kim Kardashian's ass." An official lyric music video was released for the single as well. The fourth single promoting the album, President X, was released on June 14, 2019. The single was accompanied by a music video featuring Mincolla as a neo-fascist lizard-man president in "band's most outwardly political song to date."

The fifth single released was the band's cover of "Pumped Up Kicks" by Foster the People which was released on June 28, 2019. A fifth music video was released alongside the single as well. On why the band decided to do a cover song, Mincolla said "Industrial bands have a long history of subverting popular culture songs...We’ve just always been a fan of this sort of thing and felt it would be a good time to take an iconic song of the late 2000s and give it some unexpected 2019 industrial darkness." On January 17, 2020, Altær was released as the album's sixth single along with a music video.

While touring in support of Metawar, the band recorded one original track and two cover songs for the film Guns Akimbo. Their cover of You Spin Me Round (Like a Record) by Dead or Alive was featured in the film's trailer, and it was later announced that the second cover song would be The Ballroom Blitz originally recorded by The Sweet.

== Composition ==
Metawar has been described as industrial metal industrial rock, industrial, nu metal, alternative metal, and electronic rock.

== Critical reception ==
Professional ratings
Aggregate scores
Source	Rating
Metacritic	61/100
Review scores
Source	Rating
AllMusic	4.5/5 stars
Bring the Noise	8/10
Exclaim!	8/10
Maximum Volume	8/10
Kerrang!	1/5
Noizze	8.5/10
Sputnikmusic	3.2/5 stars
Shropshire Star	9/10

Metawar received generally positive reviews from critics. At Metacritic, which assigns a normalized rating out of 100 to reviews from mainstream critics, the album has an average score of 61 out of 100, which indicates "Generally favorable reviews" based on 4 reviews. Loudwire named it one of the 50 best metal albums of 2019.

== Charts ==
Following its release, Metawar became the band's most commercially successful album, debuting at #23 on Billboard and at #28 on the iTunes Top Albums chart as well as the #1 album on the iTunes Metal charts. The album also debuted at #82 on Billboard's Top Album Sales chart for the week of July 20, 2019, and at #3 on Billboard's Heatseekers Albums for the same week. With the release of Metawar, 3teeth themselves charted at #25 on Billboard's Emerging Artists chart.

== Track listing ==
No.	Title	Writer(s)	Length
1.	"Hyperstition"		1:01
2.	"Affluenza"		3:38
3.	"Exxxit"		3:33
4.	"American Landfill"		3:08
5.	"President X"		3:41
6.	"Altær"		4:07
7.	"Time Slave"		3:27
8.	"Bornless"		3:27
9.	"Surrender"		4:05
10.	"Sell Your Face 2.0"		3:49
11.	"Blackout"		3:49
12.	"The Fall"		4:33
13.	"Pumped Up Kicks" (Foster the People cover)	Mark Foster	4:32
Total length:			46:50

Notes

- All tracks are stylized in all caps.

== Personnel ==
3Teeth

- Alexis Mincolla – vocals, lyrics
- Chase Brawner – guitars
- Xavier Swafford – keyboards, synthesizers
- Andrew Means – bass, modular synthesizers
- Justin Hanson – drums

Production

- Sean Beavan – programming, engineering, and mixing
- Juliette Beaven – additional vocals
- Howie Weinberg – mastering
- Mike Glitter – A&R
- Don Robertson – A&R

Visual personnel

- Alexis Mincolla – art direction
- Marcel Lagerquist – graphic design
- Mihail Aleksandrovich – 3D modeling
- Sqeuoia Emmanuelle – photography
