= EndEx =

Studio album by 3Teeth
- Released: September 22, 2023
- Genre: Industrial; industrial metal
- Length: 46:46
- Label: Century Media
- Producer: Sean Beavan; Chase Brawner; Mick Gordon; Andrew Means; Nicholas Rowe; Tensor; Xavier Swafford

3Teeth chronology
Metawar (2019)	EndEx (2023)

Singles from EndEx
- 1. "Paralyze" Released: August 6, 2021; 2. "Merchant of the Void" Released: May 3, 2023; 3. "Slum Planet" Released: May 31, 2023; 4. "Scorpion" Released: June 30, 2023; 5. "Drift" Released: July 26, 2023; 6. "Higher Than Death" Released: August 24, 2023

EndEx is the fourth studio album by the American industrial metal band 3Teeth. It was released on September 22, 2023, through Century Media Records. It received acclaim from critics.

== Recording and promotion ==
3Teeth began writing and recording material for the album in 2020 during the COVID-19 pandemic. The band rented a house in the Joshua Tree National Park in California and released the first single, "Paralyze", a collaboration track with Ho99o9. The song was produced by Mick Gordon. On May 3, 2023, the second single, "Merchant of the Void", was released. They also announced that they will be releasing a new song each month until the album is out. The third single, "Slum Planet", was released on May 31. "Scorpion", the fourth single, was released on June 30. They also announced the album's title and release date of September 22, 2023. "Drift", the fifth single, was released on July 26. "Higher Than Death", the sixth single, was released on August 24.

== Critical reception ==
Professional ratings
Aggregate scores
Source	Rating
Metacritic	85/100
Review scores
Source	Rating
AllMusic	4.5/5 stars
Blabbermouth.net	8.5/10
Classic Rock	4/5 stars
Kerrang!	3/5
MetalSucks	4/5 stars
Sputnikmusic	4.0/5

EndEx received a score of 85 out of 100 on review aggregator Metacritic based on four critics' reviews, indicating "universal acclaim". Neil Z. Yeung of AllMusic summarized EndEx as "another collection of angry, jagged diatribes that denounce all that's wrong with the world while providing a soundtrack to an inevitable end. [...] Yet, as with every other one of their albums, this impending doom never sounded so good." Classic Rock described it as "a disorienting yet potently addictive mix, reflective of industrial metal's labyrinthine roots in electronica, new wave and beyond". Anne Erickson of Blabbermouth.net wrote "The tracks on "EndEx" are cleansing, climaxing anthems with Mincolla's hair-raising vocals sounding as bleak and doomy as ever...3TEETH are here to champion industrial metal and make sure the genre stays relevant for years to come."

James Hickie of Kerrang! wrote that "EndEx doesn't win many points for going where no band has gone before" and finding it to be "an album with bite, even if it takes a moment to successfully grip the listener". Mandy Scythe writing for MetalSucks stated, "EndEx plays up its industrial nature. And thanks to their collaboration with co-producer Doom composer Mick Gordon, the whole experience is a dense, odd, and slightly off-putting effort — in the best way possible." Simon K. of Sputnikmusic called it "a merciful entry that seems to almost fully acknowledge Metawar's main problems. On the whole, EndEx is an excellent entry that sticks close to the band's strongest attributes, albeit, not without its frustrating moments".

== Track listing ==
EndEx track listing
No.	Title	Writer(s)	Producer(s)	Length
1.	"Xenogenesis"	Chase Brawner; Andrew Means; Alexis Mincolla; Xavier Swafford; Jordan Davis	Brawner; Swafford; Tensor	3:52
2.	"Acme Death Machine"	Brawner; Means; Mincolla; Swafford	Brawner; Swafford	4:25
3.	"Slum Planet"	Brawner; Means; Mincolla; Swafford; Nicholas Rowe	Brawner; Swafford; Mick Gordon; Rowe	3:30
4.	"What's Left"	Brawner; Means; Mincolla; Swafford; Rowe	Brawner; Means; Swafford; Gordon; Rowe	3:36
5.	"Merchant of the Void"	Brawner; Means; Mincolla; Swafford; Michael Gordon; Rowe	Brawner; Means; Swafford; Gordon; Rowe	3:32
6.	"Higher Than Death"	Brawner; Means; Mincolla; Swafford; Gordon; Swafford	Brawner; Swafford; Gordon; Rowe	4:19
7.	"Alien"	Brawner; Means; Mincolla; Swafford	Brawner; Swafford	3:24
8.	"Plutonomicon"	Brawner; Means; Mincolla; Swafford	Brawner; Means; Swafford	4:31
9.	"Paralyze" (featuring Ho99o9)	Brawner; Means; Mincolla; Swafford; Lawrence Eaddy; Jean Lebrun	Brawner; Means; Swafford; Rowe; Gordon^{[a]}	3:35
10.	"Scorpion"	Brawner; Means; Mincolla; Swafford; Davis	Brawner; Swafford; Rowe; Tensor	3:34
11.	"Drift"	Brawner; Means; Mincolla; Swafford; Rowe	Brawner; Means; Swafford; Rowe	4:05
12.	"Everybody Wants to Rule the World" (Tears for Fears cover)	Chris Hughes; Roland Orzabal; Ian Stanley	Brawner; Means; Swafford; Sean Beavan	4:23
Total length:				46:46

Note

- "Alien" is stylized "ALI3N"

== Personnel ==
3Teeth

- Alexis Mincolla – vocals
- Chase Brawner – guitars, programming, synthesizers (all tracks)
- Xavier Swafford – keyboards, synthesizers, programming (all tracks)
- Andrew Means – bass, programming, synthesizers
- Nick Rossi – drums

Additional

- Sean Beavan – mixing (1, 4, 5, 7–12)
- Will Borza – mastering
- Chase Brawner – engineering (1–4, 6–10, 12), mixing (track 2)
- Zakk Cervini – mixing (3, 6)
- Ho99o9 – vocals (track 9)
- Jim Louvau – photography
- Alexis Mincolla – art direction, graphic design
- Nicholas Rowe – engineering (all tracks), vocal engineering (1, 2, 7, 8, 12), programming (3, 10, 11)
- Xavier Swafford – engineering (9)

== Charts ==
Chart performance for EndEx
Chart (2023)	Peak position
UK Album Downloads (OCC)	63
UK Rock & Metal Albums (OCC)	21
