= One Man Mutiny =

Studio album by Tommy Stinson
- Released: 2011
- Genre: Rock
- Label: Done to Death
- Producer: Phillip Broussard Jr.

Tommy Stinson chronology
Village Gorilla Head (2004)	One Man Mutiny (2011)

One Man Mutiny is an album by the American musician Tommy Stinson, released in 2011. The first single was "Meant to Be". Stinson donated some of the proceeds from the album to the Timkatec school, in Haiti. Stinson supported the album with a North American tour.

== Production ==
One Man Mutiny was produced by Phillip Broussard Jr. Stinson recorded the album over the course of a few years, using time between Guns N' Roses tours; members of Guns N' Roses contributed to the album. Some of the tracks were recorded at Geo Sound, in Philadelphia. Paul Westerberg cowrote "Match Made in Hell". The title track was recorded in a restaurant in Brussels. The first version of "Destroy Me" was written in the late 1990s. "Meant to Be" is a duet with Stinson's wife.

== Critical reception ==
Professional ratings
Review scores
Source	Rating
Arkansas Democrat-Gazette	B+
Long Island Press	7.5/10

The Philadelphia Inquirer wrote that One Man Mutiny "contains riff-driven rockers, a couple of tunes with a countryish bent, and quieter moments that recall Replacements leader Paul Westerberg at his most reflective and openhearted." The Boston Globe noted the "loose-limbed, Stones-y rave-ups." The Arkansas Democrat-Gazette deemed the album a "gritty set that has some nice slide guitar action."

NPR praised "Stinson's amiable rasp and keen ear for melody." Cincinnati CityBeat called the album "raw and elemental Stonesy rock with twangy overtones, circa Exile on Main Street." The Long Island Press considered "Match Made in Hell" to be "a tongue-in-cheek odd couple ditty with a luau vibe." Spin labeled One Man Mutiny "a homespun collection of crystalline guitar-pop and confessional balladry."

== Track listing ==
No.	Title	Length
1.	"Don't Deserve You"
2.	"It's a Drag"
3.	"Meant to Be"
4.	"All This Way for Nothing"
5.	"Come to Hide"
6.	"Seize the Moment"
7.	"Zero to Stupid"
8.	"Match Made in Hell"
9.	"Destroy Me"
10.	"One Man Mutiny"
