= Perfect (American band) =

American alternative rock band

- Origin: Minneapolis, Minnesota, U.S.
- Genres: Pop rock, alternative rock, hard rock
- Years active: 1995–1998
- Labels: Medium Cool, Restless, Rykodisc
- Past members: Tommy Stinson; Marc Solomon; Robert Cooper; Dave Philips; Gersh

Perfect was an American alternative rock group formed in 1995 by Tommy Stinson, formerly of The Replacements, in Minneapolis, Minnesota following the breakup of previous group, Bash & Pop. It released an EP in 1996 and their debut album, recorded in 1997, was issued in 2004 nearly seven years following the group's breakup in 1998.

== History ==
Following the breakup of previous group Bash & Pop, Stinson formed Perfect along with the group's guitarist Marc Solomon, bassist Robert Cooper as well as drummer Gersh. After playing a number of shows, they were soon signed to Medium Cool Records by label head Peter Jesperson, who was also an old manager of The Replacements, where they began recording for a debut EP.

The When Squirrels Play Chicken EP, produced by Don Smith, was released in 1996 to positive reviews with Greg Prato, of Allmusic, stating "fans will undoubtedly be more pleased with his new band, Perfect, which is much more focused, and in the expected drunken-Johnny Thunders guitar-rock style."

In 1997 the group entered the studio with producer Jim Dickinson to produce their debut album, tentatively titled Seven Days a Week. Stinson had now switched back to bass for the departed Cooper, and added Dave Philips on guitar. Despite completing the album, it was shelved by Regency Pictures, who had acquired Medium Cool distributors Restless Records, which led to the group's eventual breakup in 1998. The album itself was leaked onto the internet through advance copies which had been sent out to record labels, however a remixed and resequenced version of Seven Days a Week, retitled Once, Twice, Three Times a Maybe, was released by Rykodisc in 2004. which was, much like the EP, well received.

== Post-breakup ==
Following the breakup, Stinson was hired by Guns N' Roses to replace departed bassist Duff McKagan in 1998 as well as releasing his debut solo album, Village Gorilla Head, in 2004, which featured contributions by Perfect bandmates Philips and Gersh. He also joined Soul Asylum, replacing Karl Mueller, and helped finish the rest of the recording for the album The Silver Lining released in 2006.

Guitarist Philips went on to tour with Frank Black, of the Pixies, in Frank Black and the Catholics recording a number of albums. In February 2021, Philips died from cancer at the age of 52.

Solomon played in the groups Clumsy and Solly. Cooper went on to play with Solomon in Clumsy and Solly as well as forty marshas with Mike Malinin of the Goo Goo Dolls. Perfect's drummer, Gersh, opened a drum sales and rental firm.

== Band members ==
- Tommy Stinson – vocals, guitar
- Marc Solomon – guitar, vocals
- Dave Phillips – guitar, vocals (died 2021)
- Robert Cooper – bass guitar, vocals
- Gersh – drums
- Jeff Bossin – bass, vocals

== Discography ==
Studio albums

- Once, Twice, Three Times a Maybe (2004)

EPs

- When Squirrels Play Chicken (1996)
