= Moth (band) =

American alternative rock band

- Brad Stenz (left) and Kevin Hogle (right) at the American Sign Museum in October 2008

Background information
- Origin: Cincinnati, Ohio, US
- Genres: Alternative rock; indie rock; power pop; garage rock
- Years active: 1989–2007
- Labels: Holographic; Wonder Boy; Virgin; Vital America; Hey Domingo!; High Wire Music
- Past members: Brad Stenz; Kevin Coleman; Jason Hounshell; Bob Gayol; Mike Lamping; Zy Orange Lyn; Dan Allaire; Greg Slone; Theodore Liscinski; Adam Willard; Kevin Hogle; Bill Buzeck; Eric Diedrichs; Eli White; Ryan Malott

Moth is an American alternative rock band from Cincinnati, Ohio formed in 1989. The band has released five albums including a major label release on Virgin Records. They have done live performances on The Late Late Show, AOL, and Mancow's Morning Madhouse, numerous national tours and a UK tour. They have received critical acclaim from Rolling Stone, Blender, Spin, Billboard, Alternative Press, Stuff, CMJ, Guitar World, The New York Times, and Los Angeles Times.

== History ==
=== Formation and early years (1989–1999) ===
Brad Stenz grew up in Westwood after moving from New York City when he was 11 years old. At 15 he was a fledgling songwriter who didn't want to sing. He was the reluctant frontman and only ended up singing because no one else would. Stenz attended the School for Creative and Performing Arts, until he convinced his parents he should just do music. He formed the band in 1989 with bassist Jason Hounshell and drummer Kevin Coleman. They called themselves Bug for a while, after the album by Dinosaur Jr., whom they admired greatly. In 1991, they recorded their first album.

In October 1992, they began working with James Sfarnas and his label Holographic Records. Under Holographic they re-released their self-recorded first album, Moth. That release was well received with indie press and college radio throughout the U.S. Following that release, Holographic took the band back in the studio to record "Deeper Green" and "Skinny Flesh" with producer Bill Halverson, which were released nationally as a 45 rpm single in 1993. The single received rave reviews and much airplay on college radio and enabled the band to tour for the first time.

Shortly after, Moth began recording songs for their second album, Big League Fantasy Camp. The album was released in 1996 after sitting on a shelf for nearly two years while Moth toured heavily on their own dime. All songs were recorded at Findlay Street Recording Studios (except "Deeper Green" and "All") and engineered by Jim Sfarnas, Charles Iliff, Paul Bellows and Moth. "Deeper Green" was recorded and engineered by Bill Gwynne at Group Effort Studios and produced by Bill Halverson. The album was mixed at Quadrafix studios in Hollywood, CA by James Sfarnas, and financed by Holographic Records.

=== Provisions, Fiction and Gear (2000–2002) ===
Moth had finished our third independent album in Cincinnati when a production company in New York contacted the band with an interest in signing us. After a few flights back and forth from Cincinnati to New York and meeting with Ric Wake's side man Marc Russel, we struck a production deal. Soon after enlisting the help of Cincinnati studio musicians Greg Slone and Zach Mechlem, we recorded the album with producers Danny Haze and Jeff Monroe over a period of three months. Less than a year later after shopping what would eventually become part of Provisions, Fiction and Gear, Tony Berg head of A&R for Virgin Records America got in touch with us and was very enthusiastic. We hit it off incredibly well, sharing the same musical interests and goals. Three months passed as we discussed music, the album, the band and it's possible involvement with Virgin. After that Tony flew us to Los Angeles and sat us down and offered Moth a deal..We accepted, but members Greg Slone (drums), who had just bought a home and Zach Mechlem (bass) were unhappy with the deal and eventually left the band. Moth went into the studio in Los Angeles in the winter of 2000 to record and finished Provisions, Fiction and Gear in March 2001.

— Brad Stenz

While playing with Guns N' Roses, Tommy Stinson found out that GnR producer Sean Beavan was producing for Moth. Tommy showed interest in the project, and he and Josh Freese joined to play bass and drums with the band. After recording the album, Stinson and Freese were replaced by Theodore Liscinski and Adam Willard. Provisions, Fiction and Gear was recorded at Alpha Studios and released on April 9, 2002. "I See Sound" was released as the first single and was featured on Project Gotham Racing 2.

But when EMI/Virgin dropped pop diva Mariah Carey, the resulting financial fallout from her hefty signing and $28 million "severance" forced EMI to restructure. The company let go of employees and, according to Gayol, "everyone but the multi-platinum artists and artists who sold gold." Provisions, Fiction and Gear had just been released, selling only 10,000 to 15,000 units.

=== Drop Deaf (2003–2004) ===
After the break with Virgin, and with two of their band members in Los Angeles, Stenz and guitarist Bob Gayol wanted to keep their music going and enlisted a new rhythm section—a two- or three-month process. The band was rounded out with Bill Buzick on bass and Kevin Hogle on drums, and they played live shows to test the new sound. Things went smoothly as the band began to record the new album and establish its own label, Vital Records America.

The label was more about distribution than entrepreneurship. "I really didn't care one way or another whether there was a proper label on the record, but there's been discussion about doing distribution across the pond, and the (distribution) company in England only works with labels, so we had to put it on there", Stenz explained.

Drop Deaf was self-produced, and independently released in 2004 through a few online outlets and the band's website. Despite its limited release, it found some airplay courtesy of ex-Sex Pistol Steve Jones during his "Jonesy's Jukebox" show in Los Angeles' Indie 103.1 radio show. Initial tracking took place at local studio, Group Effort, with longtime band ally, Jeff Monroe, while the remainder of the tracks were recorded at Stenz's home-based Studio Red. Stenz assumed responsibility for Drop Deaf's production chores and confesses it was "extremely stressful". While preparing for a tour with drummer Atom Willard and bassist Ted Liscinski, Gayol videotaped rehearsals and catalogued a number of possible ideas for future use. Some of the songs were originally created as a commission for Stenz to write material for the new Kelly Osbourne record. He came up with five tracks and sent them off, but Osbourne didn't use them.

The band toured the UK supported by UK band Tortilla Army to promote the album and headlined the Create Music Festival in Ashford, Kent, UK.

=== Immune to Gravity and break-up (2004–2007) ===
Brad's friendship with former A&R exec Todd Sullivan became the catalyst for the next chapter of Moth's lifespan. Brad continued to send songs to Sullivan after the band's departure from Virgin and in spring of 2004, Sullivan headed out to Cincinnati for a look at the new Moth lineup with Kevin Hogle on drums, Eli White on bass, and Eric Diedrichs on guitar. Liking what he witnessed at a downtown festival, Sullivan asked Moth to be the first band signed to his new label, Hey Domingo!.

In 2005, they won the live act of the year at the Cincinnati Entertainment Awards and were the featured artist on MySpace in November. Immune to Gravity was recorded at The Mouse House in Altadena, California and released nationally on March 26, 2006. The song "Perfect" features backing vocals from Inara George. "Are You Really For Real?" was recorded during the Immune to Gravity sessions, but was cut from the album.

On June 13, 2006, Stenz created a secret MySpace page under the fictitious band name "Martian Teardrops", uploading several demos for the next album. It contained songs such as "Moth to a Flame" and "Poor Pilot", which became standards in their live set.

In September 2006, Moth performed from the balcony of the Contemporary Arts Center for the MidPoint Music Festival. On October 3, 2006, Stenz announced the new album was expected to be released around spring of 2007. Bassist Eli White left the band to return to college and was replaced by Ryan Malott, lead singer of 500 Miles to Memphis. Stenz ceased working on the new album and went to college to become a pharmacist and Kevin Hogle joined 500 Miles to Memphis.

=== Post break-up (2008–present) ===
In August 2008, Stenz became the bassist for Cari Clara and The Turnbull AC's.

On October 18, 2008, Moth played at the American Sign Museum with Eli White on bass.

In March 2009, Stenz formed a cover band with Scott Cunningham, Mike Landis, and Brett Davis called Cover Model. Greg Slone (former MOTH drummer) joined Cover Model in 2011.

As of summer 2013, Stenz hasn't written any new material but shows interest in returning. "Moth reunion may be in the works ... I've lost all my demos from everything I've done ... So working out new songs is a challenge." 500 Miles to Memphis are recording their fourth studio album. Eric Diedrichs' band Cari Clara recently released a new album, titled Midnight March.

Stenz has recently taken an interest in the fiber arts. He has become skilled in both cross stitch and crochet—and he says knitting will be next.

== Band members ==
Moth lineups (only official members listed)
(1989–1994)	Brad Stenz – vocals, guitar; Jason Hounshell – bass; Kevin Coleman – drums
(1994–1997)	Brad Stenz – vocals, guitar; Bob Gayol – guitar; Mike Lamping – bass; Kevin Coleman – drums
(1997–2001)	Brad Stenz – vocals, guitar; Bob Gayol – guitar; Mike Lamping – bass; Dan Allaire – drums; Zy Orange Lyn – violin; Additional personnel: Greg Slone – drums, vocals (1998–2001); Zach Mechlem – bass, vocals (1998–2001)
(2001–2003)	Brad Stenz – vocals, guitar; Bob Gayol – guitar; Theodore Liscinski – bass; Adam Willard – drums
(2003–2004)	Brad Stenz – vocals, guitar; Bob Gayol – guitar; Bill Buzeck – bass; Kevin Hogle – drums
(2004–2006)	Brad Stenz – vocals, guitar; Eric Diedrichs – guitar; Eli White – bass; Kevin Hogle – drums
(2006–2007)	Brad Stenz – vocals, guitar; Eric Diedrichs – guitar; Ryan Malott – bass; Kevin Hogle – drums

Past members

- Brad Stenz – vocals, guitar (1989–2007)
- Kevin Coleman – drums (1989–1997)
- Jason Hounshell – bass (1989–1994)
- Bob Gayol – guitar (1994–2003)
- Mike Lamping – bass (1994–1998)
- Zy Orange Lyn – violin (1996–1998)
- Dan Allaire – drums (1997–1998)
- Greg Slone – drums, vocals (1998–2001)
- Theodore Liscinski – bass (2001–2003)
- Adam Willard – drums (2001–2003)
- Kevin Hogle – drums (2003–2007)
- Bill Buzeck – bass (2003–2004)
- Eric Diedrichs – guitar (2004–2007)
- Eli White – bass (2004–2006)
- Ryan Malott – bass (2006–2007)

Session and touring musicians

- Greg Slone – drums (1998–2001)
- Zach Mechlem – bass (1998–2001)
- Tommy Stinson – bass (2000–2001)
- Josh Freese – drums (2000–2001)
- Evan Brass – guitar (2004 UK tour)

== Discography ==
=== Studio albums ===
Year	Title	Label	Format	U.S. Chart Position
1991	Moth	Holographic Records	Cassette	
1996	Big League Fantasy Camp	Wonder Boy	CD	
2002	Provisions, Fiction and Gear	Virgin Records	CD	No. 23 (CMJ Radio 200)
2004	Drop Deaf	Vital America	CD	
2006	Immune to Gravity	Hey Domingo!	CD	

=== EPs ===
Year	Title	Label	Format	U.S. Chart Position
2001	Like a Butterfly 'cept Different	Virgin Records	CD	No. 12 (CMJ Radio 200)

=== Splits ===
Year	Title	Label	Format	Songs
1995	The Lunar Chronicles Vol. 1	Wonder Boy	7"	"Waste the Day" and "Kill to Help"

=== Compilation appearances ===
Year	Title	Song
1995	Deary Me Records: Cincinnati Music Vol. 1	"Ride"
1996	Deary Me Records: Cincinnati Music Vol. 2	"Psychomotor"
1997	Deary Me Records: Cincinnati Music Vol. 3	"Choker"
2004	Midpoint Music Festival Compilation	"Constantly On"
2006	Emily the Strange: Strange Music for Strange People Vol. 1	"Revolution"
2006	Marlboro Compilation: Uncover the Rock	"Sticks and Stones"
2007	Backwash Sessions: 3.15.07 The Return!	"Sticks and Stones"

== Videography ==
=== Music videos ===
Year	Title	Album	Other information
2002	"I See Sound"	Provisions, Fiction and Gear	Directed by Mike Piscitelli and filmed in Hollywood
2002	"Hearing Things"	Provisions, Fiction and Gear	Shot for 16x9 & Virgin Records at Power Play's Studio A
2006	"Revolution"	Immune to Gravity	Directed by Paul Grundy and filmed at Jillian's in Covington, Kentucky

=== Video releases ===
Year	Title	Label	Format	Content
2002	Moth	Virgin Records	DVD	Live performances and "I See Sound" music video
