= Shutdown.exe (album) =

<shutdown.exe>

Studio album by 3Teeth
- Released: May 19, 2017
- Genre: Industrial metal; industrial; industrial rock; nu metal
- Length: 49:38
- Label: OMF Records
- Producer: 3Teeth

3Teeth chronology
3Teeth (2014)	<shutdown.exe> (2017)	Metawar (2019)

Singles from <shutdown.exe>
- 1. "Degrade" Released: June 2016; 2. "Atrophy" Released: August 2016; 3. "Shutdown" Released: April 19, 2017; 4. "Away from Me" Released: May 2017

<shutdown.exe> (stylized as <shutdown.ɘxe>) is the second studio album by the American industrial metal band 3Teeth. It was released on May 19, 2017, through the band's own independent label, OMF Records, under exclusive license to Cleopatra Records.

== Background ==
Initial work on the album began in 2015 when "Sell Your Face" and "Slavegod" were released online. The band originally intended to spend late 2015 and early 2016 working on the album in earnest but writing was set aside when the band was hand-selected as the opener's for Tool's 2016 North American tour.

== Release and promotion ==
The first official single, "Degrade", was released in June 2016. Vocalist Alexis Mincolla described the upcoming album concept as centering on "shutting down consensus reality tunnels" and gave a tentative release date of fall 2016. The second single, "Atrophy", was released in August 2016 alongside an official music video for the track.

While the debut album had been mixed by the band themselves, veteran producer Sean Beavan, whose industrial credits include The Downward Spiral by Nine Inch Nails and Antichrist Superstar by Marilyn Manson, was brought in to mix the new album. The album title, artwork, release date, and track listing were officially announced in March 2017. Of the tracks previously released online, "Slavegod" would be included on the release but "Sell Your Face" did not meet the album concept and was left as an online-only track.

"Shutdown" was released as a new single and music video on April 19, 2017, one month ahead of the album's release. One week before the new album's debut, "Away from Me" was released as the final single and music video to promote <shutdown.exe>.

Critical reception to the album was quite positive, with critics noting that the production and craft had improved greatly since the self-titled debut. The album peaked at number 23 on the Billboard charts in June 2017 and was listed as one of the best industrial albums of the year.

3Teeth supported the album with an extensive spring and summer North American tour which saw them expand to a touring five-piece with the addition of live drummer Andrew Melendez. The tour included multiple dates opening for Rammstein on their limited U.S. tour. Justin Hanson replaced Andrew Melendez as the live drummer later in 2017, and the band would later support Danzig for three fall 2017 dates, in addition to opening for HIM on their farewell tour.

== Critical reception ==
Professional ratings
Review scores
Source	Rating
AllMusic	4.5/5 stars
Metal Hammer	3.5/5 stars
New Noise Magazine	1.5/5 stars
Sputnikmusic	4/5 stars

Neil Z. Yeung of AllMusic stated that the album "expands the band's sonic canvas to full cinematic scope, creating a brutal and unforgiving post-apocalyptic landscape that...borrows...Nine Inch Nails, Marilyn Manson, Rammstein, and White Zombie." Dannii Leivers writing for Metal Hammer felt that the album's opener, "Divine Weapon", "[makes it clear] that this is a much heavier beast [than their debut]." According to Simon K. of Sputnikmusic, "With the album’s relevant subject matter, punishing production and excellent songwriting, this is likely to be one of the year's best industrial albums, but for anyone looking for that reinvention, you’ll only be half satisfied with the results.

== Track listing ==
All tracks are written by 3Teeth.

No.	Title	Length
1.	"Divine Weapon"	3:59
2.	"Pit of Fire"	4:14
3.	"Atrophy"	3:36
4.	"Oblivion Coil"	3:07
5.	"Shutdown"	3:46
6.	"Degrade"	3:30
7.	"Tower of Disease"	3:38
8.	"Tabula Umbra"	2:44
9.	"Voiceless"	3:52
10.	"Slavegod"	4:58
11.	"Insubstantia"	4:02
12.	"B.O.A."	3:41
13.	"Away from Me"	4:31
Total length:		49:38

Note: "Degrade" and "Tabula Umbra" were omitted from the vinyl release due to space restrictions.

== Personnel ==
3Teeth

- Alexis Mincolla – vocals, lyrics
- Xavier Swafford – synths, drums, programming, editing
- Chase Brawner – guitars, synths, drums, programming
- Andrew Means – synths, drums

Additional personnel

- Kanga – additional vocals
- Yöri Bjártsdöttir – additional vocals
- Jona Angeles – artwork
- Alexis Mincolla – graphic design

Production

- Xavier Swafford – engineering
- Sean Beavan – mixing
- Howie Weinberg – mastering
