= Steve Foley (drummer) =

American musician (1959–2008)

- Born: June 4, 1959
- Died: August 23, 2008 (aged 49) Minneapolis, Minnesota, U.S.
- Genre: Rock
- Occupation: Drummer
- Years active: 1979–2008
- Formerly of: The Replacements, Curtiss A, Bash & Pop

Stephen B. Foley (June 4, 1959 – August 23, 2008) was an American drummer who played for Curtiss A, Things That Fall Down, the Replacements, Bash & Pop, Wheelo, and several other bands in Minneapolis, Minnesota. He played live for the most part, but he recorded with songwriter Peter Lack, and he appears in a Replacements video, "When It Began," which received two 1991 MTV Video Music Awards nominations.

Foley replaced founding member Chris Mars and toured Europe and the United States with the Replacements in support of their final album, All Shook Down, and played in their final show (prior to a reunion in 2013), which took place on July 4, 1991, in Chicago's Grant Park.

== Minneapolis bands ==
Foley grew up in the Hopkins, Minnesota, area with six siblings who were all interested in music. He played for the Overtones and Things That Fall Down, who were among the favorites of Kevin Cole (then of First Avenue), and with the Suprees, Snaps, Routine 11, Bang Zoom and Trailer Trash. Foley was a drummer for Curtiss A for ten years, when he most likely did not record on Twin/Tone Records.

== The Replacements ==
Two members of Curtiss A bands replaced two members of the Replacements. Bob Dunlap, now known as "Slim," replaced guitarist Bob Stinson, who was fired in 1986 after the tour for Tim and died at age 35 in 1995. Foley replaced drummer and painter Chris Mars, who left the band in 1990.

Westerberg and Tommy Stinson went out looking for a drummer in 1990, decided on Foley, who was willing, and asked him to drive them all to an audition. They skipped the audition, which became their first practice together when their just-released album All Shook Down happened to be in his car's CD player—loudly when Foley turned on the ignition. The band as well as observers knew at the time that it was self-destructing.

Foley first played with the Replacements publicly for First Avenue's twentieth anniversary. After seeing him play with this band at the Orpheum Theatre, his father finally decided that Foley was a professional musician. Starting in January 1991, the Replacements toured Europe for Warner Bros.' Sire Records for All Shook Down as the opening act for Elvis Costello. But their review in New York was poor and they broke up, perhaps because Westerberg was in pursuit of a solo career, or they just quit.

At number 69 (Don't Tell a Soul reached 57) on the Billboard 200, All Shook Down was the Replacements' second-best-selling album. It received four stars from Rolling Stone, who called the Replacements "America's best band". Allmusic didn't like it but gave the album four and a half stars, and, undated, appears to predict the band's breakup.

Early on, the Replacements refused to make videos but later made commercial videos for Sire and MTV. Approximately at the time of Foley's tenure, "Merry-Go-Round" with a supporting video with Mars on drums reached number 1, "When It Began" with a clay animation video with Foley on drums reached number 4, and "Someone Take the Wheel" reached 15 on Billboard's Modern Rock Tracks.

When Warner's Rhino released four early Replacements albums from Twin/Tone in April 2008, Stinson and Westerberg discussed a reunion in Billboard. Westerberg was in favor of waiting for the reissues of the four Sire albums later that year. Which drummer they had in mind might be unknown. Stinson had praised Foley's work, which was on beat rather than behind it like Mars. Westerberg was impressed initially that Foley knew so much of the Replacements' material but also criticized him as he did most of his bandmates. Josh Freese played drums and Mars contributed backup vocals but not drums on a Rhino compilation in 2005. Practice in October 2008 was with Michael Bland.

== Later years ==
After the Replacements disbanded, Foley joined his brother Kevin in Tommy Stinson's new group, Bash & Pop, which released one album, Friday Night Is Killing Me (1993). In 1997 Foley recorded Something Wonderful with Peter Lack in the band 69, later known as Wheelo.

Foley married in 2007 and lived in south Minneapolis. His across-the-street neighbor was Chris Mars; they both owned BMW motorcycles. Wheelo reassembled in late 2007 and practiced throughout 2008; according to a bandmate, "Steve's last cymbal crash came down during a raucous, frenzied, and ridiculously silly jam in the key of 'b'." Foley had been sober for 15 years, but he had been medicated for depression and anxiety. He died in August 2008 at age 49 from an accidental overdose of prescription medication. Foley is buried at Lakewood Cemetery in Minneapolis.
