= Village Gorilla Head =

Studio album by Tommy Stinson
- Released: July 27, 2004
- Recorded: April 2003-March 2004
- Studio: Hollywood Sound using Frank Black mobile recording studio.
- Genre: Pop rock, hard rock
- Length: 42:15
- Label: Sanctuary
- Producer: Tommy Stinson, Philip Broussard

Tommy Stinson chronology
Village Gorilla Head (2004)	One Man Mutiny (2011)

Village Gorilla Head is the debut album by Guns N' Roses and Replacements bassist Tommy Stinson released on July 27, 2004 through Sanctuary Records. The album featured contributions by Stinson's Guns N' Roses bandmates Richard Fortus and Dizzy Reed, Dave Philips and Gersh of his previous band Perfect as well as former bandmate Josh Freese and his brother Jason.

== Background and recording ==
Initially, Stinson began writing and recording songs at his home studio in the late 1990s without the intention of making a record. Frank Black, of the Pixies, gave Stinson the use of his mobile recording studio and his studio space for free. For the album recording, Stinson brought in producer Philip Broussard to co-produce the album.

Stinson played most of the instruments on the album, with the exception of drums, but featured contributions by Guns N' Roses bandmates Richard Fortus and Dizzy Reed, who contributed guitars and keyboards respectively, along with drummers Gersh, who played with Stinson in Perfect, and Josh Freese, who was also previously a member of Guns N' Roses, as well as Josh's brother Jason, who provided saxophone, and Dave Philips, also of Perfect, providing guitar and pedal steel.

== Touring ==
For the tour supporting the album, Stinson enlisted Alien Crime Syndicate to not only be his support act during the tour, but also his backing band during the shows:

'I've been a fan of Joe's music since I met him almost ten years ago. I heard the demos as he was going in to make ACS a band. They can sing and they're a really good rock band and all that stuff. They were really into it and they have their own van and trailer, which made it all the more appealing. So far we haven't had a bad gig yet. Which has been totally awesome.'

Previously, rock group The Figgs supported Stinson, prior to the records release, however "it logistically wouldn't work out with The Figgs."

== Critical reception ==
Professional ratings
Review scores
Source	Rating
Allmusic	3.5/5 stars
Rolling Stone	3/5 stars
Blender	3/5 stars
The Guardian	3/5 stars
Answers.com	3/5 stars

Initial critical response to Village Gorilla Head was mainly positive. Mark Deming, of Allmusic, gave the album 3.5 stars out of 5 stating "There's just enough good stuff on Village Gorilla Head to remind listeners of the scruffy kid with the flawless rock instincts they knew as Tommy Stinson, but at the same time there's a bunch of stuff suggesting that maturity and a more serious outlook are taking a toll upon him." John D. Luerssen, of Rolling Stone, gave the album 3 stars stating "Stinson's first real solo disc is a stunning achievement" and "No matter that Village took five years to build, these are concise, consistently great songs that suddenly find Stinson in the same league with players like Ryan Adams and Josh Rouse." RJ Smith, of Blender, described the album as "full of loud and introspective pop shaped into bittersweet songs that evoke Big Star and Cheap Trick."

== Track listing ==
No.	Title	Length
1.	"Without a View"	4:13
2.	"Not a Moment Too Soon" (featuring Richard Fortus and Josh Freese)	4:25
3.	"Something's Wrong" (featuring Dizzy Reed)	3:21
4.	"Couldn't Wait" (featuring Josh Freese)	2:31
5.	"OK"	3:32
6.	"Bite Your Tongue"	2:32
7.	"Village Gorilla Head" (featuring Richard Fortus, Dizzy Reed and Josh Freese)	3:37
8.	"Light of Day" (featuring Richard Fortus)	4:57
9.	"Hey You"	5:23
10.	"Motivation" (featuring Richard Fortus and Josh Freese)	3:31
11.	"Someday"	4:04

== Personnel ==
Recording

- Tommy Stinson – vocals, bass, guitar, piano, keyboards, drums on "OK"
- Richard Fortus – guitar on "Not a Moment Too Soon", "Light of Day" and "Motivation", cello on "Village Gorilla Head" and "Motivation"
- Gersh – drums on Tracks 1, 3, 5 - 9, 11
- Dizzy Reed – piano, keyboards on "Something's Wrong" and "Village Gorilla Head"
- Josh Freese – drums on "Not a Moment Too Soon", "Couldn't Wait" and "Motivation"
- David Philips – guitars on Track 3
- Jason Freese – saxophone on Tracks 3, 10

Production personnel

- Tommy Stinson – production
- Philip Broussard – production, engineering
- Sean Beavan – mixing
- Stephen Marcussen – mastering
