= Friday Night Is Killing Me =

Studio album by Bash & Pop
- Released: 1993
- Genre: Rock
- Label: Sire/Reprise
- Producer: Don Smith

Bash & Pop chronology
| Friday Night Is Killing Me (1993) | Anything Could Happen (2017) |

Friday Night Is Killing Me is the first album by the American rock band Bash & Pop, released in 1993. It was Tommy Stinson's first project after the dissolution of the Replacements. The band supported the album with a North American tour that included dates opening for the Black Crowes.

== Production ==
The album was produced by Don Smith. Stinson was unable to settle on a permanent band lineup, and ended up playing many of the instruments himself; it had already been his intention to switch from bass to guitar. Members of the Heartbreakers also contributed to the recording, although Stinson wasn't in the studio during those sessions. The album's last track, "First Steps", was originally demoed for the Replacements' Don't Tell a Soul. Stinson took voice lessons in order to improve his singing on the album; he also asked Paul Westerberg to contribute some backing vocals.

== Critical reception ==
Professional ratings
Review scores
| Source | Rating |
|---|---|
| AllMusic | 4/5 stars |
| Austin American-Statesman | 3.5/4 stars |
| Calgary Herald | B+ |
| Chicago Tribune | 2.5/4 stars |
| Robert Christgau | (2-star Honorable Mention) |
| The Indianapolis Star | 3/4 stars |
| Lincoln Journal Star | 4.5/5 stars |
| Los Angeles Times | 2.5/4 stars |
| MusicHound Rock: The Essential Album Guide | 3.5/5 stars |
| Orlando Sentinel | 3/5 stars |

The Chicago Tribune wrote: "Once past the ersatz Faces riffs, Stinson writes the kind of midtempo heart-wrenchers (the title track, 'Tiny Pieces') and acoustic ballads ('Nothing', 'First Steps') that came a dime a dozen to the Replacements' Paul Westerberg." The Washington Post decided that, "unlike Westerberg, Stinson doesn't show much aptitude for the change-of-pace track." Trouser Press considered that "Stinson can do a credible imitation of Rod Stewart’s lurch and rasp might be enough for a journeyman career, but Friday Night is hardly the adult achievement his alma mater primed him for." The Indianapolis Star thought that "it's something like nuclear fission—when a great band breaks apart, astonishing energy is released." The Lincoln Journal Star noted that the album "avoids the retro feel of the Black Crowes and Izzy Stradlin."

AllMusic wrote that "decades after its release, the album feels like a bit of the hangover from the '80s, a celebration of irreverent roots rock performed with an audible grin." Magnet considered it "the best batch of songs by any Replacement since 1987’s Pleased To Meet Me." The Spin Alternative Record Guide opined that it "got over on sheer bar-band enthusiasm."

== Track listing ==
| No. | Title | Length |
|---|---|---|
| 1. | "Never Aim to Please" | 4:09 |
| 2. | "Hang Ups" | 2:42 |
| 3. | "Loose Ends" | 4:09 |
| 4. | "One More Time" | 2:08 |
| 5. | "Tickled to Tears" | 3:37 |
| 6. | "Nothing" | 3:41 |
| 7. | "Fast & Hard" | 3:12 |
| 8. | "Friday Night (Is Killing Me)" | 4:39 |
| 9. | "He Means It" | 3:33 |
| 10. | "Tiny Pieces" | 4:37 |
| 11. | "First Steps" | 4:15 |
