= Provisions, Fiction and Gear =

Studio album by MOTH
- Released: April 9, 2002
- Recorded: Winter 2000–March 2001
- Genre: Alternative rock
- Length: 42:55
- Label: Virgin Records
- Producer: Sean Beavan

MOTH chronology
Like a Butterfly 'cept Different (2001)	Provisions, Fiction and Gear (2002)	Drop Deaf (2004)

Singles from Provisions, Fiction and Gear
- 1. "I See Sound" Released: 2002

Provisions, Fiction and Gear is the third album, and the first on a major label, by the American alternative rock band MOTH.

== Track listing ==
All songs written by Brad Stenz.

1. I See Sound – 3:10
2. Thinkin' Please – 3:36
3. Hearing Things – 3:17
4. Burning Down My Sanity – 4:08
5. Last Night's Dream – 3:31
6. Leftovers – 3:17
7. Lovers' Quarrel – 4:03
8. Cocaine Star – 2:39
9. Plastics Campaign – 3:18
10. Sleepy – 3:48
11. Straight Line – 4:42
12. Not Really – 3:20

== Reception ==
Professional ratings
Aggregate scores
Source	Rating
Metacritic	70/100
Review scores
Source	Rating
Pitchfork Media	(6.9/10)
Blender	3/5 stars
Allmusic	3/5 stars

The album received enthusiastic reviews from music magazines including Rolling Stone, Alternative Press and CMJ.

== Credits ==
- Brad Stenz – vocals, guitar
- Bob Gayol – guitar
- Tommy Stinson – bass guitar
- Josh Freese – drums
