= 3Teeth (album) =

Studio album by 3Teeth
- Released: June 3, 2014
- Genres: Industrial; industrial rock; industrial metal; EBM
- Length: 49:01
- Label: Artoffact
- Producer: 3Teeth

3Teeth chronology
3Teeth (2014)	<shutdown.exe> (2017)

Professional ratings
Review scores
Source	Rating
AllMusic	3.5/5 stars
Sputnikmusic	3.5/5 stars

3Teeth is the debut studio album by the American industrial metal band 3Teeth, released in 2014 through Artoffact Records. Recording initially began in 2013 and the band spent the initial months of the writing and recording process getting to know each other's musical styles. Writing and recording took six months to complete once the band began to gel, but the initial process entailed much trial and error and half of the music which was written did not make it onto the album.

As the four were new to working together, visual arts played an important role in the creation of the music and eventually the music videos and live performance. "When you’re creating something between four people all you really have is metaphor so it helps a lot to have visual parameters to guide those metaphors and so we can point and say... “make it sound more like this or more like that.”," Mincolla said. The track 'Master of Decay' was one example, coming about after keyboard and synth player Xavier began creating sounds to a visual of Mincolla's.

While the band were passionate about the album, they were unsure how it would be received. "When we decided we were going to take six months to write an album, I knew we could create hype around it. I knew we were going to love the album, but I didn't know other people were going to be as excited about it," Mincolla said.

Upon release, the album received widespread praise, with LA Weekly comparing the band to well-known industrial artists such as Ministry, Nine Inch Nails, and Skinny Puppy. Frontman Mincolla described the inspiration for the album as "the human frailty that often defines current events". The album reached the top-10 on iTunes top albums and the band quickly expanded from their first live performance in June 2014 to performing internationally.

Two years after the album's release, 3Teeth embarked on the 2016 Tool tour after being hand-selected as openers by Tool guitarist Adam Jones. Jones had seen the band perform at The Viper Room in LA and was excited to bring the band on tour. "They are a brutal and intense entity dripping with talent on stage and I can't wait for our fans to witness the mayhem for themselves," Jones said of the band's live performance.

== Track listing ==
All tracks are written by Alexis Mincolla, Xavier Swafford, Chase Brawner and Andrew Means, except where noted.

No.	Title	Writer(s)	Length
1.	"Nihil"	Mincolla, Swafford, Means, Michael Keene	4:02
2.	"Consent"		3:01
3.	"Pearls 2 Swine"	Mincolla, Swafford, Means, Chad Collier	5:02
4.	"Dust"	Mincolla, Swafford, Brawner, Means, Yöri Bjártsdöttir	3:46
5.	"Zeit"	Swafford, Brawner, Means	0:40
6.	"Master of Decay"	Mincolla, Swafford, Means, Collier	4:49
7.	"Unveiled"	Mincolla, Swafford, Brawner, Means, Bjártsdöttir	3:09
8.	"Dissolve"		3:06
9.	"Eradicate"		3:15
10.	"X-Day"		3:15
11.	"Final Product"		3:08
12.	"Anti-Flux"		4:36
13.	"Chasm"		2:55
14.	"Too Far Gone"	Swafford, Brawner, Means, Terezie Kovalová	4:10
Total length:			49:01

Amazon bonus track
No.	Title	Length
15.	"Catalyst"	2:43
Total length:		51:44

== Personnel ==
3Teeth

- Alexis Mincolla – vocals, design
- Xavier Swafford – keyboards, mixing, mastering
- Chase Brawner – guitars
- Andrew Means – drums

Additional personnel

- Terezie Kovalová – cello
- Chad Collier, Michael Keene – additional guitars
- Yöri Bjártsdöttir – additional vocals
