= Jeanelle Mastema =

Mexican-American performer (born 1984)

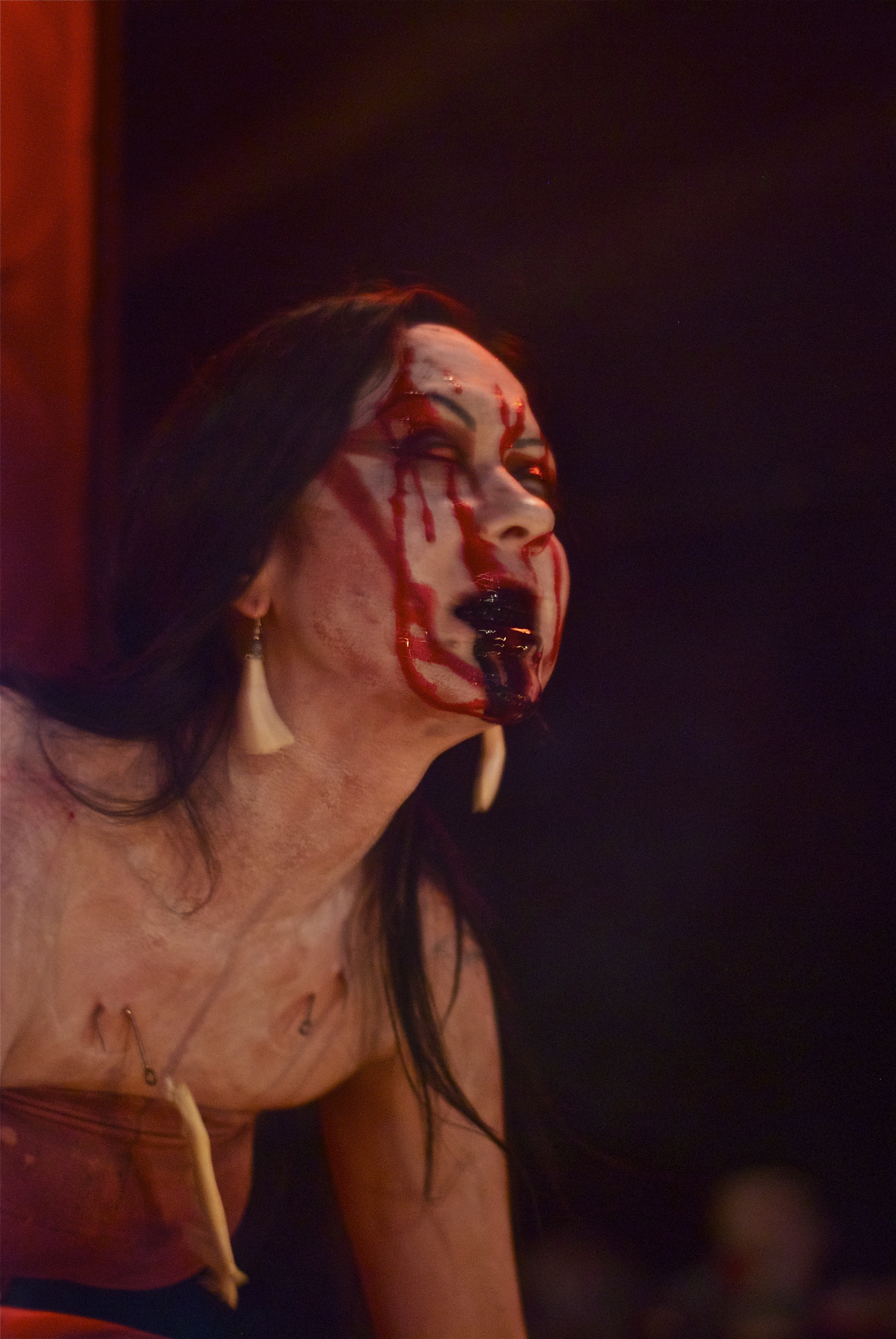
- Mastema performing in Inglewood, California in 2013
- Born: September 15, 1984 (age 41)
- Style: Experimental body and performance art

Jeanelle Mastema (born September 15, 1984) is a Mexican-American experimental body and performance artist from Boyle Heights, California. Mastema incorporates ritual into her work through play piercing, hook suspensions, live magick and sacred objects. She performs internationally, solo and in groups, often acting as a medium for group intentions or a symbolic altar for channeling energy. Through performance, Mastema enters into a meditative head space to disconnect from mundane consciousness. Her major influences include: Butoh, Kenneth Anger, Surrealism, Psychedelic Art, the Viena Actionists, Kembra Pfaher, Leonora Carrington and Alejandro Jodorowsky. She also works as the West Coast sales manager for an adult novelty toy store. She also worked at the Pleasure Chest for many years and is featured in a film called, Thank You Come Again, based on working there.

== Early life and education ==
In 2010, Mastema studied Music Technology at Los Angeles Community College. She was asked to compose a piece of music and put it to video. She decided to make an art film called 'Contatus,' which was inspired by the Viena Actionists. The word 'contatus' is related to the inertial and survival instincts all people have. In the student film Mastema puts three cheek spears in her face.

Mastema's first time solo in stage was in a show called Autumn Lights for the Omega Collective in downtown Los Angeles. The piece was part of a fashion show in which Mastema modeled Ernie Omega's designs. She pulled needles out of her face and dance as they projected her film Contatus on her body.

In the beginning of her career she went to an Aesthetic Meat Front Performance called Escape from America. In the performance people were hanging from hooks and played as human instruments. Mastema was memorized and ended up becoming good friends with the leader of the group Louis Fleischer. They bonded over their admiration of the Vienna Actionist and Mastema did her first suspension with Louis in Berlin, Germany. She became a member of Aesthetic Meat Front shortly after and did her first group performance in Poland.

== Performance art ==
=== Solo work ===
Mastema started her solo project, Virgo Rising on December 26, 2010. Elements implemented in her performance include fire, writing, psychedelic imagery through visual projection, perceived puking, live music, blood ritual, sexual objects, and urination. Common themes in her performances are rejection of religion, sacred femininity, and psychedelia.

Performance Interpretation

In 2018, Mastema performed Flesh Into Gold in Tijuana, Mexico at club called Dragon Rojo. For the show Embrace Chaos suspended Mastema from eight hooks in her stomach. While she was suspended, she cut the cords holding her up and fell on a bed of broken glass. She then pulled the hooks out of her body and created a sigil on paper. She revealed a chalice held up by her pelvic floor muscles and put the piece of paper she painted into the vessel. She lit the piece of paper on fire and put it out with urination. She concluded the performance by suspending again with two hooks in her back and swinging around.

=== Group work ===
Mastema has worked with a number of performance groups including Embrace Chaos Suspensions, Aesthetic Meat Front (AMF), Coven of Ashes, the Church of Coyote, and Constructs of Ritual Evolution (CORE).

==== Embrace Chaos Suspensions ====
Embrace Chaos Suspensions, headed by Matt Brawley, is an artist collective of suspension practitioners that provide public and private hook and rope suspensions. They also facilitate the hook suspensions for many performance art groups. They have collaborated with groups and artists such as Aesthetic Meat Front, Sheree Rose, Martin O' Brien, Virgo Rising, Coven of Ashes, Missy Munster. Embrace Chaos appears on television such shows such as Ink Master, National Geographic, Discovery Channel, and more.

Performance Interpretation

In 2018, Embrace Chaos collaborated with Sheree Rose and suspended Martin O'Brien during a performance called the Ascension. Sheree Rose is a photographer, author, performance artist, dominatrix, and was the spouse of Bob Flanagan. Bob Flanagan was a writer and performance artist living with cystic fibrosis. Sheree Rose incorporated BDSM and sadomasochism into her relationship dynamic with Bob as a tool to manage the chronic pain he experienced from cystic fibrosis. Rose documented her daily interactions with Bob through photography, video, drawings, and personal artifacts such as jewelry and sex toys. Martin O'Brien is Rose's current performance art partner since Flanagan died. O'Brien almost has cystic fibrosis. The gallery show at the Jason Vass Gallery in downtown Los Angeles featured a collection of Sheree's art and history with Flanagan including her book titled The Medicine Book. On the opening night of the gallery Rose did a live performance with Martin O' Brien, Ron Athey, and Embrace Chaos Suspensions. The piece started off with O' Brien crawling across the gallery floor as a woman wearing a latex nun costume guided him on a leash. Other women dressed as nuns showered him in small cut out pieces of paper with images of Bob Flanagan over him as he made his way into a back room behind the gallery. People gathered around on cushions on the floor behind a decorated bath tub. O' Brien is lead into the tub and the audience was asked to write an intention on a piece of paper. People poured blood on O' Brien's head and covered him in the pieces of paper they wrote on while Rose and Athey recited an homage and prayer to Flannagan. When Rose and Athey concluded their speeches Rose embraced O'Brien and cut a stylized letter S into his flesh. O' Brien is then sat down in a chair and was pierced by Jeanelle Mastema and Matt Brawley from Embrace Chaos Suspensions. They pierced live inserting two hooks in O'Brien's back and one in each forearm. His body resembled a T shape and was symbolic of a crucifixion. O' Brien swung around in the air hanging from hooks for a few minutes. As he descended to the ground he was embraced by Sheree who held him in her arms cradling him like an infant. In this performance Mastema performed as a practitioner rather than a character or symbol.

===== Aesthetic Meat Front (AMF) =====
Aesthetic Meat Front is a performance group based out of Berlin, Germany created by couture fashion designer Louis Fleischauer. Fleischauer is known for AMF Korsets, his avant-garde line of wearable art and his performance art shows. AMF's performances are often public rituals where people are turned into human instruments through piercing, springs, blood and fashion shows with people hanging from hooks wearing leather corsets with wings.

Performance Interpretation

The most noteworthy AMF performance Mastema was a part of was The Nestle Death Curse at the Lethal Amounts gallery in downtown Los Angeles. This performance was a collaboration between Aesthetic Meat Front, the Church of Coyote, and Sheree Rose. In the performance Mastema's forearms were nailed to a cross and she had hooks in her chest. The performer's bodies were the medium

===== Coven of Ashes =====
Coven of Ashes is an all femme ritual performance group based out of Los Angeles, California. The group is founded and directed by ritual performance artist and blood witch Lauren Davis. This ritualistic performance group incorporates themes such as the feral feminine, the occult, body autonomy, death and rebirth. Using their bodies as mediums, they also incorporate channeling, automatic writing, bloodletting and Ankoku Butoh.

One Coven of Ashes performance, Desecrated in Death: The Path of the Unholy, marked the release of Missy Munster's fashion line Let the Devil In. The performance featured dramatic lighting in which performers crawled onto a giant spirit board, fell into a trance state and bled from their foreheads. One blindfolded performer in the middle of the circle hung from two hooks in her back. She paced back and forth around the circle and was lifted into the air as a human pendulum. Later in the performance, Lauren Davis, playing the role of shadow demon, summons the dead. Jeanelle Mastema and Carmen Carrasco, playing the dead, hung from flesh hooks. They spun in a circle like a mobile until finally resting in their coffins. A sermon was given, while Munster was brought out, bound by rope. With the assistance of Lauren, Munster cut through her restraints and proceeded to insert a spear in her face and cut her chest with a scalpel.

===== The Church of Coyotel =====
The Church of Coyotel is a performance group headed by Steven Johnson Leyba. Leyba is a performance artist with indigenous Apache and Jewish roots, and was adorned as a minister of the Church of Satan by Anton LaVey. His work is often controversial and deals with personal political issues. Many of the Church of Coyotel's themes include anti-corporate values, reclaiming of indigenous identity, rejection and rebellion of patriarchal values, intersectional feminist ideologies and more.

Performance Interpretation

On September 15, 2018 Jeanelle Mastema performed at the Museum of Contemporary Art in Tucson, Arizona. Steven Leyba brought Mastema in as a performer and member of the Church of Coyotel. The exhibition their live performance was featured in was called Blessed Be: Mystics, Spirituality and the Occult in Contemporary Art. The performance called INVOKATION OV RECKONING: A Curse on Your Corporate Masters, A Magickal Retrospective. To begin the performance Mastema knelt on a bed of broken glass. She had pierced needles into her cheeks with peacock feathers on the ends, and she painted a diamond shape on her chin to represent the tongue of the Hindu goddess Kali. Mastema painted sigils on paper and a fellow performer bled on them. Mastema got up from the ground to reveal a chalice hanging from a vaginal weight. Mastema proceeds to burn the designs and urinate on them to extinguish the fire. Leyba recited spoken word preaching a new Avalon of creativity.

===== Constructs of Ritual Evolution (CORE) =====
Constructs of Ritual Evolution is a performance group founded by Steve Joyner. Steve Joyner is on the Association of Professional Peircers Legislative and Regulatory Affairs Chair and Committee and Board of Directors. CORE was a suspension performance group in the early two thousands.

Performance Interpretation

In 2014, CORE performed with Fakir Musafar in Dallas Texas. In the thirty minute performance Jeanelle Mastema suspended in a cross-legged position with two hook in her back and two in each leg. She spun in circles above the stage while other people performed below her. One of the performer's burdened a kavadi in which he had a cage of spears inserted into the mid-section of his body. Fakir inserted hooks into his chest and pulled against them. He then interacted with a performer named Luna who suspended from two hooks in her chest.

== Body art and performance art ==
Scholars have written about incorporating pain in performance art. In Performing Bodies in Pain, Marlo Carlson, "propose[s] that pain is unique among sensations, not because it is inexpressible or radically un-shareable, but because it creates an urgent need to communicate things which no one is eager to listen." Carlson makes the point that watching pain brings up emotions for people that are often difficult to confront. Carlson then goes on to say that, "dramatized pain typically serves as a means to get at the consciousness of the person who inhabits the body, thereby also serving as a call to action for the spectator." As the author points out pain performance art is unique, because of its visceral nature has the ability to deeply move people. This and other scholarly works may provide insight to some of Mastema's performance art.

== Live performance archive ==
Live Performances
Performance Group	Date	Performance Title	Gallery/Venue	City/ Country	Video Link	Notes	Ref
Aesthetic Meat Front (AMF)							
	2018			Tijuana, Mexico			
	2016	Symphony of Flesh	Lethal Amounts	Los Angeles, CA		Aesthetic Meat Front's 20th Anniversary Performance	
	2015	Nestle Death Curse	Lethal Amounts	Los Angeles, CA		Collaboration with Chvrch of Coyotel and AMF	
	2013	Flesh Art	Vanilla Gallery	Tokyo, Japan			
	2012	Public Ritual	Wasteland Weekend	Mojave Desert, CA			
	2009		Bulkow Castle	Poland			
		Ritual to Release Desires	Sadistic Circus	Tokyo, Japan			
Embrace Chaos Suspensions							
	September 14, 2019	Torture Garden Los Angeles	The Globe Theater	Los Angeles, CA		Jeanelle Mastema performed with Embrace Chaos suspensions at one of the most infamous fetish parties, Torture Garden. Makeup by Missy Munster.	
	2018	The Ascension-Sheree Rose & Martin O'Bien	Jason Vass Gallery	Los Angeles, CA		Performance by Sheree Rose and Martin O'Brien with Ron Athey. Suspension by Embrace Chaos Suspensions.	
	2018	Fetish and Fantasy Ball at Dom Con Los Angeles	Sanctuary Studios LAX	Los Angeles, CA			
	October 31, 2017	Disobey: ANTON LAVEY Exhibit w/ Kenneth Anger + special guests	Madame Siam	Los Angeles, CA		Suspension by Embrace Chaos and Threshold Suspensions. Mastema suspended from a pole with a chalice dildo inside of her.	
Chvrch of Coyotel							
	September 15, 2018	INVOKATION OV RECKONING: A Curse on Your Corporate Masters, A Magickal Retrospective	The Museum of Contemporary Art Tucson	Tucson, AZ		A live performance that was part of the Blessed Be: Mysticism, Spirituality, and the Occult in Contemporary Art exhibition at MOCA. Curator: Ginger Shulick Porcella	
	October 17, 2015	Death Curse of Nestle	Lethal Amounts	Los Angeles, CA		Church of Coyotel members Reverend Steven Johnson Leyba, Magus Jeanelle Mastema and Magus Hannah Haddix performed. Along with Astheic Meat front which Mastema also performed with. There was an additional performance by Sheree Rose.	
	October 7, 2011	The Code-Hex ALLMENTARIUS Curse Ritual Against Monsanto		Denver, CO		Sixteen Point Crucifixion Suspension with Fruit Cheek Speet Needles in Face	
Virgo Rising						Solo Project of Janelle Mastema	
	2018	Flesh Into Gold	Dragon, Rojo	Tijuana, Mexico			
	December 10, 2010		Show Cave	Los Angeles, CA		Debut Virgo Rising Performance Mastema had needles in her face, throat, chest, and stomach. She drew a flaming knife in front of her body and pulled the needles out to simulate as if she had bled from the knife. At the end of the piece, she falls over and 'dies.' Then the band passed out flowers to the audience as a symbol of serenity. Ace Farren Ford played live experimental noise music	
Coven of Ashes							
	2018	DESECRATED IN DEATH: The Path of The Unholy	Private Gallery	Los Angeles, CA		A show for the launch of MM Fabrications fashion line "Let the Devil In." Mastema performed a hook suspension and modeled in the show.	
	2018	"Dakhma- The Tower of Silence” at Shadowdance	Oakland Opera House	Oakland, CA			
	2018	Belle Book and Candle		Los Angeles, CA			
	2015	The Ceremony Of Black Art lV	The Black Castle	Los Angeles, CA			
	2018	Thou Art Darkest	Masonic Lodge	Los Angeles, CA		Performance for Behemoth	
	2018?	Whore of Babylon at Illumination?		Oakland, CA			
	January, 2017	Satanic Mass	Das Bunker	Los Angeles, CA			
	December 17, 2016	Lethal Amounts Christmas Party	Lethal Amounts	Los Angeles, CA			
Constructs of Ritual Evolution (CORE)							
		Puja	Lakewood Theater	Dallas, Texas		Collaboration between Fakir Musafar and CORE	
Omega Collektiv							
	2010	Autumn Lights		Los Angeles, CA		Fashion Show, Played Jeanelle's Student Film	

== Filmography ==
Film
Year	Title	Director	Part	Notes	Ref
2016	Jane's Addiction Ritual De Lo Habitual Alive at Twenty-Five 2016 Silver Spoon Anniversary Tour DVD		Herself		
2013	PAINing POORtraits	Adam Cooper-Terán and Steven Johnson Leyba	Herself	Lost Film Festival Program	
November 8, 2010	Contatus	Jeanelle Mastema	Herself	Student Film- LA Community College Mastema was in school for music technology. Her assignment was to put a piece of audio to a film. She ended up making an art film inspired by Viennese Actionism, where she put cheek spears in her face.	1

=== Television ===
TV Shows
Year	Title	Director	Part	Notes	Ref
2018	Thank You Come Again	Chelsea Steiner	Customer 2		

=== Music videos ===
Music Videos
Year	Title	Artist	Director	Notes	Ref
2020		Cadaver	Missy Munster		
2019	Lucy's Curse	Power From Hell	Marco Tombstone		
2019	EXXXIT	3Teeth	Dan Dowding (Media Pollution)	Mastema hangs from 24 hooks in her back, front, arms, forehead and throat. Suspension by Embrace Chaos Suspensions (Matt Brawley and Dahlia Datura)	Revolver Magazine KERRANG! Magazine Genre is Dead! Magazine
2018	Keroscene Dreams	Sadistik			
2018	Hyena	The Sixth Camber			
2016		The Future is Pointless	Will Rot		
2015	Human Thing	Carisa Bianca Mellado			
2011	Pure	Experiment Perilous	Marco Tombstone		

== Books and publications ==
Books/ Publications
Year	Title	Author	Notes	Ref
2014	Flesh Art	Louis Flischauer	Performance Art Photos and Art Installations	

== Additional reading ==
- Aldersey-Williams, Hugh. Anatomies : a cultural history of the human body. ISBN 9780393348842. OCLC 881832175
- Ana Finel Honigman (2014) Enabling Art, Third Text, 28:2, 177-189, DOI: 10.1080/09528822.2014.885201
- Brayshaw, Teresa (2013-10-01). "The Twentieth Century Performance Reader" doi:10.4324/9780203125236.
- Burton, Johanna, editor. Bell, Natalie,. Trigger : gender as a tool and a weapon. ISBN 9780915557165. OCLC 1011099218
- Di Bella, Maria Pia, editor. Elkins, James, 1955- (2017). Representations of pain in art and visual culture. Routledge. ISBN 1138108413. OCLC 1009067648.
- Diamond, Elin (2017), "Feminism, Assemblage, and Performance: Kara Walker in Neoliberal Times", Performance, Feminism and Affect in Neoliberal Times, Palgrave Macmillan UK, pp. 255–268, ISBN 9781137598097
- Flanagan, Bob (2017). The Book of Medicine. PrimrosePathPress. ISBN 978-1-5323-5905-7.
- Granata, Francesca, (2017). Experimental Fashion : Performance Art, Carnival and the Grotesque Body. I.B. Tauris & Co. Ltd. ISBN 9781784533793. OCLC 978979920.
- Johnson, Dominic (2013). Pleading in the blood : the art and performances of Ron Athey. Bristol, UK: Intellect. ISBN 1783200359, 9781783200351
- Lattin, Don; Writer, Chronicle Religion (1997-05-08). "Davis Party Performer Says He's Satanic Priest". SFGate. Retrieved 2019-03-11.
- Lea., Vergine, (2007). Body art and performance : the body as language. Skira Editore. ISBN 8881186535. OCLC 231021228.
- Leyba, Steven Johnson (2015). Coyote Satan Amerika: The Unspeakable Art and Performances of Reverend Steven Johnson Leyba. Last Gasp. ISBN 0867195053.
- Leyba, Steven Johnson (2008). The Coyotel Way. Coyotel Press. ISBN 0982173512.
- Logan, Barbara Ellen (2011). "Performing Bodies in Pain: Medieval and Post-Modern Martyrs, Mystics, and Artists (review)". Comparative Drama. 45 (3): 303–306. doi:10.1353/cdr.2011.0016. ISSN 1936-1637
- Metzger, Jane. Sean A Shanks, Gwyneth (2016-01-01). Performing the Museum: Displaying Gender and Archiving Labor, from Performance Art to Theater. eScholarship, University of California. OCLC 1078235377
- Musafar, Fakir (2015). SPIRIT AND FLESH. Arena Editions. ISBN 189204157X.
- Oliver, Sophie Anne. (2010) "Trauma, bodies, and performance art: Towards an embodied ethics of seeing," Continuum, 24:1, 119-129, DOI: 10.1080/10304310903362775
- Paffrath, James (1984). Obsolete Body / Suspensions / Stelarc. JP Publications;. ISBN 0910703000
- Petra., Kuppers, (2007). The scar of visibility : medical performances and contemporary art. University of Minnesota Press. ISBN 9780816697687. OCLC 182857333.
- Phelan, Peggy. (2012). Live art in LA : performance in Southern California, 1970-1983. Routledge. ISBN 9780415684224. OCLC 876441952
- "Extended-Body: Interview with Stelarc". web.stanford.edu. Retrieved 2019-03-11.
- "Radical Women: Latin American Art, 1960–1985". Panorama.2018. doi:10.24926/24716839.1653. ISSN 2471-6839.
- Regan, Margaret. "Art From the Dark Side". Tucson Weekly. Retrieved 2019-03-11.
- Rothstein, Adam (2015-10-26). "Meet the Artists/Occultists Channeling the Death of Monsanto". Creators. Retrieved 2019-03-11.
- Santana, Analola (2018). Freak performances : dissidence in Latin American theater. Michigan: Ann Arbor : University of Michigan Press. ISBN 9780472073917
