= Tommy Stinson =

American musician

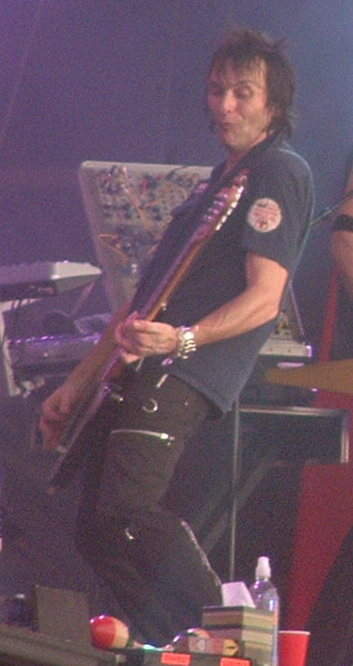
- Stinson live with Guns N' Roses in 2006

Background information
- Born: Thomas Eugene Stinson; October 6, 1966 (age 59); Minneapolis, Minnesota, U.S.
- Genres: Alternative rock; punk rock; pop rock; heavy metal; hard rock
- Occupations: Musician; songwriter
- Instruments: Bass guitar; vocals; guitar
- Years active: 1979–present
- Labels: Done to Death Music; Twin/Tone; Sire; Reprise; Warner Bros.; Medium Cool; Restless; Rykodisc; Sanctuary; Legacy; Interscope; Geffen
- Member of: Bash & Pop, Cowboys in the Campfire
- Formerly of: The Replacements; Guns N' Roses; Perfect; Soul Asylum; Alien Crime Syndicate; The Figgs; Pocatello
- Website: tommystinson.com

Thomas Eugene Stinson (born October 6, 1966) is an American rock musician. He came to prominence in the 1980s as the bass guitarist for The Replacements, one of the definitive American alternative rock groups. After their breakup in 1991, Stinson formed Bash & Pop, acting as lead vocalist, guitarist and frontman. In the mid-1990s he was the singer and guitarist for the rock band Perfect, and eventually joined the hard rock band Guns N' Roses in 1998.

Stinson released his debut solo album, Village Gorilla Head in 2004 and subsequently joined Soul Asylum for the completion of their album The Silver Lining, and was a member of the band for the album's tour in 2006 before joining them as a permanent member until 2011. He released his second solo album, critically acclaimed One Man Mutiny, on his own Done To Death Music label in 2011.

Stinson left Guns N' Roses in 2014 upon original bassist Duff McKagan's return to the band. In 2016 he reunited Bash & Pop, and released a new album in 2017, titled Anything Could Happen.

== Career ==
=== The Replacements (1979–1991, 2012–2015) ===
After beginning to learn the bass at the age of 11, Stinson began playing and covering songs with his half-brother, Bob Stinson, and drummer Chris Mars under the name "Dogbreath" without a singer. After recruiting singer Paul Westerberg, Dogbreath changed their name to The Impediments and played a drunken performance, without Stinson, at a church hall gig in June 1980. After being banned from the venue for disorderly behavior, they changed their name to The Replacements.

After signing to Twin/Tone Records, by label owner Peter Jesperson who also became the group's manager, they released their debut album, Sorry Ma, Forgot to Take Out the Trash, in 1981 with an EP, Stink, following in 1982. The Replacements began to distance themselves from the hardcore punk scene after the release of Stink and, inspired by other rock subgenres, released their second album, Hootenanny, in April 1983. Hootenanny was played on over two hundred radio stations across the country, with critics acclaiming the album; The Village Voice's Robert Christgau deemed it "the most critically independent album of 1983". The band embarked on their first tour of the U.S. in April 1983, during this time Stinson dropped out of tenth grade to join the rest of the band on tour. The band toured cities such as Detroit, Cleveland and Philadelphia, but their intended destination was New York City, where they played at Gerde's Folk City and Maxwell's.

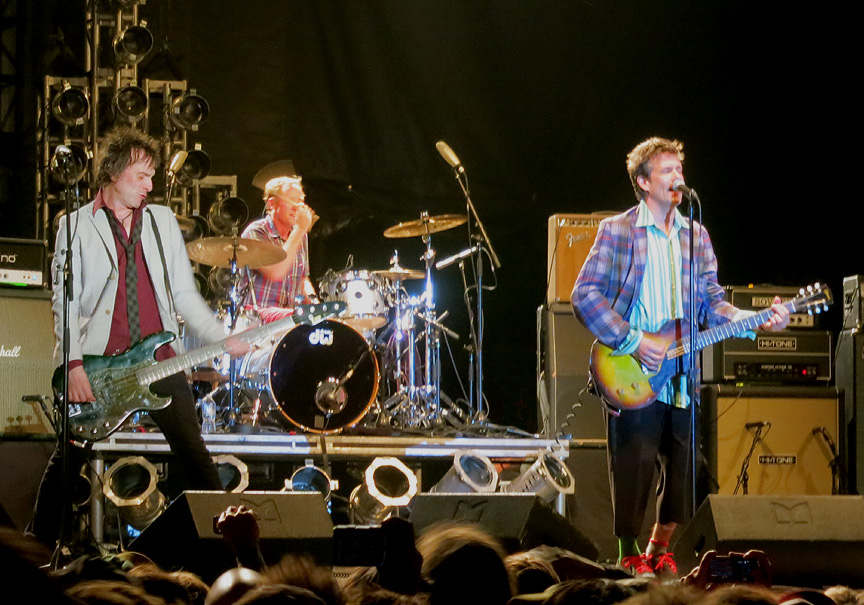
Stinson (left) playing with the Replacements in 2012.

For the recording of their next studio album, The Replacements decided to return to Blackberry Way Studios in late 1983 with the result being Let It Be, released in October 1984. A live album, The Shit Hits the Fans, was released in 1985.

Warner Bros. Records subsidiary Sire Records, eventually signed The Replacements with their first major-label release being the Tim album, produced by Tommy Erdelyi, released in 1985. After the release of Tim, The Replacements fired Tommy's brother, Bob Stinson, as well as Jesperson the same year. The remaining Replacements carried on as a trio for Pleased to Meet Me, released in 1987, recorded in Memphis with producer Jim Dickinson. Guitarist Slim Dunlap took over lead guitar duties for the subsequent tour and soon became a full member of the band.

They released Don't Tell a Soul, in 1989, which featured the song "I'll Be You", which topped Billboard's Modern Rock chart. Following a disastrous tour opening for Tom Petty and the Heartbreakers, Westerberg recorded a new album largely with session musicians but was persuaded to release it as a Replacements album. All Shook Down, released in 1990, won critical praise and more mainstream attention, though the many guest players and Mars's quick departure from the band following the album's release led many to wonder about the band's future.

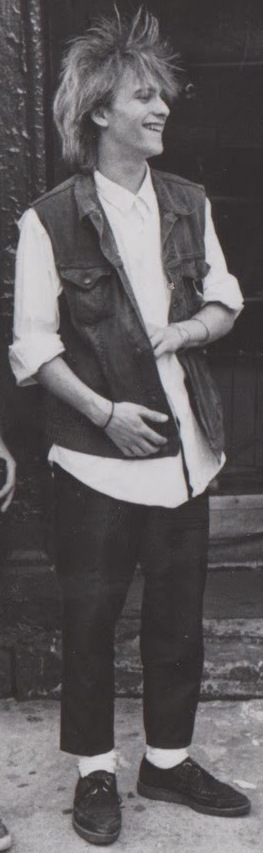
Stinson in 1984

Drummer Steve Foley was recruited as Mars's replacement in 1990, and the band embarked on a long farewell tour which lasted into the summer of 1991. On July 4, 1991, the band officially broke up following a Taste of Chicago performance in Grant Park, referred to by fans as "It Ain't Over 'Til the Fat Roadie Plays" because each member disappeared during the set, their respective roadies taking their places. This show was broadcast by Chicago radio station WXRT.

In December 2005, he reunited with his surviving Replacements bandmates Paul Westerberg and original drummer Chris Mars to record two new songs for a greatest-hits collection. Stinson further collaborated with Westerberg on the soundtrack to the Sony feature film Open Season, recording bass tracks for 'Love You in the Fall' and 'Right to Arm Bears'.

On September 20, 2012, Stinson and Westerberg recorded "Busted Up" as part of the "Songs For Slim" vinyl series. The project was created to raise money for guitarist Slim Dunlap after he suffered a massive stroke in February 2012. They recorded three additional songs, released as the "Songs For Slim EP", the band's first release of all newly recorded music since "All Shook Down". A subsequent eBay auction of a special edition 10" version of the EP, limited to 250, raised over $106,000 for Slim's care.

The band reunited in 2013 to play their first live show in 22 years at Riot Fest in Chicago. Former Guns N' Roses bandmate Josh Freese joined Stinson as part of The Replacements for the tour. After a tour that lasted through 2015, the Replacements broke up again, with Stinson stating that any material written would be reworked for his solo career.

=== Bash and Pop (1992–1994) ===
With a name selected from a contest hosted by New York radio station WDRE, Stinson, on guitar and lead vocals, formed his first post-Replacements group Bash & Pop in 1992 with drummer Steve Foley being added to the group, also formerly of The Replacements, along with his brother Kevin on bass and guitarist Steve Brantseg. Rumors were that Bash & Pop were a band in name only with Stinson recording the album, Friday Night Is Killing Me, mostly by himself along with a number of guest musicians. Steve, Kevin and Brantseg all contributed to the album, Friday Night Is Killing Me, along with Tom Petty and the Heartbreakers members Benmont Tench and Mike Campbell, Wire Train's Jeff Trott as well as other musicians Greg Leisz, Brian McCloud, Phil Jones and Tommy Steel, with the album being released in January 1993, through Sire/Reprise Records, to mainly mixed reviews.

A tour in support followed along with the recording of the track "Making Me Sick" which was included on the soundtrack, released in 1994, to the movie Clerks however the group disbanded later in 1994.

=== Perfect (1995–1998) ===
Following the breakup of previous group Bash & Pop, Stinson formed Perfect along with the group's guitarist Marc Solomon, bassist Robert Cooper as well as drummer Gersh. After playing a number of shows, they were soon signed to Medium Cool Records by label head Peter Jesperson, who was also an old manager of The Replacements, where they began recording for a debut EP.

The When Squirrels Play Chicken EP, produced by Don Smith, was released in 1996 to positive reviews with Greg Prato, of Allmusic, stating "fans will undoubtedly be more pleased with his new band, Perfect, which is much more focused, and in the expected drunken-Johnny Thunders guitar-rock style."

In 1997 the group entered the studio with producer Jim Dickinson to produce their debut album, tentatively titled Seven Days a Week. Stinson had now switched back to bass for the departed Cooper, and added Dave Philips on guitar. Despite completing the album, it was shelved by Regency Pictures, who had acquired Medium Cool distributors Restless Records, which led to the group's eventual breakup in 1998. The album itself was leaked onto the internet through advance copies sent to record labels, however a remixed and resequenced version of Seven Days a Week, retitled Once, Twice, Three Times a Maybe, was released by Rykodisc in 2004. which was, much like the EP, well received.

=== Guns N' Roses (1998–2014) ===
In 1998, Stinson joined Guns N' Roses to replace Duff McKagan who quit due to creative differences and a desire to spend more time with his family. Stinson was recommended to the group by his friend Josh Freese, who was the band's drummer at the time. Stinson said he came to admire McKagan's musicianship but also added "Guns N' Roses were never my thing" during their early 1990s ascendency to stardom, and he auditioned mainly to have a chance to play with Freese. Guitarist Richard Fortus described Stinson's role as the band leader and "ultimate musical director" during rehearsals and recordings when vocalist Axl Rose was away.

Stinson's bass playing is featured prominently on the track "Oh My God", featured on the soundtrack to the movie End of Days, as well as their long-delayed Chinese Democracy album which was eventually released in 2008. Stinson played bass on 13 of 14 songs, was credited for arrangements on "Riad N' the Bedouins", performed backing vocals on "Chinese Democracy", "Better", "Street of Dreams", "There Was a Time", & "Riad N' the Bedouins". He co-wrote "Chinese Democracy", "Street of Dreams", "There Was a Time", "Catcher in the Rye", and "Riad N' the Bedouins". Stinson is also credited as co-writer on the 2021 Guns N' Roses track "Hard Skool", initially written during the Chinese Democracy sessions.

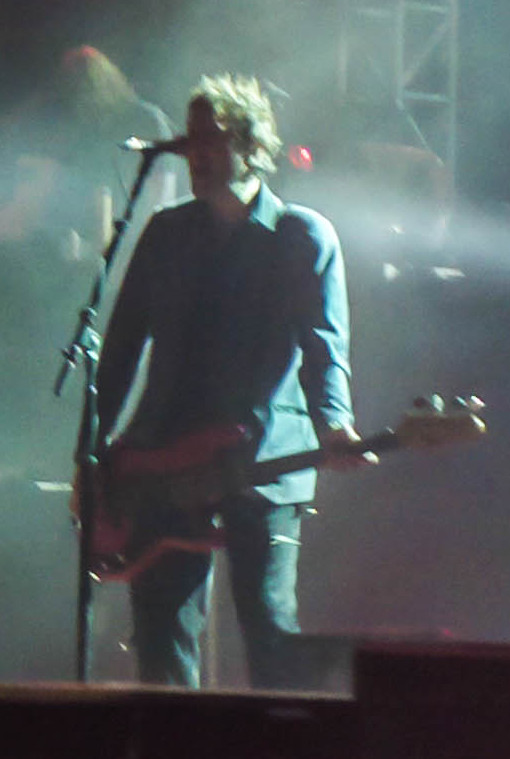
Stinson with Guns N' Roses in 2012.

On November 24, 2006, at Cleveland's Quicken Loans Arena, Axl Rose called the Eagles of Death Metal (one of Guns N' Roses' opening acts) the "Pigeons of Shit Metal." Jesse Hughes, the Eagles of Death Metal's lead singer, told NME that Stinson took his bass off and threw it on the floor saying "Fuck you, that's it" and threatened to leave the band. Stinson did not leave Guns N' Roses; however, the Eagles of Death Metal were fired from the tour. On December 2, 2006, Stinson issued a statement reading, in part: "Eagles of Death Metal were a suggestion of mine a while ago. Turns out they were the wrong band for our crowd. They were booed and did not play for as long as they were scheduled to. ... In the past I have thrown my bass. I have never thrown it at Axl or anyone else in the band nor has anyone thrown my bass back at me... yet. Axl has been a dear friend to me for nine years. We have no problem communicating and wish that people would stay the fuck out of shit they don't know anything about."

During the Chinese Democracy World Tour, Stinson played several punk songs during his solo spot, such as "Sonic Reducer" by The Dead Boys, and "My Generation" by The Who, as well as "Motivation" from his first album, Village Gorilla Head. Stinson's performance of "Motivation" is featured on the live album, Appetite for Democracy 3D.

Stinson left the group after 2014 tour, and commented on his departure, stating "I left it in a good way. I actually had to just start turning down tours because I was unable to tour; I got into a position, personally, where my personal life was going to prevent me from doing, I don’t know — it must have been about five tours that they called me to do, and I just said I can’t do ’em." Stinson was replaced by the returning McKagan.

=== Solo career (2004–2005) ===
Stinson began writing what would become Village Gorilla Head in the late 90s, and after Frank Black, of the Pixies, gave Stinson the use of his mobile recording studio and his studio space for free he began recording in 2003 with Philip Broussard who co-produced the album.

Stinson played most of the instruments on the album, with the exception of drums, but featured contributions by Guns N' Roses bandmates Richard Fortus and Dizzy Reed, who contributed guitars and keyboards respectively, along with drummers Gersh, who played with Stinson in Perfect, and Josh Freese, who was also previously a member of Guns N' Roses, as well as Josh's brother Jason, who provided saxophone, and Dave Philips, also of Perfect, providing guitar and pedal steel. The album was released on July 27, 2004, to positive reviews from music critics.

For the tour supporting the album, Stinson enlisted Alien Crime Syndicate to be his support act during the tour as well as his backing band during the shows, as well as The Figgs on another leg.

=== Soul Asylum (2005–2012) ===
In late 2005, Stinson joined Soul Asylum for a few gigs in tribute to recently deceased bassist and founding member Karl Mueller. Stinson and Dave Pirner (founding member of Soul Asylum) were friends in high school in Minneapolis, MN. He also helped finish the rest of the recording for the album The Silver Lining released in 2006. He toured with them for a number of years when his schedule allowed for it, played on their 2012 Delayed Reaction album and was replaced permanently by Winston Roye in 2012 due to his lack of availability.

=== Return to solo career (2011–2014) ===
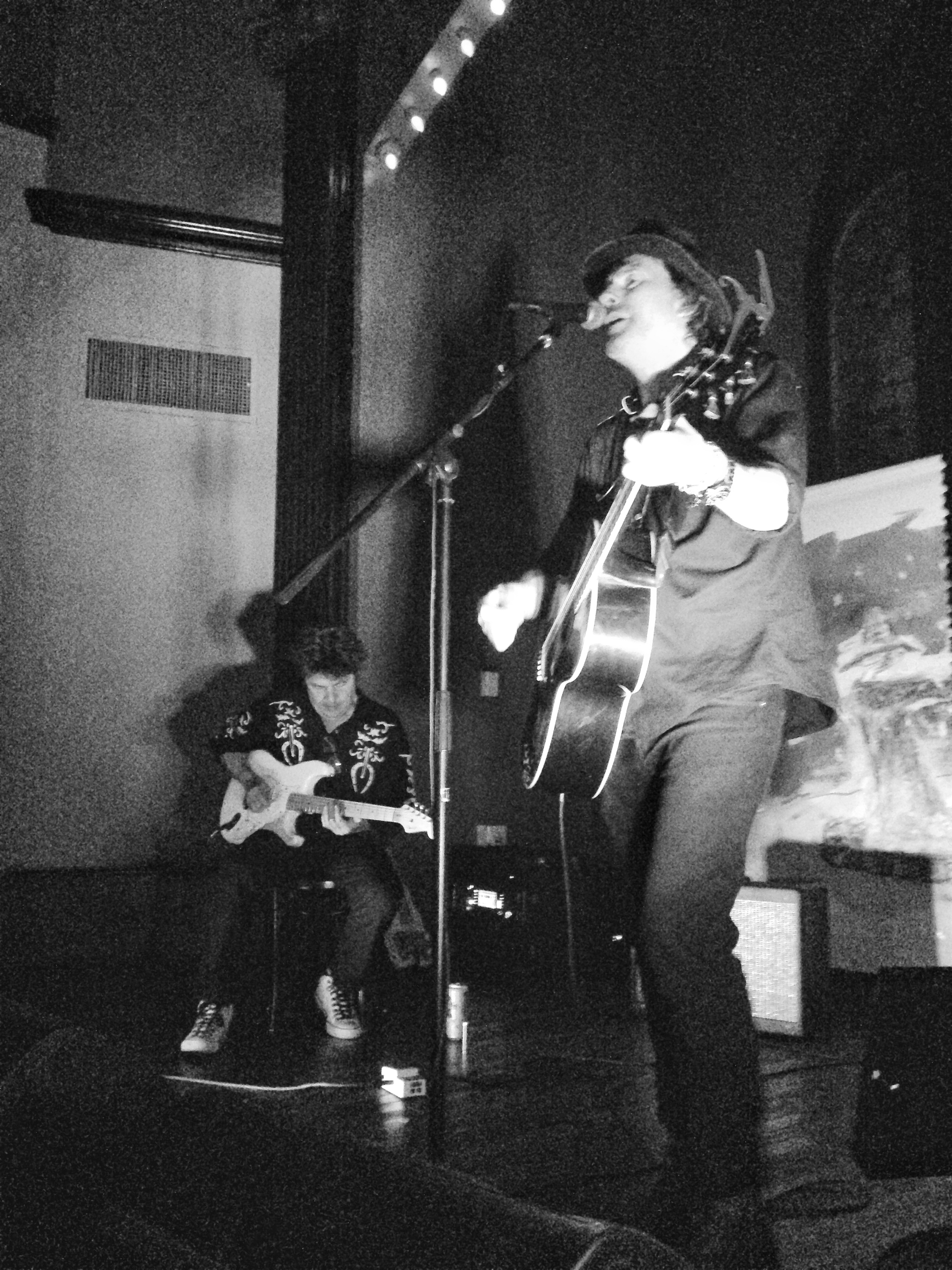
Stinson performing a solo show in 2016.

In early 2011, Stinson announced his second solo album, One Man Mutiny, was to be released on August 30, 2011. Described as his most fully realized work in both production quality and craftsmanship of song, Stinson released the album on his own Done To Death Music label and played sporadic dates across the country with Pete Donnelly and Mike Gent from The Figgs, Tim Schweiger, Justin Perkins and Jon Phillip from Limbeck.

In May 2011, Stinson played three well-attended shows in the Midwest – Club Garibaldi's in Milwaukee, First Avenue in Minneapolis and Double Door in Chicago. At First Avenue, he was surprised onstage by Dave Pirner from Soul Asylum for the encore. Pirner smashed several cheap guitars on stage before Stinson and the band played a cover of The Undertones' "Teenage Kicks" to close out the night.

Stinson and the band played eight gigs over four days at the 2012 SXSW Music Festival in Austin, Tecas, including a Daytrotter Session and a memorable set at Alejandro Escovedo's famous Closing Party at the Continental Club.

In late 2012, Stinson and Fred Armisen joined Dinosaur Jr. on stage at their You're Living All Over Me 25th anniversary show at Terminal 5 in NYC to play "TV Eye" by The Stooges during the encore.

In 2013, Stinson recorded two songs with The Old 97's, appearing on their 2014 album Most Messed Up. He shared lead guitar duties with Ken Bethea and contributed vocals on "Intervention" and "Most Messed Up."

=== Bash & Pop reunion (2016–present) ===
In 2016, after working on material for a new solo album, Stinson decided to release it under the Bash & Pop moniker, reuniting the band. An album, Anything Could Happen was released on January 20, 2017. Some of the material was also written by Stinson to be included on a possible new Replacements album that never came to fruition.

In 2016 and 2017 Bash & Pop toured North America and Europe in support of the new album.

In 2021, Stinson began a tour of intimate backyard performances fronting Cowboys in the Campfire, his duo with Pennsylvania-based guitarist Chip Roberts.

== Gear ==
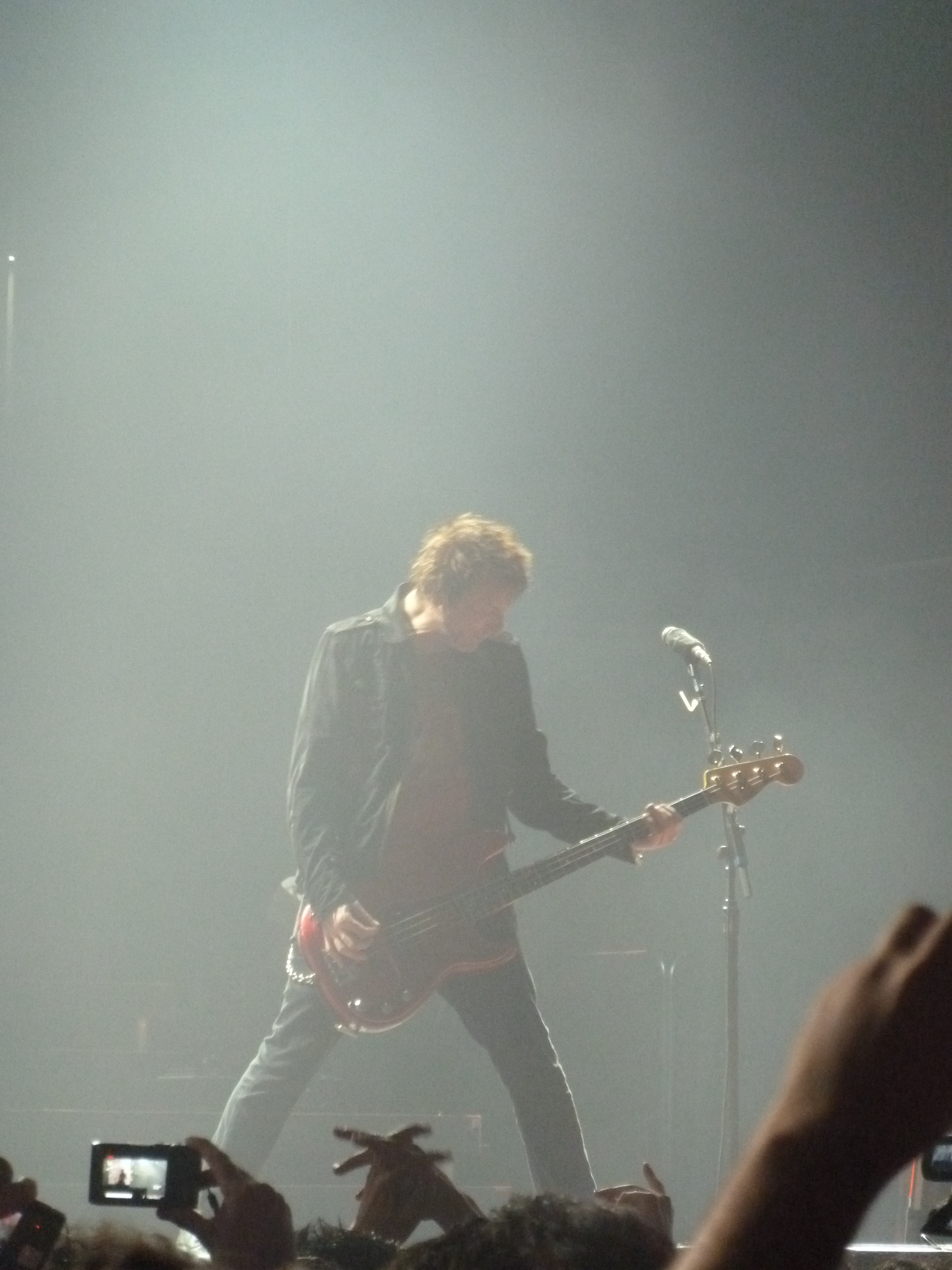
Stinson with Guns N' Roses in 2011

During his early years with The Replacements, Stinson most notably used a Rickenbacker 4001 bass. In the late 1980s, he gravitated toward the Fender Precision Bass, which would later serve as the foundation for his own signature model with ESP. For guitars, he has used a variety of Fender Telecaster models and Gibson acoustics.

On stage with Guns N' Roses, Stinson used a lineup of ESP Vintage-4 basses (with the P/J pickup configuration) in different colors, all of which were equipped with EMG PJ-Set pickups. An exception to this was the songs "Better", "Chinese Democracy" and "Sorry", during which he used a James Trussart Steelcaster bass. For live amplification he used two Ampeg Heritage B-15 reissues that are situated at the rear of the stage facing away, only one of them being mic'd. In the studio, it is unclear what basses he has used for individual tracks, but he has acknowledged using a Gibson Thunderbird Bass on the title track of "Chinese Democracy". As of 2011 Stinson is endorsing ESP guitar co. Notably using the ESP Vintage-4 with EMG PJ-Set pickups.

Stinson has stated that all his basses have EMG pickups, saying that "they give [him] a lot of growl and grit when they hit the preamp of an SVT." During recording, Stinson has used SWR amps, a Matchless combo and DI. Early live shows during his tenure with Guns N' Roses featured the SWR amps, but Stinson soon realized that it wasn't suitable for their situation (apparently, it was deemed too loud to be used at full capacity). Since then, he has been using the Ampeg Heritage B-15 Reissue 1x15 combo with a few Ampeg 8x10 cabinets for low-end.

EMG lists Stinson as a user of their PJ Set Pickups on their website.

At the NAMM Show in 2013, ESP introduced their new Tommy Stinson Signature Series basses. Stinson was on-hand for the festivities.

== Discography ==
Solo

- Village Gorilla Head (2004)
- One Man Mutiny (2011)
- Wronger (2023)

with The Replacements

- Sorry Ma, Forgot to Take Out the Trash (1981)
- Stink (1982)
- Hootenanny (1983)
- Let It Be (1984)
- Tim (1985)
- Pleased to Meet Me (1987)
- Don't Tell a Soul (1989)
- All Shook Down (1990)

with Bash & Pop

- Friday Night Is Killing Me (1993)
- Anything Could Happen (2017)

with Perfect

- When Squirrels Play Chicken EP (1996)
- Once, Twice, Three Times a Maybe (2004)

with Soul Asylum

- The Silver Lining (2006)
- Delayed Reaction (2011)

with Guns N' Roses

- Chinese Democracy (2008)
- Appetite for Democracy 3D (2014)

Miscellaneous appearances by Tommy Stinson
Year	Title	Artist	Record label	Credits
1994	Clerks: Music from the Motion Picture	Various Artists	Sony	Bash & Pop track "Making Me Sick"
1998	It's All about the Benjamins (Rock Remix)	Puff Daddy	Bad Boy	Bass
1999	End of Days	Various Artists	Geffen	Guns N' Roses track Oh My God
2001	Like a Butterfly 'cept Different	MOTH	Virgin	Bass
2002	Provisions, Fiction and Gear	MOTH	Virgin	Bass
2006	Catch and Release	Various Artists	Sony	Producer with BT – Original Soundtrack
2006	Catch and Release	with BT	Varèse Sarabande	Original Score
2008	Unfurled	Bobot Adrenaline	Geykido Comet	Producer
2010	Dumb Bomb	Bobot Adrenaline	Basement Records	Producer (on three tracks)
2014	Most Messed Up	Old 97's	ATO Records	Guitar and vocals on "Intervention" and "Most Messed Up"
2025	Through This Fire Across from Peter Balkan	The Mountain Goats	Cadmean Dawn	Bass (tracks 3 and 4)
