= WVM =

American musician

- Photo by Kristin Cofer

Background information
- Born: David Alvarez
- Origin: Los Angeles, California, US
- Genre: Electronic
- Occupations: Singer; songwriter; musician; composer
- Instruments: Vocals, piano, synthesizer, guitar, bass
- Years active: 2014–present
- Label: Unsigned
- Website: wvmmusic.com

WVM is a musician, composer and visual artist located in Los Angeles, California. He is a multi-instrumentalist who mainly uses analog equipment. In May 2017, "Empire" (Originally released in 2014) mixed by Sean Beavan debuted on The CW's TV show "The 100"

== History ==
=== Formation (2014) ===
A great number of his early demos under a number of different monikers were licensed to TV shows and video games such as Supergirl, UFC 3, Sony Computer Entertainment's Infamous 2 Official Karma trailer, Syfy's Being Human, CBS's Criminal Minds and Hostages among many other TV shows and video games.

== Discography ==
- Empire - Digital Single (2014)
- Pale Horse - Digital Single (2014)
- Duel - Digital Single (2018)
- After the Fall - Digital Single (2018)
- CRA - Digital Single (2018)
