= Immune to Gravity =

Studio album by MOTH
- Released: March 26, 2006
- Recorded: 2005
- Genre: Alternative rock, indie rock, power pop
- Length: 32:32
- Label: Hey Domingo!
- Producer: Todd Sullivan

MOTH chronology
Drop Deaf (2004)	Immune to Gravity (2006)

Professional ratings
Review scores
Source	Rating
Allmusic	link
Artistdirect	link
PopMatters	link

Immune to Gravity is the fifth studio album by the alternative rock band Moth. It was released in 2006 on Hey Domingo!.

== Track listing ==
All songs written by Brad Stenz.

1. Helpless – 2:55
2. Revolution – 2:50
3. Girl on Girl – 2:18
4. Sticks and Stones – 3:09
5. Perfect – 3:07
6. Supermodel – 2:59
7. Immune to Gravity – 2:37
8. Constantly On – 2:59
9. Put Her Down – 2:52
10. Shock City – 3:01
11. How Could You? – 3:41

== Recording process ==
The album was recorded at The Mouse House in Altadena, California. The song "Perfect" features backing vocals from Inara George. "Are You Really For Real?" was cut from the album.

== Writing and composition ==
"This album is kind of paying homage to the late '70s pop stuff, like Wire and Television and bands like that," Stenz said. "I think the Virgin record was more of a collection of songs over a long period of time because it had been a while since we recorded. The next record after that was 'Drop Deaf,' a very aggressive album. And this one is a very stripped-down rock record, where there's no unnecessary bells and whistles."

== Credits ==
- Brad Stenz – vocals, guitar
- Eric Diedrichs – guitar
- Eli White – bass
- Kevin Hogle – drums
