= Timkatec =

Children's homeless shelter in Haiti

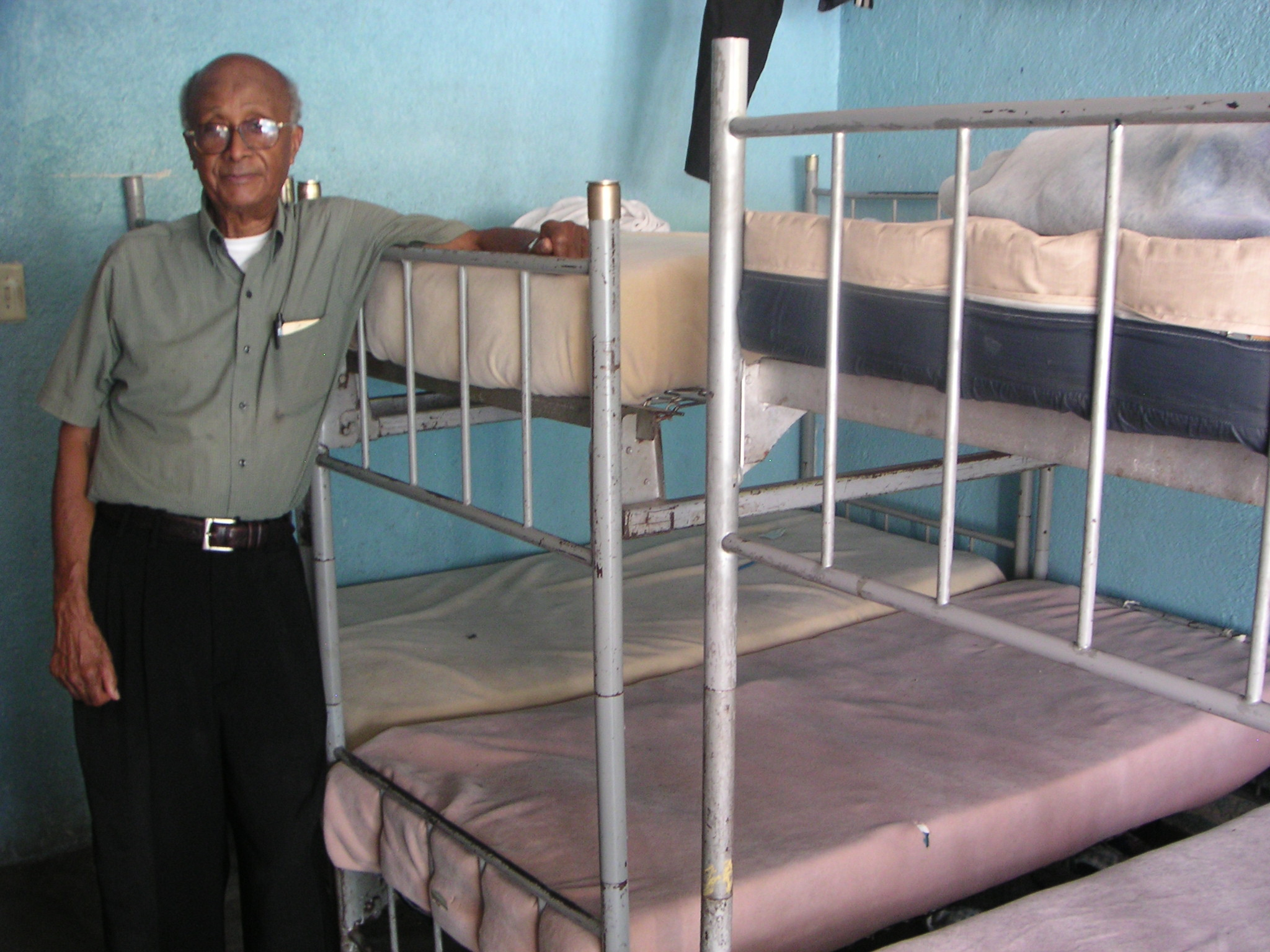
Father Simon Gatine Joseph Maceus at Timkatec

Timkatec is a homeless shelter for children in Port-au-Prince, Haiti, sponsored by The Friends of Timkatec in America, the GEOMOUN Fondation in Belgium (www.geomoun.org), Timkatec France and the Jasmine Foundation in Canada.

A Haitian Non-Governmental Organization, Timkatec is a home for "enfants de rues" or street children. It was founded by a retired Salesian High School teacher, Father Simon Gatine Joseph Maceus, in 1994. Father Simon started his effort with one building in Pétion-Ville near Port-au-Prince. The initial mission was to rescue orphaned and abandoned boys and give them physical, medical and spiritual care as well as an education in the Primary grades. Since then, with the active involvement of the above groups, that mission has increased to also provide secondary education and trade training to teenage boys and girls in four facilities, three of which have been newly built. Land for two of the facilities was donated by the Japanese Government, and the land for a third school now called Timkatec 3, by the Jasmine Foundation.

In this effort, Simon received funding from the international organisations in the USA, Belgium, France and Canada. By 2004, there were 40 residential students and 50 day students. In 2004 The Friends of Timkatec in America was founded by Patrick O'Shea and their family and friends, to assist the Timkatec effort.

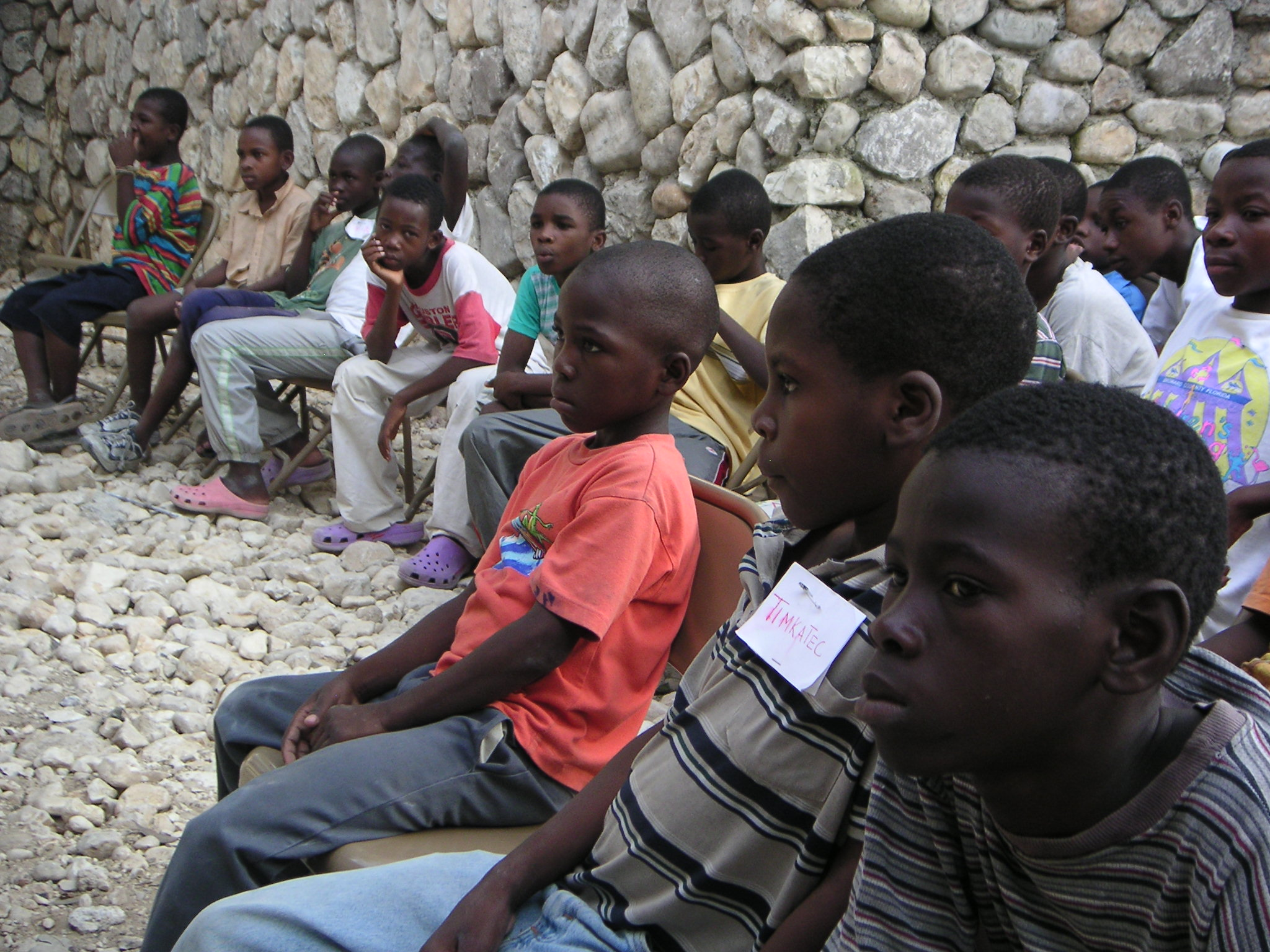
The Children of Timkatec, 2006

Father Simon's deep desire was to build a trade training school that would enable his students to continue their education and become independent, by training in various trades essential in the country. That school, now called Timkatec 2, is in nearby La botte Moquette and the new workshops were fully funded by The Friends of Timkatec in America and Catholic Relief Services in 2004. By 2005 construction of that workshop complex was commenced. It was completed in June 2006 and initial classes were started with 80 students in September 2006. By 2007 the number of classes doubled with five trades offered to 150 students with the first 15 graduates in 2008. In 2009 enrollment increased to 230 students and the second class graduated with 57 Electricians, tailors, plumbers, shoemakers and masons receiving State Diplomas

Father Simon continued Timkatec development with the completion of the third facility now called Timkatec 3, opened in September 2009 offering Primary and Trade Training to 130 girls. This building has a dual use, as a school during the day and as a shelter at night for over a hundred street children to receive a meal and a bed and a short instruction period. Funding for Timkatec 3 comes from the Jasmine Foundation and the Mennonite Central Committee (MCC). The Grand Opening was attended by Founder, Benjamin Plett. Operating funds for Timkatec 1 and 3 comes from GEOMOUN and Timkatec France, while the training at Timkatec 2 is funded by The Friends of Timkatec in America. The European supporters also fund the administrative costs Father Simon and the current effort to offer a production facility using the workshops at Timkatec 2 after instructional hours.

By early 2010, the total number of children and teenagers receiving the services of the Timkatec facilities is over 500 compared to 90 in 2004, with a staff of 35. All US funding for the Timkatec Schools is from private donations with some additional material donations. Belgian funding is from GEOMOUN with a multiple matching support from the European Commission, Timkatec France funding is from the Fondation-France, controlled by the Office of the President of France with some additional private donor support. The Haitian Government provides no assistance to such private schools although some Haitian donors offer Father Simon material support as do Haitian American Groups and Salesian Alumnae groups.
