= Sean Beavan =

American record producer

- Origin: Cleveland, Ohio, U.S.
- Genres: Industrial rock; industrial metal
- Occupations: Record producer; mixing engineer; composer
- Years active: 1982–present
- Website: twitter.com/seanbeavan

Sean Beavan is an American record producer and audio engineer best known for his work with Nine Inch Nails, Marilyn Manson, Guns N' Roses, God Lives Underwater, and Slayer. His production style is typically heavy, with heavily saturated guitars, but his work is diverse and wide-ranging as exemplified by bands like No Doubt to System of a Down, to indie bands like Thrice, Envy on the Coast, Hypernova (band), 8mm, and even death metal band Morbid Angel.

== Career ==
Beavan started his career as a musician and engineer in his hometown of Cleveland, Ohio. He played bass and sang in various local bands and also played fretless bass with Clevelander Eric Carmen (of Raspberries) on the song "Hungry Eyes" on the Dirty Dancing soundtrack. From 1989 to 1990 he was a member of Humble Pie featuring Jerry Shirley. While working as an engineer at The Right Track Studio in downtown Cleveland, Beavan met Trent Reznor who worked as the in-house programmer. Reznor also played keyboards in several local bands that Beavan mixed.

Reznor asked Beavan to mix the demos of what would eventually become Pretty Hate Machine, which had received multiple offers for record deals. Beavan mixed sound during Nine Inch Nails' live concerts for many years, eventually becoming an unofficial member of the live band, and even singing live backup vocals from his place at the mixing console. Reznor invited him to work on The Downward Spiral as well as mix several songs on Marilyn Manson's debut record Portrait of an American Family. After contributing to several Nine Inch Nails remix releases (including Closer to God), Beavan mixed and co-produced Marilyn Manson's Antichrist Superstar.

In 1996, after 8 years, Beavan left the Nine Inch Nails camp to mix front of house for the "Antichrist Superstar" world tour. In late 1997 Beavan and Manson moved into the Hollywood Hills and started production on Mechanical Animals.

Beavan went on to produce and mix records for artists as diverse as Guns N' Roses, God Lives Underwater, System of a Down, Depeche Mode, No Doubt, Slayer, Kill Hannah, HYDE, P.O.D., Paloalto, Thrice, Unwritten Law, MOTH, Kidneythieves, Tommy Stinson, Tiger Lou, Hypernova, and Chronic Future. He also returned to work with Manson, mixing Eat Me, Drink Me.

In 2005 Beavan travelled to Chile with 8mm for 2 concerts. Also to record the second album of the Chilean band E-MEN. He joined Rod Sáez Chávez, Diego Sagredo and Daniel Cartes for the recording of the album at Agharta Studios.

Beavan is currently involved in his own band with his wife Juliette Beavan, called 8mm. 8 mm has an album entitled Songs to Love and Die By which was released in late 2006. Having supported Sean Lennon on the west coast leg of his North American tour the dynamic Trip hop band are currently regulars in the Los Angeles music scene and have toured the US and Great Britain. After recently producing and mixing Denver Colorado favorites Meese for Atlantic records, Beavan worked in the studio with Marilyn Manson on his forthcoming album with Chris Vrenna and Twiggy Ramirez at Sage and Sound in Hollywood, then mixed "The High End of Low" at his home studio, The Blue Room. This March found Sean Beavan mixing fellow Clevelanders THIS IS A SHAKEDOWN!'s debut record on the newly formed Reversed Image Unlimited record label. Produced by Multi-Platinum producer Michael Seifert and recorded at Michael's Ante Up Audio located in the heart of downtown Cleveland, Sean mixed the record in their new SSL suite. Beavan recently Mixed 4 songs for Japanese-American Sony Records artist Kylee produced by Jeff Turzo of God Lives Underwater fame, and is currently starting production and mixing duties with Long Island indie faves Envy on the Coast.

== Production discography ==
- Pretty Hate Machine (1989) by Nine Inch Nails – Mixer
- The Downward Spiral (1994) by Nine Inch Nails – Mixer
- Portrait of an American Family (1994) by Marilyn Manson – assistant producer, programming, digital editing
- Antichrist Superstar (1996) by Marilyn Manson – Producer, programming, engineering, digital editing
- Mechanical Animals (1998) by Marilyn Manson – Producer, programming, engineering, digital editing
- Provisions, Fiction and Gear (2002) by MOTH – Producer
- When Pure Is Defiled (2003) by Jerk (band) – producer
- Up Off The Floor (2004) by God Lives Underwater – Producer, Programming, Bass, Guitar, Noises.
- Faith (2006) by HYDE – Mixer
- Eat Me, Drink Me (2007) by Marilyn Manson – Mixer
- A Partial Print (2008) by Tiger Lou – Mixer
- Chinese Democracy (2008) by Guns N' Roses – Recording and digital editing, arrangements, initial production, additional production
- The High End of Low (2009) by Marilyn Manson – Producer
- Lowcountry (2010) by Envy On The Coast – Producer
- Blackjazz (2010) by Shining – Producer, Mixer
- Illud Divinum Insanus (2011) by Morbid Angel – Engineer, Mixer
- Born Villain (2012) by Marilyn Manson – Mixer
- Pacifica (2012) by The Presets – Engineer
- "Change" EP (2012) by Churchill – Mixer
- "The End Is Only the Beginning" EP (2012) by WVM – Producer, Engineer, Mixer
- "One One One" (2013) by Shining – Producer, Mixer
- "Mer de Noms" Live Album (2013) by A Perfect Circle – Mixer
- "Thirteenth Step" Live Album (2013) by A Perfect Circle – Mixer
- "eMOTIVe " Live (2013) by A Perfect Circle – Mixer
- "Stone and Echo" (2013) by A Perfect Circle – Mixer
- "Diary of A Tomahawk" (2013) by Black Lodge – Mixer, Co-Producer with Twiggy Ramirez
- "Shutdown.exe" (2017) by 3Teeth – Mixer, Engineer
- "Metawar" (2019) by 3Teeth – Programming, recording engineer, mixing engineer, producer
