= 3Teeth =

American industrial metal band

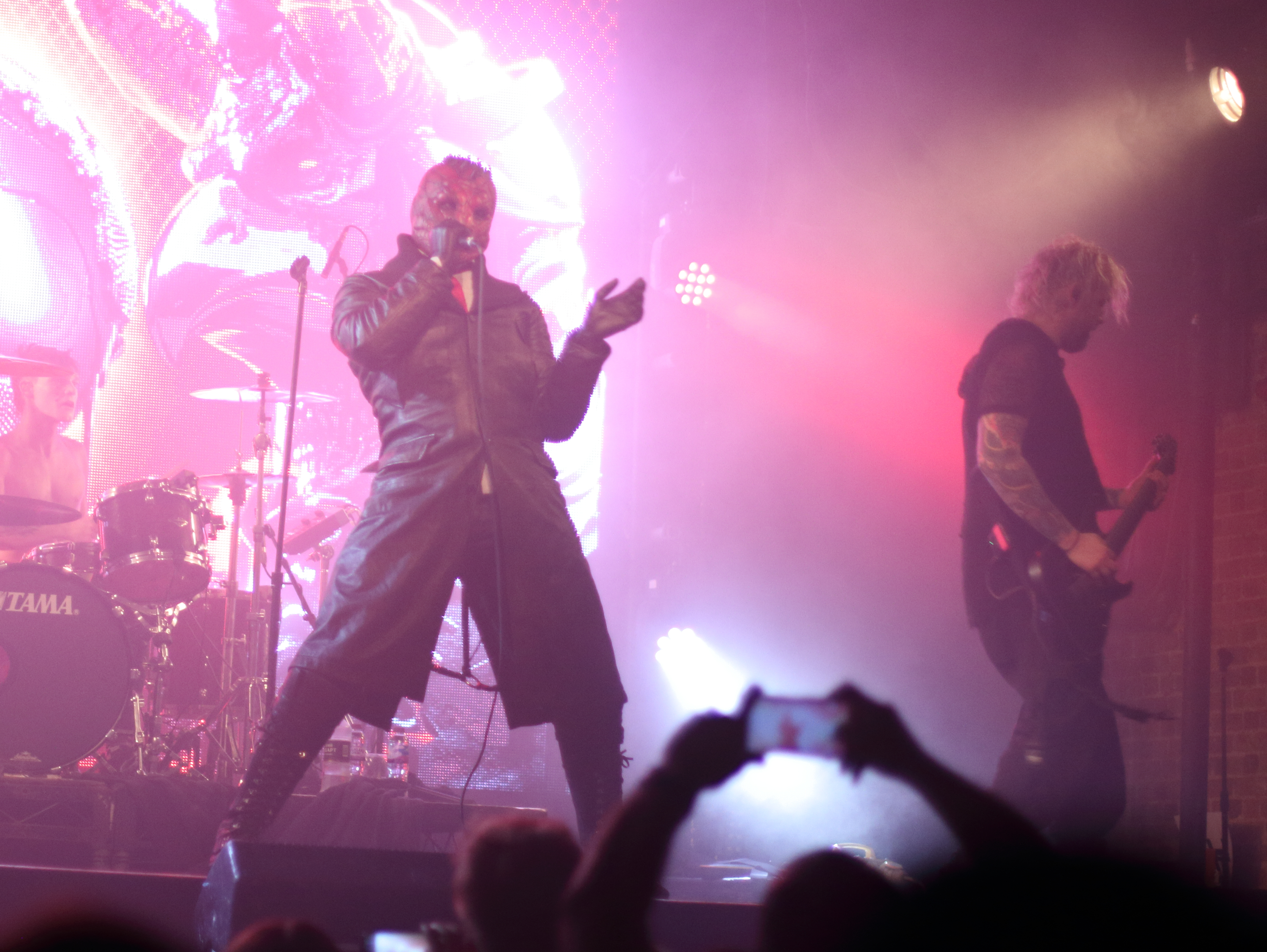
- 3Teeth in 2020

Background information
- Origin: Los Angeles, California, U.S.
- Genres: Industrial; industrial metal; industrial rock; nu metal; electro-industrial
- Years active: 2013–present
- Labels: Artoffact; OMF; Century Media
- Members: Alexis Mincolla; Xavier Swafford; Andrew Means; Chase Brawner; Nick Rossi
- Past members: Andrew Melendez; Justin Hanson
- Website: 3teeth.org

3Teeth (stylized as 3TEETH or 3T3ETH) is an American industrial metal band from Los Angeles, California. Formed in 2013, the band consists of Alexis Mincolla (vocals), Chase Brawner (guitars), Xavier Swafford (keyboards and synthesizers), Andrew Means (modular synth and bass), and Nick Rossi (drums). They have released four studio albums: their self-titled debut in 2014, shutdown.exe in 2017, Metawar in 2019, and EndEx in 2023.

== History ==
=== Name and formation (2013–2014) ===
The group initially formed as a fun passion-project between Mincolla and Swafford, who lived down the street from each other in Los Angeles. Mincolla did not have a musical background but had experience in visual arts and promotion. Mincolla and Swafford met at a weekly party called Lil Death, which was hosted by Mincolla, where they began discussing some ideas for a multi-media mix of visuals and music. The two soon met Andrew Means after being impressed by an online video he sent the pair which Mincolla described as looking "like a computer virus".

After some of their music was hosted online and began to gain traction, the three sought out a guitarist for the project. Guitar work had initially been outsourced but the turnaround time was slow. Means had grown up with Brawner and suggested that the trio audition him, and after a successful audition Chase joined and 3Teeth had officially formed.

The band took the name 3Teeth from the concepts of Odontomancy, which Mincolla described as an ancient form of divination where "the seer would read prophecies in the teeth like rune stones." as well as the word trident, which comes from Latin for "three teeth". Mincolla said of the trident: "...this divine weapon of God that brings destruction. It's what Marduk killed Tiamat with -- this caught thunderbolt or trident."

The band was formed by Alexis Mincolla (vocals) and Xavier Swafford (keyboards, synthesizers), with Chase Brawner (guitar) and Andrew Means (bass & modular synth) joining shortly after. Means performed live drums on an electric kit. Andrew Melendez joined as then drummer in 2017 before Justin Hanson joined the group in the fall of 2017. The band signed to Century Media Records in April 2018, with Hanson being announced as the official fifth member of the band. In June 2020, the band announced that they had mutually parted ways with Hanson and that Rossi would be joining them as the new drummer to commence recording on the band's fourth album.

=== Self-titled debut album and shutdown.exe (2014–2017) ===
Their self-titled debut album was released in 2014. The album contained the singles: "Pearls 2 Swine", "Master of Decay", and "Nihil". The album took six months to complete and half of the music written was cut from the album. The band was also unsure about how the album would be received. The album reached the number eight spot on iTunes Electronic Music Chart, and number two on iTunes industrial charts. A remix album titled Remixed followed in October 2014, featuring remixes by other prominent industrial artists such as KANGA and Aesthetic Perfection.

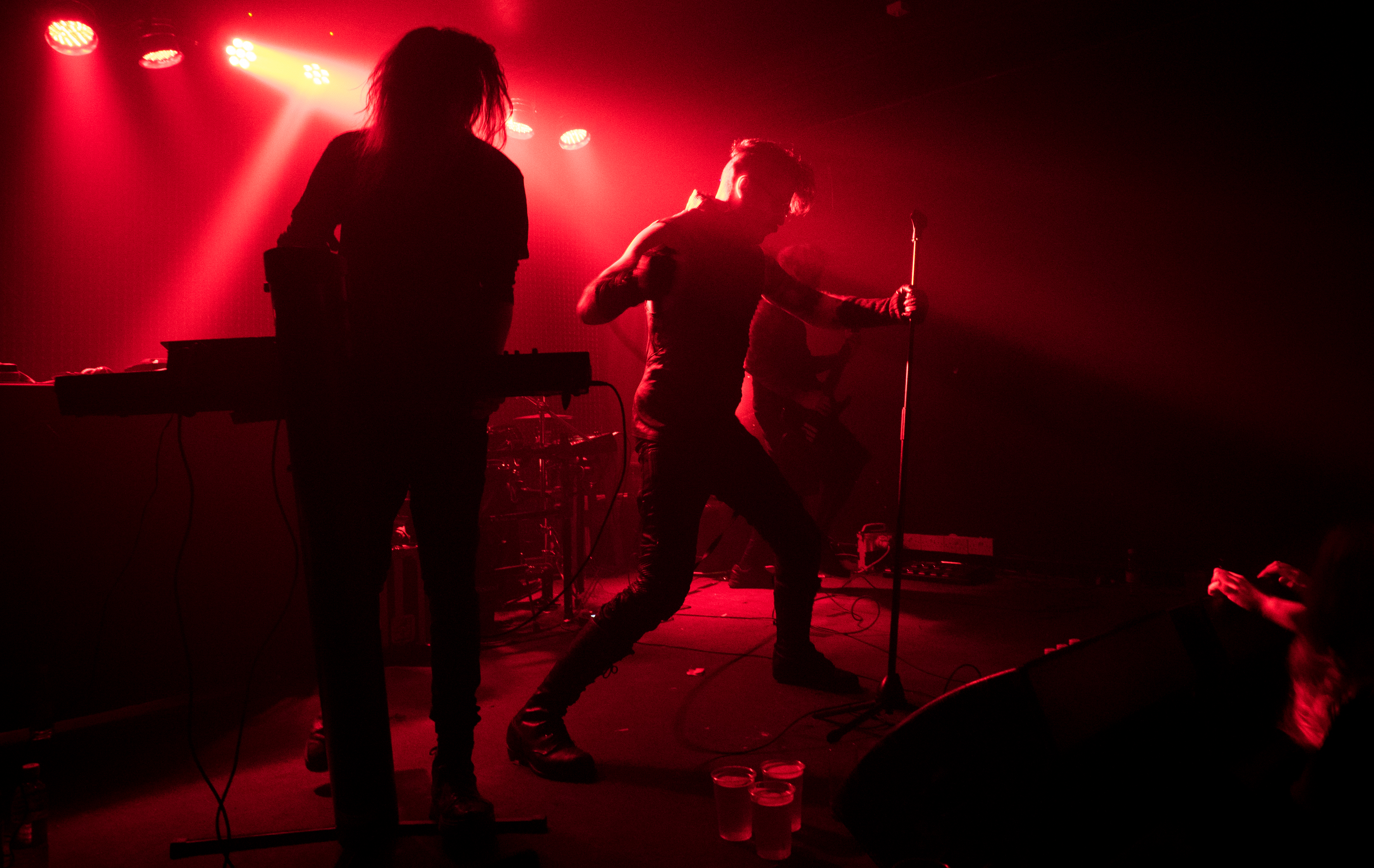
3Teeth performing in 2015

The band started working on their second album in 2015 when "Sell Your Face" and "Slavegod" were released online. The band was originally going to spend late 2015 and early 2016 working on the album, but held off writing and recording when the band was hand-selected as the opener's for Tool's 2016 North American tour, along with Primus. In June 2016, the album's lead single, "Degrade" was released. The album's second single, "Atrophy", was released in August 2016. In March 2017, the band announced their second album, <shutdown.exe>, which wad released on May 19, 2017. The album spawned two more singles: "Shutdown", and "Away from Me". The album was self-produced by the band and mixed by Sean Beavan, who is best known for working with other prominent industrial artists Nine Inch Nails and Marilyn Manson. The album reached No. 23 on Billboard the following month. In February 2018, the band released the first of two collaboration tracks, "Light's Out", with hip-hop/punk artists Ho99o9. A second track, "Time's Up", was released in March 2018, and both tracks were later released on a limited edition 7" vinyl following a co-headlining tour titled Lights Out North America. The tour included multiple dates opening for Rammstein on their limited U.S. tour.

=== Metawar and Endex (2018–present) ===
The band began working on their third album in early 2018, Instead of being self-produced, the album was produced by Sean Beavan. The title for the third album, Metawar, was announced on April 5, 2019, alongside the release of the debut single "American Landfill". The music video for American Landfill debuted on April 15, 2019. The video was directed by Matthew Santoro, longtime-friend of Alexis Mincolla and Hollywood director and visual effects artist whose credits include X-Men Origins: Wolverine and 300.

The second single for Metawar, "Exxxit", was released on April 23, 2019, alongside a music video and a North American tour announcement with Author & Punisher and Gost as support. The third single, "Affluenza", was released on May 31, 2019, alongside an official lyric music video. The fourth single, "President X", was released on June 14, 2019. The single was accompanied by a music video featuring Mincolla as a neo-fascist lizard-man president in "band's most outwardly political song to date." The fifth single released was the band's cover of "Pumped Up Kicks" by Foster the People which was released on June 28, 2019. A music video featuring a SWAT raid and firearms footage was released alongside the cover.

Metawar was released worldwide on July 5, 2019. Frontman Mincolla described the album as centering on "the idea of world vs world, and the notion that if man doesn't create his own world then he's often crushed by the world of another."

On January 17, 2020, "Altær" was released as the sixth single from Metawar. It was released along with a music video which featured footage captured at their performance at 2019's Wasteland Weekend.

While touring in support of Metawar in 2019, the band recorded two cover songs for the film Guns Akimbo. Their cover of "You Spin Me Round (Like a Record)" by Dead or Alive was featured in the film's trailer, and it was later announced that the second cover song would be "The Ballroom Blitz", originally recorded by The Sweet.

Following its release, Metawar became the band's most commercially successful album, debuting at No. 23 on Billboard. The album also debuted at No. 82 on Billboard's Top Album Sales chart for the week of July 20, 2019, and at No. 3 on Billboard's Heatseekers Albums for the same week. With the release of Metawar, 3Teeth themselves charted at No. 25 on Billboard's Emerging Artists chart.

On August 6, 2021, the band released a song titled "Paralyze" featuring punk rap group Ho99o9. The song was produced by Mick Gordon. On May 3, 2023, the band released a song titled "Merchant of the Void" featuring Mick Gordon. They also announced that they will be releasing a new song each month until the album is out. On May 31, 2023, the band released the song "Slum Planet" featuring Mick Gordon. "Scorpion", the fourth single from the upcoming album, was released on June 30, 2023. The single release accompanied the official announcement that the band's fourth album, EndEx, would be released on September 22, 2023. "Drift", the fifth single from the upcoming album, was released on July 26, 2023. "Higher than Death", the sixth single from the album, was released on August 24, 2023. On July 15, 2025, the band released a cover of "Civil War" by Guns N' Roses.

== Live performances ==
3Teeth are known for their use of menacing visuals during live performances. The band was hand-selected by Tool to be their supporting act on their 2016 North American tour. The group opened for German band Rammstein for some of their U.S. dates in the summer of 2017 and ended the year performing with Danzig and HIM. 3Teeth were selected by Rammstein to open for them on their special New Year's Eve performances in Mexico in December 2018 / January 2019. The band spent much of 2019 touring in support of Metawar, including a European tour as support for Ministry and a headlining North American tour alongside Gost and Author & Punisher before closing the year in support of Ghostemane for select dates.

3Teeth resumed touring in February 2020, kicking off another European headlining tour with industrial icon Pig as support for UK shows. A 2020 North American co-headlining tour with Carnifex was announced soon after along with the announcements that 3Teeth would play multiple festival dates throughout the year, including Welcome to Rockville and Hellfest. The COVID-19 pandemic forced the band to cancel the remainder of their 2020 shows, including the tour with Carnifex.

== Musical styles and influences ==
3Teeth's musical style has been described as industrial, industrial metal, industrial rock, nu metal, electro-industrial, alternative metal, and EBM. Remfry Dedman of The Independent described the band as "Sounding like the warped, twisted love-child of Marilyn Manson and Rob Zombie...[hearkening] back to an era where industrial music sounded like a genuinely dangerous soundtrack to a dystopian present-day reality." While describing the band's debut self-titled album Neil Z. Yeung of AllMusic wrote, "[lead] by imposing vocalist Alexis Mincolla, who spouts distorted declarations and intense screams over atmospheric...instrumentation...[the album is] hypnotic, uncomfortable, discordant, ominous, threatening, carnal, visceral...[combining] transgressive social commentary, thought-provoking lyrics, a calculated aesthetic, and great sonic production." The band's second album, <shutdown.exe>, was described as heavier than their debut.

The band also has been compared to bands such as Ministry, Skinny Puppy, Nine Inch Nails, KMFDM, Bile, Dope, Rammstein, and Tool. Lead vocalist, Alexis Mincolla, listens to bands like Sepultura, Pantera, White Zombie, and Nine Inch Nails. He cites The Downward Spiral by Nine Inch Nails as a huge influence for 3Teeth's music.

== Band members ==
Current

- Alexis Mincolla – vocals (2013–present)
- Xavier Swafford – keyboards, synthesizers (2013–present)
- Andrew Means – bass, modular synthesizer (2017–present), drums (2013–2017)
- Chase Brawner – guitars (2013–present)
- Nick Rossi – drums (2020–present)

Former

- Andrew Melendez – drums (2017)
- Justin Hanson – drums (2017–2020)

Timeline

== Discography ==
Studio albums

- 3Teeth (2014)
- <shutdown.exe> (2017)
- Metawar (2019)
- EndEx (2023)

Other releases

- Remixed (2014) - remix album for the self-titled debut
- "Lights Out" / "Time's Up" (2018) - limited 7" vinyl with Ho99o9
- Guns Akimbo ("You Spin Me Round (Like a Record)" / "Ballroom Blitz") (2021) - limited 7" vinyl
- Lord of the Wasteland - Jam Track for Fortnite (Chapter 5 Season 3 Battle Pass)
