= Curtiss A =

Musician and visual artist from Minneapolis

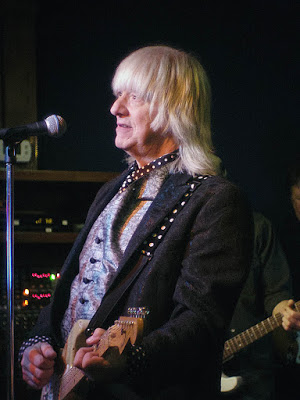
- Curtiss A in 2017
- Born: Curt Almsted; January 31, 1951 (age 75)
- Occupations: Musician, visual artist
- Years active: 1969-present

Curtiss A (born Curt Almsted on January 31, 1951) is a musician and visual artist from Minneapolis. One of the original artists on the Twin/Tone Records label, he performs one of the most popular shows in the Twin Cities, an annual tribute to John Lennon held at First Avenue. He was the first musician to headline at First Avenue's sister club 7th Street Entry, and opened for Prince's first concert at First Avenue (then still called Uncle Sam's).

Emerging a few years before the 1980s heyday of Minneapolis indie-rock groups like the Replacements and Hüsker Dü, he has been called a "slightly-elder statesman" of the Minneapolis music scene. Ira Robbins of Trouser Press called him "a talented songwriter with a great sense of humor, an adequate if colorless voice and connections with every other local Minneapolis musician (except maybe Prince), many of whom played on his first album."

He is sometimes known by the nickname "The Dean of Scream."

== Early life ==
Almsted spent his youth in Minneapolis, Moorhead, Minnesota, Oklahoma, and Indiana after the remarriage of his mother. He told the Minneapolis Star Tribune that his teenage years were "a whole lotta trouble."

His first public performance was at a Halloween party in Whiting, Indiana, in 1965.

In 1969, he attended Southwest State University in Marshall, Minnesota, where he met several future bandmates.

== Career ==
=== As a musician ===
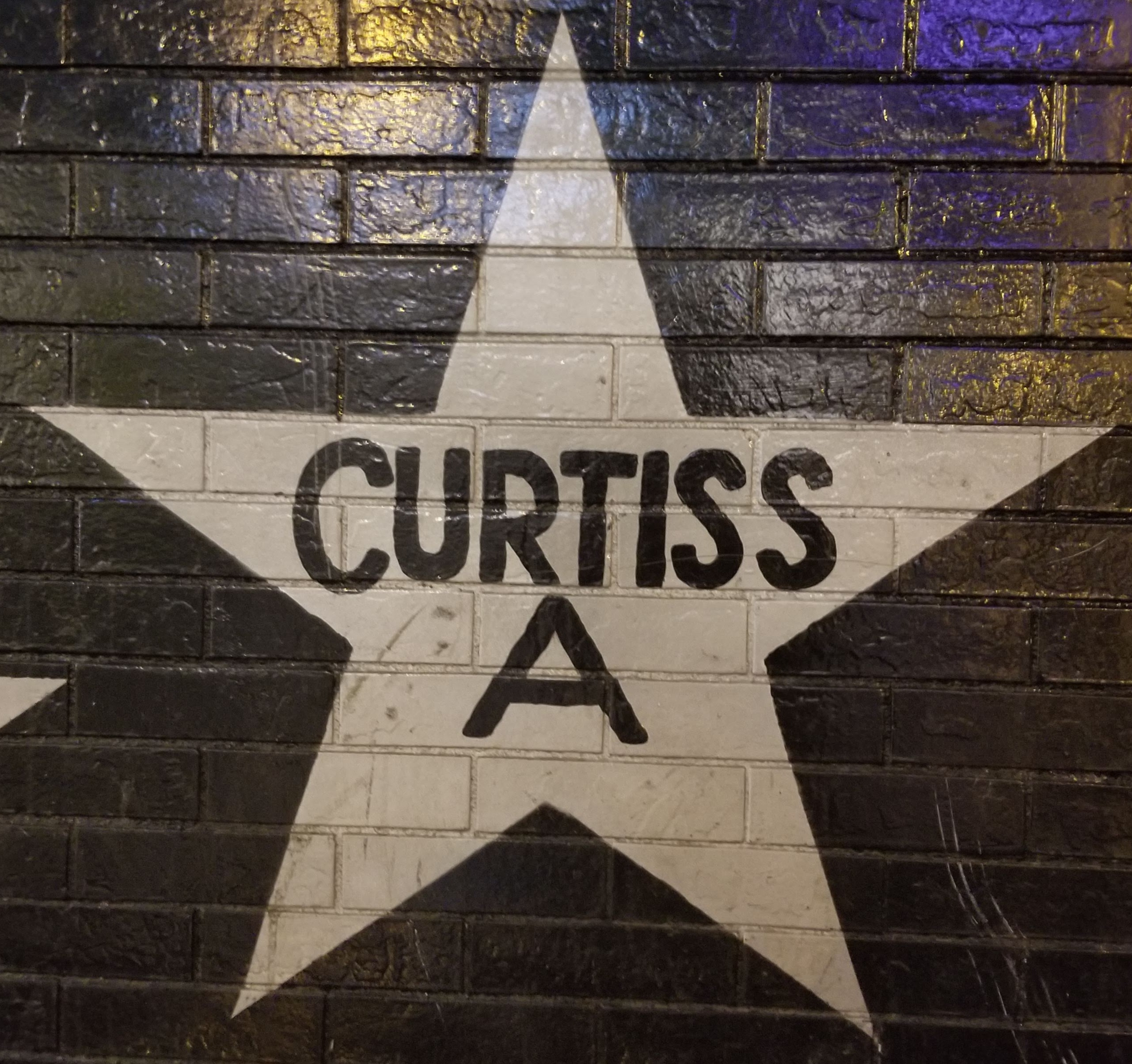
Curtiss A's star on the outside mural of the Minneapolis nightclub First Avenue

Curtiss formed Wire, his first Twin Cities band, in 1969 and played with various permutations of that group through the 1970s. (Almsted's band is unrelated to the English post-punk band of the same name.) His first recording, a six-song EP, was with the Spooks, which he started with future Replacements guitarist Slim Dunlap.

In 1978, Curtiss (as Buzz Barker) released the single-cum-political rant "I Don’t Wanna Be President". Its B-side, "Land of the Free", was played at Solidarity rallies as the Polish trade union protested martial law. Following those classic singles, Twin/Tone released a full-length album in 1980. The acclaimed Courtesy received four stars in Rolling Stone. Curtiss followed with two more albums on Twin/Tone, The Damage is Done and A Scarlet Letter, the latter produced by Al Anderson of NRBQ. Dunlap, his longtime bandmate, split off in 1987 after being recruited to join the Replacements. Scarlet Letter, a collection of songs about love, adultery, and jealousy, was named after the 1850 Nathaniel Hawthorne novel.

In a retrospective review of Curtiss' Twin/Tone albums, Trouser Press' Robbins called Courtesy "energetic rockers in a niche between Marshall Crenshaw, Bruce Springsteen and George Thorogood, but much rawer and less predictable." He called Damage Is Done "a more mature record" with "well-drawn, heartfelt songs." Noting that A Scarlet Letter was made after a particularly bad year in Curtiss' personal life, Robbins said that the album was "easily his best record", a set of resonant roots rock" whose "nakedly emotional missives ... get soulful treatment from Almsted’s impassioned voice, which has really come to resemble (Willy) DeVille’s." A Scarlet Letter was dedicated (unironically, claimed Robbins) to Ike Turner.

The next LP was to have been produced by Peter Holsapple and the dBs, but Curtiss took a break from performing following a family tragedy.

Since his return to music, Curtiss has released several albums. He plays throughout the Twin Cities with his band, The Jerks of Fate.

In 2020, Curtiss released the album Jerks of Fate, named after his longtime backing band. The album was recorded at Creation Audio in Minneapolis and produced by John Fields, with Flipp singer Brynn Arens as executive producer. The album was put together from more than 100 songs that he had recorded on demo tapes in the years after 1987's A Scarlet Letter.

His annual Lennon show is being documented by Twin Cities filmmaker Amy Buchanan.

=== As a visual artist ===
During his hiatus from music, Curtiss turned to making collages, an art form that has interested him since childhood and has fulfilled his desire “to see stuff that wasn’t together, together.” He mixes all types and periods of art, particularly different styles of comic book illustrations.

Curtiss describes his collages as dreamscapes where iconic figures—or other images that embody a mythic quality—are placed in iconoclastic situations or surroundings. He often uses political and theological images along with depictions of superheroes to represent the constant struggle for justice and to question who or what is truly good. His work also has a great deal of humor, leaving the viewer with a mixture of despair and hope.

== Personal life ==
Almsted has four daughters; the third, Alyson, died in 1987 of sudden infant death syndrome. He has five grandchildren.

In 1987, he was briefly jailed for assaulting a former girlfriend.

== Honors and awards ==
Almsted has been honored with a star on the outside mural of the Minneapolis nightclub First Avenue, recognizing performers that have played sold-out shows or have otherwise demonstrated a major contribution to the culture at the iconic venue. Receiving a star "might be the most prestigious public honor an artist can receive in Minneapolis," according to journalist Steve Marsh.

== Selected discography ==
Courtesy
Review scores
Source	Rating
AllMusic	3/5 stars
Rolling Stone	4/5 stars

Damage Is Done
Review scores
Source	Rating
AllMusic	2/5 stars

Scarlet Letter
Review scores
Source	Rating
AllMusic	4.5/5 stars

- Courtesy (Twin/Tone, 1980)
- Damage Is Done (Twin/Tone, 1984)
- Scarlet Letter (Twin/Tone, 1988)
- Jerks of Fate (independent, 2020)
