= Besterberg: The Best of Paul Westerberg =

Greatest hits album by Paul Westerberg
- Released: May 17, 2005
- Genre: Alternative rock
- Length: 72:07
- Label: Rhino
- Producer: Paul Westerberg

Paul Westerberg chronology
| Folker (2004) | Besterberg: The Best of Paul Westerberg (2005) | The Resterberg (2005) |

Professional ratings
Review scores
| Source | Rating |
|---|---|
| Allmusic | link |

Besterberg: The Best of Paul Westerberg is a compilation album of former Replacements frontman Paul Westerberg's solo work. It was released the same day as The Resterberg (May 17, 2005), and contains all eight tracks from that compilation. Both albums use the same font & the same cover photo.

Included are singles, B-sides, soundtrack contributions & outtakes from 14 Songs & Eventually. The version of "Once Around the Weekend" has a spoken section on bridge & differs from the version that appears on Eventually.

== Track listing ==
All tracks are written by Paul Westerberg, except "Nowhere Man" by Lennon–McCartney.

| No. | Title | Writer(s) | From the album: | Length |
|---|---|---|---|---|
| 1. | "Dyslexic Heart" | | Singles Motion Picture Soundtrack | 4:31 |
| 2. | "Knockin' on Mine" | | 14 Songs | 3:45 |
| 3. | "World Class Fad" | | 14 Songs | 3:31 |
| 4. | "Runaway Wind" | | 14 Songs | 4:26 |
| 5. | "Things" | | 14 Songs | 3:22 |
| 6. | "Seein' Her" | | B-Side to "World Class Fad" single | 2:59 |
| 7. | "Man Without Ties" | | "Knockin' on Mine" Promo single | 3:28 |
| 8. | "A Star Is Bored" | | Melrose Place TV Series Soundtrack | 3:55 |
| 9. | "Stain Yer Blood" | | Friends TV Series Soundtrack | 3:02 |
| 10. | "Love Untold" | | Eventually | 4:18 |
| 11. | "Once Around the Weekend" (Alternate Mix) | | Eventually | 4:06 |
| 12. | "Angels Walk" | | Eventually | 3:30 |
| 13. | "It's a Wonderful Lie" | | Suicaine Gratifaction | 2:49 |
| 14. | "Lookin' Out Forever" | | Suicaine Gratifaction | 3:43 |
| 15. | "Nowhere Man" | John Lennon–Paul McCartney | I Am Sam Motion Picture Soundtrack | 3:30 |
| 16. | "High Time" (as Grandpaboy) | | Stereo/Mono | 3:02 |
| 17. | "Let the Bad Times Roll" | | Stereo/Mono | 3:45 |
| 18. | "What a Day (For a Night)" | | Come Feel Me Tremble | 3:15 |
| 19. | "All That I Had" | | The Resterberg | 4:27 |
| 20. | "C'mon, C'mon, C'mon" | | The Resterberg | 2:43 |
| Total length: | | | | 72:07 |

== Personnel ==
- Paul Westerberg – guitar, acoustic guitar, slide guitar, bass, piano, drums, keyboards, vocals, backing vocals, melodica, producer, compilation producer, instrumentation, liner notes
- Kenny Aronoff – drums
- Michael Bland – percussion
- Charmony Brothers – backing vocals
- Keith Christopher – bass
- Luther Covington – guitar
- Josh Freese – percussion, drums
- Suzie Katayama – accordion, cello
- Josh Kelly – drums, backing vocals
- Scott Litt – producer
- Brian MacLeod – drums
- Brendan O'Brien – acoustic guitar, bass, guitar, keyboards, producer
- John Pierce – bass
- Zeke Pine – bass
- Rick Price – bass, mandolin, backing vocals
- Elrod Puce – maracas, triangle, backing vocals, handclapping
- Benmont Tench – keyboards
- Henry Twiddle – drums
- Michael Urbano – percussion, drums
- Matt Wallace – percussion, backing vocals, producer
- Don Was – bass, producer, acoustic bass
- Matthew Abels – project assistant
- Kim Biggs – art direction, design
- Kristin Callahan – photography
- Reggie Collins – discographical annotation
- Sheryl Farber – editorial supervision
- Lou Giordano – producer
- Dan Hersch – remastering
- Darren Hill – compilation producer
- Bill Inglot – remastering
- Dennis Keeley – cover photo
- Hayley Madden – Photography
- Kenny Nemes – project assistant
- Frank Okenfels – photography
- Randy Perry – project assistant
- Ron Pownall – photography
- Glenn Schwartz – project assistant
- Jim Steinfeldt – photography
- Miranda Penn Turin – photography
- Becky Wagner – project assistant
- Tanya Welsch – project assistant
- Mason Williams – compilation producer
