= WCAL (disambiguation) =

WCAL can refer to:

- WCAL, an FM radio station licensed to California, Pennsylvania broadcasting on 91.9 MHz.
- KCMP, an FM radio station that started out as WCAL-FM 89.3 in 1968
- WCAL (Minnesota), an AM radio station licensed to Northfield, Minnesota that operated from 1922 until its deletion in 1991.
- West Catholic Athletic League
- Wayne County Athletic League
