= 49:00 =

Studio album by Paul Westerberg
- Released: 2008
- Recorded: June 2008
- Genres: Alternative rock; sound collage
- Length: 43:55
- Language: English
- Label: Dry Wood
- Producer: Paul Westerberg

Paul Westerberg chronology
The Resterberg (2005)	49:00 (2008)	3oclockreep (2008)

49:00 (styled 49:00... Of Your ~~Time~~ Life) is a 2008 album by Paul Westerberg. The album was originally slated for a release on July 19, 2008 (marketed as "June 49"), but digital distribution problems delayed its release until July 21.

The album is a single track that was sold on Amazon.com's Amazon MP3 service for 49 U.S. cents. According to Westerberg's manager, Darren Hill, the 49-cent price was initially a joke suggested by Westerberg: fans would pay "a penny a minute." Hill then shopped the idea to various retailers; Amazon was the only one willing to distribute the album for the 49 cent price. The album was later listed on Tunecore for worldwide distribution, as Amazon MP3 limits purchases to customers in the United States. The long sound collage is intended to mirror the experience of tuning a radio dial, with songs abruptly cutting off and starting.

49:00 has no track listing—fans attempted to separate songs and name them.

Westerberg played all of the instruments himself. The project was finished on July 14, 2008, was delivered by Westerberg to Hill on the following day; it was available via Amazon on July 21, 2008, and hit No. 1 on the Amazon sales chart. The song Outta My System was later recorded by Westerberg as part of the I Don't Cares on Wild Stab.

49:00 was deleted from TuneCore on July 29, 2008, and Amazon two days later. Westerberg has received no official explanation for the album's removal from either service. Celia Hirschman of KCRW explained that the sudden removal might have been due to cease and desist notices sent to music sellers. Westerberg confirmed this, saying, "Ten publishers came after us immediately 'cause I used all these snippets of songs that I recorded. It was either pay up or pull the thing."

In 2014, 49:00 and 5:05 were posted to Westerberg's SoundCloud account with the comment, "I tried to release this in 2008 and had a lot of problems. That being said I hope you enjoy it."

== Critical reception ==
Professional ratings
Review scores
Source	Rating
ABC News	favorable
AllMusic	4/5 stars
The A.V. Club	B+
Crawdaddy	favorable
Live Daily	favorable
Pitchfork	7.1/10
Rocky Mountain News	A

== Track listing ==
1. "49:00" – 43:55

No.	Title	Length
1.	"Who You Gonna Marry?"	3:57
2.	"Kentucky Riser"	3:01
3.	"Something in My Life is Missing"	3:42
4.	"Visitor’s Day"	3:32
5.	"Thoroughbred"	0:06
6.	"Devil Raised a Good Boy"	3:13
7.	"You’re My Girl"	0:24
8.	"Everyone’s Stupid"	2:37
9.	"What Do You Want?"	0:20
10.	"Never Coming Back"	0:44
11.	"Goodnight Sweet Prince"	3:54
12.	"Guess I’ll Be Goin Then"	0:08
13.	"Outta My System"	3:22
14.	"Be My Darlin'"	3:44
15.	"(Unknown)"	0:12
16.	"100,000 Pieces"	1:12
17.	"I'm Clean"	1:11
18.	"You're Sister"	0:06
19.	"I’ll Never Die"	4:04
20.	"(Medley)"	2:01
21.	"Oh Yea!"	2:09

- The medley includes: "Hello, Goodbye" – The Beatles; "Lost Highway" – Hank Williams; "Born to Be Wild" – Steppenwolf; "Stupid Girl" – The Rolling Stones; "I'm Eighteen" – Alice Cooper; "I Am a Rock" – Simon and Garfunkel; "Rocket Man" – Elton John; "Dandy" – The Kinks; "I Think I Love You" - The Partridge Family

== "5:05" ==
"5:05"

Single by Paul Westerberg
- Released: August 6, 2008
- Recorded: 2008
- Genre: Alternative rock
- Length: 5:05
- Label: Self-released
- Songwriter: Paul Westerberg

On August 6, 2008, Westerberg released the song "5:05" on Tunecore, allowing users to pay either 99 cents or $5.05. Together, these two downloads make 49 minutes of music.
