= The Resterberg =

Compilation album by Paul Westerberg
- Released: May 17, 2005
- Genre: Alternative rock
- Length: 29:12
- Label: Warner Bros.
- Producer: Paul Westerberg

Paul Westerberg chronology
Besterberg: The Best of Paul Westerberg (2005)	The Resterberg (2005)	49:00... Of Your Time/Life (2008)

The Resterberg is a compilation album of former Replacements frontman Paul Westerberg's solo work.

It was released the same day as Besterberg: The Best of Paul Westerberg (May 17, 2005), and is essentially an edited version of it. With the exception of Westerberg's cover of The Beatles' "Nowhere Man" from the I Am Sam soundtrack, it contains every song from Besterberg that was not taken from an original Westerberg album. Both albums use the same font & the same cover photo.

== Track listing ==
All tracks are written by Paul Westerberg.

No.	Title	Length
1.	"Dyslexic Heart"	4:31
2.	"Seein' Her" (Single Version)	2:58
3.	"Man Without Ties" (Single Version)	3:28
4.	"A Star Is Bored"	3:55
5.	"Stain Yer Blood" (Single Version)	3:03
6.	"Once Around the Weekend" (Alternate Mix)	4:06
7.	"All That I Had" (Outtake)	4:27
8.	"C'mon, C'mon, C'mon" (Explicit)	2:44
Total length:		29:12
