= Dead Man Shake =

Studio album by Paul Westerberg
- Released: October 21, 2003
- Studio: Westerberg's basement studio
- Genres: Alternative rock, Blues rock
- Length: 46:28
- Label: Fat Possum Records
- Producer: Paul Westerberg

Paul Westerberg chronology
Come Feel Me Tremble (2003)	Dead Man Shake (2003)	Folker (2004)

Dead Man Shake is a 2003 album on Fat Possum Records by former Replacements frontman Paul Westerberg under the pseudonym "Grandpaboy." It was released the same day as Come Feel Me Tremble, an album Westerberg released under his proper name on Vagrant Records.

== Critical reception ==
Reviews for Dead Man Shake were generally negative. As was his way, Westerberg recorded the entire album by himself in his basement with no outside help. AllMusic's Mark Deming noted that Dead Man Shake seemed to be put together from Westerberg's B-list material. Amanda Petrusich of Pitchfork notes that "The album sees Westerberg abandoning his own well-imitated chops for the super-derivative, ever-repeating blues-rock paradigm." Trouser Press' Ira Robbins & Evan Thomas called Dead Man Shake "a shambolic, blues-based record that will repel purists of the 12-bar form but delight anyone who brings a six-pack and a cockeyed sense of humor to the party."

Punk Rock News' Adam White was more kind: "If you fail to see the charm in dirty old blues standards recorded in a single "warts-and-all" take, you're missing what makes Dead Man Shake so enjoyable."

== Track listing ==
All tracks are written by Paul Westerberg, under the pseudonym "Winthrope Marion Percival V," unless otherwise indicated.

No.	Title	Writer(s)	Length
1.	"MPLS"		3:54
2.	"Do Right in Your Eyes"		1:49
3.	"Vampires & Failures"		3:31
4.	"No Matter What You Say"	Traditional, Arranged by Winthrope Marion Percival V	5:46
5.	"Take Out Some Insurance"	Charles Singleton, Waldenese J. Hall	2:39
6.	"Cleaning House"		2:31
7.	"Natural Mean Lover"	Elrod Puce	2:18
8.	"Get A Move On"		3:28
9.	"Bad Boy Blues"		2:52
10.	"Souvenirs"	John Prine	3:41
11.	"I'm So Lonesome I Could Cry"	Hank Williams	2:39
12.	"O.D. Blues"		4:32
13.	"Dead Man Shake"		3:36
14.	"What Kind of Fool Am I?"	Anthony Newley, Leslie Bricusse	3:12
Total length:			46:28

For some reason, Westerberg chose to give songwriting credit for "Natural Mean Lover" to another of his pseudonyms, Elrod Puce.
