= 3oclockreep =

Studio album by Paul Westerberg
- Released: September 1, 2008
- Recorded: 1988 (The Replacements material), 2008
- Genres: Alternative rock, college rock
- Length: 23:15
- Language: English
- Label: Self-released
- Producer: Matt Wallace (The Replacements material)

Paul Westerberg chronology
49:00... Of Your Time/Life (2008)	3oclockreep (2008)	PW & The Ghost Gloves Cat Wing Joy Boys (2009)

3oclockreep is a 2008 album from Paul Westerberg. It includes material recorded with the Replacements for 1989's Don't Tell a Soul. The album was released on September 1, 2008, on TuneCore for $3.99; users could also purchase the tracks separately for $3.00 and 99 cents respectively.

== Reception ==
Writing for PunkNews, Chris Arena gave this album 3.5 out of 5 stars, calling it, "a breath of fresh air to hear music that relies more on the strength of the songs and the abilities of the writer than of how good the "sound" is".

== Track listing ==
1. "3oclockreep" – 20:15
2. "Finally Here Once" – 3:00

While 30clockreep does not have an official track listing for the title track, a tentative one has been made:

1. "Tell 'Em All, Go to Hell" 2:49
2. "Mash of Outtakes" 0:44
3. "It's Ridiculous, Everybody Wants to Be Famous" 2:53
4. "Only Excuse Is" 2:15
5. "You're Still Mine" 1:05
6. "If Only You Were Lonely" 1:00
7. "Studio Ramblings" 1:15
8. "We Know the Night" 3:06
9. "Lowdown Monkey Blues" 5:08

The latter four feature Tom Waits.

== Personnel ==
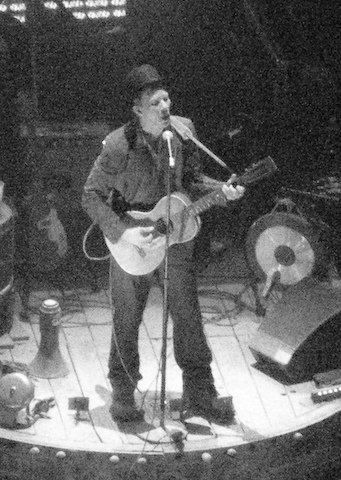
Vocals by Tom Waits from 1988 were included on 3olcockreep

- Chris Mars – drums
- Slim Dunlap – lead guitar
- Tommy Stinson – bass guitar
- Tom Waits – vocals
- Paul Westerberg – vocals and guitar
