= Mary Lucia =

American radio personality (born 1970)

Mary Lucia (born August 6, 1970, in Newton, Massachusetts) is a former on-air radio personality who hosted a weekday drive time music show for Minnesota Public Radio station 89.3 The Current in St. Paul, Minnesota. She currently works as a program advisor to Radio K, the student run radio station at the University of Minnesota. She is the sister of musician Paul Westerberg.

== Career ==
Known particularly for her unorthodox conversational style of interviewing, Lucia has interviewed Trent Reznor, Studs Terkel, Noel Gallagher, Robbie Robertson, Suzi Quatro, Iggy Pop, Chrissie Hynde, Jack White, Johnny Rotten, John Waters, Chuck D, Richard Hell, Bob Gruen, and Amy Sedaris.

After Disney purchased Rev 105 and changed its name and format, Lucia maintained her dual role as host of a regular day-shift as well as a local music show called "Popular Creeps" (named after a song by former Replacements drummer Chris Mars). After Steve Nelson left the morning show that he co-hosted with Brian Oake, Lucia was paired with Oake for morning drive time.

When Disney changed the format again to rhythmic oldies, the entire air staff, including Lucia, was fired. Lucia went on to host a program on AM 1500 and to cameo on KLBB before being picked up by Minnesota Public Radio in January 2005.

Lucia has also appeared in commercials, live theater productions, done professional voice-over work since the age of 18, freelanced for the Minnesota publication The Rake for 5 years, and appeared in the indie film The Last Word (2003). She also appeared in Phil Harders award-winning film Tuscaloosa (2020).

Lucia was the audiobook narrator for Bob Mehr's Best Selling biography "Trouble Boys: The Story of the Replacements".

Since 2005 she has produced and organized a yearly benefit for Feline Rescue at the First Ave Main Room, in a musical tribute to David Bowie called "Rock for Pussy".

On November 25th, 2025 Lucia's memoir titled, What Doesn't Kill Me Makes Me Weirder and Harder to Relate To was published through the University of Minnesota Press. Her memoir details her experience as a survivor of stalking while also connecting to her broader life experiences from her youth to becoming a public figure.

== Personal life ==
She is the younger sister of rock musician Paul Westerberg of the Replacements.
