= Paul Westerberg =

American musician (born 1959)

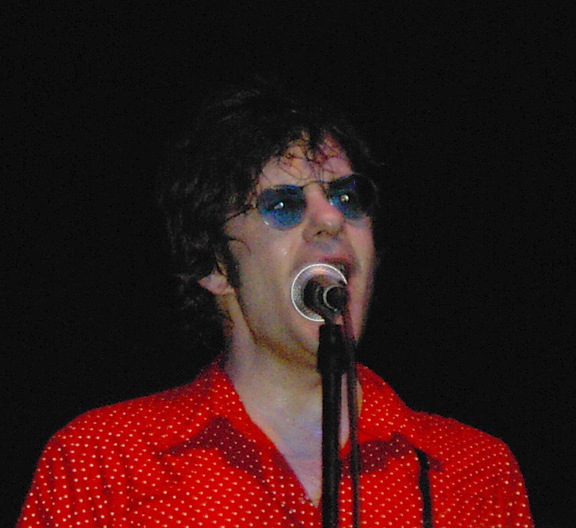
- Westerberg in 2005

Background information
- Born: Paul Harold Westerberg; December 31, 1959 (age 66); Minneapolis, Minnesota, U.S.
- Genres: Alternative rock; punk rock (early)
- Occupations: Musician; songwriter
- Instruments: Guitar; vocals; bass guitar; piano; drums; harmonica
- Years active: 1979–present
- Labels: Sire; Reprise; Vagrant; Fat Possum

Paul Harold Westerberg (born December 31, 1959) is an American musician, best known as the lead singer, guitarist, and songwriter for the Replacements. Following the breakup of the Replacements, Westerberg launched a solo career that saw him release three albums on two major record labels.

Following the release of his third solo album, Westerberg has been mostly releasing music that he has self-produced and recorded in his basement home studio. He has also released two albums and an EP under the pseudonym Grandpaboy. In 2017, Westerberg released songs on SoundCloud as User 964848511 and on Bandcamp as Dry Wood Garage.

== Career ==
=== The Replacements ===
In the late 1970s, Westerberg was working as a janitor for U.S. Senator David Durenberger, and one day while walking home from work, he heard a band practicing Yes's "Roundabout" in a basement. He talked his way into the band by convincing the singer that the other band members — Bob Stinson, Chris Mars and Tommy Stinson — were going to fire the singer. The singer quit, and Westerberg joined the group. The band was originally called the Impediments, and they played their first gig in the basement of a church, playing to members of a nearby halfway house who did not appreciate their drunken shenanigans. They soon changed their name to the Replacements after several venues declined to advertise the band under their original name.

The Replacements began performing in the Twin Cities punk scene, showcasing Westerberg's songs in a classic rock–friendly punk style. The band made three albums and an EP for local label Twin/Tone before signing to Sire Records in 1985. They made four albums for Sire, each with a different lineup.

Despite the jump to Sire, the Replacements never translated their critical success into commercial sales. The band broke up in 1991. Their final album, All Shook Down, was mainly a Westerberg solo project; there were a number of guest performers and the other three members of the band (including Slim Dunlap, who had replaced Bob Stinson three years earlier to tour in support of Pleased to Meet Me), made minimal contributions. Mars left the band soon after the album was released. After touring for the album (which was critically well-received) with replacement Replacements, Westerberg and bassist Tommy Stinson went their separate ways.

The Replacements reunited in 2012, playing several dates at Riot Fest in 2013 and the Coachella Music Festival in 2014. The Replacements once again disbanded in 2015.

=== Solo work ===
Westerberg's first solo releases were two songs, "Waiting for Somebody" and "Dyslexic Heart", for the soundtrack to the 1992 Cameron Crowe film Singles, for which he is also credited with composing and performing the score. The following year, Reprise Records released his first solo album, 14 Songs. Even though the Replacements had been banned for life from Saturday Night Live after a notoriously chaotic 1986 performance, Westerberg was invited back in 1993 as a solo artist while touring in support of the album. Ironically, one of his two featured songs on SNL was the Replacements tune "Can't Hardly Wait."

During the interim between solo albums, Westerberg's songs appeared on Melrose Place ("A Star Is Bored") and Friends (his cover of Jonathan Edwards' "Sunshine" and "Stain Yer Blood") television soundtracks, in 1994 and 1995 respectively.

Westerberg co-wrote the song "Backlash" with Joan Jett for her 1991 album Notorious and played guitar with her on the song's video. He also recorded a duet with Jett ("Let's Do It") for the Tank Girl soundtrack (1994).

In 1996, he released his second solo album, titled Eventually, which was tepidly received by critics and had modest sales. It yielded the alternative radio hit "Love Untold." Westerberg parted ways with Reprise Records, and the following year chose to release songs that were more blues-influenced and less slickly produced under the name Grandpaboy. An EP and single were released by indie label Soundproof/Monolyth Records. His third album, Suicaine Gratifaction, is a piano-driven, melancholy, and highly personal work that was released on Capitol Records in 1999. The label was undergoing reorganization and the album was given minimal promotion. Westerberg appeared on a fifth-season episode of The Larry Sanders Show (entitled "Larry's New Love") performing "Ain't Got Me" from Eventually. The episode first aired on February 26, 1997. Westerberg also performed the song that same year on The Tonight Show hosted by Jay Leno.

Westerberg quit the major-label circuit for three years before staging a comeback in 2002. With new management and a new independent label, Vagrant Records, he released two records simultaneously, Stereo and Mono (Mono being released under his alter ego Grandpaboy). Stereo and Mono were recorded in Westerberg's basement studio. Westerberg became increasingly prolific, releasing Dead Man Shake (as Grandpaboy), Come Feel Me Tremble, and Folker all within the next two years.

Westerberg contributed a cover of the Beatles' "Nowhere Man" for the 2002 soundtrack to the 2001 film I Am Sam. Additionally, "Lookin' Up in Heaven" appears on the Starbucks sampler Hear Music, Vol. 10: Reveal, "Outta My System" can be found on Hot Stove, Cool Music, Vol. 1, and the Vagrant Records sampler Another Year on the Streets, Vol. 3 features "As Far As I Know." All three compilations were released in 2004.

In December 2005, Westerberg reconvened with Tommy Stinson and Chris Mars to record two new songs for the Replacements' compilation titled Don't You Know Who I Think I Was?, which was released in 2006.

In 2006, Westerberg wrote eight original songs for the animated film Open Season. Two of the songs were covered by other artists. The track "Wild As I Wanna Be" is performed by Deathray, whereas Pete Yorn performs "I Belong (Reprise)." In addition, Tommy Stinson is featured playing bass on the songs "Love You in the Fall" and "Right to Arm Bears." The soundtrack also includes the song "Good Day" from Westerberg's solo album Eventually.

After he was seen on stage playing a First Act production model guitar, Westerberg collaborated with the Boston-based guitar manufacturer in September 2006 to create his signature edition PW580 with a red plaid pickguard.

On July 21, 2008, Westerberg released an album with 49 minutes' worth of music for 49 cents. The album, 49:00... Of Your Time/Life, was taken down from Amazon.com and TuneCore store a few weeks later. In its place, Westerberg released a song titled "5:05" (a reference to the fact that 49:00 was really 43:55 long, 5:05 shorter than 49:00). From the lyrical content of "5:05," it is believed that 49:00 was recalled because of copyright issues in the ending cover medley.

On August 27, 2008, Westerberg released two new songs, "3oclockreep" and "Finally Here Once", on TuneCore. On September 13, 2008, another new song, "Bored of Edukation," was released as an MP3 download on Amazon.com. On December 24, 2008, Westerberg released three songs; "Always in a Manger", the folk music standard "Streets of Laredo", and "D.G.T." on tunecore.com for $0.74. On September 22, 2009, Westerberg released an EP titled PW & The Ghost Gloves Cat Wing Joy Boys with six songs: "Ghost on the Canvas," "Drop Them Gloves," "Good as the Cat," "Love on the Wing", "Gimmie Little Joy" and "Dangerous Boys".

Following the March 2010 death of his chief musical influence Alex Chilton, Westerberg wrote a eulogy for Chilton that appeared in The New York Times. In May 2010, he played "Dangerous Boys" and "Time Flies Tomorrow" standing on the visitors' dugout at Target Field for the documentary 40 Nights of Rock & Roll. Westerberg appeared in the video for the title track of Glen Campbell's 2011 farewell studio recording, a cover of "Ghost on the Canvas" (which Westerberg wrote in 2009). In the May 24, 2013 online version of The New York Times' Measure for Measure feature, he set forth his songwriting creed, which privileges the virtues of inspiration and spontaneity over gradually developing and revising a song.

In 2014, a new Westerberg song,“How I Met Your Mother”, was played over the end credits of the series finale of the television show How I Met Your Mother (season 9). The song was later available through most major streaming services.

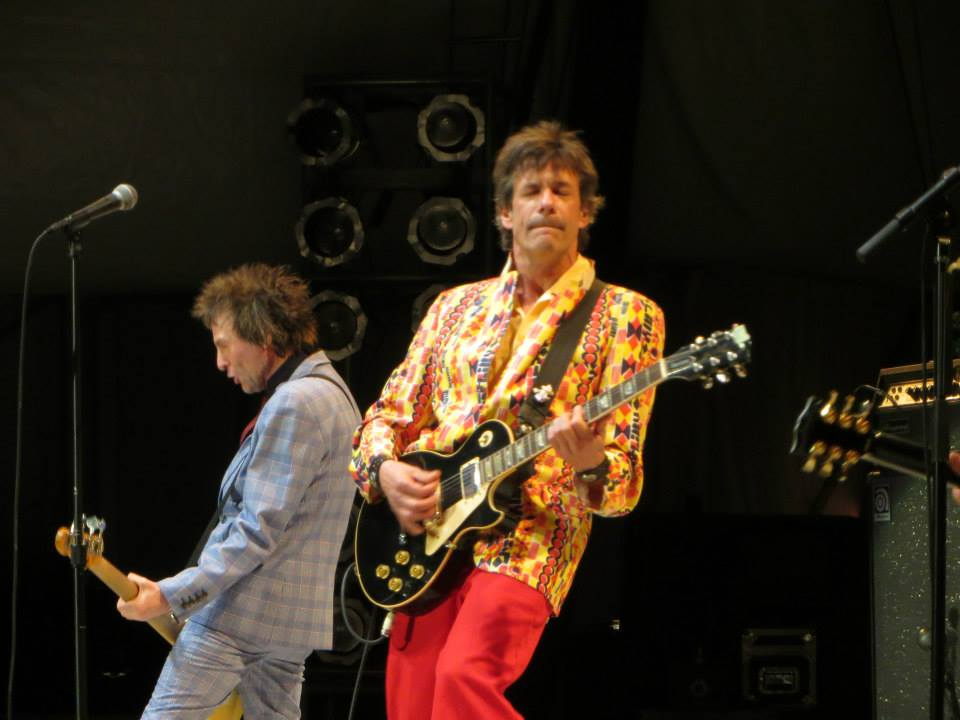
Paul Westerberg playing with the Replacements at Forest Hills Stadium in Queens, New York, in 2014

In late 2015, Westerberg announced that he had formed a new band called the I Don't Cares with musician Juliana Hatfield. Their debut album, Wild Stab, was released in January 2016.

== Personal life ==
Westerberg was born in Minneapolis, Minnesota, the son of Mary Louise (née Philipp) (1923-2024) and Harold ("Hal") Robert Westerberg (1918–2003), an employee of Cadillac-General Motors. He has four siblings: Anne, Julie, Phil, and Mary. He grew up Catholic.

He married his first wife, Lori Bizer, in 1987. After their divorce, he married former pianist and author Laurie Lindeen on August 26, 2003. They divorced in 2014. Lindeen, who was described by First Avenue as "a dominant force in the '80s and '90s female rock movement in Minneapolis," died in 2024.

He and Lindeen have a son, Johnny (born 1998), whose voice is likely on 49:00 and "Whatever Makes You Happy" from Westerberg's solo album Suicaine Gratifaction.

Westerberg severely injured his fretting hand in 2006 in an accident while trying to remove candle wax with a screwdriver, leaving his ring finger on his left hand numb.

Westerberg resides in Edina, Minnesota, a suburb of Minneapolis.

His younger sister, Mary Lucia, was a DJ at local radio station 89.3 The Current for many years.

Westerberg has had problems with alcoholism but overcame his addiction in 1990. He has since resumed drinking occasionally in moderation.

== Honors and awards ==
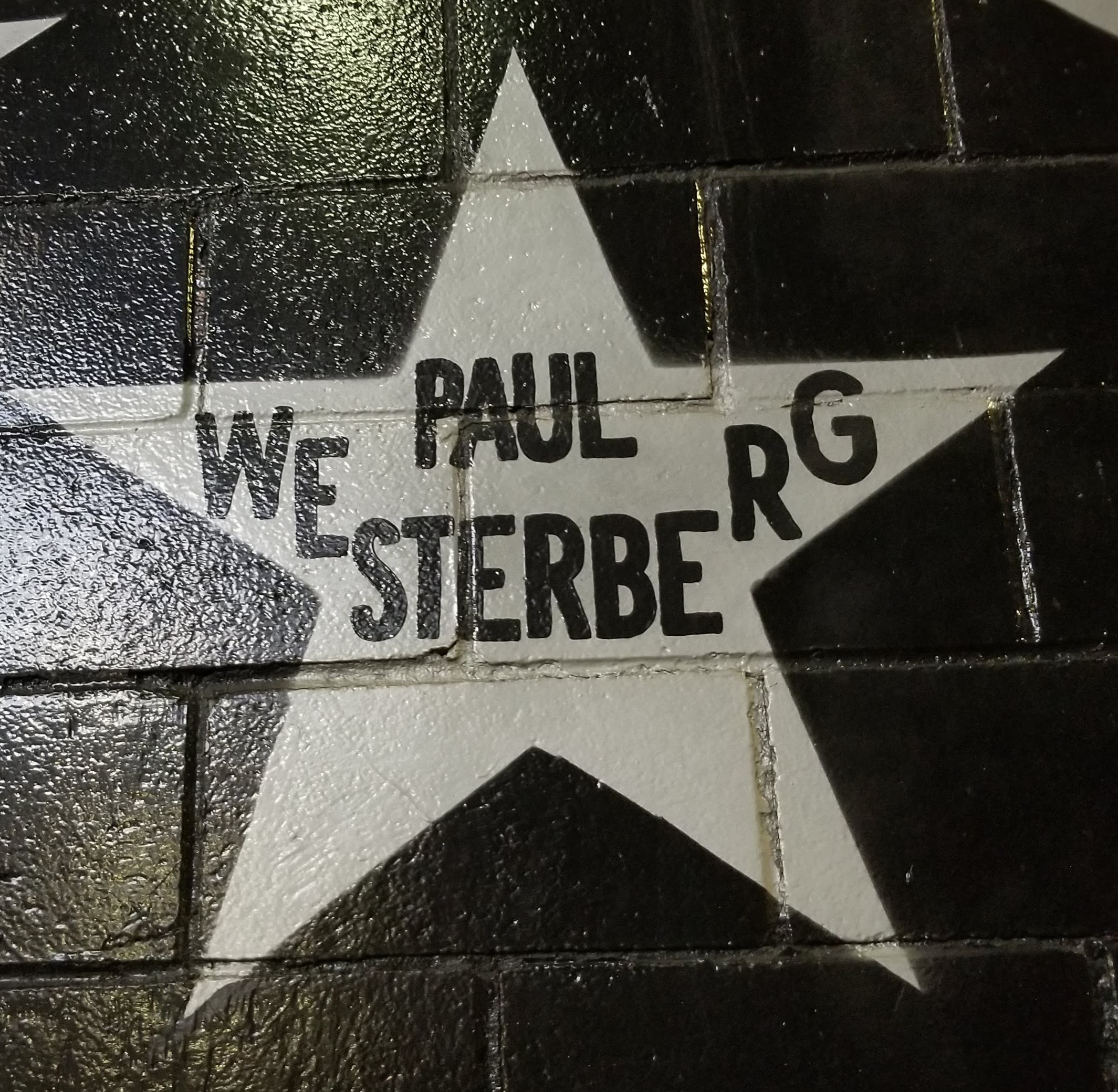
Westerberg's star on the outside mural of Minneapolis nightclub First Avenue

Westerberg has been honored with two stars on the outside mural of the Minneapolis nightclub First Avenue, recognizing performers that have played sold-out shows or have otherwise demonstrated a major contribution to the culture at the iconic venue. Westerberg and the Replacements each have a star on the mural, making Westerberg one of the few musicians to be honored with multiple stars. Receiving a star "might be the most prestigious public honor an artist can receive in Minneapolis," according to journalist Steve Marsh.

In 2023, Rolling Stone ranked Westerberg at number 196 on its list of the 200 Greatest Singers of All Time.

== Discography ==
=== The Replacements ===
- Sorry Ma, Forgot to Take Out the Trash (Twin/Tone, 1981)
- Stink (EP) (Twin/Tone. 1982)
- Hootenanny (Twin/Tone, 1983)
- Let It Be (Twin/Tone, 1984)
- Tim (Sire, 1985)
- Pleased to Meet Me (Sire, 1987)
- Don't Tell a Soul (Sire, 1989)
- All Shook Down (Sire, 1990)
- Songs for Slim (New West Records, 2013)

=== Solo ===
- 14 Songs (Sire/Reprise Records, 1993)
- Eventually (Reprise Records, 1996)
- Suicaine Gratifaction (EMI/Capitol, 1999)
- Stereo (Vagrant Records, 2002)
- Come Feel Me Tremble (Vagrant Records, 2003)
- Folker (Vagrant Records, 2004)
- PW & The Ghost Gloves Cat Wing Joy Boys EP (Dry Wood Music, 2009)

=== Studio albums as Grandpaboy ===
- Grandpaboy: Grandpaboy (EP) (Soundproof/Monolyth, 1997)
- Grandpaboy: Mono (Vagrant Records 2002)
- Grandpaboy: Dead Man Shake (Fat Possum, 2003)

=== Digital Only ===
- AOL Sessions EP (AOL, 2004)
- 49:00... Of Your Time/Life album (Self-released, 2008)
- "5:05" song (Self-released, 2008)
- 3oclockreep EP (Self-released, 2008)
- "Bored of Edukation" song (Self-released, 2008)
- D.G.T. EP (Self-released, 2008
- Grandpaboy's Last Stand EP as Mr. F (Self-released, 2010)
- "My Road Now" song (Self-released, 2012)
- four songs on Bandcamp as Dry Wood Garage (Self-released, 2017)
- eight songs on SoundCloud as User 964848511 (Self-released, 2017)

=== The I Don't Cares ===
- Wild Stab (Dry Wood Music, 2016)

=== Singles (Physical Media) ===
Year	Single	US Alt	Album
1992	"Dyslexic Heart"	4	Singles: Original Motion Picture Soundtrack
1992	"Janet’s Sneeze" (instrumental non-album track)	—	Singles: Original Motion Picture Soundtrack
1993	"World Class Fad"	4	14 Songs
1993	"Runaway Wind"	—	14 Songs
1993	"Knockin On Mine"	—	14 Songs
1993	"Dice Behind Your Shaded" (Festicle Version non-album track)	—	14 Songs
1993	"Man Without Ties" (non-album track)	—	14 Songs
1993	"Seein’ Her" (non-album track)	—	14 Songs
1995	"Let's Do It" (with Joan Jett)	—	Tank Girl Motion Picture Soundtrack
1996	"Love Untold"	21	Eventually
1996	"Ain't Got Me"	—	Eventually
1996	"Make Your Own Kind Of Music" (non-album track)	—	Eventually
1996	"Hide N' Seekin"	—	Eventually
1997	"I Want My Money Back"	—	Released as Grandpaboy (single only)
1997	"Undone"	—	Released as Grandpaboy (single only)
1999	"Lookin' Out Forever"	—	Suicaine Gratifaction
1999	"Whatever Makes You Happy"	—	Suicaine Gratifaction
2006	"Love You in the Fall"	—	Open Season Motion Picture Soundtrack
2009	"Ghost on the Canvas"	—	PW & the Ghost Gloves Cat Wing Joy Boys
2010	"This Machine"	—	Released as Mr. F (single only)
2010	"Foolish Handshake"	—	Released as Mr. F (single only)

=== DVD ===
- Come Feel Me Tremble – Redline Entertainment/Ventura Distribution (2003)

=== Soundtracks and compilations ===
- Singles: Original Motion Picture Soundtrack (1992) – "Dyslexic Heart" and "Waiting for Somebody" (Westerberg also scored the soundtrack)
- Melrose Place soundtrack (1995) – "A Star Is Bored"
- Friends Soundtrack (1995) – "Sunshine" and "Stain Yer Blood"
- Tank Girl soundtrack (1995) – "Let's Do It" with Joan Jett
- I Am Sam soundtrack (2002) – "Nowhere Man" (The Beatles cover)
- Uncut Magazine Hard Rain Vol. 2 - A Tribute to Bob Dylan (2002) - "Positively 4th Street" (Bob Dylan cover)
- triplearadio.com Sampler 5 (2003) – "My Daydream"
- Hear Music, Vol. 10: Reveal (Starbucks sampler, 2004) – "Lookin' Up in Heaven"
- Hot Stove, Cool Music, Vol. 1 (2004) – "Outta My System"
- Another Year on the Streets, Vol. 3 (Vagrant Records sampler, 2004) – "As Far as I Know"
- The Wired CD: Rip. Sample. Mash. Share. (2004) – "Looking Up in Heaven"
- Besterberg: The Best of Paul Westerberg (Rhino, 2005)
- The Resterberg (Warner Bros., 2005)
- Uncut Magazine Highway 61 Revisited Revisited (2005) - "It Takes a Lot to Laugh, It Takes a Train to Cry" (Bob Dylan cover)
- Open Season: Featuring the songs of Paul Westerberg (Lost Highway Records, 2006)
- For New Orleans (2006) – "Old Money" (under the alias PW & the Honky Heartattax)
- Catch and Release (2007) – "Let the Bad Times Roll"
- How I Met Your Mother (2014) – "How I Met Your Mother"
