= Mark Wheat =

Mark Wheat in 2019

Mark Wheat is an English entrepreneur, known primarily for his time working at the Minnesota Public Radio station KCMP (the Current) where he provided one of the outlet's unique voices because of his background.

Wheat grew up in the small town of Clenchwarton, near King's Lynn, Norfolk, England, where he dreamed of becoming a radio host while listening to British DJ John Peel. He attended the University of Leeds while members of The Gang of Four were seniors and during the time The Mekons formed. David Gedge of The Wedding Present also entered the university at the same time, although Wheat didn't meet him until an interview years later.

His first radio break came when offered the chance to guest on the Big Joe Wilson show on CXR Hospital Radio alongside Karl ‘The Teaman’ Warkus, KY’s Doodie Watson Jones and the Fruit Poets — Fringer Turner and Chucky C Farren.

Before settling in Minnesota in 1992, Wheat lived in St Louis, Missouri; North Carolina; and Hoboken, New Jersey.

While living in the area of New York City, Wheat became interested in the WFMU radio station in New Jersey, and spent some time there. He eventually moved to the Twin Cities region of Minnesota where he became heavily involved in the local music scene and did radio shows on KFAI and the short-lived Rev 105 (now known as Love 105). During the mid to late 1990s, he hosted Local Sound Department on KFAI, and also worked at Zone where he did a show named Across the Pond which focused on what was happening back in the United Kingdom.

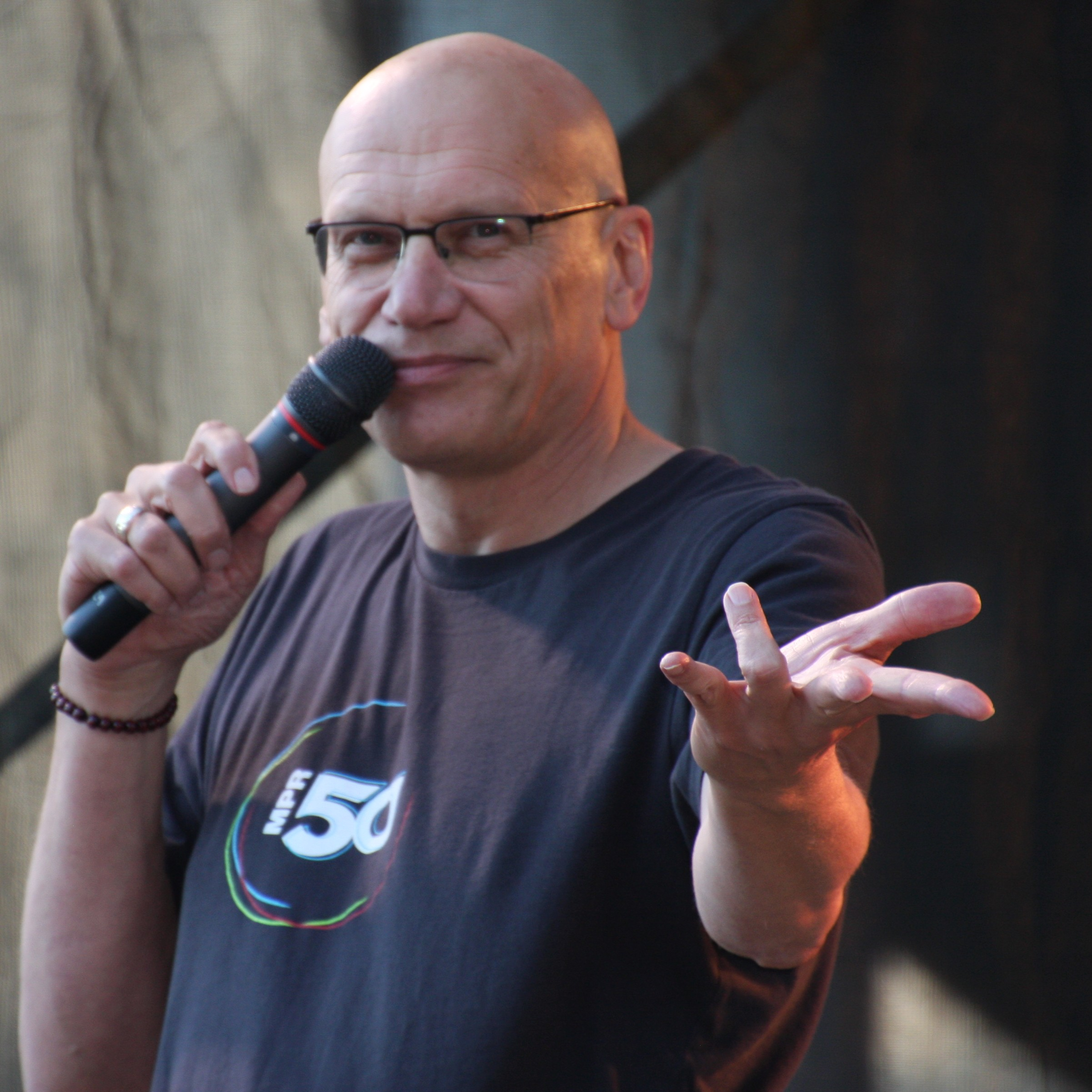
Wheat in 2017

In 1998, he was hired to work at the University of Minnesota's music station, 770 Radio K (KUOM), which is one of the most popular college radio stations in the country. Wheat spent six years at the station, acting as program coach, DJ, and host of the weekend show The Music Lover's Club. He became so identified with Radio K that he was inadvertently labeled in the local press as head of the station. However, Wheat was just part of a small full-time staff that oversees students who do much of the work at the station. As his time there came to an end, Wheat expressed confidence in the ability of the students to continue the station's mission.

Wheat made a significant move in 2005, leaving 770 AM for a new station that was being started by Minnesota Public Radio. KCMP 89.3 FM is an "eclectic" music station, playing a wide variety of different music, which has a somewhat similar format as KUOM.

Wheat has related a number of different personal stories in between playing songs on the radio. One unusual occurrence happened when he was living in St. Louis, Missouri. Some of his friends convinced The Minutemen to come and make a personal performance on his birthday. He has also mentioned that many people—even in his home country—mistake his accent for Australian. This is somewhat to be expected, though, since he has now spent decades in the United States.

Several awards have been granted to Mark Wheat in recognition of his talents. For instance, he won the City Pages readers' poll for "Best AM Radio Personality" in the 2004 Best of the Twin Cities awards.

On Sept. 6, 2012, Wheat became a naturalized U.S. citizen; he is now a dual citizen of Great Britain and the United States.

On June 2, 2020 Mark Wheat announced that he would be departing from KCMP (the Current). "I've decided, given the times we're in, to take the plunge and follow my dreams. The company has been extremely supportive during this period of transition, and we agreed on all the logistics and timing," he said in a statement posted to the radio station's website.

Having retired from radio, Wheat moved to Colorado to take yoga teacher training from the founder of Avita Yoga, Jeff Bailey. Wheat went on to teach classes at the Yoga Loft. Wheat returned to Minnesota in February 2022 and started teaching Avita Yoga at the Yoga Center Retreat in St. Louis Park.
