= Grandpaboy (EP) =

EP by Paul Westerberg
- Released: July 1997
- Studio: Westerberg's basement studio
- Genre: Alternative rock
- Length: 13:37
- Labels: Soundproof; Monolyth Records
- Producer: Paul Westerberg

Paul Westerberg chronology
Eventually (1996)	Grandpaboy (1997)	Suicaine Gratifaction (1999)

Grandpaboy is an EP on Soundproof Records by former Replacements frontman Paul Westerberg under the pseudonym "Grandpaboy".

With his 1996 album Eventually having sold poorly, he was dropped by Reprise Records. While between labels, he decided to release some material as Grandpaboy in order to protect his anonymity.

== Track listing ==
All tracks are written by Paul Westerberg.

No.	Title	Length
1.	"Hot Un"	2:30
2.	"Ain't Done Much"	2:46
3.	"Psychopharmacology"	2:36
4.	"Lush and Green"	2:53
5.	"Homelessexual"	2:52
Total length:		13:37

== Personnel ==
The EP was mastered by Bob Ludwig. Beyond that, the 'credits' are simply different pseudonyms for Westerberg:

- Winthrope Marion Percival V. - Songwriter
- Grandpaboy – Guitar, Vocals. Artwork (All Drawings & Collages)
- Thaddeus Moonbeam – Saxophone
- Zeke Pine – Bass guitar
- Elrod Puce – Handclaps, Backing Vocals
- Henry Twiddle – Drums
- Recorded by Rory Gilligan
