= Suicaine Gratifaction =

Studio album by Paul Westerberg
- Released: February 23, 1999
- Genre: Alternative rock
- Length: 45:08
- Label: Capitol
- Producers: Paul Westerberg, Don Was

Paul Westerberg chronology
Grandpaboy (EP) (1996)	Suicaine Gratifaction (1999)	Stereo (2002)

Professional ratings
Review scores
Source	Rating
AllMusic	3/5 stars

Suicaine Gratifaction is the third solo album from former Replacements leader Paul Westerberg, and his first with Capitol Records after losing his deal with Reprise.

Co-producer Don Was had admired Westerberg for years. He used Westerberg's solo debut, 14 Songs, as daily inspiration while producing the Rolling Stones' Voodoo Lounge. Westerberg once claimed that he had originally been interested in working with Quincy Jones.

Regarding the album's strange title, Westerberg said, "I don't want to think about it too deeply other than the fact that it seems wrong, and therefore it's attractive to me."

The piano solo in the middle of "Born for Me" is the subject of a chapter within Nick Hornby's Songbook, where its simply played, undemonstrative character, of a piece with the song as a whole, is contrasted with virtuosic solos that use the underlying song as a jumping-off point to some unrelated destination. Hornby describes Westerberg as a "born musician" and suggests that he's "a man who thinks and feels and loves and speaks in music." "Born for Me" was rerecorded on I Don't Cares' 2016 album, Wild Stab.

== Track listing ==
All tracks are written by Paul Westerberg, unless otherwise indicated.

Side 1
No.	Title	Length
1.	"It's a Wonderful Lie"	2:47
2.	"Self-Defense"	3:15
3.	"Best Thing That Never Happened"	4:31
4.	"Lookin' Out Forever"	3:41
5.	"Born for Me"	4:00
6.	"Final Hurrah"	3:27

Side 2
No.	Title	Length
7.	"Tears Rolling Up Our Sleeves"	3:26
8.	"Fugitive Kind"	5:54
9.	"Sunrise Always Listens"	4:17
10.	"Whatever Makes You Happy"	3:15
11.	"Actor in the Street"	3:24
12.	"Bookmark"	3:11
Total length:		45:08

Bonus Track Europe
No.	Title	Writer(s)	Length
13.	"Wonderful Copenhagen"	Frank Loesser	2:50

Bonus Track Japan
No.	Title	Length
13.	"33rd of July"	3:00

== Personnel ==
- Paul Westerberg – guitar, vocals
- Shawn Colvin – vocals
- Don Was – bass
- Steve Ferrone – drums
- Josh Freese – drums
- Suzie Katayama – accordion, cello
- Jim Keltner – drums, percussion
- Abe Laboriel Jr. – drums
- Greg Leisz – pedal steel guitar
- Benmont Tench – keyboards
- Richard Todd – French horn
- Dave Pirner – backing vocals
