= KDXL =

Radio station at St. Louis Park High School (1977–2018)

- St. Louis Park, Minnesota; United States
- Broadcast area: Minneapolis-St. Paul area
- Frequency: 106.5 MHz

Ownership
- Owner: Independent School District #283

History
- First air date: March 17, 1977
- Last air date: July 1, 2018
- Former call signs: KSLP
- Call sign meaning: KD Extra Large

Technical information
- Facility ID: 28505
- Class: D
- ERP: 8 watts
- HAAT: 26 meters (85 ft)
- Transmitter coordinates: 44°56′36″N 93°21′39″W

KDXL (106.5 FM) was a student operated radio station at St. Louis Park High School in St. Louis Park, Minnesota. The station's frequency was 106.5, which it shared with the University of Minnesota's KUOM-FM in a timesharing agreement. The station was owned by Independent School District #283.

== History ==
The station began in 1973 with a low-power signal that could only reach a portion of St. Louis Park High School; during this period, the station used the call signs WHAT, WSLP, and KTS. In 1977, the Federal Communications Commission (FCC) granted the school district a license to operate a 10-watt radio station, which took the call sign KDXL. KDXL operated at 91.7 through 1985; it changed frequencies so that it would not have a frequency close to KQRS-FM.

Independent School District #283 voted to shut down KDXL on June 25, 2018; the following day, it informed the FCC that the station would cease operations on July 1. The license was cancelled on July 16, 2018.
