= PW & The Ghost Gloves Cat Wing Joy Boys =

EP by Paul Westerberg
- Released: September 22, 2009
- Studio: Westerberg's basement studio
- Genre: Folk rock
- Length: 24:13
- Label: Dry Wood Music
- Producer: Paul Westerberg

Paul Westerberg chronology
Folker (2004)	PW & The Ghost Gloves Cat Wing Joy Boys (2009)	Wild Stab (2015)

PW & The Ghost Gloves Cat Wing Joy Boys is an EP by former Replacements frontman Paul Westerberg. It was the first CD format release by Westerberg since 2004's Folker.

As was his way, Westerberg wrote & recorded the EP by himself in his basement with no outside help, and released it on his own Dry Wood Music record label.

== Track listing ==
No.	Title	Length
1.	"Ghost on the Canvas"	3:41
2.	"Drop Them Gloves"	3:44
3.	"Good as The Cat"	3:43
4.	"Love on the Wing"	5:28
5.	"Gimmie Little Joy"	4:11
6.	"Dangerous Boys"	3:24
Total length:		24:13
