= Laurie Lindeen =

American musician and writer (1961/1962–2024)

Laurie Lindeen (1961/1962 – July 1, 2024) was an American musician, writer and university professor.

== Early life ==
Lindeen was born in Madison, Wisconsin. She was the daughter of Lance and Carol Lindeen, having two sisters (Megan and Hillary) and a brother (Chris).

== Career ==
In 1987, Lindeen left Wisconsin and began a music career in Minneapolis, Minnesota. She became the singer and guitarist for the all-female rock band Zuzu's Petals. The band recruited drummer Linda Pitmon, and released two albums in the early 1990s.

Lindeen later began a writing career, earning a master's degree in creative writing from the University of Minnesota. She taught writing and literature at the University of St. Thomas, St. Cloud State University, The Loft Literary Center and various local schools. In 2007, she wrote the memoir Petal Pusher: A Rock and Roll Cinderella Story.

== Personal life ==
In the 1980s, Lindeen was diagnosed with multiple sclerosis.

Lindeen was married to The Replacements musician Paul Westerberg. The couple had a son together. In 2022, Lindeen and her partner Jim moved from Minnesota to Martha's Vineyard. While living there, she worked part-time in a bookstore. She died of a brain aneurysm on July 1, 2024.
