= Eventually (album) =

Studio album by Paul Westerberg
- Released: April 30, 1996
- Genre: Alternative rock
- Length: 45:55
- Language: English
- Label: Reprise
- Producers: Lou Giordano, Brendan O'Brien

Paul Westerberg chronology
14 Songs (1993)	Eventually (1996)	Grandpaboy (EP) (1996)

Singles from Eventually
- 1. "Love Untold" Released: 1996

Professional ratings
Review scores
Source	Rating
AllMusic	2/5 stars
Christgau's Consumer Guide	(2-star Honorable Mention)
Entertainment Weekly	C+
Los Angeles Times	3/4 stars
Orlando Sentinel	2/4 stars
Rolling Stone	3/5 stars
Spin	6/10

Eventually is the second solo album by former Replacements frontman Paul Westerberg, released on April 30, 1996, on Reprise Records.

== Recording ==
The album started out in Atlanta, with Brendan O'Brien producing and playing several instruments on the tracks "Love Untold", "Hide n Seekin'" & "Angels Walk". Although those sessions produced good results, Westerberg and O'Brien parted ways. O'Brien was pressed for time, and Westerberg needed more time to write enough songs to fill out a full album. Westerberg regrouped with Lou Giordano.

"Good Day" was partially inspired by the death of Replacements guitarist Bob Stinson in February 1995. It references "Hold My Life", a track from the album Tim (A good day is any day that you're alive/Hold my life one last time).

== Critical reception ==
Eventually received mixed reviews. Allmusic music critic, journalist & biographer Stephen Thomas Erlewine said that Westerberg could not tell the difference between "maturity & stodginess," and that "neither his riffs nor his performance has the energy of vintage Replacements." Associated Press critic Tim Gihring noted that "a sober Paul is a boring Paul," in reference to Westerberg's recently acquired sobriety.

David Yonke of the Toledo Blade was more positive, calling Eventually a "musical delight for mind and body." Fred Shuster of The Vindicator called "Ain't Got Me", "These Are the Days" & "Good Day" 'good songs', and said that Westerberg succeeded without the Replacements. Scott Timberg of Connecticut's The Day called Eventually one of Westerberg's best albums with or without the Replacements.

"Love Untold" was released as a single, peaking on the Billboard Alternative Songs chart at #21 on June 1, 1996.

== Track listing ==
All tracks are written by Paul Westerberg, except where noted.

No.	Title	Length
1.	"These Are the Days"	3:58
2.	"Century"	4:35
3.	"Love Untold"	4:16
4.	"Ain't Got Me"	3:25
5.	"You've Had It with You"	3:11
6.	"MamaDaddyDid"	2:57
7.	"Hide n Seekin'"	3:06
8.	"Once Around the Weekend"	3:56
9.	"Trumpet Clip"	3:17
10.	"Angels Walk"	3:22
11.	"Good Day"	4:19
12.	"Time Flies Tomorrow"	4:33
Total length:		45:55

Japanese edition bonus track
No.	Title	Writer(s)	Length
13.	"Make Your Own Kind of Music"	Barry Mann, Cynthia Weil	3:34

== Personnel ==
- Paul Westerberg – guitar, vocals, organ, bass guitar, piano, saxophone
- Eddie Miller – percussion
- Keith Christopher – bass guitar
- Michael Bland – drums, percussion
- Brendan O'Brien – acoustic guitar, bass guitar, keyboards
- Josh Freese – drums, percussion
- Tommy Stinson – bass guitar & trombone on "Trumpet Clip"
- Davey Faragher – bass guitar
- Michael Urbano – drums, percussion, trombone
