= KCMP =

Adult Album Alternative radio station in Lakeville, Minnesota

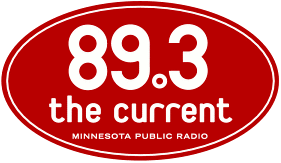
- Northfield, Minnesota; United States
- Broadcast area: Faribault–Northfield-Minneapolis-St.Paul, Minnesota
- Frequency: 89.3 MHz (HD Radio)
- Branding: 89.3 The Current

Programming
- Format: Adult Album Alternative; Public radio
- Subchannels: HD2: Carbon Sound
- Affiliations: MPR; NPR

Ownership
- Owner: Minnesota Public Radio
- Sister stations: KNOW-FM; KSJN

History
- First air date: 1968
- Former call signs: WCAL-FM (1968–2005)
- Call sign meaning: Current Minnesota Public radio

Technical information
- Licensing authority: FCC
- Facility ID: 62162
- Class: C1
- ERP: 100,000 watts
- HAAT: 234 m (768 ft)
- Transmitter coordinates: 44°41′20.9″N 93°4′21.8″W
- Repeaters: KPCC-HD2; Pasadena, California; KMSE; Rochester, Minnesota; KZIO; Duluth, Minnesota

Links
- Public license information: Public file; LMS
- Website: www.thecurrent.org

KCMP (89.3 FM, 89.3 the Current) is a radio station owned by Minnesota Public Radio (MPR) that airs an adult album alternative (AAA) music format, including a significant rotation of songs by local artists. Licensed to serve Northfield, Minnesota, and covering the Minneapolis-St. Paul market, the station's studios are located at the MPR Broadcast Center on Cedar Street in downtown St. Paul, while its transmitter is located atop the Vermillion Highlands near Coates. The Current is also simulcast on stations in Rochester, Duluth-Superior, Pasadena-Los Angeles, and translators around Minnesota.

The Current, which has been broadcasting its AAA format since 2005, debuted after MPR purchased WCAL-FM, the radio station of St. Olaf College in Northfield, in 2004. WCAL-FM went on the air in 1968 as an extension of WCAL, a station that shared time with KUOM at the University of Minnesota Minneapolis. WCAL's origin dated to 1918 with service continuing until 1991.

== Format ==
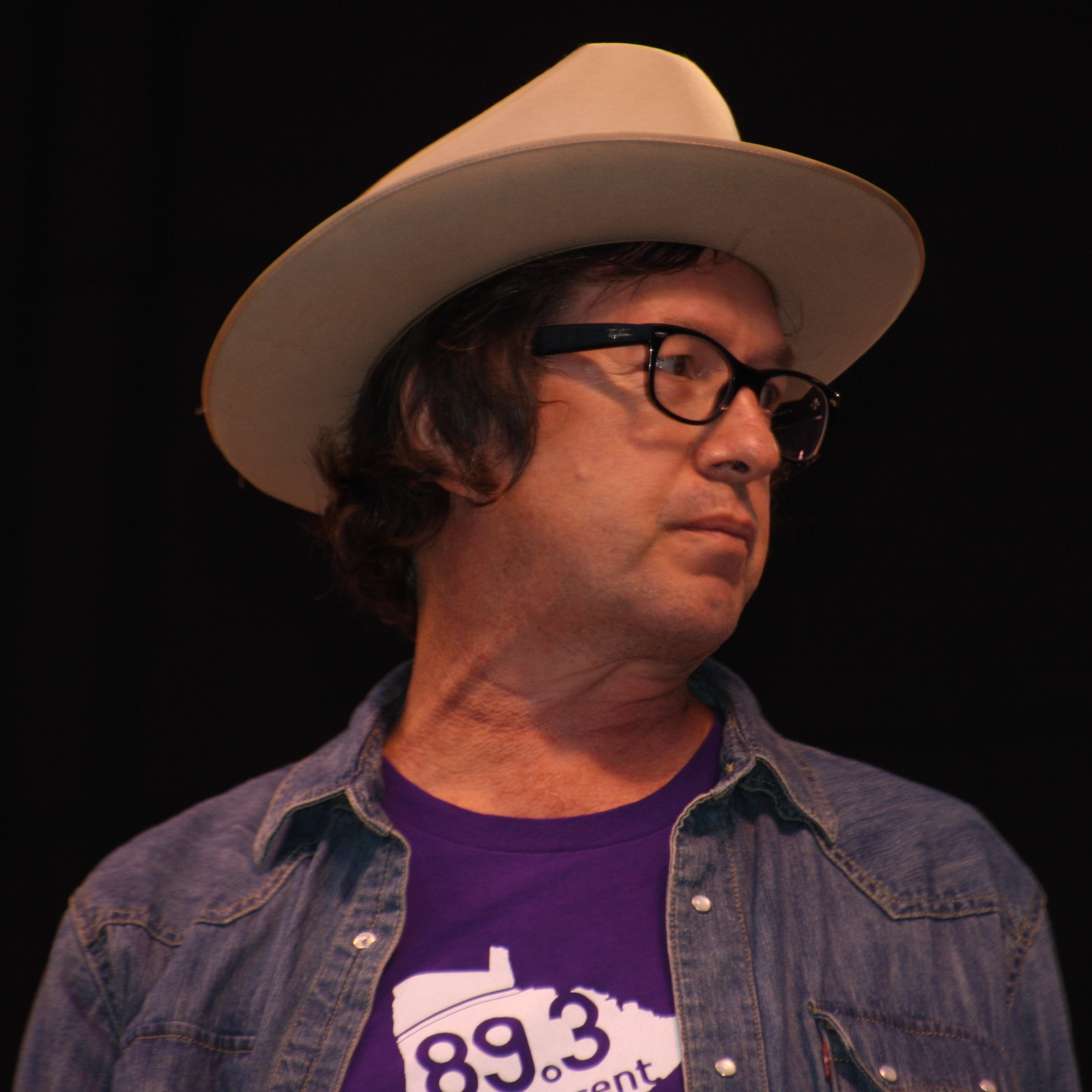
Bill DeVille wearing a shirt for the Current

The modern "third service" for MPR (the organization already operates "news and information" and classical music networks) programs a wide range of music. The KCMP "anti-format" was announced in December 2004, along with the station's new program director Steve Nelson and music director Thorn Skroch. KCMP is modeled on noncommercial alternative stations established earlier, including KEXP (Seattle), KCRW (Los Angeles), and the pioneering WXPN (Philadelphia).

== History ==
=== St. Olaf Era ===
The station which would later become 89.3 FM began with physics experiments in 1918 when five students and a professor built a small radio transmitter at St. Olaf College, which used a wire antenna strung between the campus chapel and the college's "Old Main" (the tallest nearby building). The college was issued a "Technical and Training School" license with the call sign 9YAJ for the experimental operations, which was picked up as far away as New Zealand. On May 6, 1922, the college was granted a broadcasting station license with the call sign WCAL. It would broadcast two programs per week during the school year at 770 kc. in the AM band. One notable achievement by the station in the next few years was the broadcast of William Shakespeare's play As You Like It, apparently the first time a play had been broadcast on radio.

In 1924, a financial crunch meant that the station might be forced to close down. The St. Olaf senior class and local newspaper, The Northfield News, campaigned for donations. Money came in from across Minnesota and several nearby states. This made WCAL the first listener-supported station in the United States. From 1928-circa 1954, WCAL was entirely listener-supported and received no direct financial support from St. Olaf College. In 1949, the station's card file held the names and addresses of over 60,000 donors. The station's AM signal was heard as far as the western United States, Mexico, Florida, Alaska and Canada.

WCAL first experimented with FM broadcasts in 1948. Broadcasts on 89.3 FM were officially launched on October 1, 1967 as a sister to the established AM, which was one of the first radio stations in the state. A few years later in 1971, WCAL became one of 90 founding members of National Public Radio organized by the Corporation for Public Broadcasting. WCAL-FM was operated by St. Olaf for over 37 years and was known as "Classical 89.3" later in its history, playing what many considered to be "alternative" classical music along with a variety of sacred music and religious programming.

Twenty-four-hour broadcasts began in 1984, and a new 100-kilowatt transmitter went on-air in 1991, meaning that the station could be picked up across most of the Twin Cities region (Northfield is on the southern edge of the area). The transmitter was placed on land owned by the University of Minnesota in exchange for WCAL turning over its time-share hours on 770 kHz, which had been shared with KUOM for many years. Because 770 kHz is an FCC-defined clear-channel frequency occupied by full-time station WABC in New York City, it could not be used by other stations at night; as daytime-only stations, WCAL and KUOM each broadcast an average of about six hours per day. The shutdown of WCAL allowed KUOM to broadcast the maximum amount of time allowed by the license.

WCAL's radio format focused on European classical music radio programming and related musical genres. The "Christmas at St. Olaf" program was one of several annual events that were broadcast by the station. Over the years, the station regularly broadcast religious services, and expanded them into a number of different languages. Another first that WCAL takes credit for is the first play-by-play broadcast of a sporting event. The station eventually became affiliated with AMPERS, the independent public radio network in Minnesota.

=== Sale of WCAL ===
On August 11, 2004, St. Olaf College announced that it had decided to sell WCAL to enhance the institution's endowment. At least eleven offers were reportedly received, but apparently only two were presented to the Board of Regents, including one from California-based EMF Broadcasting, a non-commercial religious broadcaster which originates the K-Love network.

St. Olaf announced in August that it had decided to sell WCAL to Minnesota Public Radio. MPR had made a bid for WCAL as early as 1971, shortly after NPR's formation. The station was now even more attractive to MPR, as it was the most powerful noncommercial signal in the state that wasn't a part of the MPR network. This prompted the formation of a group known as SaveWCAL that attempted to halt the sale to MPR. SaveWCAL argued that the station was a charitable trust held by St. Olaf, and the college should have at least asked a judge for permission to dissolve the trust before selling it to MPR. These efforts were unsuccessful.

The sale agreement for WCAL/KMSE was finalized by St. Olaf College and Minnesota Public Radio on Friday, November 19, 2004. The station ceased broadcasting from its Northfield studios at 10 p.m. two days later, and began simulcasting Minnesota Public Radio's classical music stream. The two-day delay allowed for final broadcasts of Sunday religious services. A few WCAL employees were hired by MPR and some changes were made to MPR's classical music service in an attempt to appeal to former WCAL listeners. On February 1, 2005, the WCAL call sign was sold by MPR to the student-run college radio station of California University of Pennsylvania.

Continued activism from SaveWCAL, however, resulted in a state district court judge characterizing the transaction as an illegal sale of a charitable trust by an irresponsible trustee. SaveWCAL has since requested that the Minnesota Attorney General's office declare the sale void and filed a Petition To Redress Breach of Trust in Rice County District Court on September 24, 2008. However, in 2009, another court ruled that SaveWCAL had waited too long to go to court.

=== The Current ===
MPR launched the new format at 9 a.m. on January 24, 2005, changing the call sign in the process. "Say Shh", by the Minneapolis-based hip-hop group Atmosphere, was the first song to air under the KCMP banner. The station had an immediate impact, and after just three months, was voted "Best Radio Station" by readers of the local City Pages alternative weekly newspaper. However, a March 2008 City Pages article criticized the Current for repetitious programming and losing touch with the format that endeared listeners during its first two years.

== HD Radio and Web streaming ==
KCMP is licensed by the FCC to broadcast in the HD Radio format.

The Current operates several other music services, including "Purple Current", which offers music inspired by Prince and music that likely inspired him; The Siren (women's music and content); Local Current, focusing on Minnesota-made music; Radio Heartland (Americana and roots music); and Rock The Cradle, a children's music stream. On June 16, 2022, the Current debuted another streaming service, "Carbon Sound", focusing on black music including hip-hop, R&B, afrobeat, and related genres. The new service streams online and is available on the HD 2 subchannel of KCMP.

== Notable presenters ==
- Mary Lucia
- Steve Seel
- Mark Wheat (January 2005 – June 2, 2020)

== Broadcast reach ==
The Current is heard on 89.3 FM in the Twin Cities metro area, reaching into western Wisconsin. The service is also heard on 88.7 FM KMSE in Rochester and in Duluth on KZIO at 104.3 MHz and 94.1 MHz. In addition, it is carried on an APM-managed station, KPCC in Pasadena, California via an HD Radio subchannel of that station. Additional translators have been periodically added in other cities. The Current's programming originates from St. Paul; the other stations break away during one-minute windows throughout the day for local underwriting and weather, along with legal IDs at the top of each hour. KZIO has a small amount of locally originated content.

Simulcast stations
Call sign	Frequency	City of license	ERP W	Notes
KMSE	88.7 FM	Rochester, Minnesota	850	
KNSR	88.9 FM HD-2	Collegeville, Minnesota	100,000	On HD2 subchannel
KPCC	89.3 FM HD-2	Pasadena, California	600	On HD2 subchannel
KZIO	104.3 FM	Two Harbors, Minnesota	50,000	
KGAC	91.5 FM HD-2	St. Peter, Minnesota	8,500	On HD2 subchannel

Broadcast translators for The Current
Call sign	Frequency	City of license	FID	ERP (W)	FCC info
K228XN	93.5 FM	St. Peter, Minnesota	143176	60	LMS
K237ET	95.3 FM	New Ulm, Minnesota	152814	250	LMS
K280EF	103.9 FM	Austin, Minnesota	42931	9	LMS
K286AW	105.1 FM	Mankato, Minnesota	150348	10	LMS
W248AS	97.5 FM	Hinckley, Minnesota	141828	55	LMS
