= Wild Stab =

Studio album by The I Don't Cares
- Released: January 22, 2016
- Recorded: 2015
- Studio: Paul Westerberg's home studio
- Genre: Rock
- Length: 51:37
- Language: English
- Label: Dry Wood Music

Paul Westerberg chronology
| PW & The Ghost Gloves Cat Wing Joy Boys (2009) | Wild Stab (2016) |

Juliana Hatfield chronology
| Whatever, My Love (2015) | Wild Stab (2015) | Pussycat (2017) |

Singles from Wild Stab
- 1. "1 / 2 2 P" Released: October 31, 2015; 2. "King of America" Released: November 25, 2015

Professional ratings
Review scores
| Source | Rating |
|---|---|
| AllMusic | 4/5 stars |
| Consequence | B− |
| Rolling Stone | 3.5/5 stars |

Wild Stab is the 2016 debut album from American rock music duo the I Don't Cares, made up of alternative rock singer-songwriters Juliana Hatfield and Paul Westerberg. A Perfect Circle's Josh Freese is the uncredited drummer for the band.

== Recording ==
The two got together following the Replacements' “Back By Unpopular Demand” reunion tour in 2015 to work on the album. Wild Stab contains a mix of songs: original material written by the duo, "never-before-heard gems from Westerberg’s basement archive, and re-recorded solo tunes from his back catalog. "Born for Me", originally from Westerberg's Suicaine Gratifaction, is rerecorded as a duet.

Westerberg had a bunch of songs he'd written, and wanted a fresh pair of ears to listen to them. Hatfield, who was an admirer of Westerberg's 'tough guy rock & roll grit', suggested what songs might work together as an album. Wild Stab was recorded in Westerberg's basement and intended to come across as garage rock.

Wild Stab's release was preceded by the Westerberg penned singles "1 / 2 2 P" & "King of America". “Need the Guys” is a tribute to Thin Lizzy frontman Phil Lynott.

== Critical reception ==
It has received positive reviews from critics. Andrew Lee of Easy Street Records called it "simply a great rock and roll collaboration record with something for everyone, and it’s brought to you by a couple of seasoned musicians who still have star power and who really know what they’re doing."

The editorial staff of AllMusic Guide gave the album four out of five stars, with review Stephen Thomas Erlewine praised the musicians' opportunity to have fun with the recording, summing up his review, "All the mess, from its demo-quality fidelity to its throwaways, is intentional and the album is better for it: it's two old pros having a good time, so it's hard not to have a good time too".

Daily Emerald's Craig Wright concurred. "If Wild Stab is the type of material The Replacements would have recorded, it’s for the best that they did not record. Performed in a serious context, much of Wild Stab would be mercilessly trashed by critics.

In an overview of Westerberg's career for Spin in 2016, Drew Fortune calls the collaboration a natural fit and characterizes the album as "just as loose and ramshackle as the band’s name implies".

== Track listing ==
All tracks are written by Paul Westerberg, unless otherwise indicated.

| No. | Title | Writer(s) | Length |
|---|---|---|---|
| 1. | "Back" | | 3:52 |
| 2. | "Wear Me Out Loud" | | 2:41 |
| 3. | "Born for Me" | | 4:08 |
| 4. | "1 / 2 2 P" | | 2:44 |
| 5. | "Sorry for Tomorrow Night" | | 2:41 |
| 6. | "Dance to the Fight" | Hatfield & Westerberg | 2:16 |
| 7. | "Kissing Break" | Hatfield & Westerberg | 3:18 |
| 8. | "Just a Phase" | Hatfield & Westerberg | 3:25 |
| 9. | "Outta My System" | | 3:40 |
| 10. | "Need the Guys" | | 2:27 |
| 11. | "Love Out Loud" | | 2:14 |
| 12. | "King of America" | | 3:29 |
| 13. | "Little People" | | 1:42 |
| 14. | "Whole Lotta Nothin'" | Hatfield & Westerberg | 3:51 |
| 15. | "Done Done Done" | | 2:18 |
| 16. | "Hands Together" | | 6:51 |
| Total length: | | | 51:37 |

== Personnel ==
The I Don't Cares

- Juliana Hatfield – guitar, vocals
- Paul Westerberg – guitar, vocals

Additional personnel

- Josh Freese – drums
