= The I Don't Cares =

American band

- Paul Westerg & Juliana Hatfield

Background information
- Origin: Minneapolis, Minnesota, U.S.
- Genre: Rock
- Works: Wild Stab
- Years active: 2015-2016
- Label: Dry Wood Records
- Past members: Paul Westerberg; Juliana Hatfield; Josh Freese (uncredited)

The I Don't Cares are a collaborative side project from former Replacements frontman Paul Westerberg and former Lemonhead Juliana Hatfield. A Perfect Circle's Josh Freese is the uncredited drummer for the band.

Former J. Geils Band frontman Peter Wolf pointed out to Westerberg in a Vanyaland interview that "I Don't Care is the attitude of great Rock and roll", but wanted to know what exactly the I Don't Cares didn't care about. To which Westerberg explained, "Disconnected, but not disenchanted. You do it, and you don't care what becomes of it. As opposed to I don't care what we're doing."

== Formation ==
Westerberg and Hatfield were old friends. The two got together following the Replacements' “Back By Unpopular Demand” reunion tour in 2015 to work on the album Wild Stab. The collaboration between what Hatfield called "siblings in another life", was recorded in Westerberg's basement and intended to come across as garage rock. Daily Emerald's Craig Wright considered this to be the best light for their collaboration. "If Wild Stab is the type of material The Replacements would have recorded, it’s for the best that they did not record. Performed in a serious context, much of Wild Stab would be mercilessly trashed by critics.

In an overview of Westerberg's career for Spin in 2016, Drew Fortune calls the collaboration a natural fit and characterizes the album as "just as loose and ramshackle as the band’s name implies".

== Wild Stab ==
Wild Stab contains a mix of songs: original material written by the duo, "never-before-heard gems from Westerberg’s basement archive, and re-recorded solo tunes from his back catalog ("Born for Me", originally from Westerberg's Suicaine Gratifaction, is rerecorded as a duet). Westerberg had a bunch of songs he'd written, and wanted a fresh pair of ears to listen to them. Hatfield, who was an admirer of Westerberg's 'tough guy rock & roll grit', suggested what songs might work together as an album. Wild Stab's release was preceded by the Westerberg penned single "1 / 2 2 P".

It received positive reviews from critics. The editorial staff of AllMusic Guide gave the album four out of five stars, with critic Stephen Thomas Erlewine praising the musicians' opportunity to have fun with the recording, summing up his review, "All the mess, from its demo-quality fidelity to its throwaways, is intentional and the album is better for it: it's two old pros having a good time, so it's hard not to have a good time too".

Andrew Lee of Easy Street Records called it "simply a great rock and roll collaboration record with something for everyone, and it’s brought to you by a couple of seasoned musicians who still have star power and who really know what they’re doing."
