= 14 Songs =

Studio album by Paul Westerberg
- Released: June 15, 1993
- Studios: Coast Recorders (San Francisco, California); The Sound Factory, Hollywood, California; Record One (Sherman Oaks, California); Can-Am Recorders (Tarzana, California); RPM Studios (New York City, New York); Paisley Park (Chanhassen, Minnesota)
- Genre: Rock
- Length: 47:57
- Label: Sire/Reprise
- Producers: Paul Westerberg; Matt Wallace

Paul Westerberg chronology
14 Songs (1993)	Eventually (1996)

Singles from 14 Songs
- 1. "World Class Fad" Released: 1993; 2. "Runaway Wind" Released: 1993

14 Songs is the first solo album by the American musician Paul Westerberg, released in 1993. It followed the final Replacements album, All Shook Down, and the dissolution of the band.

The album features contributions from Ian McLagan, former keyboardist for the Faces, a band that Westerberg has often cited as a favorite.

In an interview included with a special edition of the album, he explained that he started the record jamming with drummer Josh Kelly and former Georgia Satellites bassist Rick Price, but found that the combination wasn't working, requiring him to seek other players. (The only song featuring Kelly and Price is the opener, "Knockin' On Mine.") He also revealed that the album title was a reference to Nine Stories, by J.D. Salinger.

The CD version was packaged in book form, with the disc in a pocket inside the front cover. All numbered pages in the book are page 14, including six pages at the back for "Notes."

== Reception ==
Professional ratings
Review scores
Source	Rating
AllMusic	4/5 stars
Entertainment Weekly	B
The Indianapolis Star	4/4 stars
Los Angeles Times	4/4 stars
NME	7/10
Q	4/5 stars
The Rolling Stone Album Guide	4/5 stars
Select	4/5
The Village Voice	B+

Stereo Review wrote that "Westerberg writes about everyday things without pretense, taking comfort in the ordinary and passing on wisdom in small doses... Perhaps consequently, if anything rings a little hollow here it's rockers like 'Silver Naked Ladies' and 'Something Is Me', which aim for a rambunctious 'Mats/Faces devil-may-care feeling but sound a mite forced." The Indianapolis Star opined that "while it's lamentable that Westerberg continues to put distance between him and that true Mats sound, it's good to have rock's sublime poet/jester back."

Tim Murphy of the Ridgefield Press gave the album a B-, citing that it was not as good as Replacements drummer Chris Mars' solo album, Horseshoes and Hand Grenades, and that it didn't seem as if Westerberg enjoyed making the album. Associated Press writer Richard Ruelas found just the opposite, saying that 14 Songs reflects new optimism from the artist who once made songs title "Unsatisfied", "Within Your Reach" & "If Only You Were Lonely".

By March 1996, 14 Songs had sold over 161,000 copies in the United States.

== Track listing ==
All tracks are written by Paul Westerberg.

No.	Title	Length
1.	"Knockin' on Mine"	3:43
2.	"First Glimmer"	4:55
3.	"World Class Fad"	3:27
4.	"Runaway Wind"	4:23
5.	"Dice Behind Your Shades"	4:11
6.	"Even Here We Are"	1:39
7.	"Silver Naked Ladies"	4:38
8.	"A Few Minutes of Silence"	3:17
9.	"Someone I Once Knew"	3:06
10.	"Black Eyed Susan"	3:33
11.	"Things"	3:21
12.	"Something Is Me"	2:18
13.	"Mannequin Shop"	3:11
14.	"Down Love"	2:15
Total length:		47:57

== Personnel ==
Musicians

- Paul Westerberg – vocals, guitars, keyboards (2, 8), bass (3, 5, 12), saxophone (7, 13), tenor saxophone (9), handclaps (13), whistle (13), backing vocals (1–3, 5, 7–9, 12–14)
- Joan Jett – backing vocals (9)
- Charmony Brothers – backing vocals (11)
- Suzanne Dyer – backing vocals (12)
- Josh Freese – drums (3)
- Josh Kelly – drums (1), backing vocals (1)
- Laurie Lindeen – backing vocals (5)
- Brian MacLeod – drums (4, 5, 7–9, 11, 13, 14), handclaps (13), whistle (13), backing vocals (7, 14)
- Ian McLagan – acoustic piano (2, 7), backing vocals (7)
- John Pierce – bass (2, 4, 5, 7–9, 11, 13, 14), strings (5), shaker (7), acoustic piano (9), handclaps (13), whistle (13), backing vocals (7, 14)
- Rick Price – mandolin (1), bass (1), backing vocals (1)
- Susan Rogers – backing vocals (12)
- Michael Urbano – drums (2)
- Jim "Watts" Vereecke – backing vocals (14)
- Matt Wallace – percussion (2, 5, 8), bass (6), drums (9, 12), backing vocals (1–3, 5, 8, 9, 12, 14)

Production

- Paul Westerberg – producer, concept, design, mixing (1, 4–14)
- Matt Wallace – producer, engineer, mixing (1, 2, 4–14)
- David Bryson – mixing (2)
- Brendan O'Brien – mixing (3)
- Susan Rogers – additional engineer
- Suzanne Dyer – assistant mix engineer
- Steve Holroyd – assistant mix engineer
- John Jackson – assistant mix engineer
- Dave Kent – assistant mix engineer
- Mike Krowiak – assistant mix engineer
- John Paterno – assistant mix engineer
- Mike Pre – assistant mix engineer
- Jim "Watts" Vereecke – assistant mix engineer
- Doug Sax – mastering at The Mastering Lab (Hollywood, California)
- Kim Champagne – concept, design, booklet photography (pages 2, 6 & 11)
- Frank W. Ockenfels III – cover photography
