= WCAL (Minnesota) =

Non-commercial AM radio station in Northfield, Minnesota (1922–1991)

WCAL was a non-commercial AM radio station licensed to Northfield, Minnesota, that was operated from its establishment in 1922 until its deletion in 1991 by St. Olaf College.

== History ==
Following World War I, radio experimentation at St. Olaf began with physics experiments in 1918, when five students and a professor built a small transmitter, using a wire antenna strung between the campus chapel and the college's "Old Main" (the tallest nearby building). In 1921, the college was issued a "Technical and Training School" license with the call sign 9YAJ for the experimental operations, which began to include audio broadcasts in addition to the original Morse code transmissions.

Initially there were no specific standards in the United States for radio stations making transmissions intended for the general public, and numerous stations under various classifications made entertainment broadcasts. However, effective December 1, 1921, the Department of Commerce, the regulators of radio at this time, adopted a regulation that formally created a broadcasting station category, and stations were now required to hold a Limited Commercial license authorizing operation on wavelengths of 360 meters (833 kHz) for "entertainment" broadcasts or 485 meters (619 kHz) for "market and weather reports". On May 6, 1922, the college was granted a broadcasting station license with the call sign WCAL, for operation on the 360 meter "entertainment" wavelength. This call sign was randomly assigned from a sequential roster of available call letters. (Initially call letters beginning with "W" were generally assigned to stations east of an irregular line formed by the western state borders from North Dakota south to Texas, with calls beginning with "K" going only to stations in states west of that line. In January 1923, the Mississippi River was established as the new boundary, thus after this date Minnesota stations west of the river generally received call letters starting with "K" instead of "W".)

On November 11, 1928, a major reassignment of station transmitting frequencies took place, under the provisions of the Federal Radio Commission's General Order 40. WCAL was assigned to 1250 kHz, and a shortage of available assignments meant it had to share this frequency with three other stations: University of Minnesota's WLB, Carleton College's KFMX, and the Rosedale Hospital's WRHM, which in 1934 changed its call sign to WTCN (now WWTC). WCAL, WLB, and KFMX were operated by educational institutions, while WTCN was a commercial station which aggressively sought to expand its operating hours at the expense of the other three stations. KFMX surrendered its license in 1933, and in 1938 WLB and WCAL made peace with WTCN by agreeing to move to 760 kHz, where the stations were restricted to daytime-only transmissions, with WCAL to receive 1/3rd of the available hours.

In March 1941, stations on 760 kHz, including WCAL and WLB, moved to 770 kHz, with the implementation of the North American Regional Broadcasting Agreement. In 1968, St. Olaf College began broadcasting on the FM band as WCAL-FM 89.3.

In 1945, WLB changed its call sign to KUOM. St. Olaf eventually made an agreement with the University of Minnesota in which WCAL was provided land for an improved FM tower near Rosemount, Minnesota, in exchange for KUOM's exclusive use of the AM frequency. Therefore, WCAL was deleted on December 16, 1991. The move to the Rosemount tower gave WCAL-FM full coverage of the Twin Cities for the first time ever. The college continued to operate WCAL-FM 89.3 until selling it to Minnesota Public Radio in 2004, resulting in changing the call letters to KCMP.

== See also ==
- List of initial AM-band station grants in the United States
