= Folker (album) =

Studio album by Paul Westerberg
- Released: September 7, 2004
- Studio: Westerberg's basement studio
- Genre: Alternative rock
- Length: 52:05
- Label: Vagrant
- Producer: Paul Westerberg

Paul Westerberg chronology
Come Feel Me Tremble (2003)	Folker (2004)	Besterberg: The Best of Paul Westerberg (2005)

Professional ratings
Review scores
Source	Rating
AllMusic	3/5 stars
PopMatters	(no rating)
Rolling Stone	(favorable)

Folker is Paul Westerberg's sixth solo album. It peaked at number 178 on the Billboard 200 and number 18 on the Top Independent Album charts.

It basically means I like folk music, I’m comfortable with the genre. I still love Rock and roll, though. That’ll always be a part of me.

Folker marks the final chapter in a trilogy of albums for the previous leader of the Replacements, which started back in 2002 with the release of the double album Stereo/Mono. Much like that set, Folker was entirely written, produced and recorded by Westerberg in his basement studio, with the recording kept as simple and lo-fi as possible. Westerberg has stated in interviews that he wanted to create a folk album in the vein of Rod Stewart's earliest solo work, consisting of an acoustic bass with minimal instrumentation layered on top of the tracks.

Westerberg shopped "Jingle" around to major retailers like Target and Best Buy for use in advertising, but both passed. "My Dad" & "Lookin' Up in Heaven" are about his father, who died from emphysema in November 2003.

All versions of Folker contain the Sandy Denny song "Who Knows Where the Time Goes?", which follows "Folk Star" in track 13. The song is credited in the liner notes. The European release of Folker has a second hidden song on track 13, "Be Bad For Me," which plays after approximately three minutes of silence. There is a hype sticker on the case which announces this bonus track.

== Track listing ==
All tracks are written by Paul Westerberg.

No.	Title	Length
1.	"Jingle"	1:28
2.	"Now I Wonder"	4:35
3.	"My Dad"	3:28
4.	"Lookin' Up in Heaven"	3:12
5.	"Anyway's All Right"	4:41
6.	"$100 Groom"	5:15
7.	"23 Years Ago"	5:35
8.	"As Far as I Know"	3:03
9.	"What About Mine?"	3:43
10.	"How Can You Like Him?"	4:04
11.	"Breathe Some New Life"	5:30
12.	"Gun Shy"	3:14
13.	"Folk Star"	4:17
Total length:		52:05
