= Come Feel Me Tremble =

Studio album by Paul Westerberg
- Released: October 21, 2003
- Genre: Alternative rock
- Label: Vagrant
- Producer: Paul Westerberg

Paul Westerberg chronology
Stereo (2002)	Come Feel Me Tremble (2003)	Folker (2004)

Come Feel Me Tremble is Paul Westerberg's fifth solo album. Like its predecessor, it is a rough collection of songs that Westerberg recorded by himself in his home.

== Recording ==
Come Feel Me Tremble is a rough collection of songs that Westerberg recorded by himself in his home. The song "Crackle & Drag", which was recorded in both its louder original take and quieter alternate version, is about the poet Sylvia Plath. It takes its title from the last line of her poem "Edge." Westerberg was struck by the calm and considered preparations Plath took before committing suicide. "What a Day (For a Night)" was written for Bonnie Raitt, who didn't want it, while "Pine Box" is about Westerberg's father's experience of World War II and its lasting impact.

== Critical reception ==
Professional ratings
Aggregate scores
Source	Rating
Metacritic	78/100
Review scores
Source	Rating
AllMusic	3/5 stars
Pitchfork	6.7/10
PopMatters	(no rating)
The New Rolling Stone Album Guide	3/5 stars

Come Feel Me Tremble received generally positive reviews from critics.

== Track listing ==
The track listing on the album is incorrect. "Hillbilly Junk" is listed as being the third song when, in reality, it is the ninth. All songs were written by Paul Westerberg unless noted otherwise.

1. "Dirty Diesel" – 3:13
2. "Making Me Go" – 2:54
3. "Soldier of Misfortune" – 3:05
4. "My Daydream" – 3:17
5. "What a Day (For a Night)" – 3:13
6. "Wild & Lethal" – 5:20
7. "Crackle & Drag (Original Take)" – 3:49
8. "Crackle & Drag (Alternate Version)" – 2:35
9. "Hillbilly Junk" – 2:50
10. "Never Felt Like This Before" – 1:02
11. "Knockin' Em Back" – 4:00
12. "Pine Box" – 6:01
13. "Meet Me Down the Alley" – 5:05
14. "These Days" (Jackson Browne) – 4:06
