= Nowhere Man (song) =

1965 song by the Beatles

- US picture sleeve

Single by the Beatles
- B-side: "What Goes On"
- Released: 3 December 1965 (UK Rubber Soul album); 21 February 1966 (US single)
- Recorded: 21–22 October 1965
- Studio: EMI, London
- Genre: Folk rock
- Length: 2:44
- Label: Capitol
- Songwriter: Lennon–McCartney
- Producer: George Martin

The Beatles US singles chronology
"We Can Work It Out" / "Day Tripper" (1965)	"Nowhere Man" (1966)	"Paperback Writer" (1966)

"Nowhere Man" is a song by the English rock band the Beatles. It was released in December 1965 on their album Rubber Soul, except in the United States and Canada, where it was first issued as a single A-side in February 1966 before appearing on the album Yesterday and Today. The song was written by John Lennon and credited to the Lennon–McCartney partnership. In the US, the single peaked at number 3 on the Billboard Hot 100 and number 1 on the chart compiled by Record World magazine, as it did the RPM 100 chart in Canada and in Australia. The song was also released as a single in some countries where it had been included on Rubber Soul, including Australia, where it topped the singles chart.

Recorded on 21 and 22 October 1965, "Nowhere Man" describes a man with no direction in his life and with no genuine worldview. It is one of the first Beatles songs to be entirely unrelated to romance or love, and marks a notable example of Lennon's philosophically oriented songwriting. Lennon, Paul McCartney and George Harrison sing the song in three-part harmony. The lead guitar solo was performed in unison by Harrison and Lennon. The pair played identical "sonic blue"-coloured Fender Stratocasters on the track. The song appears in the film Yellow Submarine, where the Beatles sing it about the character Jeremy Hillary Boob after meeting him in the "nowhere land". The song was also played throughout the Beatles' 1966 US tour and their 1966 tour of Germany, Japan and the Philippines.

== Background ==
Towards the end of the production for Rubber Soul, John Lennon had difficulties in coming up with a new song. He spent over five hours trying to come up with another song, and eventually decided to "lay down". During his idling, Lennon suddenly thought of himself as being a "Nowhere Man—sitting in his nowhere land". The song is generally credited as being among the first Beatles' songs not pertaining to themes of romance or love. Lennon reflected in a 1980 Playboy interview that:

I'd spent five hours that morning trying to write a song that was meaningful and good, and I finally gave up and lay down. Then 'Nowhere Man' came, words and music, the whole damn thing as I lay down.

McCartney said of the song:

That was John after a night out, with dawn coming up. I think at that point, he was a bit...wondering where he was going.

Reviewing the US single release, Record World called it a "meaningful song about what happens to a fellow afraid to be himself."

== Analysis ==
"Nowhere Man" sample

The song as a whole is a 32-bar form, following the standard model of the Tin Pan Alley chorus, with a repeating 8-bar primary statement outlining the E-major chord, a third phrase (bars 17–24) forming a musical question (concluding on the dominant B), and a fourth phrase recapitulating the initial statement in E major. The primary statement begins with the chord of E (I tonic) on "He's a real" and then involves a 5–4–3–2–1 pitch descent between the B (V dominant) chord on "nowhere man" and A (IV subdominant) chord on "sitting in"; a twist comes where Am (iv minor) replaces A in the final line ("nowhere plans") and the simultaneous G♯ note melody creates a dissonant Am^{M7}. The bridge (a standard third-phrase "B" in the AABA form), which appears three times, seesaws on a G♯ minor/A major (iii–IV) sequence before falling back on an F♯ minor and leading back to the verse on a B^{7}, as is typical of "Tin-pan alley" standard B sections.

== Other recordings ==
A ukulele version of "Nowhere Man" by Tiny Tim was Harrison's contribution to the Beatles' 1968 Christmas record. Distributed to members of the Beatles' fan club, the record differed from the band's previous Christmas records by including separate contributions from the four bandmates, reflecting the disharmony within the group at the time. Beatles historian John Winn describes Tim's version as the "highlight of the disc" and a "timeless" interpretation.

The song has attracted many other performers. There is a recording in the synth-pop style by Gershon Kingsley, a glam metal recording by Dokken and an easy-listening recording by Yanni. In his book on the legacy of Rubber Soul, John Kruth expresses disappointment in the Carpenters' version, which was recorded in 1968 and released in 2001, following singer Karen Carpenter's death (she died in 1983), with a "ludicrous" overdubbed string arrangement. He highlights a "down-home take" by Randy Travis for the 1995 Come Together Beatles tribute album for its "sweet cascading pedal steel riff". The Paul Westerberg's acoustic rendering in the soundtrack 2001 film I Am Sam transforming the song into a "regretful lullaby". He also recognises former Ramones drummer Marky Ramone as the singer who made a "balls-to-the-wall version", pointing out that in Ramone's 1999 version, Ramone "spits and sprays Lennon's lyrics while guitars slash and grind".

== Personnel ==
According to Ian MacDonald:

- John Lennon – double-tracked vocal, acoustic rhythm guitar, lead guitar
- Paul McCartney – harmony vocal, bass guitar
- George Harrison – harmony vocal, lead guitar
- Ringo Starr – drums

== Charts and certifications ==
=== Weekly charts ===
Chart (1965–66)	Peak position
Australia (Kent Music Report)	1
Austria (Ö3 Austria Top 40)	8
Belgium (Ultratop 50 Wallonia)	12
Canada Top Singles (RPM)	1
Finland (Suomen virallinen lista)	36
Rhodesia (Lyons Maid)	4
US Billboard Hot 100	3
US Cash Box Top 100	2
US Record World 100 Top Pops	1
West German Musikmarkt Hit-Parade	3

=== Certifications ===
Region	Certification	Certified units/sales
United States (RIAA)	Gold	1,000,000^{^}
^{^} Shipments figures based on certification alone.

== Sources ==
- Babiuk, Andy (2002). Beatles Gear: All the Fab Four's Instruments, from Stage to Studio. San Francisco, CA: Backbeat Books. ISBN 978-0-87930-731-8.
- Clayson, Alan (2003). George Harrison. London: Sanctuary. ISBN 1-86074-489-3.
- Everett, Walter (2001). The Beatles as Musicians: The Quarry Men through Rubber Soul. New York, NY: Oxford University Press. ISBN 0-19-514105-9.
- Gilliland, John (1969). "The Rubberization of Soul: The great pop music renaissance". Pop Chronicles. Digital.library.unt.edu.
- Kruth, John (2015). This Bird Has Flown: The Enduring Beauty of Rubber Soul, Fifty Years On. Milwaukee, WI: Backbeat Books. ISBN 978-1-61713-573-6.
- MacDonald, Ian (2005). Revolution in the Head: The Beatles' Records and the Sixties (Second Revised ed.). London: Pimlico (Rand). ISBN 1-84413-828-3.
- Spizer, Bruce (2003). The Beatles on Apple Records. New Orleans, LA: 498 Productions. ISBN 0-9662649-4-0.
- Turner, Steve. A Hard Day's Write: The Stories Behind Every Beatles' Song, Harper, New York: 1994, ISBN 0-06-095065-X
- Unterberger, Richie (2009). "Rubber Soul [UK]". Allmusic.
- Winn, John C. (2008). Way Beyond Compare: The Beatles' Recorded Legacy, Volume One, 1962–1965. New York, NY: Three Rivers Press. ISBN 978-0-3074-5239-9.
- Winn, John C. (2009). That Magic Feeling: The Beatles' Recorded Legacy, Volume Two, 1966–1970. New York, NY: Three Rivers Press. ISBN 978-0-307-45239-9.
