= Stereo (Paul Westerberg album) =

Studio album by Paul Westerberg
- Released: April 23, 2002
- Genre: Folk rock
- Length: 1:19:37
- Label: Vagrant
- Producer: Paul Westerberg

Paul Westerberg chronology
Suicaine Gratifaction (1999)	Stereo (2002)	Come Feel Me Tremble (2003)

Professional ratings
Aggregate scores
Source	Rating
Metacritic	76/100
Review scores
Source	Rating
AllMusic	4/5 stars
Alternative Press	6/10
Blender	3/5 stars
Entertainment Weekly	A−
The Guardian	3/5 stars
Pitchfork	7.7/10
Q	3/5 stars
Rolling Stone	3.5/5 stars
The Rolling Stone Album Guide	4/5 stars
Uncut	4/5 stars

Stereo is the fourth solo album by former Replacements leader Paul Westerberg, released April 23, 2002. Stereo was packaged with Mono, which he credited to his Grandpaboy alter ego. The hidden track that closes Stereo, "Postcards from Paradise", is a cover of a Flesh for Lulu song.

Capitol Records dropped Westerberg following the poor performance of Suicaine Gratifaction. Rather than trying to latch on with another major label, Westerberg recorded Stereo/Mono in his basement with very little outside help, and released it on the independent Vagrant Records label.

Vagrant Records also had a limited release of Mono as a separate album. On November 29, 2019, Stereo/Mono was released as a double LP as part of Record Store Day's Black Friday.

== Critical reception ==
As detailed in the liner notes, Westerberg made no effort to fix imperfections, and even included a song for which the tape ran out before it was over. Westerberg's young son makes an unscheduled appearance on "We May Be the Ones".

All this worked to Westerberg's advantage. Mark Deming of AllMusic states, "If you loved the side of Paul Westerberg that came up with stuff like "Within Your Reach," "If Only You Were Lonely," or "Here Comes a Regular," the good news is he's found a way to tap back into that mindset and he's captured it on tape." A Knight Ridder review asserts that "The former voice of an uncertain generation sounds surer of himself than at any other juncture in his solo career.

== Track listing ==
All tracks are written by Paul Westerberg, except where noted.

Disc 1: Grandpa Boy Mono
No.	Title	Length
1.	"High Time"	3:01
2.	"I'll Do Anything"	3:13
3.	"Let's Not Belong"	3:51
4.	"Silent Film Stars"	3:28
5.	"Knock It Right Out"	2:25
6.	"2 Days 'Til Tomorrow"	3:27
7.	"Eyes Like Sparks"	2:32
8.	"Footsteps"	3:25
9.	"Kickin' the Stall"	2:57
10.	"Between Love & Like"	3:21
11.	"AAA"	3:10

Disc 2: Paul Westerberg Stereo
No.	Title	Writer(s)	Length
12.	"Baby Learns to Crawl"		2:48
13.	"Dirt to Mud"		2:42
14.	"Only Lie Worth Telling"		4:47
15.	"Got You Down"		3:11
16.	"No Place for You"		3:55
17.	"Boring Enormous"		3:17
18.	"Nothing to No One"		2:13
19.	"We May Be the Ones"		4:15
20.	"Don't Want Never"		3:26
21.	"Strike Down the Band"		0:43
22.	"Mr. Rabbit"	Traditional	2:27
23.	"Let the Bad Times Roll"		3:45
24.	"Call That Gone? / Postcards from Paradise"	"Postcards from Paradise" written by Rocco Barker, Nick Marsh, Kevin Mills & James Mitchell	7:16
Total length:			79:37

Note: Track listing on Stereo is numbered differently as it omits "Strike Down the Band" and the hidden track, "Postcards from Paradise". It lists only 12 songs. "Postcards from Paradise" is located on the same track as "Call That Gone?", following a short period of silence.

== Personnel ==
- Grandpaboy – guitar & vocals
- Elrod Puce – backing vocals, maracas, handclaps
- Zeke Pine – bass
- Henry Twiddle – drums

with:

- Luther Covington – superfluous lead guitar
