= I Am Sam (soundtrack) =

Soundtrack album (Beatles tribute album) by Various Artists
- Released: January 8, 2002
- Recorded: November 2001
- Genre: Rock
- Length: 55:03
- Label: V2 Records
- Producer: Mitch Rotter, Rob Schnapf

Professional ratings
Review scores
Source	Rating
AllMusic	link
Pitchfork	3.7/10 link

I Am Sam is the soundtrack to the 2001 film I Am Sam. It was released on January 8, 2002, by V2 Records (see 2002 in music). The album contents are made up entirely of cover versions of songs by the Beatles, although it was originally intended to consist of the group's original recordings. When producers were unable to obtain the rights to the original tracks, they commissioned the artists featured on the album to record the versions released.

== Track listing ==
All tracks are written by Lennon–McCartney.

No.	Title	Artist(s)	Length
1.	"Two of Us"	Aimee Mann and Michael Penn	3:30
2.	"Blackbird"	Sarah McLachlan	2:21
3.	"Across the Universe"	Rufus Wainwright	4:08
4.	"I'm Looking Through You"	The Wallflowers	2:39
5.	"You've Got to Hide Your Love Away"	Eddie Vedder	2:09
6.	"Strawberry Fields Forever"	Ben Harper	4:26
7.	"Mother Nature's Son"	Sheryl Crow	2:42
8.	"Golden Slumbers"	Ben Folds	1:41
9.	"I'm Only Sleeping"	The Vines	3:05
10.	"Don't Let Me Down"	Stereophonics	4:08
11.	"Lucy in the Sky with Diamonds"	The Black Crowes	3:50
12.	"Julia"	Chocolate Genius	4:34
13.	"We Can Work It Out"	Heather Nova	2:15
14.	"Help!"	Howie Day	3:33
15.	"Nowhere Man"	Paul Westerberg	3:29
16.	"Revolution"	Grandaddy	3:02
17.	"Let It Be"	Nick Cave	3:30

European bonus tracks
No.	Title	Writer(s)	Artist(s)	Length
18.	"Lucy in the Sky with Diamonds"	Lennon–McCartney	Aimee Mann	3:41
19.	"Two of Us"	Lennon–McCartney	Neil Finn and Liam Finn	3:16
20.	"Here Comes the Sun"	George Harrison	Nick Cave	3:00

Korean bonus tracks
No.	Title	Writer(s)	Artist(s)	Length
18.	"Lucy in the Sky with Diamonds"	Lennon–McCartney	Aimee Mann	3:41
19.	"Two of Us"	Lennon–McCartney	Neil Finn and Liam Finn	3:16

Japanese bonus tracks
No.	Title	Writer(s)	Artist(s)	Length
18.	"Lucy in the Sky with Diamonds"	Lennon–McCartney	Aimee Mann	3:41
19.	"Two of Us"	Lennon–McCartney	Neil Finn and Liam Finn	3:16
20.	"If I Needed Someone"	George Harrison	Tica	2:52

== Charts ==
=== Weekly charts ===
Chart (2002)	Peak position
Australian Albums (ARIA)	8
Canadian Albums (Billboard)	9
French Albums (SNEP)	82
German Albums (Offizielle Top 100)	99
New Zealand Albums (RMNZ)	39
US Billboard 200	20
US Soundtrack Albums (Billboard)	2

=== Year-end charts ===
Year-end chart performance for I Am Sam
Chart (2002)	Position
Australian Albums (ARIA)	48
Canadian Albums (Nielsen SoundScan)	48
Canadian Alternative Albums (Nielsen SoundScan)	12
US Billboard 200	101
US Soundtrack Albums (Billboard)	5

=== Certifications ===
Region	Certification	Certified units/sales
Australia (ARIA)	Gold	35,000^{^}
Canada (Music Canada)	Platinum	100,000^{^}
United States (RIAA)	Gold	500,000^{^}
^{^} Shipments figures based on certification alone.

== See also ==
- All This and World War II
- This Bird Has Flown – A 40th Anniversary Tribute to the Beatles' Rubber Soul
- Sgt. Pepper Knew My Father
- Sgt. Pepper's Lonely Hearts Club Band (soundtrack)
