= List of Kerrang! Award winners =

This article lists the presenters, venues and winners for the Kerrang! Awards from 1999 to 2016 and for 2018 and 2019. The 2017 event did not take place, with the awards returning the following year.

As the awards later ceased after the 2022 event, this list can be seen as complete. The Heavy Music Awards can be seen as a spiritual successor to the awards, due to many former voters deflecting to these awards during Kerrang!'s final years. In addition, Kerrang Radio in 2025 broadcast the Heavy winners in lieu of a ceremony.

However, as the Kerrang! Awards are officially a separate and defunct entity, a list of Heavy Awards winners past and present can be found on their own page.

== 2022 ==
Date: 23 June 2022

Venue: Shoreditch Town Hall

- Kerrang! Icon: Green Day
- Best Live Act: Twenty One Pilots
- New Noise Award: WARGASM
- Best International Breakthrough: Amyl And The Sniffers
- The Disruptor Award: Mimi Barks
- Kerrang! Hall Of Fame: Weezer
- Best Album: Bob Vylan – Bob Vylan Presents The Price Of Life
- Grassroots Award: Janey Starling
- Best British Breakthrough: Nova Twins
- Best Festival: Download Pilot
- Best British Act: Biffy Clyro
- Best International Act: Poppy
- Best Song: Bring Me the Horizon – "Die4U"
- Kerrang! Inspiration Award: Fall Out Boy

== 2021 ==
Did not take place due to COVID-19 Omicron concerns.

== 2020 ==
Did not take place due to COVID-19.

== 2019 ==
Date: 19 June 2019

Venue: Islington Assembly Hall

- Best Breakthrough Act: Idles
- Best International Breakthrough Act: SWMRS
- Best Song: FEVER 333 – "Burn It"
- Best Album: Ghost – Prequelle
- Best British Live Act: Architects
- Best International Live Act: Metallica
- Best British Act: Bring Me the Horizon
- The Kerrang! Hall Of Fame: Skunk Anansie
- The Kerrang! Inspiration Award: Motörhead
- Best International Act: Metallica
- The Kerrang! Icon Award: Jimmy Page

== 2018 ==
Date: 24 June 2018

Venue: Islington Assembly Hall

Host: Sam Coare (Kerrang! editor) and Phil Alexander

- Best British Breakthrough: Dream State
- Best International Breakthrough: Code Orange
- Best Song: Neck Deep - "In Bloom"
- Best Album: Enter Shikari - The Spark
- Best British Live Act: Architects
- Best International Live Act: Foo Fighters
- Best British Band: Biffy Clyro
- Best International Band: Foo Fighters
- Kerrang! Legend: Corey Taylor
- Kerrang! Inspiration: Joe Perry
- Kerrang! Icon: Tony Iommi

== 2017 ==
Did not take place due to transition sale period from Bauer to Mixmag Media.

== 2016 ==
Date: 9 June 2016

- Lifetime Achievement Award: Deftones
- Kerrang! Legend: Iron Maiden
- Kerrang! Hero: Thin Lizzy
- The Icon Award: Blink-182
- Spirit Of Punk: Frank Carter
- Best Event: You Me At Six – The Ghost Inside Benefit Show
- Best British Band: Asking Alexandria
- Best British Newcomer: Creeper
- Best International Newcomer: Cane Hill
- Best Track: All Time Low – "Missing You"
- Best Live Band: Babymetal
- Best Album: No Devotion – Permanence
- Best International Band: A Day To Remember
- Best Fanbase: Twenty One Pilots
- Best Film: Deadpool
- Best TV Show: Making a Murderer
- Best Radio Show: Nights with Alice Cooper – Planet Rock
- Best Video Game: Rise of the Tomb Raider
- Best Comicbook: The Wicked + The Divine
- Best Festival: Bloodstock
- Best Comedian: Amy Schumer
- Tweeter of the Year: Hayley Williams

== 2015 ==
Date: 11 June 2015

- Best Event: All Time Low/You Me At Six – All Time Low/You Me At Six co-headline tour
- Best British Newcomer: Royal Blood
- Best International Newcomer: PVRIS
- Kerrang! Inspiration: Judas Priest
- Kerrang! Icon: Alice Cooper
- Best Single: Enter Shikari – "Anaesthetist"
- Best Video: New Years Day – "Angel Eyes" feat. Chris Motionless
- Best Live Band: Black Veil Brides
- The Relentless Award: Rolo Tomassi
- Best Album: Marmozets – The Weird And Wonderful Marmozets
- Best International Band: All Time Low
- Best British Band: Bring Me the Horizon
- The Lifetime Achievement Award: Marilyn Manson
- The Spirit of Independence Award: Babymetal
- The Spirit of Punk Award: Slaves
- Best Fanbase: Pierce The Veil
- Best TV Show: Adventure Time
- Best Video Game: The Walking Dead
- Best Film: Guardians of the Galaxy
- Best Comic Book: The Walking Dead
- Best Comedian: Russell Howard
- Tweeter of the Year: Hayley Williams

== 2014 ==
Date: 12 June 2014
Venue: The Troxy
Host: Andrew W.K and Scott Ian

- Best Event: Fall Out Boy – Save Rock and Roll Tour
- Best British Newcomer: Neck Deep
- Best International Newcomer: 5 Seconds of Summer
- Kerrang! Inspiration: The Dillinger Escape Plan
- Kerrang! Icon: Ramones
- Best Single: You Me at Six – "Fresh Start Fever"
- Best Video: Deaf Havana – "Boston Square"
- Best Live Band: Bring Me the Horizon
- Relentless Award: Watain
- Kerrang! Service to Rock: Status Quo
- Best Album: Architects – Lost Forever // Lost Together
- Best International Band: Fall Out Boy
- Best British Band: You Me at Six
- Kerrang! Hall of Fame: Deep Purple
- Kerrang! Hero: Gerard Way
- Best TV Show: Game of Thrones
- Best Video Game: The Last of Us
- Best Film: The Lego Movie
- Best Comedian: Jarrod Alonge
- Tweeter of the Year: Gerard Way
- Hottest Female: Taylor Momsen, The Pretty Reckless
- Hottest Male: Andy Biersack, Black Veil Brides
- Best Festival: Slam Dunk

== 2013 ==
Date: 13 June 2013
Venue: The Troxy
Host: Scott Ian and Mark Hoppus

- Best Event: You Me at Six – The Final Night of Sin
- Best British Newcomer: Lower Than Atlantis
- Best International Newcomer: Of Mice & Men
- Relentless Award: Young Guns
- Best Video: Pierce the Veil (featuring Kellin Quinn) – "King for a Day"
- Best Single: Fall Out Boy – "The Phoenix"
- Best Album: Biffy Clyro – Opposites
- Best Live Band: Black Veil Brides
- Kerrang! Inspiration: Iron Maiden
- Kerrang! Icon: Venom
- Best International Band: All Time Low
- Best British Band: Bring Me the Horizon
- Kerrang! Hall of Fame: Pantera
- Kerrang! Service to Rock: Queen
- Kerrang! Legend: Slayer
- Best TV Show: Doctor Who
- Best Video Game: BioShock Infinite
- Best Film: The Hobbit: An Unexpected Journey
- Best Comedian: Louis C.K.
- Tweeter of the Year: Gerard Way
- Hottest Female: Lzzy Hale, Halestorm
- Hottest Male: Ben Bruce, Asking Alexandria
- Best Festival: Download Festival

== 2012 ==
Date: 7 June 2012
Venue: The Brewery
Host: Scott Ian and Corey Taylor

- Best British Newcomer: While She Sleeps
- Kerrang! Service to Rock: Tenacious D
- Best Single: Black Veil Brides – "Rebel Love Song"
- Best Album: Mastodon – The Hunter
- Devotion Award: The Blackout
- Kerrang! Service to Metal: Download Festival
- Best Video: Bring Me the Horizon – "Alligator Blood"
- Best Live Band: Enter Shikari
- Best International Band: My Chemical Romance
- Best British Band: You Me at Six
- Kerrang! Hall of Fame: Machine Head
- Kerrang! Icon: Slash
- Kerrang! Inspiration: Black Sabbath
- Best International Newcomer: Falling in Reverse
- Best TV Show: Game of Thrones
- Best Video Game: The Elder Scrolls V: Skyrim
- Best Film: The Hunger Games
- Best Comedian: Russell Howard
- Tweeter of the Year: Hayley Williams, Paramore
- Hottest Female: Lzzy Hale, Halestorm
- Hottest Male: Ben Bruce, Asking Alexandria
- Villain of the Year: Justin Bieber
- Hero of the Year: Rou Reynolds, Enter Shikari
- Best Festival: Download Festival

== 2011 ==
Date: 9 June 2011
Venue: The Brewery
Host: Scott Ian and Corey Taylor

- Best British Newcomer: Asking Alexandria
- Best International Newcomer: Black Veil Brides
- Devotion Award: Skindred
- Best Single: "Hurricane" – Thirty Seconds to Mars
- Best Video: "Na Na Na (Na Na Na Na Na Na Na Na Na)" – My Chemical Romance
- Classic Songwriter: Biffy Clyro
- Best Album: There Is a Hell Believe Me I've Seen It. There Is a Heaven Let's Keep It a Secret. – Bring Me the Horizon
- Best Live: All Time Low
- Best British Band: You Me at Six
- Best International Band: Thirty Seconds to Mars
- Kerrang! Legend: Ozzy Osbourne
- Kerrang! Hall of Fame: Korn
- Kerrang! Inspiration: Def Leppard
- Kerrang! Icon: Alice Cooper

== 2010 ==
Date: 29 July 2010
Venue: The Brewery
Host: Scott Ian and Corey Taylor

- Best British Newcomer: Rise to Remain
- Best International Newcomer: Trash Talk
- Best Single: "Liquid Confidence" – You Me at Six
- Best Video: "The Captain" – Biffy Clyro
- Best Album: Brand New Eyes – Paramore
- Best Live Band: Bullet for My Valentine
- Best International Band: Thirty Seconds to Mars
- Best British Band: Bullet for My Valentine
- No Half Measures: Frank Turner
- Classic Songwriter: Lostprophets
- Kerrang! Inspiration: Rammstein
- Kerrang! Services to Metal: Paul Gray
- Kerrang! Icon: Ronnie James Dio
- Kerrang! Hall of Fame: Mötley Crüe

== 2009 ==
Date: 3 August 2009
Venue: The Brewery
Host: Scott Ian and Corey Taylor

- Best British Newcomer: In Case of Fire
- Best International Newcomer: The Gaslight Anthem
- Best Single: "Omen" – The Prodigy
- Best Video: "Oblivion" – Mastodon
- Classic Songwriter: Linkin Park
- Spirit of Independence: The Wildhearts
- Kerrang! Icon: Alice in Chains
- Best Album: Death Magnetic – Metallica
- Best Live Band: Slipknot
- Inspiration: Machine Head
- Hall of Fame: Limp Bizkit
- Best British Band: Bullet for My Valentine
- Best International Band: Slipknot

== 2008 ==
Date: 21 August 2008
Venue: The Brewery
Host: Scott Ian

- Best International Newcomer: Black Tide
- Best British Newcomer: Lesser Than People
- Kerrang! Icon: Slipknot
- Best Video: "Feathers" – Coheed and Cambria
- Best Single: "From Yesterday" – Thirty Seconds to Mars
- Best Album: Avenged Sevenfold – Avenged Sevenfold
- Best Live Band: Machine Head
- Classic Songwriter: Def Leppard
- Spirit of Independence: The Dillinger Escape Plan
- Best British Band: Bullet for My Valentine
- Best International Band: Thirty Seconds to Mars
- Inspiration: Metallica
- Hall of Fame: Rage Against the Machine

== 2007 ==
Date: 23 August 2007
Venue: The Brewery
Host: Scott Ian

- Best British Newcomer: Gallows
- Best International Newcomer: Madina Lake
- Best Live Band: Enter Shikari
- Best Single: "The Kill" – Thirty Seconds to Mars
- Best Album: The Blackening – Machine Head
- Best Video: "This Ain't a Scene, It's an Arms Race" – Fall Out Boy
- Best British Band: Lostprophets
- Best International Band: My Chemical Romance
- Classic Songwriter: Deftones
- Spirit of Independence: Enter Shikari
- Hard Rock Hero: Machine Head
- Kerrang! Icon: Nine Inch Nails
- Hall of Fame: Judas Priest

== 2006 ==
Date: 24 August 2006
Venue: The Brewery
Host: Stuart Cable

- Best Band on the Planet: My Chemical Romance
- Best British Band: Lostprophets
- Best Live Band: Muse
- Best Album: Liberation Transmission – Lostprophets
- Best Single: "Tears Don't Fall" – Bullet for My Valentine
- Best Video: "Sugar, We're Goin Down" – Fall Out Boy
- Best British Newcomer: Bring Me the Horizon
- Best International Newcomer: Aiden
- Classic Songwriter: Placebo
- Spirit of Independence: The Prodigy
- Kerrang! Hall of Fame: Slayer
- Kerrang! Legend: Angus Young (AC/DC)

== 2005 ==
Date: 25 August 2005
Venue: The Brewery
Host: Juliette Lewis and Stuart Cable

- Best Band on the Planet: Green Day
- Best British Newcomer: Bullet for My Valentine
- Best International Newcomer: Trivium
- Classic Songwriter: Trent Reznor (Nine Inch Nails)
- Best Video: "Helena" – My Chemical Romance
- Lifetime Achievement: Killing Joke
- Best British Band: Funeral for a Friend
- Best Single: "Best of You" – Foo Fighters
- Best Album: Three Cheers for Sweet Revenge – My Chemical Romance
- Best Live Band: Green Day
- Services to Metal: Roadrunner Records
- Icon Award: Marilyn Manson
- Hall of Fame: Iron Maiden

== 2004 ==
Date: 26 August 2004
Venue: The Brewery
Host: Stuart Cable

- Best British Newcomer: Yourcodenameis:Milo
- Best International Newcomer: Velvet Revolver
- Best Single: "Last Train Home" – Lostprophets
- Best Album: Absolution – Muse
- Icon Award: MC5
- Best Video: "Funeral of Hearts" – HIM
- Best Live Band: The Darkness
- Spirit of Rock: Anthrax
- Classic Songwriters: Ash
- Best British Band: The Darkness
- Best Band on the Planet: Metallica
- Hall of Fame: Green Day

== 2003 ==
Date: 21 August 2003

- Best Single: "Lifestyles of the Rich & Famous" – Good Charlotte
- Best Video: "Gay Bar" – Electric Six
- Event of The Year: Download Festival
- Classic Songwriters: Red Hot Chili Peppers
- Spirit of Independence: Turbonegro
- Best Live Act: The Darkness
- Spirit of Rock: Jackass
- Best International Newcomer: Evanescence
- Best British Newcomer: Funeral for a Friend
- Best Album: Permission to Land – The Darkness
- Best British Band: Feeder
- Best International Act: Linkin Park
- Hall of Fame: Metallica

== 2002 ==
Date: 27 August 2002

- Best International Newcomer: Sum 41
- Best Single: "Blurry" – Puddle of Mudd
- Classic Songwriters: The Offspring
- Best British Live Act: Muse
- Best Video: "Tainted Love" – Marilyn Manson
- Best British Band: A
- Best International Live Act: Rammstein
- Best British Newcomer: The Cooper Temple Clause
- Best Album: Ideas Above Our Station – Hundred Reasons
- Best Band in the World: Red Hot Chili Peppers
- Spirit of Independence: Alec Empire
- Hall of Fame: Foo Fighters

== 2001 ==
Date: 28 August 2001

Venue: Royal Lancaster Hotel

- Best British Live Act: Feeder
- Best International Live Act: Papa Roach
- Best British Newcomer: Lostprophets
- Spirit of Independence: Less Than Jake
- Best British Band: Muse
- Best Single: "Heaven Is a Halfpipe" – OPM
- Best International Newcomer: Linkin Park
- Best Video: "Last Resort" – Papa Roach
- Classic Songwriters: Green Day
- Best Album: Holy Wood (In the Shadow of the Valley of Death) – Marilyn Manson
- Best Band in the World: Slipknot
- Hall of Fame: Iggy Pop

== 2000 ==
- Date: August 2000
- Venue: Hammersmith Palais
- Best International Newcomer: Queens of the Stone Age
- Best British Newcomer: Hundred Reasons
- Kerrang! Creativity Award: Ross Robinson
- Spirit of Independence: Napalm Death
- Best Video: "All the Small Things" – Blink 182
- Best Single: "Wait and Bleed" – Slipknot
- Best Album: White Pony – Deftones
- Best British Live Band: One Minute Silence
- Best International Live Act: Slipknot
- Classic Songwriters: Foo Fighters
- Best British Band: Stereophonics
- Best Band in the World: Slipknot
- Hall of Fame: Marilyn Manson
- Silver K Award: Motörhead

== 1999 ==
Date: August 1999

- Best British Newcomer: Cay
- Best British Live Act: 3 Colours Red
- Best International Live Act: System of a Down
- Best International Newcomer: Buckcherry
- Best Single: "Tequilla" – Terrorvision
- Best Album: Performance and Cocktails – Stereophonics
- Best Video: "Pretty Fly (For a White Guy)" – The Offspring
- Spirit of Independence: The Hellacopters
- Artist of the Millennium: Black Sabbath
- Best British Band: Stereophonics
- Classic Songwriter: Dave Mustaine (Megadeth)
- Best Band in the World: Marilyn Manson
- Hall of Fame: Jimmy Page (Led Zeppelin)

== 1998 ==
Date: August 25, 1998

- Best New British Band: Stereophonics
- Best British Live Act: Cradle of Filth
- Best International Live Act: Green Day
- Best International Newcomer: Soulfly
- Best Single: "The Impression That I Get" – The Mighty Mighty Bosstones
- Best Album: Around the Fur – Deftones
- Best Video: "Genius" – Pitchshifter
- Spirit of Independence: Tura Satana
- Best British Band: Bush
- Classic Songwriter: Lemmy (Motörhead)
- Best Band in the World: Marilyn Manson
- Hall of Fame: AC/DC

== 1997 ==
Date: September, 1997.

- Best New British Band: Placebo
- Best International Newcomer: Coal Chamber
- Best Video: "Breathe" - The Prodigy
- Classic Songwriter: Jon Bon Jovi
- Kerrang! Creativity: Def Leppard
- Best Single: "Place Your Hands" - Reef
- Spirit of Independence: Entombed
- Best Album: Life Is Peachy - Korn
- Hall of Fame: Black Sabbath
- Best British Live Act: Skunk Anansie
- Best British Band: Skunk Anansie
- Best International Live Act: Marilyn Manson (band)
- Best in the World: Marilyn Manson (band)

== 1996 ==
Date: 1996.

- Best New British Band: Ash
- Best International Newcomer: The Presidents of the United States of America
- Best International Live Act: Bush
- Best Single: "No Fronts: The Remixes" by Dog Eat Dog
- Best Video: "Roots Bloody Roots" by Sepultura
- Best Album: Foo Fighters by Foo Fighters
- Monsters of Rock Award: Kiss
- Heaviest Band in the World... Ever: Slayer
- Kerrang! Hall of Fame: Queen
- Classic Songwriter: Alice in Chains
- Kerrang! Creativity Award: Butch Vig from Garbage
- Best British Live Act: Skunk Anansie
- Best British Band: Terrorvision
- Best Band in the World: Bon Jovi

== 1995 ==
Date: 20 June 1995

Venue: Cumberland Hotel
Host: Phil Alexander

- Best New British Band: Skunk Anansie
- Best Alternative Album: "The Holy Bible" by Manic Street Preachers
- Best New International Act: Machine Head
- Best Promo Video: "Davidian" by Machine Head
- Best International Live Act: Bon Jovi
- Best British Band: Terrorvision
- Best British Live Act: Thunder
- Best Album: "Unplugged in New York" by Nirvana
- Best Single: "Naked" by Reef
- Greatest All-Time Guitar Riff: Tony Iommi for "Paranoid"
- Hall of Fame (previously Kudos Award): Bon Jovi
- Kreativity Award: Steve Harris
- Klassic Songwriter: Bryan Adams
- Monsters of Rock: Tony Wilson, producer of Radio 1's Rock Show.

== 1994 ==
Date: 13 June 1994.

Venue: Notre Dame Hall

- Best New British Band: Terrorvision
- Best New International Act: Pantera
- Best International Live Act: Bon Jovi
- Best Promo Video: "Ember's Fire" by Paradise Lost
- Best Alternative Metal Album: Troublegum by Therapy?
- Best Album: Chaos A.D. by Sepultura
- Best British Live Act: The Almighty
- Best British Band: Def Leppard
- Best Band in the World: Bon Jovi
- Kudos Award: Ozzy Osbourne
- Kreativity Award Aerosmith
- Monsters of Rock: Peter Grant
