= Campfire (Rend Collective album) =

Studio album by Rend Collective
- Released: 29 January 2013
- Genre: CCM; Worship; folk; indie rock; roots rock
- Length: 47:28
- Label: Integrity

Rend Collective chronology
Homemade Worship by Handmade People (2012)	Campfire (2013)	The Art of Celebration (2014)

Campfire is the third album by the folk-rock worship band Rend Collective. The album was released on January 29, 2013, by Integrity Music and Columbia Records.

== Background ==
This is the third album from the Northern Irish group that was released on January 29, 2014, by Integrity Music and Columbia Records. It is composed of re-recorded songs from their previous two albums, Organic Family Hymnal (2012) and Homemade Worship by Handmade People (2011). This album was recorded outside by a campfire in Ireland using all acoustic instruments.

== Critical reception ==
A reviewer at Jesus Freak Hideout had a couple of complaints: first was that the opening song, "Kumbaya", was only recorded with one person singing, while he felt it would have been better with multiple people. They continued further to say that they were worried that the recordings would have a hollow sound to them but they did not. They finish by saying "another top-notch release from the Irish worshipers and a successful first foray into live recordings."

Stephanie Ford, a reviewer for the Houghton Star had positive words for the album. She was impressed that the album was recorded around an actual campfire in Ireland saying "Rend Collective pushed artistic boundaries through their acoustic live recording." She reports that some of the songs have a very upbeat Irish foot stomping feel, while others still retain the Irish feel but slow down to a meditative tempo. She mentioned that the lyrics add a layer of depth to the David Crowder like energy creating what she calls "a heart-felt cry to God"

Jonathan Andre of Indie Vision Music also had positive things to say, placing the album in his top three favorites of the year. He mentions the great acoustic sound, light percussion and a chorus of voices, he states that it "is one of the best acoustic albums ever produced". He calls it "one of the most ingenious album covers of 2013".

== Track listing ==
No.	Title	Length
1.	"Kumbaya"	0:33
2.	"Come On My Soul"	3:16
3.	"Desert Soul"	4:22
4.	"Build Your Kingdom Here"	4:23
5.	"Movements"	4:37
6.	"You Are My Vision"	3:47
7.	"You Bled"	5:28
8.	"The Cost"	4:06
9.	"Alabaster"	3:14
10.	"Second Chance"	5:05
11.	"10,000 Reasons"	5:00
12.	"Praise Like Fireworks"	3:37
Total length:		47:28

== Charts ==
Chart performance for Campfire
Chart (2015)	Peak position
UK Christian & Gospel Albums (OCC)	4
