= Humble as the Sun =

Studio album by Bob Vylan
- Released: 5 April 2024
- Studios: The Pool, Hush Hush, The Bedroom, The Church, Ashu's Place, Windy Ridge (London); Marshall (Milton Keynes); Laurie's Room (Tunbridge Wells)
- Length: 34:42
- Label: Ghost Theatre
- Producers: Bobby Vylan; Rex Roulette; Laurie Vincent

Bob Vylan chronology
Bob Vylan Presents the Price of Life (2022)	Humble as the Sun (2024)

Singles from Humble as the Sun
- 1. "Dream Big" Released: 21 July 2023; 2. "He's a Man" Released: 27 October 2023; 3. "Hunger Games" Released: 5 January 2024; 4. "Makes Me Violent" Released: 1 March 2024

Humble as the Sun is the third studio album by London-based duo Bob Vylan, released on 5 April 2024 through Ghost Theatre. It received acclaim from critics.

== Critical reception ==
Professional ratings
Aggregate scores
Source	Rating
AnyDecentMusic?	8.1/10
Metacritic	82/100
Review scores
Source	Rating
Clash	8/10
Classic Rock	4/5 stars
DIY	4.5/5 stars
God Is in the TV	9/10
Kerrang!	4/5 stars
musicOMH	4.5/5 stars
NME	4/5 stars
The Skinny	4/5 stars
Tom Hull	A−
Uncut	3.5/5 stars

Humble as the Sun received a score of 82 out of 100 on review aggregator Metacritic based on eight critics' reviews, indicating "universal acclaim". Classic Rock stated that "Bob Vylan have become the loudest, most vital voice of righteous rage in a beaten-down nation", while Uncut felt that "The charisma, charm, galvanising dynamism and radical positivity of frontman Bobbie, works better on stage than in the studio; even so, his hilarious takedowns of Marx-quoting armchair revolutionaries and Brexit-voting Top Gear fans reveal a sharp, self-aware wit behind the headbanging polemic."

DIY's Lisa Wright felt that the album "largely ups the pace, from the electronic, Prodigy-nodding beats of 'Reign' to the prowling punk of 'Dream Big'", writing that the "purposeful shift in perspective nonetheless tweaks the message from aggression to defiance". Jazz Hodge of Clash called the duo "an inspiration to anyone fortunate enough to listen to their music" as they have "a confidence to say what needs to be said". opining that the album "couldn't have come at a more important time".

MusicOMH's John Murphy called it "a huge step up" as "every track on this album grabs the listener and demands attention" with "simmering anger bubbling throughout [...] which makes it one of the most compelling releases of the year". Aliya Chaudhry of NME found that the album "broadens the duo's musical scope" and its "variety keeps things interesting, but it also allows the duo to flex their musical muscles" as "they've traded in some of their previous blistering punk for a more relaxed pace on certain tracks, but without sacrificing any intensity".

=== Year-end lists ===
Select year-end rankings for Humble as the Sun
Publication/critic	Accolade	Rank	Ref.
BBC Radio 6 Music	26 Albums of the Year 2024	-	
Rough Trade UK	Albums of the Year 2024	88	

== Track listing ==
Humble as the Sun track listing
No.	Title	Length
1.	"Humble as the Sun"	4:10
2.	"Reign"	4:46
3.	"GYAG (Get Yourself a Gun)"	3:20
4.	"Dream Big"	3:05
5.	"Hunger Games"	3:40
6.	"Right Here"	2:49
7.	"Makes Me Violent"	3:19
8.	"He's a Man"	2:38
9.	"Ring the Alarm"	3:11
10.	"I'm Still Here"	3:44
Total length:		34:42

== Personnel ==
Musicians

- Bobby Vylan – lead vocals (all tracks); guitar, bass (tracks 1, 3–7, 9); live drums (3, 5), background vocals (7); additional guitars, programming (8); organ (9)
- Jonny Breakwell – organ (track 1), programming (2), additional vocals (3), piano (7, 9), background vocals (7)
- Mikey Sorbello – live drums (tracks 1, 10)
- Hannah Koppenburg – piano, Rhodes (track 1)
- Jerub – additional vocals (track 1)
- Andy Gangadeen – live drums (tracks 2, 6)
- Kelechi Okafor – additional vocals (track 2)
- Luke Pickering – programming (track 3)
- Adam Betts – live drums (tracks 4, 7, 10)
- Vylan Kids Choir – additional vocals (track 4)
- Tim Bazell – live drums, additional guitars (track 5)
- Rex Roulette – additional guitars (tracks 5, 7); guitar, bass (10)
- Henri Davies – programming (track 5)
- Jorge "Saucy" Felizardo – background vocals (track 7)
- Laurie Vincent – guitar, bass (track 8)

Technical

- Bobby Vylan – production (tracks 1–7, 9), recording (all tracks)
- Laurie Vincent – production, recording (track 8)
- Rex Roulette – production, recording (track 10)
- Jonny Breakwell – mixing (all tracks), co-production (tracks 1–9), recording (1, 2, 4, 6–10)
- Kevin Tuffy – mastering
- Luke Pickering – recording (track 3)
- Tim Bazell – recording (track 5)
- Henri Davies – additional production (track 5)
- Adam Beer – recording assistance (tracks 2, 4, 6–9)

Visuals

- Bobby Vylan – art direction
- KJ Price – cover photo

== Charts ==
Chart performance for Humble as the Sun
Chart (2024)	Peak position
Scottish Albums (Official Charts)	11
UK Albums (Official Charts)	22
UK Independent Albums (Official Charts)	3
UK R&B Albums (Official Charts)	1
