= Good News (Rend Collective album) =

Studio album by Rend Collective
- Released: 19 January 2018
- Genre: Worship
- Length: 58:57
- Label: Capitol

Rend Collective chronology
Campfire II: Simplicity (2016)	Good News (2018)	Sparkle. Pop. Rampage. (2019)

Professional ratings
Review scores
Source	Rating
Jesus Freak Hideout	4.5/5 stars

Good News is the eighth studio album by Northern Irish worship band Rend Collective, released on 19 January 2018. The album includes the singles "Rescuer (Good News)" and "Counting Every Blessing".

== Background ==
This is the eighth album from the group that was released on January 19, 2018, by Rend Family Records and Sparrow Records.

On the track "Marching On", Australia's Hillsong Young & Free are featured.

== Critical reception ==
A review from AllMusic says that the album was made "with the aim of promoting a positive and joyful message in times of trouble and negativity" and was "Rich with ebullient full-throated vocals, fiddles, banjo, and plenty of hearty strumming".

== Track listing ==
No.	Title	Length
1.	"Life Is Beautiful"	3:43
2.	"I Will Be Undignified"	3:18
3.	"Rescuer (Good News)"	3:29
4.	"Counting Every Blessing"	5:03
5.	"Nailed to the Cross"	4:06
6.	"Hymn of the Ages"	4:56
7.	"True North"	3:02
8.	"Resurrection Day"	3:43
9.	"No Outsiders"	4:35
10.	"Weep With Me"	4:51
11.	"Weep With Me (Reprise)"	1:06
12.	"Marching On (featuring Hillsong Young & Free)"	3:39
13.	"Yahweh"	5:22
14.	"Counting Every Blessing (Ukelele Session)"	3:56
15.	"Christ Lives In Me"	4:08
Total length:		58:57

== Charts ==
Chart (2015)	Peak position
Australia ARIA Charts	97
Canadian Albums Chart	51
UK Official Charts Company	85
UK Official Christian & Gospel Albums Chart	1
US Billboard 200	70
US Christian Albums	1

== Awards and nominations ==
In 2018, Good News was nominated for a Dove Award for Worship Album of the Year.
