= Rend Collective =

Northern Irish Christian folk rock band

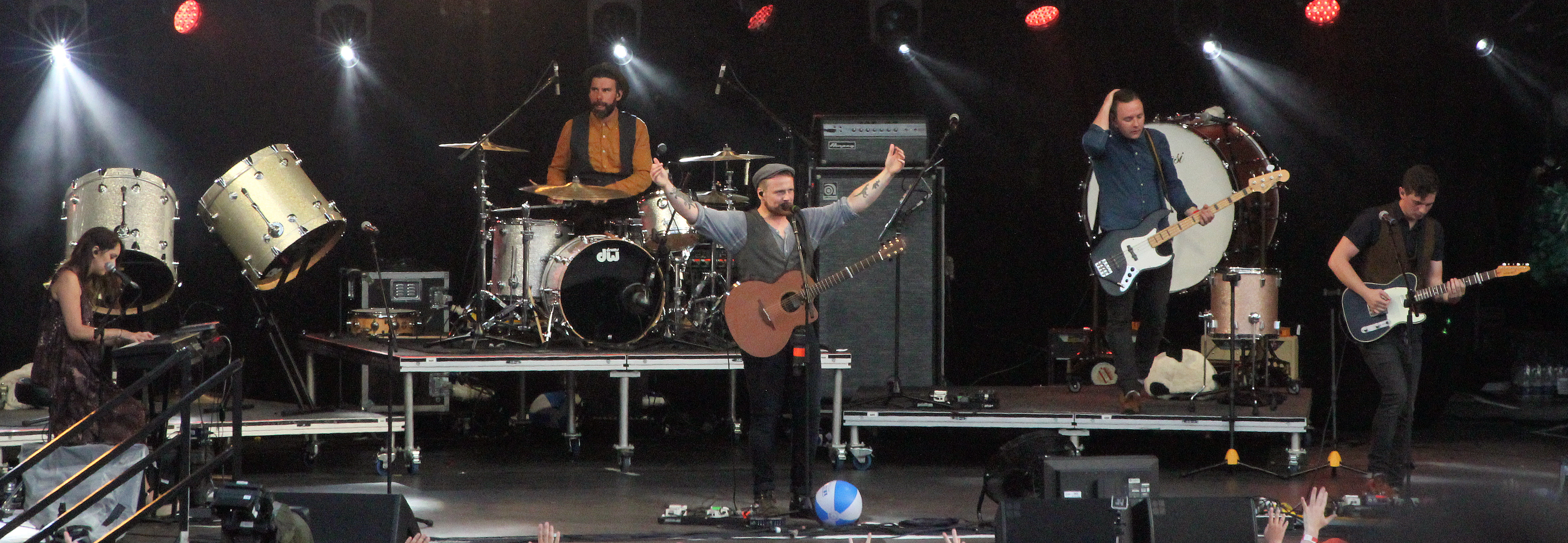
- Rend Collective performing in May 2017

Background information
- Origin: Bangor, Northern Ireland
- Genres: Contemporary Christian, Christian rock, folk rock, worship
- Years active: 2007–present
- Labels: Kingsway, Integrity, Capitol CMG
- Members: Chris Llewellyn; Stephen Mitchell; Wil Pearce; Jonathan Chu; Daniel Jones
- Past members: Bridget Herron; Gareth Gilkeson; Ali Gilkeson; Patrick Thompson; Will Herron; Larry Lease; Thomas Ewing
- Website: rendcollective.com

Rend Collective (formerly known as Rend Collective Experiment) is a Northern Irish Christian folk rock worship band originating from Bangor, Northern Ireland. The current lineup consists of Chris Llewellyn, Steve Mitchell, Wil Pearce, Jonathan Chu and Daniel Jones.

== History ==
The band was established under the name of Rend Collective Experiment between 2002-2003 during a point which drummer Gareth Gilkeson described as "a bunch of us trying to figure out life. Before the formation, most of the members were part of the "Rend" young adults ministry at Bangor Elim Church to where Gilkeson preached and Llewellyn led worship." While the group comprises over 15 members, the band tours and records with 6 members. The remaining members are there for support and to encourage the band "spiritually, musically, and missionally." They explained noticing a sense of hostility from the modern culture towards the church and Christians therefore sought to create music that would draw such individuals spiritually and encourage them to come back to church.

The band's first studio album Organic Family Hymnal was released on 28 September 2010. Their second studio album Homemade Worship by Handmade People was released on 10 January 2012. Both records were released by Kingsway. Their first live album Campfire was released on 29 January 2013 with Integrity. Campfire included live, outdoor recordings of songs previously released on Organic Family Hymnal and Homemade Worship by Handmade People. The audience for the recording were crowd-sourced using Facebook and Twitter.

Rend Collective was on the And If Our God Is for Us... Tour with Chris Tomlin and Christy Nockels in the spring of 2011. They toured with Kari Jobe on the Majestic Tour.

In 2014, Rend Collective toured with the RESET Movement, as part of their musical ministry involving Lacey Sturm (formerly of Flyleaf); spoken-word artist Propaganda; worship leader Dave Lubben; DJ Efechto; International House of Prayer worship artist Matt Gilman; and singer/songwriter Morgan Harper Nichols.

Their third studio album, The Art of Celebration, was released on 17 March 2014. Their fourth studio album, Campfire Christmas (Vol. 1), released 19 November 2014. Their fifth studio album, As Family We Go, was released on 21 August 2015. Their second live album, Campfire II: Simplicity, was released on 7 October 2016. Their sixth studio album, Good News was released on 19 January 2018. Their seventh studio album, Choose to Worship, was released during the COVID-19 pandemic on 27 March 2020. Their eighth studio album, Whosoever, was released 26 August 2022.

Gareth and Ali Gilkeson eventually left the band. Following Llewellyn's release of a solo album, Honest, in September 2023, the band released a new album entitled FOLK! in November 2024. The album was co-written by Llewellyn and fellow band member Stephen Mitchell. As of 2024, the band's line-up consisted of Llewellyn, Mitchell, Will Pearce, Jonathan Chu and Daniel Jones.

== Rend Family Records ==
Their first signee to the label is Urban Rescue, from Los Angeles, California.

== Members ==
Current

- Chris Llewellyn – lead vocals, acoustic guitar, ukulele (2007–present)
- Steve Mitchell – bass guitar, banjo, piano, mandolin, guitar, backing vocals (2013–present)
- Wil Pearce – electric guitar, mandolin, banjo, backing vocals (2021–present)
- Jonathan Chu – fiddle (2020–present)
- Daniel Jones – drums (2024–present)

Former

- Will Herron – lead vocals, acoustic guitar, multi-instrumentalist (2022–2023)
- Bridget Herron – female lead and backing vocals (2023)
- Patrick Thompson – electric guitar, banjo, various strings, backing vocals (2007–2020), bass guitar (2007–2013)
- Bobby Russell – bass guitar, piano (2012–2013)
- Gareth Gilkeson – drums, percussion, band leader (2007–2023)
- Ali Gilkeson – keyboards, female lead/backing vocals, auxiliary percussion, accordion (2007–2023)
- Thomas Ewing – electric guitar, mandolin, harmonica, backing vocals, violin (2021–2023); left for Tenth Avenue North

== Discography ==
=== Albums ===
Year	Album	Peak chart positions							Sales
Year	Album	UK	UK C&G	AUS	CAN	US	US Christ.	US Heat.	Sales
2010	Organic Family Hymnal (as Rend Collective Experiment): Release date: 28 September 2010; Label: Kingsway; Format: CD, digital download	—	—	—	—	—	47	—	US: 428,000
2012	Homemade Worship by Handmade People (as Rend Collective Experiment): Release date: 10 January 2012; Label: Kingsway; Format: CD, digital download	—	6	—	—	—	23	14	
2013	Campfire: Release date: 28 January 2013; Label: Independent; Format: CD, digital download	—	1	—	—	97	7	—	
2014	The Art of Celebration: Release date: 17 March 2014; Label: Integrity; Format: CD, digital download	28	1	—	—	13	1	—	US: 75,000
2014	Campfire Christmas, Vol. 1: Release date: 17 November 2014; Label: Rend Family Records/Capitol/Sparrow; Format: CD, LP, digital download	—	1	—	—	61	4	—	
2015	As Family We Go: Release date: 21 August 2015; Label: Rend Family Records/Capitol/Sparrow; Format: CD, LP, digital download	19	1	—	21	33	1	—	
2016	Campfire II: Simplicity: Release date: 7 October 2016; Label: Rend Family Records/Sparrow; Format: CD, digital download	—	1	—	—	99	3	—	
2018	Good News: Release date: 19 January 2018; Label: Rend Family Records/Sparrow; Format: CD, LP, digital download	85	1	97	51	70	1	—	
2019	Sparkle. Pop. Rampage. (as Rend Co. Kids): Release date: 30 August 2019; Label: Rend Family Records; Formats: CD, digital download	—	3	—	—	—	—	—	
2020	Choose to Worship: Release date: 27 March 2020; Label: Rend Family Records/Capitol CMG; Format: CD, LP, digital download	—	1	—	—	— (Note: Choose to Worship did not enter the Billboard 200, but peaked at No. 22 on the Top Album Sales chart.)	3	—	
2020	A Jolly Irish Christmas (Vol. 2): Release date: 23 October 2020; Label: Rend Family Records; Format: CD, digital download	—	2	—	—	—	—	—	
2022	Whosoever: Release date: 26 August 2022; Label: Rend Family Records/Capital CMG/Sparrow Records; Format: CD, digital download	— (Note: Whosoever did not enter the OCC UK Albums Chart, but peaked at No. 31 on the OCC UK Album Downloads Chart)	5	—	—	—	—	—	
2025	Folk!: Release date: 6 June 2025; Label: Rend Family, Capitol CMG; Format: CD, LP, Digital download	—	17	—	—	—	—	—	
2025	Christmas in Belfast: Release date: 9 December 2025; Label: Rend Family, Capitol CMG; Format: Digital download	—	—	—	—	—	—	—	

=== Extended plays ===
- Christmas in Belfast (2025)
- The Evergreen Season (2026)

=== Mixtapes ===
Album details
Build Your Kingdom Here (A Rend Collective Mix Tape)
- Release date: 19 May 2017
- Label: Integrity
- Format: CD, digital download
Track listing

No.	Title	Length
1.	"Praise Like Fireworks"	2:48
2.	"My Lighthouse"	3:44
3.	"You Are My Vision"	3:55
4.	"You Bled"	4:52
5.	"More Than Conquerors"	5:21
6.	"Faithful"	4:58
7.	"Second Chance"	4:33
8.	"Build Your Kingdom Here"	4:18
9.	"Movements"	3:16
10.	"Boldly I Approach (The Art of Celebration)"	6:02
11.	"Alabaster"	3:23
12.	"Desert Soul"	6:45
13.	"Joy"	3:58
14.	"Exalt"	5:34

=== Singles ===
Year	Title	Peak chart positions				Certifications	Album
Year	Title	US Christ.	US Christ. Airplay	US Christ. AC	UK Christ.	Certifications	Album
2012	"Second Chance" (as Rend Collective Experiment)	24		—	—		Homemade Worship by Handmade People
2013	"Build Your Kingdom Here"	12		19	—		Homemade Worship by Handmade People
2014	"My Lighthouse"	17	22	24	—	RIAA: Platinum	The Art of Celebration
2015	"You Will Never Run"	19	18	21	—		As Family We Go
2016	"Joy of the Lord"	25	21	20	—		As Family We Go
2016	"Every Giant Will Fall"	—	40	—	—		As Family We Go
2017	"Rescuer (Good News)"	15	9	20	—		Good News
2018	"Counting Every Blessing"	8	4	6	—	RIAA: Gold	Good News
2019	"Your Name Is Power"	13	7	8	—		Choose to Worship
2019	"Revival Anthem"	50	—	—	—		Choose to Worship
2020	"Sing It from the Shackles"	—	—	—	—		Choose to Worship
2020	"I Choose to Worship"	44	37	—	—		Choose to Worship
2020	"Today Is the Saviour's Day"	—	—	—	—		A Jolly Irish Christmas (Vol. 2)
2020	"I Want a Hippopotamus for Christmas"	—	—	—	—		Non-album single
2020	"My Advocate"	—	34	—	—		Choose to Worship
2021	"Year of Victory"	—	—	—	—		Choose to Worship
2023	"Hallelujah Anyway"	—	4	—	—		Whosoever
2025	"Fight of My Life"	35	22	27	—		Folk!
2026	"Salt and Light"	— (Note: "Salt and Light" did not enter the Billboard Hot Christian Songs chart, but peaked at number 13 on the Christian Digital Song Sales.)	—	—	2		The Evergreen Season
2026	"Do It All Alone" (with Jervis Campbell)	46	—	—	6		The Evergreen Season
2026	"Evergreen"	—	34	—	2		The Evergreen Season

=== Other charted songs ===
Year	Title	Peak chart positions				Album
Year	Title	US Christ.	US Christ. Airplay	US Christ. AC	UK Christ.	Album
2025	"A Christmas Hymn"	44	14	6	—	Christmas in Belfast
2025	"Mary Did You Know"	—	17	14	—	Christmas in Belfast
2026	"Runaway Heart"	—	—	—	6	The Evergreen Season

=== EPs ===
Album details	Track listing
Christmas: Release Date: Label: Format:	No. / Title / Length; 1. / "Silent Night (Be still)" / 4:51; 2. / "God Rest Ye Merry Gentlemen" / 3:38; 3. / "Joyful, Joyful, We Adore Thee" / 3:32; 4. / "Emmanuel You're One of Us" / 3:40; 5. / "O Holy Night (O Night Divine)" / 5:05; 6. / "O Come All Ye Faithful (Let us Adore Him)" / 4:17
Irish: Release date: Label: Format:	No. / Title / Length; 1. / "Christmasin Killarney" / 3:07; 2. / "Today is the Saviour's Day" / 3:58; 3. / "ding Dong Merrily on High" / 1:58; 4. / "We Three Kings {We're Not Lost)" / 3:32; 5. / "Shining Light" / 4:48; 6. / "For all that You Have Done" / 4:38
Jolly: Release date: 23 October 2020; Label: Rend Family Records; Format: CD, digital download	No. / Title / Length; 1. / "Little Drummer Boy" / 3:15; 2. / "Good King Wenceslas" / 2:42; 3. / "Christmas is all Around" / 3:36; 4. / "Joy to the World" / 2:56; 5. / "Merry Christmas Everyone" / 3:07
Hallelujah Anyway: Release Date: 17 November 2023; Label: Sparrow Records, Capitol CMG; Format: Digital	No. / Title / Length; 1. / "Hallelujah Anyway" / 3:46; 2. / "Homesick" / 2:54; 3. / "Beggars to Kings" / 3:05; 4. / "Let it Roll (Live)" / 4:12; 5. / "Hallelujah Anyway (Live)" / 4:50
Folk (pt. 1): Release date: 25 October 2024; Label: Rend Family Records/Capitol CMG; Format:	No. / Title / Length; 1. / "Abide in Me" / 3:42; 2. / "What I was Made for" / 3:57; 3. / "Better than I ever thought" / 2:59; 4. / "Holy Trouble" / 2:51; 5. / "Silver or Gold" / 3:06; 6. / "Reap that Joy" / 3:25

== Awards and nominations ==
=== GMA Dove Awards ===
Year	Nominee / work	Award	Result	Ref.
2018	Good News	Worship Album of the Year	Nominated	
2019	"Counting Every Blessing"	Song of the Year	Nominated	
2020	Sparkle. Pop. Rampage.	Children's Album of the Year	Nominated	
2026	Folk!	Bluegrass/Country/Roots Album of the Year	Pending	
