= Knowing What You Know Now =

2018 studio album by Marmozets

Studio album by Marmozets
- Released: 26 January 2018
- Recorded: 2017–18
- Studios: Monnow Valley Studio (Monmouth, Wales)
- Genres: Alternative rock; post-hardcore; math rock; punk rock
- Length: 44:32
- Label: Roadrunner
- Producer: Gil Norton

Marmozets chronology
The Weird and Wonderful Marmozets (2014)	Knowing What You Know Now (2018)	Co.War.Dice (2026)

Singles from Knowing What You Know Now
- 1. "Play" Released: 4 June 2017; 2. "Habits" Released: 11 October 2017; 3. "Major System Error" Released: 11 December 2017

Knowing What You Know Now is the second studio album by English alternative rock band Marmozets, released by Roadrunner Records on 26 January 2018. It garnered positive reviews from critics who praised the band for being more straightforward with their sound while retaining their musicianship. Knowing What You Know Now peaked at number 23 on the UK Charts and spawned three singles: "Play", "Habits" and "Major System Error". The latter was nominated for the Kerrang! Award for Best Single.

== Critical reception ==
Professional ratings
Aggregate scores
Source	Rating
Metacritic	79/100
Review scores
Source	Rating
AllMusic	3.5/5 stars
DIY	4/5 stars
Drowned in Sound	5/10
The Guardian	4/5 stars
NME	4/5 stars
Renowned for Sound	4/5 stars
Rock Sound	8/10 stars

Knowing What You Know Now received positive reviews from music critics who lauded the band for retaining their musicianship while adapting a more straightforward sound. At Metacritic, which assigns a normalized rating out of 100 to reviews from mainstream critics, the album received an average score of 79, based on 9 reviews.

Lizzie Cooper-Smith of Rock Sound praised the group for refining their "unique brand of controlled chaos" throughout the record and showing confidence in their distinct musicianship to "easily fuse brashness with catchy melodies, complexity with moments where you can catch your breath", concluding that "This long-awaited second album isn’t just thrilling from start to finish: it might also be exactly what rock needs right now." Dave Simpson of The Guardian said that the group retained their trademark musicianship while also showing maturity by adopting "rave-type breakdowns, euphoric pop rushes and a tender ballad" throughout the album and displaying youthful textures that are inspired by English alternative rock acts like Kate Bush, Madness and Siouxsie and the Banshees. He concluded that despite the generic grunginess of the last two tracks he felt that Marmozets "have made their great leap forward." Thea de Gallier from NME said, "Much of the surprisingly retro sound undoubtedly comes from Norton's production techniques, but at no point does 'Knowing...' sound dated. In fact, it marks Marmozets out as a band who aren't afraid to play with their sound."

Will Richards of DIY compared the band positively to Cedric Bixler-Zavala and At the Drive-In in terms of reining in their idiosyncratic vocals and musicianship, saying "For every radio-ready chorus, there’s a fascinating tangent, and plenty of pointers towards Marmozets being the most important rock band we have." Haydon Benfield of Renowned for Sound, despite pointing out the "highly repetitious lyrics" found in "Insomnia", gave praise to Norton's production for highlighting the band's push to new musical territories on "Like a Battery" and "Run with the Rhythm" while showcasing their "punkish high-energy affairs" on the singles and lead singer Becca Macintyre for having a compelling presence in her vocal delivery, concluding that "[I]f you’re after a loud, fast, and fun album you can’t go past Marmozets’ Knowing What You Know Now." AllMusic editor John D. Buchanan commended the band for going with a more "straightforward" approach with their sound on their sophomore record, praising the instrumentation throughout the track listing and Macintyre's vocal range going from "breathless gasps and falsetto peaks to deeper notes and theatrical yelps", concluding that "[I]t sounds as if the band have outgrown the need to prove themselves with overt technicality and are happy to just enjoy rocking out."

Conversely, Cady Siregar from Drowned in Sound gave credit to each track for having pulsating energy and strong vocals, but felt there was an overabundance of angst throughout the production, lyrics that caused the songs to blend with each other and a lack of respite and wisdom to calm the listeners.

== Track listing ==
All tracks are written by Marmozets.

No.	Title	Length
1.	"Play"	3:24
2.	"Habits"	3:40
3.	"Meant to Be"	3:21
4.	"Major System Error"	3:25
5.	"Insomnia"	4:33
6.	"Lost in Translation"	3:39
7.	"Start Again"	3:23
8.	"Like a Battery"	3:29
9.	"New Religion"	3:09
10.	"Me & You"	4:43
11.	"Suffocation"	3:50
12.	"Run with the Rhythm"	3:56
Total length:		45:33

Japanese edition bonus track
No.	Title	Length
13.	"Pale Girl"	3:23
Total length:		48:04

== Credits ==
Adapted from the liner notes of Knowing What You Know Now.

=== Personnel ===
Marmozets

- Becca Macintyre – vocals
- Sam Macintyre – guitar, vocals
- Jack Bottomley – guitar
- Will Bottomley – bass, vocals
- Josh Macintyre – drums

Additional musicians

- Larry Hibbitt – percussion

Production

- Gil Norton – production
- Danny Allin – engineering, programming
- Michael H. Brauer – mixing
- Curtis Elvidge – assistant
- Matthew Glasbey – assistant
- Steve Vealey – mix assistant
- Joe LaPorta – mastering
- Tom Manning – assistant
- Callum Marinho – assistant
- Steve Vealey – mixing assistant

Artwork and design

- Florian Mihr – design
- Steve Gulick – photography

== Charts ==
Chart performance for Knowing What You Know Now
Chart (2018)	Peak position
Scottish Albums (Official Charts)	25
UK Albums (Official Charts)	23
UK Rock & Metal Albums (Official Charts)	2
