= The Art of Celebration =

Studio album by Rend Collective
- Released: 17 March 2014
- Genre: Worship, folk, indie rock
- Length: 61:29
- Label: Integrity/Columbia

Rend Collective chronology
Campfire (2013)	The Art of Celebration (2014)	Campfire Christmas, Vol. 1 (2014)

The Art of Celebration is the fourth studio album by folk-rock worship band Rend Collective. The album released on 17 March 2014 by Integrity Music and Columbia Records. The album has seen commercial success and critical acclaim.

== Critical reception ==
Professional ratings
Review scores
Source	Rating
365 Days of Inspiring Media	4/5 stars
CCM Magazine	4/5 stars
The Christian Music Review Blog	5/5 stars
CM Addict	4/5 stars
Cross Rhythms	10/10 squares
Indie Vision Music	4/5 stars
Jesus Freak Hideout	3.5/5 stars
Jesus Wired	9.5/10 stars
Louder Than the Music	4/5 stars
New Release Tuesday	5/5 stars
Worship Leader	5/5 stars

The Art of Celebration garnered critical acclaim from the ratings and reviews of music critics. At CCM Magazine, Matt Conner rated the album four stars out of five, calling this "Another passionate and powerful worship release from RCE." Tony Cummings of Cross Rhythms rated the album a perfect ten squares, remarking how this release "is quite simply a classic and the first three tracks alone will surely produce huge radio exposure and international popularity." At Worship Leader, Jeremy Armstrong rated the album a perfect five stars, and according to him "Passion meets emotion in this wonderful example of a scripturally rich, highly affecting collection of worship anthems that will serve churches around the globe." In addition, Armstrong states that "Everything matters in music designed for worship, and Rend Collective is not just aware of this, they deftly reveal the art of it."

At New Release Tuesday, Kevin Davis rated the album a perfect five stars, writing that "The Art of Celebration is the most engaging and exciting worship album I've ever heard, a bold, artful celebration." Jonathan Andre of Indie Vision Music rated the album four stars out of five, stating how the material on the release is "poignant and relatable" that "creates a great platform" for future release, and observing how there is a "sense of realness and authenticity" to the project. At Jesus Freak Hideout, Mark Rice rated the album three-and-a-half stars, saying that the release "isn't the best the Collective has offered, but fans of the group will find it hard to dislike, as will the band's worship base", and he calls it "a solid release." Andrew Funderburk of CM Addict rated the album four out of five stars, writing that "Despite being light, there is a strength that exudes from each word sung" on the release. At 365 Days of Inspiring Media, Joshua Andre rated the album four stars out of five, writing how "it's clear that Rend Collective bring so much lyrical and musical creativity throughout these 13 tracks, injecting fun, joy and life into worship."

Maddy Agers of Jesus Wired Maddy Agers rated the album nine-and-a-half stars out of ten, saying that "There is a consistent pour of love and peace throughout this album." At The Christian Music Review Blog, Jim Wilkerson rated the album a perfect five stars, stating that "If your heart desires something real - not something that was churned out to make hits and generate revenue, then I highly recommend this album." Timothy Yap of Hallels gave a positive review, saying that "And all we hear are the raw and haunting vocals of Gareth Gilkeson worshipping; here you know you have entered God's Holy presence." At Alpha Omega News, Rob Snyder graded the album an A−, writing that "The biggest clue as to what The Art of Celebration sounds like is in the title."

== Accolades ==
This album was No. 1 on the Worship Leader's Top 20 Albums of 2014 list.

The song, "Joy", was No. 4 on the Worship Leader's Top 20 Songs of 2014 list.

== Commercial performance ==
For the Billboard charting week of 5 April 2014, The Art of Celebration was the No. 13 most sold album in the entirety of the United States via the Billboard 200, and it was the No. 1 album in the Christian Albums market, with over 18,000 copies sold in its first week. The album has sold 75,000 copies in the US as of August 2015.

== Track listing ==
No.	Title	Length
1.	"Joy"	3:58
2.	"Burn Like a Star"	4:08
3.	"My Lighthouse"	3:44
4.	"More Than Conquerors"	5:21
5.	"All That I Am"	3:37
6.	"Immeasurably More"	5:33
7.	"Finally Free"	4:57
8.	"Create in Me"	3:40
9.	"Strength of My Heart"	5:07
10.	"Simplicity"	5:18
11.	"Boldly I Approach (The Art of Celebration)"	6:02
12.	"My Lighthouse (Live)"	5:39
13.	"Joy (Remix)"	4:25
Total length:		61:29

== Charts ==
Chart (2014)	Peak position
UK Albums (Official Charts Company)	28
UK Christian and Gospel Albums (OCC)	1
US Billboard 200	13
US Christian Albums (Billboard)	1
