= The Weird and Wonderful Marmozets =

Studio album by Marmozets
- Released: 29 September 2014
- Genre: Alternative rock; post-hardcore; math rock
- Length: 45:33
- Label: Roadrunner
- Producer: Larry Hibbitt

Marmozets chronology
Marmozets (2014)	The Weird and Wonderful Marmozets (2014)	Knowing What You Know Now (2018)

Singles from The Weird and Wonderful Marmozets
- 1. "Captivate You" Released: 4 June 2014

Professional ratings
Aggregate scores
Source	Rating
Metacritic	86/100
Review scores
Source	Rating
Alternative Press	4/5 stars
Drowned in Sound	8/10
The Guardian	4/5 stars
Kerrang!	5/5 stars
The Line of Best Fit	7.5/10
Metal Hammer	4.5/5 stars
The Music	3/5 stars
musicOMH	2.5/5 stars
Q	4/5 stars

The Weird and Wonderful Marmozets is the debut studio album by the English alternative rock band Marmozets. It was released by Roadrunner Records on 29 September 2014. The album was very well received by music critics, receiving a 9/10 score from Metal Hammer upon release, and winning the Kerrang! Award for Best Album in 2015. In July 2016, Metal Hammer placed the album 70th in their list of the 100 Greatest Albums of the 21st Century so far.

== Track listing ==
All tracks are written by Marmozets.

No.	Title	Length
1.	"Born Young and Free"	3:17
2.	"Why Do You Hate Me?"	3:11
3.	"Captivate You"	4:00
4.	"Is It Horrible?"	3:44
5.	"Cover Up"	3:00
6.	"Particle"	3:37
7.	"Cry"	4:33
8.	"Weird and Wonderful"	2:58
9.	"Vibetech"	3:06
10.	"Love You Good"	2:55
11.	"Hit the Wave"	3:36
12.	"Move, Shake, Hide"	3:27
13.	"Back to You"	4:09
Total length:		45:33

== Credits ==
Writing, performance and production credits are adapted from the album liner notes.

=== Personnel ===
Marmozets

- Becca Macintyre – vocals
- Sam Macintyre – guitar, vocals
- Jack Bottomley – guitar
- Will Bottomley – bass, vocals
- Josh Macintyre – drums

Additional musicians

- Larry Hibbitt – percussion, keyboard
- Sem Schaap – Piano

Production

- Larry Hibbitt – production
- James Mottershead – engineering
- Tom Woodstock – editing
- Corey Moore – assistant tracking engineer
- Michael H. Brauer – mixing
- Mark Bengston – mix assistant, Pro Tools engineering
- D. Sardy – mixing of "Why Do You Hate Me?"
  - Ryan Castle – mix engineering
  - Cameron Barton – engineering
- Joe LaPorta – mastering

Artwork and design

- Hayes Hopkinson – artwork
- Tom Barnes – photography
- Briggs Design – layout

=== Studios ===
- Chairworks, West Yorkshire, UK – tracking
- Artspace Studio, London, UK – tracking of "Move, Shake, Hide"
- Xylo Sound, London, UK – recording of vocals, overdubs
- Electric Lady Studios, New York City, NY, US – mixing
- Hillside Manor – mixing of "Why Do You Hate Me?"
- Sterling Sound, NY, USA – mastering

== Charts ==
Chart (2014)	Peak position
Scottish Albums (OCC)	28
UK Albums (OCC)	25
UK Rock & Metal Albums (OCC)	3
UK Album Downloads (OCC)	18
