= Elle Limebear =

British worship singer

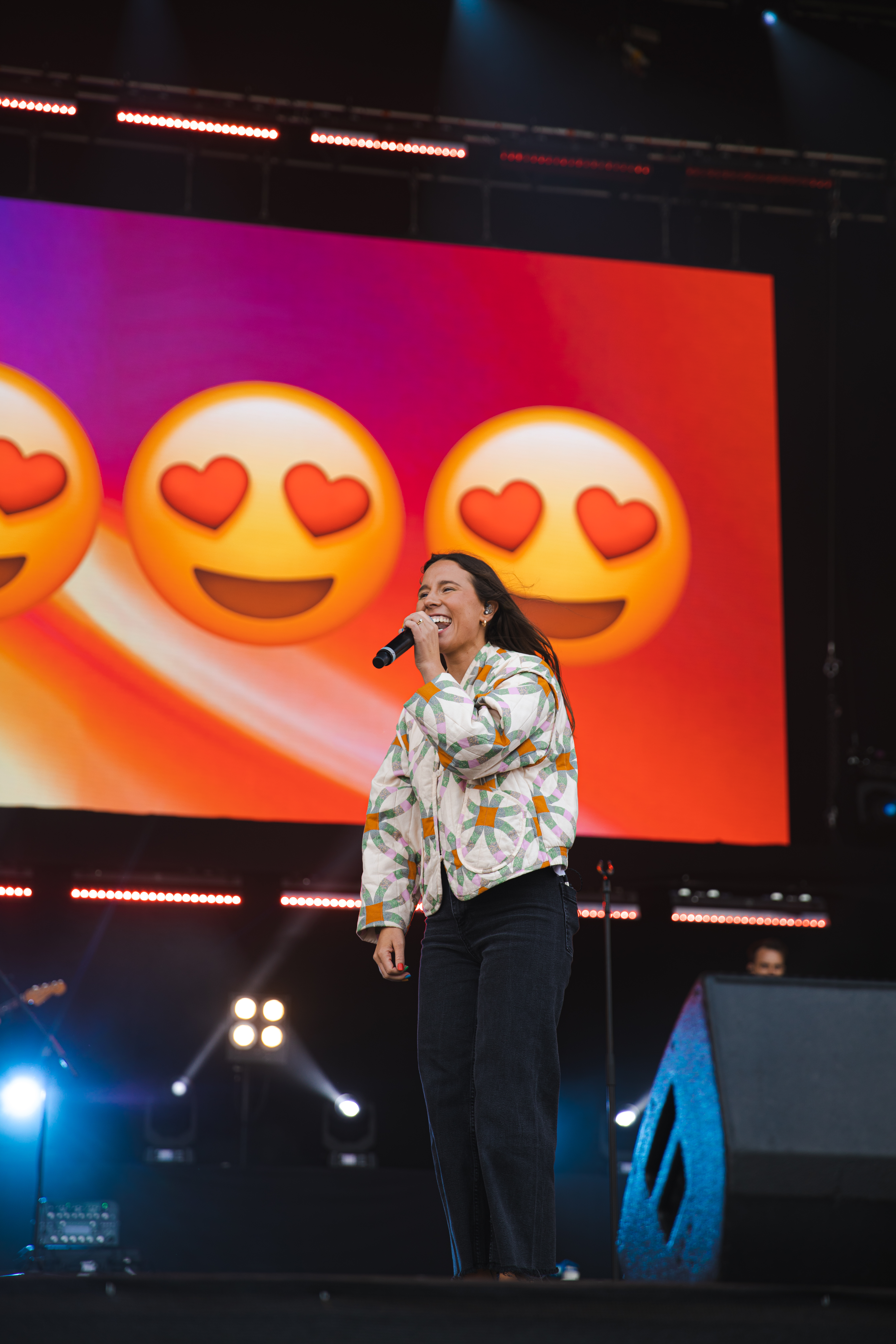
- Elle Limebear performing at the Big Church Festival at Wiston, West Sussex in 2022

Background information
- Born: Elle Limebear; April 2, 1997 (age 29)
- Genre: Contemporary worship music
- Instruments: Vocals
- Years active: 2018–present
- Labels: Decca Records (2026–present); Wings Music Group (2025–2026); Reunion Records (2018–2022)
- Website: www.ellelimebearmusic.com

Elle Limebear (née Smith; born 2 April 1997) is a British worship singer, songwriter and artist.

== Early life and family ==
Elle Limebear was born to Martin Smith and Anna Smith in 1997 in Chichester, England. She grew up in Rustington in a religious family. Her grandfather was the pastor of the local church, Arun Community Church.

In 2015, she joined her father's band and leads worship at various churches and tours. She has been married to Tom Limebear since 2017 and lives in Brighton, England. They have three children together, named Maccabee, Wilson and Billie.

== Career ==
In May 2018, she was signed by Provident Label Group, a Christian music label owned by Sony Music. Later that year, she released her first single "Love Song" in collaboration with One Sonic Society which peaked at No. 31 on the Billboard Christian Airplay Charts. In January 2019, Limebear was featured in The Own It Tour, a tour by Francesca Battistelli, along with Stars Go Dim. In June 2019, it was announced that Limebear would be part of I Am They's tour, The Trial & Triumph. In the same year, she released her first EP, titled Elle Limebear.

In February 2020, Limebear released her debut album, Lost In Wonder. In March 2020, she set out on The Roadshow 2020 tour to promote her album, but the tour was cancelled due to the COVID-19 pandemic. In November 2020, she released another EP, Live from Catalyst. The EP consists of three songs, including "Glorious Day", "Maker of the Moon", and "Lord You Have My Heart". In the same year, she was nominated for GMA Dove Award in the New Artist of the Year category.

In 2022, she received a BMI Christian Award for "Alive & Breathing" along with Matt Maher. The song had been No. 1 on Billboard's Christian Airplay Chart in 2020 for five weeks.

Limebear is also a member of a music band named Manor Collective, a group of writers, artists, producers and friends of different skin colours and cultures who first got together at a big English Manor House, in the Hampshire countryside.

In 2025, Limebear independently released her second studio album, Welcome to the Bloodline, through Wings Music Group. The album explored themes of faith, family, marriage and motherhood, and was supported by a sold-out UK headline tour.

In 2026, Limebear signed with Decca Records, becoming the label's first contemporary Christian artist. Her first single with the label, "Give Me Joy", was released in July 2026. The song topped the UK Christian & Gospel Singles Chart, reached number seven on the UK Singles Downloads Chart and peaked at number two on the UK iTunes all-genre chart.

== Discography ==
=== Albums ===
- Lost in Wonder (2020)
- Welcome to the Bloodline (2025)
- A Liturgy for Grief (2025, with Cephas Azariah)

=== EP ===
- Elle Limebear (2019)
- Live from Catalyst (2020)
- If I can Be Honest (2023, with Cephas Azariah)

=== Singles ===
==== As lead artist ====
Title	Year	Peak chart positions					Album
Title	Year	UK Christ.	UK Down.	UK Physical	UK Sales	UK Vinyl	Album
"Holding Me Still"	2019	—	—	—	—	—	Lost in Wonder
"Call on Your Name"	2019	—	—	—	—	—	Lost in Wonder
"Maker of the Moon"	2019	—	—	—	—	—	Lost in Wonder
"Find Me at Your Feet"	2019	—	—	—	—	—	Lost in Wonder
"Fly"	2019	—	—	—	—	—	Lost in Wonder
"Lord You Have My Heart" (featuring Martin Smith)	2019	—	—	—	—	—	Lost in Wonder
"What Love Looks Like"	2020	—	—	—	—	—	Lost in Wonder
"Angels" (featuring Jake Isaac)	2020	—	—	—	—	—	Lost in Wonder
"Seasons" (featuring Sarah Bird)	2020	—	—	—	—	—	Non-album singles
"Rest on Us" (Maverick City Music and Upperroom cover)	2023	—	—	—	—	—	Non-album singles
"The Healing Song" (with Cephas Azariah)	2023	—	—	—	—	—	If I Can Be Honest
"Closer" (with Cephas Azariah)	2023	—	—	—	—	—	If I Can Be Honest
"Bye Fear"	2024	—	—	—	—	—	Welcome to the Bloodline
"Soar"	2024	—	—	—	—	—	Welcome to the Bloodline
"One God" (featuring CalledOut Music)	2025	—	—	—	—	—	Welcome to the Bloodline
"Vulnerable" (featuring Samm Henshaw)	2025	—	—	—	—	—	Welcome to the Bloodline
"Every Good Thing" (featuring Zo Ross-Waddell and Evie Loose)	2025	—	—	—	—	—	Non-album single
"Searching" (with Cephas Azariah)	2025	—	—	—	—	—	A Liturgy for Grief
"You're Gonna Be Okay" (with Cephas Azariah)	2025	—	—	—	—	—	A Liturgy for Grief
"Give Me Joy"	2026	1	6	14	7	9	Non-album single
"—" denotes a recording that did not chart or was not released in that territory.

==== As featured artist ====
Title	Year	Peak chart positions					Album
Title	Year	US Christ.	US Christ. Air.	US Christ. AC	US Christ. Digital	US Christ. Stream.	Album
"Love Song" (One Sonic Society featuring Elle Limebear)	2018	—	31	—	—	—	Non-album single
"After Your Heart" (SEU Worship featuring Dan Rivera and Elle Limebear)	2020	—	—	—	—	—	Clouds are Clearing
"Alive and Breathing" (Matt Maher featuring Elle Limebear)	2020	5	1	1	19	22	Alive and Breathing
"Fruit" (Gaedan Judd featuring Elle Limebear)	2023	—	—	—	—	—	Upperroom
"Over" (Limoblaze featuring Elle Limebear)	2023	—	—	—	—	—	Non-album single
"Before" (Boundless featuring Nathan Jess and Elle Limebear)	2025	—	—	—	—	—	Boundless
"Offering" (Jake and Mates featuring Elle Limebear)	2025	—	—	—	—	—	Songs of Deliverance
"Joy" (Limoblaze featuring Elle Limebear)	2026	—	—	—	—	—	Solid Ground
"—" denotes a recording that did not chart or was not released in that territory.

== Awards and recognition ==
- GMA Dove Award Nominee (2020)
- BMI Christian Award (2022)
- A Step FWD Awards Female Artist of the Year (2025)
- A Step FWD Awards Album of the Year – Welcome to the Bloodline (2025)
- A Step FWD Awards Indie / Folk / Acoustic Song of the Year – "Vulnerable" (2025)
