= Official Christian & Gospel Singles Chart =

British music chart

Logo for the Official Christian & Gospel Singles Chart

The Official Christian & Gospel Singles Chart is a record chart compiled weekly by the Official Charts Company on behalf of the music industry of the United Kingdom. The twenty-position chart tabulates the best-selling songs of the week in the genres of Christian and gospel music, based on digital download, streaming, CD, and LP sales, tracking songs by British performers and under twelve months old.

The chart was first official launched on 6 March 2026 in partnership with AStepFWD, and the first number one hit was "Kumbaya" by Jerub, which would go on to spend a cumulative ten weeks atop the chart. The chart is announced each Friday weekly on BBC Radio 1. The current leader on the chart is Bethel Music and Aubree Archibeck's "Greatness".

== Achievements ==
=== Songs achievements ===
==== Most weeks at number one ====
Weeks	Artist	Song	Year	Ref.
10	Jerub	"Kumbaya"	2026	
9	Elle Limebear	"Give Me Joy"	2026	
3	Min.Adeoluwa	"This God"	2026	
3	Cammy Barnes and Rend Collective	"Something More"	2026	

==== Number-one debuts ====
Five songs have debuted at number one without having previously entered the chart. These are:

- Jerub – "Kumbaya" (6 March 2026)
- Thiago and DC3 – "Valley" (27 March 2026)
- Chantelle Rutendo – "There's This King I Know" (10 April 2026)
- Imrhan and Leostaystrill – "Finished Businees" (5 June 2026)
- Elle Limebear – "Give Me Joy" (31 July 2026)
- Bethel Music and Aubree Archibeck – "Greatness" (4 November 2026)

=== Artist achievements ===
==== Most weeks at number one ====
Weeks	Artist	Ref.
10	Jerub	
9	Elle Limebear	
7	Min.Adeoluwa	(Note: Attributed to multiple sources:)
3	Cammy Barnes	
3	Rend Collective	

==== Most charted hits ====
Singles	Artist	Ref.
10	Min.Adeoluwa	(Note: Attributed to multiple sources:)
6	Chantelle Rutendo	
6	CalledOut Music	
6	Rend Collective	(Note: Attributed to multiple sources:)
5	Y Shadey	
5	Philippa Hanna	(Note: Attributed to multiple sources:)
5	Israel Houghton	
5	KXC	(Note: Attributed to multiple sources:)

==== Most top ten hits ====
Singles	Artist	Ref.
7	Min.Adeoluwa	(Note: Attributed to multiple sources:)
6	Rend Collective	(Note: Attributed to multiple sources:)
5	CalledOut Music	
5	Chantelle Rutendo	

==== Most number one hits ====
Singles	Artist	Ref.
3	Min.Adeoluwa	(Note: Attributed to multiple sources:)

== Number ones ==
No.	Week	Artist	Single	Ref.		
2026
1	6 March	Jerub	"Kumbaya"			
1	13 March	Jerub	"Kumbaya"			
1	20 March	Jerub	"Kumbaya"			
2	27 March	Thiago and DC3	"Valley"			
2	3 April	Thiago and DC3	"Valley"			
3	10 April	Chantelle Rutendo	"There's This King That I Know"			
re	17 April	Jerub	"Kumbaya"			
re	24 April	Jerub	"Kumbaya"			
re	1 May	Jerub	"Kumbaya"			
re	8 May	Jerub	"Kumbaya"			
re	15 May	Jerub	"Kumbaya"			
re	22 May	Jerub	"Kumbaya"			
re	29 May	Jerub	"Kumbaya"			
4	5 June	Imrhan and Leostaytrill	"Finished Businees"			
5	12 June	Guvna B	"Rest My Head"			
6	19 June	Min.Adeoluwa	"This God"			
6	26 June	Min.Adeoluwa	"This God"			
6	3 July	Min.Adeoluwa	"This God"			
7	10 July	MS Debola and Min.Adeoluwa	"SOG (Song of Gratitude)"			
8	17 July	Culture CNNCT and Soundsdubetter	"Guide Me II"			
re	24 July	MS Debola and Min.Adeoluwa	"SOG (Song of Gratitude)"			
9	31 July	Elle Limebear	"Give Me Joy"			
9	7 August	Elle Limebear	"Give Me Joy"			
9	14 August	Elle Limebear	"Give Me Joy"			
9	21 August	Elle Limebear	"Give Me Joy"			
9	28 August	Elle Limebear	"Give Me Joy"			
9	4 September	Elle Limebear	"Give Me Joy"			
11	11 September	Min.Adeoluwa	"Psalm 91"			
11	18 September	Min.Adeoluwa	"Psalm 91"			
re	25 September	Elle Limebear	"Give Me Joy"			
12	2 October	Cammy Barnes and Rend Collective	"Something More"			
12	9 October	Cammy Barnes and Rend Collective	"Something More"			
re	16 October	Elle Limebear	"Give Me Joy"			
re	23 October	Elle Limebear	"Give Me Joy"			
re	30 October	Cammy Barnes and Rend Collective	"Something More"			
13	6 November	Cammy Barnes and Rend Collective	"Something More"		Bethel Music and Aubree Archibeck	"Greatness"

== See also ==
- UK Singles Chart
- Official Christian & Gospel Albums Chart
- Hot Christian Songs
