= Homemade Worship by Handmade People =

Studio album by Rend Collective Experiment
- Released: 10 January 2012
- Genres: Experimental, folk rock, worship
- Length: 45:06
- Label: Kingsway
- Producer: Gareth Gilkeson

Rend Collective Experiment chronology
Organic Family Hymnal (2010)	Homemade Worship by Handmade People (2012)	Campfire (2013)

Homemade Worship by Handmade People is the second studio album released by Christian contemporary worship music band Rend Collective Experiment on 10 January 2012, and the album was released and published under the Kingsway Music label.

== Background ==
The song "You Are My Vision" is a translation of the song "Be Thou My Vision", which the Gilkeson said "'as we translated the song from the Irish and the Old English, we soon realized the true meaning of the words were starting to get lost in our culture'". Furthermore, Gilkeson said "'This is not a song of longing and asking God to 'be our vision,' but it is a song of declaration and faith. We say to God with strength, trust and humanity that 'You are my vision, You are my wisdom… You are my battle shield.'"

The song "Second Chance," according to Gilkeson, focuses on the redemptive power of the Cross and not wallowing in "failures and personal mistakes." The Cross which is "about the grace of God and not about the Law of God." Gilkeson said the Bible verses used in the song come from John 8:10-12.

== Critical reception ==
Professional ratings
Review scores
Source	Rating
All About Worship	5/5 stars
Allmusic	4/5 stars
CCM Magazine	3/5 stars
CHRISTCORE	5/5 stars
Christian Manifesto	5/5 stars
Christian Music Zine	4/5 stars
Christianity Today	4/5 stars
Cross Rhythms	9/10 stars
Indie Vision Music	4/5 stars
Jesus Freak Hideout	4/5 stars 3.5/5 stars
Louder Than the Music	5/5 stars
New Release Tuesday	5/5 stars
The Phantom Tollbooth	4/5 stars

All About Worship's Mathew Reames said the album "sets the bar high for worship in 2012. Even if you decide that there isn’t a single song you can use in your church, you want this album because you will enjoy this album...It is a breath of fresh air in a worship culture that often finds itself pigeonholed into one sound." Allmusic's Jon O'Brien said that album "could well be the record that truly transcends the scene's core audience. Indeed, it's a spiritual album that doesn't necessarily have to be for spiritual people, thanks to a warm, rich, and inviting acoustic sound". O'Brien went onto write "whether you choose to listen to it as a celebratory worship experience or just a conventional pop/rock album, Homemade Worship by Handmade People works on both levels." Alpha Omega News' Rob Snyder graded the album an A, and said "a excellent release of original praise and worship music that was recorded in Irish church halls and homes in the band’s organic, collective style. What I find refreshing about this group is that they don’t believe in being in the limelight."

At CCM Magazine, Andrew Greer said the album is "ripe with rich theology and authentic melodies". Greer wrote that the album "is a fresh, singable take on modern worship." CHRISTCORE's Sara Napier said that is "an album bursting with infectious rhythm, heartfelt lyrics, talent, passion and thought-provoking titles, I don’t see how anyone could pass this one up." Christian Manifesto's Lydia Akinola wrote "the music is refreshingly free of overproduction and overworking." Christina Music Zine's David Huey said the album is "powerful, positive, and on top of that, actually listenable." At Christianity Today, Robert Ham said that album contains some "stomping, rollicking music." Cross Rhythms' Elliot Rose said that Rend Collective Experiment "have clearly found their niche, a unique and distinctive sound - an experiment with exceptional results" with respect to this album.

Indie Vision Music's Jonathan Andre said "listening to the album through, I can boldly claim Rend Collective Experiment will assert themselves in the CCM industry, with refreshing sounds and musical uniqueness that places this album as one of the most underrated albums of 2012 so far!" Andre wrote "Rend Collective Experiment have served up 11 tracks of pure worshipful moments where the listener is lost in praise." Andre summed up by saying that the album "for anyone that needs some joy in the midst of daily life. Full of musical genius from 1 to 11; well done Rend Collective for such a captivating experience!" Jesus Freak Hideout's Ryan Barbee said "there are some resemblances to their last release, but overall they aren't letting it just stay at the same level. A number of the songs are more accessible to corporate church gatherings, which should make worship leaders happy. Plus, it's really good music." Furthermore, Barbee wrote that they have made progression in the music. Jesus Freak Hideout's Sam Schaumberg said "while this collection diversifies from the group's debut and features more folk and grandstand worship aspects, it remains a beautiful compilation crafted by musicians clearly in awe of God."

Louder Than the Music's Jono Davies wrote "I love all the songs for different reasons and that's what makes a great album, a mix of styles and sounds but keeping to a great theme. The whole albums feels like a journey." New Release Tuesday's Kevin Davis said the album "is the kind of unique worship album I've only dreamed was possible and is an incredible", and he wrote the album "is truly a memorable worship experience." The Phantom Tollbooth's Derek Walker said "analyse it deeply and there is not that much new, but it is the original and authentic touches that make Rend Collective such a different experience. They draw from outside Nashville and feel very much of now. Good on them - the experiment has truly worked."

== Track listing ==
All tracks are written by Rend Collective Experiment.

Homemade Worship by Handmade People
No.	Title	Length
1.	"Praise Like Fireworks"	2:48
2.	"You Are My Vision"	3:53
3.	"The Cost"	3:28
4.	"Second Chance"	4:33
5.	"True Intimacy"	4:02
6.	"Build Your Kingdom Here"	4:17
7.	"Desert Soul"	6:45
8.	"Christ Has Set Me Free"	2:21
9.	"Keep Me Near"	5:23
10.	"Alabaster"	3:24
11.	"Shining Star"	4:12
Total length:		45:06

== Charts ==
=== Album ===
Chart (2012)	Peak position
US Billboard Christian Albums	23
US Billboard Heatseekers Albums	14

=== Singles ===
Year	Single	Peak chart positions
Year	Single	US Christian Songs
2012	"Second Chance"	24
