= Death, death to the IDF =

Political chant

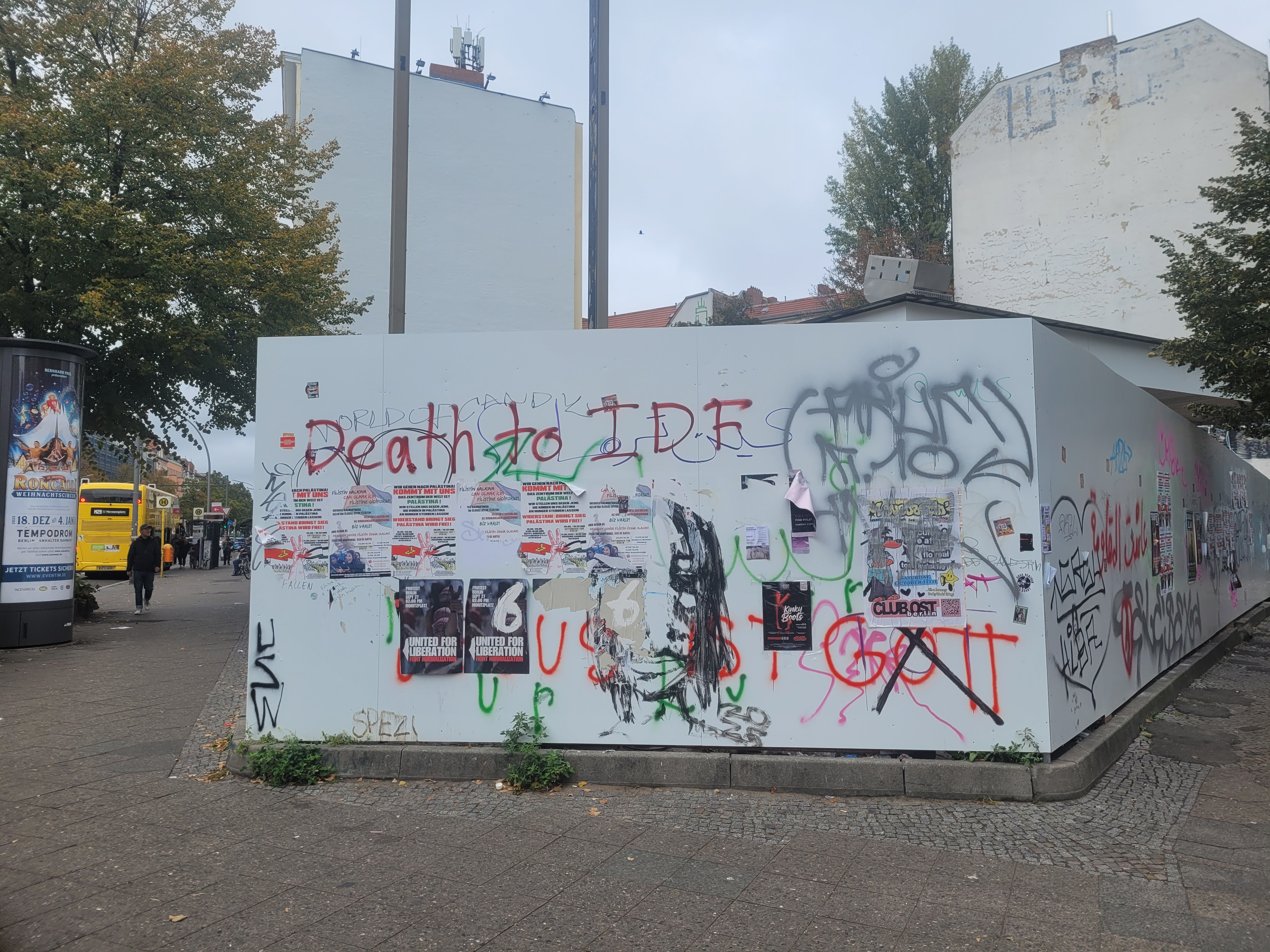
"Death to IDF" graffito in Berlin, 2025.

"Death, death to the IDF", or DDTTIDF or DDTTIOF, is a political chant and slogan that emerged during the Gaza war and Gaza genocide in protest against the Israel Defense Forces (IDF), Israel's military. It was used by the punk-rap duo Bob Vylan during a performance at the 2025 Glastonbury Festival, and it has since been heard at Gaza war protests worldwide.

== Origin ==
In the weeks leading to the 2025 Glastonbury Festival, several British politicians, including Prime Minister Keir Starmer, called for hip-hop group Kneecap to be removed from the line-up. On 28 June 2025, just hours before the show, the BBC announced that it would not broadcast live Kneecap's concert that evening, but would make it available on-demand once it had reviewed the performance.

Kneecap are known for their support for Palestinian rights so BBC's decision lead to some supporters interpreting it as an act of censorship. In reaction to this, before Kneecap's set, punk-rap duo Bob Vylan performed and took advantage of the fact that their set was live-streamed to show public support for Palestine. Between songs, the audience chanted "Free, free Palestine" and waved at least 200 Palestinian flags. Singer-guitarist Bobby Vylan called out to the crowd: "Alright, but have you heard this one, though? Death, death to the IDF!". The audience proceeded to chant with him. During the chants, the band also projected the message "Free Palestine. The United Nations have called it a genocide. The BBC calls it a 'conflict'."

== Reactions ==
The chant led to widespread criticism and condemnation. Police opened an investigation into whether the chant constituted hate speech or incitement to violence. After the festival, a video surfaced showing Bobby saying to the crowd at Alexandra Palace in London on 28 May 2025: "Death to every single IDF soldier out there as an agent of terror for Israel. Death to the IDF".

Glastonbury Festival co-organizer Emily Eavis said she was "appalled" by the comments, which contradicted the festival's ethos of "hope, unity, peace and love". A BBC spokesperson apologized for the "deeply offensive" content, removed it from streaming on BBC iPlayer and that they "should have pulled [it] during the performance". BBC staff members called for resignations over the broadcast. Culture Secretary Lisa Nandy spoke to BBC Director-General Tim Davie to learn "what due diligence" the BBC carried out prior to broadcasting the act, given they had declined to broadcast Kneecap's set live amid similar controversy.

=== Accusations of antisemitism ===
According to the Guardian, some see it as valid political speech, but others found it "antisemitic" and "incitement to violence". The Israeli embassy stated that the chants were "inflammatory and hateful rhetoric" and glorified violence. Chief Rabbi Sir Ephraim Mirvis condemned the broadcast as "a national shame" and an example of "vile Jew hatred". Avon and Somerset Police opened a criminal investigation into the band over the chant. The US Department of State revoked the duo's entry visas ahead of a planned autumn tour. United Talent Agency dropped the group as a client after the incident. They were also removed from the lineups of Radar Festival in Manchester and Kave Fest.

Prime Minister Keir Starmer described the performance as "appalling hate speech". Conservative leader Kemi Badenoch called the scene "grotesque", writing that "glorifying violence against Jews isn't edgy". Health secretary Wes Streeting described the chant as "appalling", and said the "irony of that music festival is that Israelis were taken from a music festival, killed, raped and in some cases are still being held captive".

The band's 2024 album Humble As The Sun surged back up the music charts, reaching the top of the UK Hip Hop and R&B albums chart as well as number 7 on the Official Album Downloads Chart and number 8 on the Official Independent Albums Chart. At their first UK concert after the festival, at London's 100 Club, the crowd started to chant "Death to the IDF". Bobby urged them to stop, saying "you'll get me in trouble", and instead led a chant of "Free Palestine".

The Community Security Trust, a UK charity that monitors antisemitism, reported that the day after the band's performance, saw the highest daily number of antisemitic incidents recorded in the UK during the first half of the year. The organisation described the chants as "utterly chilling", and noted how rhetoric against Israel can inflame antisemitic sentiment. Home Secretary Yvette Cooper acknowledged the report's findings and affirmed the "government's commitment to root out anti-Semitism".

=== Support for the chant ===
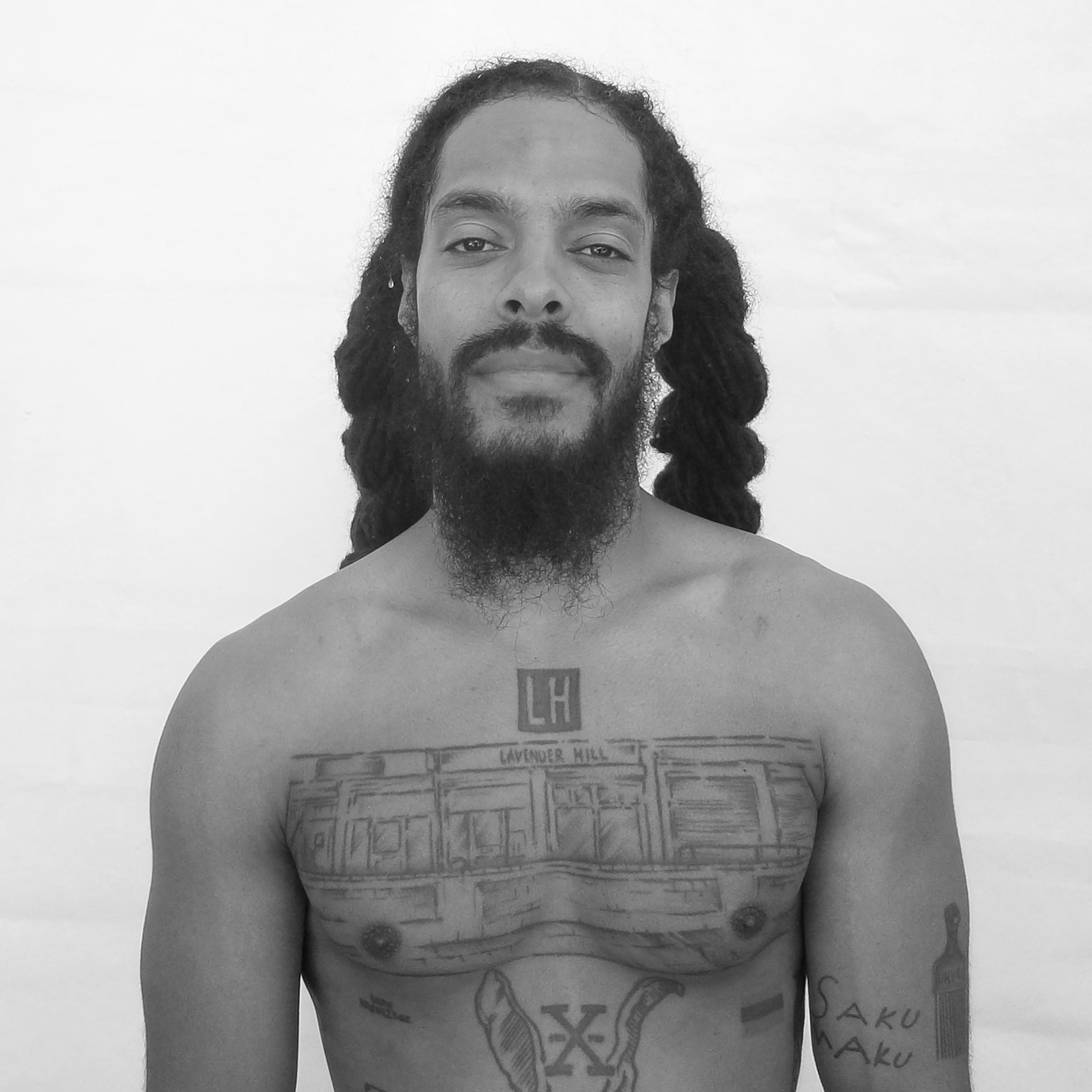
Bobby Vylan in 2025

In a statement, the band said they believed they were being "targeted for speaking up" about the Gaza war. Bobbie Vylan criticized the reactions in a statement: "They want to control this country's narrative to frame genocide as Israel defending itself". The band also wrote that "We are not for the death of Jews, Arabs or any other race or group of people. We are for the dismantling of a violent military machine. A machine whose own soldiers were told to use 'unnecessary lethal force' against innocent civilians waiting for aid. A machine that has destroyed much of Gaza. We, like those in the spotlight before us, are not the story. We are a distraction [...] The government doesn't want us to ask them why they remain silent in the face of this atrocity? To ask why they aren't doing more to stop the killing? To feed the starving? [...] We are being targeted for speaking up".

The bands Massive Attack, Fontaines D.C., and Amyl and the Sniffers spoke in support of Bob Vylan. Musician Grandson said, "As a Jewish artist, I am deeply offended by the conflation of criticism against a military force known for their indiscriminate violence with antisemitism". Lawyer Jolyon Maugham questioned whether the comments constituted a crime, since they were directed towards the Israeli military rather than Jewish people. Journalist Archie Bland wrote that the actions of the Israeli military were the "obvious" focus of the chant, and criticized the amount of coverage it received.

Socialist Jewish activist Naomi Wimborne-Idrissi said: "He didn't say death to Israelis [civilians], he said death to the IDF, a murderous armed force. His slogan is already being taken up on demos in Australia and elsewhere. It's not calculated to win people of a delicate disposition to the cause, but if you try to repress legitimate outrage against a televised genocide, this is what you will get".

On 13 September 2025, the band led another "Death to the IDF" chant during a performance in Amsterdam, which was also chanted by people outside the venue. Bobby Vylan also told the audience "Fuck the fascists, fuck the Zionists. Go find them in the streets". The Dutch Public Prosecution Service announced an investigation into the incident, which was condemned by multiple Dutch MPs across the political spectrum. However, a court in Nijmegen later ruled that a scheduled Monday concert could proceed, rejecting a local safety authority's attempt to ban it on the grounds that the band's lyrics were "too offensive". The judge found no evidence that the performance would lead to immediate public disorder.

In October 2025, Bobby Vylan was featured on Louis Theroux's podcast in October 2025, during an interview one journalist described as "softball". Bobby stated that he did not regret leading chants of "death to the IDF" and would "do it again tomorrow". Soon after, British Airways withdrew its advertising from Theroux's podcast in response.

== Usage in protests and urban art ==
In the United Kingdom, "Death, death to the IDF" has been heard alongside "Israel is a terror state" and "From the river to the sea, Palestine will be free". The slogan was chanted by Palestine Action support outside Woolwich Crown Court. Other pro-Palestinian rallies, including those in Cape Town, Dublin, Melbourne, and New Orleans, have reported the use of similar chants, sometimes substituting "IDF" with "IOF" ("Israeli Occupation Forces").

In July 2025, activists graffited the chant on a university building at the Massachusetts Institute of Technology, as well as DAMPL (Direct Action Movement for Palestinian Liberation). The defacing was shared on social media with the soundtrack of a remix of Bobby Vylan's chant at the Glastonbury festival. In Northern Ireland, "Death Death to the I.O.F" was graffited near the Royal Victoria Hospital on the Falls Road by a Republican group called Lasair Dhearg.

In August 2025, "death to the IDF" graffiti was spray-painted on a road outside the home of an American veteran of the Israel Defense Forces in St. Louis. Several cars were also set on fire. A hate crime inquiry was open after Jewish organizations and the Trump administration called the attack antisemitic.

In October 2025, a train in Antwerp, Belgium, was spotted with the slogan "death to the IDF" graffited along its carriages. A spokesperson of the Belgian railway company NMBS said that the graffiti was removed immediately.

== See also ==
- Anti-Zionism
- Antisemitism in the United Kingdom
- Death to Israel
- Hate speech
- Israeli–Palestinian conflict
- Israeli war crimes
- From the river to the sea
- "May Your Village Burn"
