= Campfire Christmas, Vol. 1 =

Studio album by Rend Collective
- Released: 17 November 2014
- Genre: Worship, contemporary Christian music, folk rock
- Length: 36:01
- Label: Integrity

Rend Collective chronology
The Art of Celebration (2014)	Campfire Christmas, Vol. 1 (2014)	As Family We Go (2015)

Campfire Christmas, Vo1. 1 is a Christmas album from Rend Collective. Integrity Music released the album on 17 November 2014.

== Critical reception ==
Professional ratings
Review scores
Source	Rating
365 Days of Inspiring Media	4/5 stars
CCM Magazine	4/5 stars
Cross Rhythms	8/10 squares
Jesus Freak Hideout	4/5 stars
Louder Than the Music	5/5 stars
New Release Today	4.5/5 stars

Indicating in a four star review from CCM Magazine, Matt Conner says, "the band brings significant joy through their yuletide inventions". Steve Leggett, reviewing the album for AllMusic, writes, "This Christmas album, recorded live around a campfire, is an acoustic, spontaneous affair, very organic in feel, and full of communal spiritual joy." Awarding the album four and a half stars at New Release Today, Christopher Thiessen states, "Their quirky knack for joyful celebration, as well as their awe of the glory of God, remind us of the important things during this Christmas season." Tony Cummings, rating the album an eight out of ten from Cross Rhythms, says, "a pretty good set to add some Celtic joy to your Christmas celebrations." Indicating in a four star review at Jesus Freak Hideout, Scott Fryberger responds, "Even if you aren't into the band's studio albums, you still may find something worthwhile here." Jono Davies, assigning a five star rating on the album for Louder Than the Music, replies, "If you're looking for foot tapping, stripped down, atmospheric Christmas songs, then grab a copy of this brilliant Christmas album!" Signaling in a four star review from 365 Days of Inspiring Media, Jonathan Andre describes, "Well done Chris and the team for such a heartfelt and poignant Christmas album, and one of my favourite acoustic-style albums of 2014 so far!"

== Track listing ==
No.	Title	Length
1.	"We Wish You a Merry Christmas"	1:04
2.	"Hark! The Herald Angels Sing (Glory in the Highest)"	3:33
3.	"Ding Dong Merrily on High (The Celebration's Starting)"	1:57
4.	"Joy to the World (You Are My Joy)"	2:55
5.	"O Come All Ye Faithful (Let Us Adore Him)"	4:16
6.	"Shining Light"	4:48
7.	"O Holy Night (O Night Divine)"	5:05
8.	"Joyful, Joyful, We Adore Thee (Rejoice Rejoice)"	3:32
9.	"A Joyful Reprise"	1:07
10.	"Merry Christmas Everyone"	3:06
11.	"For All That You Have Done"	4:38
Total length:		36:01

== Charts ==
Chart (2014)	Peak position
UK Album Downloads (OCC)	44
UK Christian & Gospel Albums (OCC)	1
US Billboard 200	61
US Top Christian Albums (Billboard)	4
US Digital Albums (Billboard)	20
US Independent Albums (Billboard)	8
