= Give Me Joy =

Single by Elle Limebear
- Released: 24 July 2026
- Venue: Bath and West Showground (Shepton Mallet, England)
- Length: 4:43
- Label: Decca
- Songwriters: Elle Limebear; Féz Ogunseyinde; Joshua Grimmett; Martin Smith
- Producer: Joshua Fraser

Elle Limebear singles chronology
"You're Gonna Be Okay" (2025)	"Give Me Joy" (2026)

Music video
- "Give Me Joy" on YouTube

"Give Me Joy" is a song recorded live by the British worship musician Elle Limebear. It was cowritten by Limebear herself alongside Féz Ogunseyinde, Joshua Grimmett, and Martin Smith, while Joshua Fraser produced. The song was released on 24 July 2026, via Decca Records, to digital download, streaming, and LP formats. Met with immediate commercial success, it opened atop the Official Charts Company's Official Christian & Gospel Singles Chart as well as entering the top ten in several other charts. The song's success marked Limebear's first leader on a United Kingdom record chart, as well as her first leader as a solo musician.

== Background and release ==
On 29 July 2026, it was announced that Limebear had signed with Decca, becoming the first contemporary Christian musician to be signed to the label. "Give Me Joy" was recorded live at Satellites Youth Festival, held at the Bath and West Showground in Shepton Mallet, England. Limebear did not have initial plans to release the track internationally, but felt compelled to upon seeing its response at the festival. Upon release, the song was promoted with the release of an official music video, which was uploaded to YouTube.

== Composition ==
Limebear cowrote "Give Me Joy" alongside Ogunseyinde, Grimmett, and Smith, while Fraser arranged and produced. It is centered around the traditional hymn "Oil in My Lamp", and includes the original song's chorus. Running for a duration of four minutes and 43 seconds, it is composed in the key of E with a tempo of 130 beats per minute and a musical time signature of 4/4. Limebear explained the concept behind the song, saying:

"Give Me Joy" came from a really simple idea: taking something that so many of us grew up singing and reworking it for a new generation. My hope is that it gives people a glimpse of the joy that my faith has given me, the kind of joy that carries us through every season and doesn’t disappear when life gets difficult.

== Reception ==
"Give Me Joy" was commercially successful upon release, debuting atop the Official Christian & Gospel Singles Chart. Concurrently, the track also appeared in the top ten in several other charts, including the UK Singles Downloads Chart, UK Singles Sales Chart, and the UK Vinyl Singles Chart, where the track peaked at numbers 6, 7, and 9, respectively. It also peaked at number 14 on the UK Physical Singles Chart. "Give Me Joy" marked Limebear's second chart-topping song and her first as a solo musician, as well as her first number one in her home country.

== Personnel ==
Credits adapted from Apple Music.

- Cephas Azariah – keyboards
- Elle Limebear – vocals, writer
- Evie Loose – background vocals
- Féz Ogunseyinde – writer
- Joshua Fraser – bass, arranger, producer, mixer
- Joshua Grimmett – writer
- Jonny Bird – masterer
- Levi Smith – guitar
- Martin Smith – writer
- Noah Smith – drums
- Sam Jackson – engineer
- Zo Ross-Waddell – background vocals

== Charts ==
Chart performance for "Give Me Joy"
Chart (2026)	Peak position
UK Christian & Gospel Singles (OCC)	1
UK Physical Singles (OCC)	14
UK Singles Downloads (OCC)	6
UK Singles Sales (OCC)	7
UK Vinyl Singles (OCC)	9

== Release history ==
Release history and formats for "Give Me Joy"
Region	Date	Format(s)	Label(s)
Various	24 July 2026	Digital download; streaming; LP	Decca
