= Bob Vylan Presents the Price of Life =

Studio album by Bob Vylan
- Released: 22 April 2022
- Genre: Punk rap
- Length: 34:09
- Label: Ghost Theatre
- Producer: Bob Vylan

Bob Vylan chronology
We Live Here (2020)	Bob Vylan Presents the Price of Life (2022)	Humble as the Sun (2024)

Professional ratings
Aggregate scores
Source	Rating
AnyDecentMusic?	8.3/10
Metacritic	85/100
Review scores
Source	Rating
Clash	9/10
Classic Rock	4/5 stars
The Daily Telegraph	4/5 stars
DIY	4.5/5 stars
Gigwise	9/10 stars
The Guardian	3/5 stars
Kerrang!	5/5
The Line of Best Fit	8/10
Mojo	4/5 stars
NME	4/5 stars

Bob Vylan Presents the Price of Life is the second studio album by London-based duo Bob Vylan, released on 22 April 2022 by Ghost Theatre. The album was produced, mixed and recorded by the duo, with contributions from Laurent 'Lags' Barnard of Gallows, Bobby Bentham of Strange Bones, and Josh and Jon Skints (Joshua Waters Rudge and Jonathan Doyle) of the Skints. Upon its release, the album was met with universal critical acclaim.

The album was named Best Album at the 2022 Kerrang! Awards.

== Track listing ==
Bob Vylan Presents the Price of Life track listing
No.	Title	Length
1.	"Walter Speaks"	0:14
2.	"Wicked & Bad"	2:30
3.	"Big Man"	2:16
4.	"Take That"	2:54
5.	"Health Is Wealth"	2:51
6.	"He Sold Guns"	3:08
7.	"Must Be More"	2:27
8.	"Pretty Songs"	2:44
9.	"Censored" (interlude)	0:35
10.	"Turn Off the Radio"	1:55
11.	"GDP"	3:22
12.	"Bait the Bear"	2:33
13.	"Phone Tap"	1:55
14.	"Drug War"	2:32
15.	"Whatchugonnado?"	2:13
Total length:		34:09
