= Build Your Kingdom Here =

Single by Rend Collective

from the album Homemade Worship by Handmade People
- Released: 2012
- Genre: Christian country; country pop; folk rock
- Songwriters: Gareth Gilkeson: Chris Llewellyn; Will Herron

Rend Collective singles chronology
"Second Chance"	"Build Your Kingdom Here"	"My Lighthouse"

Music video
- "Build Your Kingdom Here" Video on YouTube

"Build Your Kingdom Here" is a song performed by Northern Irish Christian folk rock worship band Rend Collective. The song was released as a single from their 2012 album Homemade Worship by Handmade People in 2013. The song peaked at No.12 on the US Hot Christian Songs chart.

== Background ==
"Build Your Kingdom Here" was released on 27 January 2012, as the second single from their second studio album Homemade Worship by Handmade People. Greg Fromholz directed the official video for the song, which has nearly 19 million views as of August 2020.

== Charts ==
=== Weekly charts ===
Chart (2013)	Peak position
US Christian AC (Billboard)	19
US Christian Airplay (Billboard)	12
US Christian Songs (Billboard)	12
US Christian AC Indicator (Billboard)	8

=== Year-end charts ===
Chart (2013)	Peak position
US Christian Songs (Billboard)	40
