= As Family We Go =

Studio album by Rend Collective
- Released: 21 August 2015
- Genre: Contemporary worship music, contemporary Christian music, folk rock
- Length: 43:12
- Label: Sparrow, Capitol CMG

Rend Collective chronology
Campfire Christmas, Vol. 1 (2014)	As Family We Go (2015)	Campfire II: Simplicity (2016)

Singles from As Family We Go
- 1. "You Will Never Run" Released: 10 July 2015; 2. "Every Giant Will Fall" Released: 24 July 2015; 3. "One and Only" Released: 7 August 2015; 4. "The Artist" Released: 14 August 2015; 5. "Ireland's Call" Released: 21 August 2015

As Family We Go is the fifth studio album by Rend Collective. Sparrow Records alongside Capitol Christian Music Group released the album on 21 August 2015.

== Critical reception ==
Professional ratings
Review scores
Source	Rating
365 Days of Inspiring Media	4.5/5 stars
CCM Magazine	4/5 stars
Christian Music Review	4.7/5
Cross Rhythms	6/10 squares
Jesus Freak Hideout	3.5/5 stars 4/5 stars
Jesus Wired	7/10 stars
Louder Than the Music	5/5 stars
New Release Today	4.5/5 stars
PPCORN	5/5 stars
Worship Leader	5/5 stars

Giving the album four stars at CCM Magazine, Matt Conner describes, "As Family We Go brings a communal theme to the table, a nod to both the familial bonds between the band members and the greater church family they are addressing." Jessica Morris, signaling in a five star review at PPCORN, replies, "there are no weak points." Indicating in a five star review from Worship Leader, Gary Durbin responds, "In all honesty, the entire album is ... excellent." Indicating in a four and a half star review at New Release Today, Kevin Davis replies, "All of the tracks really display the musical and lyrical excellence and intentionality of Rend Collective." Tony Cummings, rating the album a six out of ten for Cross Rhythms, writes, "it's just a shame that several of the tracks here sound so disappointingly generic."

Christopher Smith, awarding the album three and a half stars for Jesus Freak Hideout, writes, "As Family We Go may not be their best effort, but it is still a valiant one." Rating the album three and a half stars by Jesus Freak Hideout, Ryan Barbee states, "while the album has all of the makings of an excellent release, it feels like a step in an odd direction." Awarding the album four stars at Jesus Freak Hideout, Scott Fryberger says, "This is a good album to add to your already existing Rend Collective collection--as well as a good remedy for the soul in need of some encouragement." Mark Rice, indicating in a three and a half star review from Jesus Freak Hideout, recognizes, "But much of this album is Rend Collective at the very pinnacle of their game, so one can forgive the rather uneven listen to an extent."

Awarding the album four and a half stars from 365 Days of Inspiring Media, Joshua Andre says, "it's clear that Rend Collective bring so much lyrical and musical creativity throughout these 16 tracks, injecting fun, joy and life into worship." Jono Davies, giving the album five stars at Louder Than the Music, states, "Rend have again produced an album that will be loved by their ever growing fan base." Signaling in a 4.7 out of five review for Christian Music Review, Kelly Meade writes, "With songs ranging from full-on, joyful praise to the more peaceful, reflective ballads, As Family We Go has something for everyone, keeping the focus on God at the center of it all." Rebekah Joy, rating the album a seven out of ten from Jesus Wired, says, "As Family We Go is an incredible album that deserves lots of celebration."

== Accolades ==
This album was No. 14, on the Worship Leader's Top 20 Albums of 2015 list.

== Track listing ==
Standard edition
No.	Title	Length
1.	"Celebrate"	3:02
2.	"Free as a Bird"	3:23
3.	"You Will Never Run"	3:15
4.	"Every Giant Will Fall"	3:45
5.	"One and Only"	4:38
6.	"Joy of the Lord"	3:46
7.	"Never Walk Alone"	4:58
8.	"Your Royal Blood"	4:51
9.	"Just a Glimpse"	4:56
10.	"Coming Home"	2:36
11.	"The Artist"	4:02
Total length:		43:12

Deluxe edition
No.	Title	Length
12.	"Ireland's Call"	3:10
13.	"You Will Never Run (Neon Feather Remix)"	3:19
14.	"One and Only (Urban Rescue Remix)"	4:28
15.	"Never Weigh Me Down"	4:12
16.	"Every Giant Will Fall (Ukulele Version)"	4:10
Total length:		62:31

== Charts ==
Chart (2015)	Peak position
Australian Albums (ARIA)	71
Canadian Albums (Billboard)	21
Swiss Albums (Schweizer Hitparade)	65
UK Albums (OCC)	19
UK Christian & Gospel Albums (OCC)	1
US Billboard 200	33
US Top Christian Albums (Billboard)	1
US Digital Albums (Billboard)	10
