= Marmozets =

English rock band

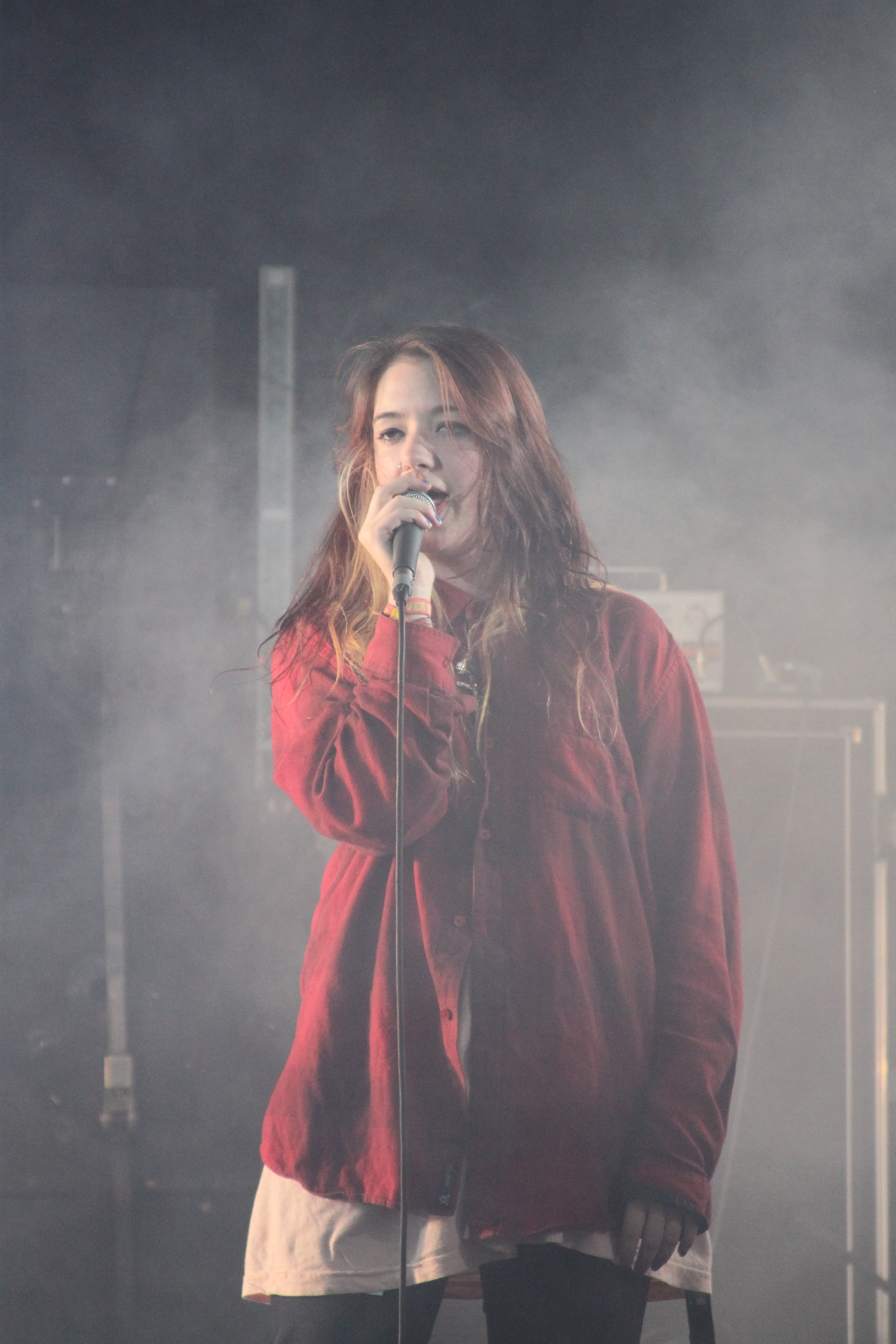
- Becca Bottomley performing with Marmozets in 2011

Background information
- Origin: Bingley, West Yorkshire, England
- Genres: Math rock; post-hardcore; alternative rock; punk rock; mathcore
- Years active: 2007–present
- Labels: Roadrunner; Nettwerk
- Members: Becca Bottomley; Jack Bottomley; Josh MacIntyre
- Past members: Will Bottomley; Joe Doherty; Sam MacIntyre
- Website: marmozets.band

Marmozets are an English rock band from Bingley, West Yorkshire. Formed in 2007, the band consists of Rebecca "Becca" Bottomley (lead vocals), Jack Bottomley (guitar), and Josh Macintyre (drums). Marmozets signed to Roadrunner Records in October 2013 and released their debut album on 29 September 2014. Their second album, Knowing What You Know Now, came out on 26 January 2018. Following an extended hiatus, the band announced their third album, Co.War.Dice, which was released on 22 May 2026.

== Biography ==
=== Early years, The Weird and Wonderful Marmozets (2007–2016) ===
The two sets of siblings formed the band while at school and have been playing live since 2007, gathering widespread acclaim for their chaotic live shows despite an average age of just 15. The band were originally called The Marmozets, and under this name they released one EP titled Out of My Control in 2009. They soon after altered their name to just Marmozets.

They have shared stages with the likes of Young Guns, Funeral For a Friend, Gallows, Hyro Da Hero, The Used, Four Year Strong and Muse and have appeared at Glastonbury Festival, Download Festival, Reading and Leeds, Rock Werchter, Slam Dunk Festival, 2000trees and Y Not Festival.

They released their EP, Passive Aggressive in 2011 and followed that with Vexed in 2012. Gallows' record label Venn Records released Marmozets' first single "Good Days" in 2012. In 2013 the band self-released their second single, "Born Young and Free", before the band signed to Roadrunner Records and released "Move Shake Hide". Both singles received high praise from BBC Radio 1 DJs Zane Lowe, Daniel P Carter and Huw Stephens. The band released the single "Why Do You Hate Me?" on 17 March 2014.

The band was nominated for Best British Newcomer at the 2013 Kerrang! Awards and were voted Best New UK Band by Big Cheese magazine. Along with the singles released in the run up to the album, the band had also performed a few other unreleased tracks live that would feature on their debut album, including "Is It Horrible", "Cover Up" and "Hit the Wave". Marmozets embarked on their first headline UK tour in September 2013.

They released their debut album The Weird and Wonderful Marmozets on 29 September 2014. It received critical acclaim, later winning the 2015 Kerrang! Award for Best Album.

In March 2015, it was announced that Marmozets would be supporting Muse on their 2015 UK Psycho Tour.

=== Knowing What You Know Now and hiatus (2017–2024) ===
Work on the band's second album was delayed when Becca McIntyre was hospitalised after being diagnosed with hypermobility syndrome. McIntyre had to endure several operations and months of recovery before returning to the band.

In January 2017, Sam Macintyre announced via Twitter that the band had completed their second album. The first single from the album, "Play", was released in August 2017 and reached the top of the Kerrang! Rock Chart. The song was also used as one of the official themes of the NXT Takeover special, NXT TakeOver: WarGames.

On 10 October 2017, the band released a second single from the album, "Habits", which debuted on BBC Radio 1 prior to its official digital release. The band also announced details of their new album, titled Knowing What You Know Now, and made it available to pre-order. On 11 December 2017, the band released the third single from their new album, "Major System Error". The album was released on 26 January 2018.

Following the end of the touring cycle for Knowing What You Know Now, the band entered a hiatus. In 2019, bandmates Becca Macintyre and Jack Bottomley welcomed their first child, and announced their marriage in June 2022.

=== Co.War.Dice (2024–present) ===
In July 2024, Marmozets announced via Instagram that they had signed a record deal with The Nettwerk Music Group and would "see you all soon". On 9 July 2025, the band revealed via their Instagram page that they had completed work on their third album. On 5 November 2025, the band released "A Kiss from a Mother" – the first single from their third album – and announced their first live shows since 2018, which began in December. They also confirmed that bassist Will Bottomley had amicably left the band to pursue other musical endeavours. Two more singles, "You Want the Truth" and "New York", followed before the band announced that their third album – Co.War.Dice. – would be released on 22 May 2026.

On July 3, 2026 they released a standalone single, "Closer to You." Later the same month, the band announced on Instagram that bassist Sam Macintyre had left the band - leaving the band as a three piece.

== Musical style ==
Critics have categorised Mamozets' music as math rock, post-hardcore, alternative rock, punk rock and mathcore.

They have cited influences including Big Black, the Dillinger Escape Plan, the Locust, the Chariot, Architects, the Fall of Troy, Underoath, Brace War, Trash Talk, Ceremony, S Club 7, Queens of the Stone Age, Jack White, Foo Fighters, Nirvana, At the Drive-In, the Mars Volta, Sufjan Stevens, Job for a Cowboy, José González, Sigur Rós and This Will Destroy You. In their 2011 press statement, they described their own sound as "somewhere in between Be Your Own Pet, Blakfish and the Fall of Troy".

Marmozets have been cited as an influence by Heriot and Fangclub.

== Members ==
=== Current line-up ===
- Rebecca "Becca" Bottomley – lead vocals
- Jack Bottomley – guitar
- Josh Macintyre – drums, vocals

=== Previous members ===
- Joe Doherty – guitar
- Will Bottomley – bass, vocals
- Sam Macintyre – guitar, bass, vocals

== Discography ==
Marmozets discography
- Studio albums: 3
- EPs: 4
- Singles: 14
- Music videos: 12

=== Studio albums ===
List of studio albums, with selected chart positions
Year	Details	Peak chart positions
Year	Details	UK
2014	The Weird and Wonderful Marmozets: Released: 29 September 2014; Label: Roadrunner	25
2018	Knowing What You Know Now: Released: 26 January 2018; Label: Roadrunner	23
2026	Co.War.Dice.: Released: 22 May 2026; Label: Nettwerk	87

=== EPs ===
List of EPs
Year	Details
2009	Out of My Control: Released: 19 August 2009; Label: n/a
2011	Passive Aggressive: Released: 1 November 2011; Label: n/a
2012	Vexed: Released: 2 June 2012; Label: n/a
2014	Marmozets: Released: 4 June 2014; Label: Roadrunner

=== Singles ===
List of singles
Year	Details
2012	"Good Days": Released: 5 November 2012; Label: Venn
2013	"Born Young and Free": Released: 10 May 2013; Label: n/a
2013	"Move Shake Hide": Released: 14 October 2013; Label: Roadrunner
2014	"Why Do You Hate Me?": Released: 17 March 2014; Label: Roadrunner
2014	"Captivate You": Released: 4 June 2014; Label: Roadrunner
2017	"Play": Released: 21 August 2017; Label: Roadrunner
2017	"Habits": Released: 11 October 2017; Label: Roadrunner
2017	"Major System Error": Released: 11 December 2017; Label: Roadrunner
2025	"A Kiss from a Mother": Released: 6 November 2025
2025	"You Want the Truth": Released: 19 December 2025
2026	"New York": Released: 29 January 2026
2026	"Running with the Sun in Your Eyes": Released: 6 March 2026
2026	"Cut Back": Released: 10 April 2026
2026	"Closer To You": Released: 3 July 2026
