= Organic Family Hymnal =

Studio album by Rend Collective
- Released: 28 September 2010
- Length: 61:02
- Producer: Gareth Gilkeson

Rend Collective chronology
Organic Family Hymnal (2010)	Homemade Worship by Handmade People (2012)

Organic Family Hymnal is the first studio album by Rend Collective which was released on 28 September 2010.

== Background ==
Organic Family Hymnal is the first studio album by the band Rend Collective and was released on 28 September 2010. Lead singer, Gareth Gilkeson, explained the term organic means the music "came from a very deep place with God."

== Critical reception ==
Professional ratings
Review scores
Source	Rating
AllMusic	4/5 stars
Jesus freak hideout	4/5 stars

AllMusic stated that the first 30 seconds of the first track "Come on My Soul" was "the opposite of corporate worship". A review in Cross Rhythms said that the most powerful song on the album was "You Bled".

== Track listing ==
No.	Title	Length
1.	"Come on My Soul"	2:22
2.	"Faithful"	4:58
3.	"Movements"	3:16
4.	"You Bled"	4:51
5.	"Broken Bread"	5:04
6.	"Exalt"	5:38
7.	"God Is Near"	5:28
8.	"Above Everything Else"	6;36
9.	"Too Much"	4:21
10.	"You Are Love"	3:27
11.	"Thine Be the Glory"	4:28
12.	"Love Divine"	6:34
13.	"Find Your Kindness"	4:09
Total length:		61:02

== Charts ==
Chart (2010)	Peak position
US Top Christian Albums	47
