= Bob Vylan =

English punk rap duo

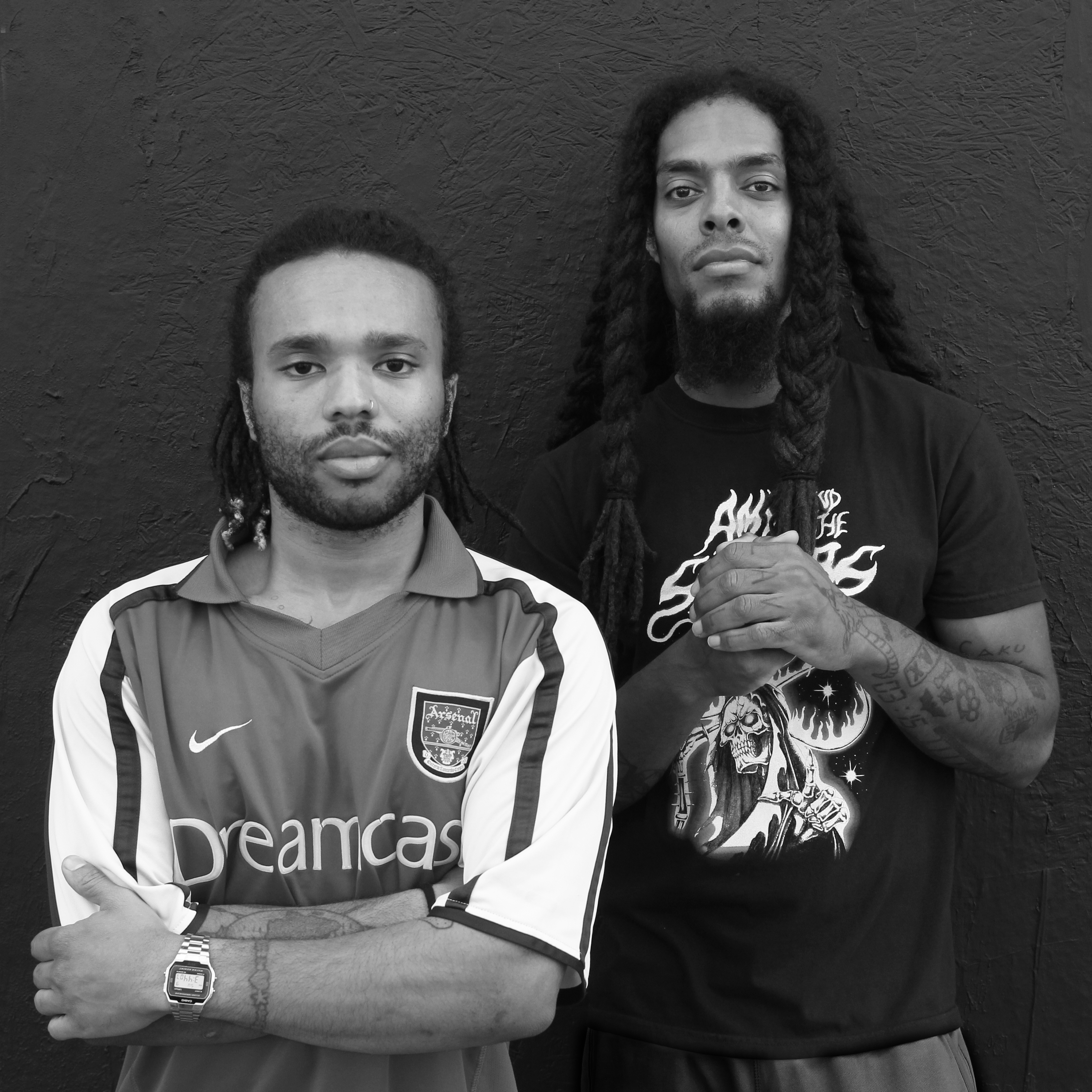
- Bobbie Vylan and Bobby Vylan in Los Angeles, 2022

Background information
- Also known as: The Bobs
- Origin: Ipswich, England
- Genres: Punk rap; rap rock; alternative rock
- Years active: 2017–present
- Labels: Ghost Theatre; Venn
- Members: Bobby Vylan; Bobbie Vylan
- Website: bobvylan.com

Bob Vylan (pronounced "villain") are an English punk rap duo based in London. Their work merges elements of punk rock, hip hop, grime, and hardcore, and features criticisms of the British establishment, inequality, racism, sexism, and homophobia. The band consists of vocalist Bobby Vylan on guitar, and Bobbie Vylan on drums, which are stage names the duo use to maintain privacy in what they describe as a surveillance state. The group has released four albums, their self-released 2019 debut EP Dread, We Live Here in 2020, Bob Vylan Presents the Price of Life in 2022, and Humble as the Sun in 2024. They have received favorable reviews from NME and The Guardian, among others.

The duo are outspoken in their opposition to Israeli occupation of the Palestinian territories, Israel's actions in the Gaza war and the Gaza genocide. Their leading the crowd in a chant of "death, death to the IDF" during their performance at Glastonbury Festival 2025 was condemned by a variety of sources and resulted in the cancellation of some shows, while their visas for an upcoming tour in the United States were revoked. Following the controversy, their most recent album, Humble as the Sun, (2024) topped the UK Hip Hop and R&B Album Chart and reached number 8 on the UK Independent Albums Chart. They repeated the chant at a September 2025 concert in Amsterdam, along with insults towards Charlie Kirk, who had been assassinated days prior.

== History ==
The band was formed in 2017 by singer–guitarist Bobby (Bobby ending in y)Vylan (real name Pascal Robinson-Foster) and drummer Bobbie (Bobby ending in ie)Vylan (real name Wade Laurence George) in Ipswich. The band's name is a pun on Bob Dylan and "villain". Their first concert followed just two weeks later. Bobby took part in slam poetry as a teenager under the name Nee Hi, receiving coverage from the BBC in the mid-2000s.

In its first year, Bob Vylan released four singles and two EPs, Dread and Vylan, via the band's own label, Ghost Theatre. Following the DIY principle, the musicians personally delivered their albums to various record stores and booked their own shows.

The band released their debut album on 5 June 2020, We Live Here, which was self-released after the band said they were told that it was "too extreme" by the music industry. Bob Vylan then toured supporting the Offspring and Biffy Clyro and performed at the Reading and Leeds Festivals in 2021. The band released its second studio album on 22 April 2022, Bob Vylan Presents the Price of Life, which entered the UK Albums Chart at number 18. The band released two singles from their third studio album, Humble as the Sun on 27 October 2023. The album was released on 5 April 2024.

A NME review of We Live Here (2020), noted the band's frustration with systemic injustices in the UK, including police brutality and "fear-mongering in the media". Their third album, 'The Price of Life' (2022), became their most successful, debuting at number 18 on the UK Albums Chart. Their subsequent album, Humble as the Sun (2024) received a favorable reviews in Spill magazine and Everything is Noise. NME said the album was "electrifying, experimental and empowering".

Bob Vylan sued the publishers of the Manchester Evening News after it published a story in October 2025 falsely alleging that a guided stretching and meditation routine performed by Vylan contained Nazi salutes. Robinson was awarded £16,000 in damages and an apology from the publisher.

== Musical style ==
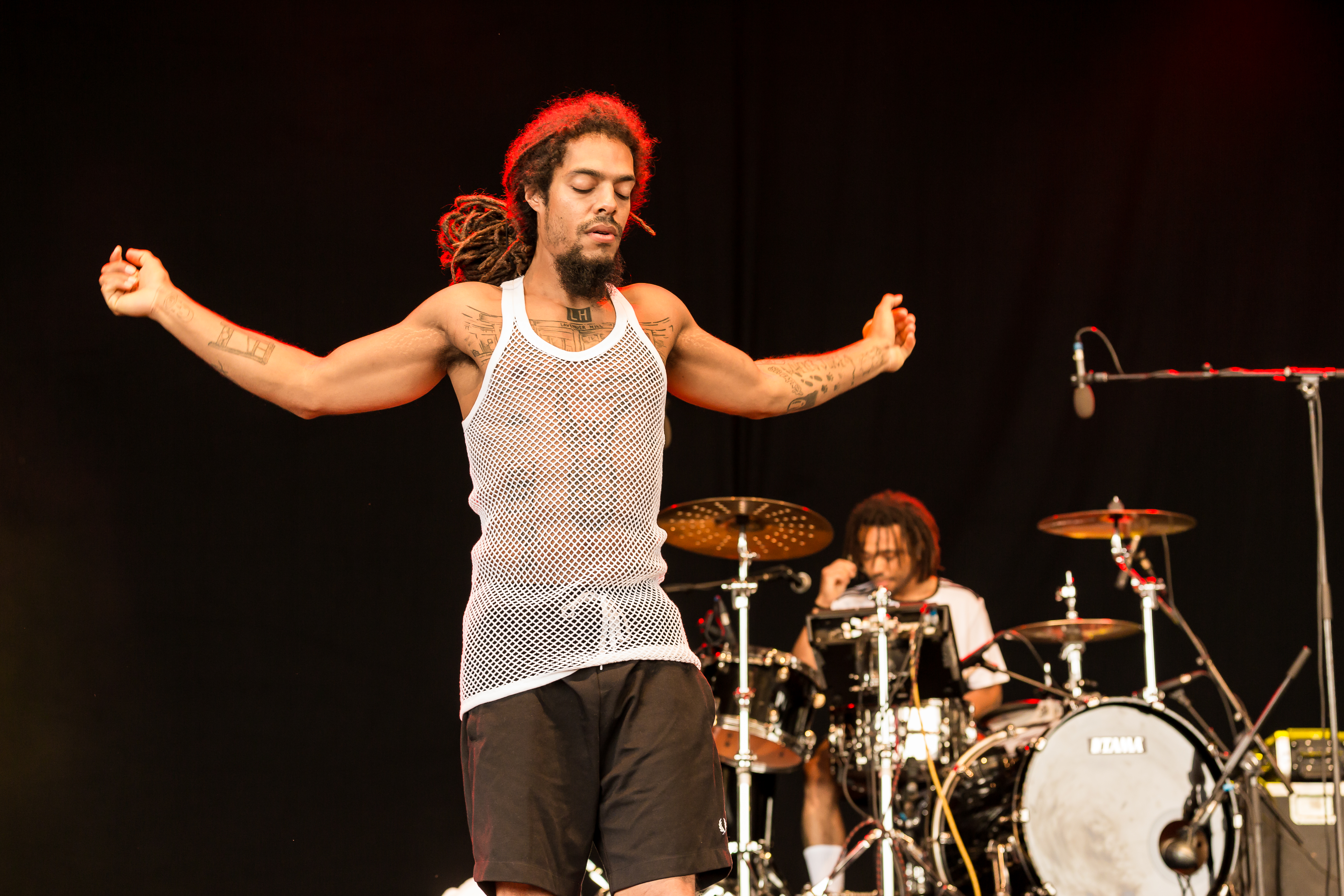
Bob Vylan at Full Force 2022 in Ferropolis, Germany.

Bob Vylan combines grime rap with punk rock. Singer Bobby grew up listening to rap, grime, punk and indie rock. After learning the guitar, he wanted to incorporate all of his influences into his music. Their music is also influenced by Jamaican genres as a tribute to Bobby's Jamaican heritage; songs "Wicked and Bad" and "Health Is Wealth" on their album The Price of Life contain elements of dancehall and reggae. Their music also contains elements of spoken-word poetry, like "Intro" on We Live Here and "Interlude" on The Price of Life.

The Sex Pistols' Johnny Rotten and Akala are cited as two of their musical influences. Rappers Dizzee Rascal, Stormzy, and Skepta are cited as influences by Bobby in particular. Despite their stage name, the pair do not cite Bob Dylan as a musical influence. In a 2024 interview with DIY, lead singer Bobby attributed a lot of his lyrical influence to the late Whitney Houston, with drummer Bobbie adding "Whitney was everything to me when I was a kid".

Far Out describes Bob Vylan as a London duo blending punk, grime, and hip-hop into a "distinctive" and "scintillating" sound, pairing "righteously furious" energy with sharp, often humorous lyricism led by frontman Bobby Vylan.

The American magazine Alternative Press recommended Bob Vylan for fans of Idles, Fever 333 and Turnstile. Ian Winwood from UK magazine Kerrang! called Bob Vylan the most exciting and important punk band in the United Kingdom in 2022.

=== Musical themes ===
Common ideas found in the lyrics include social and political issues such as racism, police violence, economic inequality, access to healthy food, gentrification, mental health, fatherhood, late-stage capitalism, homophobia, toxic masculinity, Britain's political hypocrisy, and the pharmaceutical industry. The theme of the struggles of being a black man in Europe are recurrent in every album, and include the mental health struggles of black men, institutional racism that contributes to poverty in black communities, the threat of police, and the struggles of being a black parent in a world that threatens your children.

Bobby described the duo as "violent punks" at the Glastonbury Festival in 2025, stating a need to get their "message across with violence", when they feel that is "the only language some people speak".

Some of Bob Vylan's messages were considered too extreme by the contemporary music industry. Their lyrics and on-stage talk often contain explicitly violent language, and an article in Recherches anglaises et nord-américaines described them as treading "the fine line between insight and incitement". One song, for example, contains the lyric "kill the fucking queen"; another says "burn Britannia, kill the queen". The song titled "Lynch Your Leaders" has the line "come and see the hanging" with its artwork depicting an image of Queen Elizabeth II and a noose. In a music festival in Blackpool in 2023, Bobby said about the police: "The only good pig is a dead pig".

== Political activism ==
The band's lyrics consistently address social and political issues, including racism and police violence, particularly those faced by Black men in Europe. In an interview with Rocksound, Bobby discussed how their music references economic hardship, police interaction, and racism in the United Kingdom. In an interview with the Guardian, Bobby Vylan explained that he uses his music to promote a "positive self-image". He recites affirmations with his daughter about his Black identity.

=== Palestine ===
Bob Vylan have been outspoken in their support for Palestine, a stance that has been central to their public identity. In a 2024 interview with The Guardian, frontman Bobby Vylan revealed that his support for Palestine is long-standing, stating that he attended his first pro-Palestine protest at the age of 15. They criticised Idles and Sleaford Mods at a November 2023 show in Dublin, alleging that both groups called themselves left-wing but would not speak up for Palestinians.

The duo were one of several acts at Glastonbury Festival 2025 to make statements in support of Palestine and against Israel during their sets, alongside the Irish acts CMAT, Inhaler and Kneecap. The duo performed in front of a screen that displayed "Free Palestine: United Nations have called it a genocide. The BBC calls it a 'conflict'."

They gave a speech in Barcelona on 1 September 2025, praising the participants of the Global Sumud Flotilla, which aims to break the siege on Gaza, as "brave individuals" acting where governments had failed.

== Achievements ==
Bob Vylan has received significant recognition for their work, particularly for their 2022 album, Bob Vylan Presents the Price of Life. The album's impact was marked by significant chart success, debuting at number 18 on the UK Albums Chart and simultaneously topping the Official Vinyl Albums Chart, making them the first independent band to land a self-released album in the Top 20. This achievement was complemented by major award wins, including Best Album at the Kerrang! Awards and the inaugural Best Alternative Music Act at the MOBO Awards that same year, with a subsequent nomination in the same MOBO category in 2025. The album was met with critical acclaim and the band's politically charged lyrics and fusion of genres have been praised by publications such as Clash, The Guardian, and NME.

Their follow-up album, Humble as the Sun (2024), continued this trajectory of success. It reached number one on the UK Official Hip-Hop and R&B Albums Chart and re-entered the UK Independent Albums Chart in 2025. The album was met with critical acclaim, with NME describing it as "electrifying ... and empowering". Kerrang! magazine describes the duo as "the most exciting and important punk band in the United Kingdom."

Bob Vylan has performed at a number of major music festivals and on notable tours. They have appeared at Reading and Leeds Festivals, Coachella and Glastonbury. They embarked on several headline tours and have toured across the UK on sold-out shows, including a sold-out performance at the Electric Ballroom in London in December 2022. The band has also been a featured act at international festivals like Riot Fest in the US and Pukkelpop in Belgium.

== Controversies ==
=== "Death to the IDF" chants ===
Between songs during their set at the 2025 Glastonbury Festival, Bobby called out to the crowd: "Alright, but have you heard this one, though? Death, death to the IDF!" The chant led to widespread criticism and condemnation. Glastonbury Festival co-organiser Emily Eavis said she was "appalled" by the comments, which contradicted the festival's ethos of "hope, unity, peace and love". A BBC spokesperson apologised for the "deeply offensive" content, removed it from streaming on BBC iPlayer and that they "should have pulled [it] during the performance". BBC staff members called for resignations over the broadcast. Culture Secretary Lisa Nandy spoke to BBC Director-General Tim Davie to learn "what due diligence" the BBC carried out prior to broadcasting the act, given they had declined to broadcast Kneecap's set live amid similar controversy.

Prime Minister Keir Starmer described the performance as "appalling hate speech". Conservative leader Kemi Badenoch called the scene "grotesque", writing that "glorifying violence against Jews isn't edgy." The Israeli embassy stated that the chants were "inflammatory and hateful rhetoric" and glorified violence. Labour health secretary Wes Streeting described the chant as "appalling", and said the "irony of that music festival is that Israelis were taken from a music festival, killed, raped and in some cases are still being held captive". Chief Rabbi Sir Ephraim Mirvis condemned the broadcast as "a national shame" and an example of "vile Jew hatred." Avon and Somerset Police opened a criminal investigation into the band over the chant. The US Department of State revoked the duo's entry visas ahead of a planned autumn tour. United Talent Agency dropped the group as a client after the incident. They were also removed from the lineups of Radar Festival in Manchester and Kave Fest.

In a statement, the band said they believed they were being "targeted for speaking up" about the Gaza war. Bobbie criticized the reactions in a statement: "They want to control this country's narrative to frame genocide as Israel defending itself". The band also released a statement, writing, "We are not for the death of Jews, Arabs or any other race or group of people. We are for the dismantling of a violent military machine.... A machine that has destroyed much of Gaza." The bands Massive Attack, Fontaines D.C., and Amyl and the Sniffers spoke in support of Bob Vylan. Musician Grandson said, "As a Jewish artist, I am deeply offended by the conflation of criticism against a military force known for their indiscriminate violence with antisemitism." Journalist Archie Bland wrote that the actions of the Israeli military were the "obvious" focus of the chant, and criticized the amount of coverage it received. Blur and Gorillaz frontman Damon Albarn criticised Bob Vylan's chants: "It was one of the most spectacular misfires I’ve seen in my life. Especially when he started to goose-step in tennis gear. I mean I’ve had my moments — not quite as catastrophic as that but you do get carried away."

After the festival, a video surfaced showing Bobby saying to the crowd at Alexandra Palace in London on 28 May 2025: "Death to every single IDF soldier out there as an agent of terror for Israel. Death to the IDF". The band's 2024 album Humble As The Sun surged back up the music charts, reaching the top of the UK Hip Hop and R&B albums chart as well as number 7 on the Official Album Downloads Chart and number 8 on the Official Independent Albums Chart. At their first UK concert after the festival, at London's 100 Club, the crowd started to chant "Death to the IDF". Bobby urged them to stop, saying "you'll get me in trouble", and instead led a chant of "Free Palestine".

The Community Security Trust, a UK charity that monitors antisemitism, reported that the day after the band's performance, saw the highest daily number of antisemitic incidents recorded in the UK during the first half of the year. The organisation described the chants as "utterly chilling", and noted how rhetoric against Israel can inflame antisemitic sentiment. Home Secretary Yvette Cooper acknowledged the report's findings and affirmed the "government's commitment to root out anti-Semitism".

The band led another "Death to the IDF" chant during a performance in Amsterdam on 13 September 2025. Bobby Vylan also told the audience "Fuck the fascists, fuck the Zionists. Go find them in the streets." The Dutch Public Prosecution Service announced an investigation into the incident, which was condemned by multiple Dutch MPs across the political spectrum. A court in Nijmegen later ruled that a scheduled Monday concert could proceed, rejecting a local safety authority's attempt to ban it on the grounds that the band's lyrics were "too offensive." The judge found no evidence that the performance would lead to immediate public disorder.

Bobby Vylan was featured on Louis Theroux's podcast in October 2025, during an interview which Danny Cohen described as "softball". Bobby stated that he did not regret leading chants of "death to the IDF" and would "do it again tomorrow." He described the backlash as "minimal compared to what people in Palestine are going through". British Airways withdrew its advertising from the podcast in response.

Avon and Somerset Police ended their investigation into the band in December 2025, stating that chants made at Glastonbury, including "death to the IDF", did "not meet the criminal threshold" for prosecution. The band responded that they hoped "this news inspires others in the UK and around the world to speak up, and continue speaking up, in support of the Palestinian people, without fear".

The group issued defamation proceedings against RTÉ in December 2025 and against the BBC in July 2026. Robinson-Foster was detained at the Berlin airport in June 2026, and deported to the United Kingdom over his comments.

=== Charlie Kirk ===
At an Amsterdam concert, Bobby referred to American conservative activist and podcaster Charlie Kirk as a "piece of shit", days after Kirk's assassination. He also mockingly dedicated the band's song "Chat Shit - Get Banged" to Kirk, accompanying the lyrics with a gesture mimicking a gunshot. A subsequent Vylan concert in Tilburg was cancelled by the venue, which said that the statements "cross[ed] a line for us", citing the "trivialisation of political murder" and call to "go look for people in the streets." Bobby later denied media reports that he celebrated Kirk's death, stating that his remarks were misrepresented, saying "I did call him a piece of shit, that much is true. But at no point was his death celebrated." Charges against the group were dismissed.

== Discography ==
=== Studio albums ===
Title	Details	Peak chart positions
Title	Details	UK
We Live Here	Released: 27 March 2020; Label: Venn	—
Bob Vylan Presents the Price of Life	Released: 22 April 2022; Label: Ghost Theatre	18
Humble as the Sun	Released: 5 April 2024; Label: Ghost Theatre	22

=== Extended plays ===
Title	Details
Dread	Released: 1 March 2019; Label: Ghost Theatre

== Awards ==
Award nominations for Work
Year	Category	Institution or publication	Result	Notes	Ref.
2022	Best Alternative Music Act	MOBO Awards	Won	This was the first year that the MOBO Awards had Best Alternative Music Act as a category	
2022	Best Album	Kerrang! Awards	Won	For the album Bob Vylan Presents the Price of Life	
