= Counting Every Blessing =

Single by Rend Collective

from the album Good News
- Released: January 5, 2018
- Recorded: 2017
- Genre: Christian experimental; folk rock; worship
- Length: 5:02
- Label: Kingsway, Integrity, Capitol CMG
- Songwriter(s): Gareth Gilkeson; Chris Llewellyn; Ali Gilkeson; Patrick Thompson; Stephen Mitchell
- Producer(s): Rend Collective

Rend Collective singles chronology
"Rescuer (Good News)" (2017)	"Counting Every Blessing" (2018)	"Your Name Is Power" (2019)

Music video
- "Counting Every Blessing" on YouTube

"Counting Every Blessing" is a song performed by Northern Irish Christian experimental, folk rock, worship band Rend Collective. The song was released as the second single from their 2018 album Good News on January 5, 2018. The song peaked at No. 8 on the US Hot Christian Songs chart, becoming their first top-ten single from that chart. It lasted 31 weeks on the overall chart, becoming their longest charting song in their career. The song is played in an A major key, and 90 beats per minute.

== Background ==
"Counting Every Blessing" was released on January 5, 2018, as the second single from their eighth studio album Good News. The band explained the meaning of the song in an interview with Hallels: "Have you ever struggled with depression or the thought that God's plan wasn't good enough? That's where the story behind our song Counting Every Blessing comes from. This song came from out of a season of depression, because we needed to be reminded of the goodness and faithfulness of God. 'Counting every blessing' isn't a glib Christian phrase for us, but a battle cry, an attitude to carry us through the darkest of nights. We hope whatever season you find yourself in today that this song would be an encouragement for you too."

== Music video ==
A music video for the single "Counting Every Blessing" was released on February 2, 2018.

== Track listing ==
- Digital download
1. "Counting Every Blessing" – 5:02
- Digital download (Ukulele Session)
1. "Counting Every Blessing" – 3:55

== Charts ==
=== Weekly charts ===
Chart (2018)	Peak position
US Christian AC (Billboard)	6
US Christian Airplay (Billboard)	4
US Christian Songs (Billboard)	8
US Christian AC Indicator (Billboard)	3

=== Year-end charts ===
Chart (2018)	Peak position
US Christian AC (Billboard)	19
US Christian Airplay (Billboard)	18
US Christian CHR (Billboard)	32
US Christian Songs (Billboard)	20
US Weekend Top 20	18
US Weekend 22	13
