= Jerub =

English singer-songwriter (born 1998)

- Born: Gideon Ogheneochuko Akpovi; 2 August 1998 (age 28); Nigeria
- Occupations: Singer; songwriter; programmer
- Years active: 2019–present
- Musical career
- Genres: Pop; soul
- Instruments: Vocals; guitar; piano
- Labels: Jerub Music; Elevate Music Ltd.; Absolute Label Services
- Website: jerubmusic.com

Gideon Ogheneochuko Akpovi (born 2 August 1998), known professionally as Jerub, (Note: Stylised in all caps) is an English pop and soul singer and songwriter from Nottingham, signed to Elevate Music Ltd. and Absolute Label Services. He garnered a following from local audiences from live performances early on in his career, and in 2023 experienced breakout success as a performer at several major music festivals. As a solo musician, he has released three extended plays, Feel It (2021), Finding My Feet (2023), and Carry the Load (2024), and one mixtape, The Wonder Years (2025).

== Life and career ==
=== Early career beginnings and Feel It (1998–2022) ===
Jerub was born in Nigeria, and moved to Nottingham when he was 10 years old. He learned to sing in a choir at age 11, inspired by the actions of his brother, and learned to play the guitar at age 15. He also played in a band with his brother and a friend. As a 19 year old he first experienced commercial success when a song of his was played on BBC Radio 1. In 2021 Jerub appeared as a finalist on Live Lounge's Introducing Talent competition, and later that year released his debut extended play, Feel It, both of which helped him gain a following from Nottingham residents. Jerub also implemented the use of social media and live performances to gain traction early in his career.

=== Finding My Feet, Carry the Load, and The Wonder Years (2022–present) ===
Jerub signed with Elevate Music in 2022, and in 2023 found major mainstream recognition as a performer at the concert for the Coronation of Charles III and Camilla. He subsequently appeared at several more major concerts and festivals, including The Great Escape, Latitude Festival, Live at Leeds, and Dot to Dot Festival. Later that year toured Europe alongside JP Cooper.

On 10 February 2023, Jerub released the single "Cold", with which he announced the upcoming release of his second extended play, Finding My Feet. The second single from the extended play, "Scared to Be Myself", was released on 31 March. The full extended play was released on 26 May, and album track "There Till the End" found success commercially when BBC Radio 1 named it "Track of the Week". With the promotion it received from BBC, "There Till the End" entered the Official Charts Company's UK Singles Downloads Chart and UK Singles Sales Chart at numbers 76 and 82, respectively, becoming Jerub's first chart entry.

In September 2023, it was announced that Jerub had signed a worldwide publishing deal with BDi Music. Alongside the announcement, he released "You and I", which appeared as the lead single to his third extended play, Carry the Load. Jerub's first mixtape, The Wonder Years, was released on 7 November 2025, following the release of singles "Deeper", "Let It Go", and "Kumbaya"; the lattermost of which becoming a commercial success, peaking at numbers 50 and 53 on the UK Singles Downloads Chart and UK Singles Sales Chart respectively, while on the UK Christian & Gospel Singles Chart it led for a cumulative ten weeks.

== Musical style ==
Jerub's musical style primarily demonstrates the genres of pop and soul, but also contains elements of gospel, indie, pop-punk, and alternative rock. Jerub has named some major influences to be Kirk Franklin, Otis Redding, Ed Sheeran, and Jon Bellion, and believes his Nigerian upbringing has also influenced his style. Jerub has personally described his music as "intense, raw emotion" containing "powerful vocals, anthem choruses, and honest lyrics". Arlo Parks praised his "voice that draws you in".

== Discography ==
=== Mixtapes ===
Title	Details
The Wonder Years	Released: 7 November 2025; Label: Elevate Music Ltd, Absolute Label Services; Formats: Digital download, streaming

=== Extended plays ===
Title	Details
Feel It	Released: 2 December 2021; Label: Jerub Music; Formats: Digital download, streaming
Finding My Feet	Released: 26 May 2023; Label: Elevate; Formats: Digital download, streaming
Carry the Load	Released: 5 July 2024; Label: Elevate; Formats: Digital download, streaming

=== Singles ===
Title	Year	Peak chart positions			Album
Title	Year	UK C&G	UK Down.	UK Sales	Album
"Paint Me in Gold"	2019	—	—	—	Non-album singles
"Hold On"	2019	—	—	—	Non-album singles
"That Place"	2020	—	—	—	Non-album singles
"Feel It"	2021	—	—	—	Feel It (EP)
"No Good Alone"	2021	—	—	—	Feel It (EP)
"Trade It All"	2021	—	—	—	Feel It (EP)
"Cold"	2023	—	—	—	Finding My Feet (EP)
"Scared to Be Myself"	2023	—	—	—	Finding My Feet (EP)
"I Came Here for Love"	2023	—	—	—	Non-album single
"You and I"	2023	—	—	—	Carry the Load (EP)
"What If" (original or with Aaron Taylor)	2024	—	—	—	Non-album single
"Gonna Be Okay"	2024	—	—	—	Carry the Load (EP)
"Deeper"	2025	—	—	—	The Wonder Years
"Let It Go"	2025	—	—	—	The Wonder Years
"Kumbaya"	2025	1	50	53	The Wonder Years
"Stay"	2026	—	—	—	Non-album singles
"Forever Right Now"	2026	—	—	—	Non-album singles
"Alone Tonight" (with Toby Gad)	2026	—	—	—	Non-album singles
"—" denotes a recording that did not chart or was not released in that territory.

=== Other charted songs ===
Title	Year	Peak chart positions		Album
Title	Year	UK Down.	UK Sales	Album
"There Till the End"	2023	76	82	Finding My Feet (EP)

== Tours ==
=== As headlining act ===
- The Wonder Years Tour (2025)

=== As featured act ===
- Untitled European tour (with JP Cooper, 2023)
- Untitled Australian tour (with Victor Ray, 2025)
