= List of rare songs recorded by Therapy? =

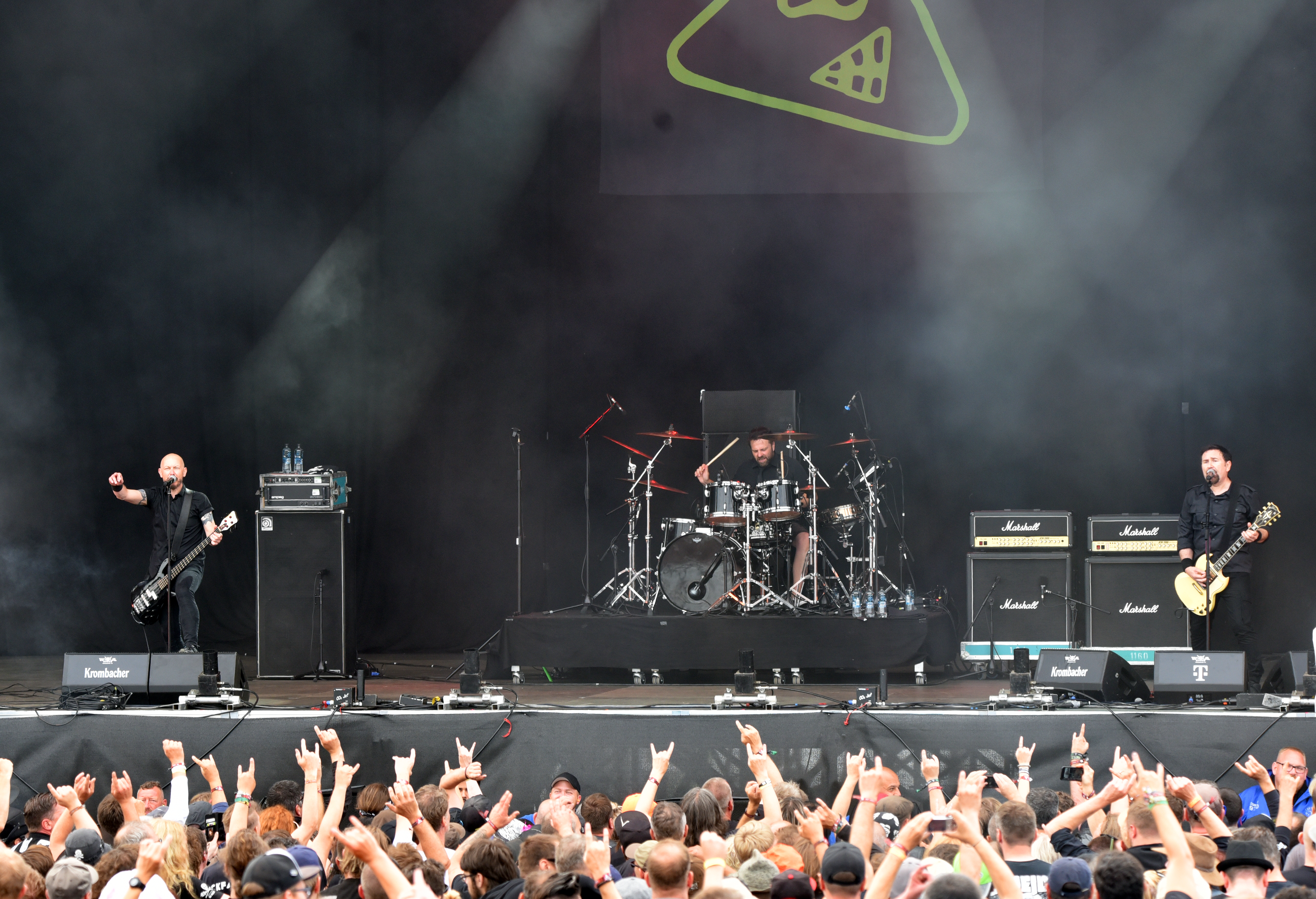
Therapy? at Wacken Open Air 2022

This is a list of songs recorded by Northern Irish rock band Therapy?

== Rare released songs ==
The following is a table of rare released songs meeting the following criteria:

- Songs on any official record release (record company or otherwise), and any collaborations by Therapy? with other artists, are included here, except for songs on the official 16 albums (Baby Teeth to Hard Cold Fire), the 2 compilation albums (So Much for the Ten Year Plan and Music Through a Cheap Transistor), the 3 live albums (We're Here to the End, Communion: Live at the Union Chapel and Greatest Hits (The Abbey Road Session)), or The Gemil Box.
- Songs provided on the official website for free download are not included here.
- Songs only released on bootlegs are not included here.
- The columns Title, Released, Where and Notes list each song title, the year the song was released, on which release it can be found and any notes accompanying the song.

Title	Released	Where	Notes
Innocent X (Remix)	1992	Volume 3 compilation album, Sharks Patrol These Waters compilation album, "Belfast Wasted" single by Orbital, Infernal Love deluxe edition	Remixed by Harvey Birrell
Teethgrinder (Tee Hee Dub Mix)	1992	"Teethgrinder" 12" single, "Nausea" US promo single, Nurse deluxe edition	
Teethgrinder (Unsane Mix)	1992	"Teethgrinder" 12" single, Nurse deluxe edition	Remixed by Unsane
Summer Of Hate	1992	"Teethgrinder" single, Nurse Japanese album, So Much For the Ten Year Plan bonus disc, So Much For the Ten Year Plan Japanese album, Nurse deluxe edition	Nurse outtake
Human Mechanism	1992	"Teethgrinder" single, Nurse Japanese album, Nurse deluxe edition	Nurse outtake
Sky High McKay(e)	1992	"Teethgrinder" single, Nurse Japanese album, Nurse deluxe edition	Nurse outtake. Instrumental
Nausea (1992 demo)	2021	Nurse deluxe edition	
Teethgrinder (1992 demo)	2021	Nurse deluxe edition	
Disgraceland (1992 demo)	2021	Nurse deluxe edition	
Zipless (1992 demo)	2021	Nurse deluxe edition	
Human Mechanism (1992 demo)	2021	Nurse deluxe edition	
Accelerator (1992 demo)	2021	Nurse deluxe edition	
Deep Sleep (1992 demo)	2021	Nurse deluxe edition	
Hypermania (1992 demo)	2021	Nurse deluxe edition	
Sky High McKay(e) (1992 demo)	2021	Nurse deluxe edition	
Nausea (Live From The Studio Floor 1992)	2021	Nurse deluxe edition	
Summer of Hate (Live From The Studio Floor 1992)	2021	Nurse deluxe edition	
Neck Freak (Live From The Studio Floor 1992)	2021	Nurse deluxe edition	
Potato Junkie (live)	1992	"Rock N' Europe '92" compilation album	EBU Festival, Kranhallen, Aalborg, Denmark 19/9/92
Teenage Kicks	1992	"Have A Merry Fucking Christmas" 7" single, "Peel Out In The States" compilation album	Originally by The Undertones
With Or Without You	1992	"Have A Merry Fucking Christmas" 7" single	U2 cover
Invisible Sun	1993	Peace Together compilation album, "Be Still" single by "Peace Together"	The Police cover
Auto Surgery	1993	Shortsharpshock EP, Hats Off to the Insane EP, Troublegum deluxe edition	
Totally Random Man	1993	Shortsharpshock EP, Hats Off to the Insane EP, Troublegum deluxe edition	
Accelerator	1993	Shortsharpshock EP, Troublegum deluxe edition, Kalifornia soundtrack	Different from Nurse version
Speedball	1993	Face The Strange EP, Hats Off to the Insane EP, Born In A Crash EP, Troublegum deluxe edition, S.F.W. soundtrack	
Bloody Blue	1993	Face The Strange EP, Hats Off to the Insane Japanese EP, Born In A Crash EP, "Perversonality" US promo single, Troublegum deluxe edition	
Neck Freak	1993	Face The Strange EP, Hats Off to the Insane Japanese EP, Born In A Crash EP, "Perversonality" US promo single, Troublegum deluxe edition	Different from Nurse version
Opal Mantra	1993	Opal Mantra single, Hats Off to the Insane EP, Born In A Crash EP, Troublegum deluxe edition	Non-album single, its name being a pun on the Opel Manta car
Opal Mantra (live)	1993	Opal Mantra clear 7" single, Troublegum deluxe edition	The Forum, London, England 11/6/93
Innocent X (live)	1993	Opal Mantra EP, Born In A Crash EP, Troublegum deluxe edition	Columbia University, New York, USA 16/4/93
Potato Junkie (live)	1993	Opal Mantra EP, Born In A Crash EP, Troublegum deluxe edition	CBGB's, New York, USA 25/5/93
Nausea (live)	1993	Opal Mantra EP, Born In A Crash EP, Troublegum deluxe edition	CBGB's, New York, USA 25/5/93
Come And Die	1993	"Judgement Night" soundtrack	Therapy? & Fatal
Totally Random Man (demo)	2014	Troublegum deluxe edition	
Turn (demo)	2014	Troublegum deluxe edition	
Knives (demo)	2014	Troublegum deluxe edition	
Unbeliever (demo)	2014	Troublegum deluxe edition	
Knives (live)	1994	Secret Tracks Select magazine compilation cassette	Club Quattro, Tokyo, Japan 14/10/93
Neck Freak (live)	1994	Live In Japan (Fan Club Edition) cassette	Club Quattro, Tokyo, Japan 14/10/93
Screamager (live)	1994	Live In Japan (Fan Club Edition) cassette	Club Quattro, Tokyo, Japan 14/10/93
Turn (live)	1994	Live In Japan (Fan Club Edition) cassette	Club Quattro, Tokyo, Japan 14/10/93
Totally Random Man (live)	1994	Live In Japan (Fan Club Edition) cassette	Club Quattro, Tokyo, Japan 14/10/93
Meat Abstract (live)	1994	Live In Japan (Fan Club Edition) cassette (selected copies only, uncredited)	Club Quattro, Tokyo, Japan 13/10/93
Iron Man	1994	Nativity in Black compilation album, "I Just Want You" single by Ozzy Osbourne	Therapy? & Ozzy Osbourne. Black Sabbath cover
Evil Elvis (The Lost Demo)	1994	"Die Laughing" single, "Misery" US promo single, So Much For the Ten Year Plan bonus disc, So Much For the Ten Year Plan Japanese album, Troublegum deluxe edition	
Pantopon Rose	1994	"Nowhere" single, Troublegum Japanese album, "Femtex" 7" single, "Knives" US promo single, Troublegum deluxe edition	Troublegum outtake
Breaking The Law	1994	"Nowhere" single, Troublegum deluxe edition	Judas Priest cover
CC Rider	1994	"Nowhere" single, Troublegum deluxe edition	Elvis Presley cover
Nowhere (Sabres of Paradise Mix)	1994	"Nowhere" single, "Trigger Inside" 12" single, Troublegum deluxe edition	Remixed by Sabres of Paradise
Nowhere (Therapeutic Distortion Mix)	1994	"Nowhere" single, "Trigger Inside" 12" single, Troublegum deluxe edition	Remixed by Sabres of Paradise
Jonestown Mind (Therapy? Remix)	1994	"Jonestown Mind" single by The Almighty	Remixed by Therapy?
Diable (Therapy? Remix)	1994	The Remix Wars album by Pitchshifter	Remixed by Therapy?
Nice N' Sleazy	1994	"Trigger Inside" single, "Nowhere" European single, Troublegum deluxe edition	The Stranglers cover
Reuters	1994	"Trigger Inside" single, "Nowhere" European single, Troublegum deluxe edition	Wire cover
Tatty Seaside Town	1994	"Trigger Inside" single, "Nowhere" European single, "Die Laughing" US promo single, Troublegum deluxe edition	The Membranes cover
Trigger Inside (Psycho Amigo Mix)	1994	"Trigger Inside" 12" single, Troublegum deluxe edition	Remixed by Sabres of Paradise
Trigger Inside (Psycho Amigo Instrumental)	1994	"Trigger Inside" 12" single, Troublegum deluxe edition	Remixed by Sabres of Paradise
Die Laughing (David Holmes Mix 1)	1994	"Die Laughing" 12" single, Troublegum deluxe edition	Remixed by David Holmes
Die Laughing (David Holmes Mix 2)	1994	"Die Laughing" 12" single, Troublegum deluxe edition	Remixed by David Holmes
Stop It You're Killing Me (live)	1994	"Die Laughing" single, Troublegum deluxe edition	Town & Country, Leeds, England 27/2/94
Trigger Inside (live)	1994	"Die Laughing" single, Troublegum deluxe edition	Town & Country, Leeds, England 27/2/94
Isolation (live)	1994	"K-Vox Blasting The Air Waves" Vox magazine compilation cassette	Originally by Joy Division
Lunacy Booth (String version)	1994	"Isolation" single, So Much For the Ten Year Plan bonus disc, Troublegum deluxe edition	Chamber interpretation of Troublegum track, arranged and recorded by Martin McCarrick
Isolation (Consolidated Mix)	1994	"Isolation" single, "Misery" US promo single, So Much For the Ten Year Plan bonus disc, Troublegum deluxe edition	Remixed by Consolidated
Isolation (Consolidated Synth Mix)	1995	"Stories" single, Infernal Love Japanese album, Troublegum deluxe edition	Remixed by Consolidated
Knives (Kiddie Version)	1994	"Knives" US promo single, Troublegum deluxe edition	Censored version of Troublegum track
Bowels of Love (aka Hunks Of Burnin' Love)	1994	"The King And I" compilation 10"	Therapy? appear as "Mondo Paddy?". Different from Infernal Love version
Stories (Cello version)	1995	"Stories" single	Essentially just the vocal and cello tracks of the song
Our Love Must Die	1995	"Loose" single, Infernal Love deluxe edition	Infernal Love outtake
Nice Guys	1995	"Loose" single, Infernal Love deluxe edition	Infernal Love outtake
Loose (Photek Remix)	1995	"Loose" single, "Altered States" compilation album, "A Journey Into Drum 'n' Bass" compilation album, Infernal Love deluxe edition	Remixed by Photek
Loose	1995	"Loose" US promo single, "Infernal Love" promo album, Infernal Love Japanese album, Infernal Love deluxe edition	Includes pre-song intro cut from album version. Length: 3:12
Die Laughing (live)	1995	"Loose" single, Infernal Love deluxe edition	University, Norwich, England 9/6/95
Nowhere (live)	1995	"Loose" single, Infernal Love deluxe edition	University, Norwich, England 9/6/95
Unbeliever (live)	1995	"Loose" single, Infernal Love deluxe edition	University, Norwich, England 9/6/95
Stories (live)	1995	"Misery" US promo single, Infernal Love deluxe edition, "Unheard Pleasures" Select magazine compilation cassette	University, Norwich, England 9/6/95
Knives (live)	1995	"Misery" US promo single, Infernal Love deluxe edition	University, Norwich, England 9/6/95
Screamager (live)	1995	"Class of 95" Vox magazine compilation cassette	University, Norwich, England 9/6/95
Lunacy Booth (live)	1996	"Official Fan Club 1996" EP	Luxor, Arnhem, Holland 14/7/95
Loose (live)	1996	"Official Fan Club 1996" EP, "Stories" re-issue single	Luxor, Arnhem, Holland 14/7/95
Die Laughing (live)	1996	"Official Fan Club 1996" EP	Luxor, Arnhem, Holland 14/7/95
A Moment Of Clarity (live)	1996	"Official Fan Club 1996" EP, "Stories" re-issue single	Luxor, Arnhem, Holland 14/7/95
Our Love Must Die (live)	1996	"Official Fan Club 1996" EP, "Stories" re-issue single	Luxor, Arnhem, Holland 14/7/95
Knives (live)	1996	"Official Fan Club 1996" EP	Luxor, Arnhem, Holland 14/7/95
Turn (live)	1996	"Official Fan Club 1996" EP	Luxor, Arnhem, Holland 14/7/95
Screamager (live)	1996	"Official Fan Club 1996" EP	Luxor, Arnhem, Holland 14/7/95
Misery (Acoustic)	1995	"Diane" single, Infernal Love Japanese album, Infernal Love deluxe edition	
Die Laughing (Acoustic)	1995	"Diane" single, Infernal Love deluxe edition	"Collins and Maconies Hit Parade" BBC Radio One
Screamager (Acoustic)	1995	"Diane" single, Infernal Love deluxe edition	"Collins and Maconies Hit Parade" BBC Radio One
Jude The Obscene (Acoustic)	1995	"Diane" single, Infernal Love deluxe edition	
Loose (Acoustic)	1995	"Diane" single, Infernal Love deluxe edition	
30 Seconds (Acoustic)	1995	"Diane" single, Infernal Love deluxe edition	
Disgracelands (Acoustic)	1996	"Bad Mother" single, Infernal Love deluxe edition	
Diane (Acoustic)	1996	"Bad Mother" single, Infernal Love deluxe edition	
Opal Mantra (Acoustic)	1996	"Bad Mother" single, Infernal Love deluxe edition	
Vicar In A Tutu	1996	The Smiths Is Dead compilation album	The Smiths cover
Where Eagles Dare	1996	"Violent World" compilation album, So Much For the Ten Year Plan bonus disc	The Misfits cover
Loose (live)	1996	"Metallurgy 3" compilation album	Axis, Boston, USA 17/8/96
Church Of Noise (Messenger Mix)	1998	"Church Of Noise" single	Remixed by Messenger
Suing God	1998	"Church Of Noise" single, "Semi-Detached" Japanese album	"Semi-Detached" outtake
60 Watt Bulb	1998	"Church Of Noise" single, "Semi-Detached" Japanese album	"Semi-Detached" outtake
Kids Stuff	1998	"Lonely, Cryin', Only" single	"Semi-Detached" outtake
High Noon	1998	"Lonely, Cryin', Only" single	Originally by DJ Shadow
Diane (New Recording)	1998	"Lonely, Cryin', Only" single	Originally by Hüsker Dü. Full band recording, different from Infernal Love version
Teethgrinder (New Recording)	1998	"Lonely, Cryin', Only" single	Different from Nurse version
Disgracelands (New Recording)	1998	"Lonely, Cryin', Only" single	Different from Nurse version
Skyward (New Recording)	1998	"Lonely, Cryin', Only" 7" single	Different from "Baby Teeth" version
Screamager (live)	1998	"Radio Kerrang!" Kerrang! magazine compilation album	Astoria, London, England 20/1/98
Tightrope Walker (live)	1998	"NME Clean Sweep" NME magazine compilation album	Astoria, London, England 20/1/98
Little Tongues First (live)	1999	"Suicide Pact – You First" Japanese album	Leadmill, Sheffield, England 16/10/99
He's Not That Kind Of Girl (live)	1999	"Suicide Pact – You First" Japanese album	Leadmill, Sheffield, England 16/10/99
Six Mile Water (live)	2000	"Hate Kill Destroy" single, "Six Mile Water" promo single	AB, Brussels, Belgium 8/12/99
Sister (live)	2000	"Hate Kill Destroy" single	AB, Brussels, Belgium 8/12/99
Die Laughing (live)	2005	"10 Jahre Forest Glade" compilation album	ForestGlade Festival, Wiesen, Austria 9/7/00. Audience member on drums
Little Tongues First (live)	2005	"10 Jahre Forest Glade" compilation album, unlisted track	ForestGlade Festival, Wiesen, Austria 9/7/00
Denim Demon	2001	"Shameless" Japanese album, "Alpha Motherfuckers" compilation album	Originally by Turbonegro
Big Time	2001	"Shameless" Japanese album, "Shameless" European promo album	Originally by Rudi
Gimme Gimme Gimme (A Man After Midnight)	2001	"Gimme Back My Brain" single	Originally by ABBA
Gimme Danger	2001	"Gimme Back My Brain" single	Originally by The Stooges
Gimme Nyquil All Night Long	2001	"Gimme Back My Brain" single	Originally by EC8OR
Gimme Therapy	2001	"Gimme Back My Brain" 7" single, "I Am The Money" European single	
Gimme Gimme Shock Treatment	2001	"Gimme Back My Brain" 7" single, "I Am The Money" European single	Originally by The Ramones
Gimme Gimme Gimme	2001	"Gimme Back My Brain" 7" single	Originally by Black Flag
I Am The Money (Full Length version)	2001	"I Am The Money" single	Long version of "Shameless" single
Tango Romeo (Original demo)	2001	"I Am The Money" single	Demo for "Shameless" song. Re-working of 1995 song "The Sweeney"
Fat Camp II	2001	"I Am The Money" single	Instrumental
Bad Karma (live)	2001	"I Am The Money" single	FujiTV Session, London, England 1/11/00
Mama, You Can Call The Ambulance Now	2003	"If It Kills Me/Rust" single	"High Anxiety" outtake
If It Kills Me (live)	2003	"My Voodoo Doll" single, "Scopophobia" bonus disc	Mandela Hall, Belfast, Northern Ireland 6/6/03
Screamager (live)	2003	"My Voodoo Doll" single, "Scopophobia" bonus disc	Mandela Hall, Belfast, Northern Ireland 6/6/03
Teethgrinder (live)	2003	"My Voodoo Doll" single, "Scopophobia" bonus disc	Mandela Hall, Belfast, Northern Ireland 6/6/03
Die Laughing (live)	2005	"Polar Bear/Rock You Monkeys" single	Alive Festival, St. Vith, Belgium 31/7/04. 192 kbit/s MP3 download only
Freeze The Remains	2006	"Sound Check" Rock Sound magazine compilation album & from iTunes, One Cure Fits All deluxe edition	One Cure Fits All outtake
Crazy Cocaine Eyes	2006	"Rain Hits Concrete" EP, One Cure Fits All deluxe edition	One Cure Fits All outtake. Download only
Hard Work Hope	2006	"Rain Hits Concrete" EP, One Cure Fits All deluxe edition	One Cure Fits All outtake. Download only
Play On	2006	"Rain Hits Concrete" EP, One Cure Fits All deluxe edition	One Cure Fits All outtake, dedicated to late footballers George Best and Brian Clough. Download only
Sprung (2005 demo)	2026	One Cure Fits All deluxe edition	
Deluded Son (2005 demo)	2026	One Cure Fits All deluxe edition	
Into the Light (2005 demo)	2026	One Cure Fits All deluxe edition	
Lose It All (2005 demo)	2026	One Cure Fits All deluxe edition	
Dopamine, Seratonin, Adenaline (2005 demo)	2026	One Cure Fits All deluxe edition	
Unconsoled (2005 demo)	2026	One Cure Fits All deluxe edition	
Our White Noise (2005 demo)	2026	One Cure Fits All deluxe edition	
Private Nobody (2005 demo)	2026	One Cure Fits All deluxe edition	
Rain Hits Concrete (2005 demo)	2026	One Cure Fits All deluxe edition	
Fear of God (2005 demo)	2026	One Cure Fits All deluxe edition	
Heart Beat Hits (2005 demo)	2026	One Cure Fits All deluxe edition	
Walk Through Darkness (2005 demo)	2026	One Cure Fits All deluxe edition	
Screamager (live)	2007	"Webgig"	Hive Studio, Derby, England 19/9/06. MWV video & 192 kbit/s MP3 download only
A Moment Of Clarity (live)	2007	"Webgig"	Hive Studio, Derby, England 19/9/06. MWV video & 192 kbit/s MP3 download only
Straight Life (live)	2007	"Webgig"	Hive Studio, Derby, England 19/9/06. MWV video & 192 kbit/s MP3 download only
Knives (live)	2007	"Webgig"	Hive Studio, Derby, England 19/9/06. MWV video & 192 kbit/s MP3 download only
Teethgrinder (live)	2007	"Webgig"	Hive Studio, Derby, England 19/9/06. MWV video & 192 kbit/s MP3 download only
Lonely, Cryin' Only (live)	2007	"Webgig"	Hive Studio, Derby, England 19/9/06. MWV video & 192 kbit/s MP3 download only
Die Laughing (live)	2007	"Webgig"	Hive Studio, Derby, England 19/9/06. MWV video & 192 kbit/s MP3 download only
Nowhere (live)	2007	"Webgig"	Hive Studio, Derby, England 19/9/06. MWV video & 192 kbit/s MP3 download only
Dancin' With Manson (live)	2007	"Webgig"	Hive Studio, Derby, England 19/9/06. MWV video & 192 kbit/s MP3 download only
Evil Elvis (live)	2007	"Webgig"	Hive Studio, Derby, England 19/9/06. MWV video & 192 kbit/s MP3 download only
If It Kills Me (live)	2007	"Webgig"	Hive Studio, Derby, England 19/9/06. MWV video & 192 kbit/s MP3 download only
Suing God (live)	2007	"Webgig"	Hive Studio, Derby, England 19/9/06. MWV video & 192 kbit/s MP3 download only
Don't Try	2009	Crooked Timber single, Crooked Timber Gold deluxe edition album	Crooked Timber outtake
Low Winter Sun	2009	Crooked Timber single, Crooked Timber Gold deluxe edition album	Crooked Timber outtake
Crooked Timber (Breathless FX Mix)	2009	Crooked Timber single, Crooked Timber Gold deluxe edition album	Mixed by Andy Gill. Alternate album mix
Exiles (Sample Mix)	2010	Crooked Timber Gold deluxe edition album, "Exiles" single	
Magic Mountain (Sample Mix)	2010	Crooked Timber Gold deluxe edition album	
Bad Excuse For Daylight (Sample Mix)	2010	Crooked Timber Gold deluxe edition album	
Exiles (Bong-Ra Guttural Exodus Remix)	2010	Crooked Timber Gold deluxe edition album	Mixed by Bong-Ra
Magic Mountain (Snug Slut Remix)	2010	Crooked Timber Gold deluxe edition album	
Exiles (Subglitch & Stitch Remix)	2010	"Exiles" single	Download only
Magic Mountain (The Dubious Twins Babylon Remix)	2010	"Exiles" single	Download only
We Kill People	2015	Disquiet album pre-order	320kbit/s MP3 download only
Demons! Demons!	2015	"Still Hurts" single	Download only
Armed With Anger	2015	"Still Hurts" single	Download only
If You're Driving Pull Over	2015	"Deathstimate" single	Download only
Electricity	2015	"Deathstimate" single	Download only. OMD cover
Slippies	2016	"Tides" single	
Smile or Die	2016	"Tides" single	
Insecurity (Pitchphase Remix)	2016	"Tides" single	Remixed by Pitchphase
Hail to the Lovers (Therapy? Remix)	2016	"Inner Space/Outer Space" remix album by The Membranes	Remixed by Therapy?. Pledge Music release
If It Kills Me (Acoustic)	2016	Wood & Wire album	
Screamager (Acoustic)	2016	Wood & Wire album	
Idiot Cousin (Acoustic)	2016	Wood & Wire album	
Die Laughing (Acoustic)	2016	Wood & Wire album	
Tides (Acoustic)	2016	Wood & Wire album	
Nobody Here But Us (Acoustic)	2016	Wood & Wire album	
A Moment of Clarity (Acoustic)	2016	Wood & Wire album	
Skyward (Acoustic)	2016	Wood & Wire album	
Loose (Acoustic)	2016	Wood & Wire album	
Nowhere (Acoustic)	2016	Wood & Wire album	
Gone (Acoustic)	2016	Wood & Wire album	
River (Therapy? Remix)	2018	Death of the Shadows EP by Robyn G Shiels	Remixed by Therapy?. Digital release
(D U S T) (Therapy? Remix)	2020	"Love Above All" album by Arvo Party	Remixed by Therapy?. Digital release
Resurrected (Therapy? Remix)	2021	"There Is More Madness Here" album by System Of Hate	Remixed by Therapy?.

== Official website free MP3 downloads ==
The following is a table of Official Website Free MP3 Downloads meeting the following criteria;

- Songs released exclusively free via the official website (or mailing list) and unavailable elsewhere are included here.
- Songs on any official release are not included here.
- The columns Title, Recorded, Source, MP3 kbit/s and Notes list each song title, the year the song was recorded, the audio source, the bit-rate of the download and any notes accompanying the song.

Title	Recorded	Source	MP3 kbit/s	Notes
Skinning Pit (live)	16/11/91, Walkers Hotel, Drogheda, Ireland	Soundboard	128	
Bad Mother (live)	28/12/95, The Point, Dublin, Ireland	Soundboard	128	
Serge	1995, Studio, London, England	Soundboard	160?	Casey Jones Reaction
Apple	1995, Studio, London, England	Soundboard	160?	Casey Jones Reaction
Untitled 1	1995, Martin McCarrick's home, London, England	Soundboard	160?	Casey Jones Reaction
Marie Celeste	1995, Martin McCarrick's home, London, England	Soundboard	160?	Casey Jones Reaction
Untitled 2	1995, Martin McCarrick's home, London, England	Soundboard	160?	Casey Jones Reaction
5-In-Between-5-6	1995, Martin McCarrick's home, London, England	Soundboard	160?	Casey Jones Reaction
Benders End (Short)	1995, Martin McCarrick's home, London, England	Soundboard	160?	Casey Jones Reaction
Sominexpress	1995, Martin McCarrick's home, London, England	Soundboard	160?	Casey Jones Reaction
Passing Traffic	1995, Martin McCarrick's home, London, England	Soundboard	160?	Casey Jones Reaction
Benders End (Complete)	1995, Martin McCarrick's home, London, England	Soundboard	160?	Casey Jones Reaction
Titanic	1997, Homestead Studio, Randalstown, Northern Ireland	Soundboard	128	Early demo of "Lonely Cryin' Only"
Tightrope Walker (live)	29/8/98, Lowlands Festival, Dronten, Holland	Soundboard	128	
Skyward (live acoustic)	25/10/00, 013, Tilburg, Holland	Soundboard	128	
Joey (demo)	2000, Pete Webbers Studio, London, England	Soundboard	unknown	90 second snippet
Endless Psychology (demo)	2000, Pete Webbers Studio, London, England	Soundboard	128?	
Stalk n' Slash (demo)	2000, Pete Webbers Studio, London, England	Soundboard	128?	
Limbo (demo)	2002, Real World Studios, Box, England	Soundboard	64	Earlier demo version to the one which later appeared in The Gemil Box
If It Kills Me (demo)	2002, Real World Studios, Box, England	Soundboard	128?	
Rise Up (demo)	2004, Stanbridge Farm Studios, London, England	Soundboard	128?	4 separate "progression" demos
Perish the Thought (demo)	2004, Stanbridge Farm Studios, London, England	Soundboard	128?	4 separate "progression" demos
Long Distance (demo)	2004, Stanbridge Farm Studios, London, England	Soundboard	128?	3 separate "progression" demos
So-Called Life (demo)	2004, Stanbridge Farm Studios, London, England	Soundboard	160?	Uploaded as single MP3 w/ "This Ship is Sinking" demo
This Ship is Sinking (demo)	2004, Stanbridge Farm Studios, London, England	Soundboard	160?	Uploaded as single MP3 w/ "So-Called Life" demo
Screamager (live)	1/5/04, Mandela Hall, Belfast, Northern Ireland	FM, Webcast, Soundboard	128	unknown which source was used
Dancin' With Manson (live)	1/5/04, Mandela Hall, Belfast, Northern Ireland	FM, Webcast, Soundboard	128	unknown which source was used
Black Night (live w/ Bruce Dickinson)	1/5/04, Mandela Hall, Belfast, Northern Ireland	FM, Webcast, Soundboard	128	unknown which source was used. Originally by Deep Purple.
Knives (live acoustic)	20/4/05, Oui FM Studios, Paris, France	FM, Webcast, Soundboard	160	unknown which source was used
Unconsoled (demo)	2005, Pingle Farm Studios, London, England	Soundboard	128?	3 separate "progression" demos. The final demo also later released, losslessly, on One Cure Fits All deluxe edition
Rain Hits Concrete (demo)	2005, Pingle Farm Studios, London, England	Soundboard	128?	3 separate "progression" demos. The final demo also later released, losslessly, on One Cure Fits All deluxe edition
Fear of God (demo)	2005, Pingle Farm Studios, London, England	Soundboard	128?	3 separate "progression" demos. The final demo also later released, losslessly, on One Cure Fits All deluxe edition
Sprung (demo)	2005, Pingle Farm Studios, London, England	Soundboard	128?	3 separate "progression" demos. The final demo also later released, losslessly, in The Gemil Box and on One Cure Fits All deluxe edition
Crazy Cocaine Eyes (Cashier No. 9 Remix)	2006	Soundboard	160	Remixed by Cashier No. 9
Exiles (Vandal Remix)	2010	Soundboard	320	Remixed by Vandal
Plague Bell (Motorcade Remix)	2012	Soundboard	320	Remixed by Tom Delgety & Nic. Mailing list freebie (2015)

== Rare unreleased songs ==
The following is a table of rare non-released songs meeting the following criteria:

- Noteworthy songs released on bootlegs are included here.
- Noteworthy songs not available yet in any form are included here.
- Noteworthy songs released via streaming (not download) on official sites are included here.
- Songs on any official release are not included here.
- The columns Title, Recorded, Source, Available and Notes list each song title, the year the song was recorded, the audio source, the availability of the song and any notes accompanying the song.

Title	Recorded	Source	Available	Notes
Gloria (rehearsal)	6/8/89, Home, Larne, Northern Ireland	Open Mic	No	Originally by Them
You (rehearsal)	6/8/89, Home, Larne, Northern Ireland	Open Mic	No	
Mind Body Soul (rehearsal)	1989, Home, Larne, Northern Ireland	Open Mic	Yes, trading circles	7.5 minute version. A much shorter, aborted recording was attempted in 1994, included in The Gemil Box
Something (live)	28/2/90, Errigle Inn, Belfast, Northern Ireland	Audience	Yes, trading circles	Charlie McKeegan on drums
Limdrip (live)	28/2/90, Errigle Inn, Belfast, Northern Ireland	Audience	Yes, trading circles	Charlie McKeegan on drums
Reality Fuck	14/10/90, RTÉ Studios, Dublin, Ireland	Soundboard, FM	Yes, trading circles	Dave Fanning 2FM Session. Early version of "Die Laughing"
Unknown song (live)	30/3/91, Nancy Spains, Cork, Ireland	Soundboard	Yes, trading circles	Possible early version of "Pantopon Rose". Recording cuts in.
Neck Freak (live)	6/6/92, Finsbury Park, London, England	Soundboard	Yes, official YouTube	
Penis Temple	1992, Loco Studios, Caerleon, Newport, Wales	Soundboard	No	
Knives (live)	16/9/93, Nighttown, Rotterdam, Holland	Soundboard	Yes, official YouTube	Released as promo for Troublegum deluxe edition
Gone / Meat Abstract (live)	14/10/93, Club Quattro, Tokyo, Japan	Soundboard	Yes, official YouTube	Released as promo for Troublegum deluxe edition
Speedball (live)	1993, USA	Soundboard	Yes, official YouTube	Released as promo for Troublegum deluxe edition
Unknown song	1993, Chipping Norton Recording Studios, Oxfordshire, England	Soundboard	No	Troublegum outtake. Music recorded only
Unknown song (live)	15/6/94, Gazi, Athens, Greece	Audience	Yes, trading circles	Different song to unknown Troublegum outtake
Unbeliever (live)	25/8/94, Sunstroke Festival, Dublin, Ireland	Soundboard	Yes, official YouTube	Released as promo for Troublegum deluxe edition. Page Hamilton on guitar
Meat Abstract/Neck Freak/Teethgrinder (live medley)	25/8/94, Sunstroke Festival, Dublin, Ireland	Soundboard	Yes, official YouTube	Released as promo for Troublegum deluxe edition
Next To You (live w/ Sting)	17/10/94, Taratata (TV Show), Paris, France	Soundboard	Yes, 7" bootleg	The Police cover
Another Girl Another Planet (live w/ Peter Perrett)	27/11/94, Empire, London, England	Audience	Yes, trading circles	Originally by The Only Ones
A Teenager In Love (acoustic)	1994 or 1995, Maida Vale Studios, London, England	FM	Yes, trading circles	Collins & Maconie's Hit Parade, BBC Radio One. Originally by Dion and the Belmonts
Duck Symphony	1995, Real World Studios, Box, England	Soundboard	No	Infernal Love outtake
Michaels Song OR Cheap Trick	1/6/95, Marcus Studios, London, England	Soundboard	No	Andy vocals only. Music recorded elsewhere. One of these working titles became "Nice Guys", the other remains unreleased.
Again (live)	30/12/95, Ulster Hall, Belfast, Northern Ireland	FM	Yes, trading circles	Early version of "Stay Happy"
Alternative Ulster (live w/ Ricky Warwick)	30/12/95, Ulster Hall, Belfast, Northern Ireland	FM	Yes, trading circles	Stiff Little Fingers cover
Bad Reputation (Thin Lizzy live w/ Andy & Michael)	4/1/96, Point, Dublin, Ireland	FM	Yes, trading circles	Thin Lizzy cover
New Song In D (live)	8/5/96, Crocodile Cafe, Seattle, WA, USA	Audience	Yes, trading circles	Early version of "Joey".
Church Of Noise	1997, Homestead Studio, Randalstown, Northern Ireland	Soundboard	Yes, trading circles	Includes banned Ian Paisley sampled intro
I'm Sick Of You (live acoustic)	7/10/99, Crossing Border Festival, Den Haag, Holland	Audience	Yes, trading circles	The Stooges cover. Andy & Martin acoustic
Suicide Pact	1999, Great Linford Manor Studio, Milton Keynes, England	Soundboard	No	Soundtrack to unreleased film "The Speedo Menace"
I Left My Nose in San Francisco (live acoustic)	24/10/00, Botanique, Brussels, Belgium	Audience	Yes, trading circles	Andy & Martin acoustic [Casey Jones Reaction]
Unknown song (live acoustic)	24/10/00, Botanique, Brussels, Belgium	Audience	Yes, trading circles	Andy & Martin acoustic [Casey Jones Reaction]
Noriega Blue (live acoustic)	24/10/00, Botanique, Brussels, Belgium	Audience	Yes, trading circles	Andy & Martin acoustic [Casey Jones Reaction]
Blood Sucking Freaks	2001, Bob Lang Studios, Seattle, WA, USA	Soundboard	No	Shameless outtake. Originally by The Black Halos
Bad Moon Rising (acoustic)	9/5/03, Today FM Studios, Dublin, Ireland	FM	Yes, trading circles	Originally by Creedance Clearwater Revival. Tom Dunne Session. Andy acoustic
Dead Shark	23/10/03, De Bosuil, Weert, Holland	Unknown	No	
Shamburger	24/10/03, Tivoli, Utrecht, Holland	Unknown	No	
Two Bags	2/11/03, Tavastia, Helsinki, Finland	Audience	Yes, trading circles	Early version of "Save the Sermon"
Tropical Breeze	3/11/03, John Dee, Oslo, Norway	Unknown	No	
Heavy Metal Morrissey	2/12/03, Cockpit, Leeds, England	Unknown	No	
Old Europe	2004, Hive Studio, Derby, England	Soundboard	No	Never Apologise Never Explain demo
I Won't Let You Die Alone	2004, Stanbridge Farm Studio, London, England	Soundboard	No	Never Apologise Never Explain demo
The Third Face	2004, Stanbridge Farm Studio, London, England	Soundboard	No	Never Apologise Never Explain demo
Waiting For An Alibi (live)	20/8/05, Barfly, London, England	Audience	Yes, trading circles	Thin Lizzy cover
Sonic Reducer (live w/ The Space Cowboys)	13/10/06, La Laiterie, Strasbourg, France	Audience	Yes, trading circles	Dead Boys cover
Miles Apart (live)	4/3/07, Islington Academy, London, England	Audience	Yes, trading circles	Mega City Four cover. Andy acoustic w/ Diamond Dave
Treacle Feet	24/3/09, Blackstaff Studios, Belfast, Northern Ireland	Soundboard, FM, Webcast	Yes, trading circles	Introducing BBC Session. Instrumental. Early version of Living In The Shadow Of The Terrible Thing.
Three Sides To Every Story (live w/ Ricky Warwick)	5/12/09, Musiekodroom, Hasselt, Belgium	Audience	Yes, trading circles	Ricky Warwick cover
Plague Bell (Beefclaw Remix)	2012	Soundboard	Yes, Beefclaw's official soundcloud	Remixed by Beefclaw
Get Your Dead Hand Off My Shoulder (Wizard Remix)	2012	Soundboard	Yes, Wizard's official soundcloud	Remixed by Wizard. Part of "Bombs N Bass Vol 2" by Wizard & Ivory, downloads as 320 kbit/s MP3
Into The Valley (live)	30/11/12, Garage, Glasgow, Scotland	Open-mic video	Yes, official website	The Skids cover
No Government (live)	24/5/13, Bodega Social Club, Nottingham, England	Unknown	No	Anti-Pasti cover. Andy acoustic
Outcast (live)	26/5/13, Cluny, Newcastle, England	Unknown	No	The Animals cover. Andy acoustic
Sick Boy (live)	5/6/13, Melkweg, Amsterdam, Holland	Audience	Yes, trading circles	GBH cover. Andy acoustic
State Violence – State Control (live)	7/6/13, 013, Tilburg, Holland	Audience	Yes, trading circles	Originally by Discharge. Andy acoustic
Being Boiled (live)	17/9/14, Grey Stones, Sheffield, England	Unknown	No	The Human League cover. Andy acoustic
Pirates	2014, Blast Studios, Newcastle, England	Soundboard	No	Burial cover. Recorded during Disquiet album sessions (drums & feedback guitar only)
Transmission (live)	4/3/16, Academy, Manchester, England	Soundboard audio with multi-cam audience video	Yes, official website	Joy Division cover. Performed with The Membranes
Kung Fu (live)	5/9/16, Ulster Hall, Belfast, Northern Ireland	Soundboard audio with multi-cam video	Yes, BBC website & YouTube (video), Webcast (audio)	Ash cover
Needle of Death	17/4/17, Audio Production Workshop Session, London, England	Soundboard audio with multi-cam video	Yes, Youtube	Bert Jansch cover. Andy acoustic
Flashback Jack (live)	23/6/17, Parkpop Festival, Den Haag, Holland	Audience	Yes, trading circles	
Possessed	2018, Blast Studios, Newcastle, England	Soundboard	No	Venom cover
Shot By Both Sides	2018, Blast Studios, Newcastle, England	Soundboard	No	Magazine cover
Piggies (live)	30/6/18, Ramblin' Man Fair, Maidstone, England	Soundboard audio with multi-cam video	No	The Beatles cover. Performed acoustic for "Ramblin' Man TV"
Suspect Device	5/9/25, 229 The Venue, London, England	Audience	Yes, Youtube	Stiff Little Fingers cover
Shadow Play	5/9/25, 229 The Venue, London, England	Audience	Yes, Youtube	Rory Gallagher cover
Transilvanian Hunger	5/9/25, 229 The Venue, London, England	Audience	Yes, Youtube	Darkthrone cover

== Unofficial bootleg releases ==
- "Have a Merry Fucking Christmas" (7")
- "Next to You / Invisible Sun" (7", turquoise)
- "Live at the Astoria" (12") (London '92)
- "I Want My Money Back" (London '92)
- "Who Did This?" (Berlin '93)
- "No Love Lost" (Hultsfred '93, Roskilde '93, Feile '93, Aalborg '92)
- "Fistful of Power" (Donington '94)
- "Isolation" (Wolverhampton '94)
- "Absolutely Barking" (Donington '94, London '94)
- "Clash Therapy" (Stockholm '94)
- "Not Lunacy" (Stockholm '94)
- "Shock Treatment" (Florence '94)
- "Iron Man" (Florence '94)
- "Europe 1994" (Donington '94, Glasgow '94, London '94)
- "Live in England 94" (Donington '94, London '92)
- "Good Fuckin' Night" (Glasgow '94)
- "Dead Laughing" (Arnhem '95)
- "The Black Sessions" (Paris '95)
- "Infernal Gum" (B-Sides)
