= Therapy? discography =

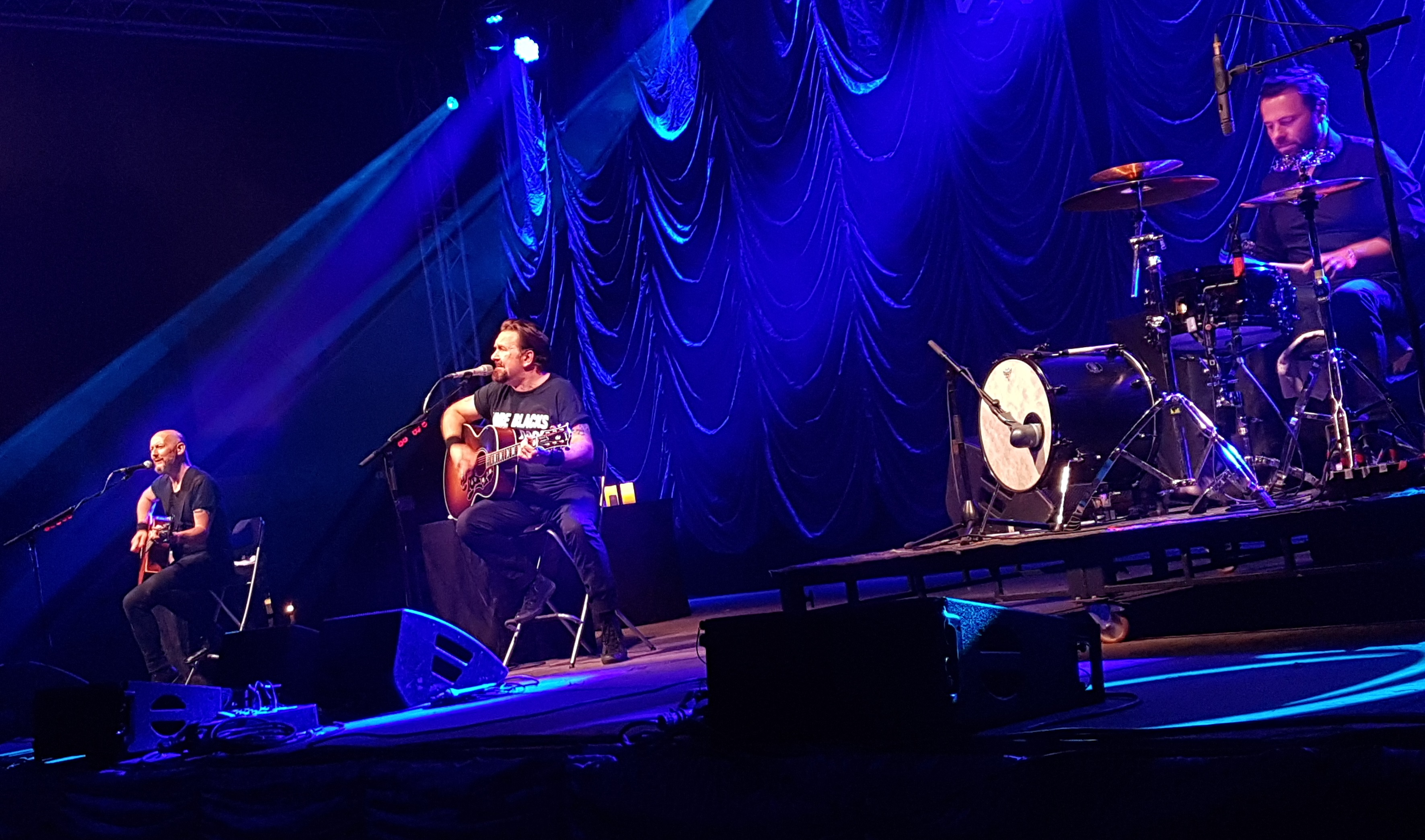
- Therapy? (L-R: Michael McKeegan, Andy Cairns, Neil Cooper) at Beautiful Days Festival in 2017
- Studio albums: 16
- EPs: 5
- Live albums: 2
- Compilation albums: 5
- Singles: 31
- Video albums: 2
- Music videos: 34

The discography of Therapy?, a Northern Irish alternative rock/metal band, consists of 16 studio albums, two live albums, five compilation albums (including a box-set), five extended plays, two video albums, 30 singles and 33 music videos. The list does not consist of any material released by band members with any other project, or any release not under the band name.

The band was formed in Larne, County Antrim in 1989 by Andy Cairns, Fyfe Ewing and Michael McKeegan. Following the releases of Babyteeth (1991) and Pleasure Death (1992) on Wiiija Records, Therapy? signed a deal with A&M Records and quickly produced their major label debut Nurse (1992). Its follow-up, Troublegum (1994), reached the top 5 of the UK Album Charts selling a million units worldwide. Ewing left the group following the release of Infernal Love (1995). With the addition of two new members Graham Hopkins and Martin McCarrick, Therapy? released Semi Detached (1998), their final album for A&M Records. Two more albums, Suicide Pact – You First (1999) and Shameless (2001) were released under the Ark21/Universal banner. Neil Cooper replaced Hopkins in 2002. High Anxiety (2003) was released on Spitfire Records, preceding the departure of McCarrick.

Seven studio albums have since been released as a three piece – Never Apologise Never Explain (2004), One Cure Fits All (2006), Crooked Timber (2009), A Brief Crack of Light (2012), Disquiet (2015), Cleave (2018) and Hard Cold Fire (2023). Therapy? is currently signed to Marshall Records.

== Albums ==
=== Studio albums ===
Year	Details	Peak chart positions										
Year	Details	IRL	UK	NL	BEL	GER	FRA	SWI	AUT	SWE	FIN	NZ
1991	Babyteeth: Released: 15 July 1991; Label: Wiiija Records; Formats: CD, LP, CS	—	—	—	—	—	—	—	—	—	—	—
1992	Pleasure Death: Released: 27 January 1992; Label: Wiiija Records; Formats: CD, LP, CS	—	52	—	—	—	—	—	—	—	—	—
1992	Nurse: Released: 2 November 1992; Label: A&M Records; Formats: CD, LP, CS	—	38	—	—	—	—	—	—	—	—	—
1994	Troublegum: Released: 7 February 1994; Label: A&M Records; Formats: CD, LP, CS	5	5	19	154	20	—	36	24	5	7	44
1995	Infernal Love: Released: 12 June 1995; Label: A&M Records; Formats: CD, LP, CS	5	9	33	5	20	—	40	21	12	10	48
1998	Semi Detached: Released: 30 March 1998; Label: A&M Records; Formats: CD, 6 x 7", CS	—	21	50	14	42	47	—	31	35	24	—
1999	Suicide Pact – You First: Released: 18 October 1999; Label: Ark21; Formats: CD, CS	—	61	—	44	—	—	—	—	—	—	—
2001	Shameless: Released: 3 September 2001; Label: Ark21; Formats: CD, CS	—	196	—	—	—	—	—	—	—	—	—
2003	High Anxiety: Released: 5 May 2003; Label: Spitfire Records; Formats: CD, CS	55	113	—	50	—	—	—	—	—	—	—
2004	Never Apologise Never Explain: Released: 27 September 2004; Label: Spitfire Records; Formats: CD	—	—	—	—	—	—	—	—	—	—	—
2006	One Cure Fits All: Released: 24 April 2006; Label: Spitfire Records; Formats: CD, DL	—	152	—	56	—	—	—	—	—	—	—
2009	Crooked Timber: Released: 23 March 2009; Label: Blast Records; Formats: CD, LP, DL	—	124	—	98	—	—	—	—	—	—	—
2012	A Brief Crack of Light: Released: 6 February 2012; Label: Blast Records; Formats: CD, LP, DL	93	99	—	—	—	—	—	—	—	—	—
2015	Disquiet: Released: 23 March 2015; Label: Amazing Records; Formats: CD, LP, DL	—	79	99	120	—	—	—	—	—	—	—
2018	Cleave: Released: 21 September 2018; Label: Marshall Records; Formats: CD, LP, LP, DL	31	43	—	76	—	—	—	—	—	—	—
2023	Hard Cold Fire: Released: 5 May 2023; Label: Marshall Records; Formats: CD, LP(x 6), CS, DL	48	29	—	14	—	—	—	—	—	—	—
Note: Irish Chart (IRL) listings on Chart-Track only includes Top 75 from the year 2000 to present.

=== Live albums ===
Year	Details
2010	We're Here to the End: Released: 5 November 2010; Label: Blast Records; Formats: 2CD
2017	Communion: Live at the Union Chapel: Released: 21 August 2017; Label: Self-released; Formats: 2CD

=== Compilation albums ===
Year	Details	Peak chart positions	
Year	Details	UK	BEL
1992	Caucasian Psychosis: Released: 13 April 1992; Label: Quarterstick Records; Formats: CD, LP, CS (US, CAN only)	—	—
2000	So Much for the Ten Year Plan: Released: 2 October 2000; Label: Ark21; Formats: CD, 2CD	111	10
2007	Music Through a Cheap Transistor: Released: 26 February 2007; Label: Universal Records; Formats: 2CD, DL	—	—
2013	The Gemil Box: Released: 18 November 2013; Label: Self Released; Formats: 7CD+1LP+1CS+1DVD	—	—
2014	Stories – The Singles Collection: Released: 14 April 2014; Label: Universal Records; Formats: CD	—	—
2020	Greatest Hits (The Abbey Road Session): Released: 6 March 2020; Label: Marshall Records; Formats: CD, LP	40	—

== Extended plays ==
Year	Details	Peak chart positions		
Year	Details	IRL	UK	SWE
1993	Shortsharpshock E.P.: Released: 8 March 1993; Label: A&M Records; Formats: CD, 7", 12", CS	2	9	22
1993	Face the Strange E.P.: Released: 1 June 1993; Label: A&M Records; Formats: CD, 7", 12", CS	5	18	—
1993	Born in a Crash: Released: 25 August 1993; Label: A&M Records; Formats: CD (EU only)	—	—	—
1993	Hats Off to the Insane: Released: 6 September 1993; Label: A&M Records; Formats: CD, CS (US, CAN, JPN only)	—	—	—

== Singles ==
List of singles, with selected chart positions, showing year released and album name
Title	Year	Peak chart positions							Album
Title	Year	IRL	UK	NED	BEL	FRA	SWE	FIN	Album
"Meat Abstract"	1990	—	—	—	—	—	—	—	Babyteeth
"Teethgrinder"	1992	19	30	—	—	—	—	—	Nurse
"Screamager"	1993	2	9	—	—	—	22	—	Troublegum
"Turn"	1993	5	18	—	—	—	—	—	Troublegum
"Opal Mantra"	1993	6	14	—	—	—	30	—	Non-album single
"Nowhere"	1994	6	18	—	—	43	—	—	Troublegum
"Trigger Inside"	1994	16	22	—	—	—	—	—	Troublegum
"Die Laughing"	1994	14	29	—	—	—	—	—	Troublegum
"Isolation"	1994	—	—	—	—	—	—	—	Troublegum
"Femtex"	1994	—	—	—	—	—	—	—	Troublegum
"Stories"	1995	15	14	—	—	—	—	—	Infernal Love
"Loose"	1995	23	25	—	—	—	—	—	Infernal Love
"Diane"	1995	20	26	10	5	30	8	14	Infernal Love
"Misery"	1995	—	—	—	—	—	—	—	Infernal Love
"Bad Mother"	1996	—	—	—	—	—	—	—	Infernal Love
"Church of Noise"	1998	—	29	—	—	—	—	—	Semi-Detached
"Lonely, Cryin', Only"	1998	—	32	—	—	—	—	—	Semi-Detached
"Hate Kill Destroy"	2000	—	—	—	—	—	—	—	Suicide Pact – You First
"Gimme Back My Brain"	2001	—	—^{[A]}	—	—	—	—	—	Shameless
"I Am the Money"	2001	—	84	—	—	—	—	—	Shameless
"If It Kills Me" / "Rust"	2003	—	76	—	—	—	—	—	High Anxiety
"My Voodoo Doll"	2003	—	—	—	—	—	—	—	High Anxiety
"Polar Bear" / "Rock You Monkeys"	2005	—	—	—	—	—	—	—	Never Apologise Never Explain
"Rain Hits Concrete"	2006	—	—	—	—	—	—	—	One Cure Fits All
"Crooked Timber"	2009	—	—	—	—	—	—	—	Crooked Timber
"Exiles"	2010	—	—	—	—	—	—	—	Crooked Timber
"Living in the Shadow of the Terrible Thing"	2012	—	—	—	—	—	—	—	A Brief Crack of Light
"Before You, with You, After You"	2012	—	—	—	—	—	—	—	A Brief Crack of Light
"Still Hurts"	2015	—	—	—	—	—	—	—	Disquiet
"Deathstimate"	2015	—	—	—	—	—	—	—	Disquiet
"Tides"	2016	—	—	—	—	—	—	—	Disquiet
"Callow"	2018	—	—	—	—	—	—	—	Cleave
"Wreck It Like Beckett"	2018	—	—	—	—	—	—	—	Cleave
"Joy"	2023	—	—	—	—	—	—	—	Hard Cold Fire
"Poundland of Hope and Glory"	2023	—	—	—	—	—	—	—	Hard Cold Fire
"—" denotes a recording that did not chart or was not released in that territory.

Notes

- A. "Gimme Back My Brain" was ineligible for the UK Singles Chart, but peaked at no. 6 on the UK Budget Albums Chart.

=== Demos ===
Year	Demo details	Track listing
1989	Thirty Seconds of Silence: Recorded: 8 April 1989 at Lisburn Road Studio, Belfast, Northern Ireland; Engineer: Colum Muinzer; Label: Not on label; Format: Cassette; Notes: Limited to 100 copies, sold at gigs. Picture sleeve.; Tracks later released on LP as part of The Gemil Box in 2013	1. "Bloody Blue"; 2. "Skyward"; 3. "Body O.D."; 4. "Beefheart/Albini"
1989	Meat Abstract: Recorded: 23 November 1989 at Active Studio, Banbridge, Northern Ireland; Engineer: unknown; Label: Not on label; Format: Cassette; Notes: Limited to 150 copies, sold at gigs. Picture sleeve.; Tracks later released on LP as part of The Gemil Box in 2013	1. "Multifuck"; 2. "Here Is…"; 3. "S.W.T."; 4. "Punishment Kiss"
1990	Dave Fanning Session: Recorded: 14 October 1990 at RTE 2FM Studios, Dublin, Ireland; Engineer: Paddy McBreen; Label: Not on label; Format: Cassette; Notes: Circulated by the band, non-general release. Picture sleeve.	1. "Reality Fuck"; 2. "Innocent X"; 3. "Body O.D."; 4. "Dancin' with Manson"
1990	(No Title) [aka The Michelin Tape]: Recorded: December 1990 at Homestead Studio, Randalstown, Northern Ireland; Engineer: Mudd Wallace; Label: Not on label; Format: Cassette; Notes: Circulated by the band, non-general release. Picture sleeve.; Tracks later mastered and released on the Babyteeth album	1. "Animal Bones (unmixed)" 2. "Skyward"; 3. "Loser Cop"; 4. "Innocent X"; 5. "Dancin' with Manson"
1998	Demo 1998: Recorded: 13 November 1998 at Maison Rouge, London, England; Engineer: Matt Simes; Label: Not on label; Format: CD; Notes: Used to gain record deal with Ark 21.; Tracks later released on LP as part of The Gemil Box in 2013	1. "Hate Kill Destroy"; 2. "Never Ending"; 3. "Ghost Train"; 4. "Other People's Misery"
2002	Demo 2002: Recorded: May 2002 at Fortress Studios, London, England; Engineer: Pete Bartlett; Label: Not on label; Format: CD; Notes: Used to gain record deal with Spitfire Records.; Tracks later released on LP as part of The Gemil Box in 2013	1. "If It Kills Me"; 2. "High Anxiety"; 3. "Hey Satan – You Rock"; 4. "Mama, You Can Call the Ambulance Now"

=== Promo singles ===
- "Nausea" (1992) US CD, CS
- "Perversonality" (1993) US CD
- "Screamager" (1993) US CD
- "Knives" (1994) US CD
- "Stay Happy" (1998) UK CD
- "Six Mile Water" (2000) Belgium CD
- "Bad Karma Follows You Around" (2000) CD
- "Rise Up (Make Yourself Well)" (2004) CD-R
- "Die Like a Motherfucker" (2004) CD-R
- "Long Distance" (2005) Belgium CD-R
- "Perish the Thought" (2005) Belgium CD-R

=== Miscellaneous releases ===
- "Have a Merry Fucking Christmas" (1992) a 7" given away at Dublin & Belfast gigs
- "Live in Japan (Fan Club Edition)" (1994) a fan-club only cassette recorded live in Tokyo in October 1993
- "Official Fan Club 1996" (1996) a fan-club only CD recorded live in Arnhem in July 1995
- "Webgig" (2007) a live studio video/audio download, recorded in September 2006
- "Wood & Wire" (2016) an acoustic CD album recorded for exclusive sale on 'Wood & Wire' tour

=== Selected video appearances ===
- "Video Debacle #8" (1994) A&M Records US VHS promo with a live version of "Knives" filmed in late 1993
- "Harakiri No. 2" (1994) German VHS with live versions of "Trigger Inside" and "Screamager" filmed in Stuttgart in March 1994
- "Welt Turbojugend Tage" (2005) German DVD with live versions of "Meat Abstract", "Teethgrinder" and "Nowhere" filmed in Hamburg in May 2004
- "Westend Festival 2011" (2011) German DVD promo with live versions of "Stop It You're Killing Me" and "Nowhere" filmed in Dortmund in October 2011

== Video albums ==
Year	Details
2003	Scopophobia: Released: 20 October 2003; Label: Eagle Vision; Formats: DVD, DVD+CD
2007	Gold: The Videos: Released: 23 April 2007; Label: Universal Music; Formats: DVD

== Music videos ==
List of music videos, showing year released and director
Title	Year	Director(s)
"Teethgrinder"	1992	Jon Klein
"Nausea"	1992	Jon Klein
"Screamager"	1993	Jon Klein
"Turn"	1993	Julie Hermelin
"Opal Mantra"	1993	Benjamin Stokes
"Nowhere"	1993	Nico Beyer
"Trigger Inside"	1994	Mark Pellington
"Die Laughing"	1994	Matt Mahurin
"Isolation"	1994	Michelle Spillane
"Isolation"	1994	?
"Stories"	1995	Peter Christopherson
"Stories"	1995	Thomas Napper
"Loose"	1995	W.I.Z.
"Loose (Photek Remix)"	1995	W.I.Z.
"Diane"	1995	W.I.Z.
"Church of Noise"	1998	John Hillcoat
"Lonely, Cryin' Only"	1998	John Hillcoat
"Little Tongues First"	1999	Nigel Rolfe
"Bad Karma Follows You Around"	2000	?
"Gimme Back My Brain (live)"	2001	Mark Hauptman
"Gimme Back My Brain"	2001	?
"If It Kills Me"	2003	?
"Rise Up (Make Yourself Well)"	2004	?
"Rock You Monkeys"	2005	Andre Thyret
"Crooked Timber"	2009	Sitcom Soldiers
"Living in the Shadow of the Terrible Thing"	2011	Sitcom Soldiers
"Before You With You After You"	2012	Paul McKay
"Still Hurts"	2015	Sitcom Soldiers
"Deathstimate"	2015	Sitcom Soldiers
"Tides"	2016	Adam David Barker
"Callow"	2018	Sitcom Soldiers
"Kakistocracy"	2019	?
"Joy"	2023	Humble Films
"Poundland of Hope and Glory"	2023	Kasparas Vidunas
"Woe"	2023	Roni Abramowsky

== See also ==
- List of songs recorded by Therapy?
