= Greatest Hits (The Abbey Road Session) =

- Greatest Hits (2020 Versions)

Studio album by Therapy?
- Released: 13 March 2020
- Recorded: 8 November 2019
- Studio: Abbey Radio, London, England
- Genre: Alternative rock
- Label: Marshall
- Producer: Chris Sheldon

Therapy? chronology
| Cleave (2018) | Greatest Hits (The Abbey Road Session) (2020) | Hard Cold Fire (2023) |

Professional ratings
Review scores
| Source | Rating |
|---|---|
| The Irish Times | 3/5 stars |

Greatest Hits (The Abbey Road Session) is a live-in-studio album by the rock band Therapy?. It was released by Marshall Records on 13 March 2020. The 12 tracks, all re-recordings of UK Top 40 singles originally released between 1992 and 1998, were recorded on 8 November 2019 at Abbey Road Studios in London.

The album was released on black vinyl, translucent green vinyl and double CD. While initial pre-order physical copies carried the "Abbey Road" subtitle, following an issue raised by the studio over naming rights, re-pressings and all digital copies were retitled Greatest Hits (2020 Versions).

The second part of the double CD release, entitled Official Bootleg 1990–2020, features 15 live songs (one to represent each studio album in the band's discography) recorded between 1990 and 2018, compiled from the band's personal archives.

== Track listing ==
All music is composed by Andy Cairns, except where noted.

Disc 1: Greatest Hits (The Abbey Road Session)
| No. | Title | Writer(s) | Length |
|---|---|---|---|
| 1. | "Teethgrinder" | Cairns, Ewing, McKeegan |
| 2. | "Screamager" | Cairns, Ewing, McKeegan |
| 3. | "Opal Mantra" | Cairns, Ewing, McKeegan |
| 4. | "Turn" | Cairns |
| 5. | "Nowhere" | Cairns |
| 6. | "Trigger Inside" | Cairns |
| 7. | "Die Laughing" (featuring James Dean Bradfield) | Cairns, Ewing, McKeegan |
| 8. | "Stories" | Cairns, McKeegan |
| 9. | "Loose" | Cairns |
| 10. | "Diane" | Grant Hart |
| 11. | "Church of Noise" | Cairns |
| 12. | "Lonely, Cryin', Only" | Cairns |

Disc 2: Official Bootleg 1990–2020
| No. | Title | Writer(s) | Length |
|---|---|---|---|
| 1. | "Loser Cop (Belfast, N. Ireland 20.06.90)" | Cairns, Ewing, McKeegan |
| 2. | "Skinning Pit (Vienna, Austria 17.04.92)" | Cairns, Ewing, McKeegan |
| 3. | "Perversonality (Osaka, Japan 11.10.93)" | Cairns, Ewing, McKeegan |
| 4. | "Brainsaw (New York, USA 11.05.94)" | Cairns |
| 5. | "Jude the Obscene (London, England 19.12.15)" | Cairns |
| 6. | "The Boy's Asleep (London, England 07.12.98)" | Cairns, McCarrick, McKeegan |
| 7. | "Big Cave In (Zurich, Switzerland 26.11.99)" | Cairns, McCarrick, McKeegan, Hopkins |
| 8. | "Body Bag Girl (Berlin, Germany 17.11.01)" | Cairns, McCarrick, McKeegan, Hopkins |
| 9. | "Nobody Here But Us (St. Gallen, Switzerland 29.06.03)" | Cairns, McCarrick, McKeegan, Cooper |
| 10. | "Long Distance (Werchter, Belgium 02.07.05)" | Cairns, McKeegan, Cooper |
| 11. | "Dopamine Seratonin Adrenaline (Lokeren, Belgium 04.08.06)" | Cairns, McKeegan, Cooper |
| 12. | "Bad Excuse For Daylight (Tilburg, Netherlands 04.11.09)" | Cairns, McKeegan, Cooper |
| 13. | "Before You, With You, After You (Dortmund, Germany 29.10.11)" | Cairns, McKeegan, Cooper |
| 14. | "Torment Sorrow Misery Strife (Utrecht, Netherlands 03.04.15)" | Cairns |
| 15. | "Crutch (Leuven, Belgium 23.10.18)" | Cairns |

== Personnel ==
Therapy?

- Andy Cairns – vocals, guitar
- Michael McKeegan – bass guitar
- Neil Cooper – drums

Additional musicians

- James Dean Bradfield – guitar, vocals on "Die Laughing"
- Fyfe Ewing – drums, vocals (CD 2, tracks 1–4)
- Graham Hopkins – drums (CD 2, tracks 6–8)
- Martin McCarrick – guitar (CD 2, tracks 6–9)

Production

- Chris Sheldon – producer, engineer

Artwork

- Nigel Rolfe – artwork

== Charts ==
Chart performance for Greatest Hits (The Abbey Road Session)
| Chart (2020) | Peak position |
|---|---|
| Scottish Albums (Official Charts) | 9 |
| UK Albums (Official Charts) | 40 |
