= So Much for the Ten Year Plan =

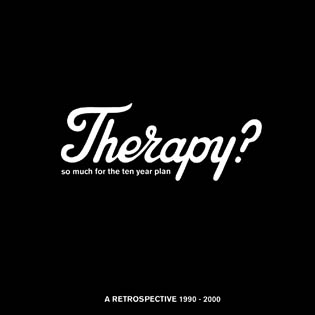

Compilation album by Therapy?
- Released: 2 October 2000; 3 October 2000 (US)
- Recorded: 1990–2000
- Genre: Alternative rock; alternative metal
- Length: 60:35
- Label: Ark 21 Records
- Producer: Harvey Birrell, Al Clay, Chris Sheldon, Mudd Wallace, Therapy?

Therapy? chronology
Suicide Pact – You First (1999)	So Much for the Ten Year Plan (2000)	Shameless (2001)

Professional ratings
Review scores
Source	Rating
AllMusic	4/5 stars
Pitchfork	6.5/10

So Much for the Ten Year Plan: A Retrospective 1990–2000 is a compilation album by the Northern Irish rock band Therapy? and the second to be released by Ark 21 Records. It was released on 2 October 2000 and allowed the band to fulfill some outstanding obligations to Universal Records. Two new tracks, "Bad Karma Follows You Around" and "Fat Camp", were specially recorded in May 2000 for inclusion on the album. The album reached number 111 in the UK Albums Chart.

The album was released on CD only. The UK limited edition contains a bonus disc with six tracks.

== Track listing ==
No.	Title	Originally from	Length
1.	"Screamager"	Shortsharpshock E.P.	2:41
2.	"Bad Karma Follows You Around"	Previously unreleased	4:07
3.	"Die Laughing"	Troublegum	2:48
4.	"Meat Abstract"	Babyteeth	3:47
5.	"Straight Life"	Semi-Detached	4:48
6.	"Teethgrinder"	Nurse	3:26
7.	"Fat Camp"	Previously unreleased	4:30
8.	"Stories"	Infernal Love	2:52
9.	"Nausea"	Nurse	3:56
10.	"Six Mile Water"	Suicide Pact – You First	6:20
11.	"Church of Noise"	Semi-Detached	3:06
12.	"He's Not that Kind of Girl"	Suicide Pact – You First	3:25
13.	"Diane" (Hüsker Dü cover)	Infernal Love	4:00
14.	"Nowhere"	Troublegum	2:27
15.	"Potato Junkie"	Pleasure Death	3:08
16.	"Ten Year Plan"	Suicide Pact – You First	5:14
Total length:			60:35

Japanese release bonus tracks
No.	Title	Originally from	Length
17.	"Evil Elvis"	"Die Laughing" single	2:21
18.	"Summer of Hate"	"Teethgrinder" single	2:28
Total length:			65:24

Bonus disc
No.	Title	Originally from	Length
1.	"Evil Elvis"	"Die Laughing" single	2:21
2.	"Bloody Blue (Original Demo)"	Thirty Seconds of Silence	1:11
3.	"Summer of Hate"	"Teethgrinder" single	2:28
4.	"Isolation (Consolidated Mix)"	"Isolation" single	4:38
5.	"Where Eagles Dare"	Violent World: A Tribute to the Misfits	2:27
6.	"Lunacy Booth (String Version)"	"Isolation" single	4:58
Total length:			18:05

== Single ==
- "Bad Karma Follows You Around" was released in 2000 as a promo only single with "Fat Camp"

== Promo video ==
- "Bad Karma Follows You Around"

== Personnel ==
Therapy?

- Andy Cairns – vocals, guitar
- Michael McKeegan – bass, backing vocals
- Graham Hopkins – drums, vocals (on tracks 2, 5, 7, 10, 11, 12, 16)
- Martin McCarrick – guitar, cello, vocals (on tracks 2, 5, 7, 8, 10, 11, 12, 13, 16)
- Fyfe Ewing – vocals, drums (on tracks 1, 3, 4, 6, 8, 9, 14, 15)

Technical

- Harvey Birrell – producer (on tracks 6, 9, 15)
- Al Clay – producer (on tracks 8 & 13)
- Head – producer (on tracks 2, 7, 10, 12, 16)
- Chris Sheldon – producer (on tracks 1, 3, 5, 11, 14)
- Mudd Wallace and Therapy? – producer (on track 4)
- Therapy?/Insect – design

== Charts ==
Chart (2000)	Peak position
Belgian Albums (Ultratop Flanders)	10
UK Albums (OCC)	111
