= Troublegum =

1994 studio album by Therapy?

Studio album by Therapy?
- Released: 7 February 1994
- Recorded: early to mid-1993
- Studios: Black Barn (Surrey); Livingstone, RAK, and The Church (London); Chipping Norton (Oxford)
- Genres: Alternative metal; alternative rock; punk metal
- Length: 45:37 (UK); 70:17 (JPN); 67:04 (US)
- Label: A&M
- Producer: Chris Sheldon

Therapy? chronology
Hats Off to the Insane (1993)	Troublegum (1994)	Infernal Love (1995)

Singles from Troublegum
- 1. "Nowhere" Released: 17 January 1994; 2. "Trigger Inside" Released: 28 February 1994; 3. "Die Laughing" Released: 30 May 1994; 4. "Isolation" Released: September 1994 (Germany); 5. "Femtex" Released: 1994 (US)

Troublegum is the fourth studio album by the Northern Irish rock band Therapy?, released on 7 February 1994 by A&M Records. The album features a more punk-oriented style after the success of "Screamager", and is compared to Stiff Little Fingers and the Undertones after the band's previous noise rock-influenced works. It was promoted with several singles, most of which received promo videos. Troublegum is the band's most successful album, selling over one million copies worldwide; Kerrang! rated it as the best album of 1994.

== Background and recording ==
On 8 March 1993, Therapy? released their first extended play, the Shortsharpshock E.P. It contains the track "Screamager", which was also released as a single the same day. "Screamager" diverged from the band's noise rock style to pop-punk, and was initially considered a "one-off". However, its success convinced them to record an album entirely in this vein. Frontman Andy Cairns cited Ulster punk bands such as Stiff Little Fingers, the Undertones and Rudi as influences.

Troublegum was recorded in 1993 at Chipping Norton Recording Studios in Oxfordshire, as well as RAK Studios and Church Studios, both in London. It's more melodic while retaining a metal sound. The album contains a cover of "Isolation" by Joy Division, which also became a single. The cover also incorporates elements from "Atrocity Exhibition"; both tracks are from Joy Division's album Closer.

== Releases ==
The album was released on 12-inch vinyl, CD and cassette. In the UK, the album was released on limited edition green 12-inch vinyl. There was also a green cassette, and the original CD copies had a green tray. A remastered CD version of the album was included in The Gemil Box, released in 2013. To celebrate the 20th anniversary of its original release, a three-disc deluxe edition version of Troublegum was released by Universal on 31 March 2014.

== Reception ==
Professional ratings
Review scores
Source	Rating
AllMusic	4.5/5 stars
Drowned in Sound	7/10
Entertainment Weekly	B
Los Angeles Times	3/4 stars
laut.de	5/5 stars
Louder Sound	4/5 stars
NME	8/10

Troublegum is considered to be Therapy? at their critical and commercial peak and has since sold over one million copies worldwide. The album reached number 5 in the UK Albums Chart and was certified gold in the UK in September 1994.

It was also nominated as album of the year by the Mercury Prize of 1994. The album was rated the top album of 1994 in the 1,000th issue of Kerrang! in 2004. The album was number 31 in Kerrang!'s 100 best British rock albums of all time. The album was shortlisted for the 1994 Mercury Music Prize.

== Track listing ==
Troublegum track listing
No.	Title	Writer(s)	Length
1.	"Knives"	Cairns	1:55
2.	"Screamager"	Cairns, McKeegan, Ewing	2:36
3.	"Hellbelly"	Cairns	3:21
4.	"Stop It You're Killing Me"	Cairns	3:50
5.	"Nowhere"	Cairns	2:26
6.	"Die Laughing"	Cairns, McKeegan, Ewing	2:48
7.	"Unbeliever"	Cairns	3:28
8.	"Trigger Inside"	Cairns	3:56
9.	"Lunacy Booth"	Cairns	3:55
10.	"Isolation" (Joy Division cover)	Ian Curtis, Bernard Sumner, Peter Hook, Stephen Morris	3:10
11.	"Turn"	Cairns, McKeegan, Ewing	3:49
12.	"Femtex"	Cairns	3:14
13.	"Unrequited"	Cairns	3:03
14.	"Brainsaw" (with hidden track "You Are My Sunshine")	Cairns, Jimmie Davis, Charles Mitchell	3:58
Total length:			45:37

US edition
No.	Title	Writer(s)	Length
14.	"Brainsaw" (with hidden track "You Are My Sunshine")	Cairns, Davis, Mitchell	25:23
Total length:			67:04

Japanese release bonus tracks
No.	Title	Writer(s)	Length
15.	"Pantopon Rose"	Cairns, McKeegan	2:19
16.	"You Are My Sunshine"	Davis, Mitchell	22:22
Total length:			70:17

Deluxe edition disc 2
No.	Title	Length
1.	"Pantopon Rose" (Nowhere single)	2:17
2.	"Breaking the Law" (Nowhere single)	3:27
3.	"CC Rider" (Nowhere single)	2:30
4.	"Nowhere (Sabres of Paradise Mix)" (Nowhere single)	7:46
5.	"Nowhere (Therapeutic Distortion Mix)" (Nowhere single)	5:50
6.	"Lunacy Booth (String Version)" (Isolation single)	4:58
7.	"Isolation (Consolidated Mix)" (Isolation single)	4:32
8.	"Isolation (Consolidated Synth Mix)" (Stories single)	4:41
9.	"Stop It You're Killing Me (Live at the Town & Country, Leeds 1994)" (Die Laughing single)	3:40
10.	"Trigger Inside (Live at the Town & Country, Leeds 1994)" (Die Laughing single)	4:05
11.	"Evil Elvis (The Lost Demo)" (Die Laughing single)	2:24
12.	"Die Laughing (David Holmes Mix 1)" (Die Laughing 12-inch single)	6:00
13.	"Die Laughing (David Holmes Mix 2)" (Die Laughing 12-inch single)	6:00
14.	"Nice 'N' Sleazy" (Trigger Inside single)	2:51
15.	"Reuters" (Trigger Inside single)	4:06
16.	"Tatty Seaside Town" (Trigger Inside single)	2:35
Total length:		68:00

Deluxe edition disc 3
No.	Title	Length
1.	"Trigger Inside (Psycho Amigo Instrumental)" (Trigger Inside 12-inch single)	5:08
2.	"Trigger Inside (Psycho Amigo Mix)" (Trigger Inside 12-inch single)	5:08
3.	"Knives (Kiddie Version)" (Knives US promo single)	1:56
4.	"Auto Surgery" (ShortSharpShock EP)	2:19
5.	"Totally Random Man" (ShortSharpShock EP)	2:21
6.	"Accelerator (New Version)" (ShortSharpShock EP)	2:16
7.	"Speedball" (Face the Strange EP)	2:31
8.	"Bloody Blue" (Face the Strange EP)	1:12
9.	"Neck Freak (New Version)" (Face the Strange EP)	4:57
10.	"Opal Mantra" (Opal Mantra EP)	2:27
11.	"Opal Mantra (Live at the Forum, London 1993)" (Opal Mantra 7-inch EP)	2:22
12.	"Innocent X (Live at Columbus Uni, New York 1993)" (Opal Mantra EP)	3:36
13.	"Potato Junkie (Live at CBGB's, New York 1993)" (Opal Mantra EP)	3:46
14.	"Nausea (Live at CBGB's, New York 1993)" (Opal Mantra EP)	3:29
15.	"Totally Random Man (Demo Version)" (previously unreleased)	2:36
16.	"Turn (Demo Version)" (previously unreleased)	3:15
17.	"Knives (Demo Version)" (previously unreleased)	2:03
18.	"Unbeliever (Demo Version)" (previously unreleased)	3:54
Total length:		55:00

Notes

- The European release does not contain the "You Are My Sunshine" cover.

== Personnel ==
Therapy?

- Andy Cairns – vocals, guitar
- Fyfe Ewing – drums, backing vocals
- Michael McKeegan – bass, backing vocals

with:

- Page Hamilton – lead guitar on "Unbeliever"
- Lesley Rankine – additional vocals on "Lunacy Booth"
- Martin McCarrick – cello on "Unrequited"
- Eileen Rose – additional vocals on "Femtex"

Technical

- Chris Sheldon – producer, engineer
- Darren Allison – engineer
- Nigel Rolfe – photography
- Stuart Smyth – photography
- Valerie Phillips – photography
- Jeremy Pearce – design
- Simon Carrington – design

== Singles ==
- "Screamager" – 11 March 1993, on the Shortsharpshock EP with "Auto Surgery", "Totally Random Man" and a re-recorded version of "Accelerator" from Nurse. This single reached number 9 in the UK Singles Chart, number 2 in the Irish Singles Chart and number 16 on Billboard's Modern Rock Tracks chart.
- "Turn" – 31 May 1993, on the Face the Strange EP with "Speedball", "Bloody Blue" and a re-recorded version of "Neck Freak" from Nurse. This single reached number 18 in the UK Singles Chart, and number 5 in the Irish Singles Chart.
- "Nowhere" – 17 January 1994, with "Pantopon Rose", "Breaking the Law" (Judas Priest), and "C. C. Rider" (Elvis Presley). A second CD was released on 24 January 1994, with two remixes of the title track, provided by the Sabres of Paradise. The single reached number 18 in the UK Singles Chart, and number 6 in the Irish Singles Chart.
- "Trigger Inside" – 28 February 1994, with "Nice 'n' Sleazy" (The Stranglers), "Reuters" (Wire), and "Tatty Seaside Town" (The Membranes). A remix 12-inch was released with two remixes of the title track, plus the two Sabres of Paradise remixes previously released on the single "Nowhere". This single reached number 22 in the UK Singles Chart, and number 16 in the Irish Singles Chart.
- "Die Laughing" – 30 May 1994, with "Stop It You're Killing Me" (live), "Trigger Inside" (live) and "Evil Elvis" (The Lost Demo). A remix 12-inch was released with two remixes of the title track, provided by David Holmes. This single reached number 29 in the UK Singles Chart, and number 16 in the Irish Singles Chart.
- "Isolation" (Joy Division) – 1994, with "Lunacy Booth" (string version) and "Isolation" (Consolidated mix). This single was a German only release.
- "Femtex" – 1994, with "Pantopon Rose". This was a coloured 7-inch released only in the US and limited to 500 copies.
- "Knives" – 1994, with "Knives" (kiddie version), "Pantopon Rose" and "Nowhere". This single was a US only promo release.

== Promo videos ==
- "Screamager": directed by Jon Klein
- "Turn": directed by Julie Hermelin
- "Nowhere": directed by Nico Beyer
- "Trigger Inside": directed by ?
- "Die Laughing": directed by Matt Mahurin
- "Isolation": directed by Michelle Spillane (version 1)
- "Isolation": directed by ? (version 2)

== Charts ==
Chart (1994)	Peak position
Austrian Albums (Ö3 Austria)	21
Belgian Albums (Ultratop Flanders)	154
Belgian Albums (Ultratop Wallonia)	117
Dutch Albums (Album Top 100)	19
German Albums (Offizielle Top 100)	20
Ireland Albums (IRMA)	5
New Zealand Albums (RMNZ)	44
Scottish Albums (Official Charts)	29
Swedish Albums (Sverigetopplistan)	5
Swiss Albums (Schweizer Hitparade)	36
UK Albums (OCC)	5
