= Semi-detached (disambiguation) =

Semi-detached housing consists of pairs of houses built side by side.

Semi-detached may also refer to:

- Semi-Detached (album), an album by Therapy?
- "Semi-Detached" (Law & Order: Criminal Intent), an episode of Law & Order: Criminal Intent
- Semi-Detached (play), a play by David Turner
- Semi-Detached, autobiography of Griff Rhys Jones
- Semi-Detached, a 2019 British sitcom starring Lee Mack
- Semidetached binary star system
