= Infernal Love =

Studio album by Therapy?
- Released: 12 June 1995
- Recorded: January–March 1995
- Studios: Real World Studios, Box, Wiltshire, England
- Genres: Alternative rock; alternative metal
- Length: 48:44; 50:22 (JAP)
- Label: A&M
- Producer: Al Clay

Therapy? chronology
Troublegum (1994)	Infernal Love (1995)	Semi-Detached (1998)

Singles from Infernal Love
- 1. "Stories" Released: 22 May 1995; 2. "Loose" Released: 17 July 1995; 3. "Diane" Released: 6 November 1995; 4. "Misery" Released: December 1995 (US); 5. "Bad Mother" Released: May 1996 (Belgium)

Professional ratings
Review scores
Source	Rating
AllMusic	3.5/5 stars
Punknews	4/5 stars
Q Magazine	5/5 stars
Kerrang!	5/5 stars
Metal Hammer	2/5 stars
Raw	4.5/5 stars

Infernal Love is the fifth album by the Northern Ireland rock band Therapy? Their third album on a major label, it was released on 12 June 1995 on A&M Records. The album was recorded at Real World Studios in Box, Wiltshire from January to March 1995.

== Background ==
The album was a major shift in direction from previous album Troublegum, moving away from punk-metal to create a broad epic cinematic soundscape with a strong melodic and rock grounding, with the songs being linked by ambient music pieces from DJ David Holmes. The album also contains a vocals-and-cellos version of "Diane" by American punk band Hüsker Dü, which also became a single. The cellist, Martin McCarrick, later joined Therapy? for several albums.

It was the final album to feature the original three-piece line-up, as drummer Fyfe Ewing departed in January 1996 following the European leg of the Infernal Love tour. The album reached number 9 in the UK Albums Chart and was certified Silver in the UK. It was also certified gold in Belgium.

== Releases ==
The album was originally released on limited edition red 12" vinyl, CD and Cassette. The Japanese release did not feature the "insanity" links by David Holmes, but included two bonus tracks. A remastered CD version of the album by Harvey Birrell was included in The Gemil Box, released on 18 November 2013. A two-disc Deluxe Edition version of Infernal Love was released by Universal Music on 31 March 2014.

== Sonisphere Festival ==
The band performed this album in its entirety at Sonisphere 2014.

== Track listing ==
No.	Title	Writer(s)	Length
1.	"Epilepsy"	Cairns	3:50
2.	"Stories"	Cairns, McKeegan	3:11
3.	"A Moment of Clarity"	Cairns	6:02
4.	"Jude the Obscene"	Cairns	3:32
5.	"Bowels of Love"	Cairns	2:53
6.	"Misery"	Cairns	3:40
7.	"Bad Mother"	Cairns, McCarrick	5:46
8.	"Me Vs You"	Cairns	6:24
9.	"Loose"	Cairns	3:00
10.	"Diane" (Hüsker Dü cover)	Grant Hart	5:00
11.	"30 Seconds"	Cairns	5:25
Total length:			48:44

Japanese release bonus tracks
No.	Title	Writer(s)	Length
12.	"Misery" (Acoustic Version)	Cairns	3:10
13.	"Isolation" (Consolidated Synth Mix)	Curtis/Sumner/Hook/Morris	4:41
Total length:			50:22

Deluxe edition disc 2
No.	Title	Length
1.	"Misery (Acoustic Version)" (Diane single)
2.	"Die Laughing (Acoustic Version)" (Diane single)
3.	"Screamager (Acoustic Version)" (Diane single)
4.	"Jude the Obscene (Acoustic Version)" (Diane single)
5.	"Loose (Acoustic Version)" (Diane single)
6.	"30 Seconds (Acoustic Version)" (Diane single)
7.	"Our Love Must Die" (Loose single)
8.	"Nice Guys" (Loose single)
9.	"Loose (Photek Remix)" (Loose single)
10.	"Die Laughing (Live)" (Loose single)
11.	"Nowhere (Live)" (Loose single)
12.	"Unbeliever (Live)" (Loose single)
13.	"Knives (Live)" (Misery US promo single)
14.	"Stories (Live)" (Misery US promo single)
15.	"Innocent X (Remix)" (Split single with Orbital)
16.	"Disgracelands (Acoustic Version)" (Bad Mother single)
17.	"Diane (Acoustic Version)" (Bad Mother single)
18.	"Opal Mantra (Acoustic Version)" (Bad Mother single)
Total length:		78:00

== Personnel ==
Therapy?

- Andy Cairns – vocals, guitar
- Fyfe Ewing – drums, percussion, backing vocals
- Michael McKeegan – bass, backing vocals, guitar on "Bowels of Love"

with:

- Martin McCarrick – cello
- Simon Clarke – saxophone

Technical

- Al Clay – backing vocals, producer, engineer
- David Holmes – "Insanity" (as listed in the booklet)
- Anton Corbijn – photography
- Lewis Mulatero – photography
- Jeremy Pearce – design
- Simon Carrington – design

== Singles ==
- "Stories" was released on 22 May 1995 with "Stories" (Cello Version) and "Isolation" (Consolidated Synth Mix). This single reached number 14 in the UK Singles Chart, and number 15 in the Irish Singles Chart.
- "Loose" was released on 17 July 1995 with "Our Love Must Die", "Nice Guy" and "Loose" (Photek Remix). This single reached number 25 in the UK Singles Chart, and number 23 in the Irish Singles Chart. A digipack was released on 31 July 1995 with "Die Laughing" (live), "Nowhere" (live) and "Unbeliever" (live). The digipak charted at number 141 in the UK Singles Chart.
- "Diane" was released on 6 November 1995 with "Misery" (Acoustic), "Die Laughing" (Acoustic), "Screamager" (Acoustic). A velvet digipack was released with "Jude the Obscene" (Acoustic), "Loose" (Acoustic), "30 Seconds" (Acoustic). This single reached number 26 in the UK Singles Chart, and number 20 in the Irish Singles Chart.
- "Misery" was released as a radio single in the US on 11 November 1995 with "Evil Elvis" (The Lost Demo), "Knives" (live), "Stories" (live), "Isolation" (Consolidated mix).
- "Stories" was re-released in the Netherlands in 1996 with "Loose" (live), "A Moment of Clarity" (live), "Our Love Must Die" (live). Live tracks recorded on 14 July 1995 in Arnhem, the Netherlands.
- "Bad Mother" was released in Belgium in 1996 with "Disgracelands" (Acoustic Version), "Diane" (Acoustic Version), "Opal Mantra" (Acoustic Version).

== Accolades ==
- Included in Q Magazine's 50 Best Albums of 1995 (February 1996 issue).
- Number 100 in Kerrang's 100 Best British Rock Albums ever!

== Charts ==
Chart (1995)	Peak position
Austrian Albums (Ö3 Austria)	21
Belgian Albums (Ultratop Flanders)	5
Belgian Albums (Ultratop Wallonia)	12
Dutch Albums (Album Top 100)	33
Finnish Albums (Suomen virallinen lista)	10
German Albums (Offizielle Top 100)	20
Ireland Albums (IRMA)	5
New Zealand Albums (RMNZ)	48
Scottish Albums (Official Charts)	15
Swedish Albums (Sverigetopplistan)	12
Swiss Albums (Schweizer Hitparade)	40
UK Albums (OCC)	9

== Certifications ==
Certifications and sales for Infernal Love
Region	Certification	Certified units/sales
Belgium (BRMA)	Gold	25,000^{*}
United Kingdom (BPI)	Silver	60,000^{^}
^{*} Sales figures based on certification alone.^{^} Shipments figures based on certification alone.
