= Turn (Therapy? song) =

1993 single by Therapy?

Single by Therapy?

from the EP Face the Strange and Troublegum
- Released: 1 June 1993
- Genre: Alternative metal
- Length: 3:49
- Label: A&M
- Songwriters: Andy Cairns; Michael McKeegan; Fyfe Ewing
- Producer: Chris Sheldon

Therapy? singles chronology
"Screamager" (1993)	"Turn" (1993)	"Opal Mantra" (1993)

"Turn" is a song by Northern Irish rock band Therapy?, released on 1 June 1993 from their second EP Face the Strange as the lead single. It is also featured on their fourth and second major label album Troublegum (1994).

== Background ==
Andy Cairns said about composing the song, "I was trying to write something like early period R.E.M., of which I'm a huge fan; Reckoning, and Murmur. I'd come up with this little riff. We'd built it into a big huge chorus on top." A particular line from the song, "turn and face the strange", was taken from the title of a chapter in the book Storming Heaven: LSD and the American Dream by Jay Stevens, which Cairns had been reading. Neither Cairns nor Michael McKeegan were aware at the time that the lyric had already been used in "Changes" by David Bowie.

== Charts ==
Chart (1993)	Peak position
Ireland (IRMA)	5
UK Singles (Official Charts)	18
