= Face the Strange =

1993 EP by Therapy?

EP by Therapy?
- Released: 1 June 1993
- Studio: Livingstone (London, England)
- Length: 12:51
- Label: A&M
- Producer: Chris Sheldon, Therapy?

Therapy? chronology
Shortsharpshock E.P. (1993)	Face the Strange (1993)	Opal Mantra (1993)

Face the Strange is an extended play (EP) by Northern Irish rock band Therapy?, released on 1 June 1993 through A&M Records. The EP reached number 18 on the UK Singles Chart and number five on the Irish Singles Chart. The lead track, "Turn", is included on Therapy?'s second major-label album, Troublegum (1994). "Turn" and "Speedball" are also included on the Hats Off to the Insane mini-album released in North America, while all four tracks appear on the Japanese release. All four tracks also appear on the Born in a Crash mini-album released in Europe. "Neck Freak" is a re-recording, different from the version on Nurse.

The EP's title comes from the chorus of the lead track ("Turn and face the strange")—a reference to the David Bowie song "Changes". It was released on 7-inch vinyl, limited-edition white 7-inch vinyl, 12-inch vinyl, CD digipak, and cassette.

== Track listing ==
No.	Title	Length
1.	"Turn"	3:56
2.	"Speedball"	2:36
3.	"Bloody Blue"	1:17
4.	"Neck Freak"	5:02

== Personnel ==
- Andy Cairns – vocals, guitar
- Fyfe Ewing – drums
- Michael McKeegan – bass
- Chris Sheldon and Therapy? – production
- Simon Fowler – photography
- Karjeanng – photography

== Charts ==
Chart (1993)	Peak position
Europe (Eurochart Hot 100)	45
Ireland (IRMA)	5
UK Singles (OCC)	18
