= Shortsharpshock E.P. =

1993 EP by Therapy?

Shortsharpshock EP

EP by Therapy?
- Released: 8 March 1993
- Studios: Black Barn (Surrey, England)
- Length: 9:40
- Label: A&M
- Producer: Chris Sheldon

Therapy? chronology
Teethgrinder (1992)	Shortsharpshock EP (1993)	Face the Strange EP (1993)

Shortsharpshock is the first extended play (EP) released by Northern Irish rock band Therapy?. It was released on 8 March 1993 through A&M Records, reaching number nine on the UK Singles Chart and number 22 on the Irish Singles Chart. Its lead track is "Screamager", which peaked at number 16 on the US Billboard Modern Rock Tracks chart.

The first three tracks on the EP appear on the Hats Off to the Insane mini-album released in North America and Japan. "Screamager" features on the 1994 album Troublegum. "Accelerator" is a re-recording, different from the version on Nurse. The EP was released on 7-inch vinyl, limited edition pink 7-inch vinyl, 12-inch vinyl, CD digipak, and cassette (packaged in a flip-top box styled like a cigarette pack).

== Track listing ==
Shortsharpshock E.P. track listing
No.	Title	Length
1.	"Screamager"	2:43
2.	"Auto Surgery"	2:23
3.	"Totally Random Man"	2:23
4.	"Accelerator"	2:11

== Personnel ==
- Andy Cairns – vocals, guitar
- Fyfe Ewing – vocals, drums
- Michael McKeegan – bass
- Chris Sheldon – producer

== Charts ==
Weekly chart performance for Shortsharpshock E.P.
Chart (1993)	Peak position
Europe (Eurochart Hot 100)	40
Ireland (IRMA)	2
Portugal (AFP)	5
Sweden (Sverigetopplistan)	22
UK Singles (Official Charts)	9
US Modern Rock Tracks (Billboard) "Screamager"	16
