= Ground paintings =

Ground paintings are an art form native to Australia. They are created using various minerals to pigment plant material, which is then meticulously arranged by several people to form a picture of a historic event.

== Overview ==
The creation of a ground painting is a very social event. The picture itself depicts some specific historic ancestor, glorified to be a hero or monster. The ancestor is nearly always some kind of natural element, whether an animal or force of nature. Since the pictures are innately tied to specific locations with specific ancestors, it very much ties the creators to each other and to the land, reinforcing the group identity. The creation of the ground painting and the accompanying dance is a performance tradition, analogous to oral tradition.

=== Art ===
The pigments used traditionally come from the natural resources: lime for white, ochre for yellow, clay for red, coal for black. With the introduction of a market economy, it is not uncommon to use acrylic paint for a ground painting. The emphasis is not on the materials or the form, but the meaning behind the picture as well as the accompanying performance. Nearly always, the participants paint on themselves as well.

The use of certain patterns to symbolize glowing, glittering power are usually limited to crosshatching and dots. In much of Oceanic art, these patterns symbolize an extra power. They are commonly seen on deity figures, the genitalia and thighs of women giving birth, and mythical creatures.

== Plagiarism of Oceanic art ==
Dreamtime and dreaming are common translations of a concept common in Oceanic culture that does not easily translate across cultures. Oceanic inhabitants tend to think of time as happening in two distinct forms: normal time and dreamtime. Normal time is linear, and is used for day-to-day activities. Dreamtime is a kind of surreal time that exists outside of ordinary time; all times and no time at all simultaneously. This kind of surrealism common to Oceania gained many admirers, notably Picasso and his peers in the Surrealist movement. However, many images from Oceanic art are copied directly from authentic Oceanic pieces and heralded as art. This plagiarism, as well as the commonly accepted but incorrect association between dreamtime and sleeping, has become a point of much controversy and anger from native Oceanic inhabitants.

== Sources ==
- Giant Woman and Lightning Man, J Isaacs: Dreamings.
