= Shameless (album) =

Studio album by Therapy?
- Released: 3 September 2001
- Recorded: January–February 2001
- Studio: Robert Lang (Seattle, Washington)
- Genre: Alternative rock, alternative metal
- Length: 41:40; 46:14 (JAP)
- Label: Ark 21 Records
- Producer: Jack Endino

Therapy? chronology
| So Much for the Ten Year Plan (2000) | Shameless (2001) | High Anxiety (2003) |

Singles from Shameless
- 1. "Gimme Back My Brain" Released: 6 August 2001; 2. "I Am the Money" Released: 17 September 2001

Professional ratings
Review scores
| Source | Rating |
|---|---|
| AllMusic | 3/5 stars |
| Blender | 3/5 stars |
| RTÉ | 3/5 stars |
| Stereo & Video | 3/5 stars |

Shameless is the sixth full-length album by the rock band Therapy?, and the third and final to be released on Ark 21 Records. It was released on 3 September 2001. The album was recorded at Bob Lang Studios in Seattle from January to February 2001.

Shameless is considered by the band to be a straightforward punk rock 'n' roll album with more 'tunes' than previous album Suicide Pact – You First, and reflects the no-nonsense trash-rock that they were listening to at the time. It was also the final album to feature drummer Graham Hopkins, who departed in December 2001. The limited edition CD-ROM included a live video of "Gimme Back My Brain", recorded at the Visions magazine party in Dortmund in June 2001. The album reached number 196 in the UK Albums Chart.

The album was released on CD and cassette.

== Track listing ==
All songs written by Therapy? except where noted.

| No. | Title | Length |
|---|---|---|
| 1. | "Gimme Back My Brain" | 2:37 |
| 2. | "Dance" | 4:03 |
| 3. | "This One's for You" | 3:45 |
| 4. | "I Am the Money" | 3:24 |
| 5. | "Wicked Man" | 3:48 |
| 6. | "Theme from Delorean" | 4:37 |
| 7. | "Joey" | 4:01 |
| 8. | "Endless Psychology" | 3:54 |
| 9. | "Alrite" | 2:31 |
| 10. | "Body Bag Girl" | 3:25 |
| 11. | "Tango Romeo" | 3:02 |
| 12. | "Stalk & Slash" | 2:24 |
| Total length: | | 41:40 |

Japanese release bonus tracks
| No. | Title | Length |
|---|---|---|
| 13. | "Denim Demon" (Turbonegro cover) | 2:14 |
| 14. | "Big Time" (Rudi cover) | 2:22 |
| Total length: | | 46:14 |

== Personnel ==
Therapy?

- Andy Cairns – vocals, guitar
- Graham Hopkins – drums, vocals
- Martin McCarrick – guitar, cello, vocals
- Michael McKeegan – bass, vocals

Guest musicians

- Rich Jones (The Black Halos) – guitar solo on "This One's for You", handclaps on "Endless Psychology"
- Rob Zgaljic (The Black Halos) – cowbell on "Gimme Back My Brain"
- Barrett Martin (Screaming Trees) – percussion on "I Am the Money", "Wicked Man", "Theme From DeLorean" and "Tango Romeo"
- Neil Fallon (Clutch) – compere on "Joey"
- Tim Sult (Clutch) – revving on "Joey", noise solo on "Endless Psychology"
- Jack Endino – additional guitar on "I Am the Money"

Production

- Produced, engineered and mixed by Jack Endino
- Recorded at Robert Lang Studios, Seattle, Washington
- Mixed at Hanzsek Studios, Seattle, Washington
- Pre-production at Private Radio Studios, Seattle, Washington
- Published by Warner Chappell
- Photography – Jasper James
- Design – Therapy?/Insect
- The album is dedicated to former RTÉ presenter Uaneen Fitzsimons and Brian Robertson.

== Singles ==
- "Gimme Back My Brain" was released 6 August 2001 on CD with "Gimme Gimme Gimme (A Man After Midnight)" (ABBA), "Gimme Danger" (The Stooges), "Gimme Nyquil All Night Long" (EC8OR) and on 7" with "Gimme Therapy", "Gimme Gimme Shock Treatment" (Ramones), "Gimme Gimme Gimme" (Black Flag). This single reached number 6 in the UK 'Budget' Albums Chart, due to the fact that it contained 7 different songs and was considered a mini-album.
- "I Am the Money" was released on 17 September 2001 on CD1 with "Tango Romeo (original demo)", "I Am the Money (full-length version)" and on CD2 with "Bad Karma (live)" and "Fat Camp II". This single reached number 84 in the UK Singles Chart.

== Non-album tracks ==
- "Denim Demon" originally by Turbonegro was released on the Japanese version of the album and also on the Turbonegro tribute album Alpha Motherfuckers.
- "Big Time" originally by Rudi was released on the Japanese version of the album and also on the 16-track European promo of the album.
- "B.S.F. (Blood Sucking Freaks)" originally by The Black Halos was intended for release as a split single with The Black Halos on Sub Pop, but the single was not released. The song remains unsurfaced.
- "Shameless" was an original song intended for release as a split single with The Black Halos on Sub Pop, but the single was not released. A re-recorded version called "Watch You Go" appeared on the High Anxiety album in 2003. The song in its original form finally surfaced in 2013 in The Gemil Box.
- "Valentines Day 2001" was an original song that mistakenly appeared on the 16-track European promo of the album, before officially surfacing in 2013 in The Gemil Box.
- "Gimme Back My Moog" was a short moog version of "Gimme Back My Brain" which was released in 2013 in The Gemil Box.

== Promo video ==
- "Gimme Back My Brain"
- "Gimme Back My Brain (Live in Dortmund)": directed by Paul Hauptmann
