= Fyfe Ewing =

- Born: Fyfe Alexander Ewing; 1 November 1970 (age 55); Larne, County Antrim, Northern Ireland
- Genres: Alternative metal Alternative rock Drum and bass
- Occupations: Record producer, musician, photographer
- Instruments: Vocals, drums
- Years active: 1989–present

Fyfe Alexander Ewing (born c. 1 November 1970), is a Northern Irish musician, best known as the original drummer and founding member of rock band Therapy?.

== Therapy? ==
In 1989, while playing drums in a punk covers band at a charity gig in Jordanstown, Ewing met Andy Cairns and subsequently formed Therapy? with Cairns on guitar and Michael McKeegan on bass. Ewing and Cairns would share lead vocal duties. In his near seven-year spell with the million selling outfit, Ewing recorded three full-length albums, two mini-albums and numerous EP's (as well as featuring heavily on two compilation albums and a box set following his departure) before leaving the band in January 1996. The official Therapy? press release stated:

"Therapy? have parted company with drummer Fyfe Ewing. The split is totally amicable, Ewing being unable to cope with the rigours of touring. With Therapy? about to embark on a 5 month US tour to coincide with the release of Infernal Love in America, a parting of ways was mutually agreed".

The song "Six Mile Water" on Therapy?'s 1999 album Suicide Pact - You First was partially written by Cairns about the end of his friendship with Ewing.

== Divers ==
Ewing had meanwhile moved from Belfast to Brighton, England. He played for a short time in a band called Divers, along with Rory Myers (guitar/vocals), Jon Hardy (bass) and for a short while Simon Robinson (Guitars), though Robinson proceeded to quit in early 1998, before Ewing drummed on and produced the three track EP Little Less Nothing, released on Track Records. Although the single received favourable reviews in the press, gaining 'Single of the Week' in Kerrang! magazine, Ewing left the band shortly afterwards. In 2006, Jon Hardy confirmed that Fyfe had recently jammed with the band but that it was just for fun, and not anything official.

== Score ==
In 2000, Ewing traveled to New York City to record an album with Brighton-based hard rock band Score. The band included Lee Malin (vocals), James O'Brien (guitar) and Carlos Fortin (bass). The album was produced by Fred Durst and mixed by Rick Rubin for Durst's Flawless Records. The album remains unreleased.

== Other ==
In 2007, Ewing placed a classified advert to the online musicians marketplace, Musolist, offering his services as a recording and/or touring drummer.

In 2008, Ewing travelled to Belfast to play drums on singer-songwriter Robyn G. Shiels new material. The long delayed album The Blood of the Innocents was finally released on No Dancing Records in April 2014.

In September 2011, Ginger of The Wildhearts confirmed that Ewing had agreed to drum on 10 tracks for his forthcoming triple album. 555% was released in February 2012. High quality photographs taken by Ewing during the recording process were later published in Rock Sound magazine.

In August 2016, UK indie label Wallcreeper Records uploaded a photo of Ewing preparing a new album with Steve Nolan, formally of Northern Irish band InDust. At the same time, a short electronic live album was uploaded to an official 'NolanEwing' Bandcamp page, recorded in London in 2003

On May 17, 2021 Ewing joined Nolan on his monthly Camp Radio Show with a guest mix.

== Movie soundtracks ==
In 1998, Ewing and co-writer Steve Nolan (formally of Northern Irish band In Dust) provided the score music for the Northern Irish short independent film Charming Celia, by director David Starkey, a comedy drama that was first broadcast on RTÉ television on 29 July 1998. In 2002, Ewing provided the score music for the UK short independent film Cry by horror director Steven Sheil. He followed this up with another short film, the documentary Love Takes by Jeanie Finlay. Although all these films lasted only 10 minutes each, Fyfe managed to showcase his drum n' bass talents in each.

More recently, Ewing, along with Steve Nolan, has written and performed bespoke music for the soundtrack of the IFC feature documentary movie Goth Cruise, again directed by Jeanie Finlay. The movie premiered on IFC (USA), 27 November 2008. The movie's website (now defunct) stated:

Bespoke music written and performed by Fyfe Ewing and Steve Nolan is suitably brooding".

== Discography ==
=== Therapy? Albums ===
- Babyteeth (1991)
- Pleasure Death (1992)
- Nurse (1992)
- Troublegum (1994)
- Infernal Love (1995)
- So Much For the Ten Year Plan: A Retrospective 1990–2000 (2000)
- Music Through A Cheap Transistor: The BBC Sessions (2007)

=== Therapy? Singles ===
- "Meat Abstract" (1990)
- "Teethgrinder" (1992)
- "Screamager" (1993)
- Shortsharpshock EP (1993)
- Face the Strange EP (1993)
- "Opal Mantra" (1993)
- "Nowhere" (1994)
- "Trigger Inside" (1994)
- "Die Laughing" (1994)
- "Isolation" (1994)
- "Femtex" (1994)
- "Stories" (1995)
- "Loose" (1995)
- "Diane" (1995)
- "Stories" (re-release) (1996)
- "Bad Mother" (1996)

=== Other Therapy? releases ===
- Thirty Seconds Of Silence (1989) – Demo tape
- Meat Abstract (1989) – Demo tape
- Caucasian Psychosis (1992) – a US compilation of the first two mini-albums
- "Have a Merry Fucking Christmas" (1992) – a 7" given away at Dublin and Belfast gigs
- Born in a Crash (1993) – a European only mini-album
- Hats Off to the Insane EP (1993) – a US and Japan only mini-album
- Live in Japan (Fan Club Edition) (1994) – a fan-club only cassette recorded live in Tokyo in October 1993
- Official Fan Club 1996 (1996) – a fan-club only CD recorded live in Arnhem in July 1995
- Scopophobia (2003) – a DVD release featuring promo video clips
- Gold (2007) – a DVD release featuring promo video clips
- The Gemil Box (2013) – a compilation box-set

=== Divers ===
- Little Less Nothing (1998 single)

=== Score ===
- unreleased album (2000)

=== Robyn G. Shiels ===
- Underneath The Night of Stars (2012 EP) – Track: "If Now is an Echo"
- The Blood of the Innocents (2014 album)

=== Ginger ===
- 555% (2012 triple album)

== Drum Kit ==
In Therapy?, Fyfe Ewing used a Sonor drum kit, Zildjian cymbals and Pearl Drums hardware. The following were his gig requirements:

- 1 Pearl rack system
- 6 Boom cymbal arms for rack
- 1 Tom arm for rack
- 1 Straight arm for a drum pad
- 2 Pearl snare stands
- 1 Drum stool with back support
- 1 Hi-hit stand
- 1 Bass drum pedal
- 1 14" timbale (with 14" Remo Ambassador batter head)
- 1 14x6" Snare drum (metal based only, not wooden) (with 14" Remo falam coated head)
- 1 13" Rack tom (with 13" Remo pinstripe head)
- 1 16" Floor tom (with 16" Remo pinstripe head)
- 1 18" Floor tom (with 18" Remo pinstripe head)
- 1 24" Bass drum (with 24" Remo pinstripe head)
- 1 Large drum carpet
- 1 Stage weight (for bass drum)
- 1 Fan
- 1 8 ft wide x 8 ft deep x 2 ft high drum riser
- 1 Zildjian set of 14" Newbeat hi-hats (or Quickbeat)
- 1 Zildjian 19" custom medium crash
- 1 Zildjian 19" rock crash
- 1 Zildjian 22" crash/ride
- 1 Zildjian 22" power ride
- 1 Zildjian 22" china boy low
