= Screamager =

1993 single by Therapy?

Single by Therapy?

from the EP Shortsharpshock E.P. and Troublegum
- Released: March 8, 1993
- Genre: Pop-punk; grunge
- Length: 2:36
- Label: A&M
- Songwriters: Andy Cairns; Michael McKeegan; Fyfe Ewing
- Producer: Chris Sheldon

Therapy? singles chronology
"Teethgrinder" (1992)	"Screamager" (1993)	"Turn" (1993)

"Screamager" is a song by Northern Irish rock band Therapy?, released on March 8, 1993 from their debut EP Shortsharpshock E.P. as the lead single. It is also featured on their fourth and second major label album Troublegum (1994). The song is considered to have propelled the band to fame.

== Background and recording ==
Andy Cairns wrote the riff of the song around age 16-17 on bass. It was used in the outro of Therapy?'s song "SWT" (standing for "Spide With Tache"), from an early demo by the band. Cairns had always thought the riff did not "go on enough".

One afternoon, Cairns and Michael McKeegan were watching television in a shared hotel room when they came across the Smash Hits Awards. McKeegan referred to the young girls in the audience who were screaming at Phillip Schofield and others onstage as "screamagers", which Cairns thought of as a title for a song.

In regard to recording the song, Cairns recalled:

I was into Ulster punk. Stuff like Stiff Little Fingers, The Undertones, Rudi. I came into the studio one day and said: "That riff we used to have… Let's turn that into the main riff and write a three-and-a-half-minute song that sounds like Ulster punk and a bit Ramones-y." We'd been a noisy rock band – people lumped us in with Big Black and Sonic Youth – so for us to come out with a melodic rock song was quite exciting. I remember playing it to friends who'd normally hate anything like that, and their reaction was really positive. So we played it, but it just sounded a bit generic, so we decided at the very start we'd do the "duh-duh-duh!", stop playing and let the drums carry the melody – which was our nod to Helmet. It has a classic format, but it's the little things: the stop-start intro, the double-time at the end… originally, Fyfe was playing this really bizarre Neil Peart, eight-bar fill, but Chris Sheldon told us: "Well, if you're going for classic Ulster punk, go straight in."

When Therapy? played the song for an A&R representative from A&M Records, he said "Oh, man… I don't think your fans will like it. Your fans like Nine Inch Nails, they don't like the Ramones.' They put a bit of money behind promotion, but not as much as they'd have done with other bands."

In 2019, McKeegan stated in an interview with Kerrang!:

"Screamager" was a case of just getting things a bit more direct, with the Helmet thing on the main chords. We loved Strap It On, and Meantime had just come out at that time, so it kind of made sense. But, the progression itself is a lot more melodic than maybe a Helmet track would have been. So it was a good happy medium, where we didn't just try to shoehorn a Helmet vibe onto what was a really good song. It kind of just toughened it up and made the chorus bigger and sweeter-sounding and also kept the grit in the verse, which is exactly what we wanted.

Therapy? planned the song to be a "one-off" and return to their noise rock style, but following the popularity of the song they decided to release more songs stylistically similar to that of "Screamager".

== Composition ==
"Screamager" is a pop-punk and grunge song. The lyrics have been described as "self-loathing". According to Andy Cairns, the song was about "getting away from any responsibility" and the only "autobiographical side of it" was the opening line, "With a face like this, I won't break any hearts".

== Critical reception ==
The song was praised by many music magazines, such as Metal Hammer and NME. Andy Kellman of AllMusic commented that "Metal-phobes can't help but give in to the irresistable [sic] pop-punk hook" of the song.

In September 2000, "Screamager" ranked at number 86 in Kerrang! magazine's "100 Greatest Riffs Ever" feature.

== Legacy ==
In 2009, MC Lars sampled the main riff and interpolated the chorus for his song "Hey There Ophelia" on This Gigantic Robot Kills, with Brent Anderson on vocals.

== Charts ==
Chart (1993)	Peak position
Ireland (IRMA)	2
Sweden (Sverigetopplistan)	22
UK Singles (Official Charts)	9
US Modern Rock Tracks (Billboard)	16
