= Lonely, Cryin', Only =

Single by Therapy?

from the album Semi-Detached
- Released: 18 May 1998
- Genre: Alternative rock, pop punk
- Label: A&M
- Songwriters: Cairns, McCarrick
- Producer: Chris Sheldon

Therapy? singles chronology
"Church of Noise" (1998)	"Lonely, Cryin', Only" (1998)	"Hate Kill Destroy" (2000)

"Lonely, Cryin', Only" is a song by rock band Therapy? and a single released on A&M Records on 18 May 1998. It is featured on the Semi-Detached album. This single reached number 32 in the UK Singles Chart.

The single was released on CD, CD digipak, and blue 7" vinyl.

== Track listing ==
=== CD ===
No.	Title	Length
1.	"Lonely, Cryin', Only"
2.	"High Noon" (originally by DJ Shadow)
3.	"Diane" (new recording)
4.	"Teethgrinder" (new recording)

=== CD digipak ===
No.	Title	Length
1.	"Lonely, Cryin', Only"
2.	"Kids Stuff"
3.	"Disgracelands" (new recording)
4.	"Lonely, Cryin', Only" (CD-ROM video)

=== 7" ===
No.	Title	Length
1.	"Lonely, Cryin', Only"
2.	"Skyward" (new recording)

== Personnel ==
- Andy Cairns: vocals/guitar
- Michael McKeegan: bass/backing vocals
- Martin McCarrick: guitar/backing vocals
- Graham Hopkins: drums/backing vocals
- Chris Sheldon: producer (title track)
- Matt Sime & Therapy?: producer (B-sides)
