= Church of Noise =

Single by Therapy?

from the album Semi-Detached
- Released: 2 March 1998
- Genre: Alternative rock
- Label: A&M Records
- Songwriter: Andy Cairns
- Producer: Chris Sheldon

Therapy? singles chronology
"Diane" (1995)	"Church of Noise" (1998)	"Lonely, Cryin', Only" (1998)

"Church of Noise" is a song by rock band Therapy?, released as a single on A&M Records on 2 March 1998. It is taken from the Semi-Detached album. This single reached number 29 in the UK Singles Chart.

The single was released on CD, red 7" vinyl and cassette.

== About ==
"Church of Noise" features a sample of the line ""It takes more than intellect to be a musician. Put your soul into it. OK?" from the 1962 horror film Carnival of Souls.

== Track listing ==
=== CD European version ===
No.	Title	Length
1.	"Church of Noise"
2.	"Church of Noise (Messenger Mix)"
3.	"Suing God"
4.	"60 Watt Bulb"

=== CD UK version ===
No.	Title	Length
1.	"Church of Noise"
2.	"Church of Noise (Messenger Mix)"
3.	"Suing God"
4.	"Church of Noise" (CD-ROM video)

=== 7" and cassette ===
No.	Title	Length
1.	"Church of Noise"
2.	"60 Watt Bulb"
3.	"Church of Noise (Messenger Mix)"

== Personnel ==
- Andy Cairns: vocals/guitar
- Michael McKeegan: bass guitar/backing vocals
- Martin McCarrick: guitar/backing vocals
- Graham Hopkins: drums/backing vocals
- Chris Sheldon: producer
