= Trigger Inside =

1994 single by Therapy?

Single by Therapy?

from the album Troublegum
- Released: 28 February 1994
- Genre: Punk metal
- Length: 4:00
- Label: A&M
- Songwriter(s): Andy Cairns
- Producer(s): Chris Sheldon

Therapy? singles chronology
"Nowhere" (1994)	"Trigger Inside" (1994)	"Die Laughing" (1994)

"Trigger Inside" is a song by Northern Irish rock band Therapy?, released as a single on 28 February 1994, through A&M Records. It is included on the band's second major-label album, Troublegum (1994). The single reached number 22 on the UK Singles Chart and number 16 on the Irish Singles Chart. The single was released on CD, CD digipak, 12-inch vinyl, yellow 7-inch vinyl, and cassette.

== Track listings ==
No.	Title	Length
1.	"Trigger Inside"	4:00
2.	"Nice N' Sleazy" (The Stranglers cover)	3:08
3.	"Reuters" (Wire cover)	4:20
4.	"Tatty Seaside Town" (The Membranes cover)	2:38

12-inch single

Side A
No.	Title	Length
1.	"Trigger Inside"	4:00
2.	"Trigger Inside" (Psycho Amigo Mix)	4:58
3.	"Trigger Inside" (Psycho Amigo Instrumental)	4:58

Side B
No.	Title	Length
1.	"Nice N' Sleazy" (The Stranglers cover)	3:08
2.	"Reuters" (Wire cover)	4:20
3.	"Tatty Seaside Town" (The Membranes cover)	2:38

== Personnel ==
- Andy Cairns: vocals, guitar
- Fyfe Ewing: drums
- Michael McKeegan: bass
- Chris Sheldon: producer on "Trigger Inside"
- John Robb: producer on "Nice N' Sleazy", "Reuters", "Tatty Seaside Town"
- Jonathan Barrett: engineer on "Nice N' Sleazy", "Reuters", "Tatty Seaside Town"

== Charts ==
Chart (1994)	Peak position
Europe (Eurochart Hot 100)	39
Ireland (IRMA)	16
Scotland (OCC)	43
UK Singles (OCC)	22
UK Airplay (Music Week)	39
