= Babyteeth (Therapy? album) =

Studio album by Therapy?
- Released: 15 July 1991
- Recorded: January 1990 and December 1990
- Studios: Homestead Studio, Randalstown, Northern Ireland
- Genres: Noise rock; alternative rock; alternative metal; Industrial Metal
- Length: 27:41
- Label: Wiiija Records
- Producer: Mudd Wallace

Therapy? chronology
Babyteeth (1991)	Pleasure Death (1992)

Professional ratings
Review scores
Source	Rating
AllMusic	2/5 stars

Babyteeth is the first mini-album by the Northern Irish rock band Therapy?, released on 15 July 1991 on Wiiija Records. Tracks 1 and 3 were recorded in January 1990, with the remaining tracks recorded over a two day period in December that year, all at Homestead Studio in Randalstown, Northern Ireland.

The album reached number 1 in both the UK and Irish Indie Charts.

== Release ==
The EP was first released by Wiiija on 12" vinyl. In 1993, Southern Records re-issued the album on 12" vinyl, limited edition red 12" vinyl, CD and Cassette. "Meat Abstract" was released on the band's own Multifuckingnational label as a 7" vinyl in July 1990. Promo videos were made for the tracks "Meat Abstract" and "Innocent X". Both were shot as part of Fyfe and some friends' media course on hi-8 film. The mini-album was collected, together with Pleasure Death, as the compilation Caucasian Psychosis in 1992.

== Samples ==
"Loser Cop"
Excerpt from "Loser Cop", from Therapy?'s debut EP Babyteeth

- The sample in "Meat Abstract" ("Wake up, time to die") is taken from the 1982 movie Blade Runner and is spoken by actor Brion James.
- The samples in "Loser Cop" are: "All we represent to them man, is somebody who needs a haircut" is taken from the 1969 movie Easy Rider and is spoken by actor Dennis Hopper, "You little punk" taken from the 1989 movie Drugstore Cowboy and "Good morning, you fascists, you pigs, you bigots, you pinkos, you fags, you bastards, fuzz. This indoctrination of vocal harassment was compiled by our own Juvenile Division is preparation for the concert this weekend" is taken from the 1973 movie Electra Glide In Blue and is spoken by actor Joe Samsil.
- A sample in "Innocent X" (at 2:25) is taken from the 1988 movie Dead Ringers and is spoken by actor Jeremy Irons, while the "My voice is nothing, my thoughts are nothing, in many respects I'm like you… nothing" sample is taken from the 1973 porn movie The Devil in Miss Jones and is spoken by actor John Clemens.
- The sample in "Dancin' With Manson" ("Take a knife on up the hill, lover, and kiss the girl goodbye") is taken from the 1978 movie Magic and is spoken by actor Anthony Hopkins.

== Miscellaneous ==
- "Meat Abstract" is named after a piece of art by British avant-garde artist Helen Chadwick. The noise at the beginning of the track is Fyfe Ewing drinking a can of beer in the vocal booth.
- "Innocent X" is named after a painting by Irish painter Francis Bacon. The breathing at the beginning of the track belongs to Michael McKeegan.
- Andy Cairns plays piano (un-credited) on "Loser Cop".
- The rear artwork is taken from a book called "Deep Red Horror Handbook" by Chas Balun, which was in turn a still-frame from the 1986 movie Combat Shock.

== Track listing ==
All tracks are written by Therapy?.

No.	Title	Length
1.	"Meat Abstract"	3:46
2.	"Skyward"	2:39
3.	"Punishment Kiss"	4:41
4.	"Animal Bones"	3:39
5.	"Loser Cop"	3:26
6.	"Innocent X"	4:00
7.	"Dancin' with Manson"	5:24
Total length:		27:41

== Personnel ==
- Andy Cairns – vocals, guitar
- Fyfe Ewing – vocals, drums
- Michael McKeegan – bass
