= Semi-Detached (album) =

1998 studio album by Therapy?

Studio album by Therapy?
- Released: 30 March 1998
- Recorded: 1997
- Studio: Homestead Studio, Randalstown, Northern Ireland; Chipping Norton Recording Studios, Oxford, England; Moles Studio, Bath, England; Metropolis Studios, London, England
- Genre: Alternative rock
- Length: 44:36; 52:50 (JAP)
- Label: A&M
- Producer: Chris Sheldon, Therapy?, Matt Sime

Therapy? chronology
Infernal Love (1995)	Semi-Detached (1998)	Suicide Pact – You First (1999)

Singles from Semi-Detached
- 1. "Church of Noise" Released: 2 March 1998; 2. "Lonely, Cryin', Only" Released: 18 May 1998

Professional ratings
Review scores
Source	Rating
AllMusic	3/5 stars

Semi-Detached is the fourth major label album by the rock band Therapy? Released on 30 March 1998 on A&M Records, it turned out to be their final album on the label. The album was recorded at various stages throughout 1997, including sessions at Chipping Norton Studios in Oxford, Homestead Studio in Randalstown, Moles Studio in Bath and Metropolis Studios in London. It was also the first Therapy? album recorded with Graham Hopkins and Martin McCarrick as full-time members. The album was not released in USA, but charted at number 21 in the UK Albums Chart.

The album was originally released on CD and Cassette, and as a limited edition box set of six 7" singles.

A remastered CD version of the album by Harvey Birrell was included in The Gemil Box, released on 18 November 2013.

The cover artwork is a reference to Happy Days, a play by Samuel Beckett, whose writings are often referenced in Therapy?'s music.

== Track listing ==
Semi-detached track listing
No.	Title	Writer(s)	Length
1.	"Church of Noise"	Cairns	3:06
2.	"Tightrope Walker"	Cairns, McCarrick, Hopkins	3:19
3.	"Black Eye, Purple Sky"	Cairns	3:11
4.	"Lonely, Cryin', Only"	Cairns, McCarrick	2:40
5.	"Born Too Soon"	Cairns	3:47
6.	"Stay Happy"	Cairns, McCarrick, McKeegan, Hopkins	3:54
7.	"Safe"	Cairns, McCarrick, McKeegan, Hopkins	4:02
8.	"Straight Life"	Cairns, McCarrick	4:47
9.	"Heaven's Gate"	Cairns	3:49
10.	"Don't Expect Roses"	Cairns, McCarrick, McKeegan, Hopkins	2:44
11.	"Tramline"	Cairns, McCarrick	4:52
12.	"The Boy's Asleep"	Cairns, McCarrick, McKeegan	4:26
Total length:			44:36

Japanese release bonus tracks
No.	Title	Writer(s)	Length
13.	"Suing God"	Cairns, McCarrick, McKeegan, Hopkins	3:50
14.	"60 Watt Bulb"	Cairns	4:24
Total length:			52:50

== Personnel ==
Therapy?

- Andy Cairns – vocals, guitar
- Graham Hopkins – drums, backing vocals
- Martin McCarrick – guitar, cello, vocals, piano
- Michael McKeegan – bass, backing vocals

Technical

- Chris Sheldon – producer, mixer, engineer
- Matt Sime – producer (track 11), additional engineering
- Andrew Catlin – photography
- Paul Davis – drawings
- Pearce & Wise – design

== Singles ==
- "Church of Noise" was released on 2 March 1998 with "Church of Noise" (Messenger Mix), "Suing God", "60 Watt Bulb". This single reached number 29 in the UK Singles Chart.
- "Lonely, Cryin', Only" was released on 18 May 1998 with "High Noon" (by DJ Shadow), "Diane" (New Recording), "Teethgrinder" (New Recording). A digipak CD was released with "Kids Stuff", "Disgracelands" (New Recording), "Lonely, Cryin', Only (Video)". A 7" vinyl was released with "Skyward" (New Recording). This single reached number 32 in the UK Singles Chart.
- "Stay Happy" was released as a radio only single in 1998.

== Promo videos ==
- "Church of Noise": directed by John Hillcoat
- "Lonely, Cryin', Only": directed by John Hillcoat

== Charts ==
Chart (1998)	Peak position
Austrian Albums (Ö3 Austria)	31
Belgian Albums (Ultratop Flanders)	14
Dutch Albums (Album Top 100)	50
Finnish Albums (Suomen virallinen lista)	24
German Albums (Offizielle Top 100)	42
Scottish Albums (OCC)	35
Swedish Albums (Sverigetopplistan)	35
UK Albums (OCC)	21
