= Nigel Rolfe =

British visual and performance artist (1950-) in Ireland

- Born: 1950 (age 75–76); Isle of Wight, United Kingdom
- Education: Farnham School of Art; Bath Academy of Art
- Known for: performance art, video art
- Movement: Contemporary art
- Spouse: Angela Rolfe
- Elected: Aosdána (2000)
- Website: www.greenonredgallery.com/nigel-rolfe

Nigel Rolfe (born 1950) is an English-born performance artist and video artist based in Ireland. He is a member of Aosdána, an elite association of Irish artists.

== Biography ==
Rolfe was born on the Isle of Wight in 1950. He studied at the Farnham School of Art and Bath Academy of Art.

== Career ==
Rolfe moved to Ireland in 1974, working at the Project Arts Centre. In the late 1970s, Rolfe became active in performance art. According to the Irish Museum of Modern Art, his work "encompasses installation, drawing, photography, video and audio media, and examines the influence of history on the individual and society." In the 1980s–90s he worked with the group Black Market International. In the 1980s, his work was mostly about The Troubles. In 1984, The Washington Post said, "He is a performance sculptor, whose speciality is creating ground paintings and hanging shrouds out of natural materials, such as flour and soot, and rolling his naked body in them until he has erased his creation or transferred it to himself."

In 1990, his work "Hand On Face" was shown at Nelson Mandela: An International Tribute for a Free South Africa. In 1991 he received funding from the American National Endowment for the Arts.

In 1989, he wrote a song for Christy Moore, "Middle of the Island," inspired by the death of Ann Lovett. In 1994, he worked with Moore, writing a song, "Tiles and Slabs," inspired by Brendan O'Donnell, a triple murderer from County Clare.

Rolfe received a retrospective at IMMA in 1994 and at the Musée d'Art Moderne de Paris in 1996. In 2000, he was elected to Aosdána.

As a performance artist, he cites Joseph Beuys, Pina Bausch and Marina Abramović as inspirations.

Rolfe has taught at the Royal College of Art, London, Chelsea School of Art and Design and the University of Pennsylvania.

== Personal life ==
Rolfe lives in Dublin. His wife, Angela, is an architect.
