= Die Laughing (song) =

Single by Therapy?

from the album Troublegum
- Released: 30 May 1994
- Genre: Punk metal
- Length: 2:51
- Label: A&M
- Songwriters: Andy Cairns, Fyfe Ewing, Michael McKeegan
- Producer: Chris Sheldon

Therapy? singles chronology
"Trigger Inside" (1994)	"Die Laughing" (1994)	"Stories" (1995)

"Die Laughing" is a song by rock band Therapy? released as a single on A&M Records on 30 May 1994. It is featured on the Troublegum album. The single reached number 29 in the UK Singles Chart, and number 14 in the Irish Singles Chart.

The single was released on CD, CD digipak, 12" vinyl, red 7" vinyl and cassette.

Therapy? performed this song live at the 1994 MTV Europe Music Awards in Berlin, And was supposed to be played at the 1994 Mercury Music Prize Awards in London.

== Track listing ==
No.	Title	Length
1.	"Die Laughing"	2:51
2.	"Stop It You're Killing Me" (Live)	3:40
3.	"Trigger Inside" (Live)	4:03
4.	"Evil Elvis" (The Lost Demo)	2:22

Live tracks recorded at the Town & Country Club, Leeds, England on 27 February 1994

12" single
No.	Title	Length
1.	"Die Laughing" (David Holmes Mix 1)	8:23
2.	"Die Laughing" (David Holmes Mix 2)	7:18

== Personnel ==
- Andy Cairns: vocals/guitar
- Fyfe Ewing: drums
- Michael McKeegan: bass
- Chris Sheldon: producer (Die Laughing & Evil Elvis)
- Chris Leckie: engineer (live tracks)
- David Holmes: additional production and remix
- Nigel Rolfe: photography
- Stuart Smyth: photography
- Jeremy Pearce: design
- Simon Carrington: design
