= Stories (Therapy? song) =

1995 single by Therapy?

Single by Therapy?

from the album Infernal Love
- B-side: "Isolation"
- Released: 22 May 1995
- Length: 3:12 (album version)
- Label: A&M
- Songwriters: Andrew James Cairns, Michael McKeegan
- Producer: Al Clay

Therapy? singles chronology
"Die Laughing" (1994)	"Stories" (1995)	"Loose" (1995)

"Stories" is a song by Northern Irish rock band Therapy?, released as a single on 22 May 1995 through A&M Records. The song is included on their fifth album, Infernal Love (1995). The single reached number 14 on the UK Singles Chart and number 15 in the Irish Singles Chart. The single was released on CD, orange 7-inch vinyl, and cassette.

== Track listing ==
No.	Title	Length
1.	"Stories"	2:38
2.	"Stories" (cello version)	2:41
3.	"Isolation" (Consolidated Synth mix)	4:42

== Personnel ==
Therapy?

- Andy Cairns – lead vocals, guitar
- Michael McKeegan – bass, backing vocals
- Fyfe Ewing – drums

Additional

- Simon Clarke – saxophone
- Martin McCarrick – cello (track 2)
- Al Clay – producer, engineer, mixer
- Mark Pistel – additional mixing ("Isolation")
- Philip Steir – additional mixing ("Isolation")
