= Nowhere (song) =

1994 single by Therapy?

Single by Therapy?

from the album Troublegum
- Released: 17 January 1994
- Genre: Pop-punk; punk metal; pop-metal
- Label: A&M
- Songwriter: Andy Cairns
- Producer: Chris Sheldon

Therapy? singles chronology
"Opal Mantra" (1993)	"Nowhere" (1994)	"Trigger Inside" (1994)

"Nowhere" is a song by Northern Irish rock band Therapy?, released as a single on 17 January 1994 through A&M Records. A remix CD was released a week later on 24 January 1994. The song is featured on the Troublegum album. The single reached number 18 on the UK Singles Chart, number six on the Irish Singles Chart, and number seven on the Finnish Singles Chart. The single was released on CD, CD digipak, CD remix, 7-inch vinyl and cassette.

== Music video ==
The accompanying music video for "Nowhere" was directed by German director Nico Beyer and produced by Chris Symes for Propaganda. It was released on 17 January 1994 and shot against the backdrop of New York's Flushing Meadow.

== Track listings ==
No.	Title	Length
1.	"Nowhere"	2:26
2.	"Pantopon Rose"	2:19
3.	"Breaking the Law" (Judas Priest cover)	3:29
4.	"C C Rider" (Elvis Presley cover)	2:32

CD remix

No.	Title	Length
1.	"Nowhere"	2:29
2.	"Nowhere" (Sabres of Paradise mix)	7:50
3.	"Nowhere" (Therapeutic Distortion mix)	5:49

European CD

No.	Title	Length
1.	"Nowhere"	2:28
2.	"Nice N' Sleazy" (The Stranglers cover)	3:08
3.	"Reuters" (Wire cover)	4:20
4.	"Tatty Seaside Town" (The Membranes cover)	2:39

== Personnel ==
- Andy Cairns: vocals/guitar
- Fyfe Ewing: drums
- Michael McKeegan: bass
- Chris Sheldon: engineer, producer, mixer
- Mudd Wallace and Therapy?: producer (CC Rider)
- Andrew Weatherall: additional production and remix
- Gary Burns: additional production and remix
- Jagz Kooner: additional production and remix
- Valerie Phillips: photography
- Jeremy Pearce: design
- Simon Carrington: design

== Charts ==
Chart (1994)	Peak position
Europe (Eurochart Hot 100)	36
Finland (Suomen virallinen lista)	7
France (SNEP)	43
Ireland (IRMA)	6
UK Singles (OCC)	18
UK Airplay (Music Week)	32
