= Opal Mantra =

1993 single by Therapy?

Single by Therapy?
- Released: 16 August 1993
- Studio: Livingston (London, England)
- Length: 2:29
- Label: A&M
- Songwriters: Andy Cairns; Fyfe Ewing; Michael McKeegan
- Producer: Chris Sheldon

Therapy? singles chronology
"Turn" (1993)	"Opal Mantra" (1993)	"Nowhere" (1994)

"Opal Mantra" is a song by Northern Irish rock band Therapy?, released as a single on 16 August 1993 through A&M Records. It was issued on clear 7-inch vinyl, blue 7-inch vinyl, CD digipak, CD, and cassette. It reached number 14 on the UK Singles Chart, number six on the Irish Singles Chart, and number 30 on the Swedish Singles Chart.

The single was backed by three live tracks on most formats in the UK and Ireland. The lead track did not appear on any Therapy? album but was included on the Hats Off to the Insane mini-album released in North America and Japan. All four tracks appear on the Born in a Crash mini-album released in Europe.

== Track listings ==
UK 7-inch, CD, and cassette single
No.	Title	Length
1.	"Opal Mantra" (studio version)	2:29
2.	"Innocent X" (live)	3:38
3.	"Potato Junkie" (live)	3:47
4.	"Nausea" (live)	3:29

European and Australian CD single
No.	Title	Length
1.	"Opal Mantra"	2:29
2.	"Turn"	3:50

== Personnel ==
- Andy Cairns – vocals, guitar
- Fyfe Ewing – drums
- Michael McKeegan – bass
- Chris Sheldon & Therapy? - producer
- John Mallison – assistant engineer and owner of aforementioned Opel Manta
- Chris Leckie – engineer on live tracks
- Lewis Mulatero – photography
- Simon Carrington – design
- Graham Tunna – design

== Charts ==
Chart (1993)	Peak position
Europe (Eurochart Hot 100)	40
Ireland (IRMA)	6
Sweden (Sverigetopplistan)	30
UK Singles (OCC)	13
