= Nurse (album) =

Studio album by Therapy?
- Released: 2 November 1992 (UK); 12 January 1993 (US)
- Recorded: 5–7 August 1992 at The Barn, Annamoe, Ireland (track 7); August 1992 at Loco Studio, Caerleon, Wales
- Genres: Alternative rock; alternative metal; noise rock
- Length: 40:28; 48:40 (JPN)
- Label: A&M
- Producer: Harvey Birrell

Therapy? chronology
| Caucasian Psychosis (1992) | Nurse (1992) | Born in a Crash (1993) |

Singles from Nurse
- 1. "Teethgrinder" Released: 19 October 1992

Professional ratings
Review scores
| Source | Rating |
|---|---|
| AllMusic | 3/5 stars |
| Robert Christgau | (3-star Honorable Mention) |
| The Encyclopedia of Popular Music | 3/5 stars |
| Entertainment Weekly | C |
| MusicHound Rock: The Essential Album Guide | 2.5/5 stars |

Nurse is the first major label album released by the rock band Therapy?, released in 1992 on A&M Records.

== Background ==
The album was written in a farm house in County Carlow, Ireland. It was mainly recorded at Loco Studio in Caerleon, Wales, apart from "Gone" which was recorded in Annamoe, Ireland. The album was rated favourably by critics and reached number 38 in the UK Albums Chart.

== Releases ==
The album was released on 12" vinyl, CD and cassette. In the US, the album was released on limited edition red 12" vinyl, CD and cassette.

A remastered CD version of the album by the original producer, Harvey Birrell, was included in The Gemil Box, released on 18 November 2013.

The original master of the album was used for a 'Music on Vinyl' audiophile re-issue, released on mixed red and gold 180g vinyl on 22 February 2016, limited to 1000 numbered copies It was also released on standard black vinyl release.

The first vinyl reissue featuring the 2013 remaster was released by Caroline Records on 12 June 2021 for Record Store Day in the UK and Ireland, on red vinyl and limited to 800 copies.

Furthermore, the album was reissued on 26 November 2021 by Caroline Records featuring the 2013 remaster on black vinyl and 2CD format. The CD version contains an extra disc of b-sides and previously unreleased demos.

== Critical reception ==
The Encyclopedia of Popular Music wrote that the album "featured more complex arrangements and themes than the punk-descended speed burn-outs of earlier releases." Trouser Press called the album an "unforgettable bomb blast of a record [that] fine-tunes the atmosphere of the first two EPs by adding a little more crunch to the low end."

== Track listing ==
All tracks are written by Therapy?.

| No. | Title | Length |
|---|---|---|
| 1. | "Nausea" | 3:56 |
| 2. | "Teethgrinder" | 3:26 |
| 3. | "Disgracelands" | 3:42 |
| 4. | "Accelerator" | 2:15 |
| 5. | "Neck Freak" | 5:51 |
| 6. | "Perversonality" | 3:52 |
| 7. | "Gone" | 6:23 |
| 8. | "Zipless" | 2:53 |
| 9. | "Deep Sleep" | 5:14 |
| 10. | "Hypermania" | 2:48 |
| Total length: | | 40:28 |

Japanese release bonus tracks
| No. | Title | Length |
|---|---|---|
| 11. | "Summer of Hate" | 2:29 |
| 12. | "Human Mechanism" | 3:31 |
| 13. | "Sky High McKay (E)" | 2:13 |
| Total length: | | 48:40 |

2021 Reissue Disc 2
| No. | Title | Length |
|---|---|---|
| 1. | "Summer of Hate" ("Teethgrinder" single) | 2:32 |
| 2. | "Human Mechanism" ("Teethgrinder" single) | 3:32 |
| 3. | "Sky High McKay (E)" ("Teethgrinder" single) | 2:14 |
| 4. | "Teethgrinder" ("Teethgrinder" single - Unsane Mix) | 6:33 |
| 5. | "Teethgrinder" ("Teethgrinder" single - Tee Hee Dub Mix) | 4:24 |
| 6. | "Nausea" (1992 demo) | 3:26 |
| 7. | "Teethgrinder" (1992 demo) | 3:30 |
| 8. | "Disgracelands" (1992 demo) | 3:36 |
| 9. | "Zipless" (1992 demo) | 2:59 |
| 10. | "Human Mechanism" (1992 demo) | 3:19 |
| 11. | "Accelerator" (1992 demo) | 2:14 |
| 12. | "Deep Sleep" (1992 demo) | 4:36 |
| 13. | "Hypermania" (1992 demo) | 2:41 |
| 14. | "Sky High McKay (E)" (1992 demo) | 2:14 |
| 15. | "Nausea" (Live from the Studio Floor) | 4:04 |
| 16. | "Summer of Hate" (Live from the Studio Floor) | 2:40 |
| 17. | "Neck Freak" (Live from the Studio Floor) | 5:33 |
| Total length: | | 59:59 |

== Personnel ==
Therapy?

- Andy Cairns – vocals, guitar
- Fyfe Ewing – vocals, drums
- Michael McKeegan – bass guitar

with:

- David James – cello on "Gone"

Technical

- Harvey Birrell – producer, live sound, samples
- Nick Atkins – engineer
- Andrew Catlin – photography
- Jeremy Pearce – design
- Simon Carrington – design

== Singles ==
- "Teethgrinder" was released on 19 October 1992 on CD and 12" with "Summer of Hate", "Human Mechanism" and "Sky High McKay(e)". A remix 12" was also released featuring "Teethgrinder" (Tee Hee Dub Mix) and "Teethgrinder" (Unsane Mix). The single reached number 30 in the UK Singles Chart and number 19 in the Irish Singles Chart.
- "Nausea" was released as a radio-only single in America in 1992 with "Teethgrinder" (Tee Hee Dub Mix).
- "Perversonality" was released as a radio-only single in America in 1993 with "Totally Random Man" (BBC version), "Neck Freak" (new recording) and "Bloody Blue".

== Promotional videos ==
- "Teethgrinder": directed by Jon Klein
- "Nausea": directed by Jon Klein

== Sampling ==
- The sample in "Nausea" ("Here I am motherfuckers!") is taken from the 1988 film Ghosts… of the Civil Dead and is spoken by Nick Cave.
- The sample in "Teethgrinder" ("He's losing his mind and he feels it going") is taken from a 1960s information film by the US Navy warning of the dangers of LSD, a section of which was later included in a BBC documentary called The Beyond Within. The sample was also used by the Canadian group Skinny Puppy near the beginning of the track "Convulsion" from Too Dark Park (1990).
- Other samples in "Teethgrinder" are taken from a TV documentary entitled American Conversations.

== Triva ==
The album cover is prominently on display in a Seinfeld episode, The Old Man, in the scenes in Bleeker Bob's record store. It can also be seen on a poster in the apartment of Rex and Pip, in the 1994 film Airheads.
