= Teethgrinder =

Single by Therapy?

from the album Nurse
- Released: 19 October 1992
- Genre: Industrial metal
- Label: A&M
- Songwriters: Andy Cairns, Fyfe Ewing, Michael McKeegan
- Producer: Harvey Birrell

Therapy? singles chronology
"Meat Abstract" (1990)	"Teethgrinder" (1992)	"Screamager" (1993)

Teethgrinder was a single released by rock band Therapy?, taken from their album Nurse (1992). It was released on 19 October 1992 through A&M Records. The single reached number 30 in the UK Singles Chart, and number 19 in the Irish Singles Chart.

It was available on 7", limited edition purple vinyl 7", CD, CD digipak, 12", and 12" remix. Both 12"s were also repackaged together as a limited edition presentation pack.

The song was featured in the PlayStation and Sega Saturn versions of video game Road Rash.

== Track listing ==
No.	Title	Length
1.	"Teethgrinder"	3:29
2.	"Summer of Hate"	2:30
3.	"Human Mechanism"	3:32
4.	"Sky High McKay(e)"	2:13

7"
No.	Title	Length
1.	"Teethgrinder"	3:29
2.	"Summer of Hate"	2:30

12" Remix
No.	Title	Length
1.	"Teethgrinder" (Tee Hee Dub Mix)	4:22
2.	"Teethgrinder" (Unsane Mix)	6:28

== Personnel ==
- Andy Cairns – vocals, guitar
- Fyfe Ewing – vocals, drums
- Michael McKeegan – bass
- Harvey Birrell – producer
- Andrew Catlin – photography
- Jeremy Pearce – design
