= Martin McCarrick =

English musician and composer

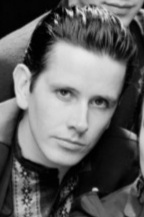
- McCarrick in 1988

Background information
- Born: 29 July 1962 (age 64); Luton, Bedfordshire, England
- Occupation: Musician
- Instruments: Keyboards; cello; guitar; dulcimer
- Formerly of: Siouxsie and the Banshees; Therapy?

Martin McCarrick (born 29 July 1962) is an English cellist, keyboardist, guitarist, arranger and composer, best known for being a member of Siouxsie and the Banshees for seven years, from 1987 until 1995. Aside from being a live and recording artist, he is also a teacher and visiting lecturer in music, currently teaching at Thomas Tallis School in Kidbrooke, London.

== Career ==
=== Marc Almond ===
His first recording in the pop-rock arena was on the 1983 Marc and the Mambas album Torment and Toreros, and he has since maintained an association with Marc Almond.

=== Siouxsie and the Banshees ===
He is known for his work with Siouxsie and the Banshees from 1987 until 1995. The band first hired him in 1984 for the strings arrangements on The Thorn. He was featured on the 1987 album Through the Looking Glass as a cello player and he also helped for the arrangements. He became a full-time member of the band and officially a Banshee in May 1987. Afterwards he recorded three full studio albums: Peepshow (1988), Superstition (1991) and The Rapture (1995). In 1991, the single "Kiss Them for Me" reached Number 23 on the Billboard Hot 100. With Siouxsie and the Banshees, he also contributed to the films Batman Returns, Showgirls, and, The Craft.

=== Other projects ===
McCarrick is also known for being part of 4AD records super group This Mortal Coil with whom he recorded three albums – It'll End in Tears (1984), Filigree & Shadow (1986), and Blood (1991). Alongside his work with This Mortal Coil he contributed to the recording and live performances of a number of 4AD acts including Dead Can Dance, The Wolfgang Press, Peter Murphy, Heidi Berry, Lush, Throwing Muses and Kristin Hersh.

He was an occasional guest with the Irish rock band Therapy? starting in 1992, with appearances on their albums Troublegum and Infernal Love, and sitting in for some live gigs and tours as a cellist and second guitarist. He eventually joined them full-time, with his first gig being a secret fan-club show in Dublin, Ireland on 10 April 1996. During the band's UK tour in 2003, McCarrick perforated his ear-drum and had to leave mid-tour. His last show with Therapy? was in Glasgow, Scotland on 28 November 2003. McCarrick left Therapy? in March 2004.

He has worked on and had music used for film, TV, radio and theatre. Film work includes The Garden and The Prey.

=== Collaborations ===
He has also been associated with other musicians, recording and performing with Nick Cave, The The, Gary Numan, Biffy Clyro, Marianne Faithful and Bryan Ferry. Plus, he has become the cellist of choice for British rock bands, appearing on stage with both 3 Colours Red and Rico (to whose Violent Silences album he contributed).

He and his wife, Kimberlee, a violinist, now work together as The McCarricks – a live audio visual performance based show. They have toured extensively in the UK, USA and Europe and have written music for Channel 4, Embarrassing Bodies and the Animal Rights Society of the USA.

In 2004, he performed again with Siouxsie on her Dreamshow performance, which featured a full orchestra and works from both her Siouxsie & the Bansheees as well as her the Creatures back catalogues.

In 2006 McCarrick (along with Kimberlee McCarrick) took part in Patti Smith's Meltdown festival at The Royal Festival Hall in London where they performed with Sinead O'Connor, Marianne Faithful and Kristin Hersh.

2007-8 saw violin and cello duo The McCarricks tour the UK, Europe and the US. Two EP releases followed – '3' and 'The McCarricks' – both on The McCarricks' own 'House of McCarrick' label.

In 2012, he was working (for the first time in almost 30 years) again with Marc Almond, for his performance of Almond's Torment and Toreros album from 1983 in its entirety, for the Meltdown 2012 festival. He was musical director for the string and choir sections and performed as well. He continues to work with Marc Almond and in 2013 teamed up with Marc and Tony Visconti to record new material.

== Selected appearances ==
- The Glove – Blue Sunshine (1983)
- Marc & the Mambas – Torment & Toreros
- Marc Almond – Vermin in Ermine (1984)
- This Mortal Coil – It'll End in Tears (1984)
- Siouxsie and the Banshees – The Thorn (EP) (1984)
- Bryan Ferry – Boys and Girls (1985)
- Marc Almond – Stories of Johnny (1985)
- Dead Can Dance – Spleen and Ideal (1985)
- The Wolfgang Press – Standing Up Straight (1986)
- This Mortal Coil – Filigree & Shadow (1986)
- Marc Almond – Mother Fist and Her Five Daughters (1987)
- Siouxsie and the Banshees – Through the Looking Glass (1987)
- Siouxsie and the Banshees – Peepshow (1988)
- The Creatures – Boomerang (1989)
- This Mortal Coil – Blood (1991)
- Siouxsie and the Banshees – Superstition (1991)
- Heidi Berry – Love (1991)
- Indigo Girls - Rites of Passage (1992)
- Lush – Split (1994)
- Kristin Hersh – Strings (1994)
- Therapy? – Troublegum (1994)
- Therapy? – Infernal Love (1995)
- Siouxsie and the Banshees – The Rapture (1995)
- Throwing Muses – Limbo (1996)
- Skunk Anansie – Stoosh (1996)
- Therapy? – Semi-Detached (1998)
- Therapy? – Suicide Pact - You First (1999)
- Therapy? – So Much For the Ten Year Plan (2000)
- Therapy? – Shameless (2001)
- Therapy? – High Anxiety (2003)
- Oceansize – Effloresce (2003)
- Biffy Clyro – The Vertigo of Bliss (2003)
- Rico – Violent Silences (2004)
- Siouxsie Sioux – Dreamshow (2005)
- Gary Numan – Jagged (2006)
- Kristin Hersh – Learn to Sing Like a Star (2007)
- Therapy? – Music Through a Cheap Transistor (2007)
