= Pitchshifter discography =

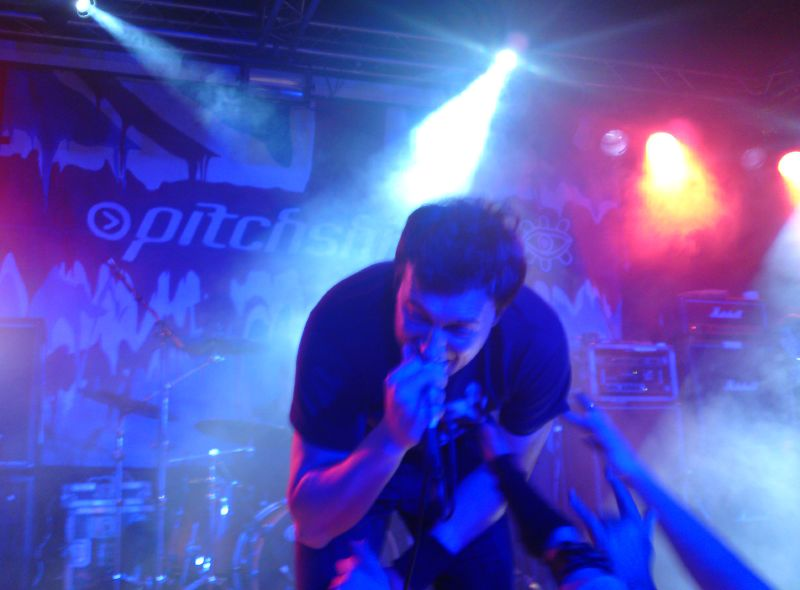
- Pitchshifter performing in 2006
- Studio albums: 6
- Extended plays: 4
- Live albums: 1
- Compilation albums: 1
- Singles: 14
- Video albums: 1
- Music videos: 7
- Remix albums: 2

This is a comprehensive discography of Pitchshifter, an industrial metal/rock band from the United Kingdom. The band have released six studio albums, four EPs, one live album, fourteen singles and one video album.

== Albums ==
=== Studio albums ===
List of studio albums, with selected chart positions, sales figures and certifications
Title	Album details	Peak chart positions		Sales
Title	Album details	UK	US Heat.	Sales
Industrial	Released: 1 January 1991; Label: Peaceville	—	—	
Desensitized	Released: 14 December 1993; Label: Earache	—	—	
Infotainment?	Released: 7 May 1996; Label: Earache	117	—	
www.pitchshifter.com	Released: 7 April 1998; Label: Geffen	115	—	US: 60,152
Deviant	Released: 23 May 2000; Label: MCA	35	39	US: 33,353
PSI	Released: 7 May 2002; Label: Sanctuary	54	—	
"—" denotes a recording that did not chart or was not released in that territory.

=== Extended plays ===
Year	Album details	Chart positions
Year	Album details	UK
1992	Submit: Released: 1992; Label: Earache; Format: CD	—
1999	Exploitainment: Released: 1999; Label: Earache; Format: CD	—
1999	Un-United Kingdom: Released: 1999; Label: Alternative Tentacles; Format: CD	148
2006	None for All and All for One: Released: 2006; Label: PSI; Format: CD	—
2020	Un-United Kingdom 20th Anniversary Brexit Edition: Released: 2020; Label: Self-released; Format: Digital	-
2020	EFKD 2020: Released: 2020; Label: Self-released; Format: Digital	—
"—" denotes a release that did not chart.

=== Remix albums ===
Year	Album details
1995	The Remix War: Released: 1995; Label: Earache; Format: CD
2003	Bootlegged, Distorted, Remixed and Uploaded: Released: 2003; Label: PSI; Format: CD

=== Compilation albums ===
Year	Album details
2003	Bootlegged, Distorted, Remixed and Uploaded: Released: 2003; Label: PSI; Format: CD

== Singles ==
List of singles, with selected chart positions and certifications, showing year released and album name
Title	Year	Peak chart positions	Album
Title	Year	UK	Album
"Death Industrial"	1991	—	Non-album single
"Deconstruction"	1992	—	Submit
"Triad"	1993	—	Desensitized
"Underacheiver"	1996	—	Infotainment?
"Genius"	1997	71	www.pitchshifter.com
"Microwaved"	1997	54	www.pitchshifter.com
"W.Y.S.I.W.Y.G."	1998	—	www.pitchshifter.com
"Condescension"	1999	—	Deviant
"Hidden Agenda"	1999	—	Deviant
"Keep It Clean"	1999	—	Deviant
"Dead Battery"	2000	71	Deviant
"Shutdown"	2001	66	PSI
"Eight Days"	2001	78	PSI
"Messiah"	2019	—	non-album single
"Apply Yourself"	2019	—	non-album single
"—" denotes a recording that did not chart or was not released in that territory.

== Video albums ==
Year	Video details
2004	P.S.I.entology: Released: 2004; Label: PSI; Format: DVD

== B-sides ==
- "N.I.B." (Black Sabbath cover, "Triad" single)
- "Floppy Disk" (Available on "Genius" single)
- "You Are Free (To Do As We Tell You)" (Available on "Genius" single)
- "Touch Me I'm Sick" (Mudhoney cover, available on "Dead Battery" single)
- "Voted Least Likely to Succeed" (Available on "Dead Battery" single)
- "Trancer" (Available on "Eight Days" single)
- "Messiah" (Available on the rare "Cohesion" CD)
- "St. Anger" (Metallica cover, available on "The Blackest Box - the Ultimate Metallica Tribute", featuring Logan Mader)
- "Making Plans for Nigel" XTC cover, available on "Genius" single)

== Music videos ==
List of music videos, with directors, showing year released
Title	Year	Director(s)
"Deconstruction"	1992	
"Genius"	1998	Ben & Joe Dempsey
"Hidden Agenda"	2000	Dose Productions (Sam Hayles)
"Dead Battery"	2000	
"Shutdown"	2002	Flynn Productions

== Other appearances ==
Year	Song	Title
1994	"Triad"	Brainscan
1998	"W.Y.S.I.W.Y.G"	Twisted Metal 3
1998	"Microwaved"	Twisted Metal 3
1998	"Innit"	Twisted Metal 3
1998	"Microwaved"	Test Drive 5
1998	"Genius"	Test Drive 5
1998	"W.Y.S.I.W.Y.G"	Test Drive 5
1997	"Genius"	Mortal Kombat: Annihilation
2000	"Everything Sucks (Again)"	The Crow: Salvation
2001	"Keep It Clean"	Ozzfest: Second Stage Live
2003	"Eight Days"	Paycheck (Trailer only)
2007	"Scene This"	MotorStorm
