= Rock City (venue) =

Music venue and nightclub located in England

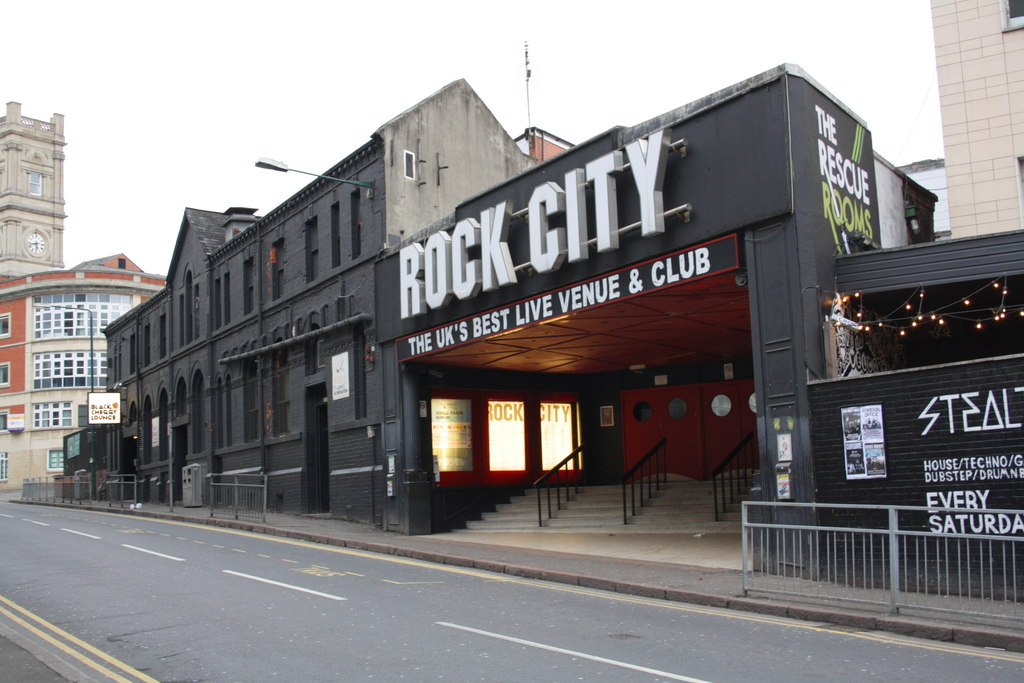
- The venue on Talbot Street
- Interactive map of Rock City
- Address: 8 Talbot Street
- Location: Nottingham, England
- Coordinates: 52.9561°N 1.1544°W
- Owner: DHP Family Ltd
- Seating type: Primarily standing, some seating
- Capacity: 2,000 (Rock City)
- Type: Music venue and Nightclub
- Event: Various

Construction
- Opened: 1980

Website
- rock-city.co.uk

Rock City is a music venue and nightclub located in Nottingham, England. It is owned by venue operator and concert promoter DHP Family.

It opened in December 1980, first hosting The Undertones, and has gone on to host some of the biggest names in music including Nirvana, Guns N’ Roses, David Bowie, Ramones and Oasis. It has received numerous awards, including Kerrang! magazine's Venue of the Year for ten consecutive years.

== Overview ==
Rock City is based in Nottingham City Centre, with a capacity of 2,000. The club features six bars spread across three rooms. The Main Hall and the Basement (Beta) rooms are all-standing during gigs. The third room, the Black Cherry Lounge, is operated separately (prior to September 2011 it was known as The Rig). Rock City plays host to various sized gigs, from smaller upcoming bands of the underground and local scene, to bands that are in the charts.

== History ==
=== Pre-Rock City and foundation ===
The building opened as the Alexandra Skating Rink on 23 November 1876 and was renamed Victoria Halls in 1887. It closed in May 1928 and the proprietor, Mr. Walker started a new venture with a new Palais de Danse which was opened in 1929 in Greyfriars Hall, Greyfriar Gate.

Prior to Rock City the building was called The Heart of the Midlands, which hosted variety acts as well as the inaugural World Professional Darts Championship in 1978. The building was taken over by Sammy Jackson, who already owned a club called the Retford Porterhouse where he had booked bands such as AC/DC and The Clash, along with George Akins Snr., a local bookmaker, who bankrolled the new venture. The club was managed by Paul Mason, who would go on to manage Manchester's Haçienda nightclub, and had Iron Maiden booked to be the band to open the venue, although unfinished electrics resulted in the gig being cancelled. As a result, Orange Juice became the first band to play at Rock City on 11 December 1980 supporting The Undertones, who ended the gig with "Teenage Kicks".

=== The 1980s and 1990s ===
Rock City underwent a major refit in 1982 which included a purpose-built sound system, lighting rig and two video screens. Although the club remained faithful to the spirit of rock, with riots at sold-out gigs by The Pogues and Ozzy Osbourne, it was never restricted by genre as by 1982 the club already had a well-established Futurist night every Saturday and were considering starting a student night on Thursdays, approaching DJ Jonathan Woodliffe, who performed the first Thursday night to a crowd of about 400 people. Following the success of Thursday nights the club looked at introducing a dance night, initially playing a mixture of European electronica and American releases, although this was not as successful and was cancelled after a few months. It was replaced by a jazz, funk and soul night which was advertised by word of mouth and was well received. To add to the diversity in music, Rock City also hosted all-age hip-hop jams on Saturday afternoons, establishing breakdancers the Rock City Crew, and the club would also host the first performance of Bring the Noise in the UK by Public Enemy.

As alternative music changed, Rock City changed with it. Grunge and punk became popular in the first part of the 90's, with bands such as Nirvana and Rage Against the Machine appearing. The intimate environment allowed for band members such as Eddie Vedder and Kurt Cobain to sit at the bar with fans after their gigs. Equally, as Britpop became established, Rock City found itself hosting the likes of Oasis and Blur. The Nineties also saw the club change management, as George Akins Jnr. took over at his father's request in 1994, aged just 19 and having previously worked on the bar and cloakroom.

=== The 2000s ===
In keeping with music trends, the new millennium saw Rock City play host to more dance music events. The Rig situated beneath the Main Hall was annexed and operated as a separate venue.

Rock City has remained one of the biggest names on the live circuit for alternative bands and celebrated its 35th anniversary in 2016. In January 2019, the dancefloor was replaced for the first time in forty years.

=== The 2010s ===
==== The Lil Pump gig evacuation ====
In November 2018, over 2000 concertgoers were evacuated from the sold out Lil Pump gig. Nottinghamshire police stated this was due to a smoke flare. The situation was described as "panic" as people struggled to breathe, vomited and cried. The area was cordoned off as emergency workers attended the venue. Only minor injuries were said to have been sustained. Later that evening, as the gig had been cancelled, Lil Pump performed on top of his tour bus at the back of the venue for waiting fans.

=== The 2020s ===
==== The Yard Bar ====
During the 2020 Coronavirus (COVID-19) pandemic that hit the UK, Rock City, upon the gradual re-opening of bars, pubs, restaurants and cafes from 4 July in England, which excluded club venues, utilised their outdoor car-parking space to newly establish the Yard Bar in order to engage in commerce while maintaining government guided social distancing measures.

== Theft problem ==
In January 2013, Nottinghamshire police stated that between September 2011 and August 2012, 10% of all mobile phones stolen in the Nottinghamshire area were stolen at Rock City. Bart Easter, the club's general manager, claimed that organised crime gangs who followed bands on tour were partly to blame. Rock City also faced backlash because of the increase in spiking through needles in Nottingham in 2021

== Club Nights ==
The venue currently hosts four club nights:

- Wednesday: CRISIS – Exclusive club night for University of Nottingham students.
- Thursday: TUNED – Two for one drinks, primarily R&B music.
- Friday: Get Lucky – Pop music from the 1990s, 2000s and current hits.
- Saturday: Rebel Rebel (formerly Hey Hey Hey) – The greatest songs in the world and sing-along anthems.

== Band recordings ==
The following is a list of recordings made at Rock City:

- Richard Thompson - Live at Rock City, Nottingham - November 1986 (2020)
- Frank Turner - Show 2000 (2016)
- Ferocious Dog - Live at Rock City (2015)
- The Wildhearts – Rock City vs the Wildhearts (2014)
- Jimi Jamison – Live at Firefest (2011)
- Enter Shikari – Live at Rock City Bootleg (2009)
- Shaped by Fate – Shaped By Fate tour DVD (2008)
- Bonfire – Double Vision (2006)
- The Libertines – Libertines live at Rock City with Radio 1 (2004)
- Pitchshifter – P.S.I.entology (2004)
- The Wildhearts – The Wildhearts Strike Back (2004)
- Morbid Angel – Altars of Madness (2003)
- Linkin Park - Radio 1 broadcast bootleg (2003)
- Cradle of Filth – Live Bait for the Dead (2001)
- Cradle of Filth – Heavy, Left-Handed and Candid (2001)
- At the Gates – Live in Nottingham at Rock City (1996)
- Radiohead – The Bends Pinkpop (1995)
- The Fall – BBC Radio 1 Live in Concert (1989)
- Napalm Death – The DVD (1989)
- Into A Circle – Live (1987)
- Gene Loves Jezebel - Glad To Be Alive (1986)
- Play Dead – Caught from Behind: Live in England, France, Germany, and Switzerland (1985)
- R.E.M. - R.E.M. at the BBC, Disc 3 (1984)
- Tygers of Pan Tang – Live at Nottingham Rock City (1981)
- New Model Army - Live at Rock City - Nottingham - 28th Feb 1989 (2020)
