= The Scene Is Dead =

Studio album by This Is Menace
- Released: September 24, 2007
- Genre: Metalcore
- Label: Fourth Wall Records
- Producer: Rick Parkhouse

This Is Menace chronology
| No End in Sight (2006) | The Scene Is Dead (2007) |

Professional ratings
Review scores
| Source | Rating |
|---|---|
| NME | 7/10 stars |

The Scene Is Dead is the second and last album by This Is Menace.

== Track listing ==
| No. | Title | Writer(s) | Length |
|---|---|---|---|
| 1. | "Pretty Girls" (featuring Jeff Walker of Carcass) | Bowld; Clayden | 3:13 |
| 2. | "Cut Us (And We Bleed)" (featuring JS Clayden of Pitchshifter) | Bowld; Clayden | 3:19 |
| 3. | "The Great Migration" (featuring Jaz Coleman of Killing Joke) | Bowld; Clayden | 4:09 |
| 4. | "Avenue of Heroes" (featuring Charlie Simpson of Fightstar) | Bowld; Clayden | 3:10 |
| 5. | "High Road" (featuring Mikee Goodman of SikTh and Sad Season) | Bowld; Clayden | 2:58 |
| 6. | "Oversight" (featuring Colin Doran of Hundred Reasons) | Bowld; Clayden | 3:45 |
| 7. | "Return the Favour" (featuring Justin Hill of SikTh) | Bowld; Clayden | 3:03 |
| 8. | "Beg for Silence" (featuring Barney Greenway of Napalm Death) | Bowld; Clayden | 2:53 |
| 9. | "Dig (Your Own Grave)" (featuring Tom Lacey of The Ghost of a Thousand) | Bowld; Clayden | 2:37 |
| 10. | "Sarcophagus" (featuring B'Hellmouth of Send More Paramedics) | Bowld; Clayden | 3:08 |
| 11. | "100 Visions" (featuring Paul Catten of Murder One) | Bowld; Clayden | 3:29 |
| 12. | "Who Has Questions for the Dead?" (featuring Justin Sullivan of New Model Army) | Bowld; Clayden | 3:16 |

== Personnel ==
=== This Is Menace ===
- Jason Bowld - drums, lead guitar, rhythm guitar
- Mark Clayden - bass
- Paul Fletcher - guitar
- Gez Walton - guitar

=== Production ===
- Nigel Crane - photography
- Dose-Productions - artwork
- Rick Parkhouse - Producer
