= Arctangent (disambiguation) =

Arctangent is the inverse of tangent.

It may also refer to:

- arc'tan'gent, an album by Earthtone9
- ArcTanGent, a music festival
