= Jim Davies (musician) =

British guitarist

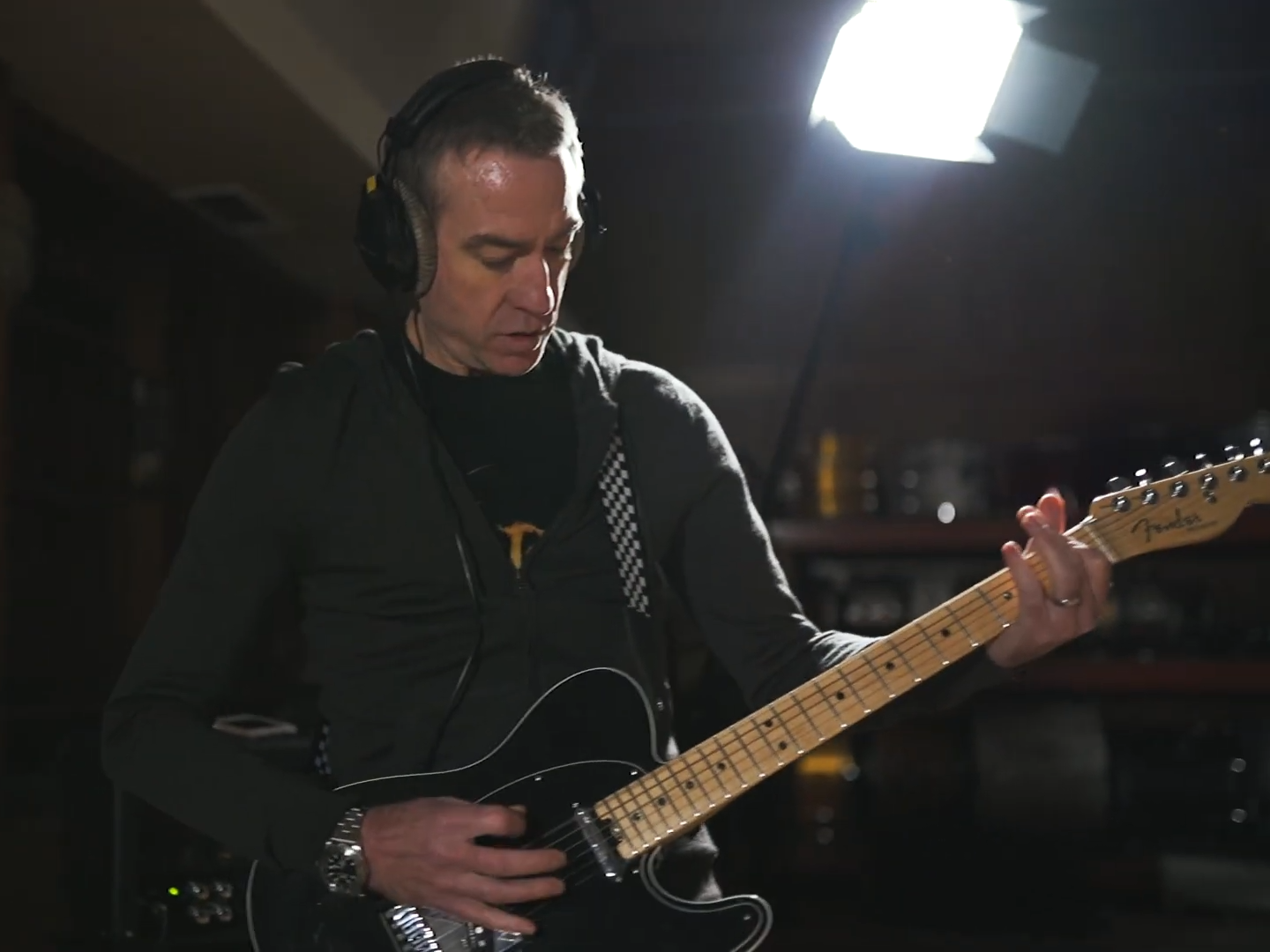
- Davies performing in 2020

Background information
- Born: James Donald Davies; 18 October 1973 (age 52); Maldon, Essex, England
- Genres: Electronic; alternative rock; breakbeat; industrial metal
- Occupation: Guitarist
- Years active: 1988–present
- Member of: Shadow Addict
- Formerly of: The Prodigy; Pitchshifter; Flint

James Donald Davies (born 18 October 1973) is an English musician, best known as the former guitarist for the Prodigy and Pitchshifter.

== Career ==
=== The Prodigy and Pitchshifter (1994–2002) ===
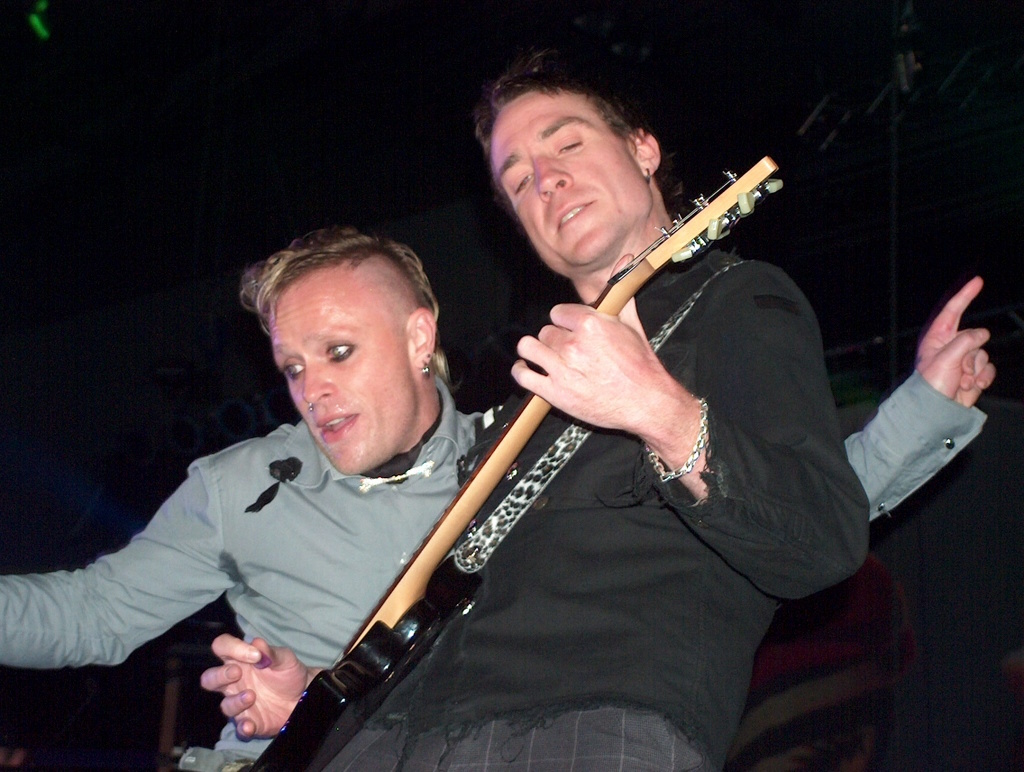
Davies (right) performing with Keith Flint

Davies first played live with The Prodigy around late 1994, including that following year's Glastonbury Festival. After a year of touring worldwide with the band, he contributed to their The Fat of the Land album. This included playing guitar on the subsequent single releases "Firestarter" and "Breathe". In 2010, Total Guitar magazine voted Davies' "Firestarter" riff as one of the top 10 guitar riffs of all time.

Davies joined Pitchshifter in 1998, and played on five tracks on the band's www.pitchshifter.com album. He toured worldwide in support of the album. He went on to co-write the band's next two albums Deviant (MCA Records) and PSI (Sanctuary Records) Deviant charted in the Top 40 in the UK Albums Chart and tours in support of the album included a three-month stint on America's 'Ozzfest' alongside Ozzy Osbourne, Incubus and Pantera.

PSI was Davies' last studio recording with Pitchshifter, although the band released a partial live album, Bootlegged, Distorted, Remixed and Uploaded, which was recorded at the London Astoria and featured Davies' final performance with the band. Pitchshifter went on an "indefinite hiatus" in 2002.

Davies returned to play live with The Prodigy in 2002, including the Reading and Leeds Festival. He contributed to their Always Outnumbered, Never Outgunned album on the track "You'll Be Under My Wheels". When Prodigy frontman Keith Flint recorded a solo album under the name Flint in 2002, Davies provided guitar work for the album. Although Flint played a number of gigs and festivals, the attendant album, entitled Device #1, due to be issued by Polydor Records, was never released. The Flint track "Razor" was re-worked by Liam Howlett and featured on the Prodigy's greatest hits album as an exclusive track.

=== Solo and session work (2007–2011) ===
In 2007, Davies formed the band Victory Pill and released a self-titled album. Two years later his instrumental album, Electronic Guitar, was released by Mascot Records. 2012 saw the release of Victory Pill's second album, The Digital Divide.

During this same period, Davies also provided guitars for DJ Hyper's live band alongside former Prodigy dancer Leeroy Thornhill. The band toured including festival performances at Japan's Fuji Rock festival, Denmark's Roskilde festival and Glastonbury in the UK. The album We Control was released in 2006.

Davies co-wrote several tracks on the band's next album entitled Suicide Tuesday and provided vocals for the album's opening track "Centre Attraction". The band's music featured on many trailers for major films.

In 2011, HYPER released The Panic album which also featured Davies on guitar on several tracks.

=== Production music (2011–present) ===
From 2011 onwards, Davies began a new path in his music career by becoming a prolific writer of production music for TV and film on a full-time basis, working with Extreme Music, for whom he has written around 700 tracks to date. He is also a freelance composer for Hans Zimmer and Extreme Music's Custom Music company Bleeding Fingers, which has led to him composing music for a large variety of well known reality TV shows and documentaries. He won the 2019 Production Music Award for Best Wildcard Track with Nick Kingsley for the track "Unleash the Devil".

In 2015, Davies collaborated with electronic artist Tut Tut Child on the track "Talking of Axes" released on Monstercat.

Davies did not participate in the 2018 Pitchshifter reunion tour. His album Headwars was released in April 2020; it features collaborations with his former Pitchshifter bandmates Jason Bowld and Mark Clayden.

In 2021, Davies announced the formation of a new project called Shadow Addict, together with Bowld, Nick Kingsley and Bullet for My Valentine bassist Jamie Mathias on vocals.

Davies released his second solo album Prey Later on 19 November 2021. It features guest vocals from Bullet for my valentine Bass player Jamie Mathias. Former Pitchshifter band mate Jason Bowld plays live drums on 3 tracks on the album.

== Discography ==
- The Prodigy – The Fat of the Land (1997)
- Pitchshifter – www.pitchshifter.com (1998)
- Pitchshifter – Deviant (2000)
- Pitchshifter – PSI (2002)
- The Prodigy – Always Outnumbered, Never Outgunned (2004)
- DJ Hyper – We Control (2006)
- Victory Pill – Victory Pill (2007)
- Jim Davies – Electronic Guitar (2009)
- Victory Pill – The Digital Divide (2011)
- Jim Davies – Headwars (2020)
- Shadow Addict – Vibrations (2021, EP)
- Jim Davies – Prey Later (2021)
- Pig – Red Room (2024)
