= Hiding Place (band) =

Scottish rock band

- Origin: East Kilbride, Scotland
- Genres: Alternative rock
- Years active: 2004–2007
- Label: RCA
- Past members: Paul McCallion; JayJay Robertson Somerville; Del Robertson Somerville; Doug Smith; Jason Bowld
- Website: https://www.delandjayjayweddingphotography.com/

Hiding Place was a rock band from East Kilbride, Scotland.

== History ==
The band comprised singer Paul McCallion, guitarists JayJay and Del Robertson Somerville, and Doug Smith, with Pitchshifter drummer Jason Bowld joining in 2004. They were previously known as Quarantine and once opened for lostprophets at the Glasgow Cathouse.

The band's debut release was the At One Time or Another EP in 2004. They toured in support of InMe and released (What if) the Truth Looks Clearer Empty later that year. They toured with The Rasmus and opened for Metallica, and Cruel Kindness followed in November 2004.

McCallion and Bowles were also part of the supergroup This Is Menace, along with members of Pitchshifter, Therapy?, Hundred Reasons, Funeral for a Friend and Carcass.

== Discography ==
- At One Time Or Another EP (2004)
- (What If) The Truth Looks Clearer Empty (2004)
- Cruel Kindness (2004)
- Secrets and Passers-by
