= None for All and All for One =

EP by Pitchshifter
- Released: 2006
- Recorded: Recorded at The Manor, Sherman Oaks, California, C & P PSI Records Inc (PRS), at Van Nuys, California. Live drums performed at RNT Studios, United Kingdom. Preproduction at Nasty Man Studios, Nottingham. Recorded at Vada Studios and produced and mixed at The Engine House, UK.
- Length: 25:36
- Label: PSI Records
- Producer: J.S. Clayden

Pitchshifter chronology
Bootlegged, Distorted, Remixed and Uploaded (2003)	None for All and All for One (2006)	Cohesion (2007)

None for All and All for One is a limited edition EP of new material written in secret by the British alternative band Pitchshifter. The EP was given away free with every ticket purchased for every show on the 'Back From the Dead' tour in March 2006. It was also available through their store on the PSI Records website until October 2007. 'Predisposed (To Sickness)' is a cover of the This Is Menace song 'Predisposed'. The EP was re-released for download in 2018 in preparation for the band's reunion tour.

== Track listing ==
1. Burning (Out of Control) – 3:44
2. Does It Really Matter? – 3:34
3. Predisposed (To Sickness) – 2:46
4. Burning (Out of Control) – Meltdown Mix – 4:31
5. Does It Really Matter – Heat Treatment Mix – 4:04
6. Burning (Out of Control) – Molotov Mix – 6:53

== Personnel ==
=== Pitchshifter ===
- JS Clayden – lead vocals, guitars, programming
- Mark Clayden - bass
- Jason Bowld – drums

=== Additional musician ===
- Billy Morrison – guitars, bass

=== Production ===
- JS Clayden, James Edwards, Matt Terry, Rail Rogut and Rick Parkhouse – engineering
- JS Clayden and Jason Bowld – production, mixing and programming
- Mike Clink – recording
- Billy Morrison, J.S. Clayden, Jason Bowld and Mark Clayden – writers
- JS Clayden – mastering
- Rick Powell, Drawbacks and Ma Saski – remixes
- Design by DOSE-productions.com
- Front cover by Julien Morel - Joolz
