= Microwaved =

1998 single by Pitchshifter

Single by Pitchshifter

from the album www.pitchshifter.com
- Released: 1998
- Recorded: 1997
- Genre: Nu metal, industrial rock, drum and bass
- Length: 3.28
- Label: Geffen
- Songwriter(s): JS Clayden, Mark D. Clayden, Johnny A. Carter

Pitchshifter singles chronology
"Genius" (1997)	"Microwaved" (1998)	"W.Y.S.I.W.Y.G" (1998)

"Microwaved" is a song from English industrial metal band Pitchshifter. It is the second single from their fourth full-length album, www.pitchshifter.com.

The song was featured on the video games Twisted Metal 3 and Test Drive 5, both for the PlayStation.

== Track listing ==
=== UK 7" version ===
1. "Microwaved"
2. "Genius (Deejay Punk Roc Dubalicious Mix)"

=== US 7" version ===
1. "Microwaved"
2. "Genius"

=== 12" version ===
1. "Microwaved (LP Version)"
2. "Genius (Deejay Punk-Roc Dubalicious Mix)"
3. "Genius (Lunatic Calm Mix)"

== Charts ==
Chart (1998)	Peak position
Scotland (OCC)	58
UK Singles (OCC)	54
