= Frank Booth (Blue Velvet) =

- First appearance: Blue Velvet (1986)
- Created by: David Lynch
- Portrayed by: Dennis Hopper

In-universe information
- Gender: Male
- Occupation: Gangster; Drug-dealer; Pimp
- Nationality: American

Frank Booth is a fictional character and the main antagonist in David Lynch's 1986 psychological thriller Blue Velvet, portrayed by Dennis Hopper. A violent drug-dealer, he has kidnapped the family of lounge singer Dorothy Vallens, holding them hostage in order to force her into becoming his sex slave. Their encounters are characterized by Frank huffing an unknown gas from a tank he carries with him. This causes him to exhibit a split personality between two individuals he identifies as "Baby" and "Daddy", whose personas he assumes to engage in acts of ritualistic rape. One of Frank's associates is a police detective nicknamed the "Yellow Man" (for his distinctive yellow sport coat), who helps Frank by killing rival drug-dealers. The Yellow Man later steals their supplies from the evidence room, so Frank can sell them himself.

Hopper's performance as Frank was critically acclaimed, and the character was ranked No. 36 on AFI's list of the top 50 film villains of all time.

== Portrayal ==
Frank Booth is a crazed, foul-mouthed and psychopathic gangster, drug-dealer and pimp, who is the central figure in Lumberton, North Carolina's criminal underworld. He is an aggressive, sadistic, perverse and abusive man with a hair-trigger temper that can flare into rage or violence without warning. He often enhances his disturbing behaviour by inhaling amyl nitrite.

It is also implied that he suffered abuse as a child and had an incestuous relationship with his mother, which manifested his inhuman character traits—which he seems to embrace through sexual role-play.

Booth kidnaps singer Dorothy Vallens' husband and son, holding them hostage to force Dorothy into becoming his sex slave. When he is with Dorothy, he exhibits a kind of split personality: "Daddy", a sadist who beats and demeans her, probably stemming from the abuse Booth suffered as a child at the hands of his father; and "Baby", a child who ritualistically rapes her while begging her to gag him with a piece of blue velvet cloth, probably stemming from the abuse and incestuous relations he endured as a child at the hands of his mother. His sexual arousal is highlighted by fits of violent rage.

After Dorothy proves reluctant to continue her relationship with Booth, he severs her husband's ear, which is found by college student Jeffrey Beaumont. While investigating the case, Jeffrey spies on Booth abusing Dorothy. Later, Jeffrey and Dorothy begin a sexual relationship. Jeffrey begins following Booth and observing his day-to-day life, learning that he works with a police detective whom Jeffrey calls the "Yellow Man".

Booth catches Jeffrey and Dorothy together and forces them to accompany him to the apartment of "Suave Ben", the man holding Dorothy's husband and son. At Booth's instigation, Ben lip-syncs a performance of Roy Orbison's "In Dreams", which brings tears to Booth’s eyes. Afterward, Booth takes Jeffrey to a lumber yard and kisses him before beating him up. Sometime later, Booth murders Dorothy's husband, beats her nearly to death, and leaves her naked on Jeffrey's lawn.

Jeffrey follows Booth to Dorothy's apartment, where he finds the corpse of Dorothy's husband and the Yellow Man, whom Booth has shot in the head in anticipation of leaving town. Using a police radio to distract him, Jeffrey hides in a closet with a gun and watches while Booth returns to the apartment to execute the Yellow Man. Booth begins searching the apartment for Jeffrey, but when he opens the closet, Jeffrey shoots him in the head, killing him.

== Cultural impact ==
Frank's lines and extensive use of the word "fuck" are frequently referenced in pop culture.

Pop Will Eat Itself's 'Pretty Pretty' contains several noticeable pieces of dialogue from Frank's psychotic ramblings. The line, "Don't you fucking look at me!" was voted by Première as one of the "100 Greatest Quotes in Cinema", and was sampled by electronic act Faultline for use in the title track of the album Closer, Colder.

Industrial group Pigface sampled one of Booth's lines for use in the remix song "Sick Asp Fuck".

Samples of Frank speaking are strewn throughout Mr. Bungle's self-titled album. The track "Squeeze me Macaroni" samples Frank's lines "Man, where's the fucking beer, man?" and "One thing I can't fucking stand is warm beer, makes me fucking puke!"

The band Ministry samples Booth's line "Let's hit the fucking road!" in the song "Jesus Built My Hotrod".

Several samples of Frank Booth are used in the Acid Bath song "Cassie Eats Cockroaches" from their debut album When the Kite String Pops.

Terrorvision released a song titled “Like Frank” on their mini-album ‘The First And The Last…’ (featuring their first 4, and last 4 songs - released at the time of their initial breakup) referencing the character explicitly.

The cover of the Pitchshifter album Industrial is an image of Frank after he was fatally shot.

When hosting Saturday Night Live, Dennis Hopper appeared in a skit as Frank Booth, hosting a game show titled "What's That Smell?", which he opened with Frank's line "Hello, neighbor."

In a 2011 interview with Rolling Stone, David Lynch was asked "Who is a more dangerous gentleman, Frank Booth or Marcellus Santos?" Lynch replied "That's a good question. I'd rather hang with Frank Booth. I'd rather chill with him, and wait for a booty call, than with Marcellus."

=== Lists ===
- The character ranks No. 36 on AFI's list of the top 50 film villains of all time.
- Première magazine listed Booth No. 54 on its list of The 100 Greatest Movie Characters of All Time, calling him one of "the most monstrously funny creations in cinema history".
- Empire magazine placed Frank Booth as the 67th Greatest Film Character of all time.
- "Don't you fucking look at me!" was voted by Première as one of the "100 Greatest Quotes in Cinema".

== Casting ==
The part of Frank Booth was originally offered to Willem Dafoe and Richard Bright, who both turned it down. Michael Ironside has stated that Frank was written with him in mind. When Hopper read the script, he called director Lynch and said, "You have to let me play Frank! Because I am Frank!"

== Unnamed drug ==
Throughout the film, Frank Booth uses a medical mask and tube to inhale some kind of stimulant from an aerosol canister. The identity of this gas is a subject of debate. Lynch's script specified helium, to raise Frank's voice and have it resemble that of an infant. However, during filming, Hopper, an experienced drug-user, said he had insight into Frank's choice of drug, and that helium was inappropriate. Lynch later explained the change:

I'm thankful to Dennis, because up until the last minute, it was gonna be helium—to make the difference between 'Daddy' and the baby that much more. But I didn't want it to be funny. So helium went out the window and became just a gas. Then, in the first rehearsal, Dennis said, 'David, I know what's in these different canisters.' And I said, 'Thank God, Dennis, that you know that!' And he named all the gases.

In a documentary on the 2002 Special edition DVD version of the film, Hopper says the drug was amyl nitrite, an angina medication used recreationally as an inhalant in the disco club scene.
