= Infotainment? =

1996 album by Pitchshifter

Studio album by Pitch Shifter
- Released: 7 May 1996
- Recorded: 26 September – 9 October (1–7, 9), 14–18 November 1995 (8)
- Studio: Chapel (Lincolnshire); PSI (Nottingham)
- Genre: Industrial metal, industrial rock
- Length: 39:07
- Label: Earache
- Producer: Simon Efemey; Pitch Shifter

Pitch Shifter chronology
The Remix War (1995)	Infotainment? (1996)	www.pitchshifter.com (1998)

Pitch Shifter studio album chronology
Desensitized (1993)	Infotainment? (1996)	www.pitchshifter.com (1998)

Professional ratings
Review scores
Source	Rating
AllMusic	4/5 stars
Chronicles of Chaos	10/10
Collector's Guide to Heavy Metal	8/10
Kerrang!	4/5 stars
NME	2/10

Infotainment? is the third album by the band Pitch Shifter, released in 1996.

There was a bonus disc called Exploitainment which was only given away with the Infotainment? limited festival edition. The disc also featured a CD ROM Video Section for the songs: "Underachiever", "Triad", and "Deconstruction" and 2 audio tracks: "Underachiever (0990 243003 Mix)" and "Product Placement (Disinformation Mix)".

== Track listing ==
All tracks are written by Pitchshifter.

No.	Title	Length
1.	"Introductory Disclaimer"	1:18
2.	"Underachiever"	2:51
3.	"(We're Behaving Like) Insects"	3:38
4.	"Virus"	3:43
5.	"Product Placement"	4:19
6.	"(Harmless) Interlude"	0:37
7.	"Bloodsweatsaliva"	3:28
8.	"Hangar 84"	5:36
9.	"Whiteout"	3:03
10.	"Phoenixology"	3:52
11.	"Pitch Sampler Vol. I"	3:24
12.	"Pitch Sampler Vol. II"	3:18

- Track 0 "Data Track" is a CD-ROM track.

== Credits ==
Personnel per liner notes.

Pitchshifter

- J.S. Clayden - lead vocals
- Johnny A. Carter - guitars, programming
- Mark Clayden - bass
- D.J. Walters - live drums

Production

- J.S. Clayden, Omni-Design, Fluid and Alex CRi - artwork
- Ewan Davies - engineering (tracks 1 to 7 and 9)
- Kevin Metcalfe - mastering
- Andrea Wright, Ric Peet - mixing (tracks 1–9)
- Ralph Barklam - photographer
- Pitch Shifter and Simon Efemey - production

== Exploitainment? ==
Exploitainment?

EP by Pitch Shifter
- Released: 1999
- Recorded: 1995
- Genre: Industrial metal
- Length: 7:17
- Label: Earache

Pitch Shifter chronology
Exploitainment? (1999)	Deviant Sampler (2000)

This is a bonus disc which was given away in 1999 with the Infotainment? re-release.

The disc also featured a CD ROM Video Section for the songs: "Underachiever," "Triad," and "Deconstruction."

=== Track listings ===
1. "Underachiever (0990 243003 Mix)"
2. "Product Placement (Disinformation Mix)"
