= Www.pitchshifter.com =

www.pitchshifter.com

Studio album by Pitchshifter
- Released: 2 March 1998
- Recorded: 1997
- Studios: PSI Studios, Protocol Studios, London and at The Machine Shop, Hoboken, New Jersey
- Genres: Industrial rock; nu metal; drum and bass
- Length: 51:50
- Label: Geffen
- Producer: Machine

Pitchshifter chronology
Infotainment? (1996)	www.pitchshifter.com (1998)	Un-United Kingdom (1999)

Pitchshifter studio album chronology
Infotainment? (1996)	www.pitchshifter.com (1998)	Deviant (2000)

Singles from www.pitchshifter.com
- 1. "Genius" Released: 1998; 2. "Microwaved" Released: 1998

www.pitchshifter.com is the fourth album by the British industrial metal band Pitchshifter. It was released in the United Kingdom by Geffen Records on 2 March 1998, and in the United States by DGC Records on 7 April 1998. The record, which was their first released through a major label, sold just over 60,000 copies in the US alone—selling nearly twice as much as the group's preceding album Deviant did (which sold 33,000 copies).

The album's name comes from the band's domain name–a relative novelty at the time of the release. The domain name registration was eventually lapsed; JS Clayden said: "we carried the website for such a long time that it felt like a burden being lifted to let it go".

Multiple songs from www.pitchshifter.com were included on the vehicular-based PlayStation games Twisted Metal III and Test Drive 5.

== Album cover ==
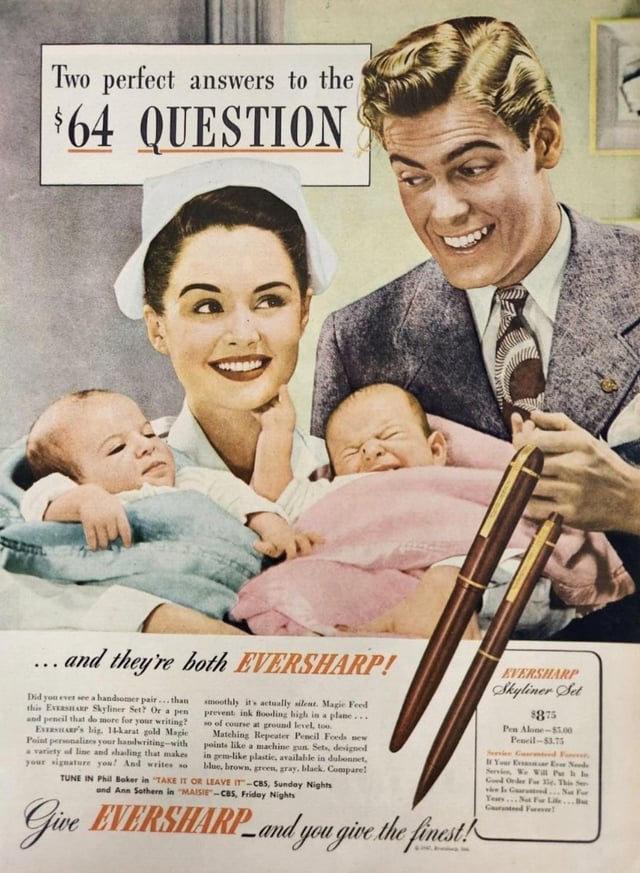
The original image of the advertisement for the Eversharp presentation set of writing utensils (1946).

The album cover features a heavily edited and distorted image of a 1946 advertisement for Eversharp brand of pens. The background contains snippets of computer code and what appears to be Japanese text. The bottom of the image was heavily warped to remove elements of the advertisement so it could be repurposed for album art.

== Reception ==
Professional ratings
Review scores
Source	Rating
AllMusic	4/5 stars
The Baltimore Sun	2.5/4 stars
Collector's Guide to Heavy Metal	3/10
Kerrang!	(1998) (2011)
Metal Hammer	10/10
Pitchfork	5.2/10
Rock Hard	10/10
Uncut	4/5 stars

In 2005, Rock Hard placed www.pitchshifter.com at number 263 on their list of the "500 Greatest Rock & Metal Albums of All Time". Also in 2005, Kerrang! ranked the album as the 45th greatest British rock album of all time. In 2016, Metal Hammer named it the 10th best industrial metal album.

== Track listing ==
No.	Title	Length
1.	"Microwaved"	3:28
2.	"2nd Hand"	3:31
3.	"Genius"	4:06
4.	"Civilised"	4:38
5.	"Subject to Status"	3:34
6.	"W.Y.S.I.W.Y.G." (acronym for "What You See Is What You Get")	3:45
7.	"Please Sir"	3:47
8.	"Disposable"	3:38
9.	"A Better Lie™"	3:13
10.	"Innit"	2:52
11.	"What's in It for Me?"	2:56
12.	"I Don't Like It"	3:53
13.	"ZX81"	6:33
14.	"Free Samples"	1:48

== Personnel ==
Pitchshifter

- J.S. Clayden - vocals, beats, programming
- Mark Clayden - bass, sampler
- Jim Davies - guitars
- Johnny A. Carter - guitars, programming
- D.J. Walters - drums

Additional musicians

- Keith York - drums, percussion samples
- Pablo Yeadon - acoustic guitar on "Disposable"

Production

- H. Forbes, Paul Williams, Nick Philip and Unknown Graphic Services - artwork
- Johnny Carter and Neil Simmons - engineering
- Jodie Zalewski - assistant engineer
- Johnny Carter and J.S. Clayden - programming
- Bob Ludwig - mastering
- Ralph Barklam and Tony Woolliscroft - photography
- Machine - production
- Clinton Bradley - additional analog synthesizer manipulation
- Johnny Carter and JS Clayden - writer

== See also ==
- J-Tull Dot Com
