= Deviant (Pitchshifter album) =

Studio album by Pitchshifter
- Released: 23 May 2000
- Recorded: 1999–2000
- Studio: Pitchshifter Studios, Shabby Road, Nottingham, Eldorado Studios, Burbank
- Genre: Industrial metal; nu metal; alternative metal; drum and bass
- Length: 44:50
- Label: MCA, Universal
- Producer: Dave Jerden

Pitchshifter chronology
Un-United Kingdom (1999)	Deviant (2000)	PSI (2002)

Pitchshifter studio album chronology
www.pitchshifter.com (1998)	Deviant (2000)	PSI (2002)

Professional ratings
Review scores
Source	Rating
AllMusic	3/5 stars
Collector's Guide to Heavy Metal	5/10
earPollution	Favorable
Exclaim!	Mixed
Kerrang!	5/5 stars
Legends	Favorable
Metal Hammer	9/10
PopMatters	Mixed
Sea of Tranquility	3/5 stars

Deviant is the fifth album by the British industrial metal band Pitchshifter, released in 2000. It was a follow-up to the commercially successful album www.pitchshifter.com, but was seen by the record label as a disappointment. Promotional videos by DOSE Productions were made for the tracks "Hidden Agenda" and "Dead Battery". The track "Everything's Fucked" was originally released as "Everything Sucks". Jello Biafra makes an appearance on the track "As Seen on TV". By March 2002, the album had sold 33,000 copies in the U.S., just over half the amount www.pitchshifter.com had sold at the same time.

Before Deviant was released, a promotional sampler CD was released under the name 'Deviant Sampler'.

== Track listing ==
No.	Title	Writer(s)	Length
1.	"Condescension"	Jonathan Alan Carter, Jonathan Seth Clayden, James Donald Davies	3:12
2.	"Wafer Thin"	Pitchshifter	3:31
3.	"Keep it Clean"	Clayden, Davies	3:50
4.	"Forget the Facts"	Pitchshifter	3:16
5.	"Hidden Agenda"	Pitchshifter	4:16
6.	"Scene This"	Pitchshifter	3:52
7.	"Dead Battery"	Pitchshifter	3:45
8.	"As Seen on TV"	Pitchshifter	2:54
9.	"Everything's Fucked"	Pitchshifter	4:26
10.	"Chump Change"	Pitchshifter	3:45
11.	"Stronger"	Pitchshifter	3:37
12.	"P.S.I.cological"	Pitchshifter	4:37

== Album cover ==
Pitchshifter's album cover used a picture of a painting by Gee Vaucher, who did artwork for Crass and Carcass. The painting shows a cross between the Pope John Paul II and Queen Elizabeth II. The album cover was banned in Poland, due to some of the public's response and complaints deeming the image offensive and insulting to the Pope. The band and MCA Records apologized and changed the artwork.

== Personnel ==
=== Pitchshifter ===
- J.S. Clayden – vocals, programming, engineering
- Jim Davies – guitars
- Mark Clayden – bass

=== Additional musicians ===
- John Stanier - additional live drums
- Jello Biafra – additional vocals (8)

=== Technical personnel ===
- Johnny Carter – additional programming, engineering
- Annette Cisneros – engineering
- Elan Trujillo – assistant engineering
- Steve Duda – additional programming, additional editing
- Bryan "Dewey" Hall – guitar technician
- The Drum Doctor – drum technician
- Sarah Debord – studio assistance
- Tony Santiago – studio assistance
- Chris Jensen – studio assistance
- Eddie Schreyer – mastering
- Gee Vaucher – front cover original black and white painting
- Howard – cover painting manipulation
- Dave Willis – band photos
- Tony Woolliscroft – band photos
- The Huja Brothers – "Rat Bastard" comic
