= Suicide Tuesday =

Studio album by DJ Hyper
- Released: 13 October 2008
- Length: 43:03
- Label: Kilowatt
- Producer: Guy Hatfield

DJ Hyper chronology
We Control (2006)	Suicide Tuesday (2008)	The Panic (2011)

Suicide Tuesday is the second studio album produced by DJ Hyper or simply known as "Hyper" and was released on 13 October 2008.

== Track listing ==
1. "Centre Attraction" featuring Jim Davies – 3:39
2. "Let Me In" featuring Leeroy Thornhill – 3:32
3. "I'm an Image" featuring Charlotte Cooper - 4:08
4. "Jabba" - 3:45
5. "Touch" featuring Leeroy Thornhill - 4:07
6. "Replica" featuring Odissi - 4:21
7. "Deteriorate" featuring J.Ross & K.Pepper - 3:36
8. "No Rockstars" featuring J.Ross & S.Evans - 5:34
9. "Push It" featuring Leeroy Thornhill - 4:21
10. "I'm Sick" featuring Axe-Girl - 5:52
