= Submit =

EP by Pitch Shifter
- Released: 23 March 1992
- Recorded: August 1991 – January 1992
- Studio: Bandwagon
- Genre: Industrial metal, sludge metal
- Length: 56:58
- Label: Earache
- Producer: J.A. Carter

Pitch Shifter chronology
Industrial (1991)	Submit (1992)	Desensitized (1993)

Singles from Submit
- 1. "Deconstruction" Released: 1992

Professional ratings
Review scores
Source	Rating
AllMusic	3/5 stars
Audio Drudge	Favorable

Submit is a mini-album (and second major release overall) by the British band Pitch Shifter, released on 23 March 1992 by Earache on LP, cassette and CD.

== Background ==
Submit was released in a few different configurations. On the tracklisting, five of the songs are labeled as alternate versions. With the exception of "New Flesh", none of Submit's songs appeared on any of Pitchshifter's other studio albums. Submit was referred to as both an EP and as a mini-album. Its total running time ran over a half hour (although with the last song's silence removed, it totaled roughly a half hour).

French black metal band Blut Aus Nord covered "Bastardiser" for their EP Debemur Morti.

== Track listing ==
No.	Title	Length
1.	"Gritter (version)"	4:03
2.	"Deconstruction"	3:56
3.	"New Flesh P.S.I. (re-mix version)"	5:18
4.	"Bastardiser (re-mix version)"	3:46
5.	"Dry Riser Inlet (version)"	4:19
6.	"Tendrill (version)" (includes hidden track "Silo")	35:36

=== 1995 re-release bonus tracks ===
No.	Title	Writer(s)	Length
7.	"Deconstruction (live)"		5:06
8.	"Landfill (live)"	Clayden	5:08

== Personnel ==
=== Pitchshifter ===
- J.S. Clayden – vocals, artwork
- Mark Clayden – bass
- Johnny A. Carter – lead guitar, programming
- Stuart E. Toolin – rhythm guitar

=== Technical personnel ===
- Dave Lawrence – engineering
- M. Akerman – photography
