= We Control =

Studio album by DJ Hyper
- Released: 8 May 2006
- Length: 39:32
- Label: Kilowatt
- Producer: Guy Hatfield

DJ Hyper chronology
We Control (2006)	Suicide Tuesday (2008)

We Control is the debut studio album produced by English musician DJ Hyper or simply known "Hyper" and was released in 2006. The single "We Control" is featured on the popular 2005 racing game Need for Speed: Most Wanted as well as the 2008 ATV racing game PURE. The single "Ant Music" is featured on 2006 sport game FIFA Street 2.

== Track listing ==
1. "We Control" (feat. MC Xander) – 3:21
2. "Twisted Emotion" (feat. Leeroy Thornhill) – 3:53
3. "Ant Music" (feat. Leeroy Thornhill) – 2:54
4. "This Is a Warning" (feat. Wildchild) – 4:24
5. "Set Fire to Me" (feat. Dirty Harry) – 4:21
6. "Dirty Mind" (feat. Leeroy Thornhill) – 4:28
7. "Morning" (feat. Leeroy Thornhill) – 3:54
8. "Never Stop" (feat. Dirty Harry) – 3:29
9. "Cascade" – 4:12
10. "Electro-Lude" – 4:18
