= B.R.O.T.H.E.R. movement =

UK protest group

The Black Rhyme Organisation to Help Equal Rights (B.R.O.T.H.E.R.) was a 1989 protest supergroup founded in the United Kingdom by the raga-rap group Gatecrash and a collective of Hip hop musicians to protest the policies of apartheid in South Africa.

The group's debut single, Beyond the 16th Parallel, was released on Island Records "4th & Broadway" label. It was followed by a music video. The artists involved donated all royalties to the African National Congress.

The second B.R.O.T.H.E.R. project was a three-track EP, Ghettogeddon, focusing on the issue of inner city gun culture in the early 1990s. The artists involved donated all royalties to SCAR, Sickle Cell Anemia Research.

== Participants ==
- Adisa
- Cookie Crew
- Crucial Robbie
- Demon Boyz
- Jerry Dammers
- Five Black Intellects
- Freshki
- Gatecrash
- Gunshot
- Bernie Grant
- Hijack
- Icepick
- Junior San
- Katch 22
- Junior Reid
- London Posse
- London Rhyme Syndicate
- MC Mell'O'
- Mr Banton
- Overlord X
- Ricky Rankin
- Rebel MC
- Andrew Sloley
- She Rockers
- Son of Noise
- Standing Ovation
- Sweetie Ire
- Tenna Fly
- Tippa Irie
- Trouble & Bass

== See also ==
- Artists United Against Apartheid
