= Desensitized (Pitchshifter album) =

1993 album

Studio album by Pitch Shifter
- Released: 14 December 1993
- Recorded: April 1993–May 1993
- Studio: Rhythm Studios
- Genre: Industrial metal, technical thrash metal
- Length: 74:53
- Label: Earache
- Producer: Paul Johnston, Pitch Shifter

Pitch Shifter chronology
Submit (1992)	Desensitized (1993)	The Remix War (1995)

Pitch Shifter studio album chronology
Industrial (1991)	Desensitized (1993)	Infotainment? (1996)

Professional ratings
Review scores
Source	Rating
AllMusic	4/5 stars
Collector's Guide to Heavy Metal	6/10
The Encyclopedia of Popular Music	3/5 stars
Rock Hard	7.5/10

Desensitized is the second album by the industrial metal band Pitch Shifter, released on Earache Records in 1993. A music video was made for the track "Triad" that featured the band playing in a white room. The same track was also featured in the 1994 science fiction/horror film Brainscan.

== Critical reception ==
The Encyclopedia of Popular Music wrote that "the lyrics built on the themes of oppression and social injustice, while the use of samplers and sequencers offered an extra aural dimension." Metal Hammer's The Book of Metal wrote that "the rumbling bass lines and jarring Prong-esque guitars filled dancefloors in alternative clubs across Europe."

== Track listing ==
All tracks are written by Pitchshifter

No.	Title	Length
1.	"Lesson One"	0:12
2.	"Diable"	6:02
3.	"Ephemerol"	4:14
4.	"Triad"	4:30
5.	"To Die Is Gain"	4:52
6.	"(A Higher Form of) Killing"	4:44
7.	"Lesson Two"	0:06
8.	"Cathode"	7:31
9.	"N/A"	0:13
10.	"Gatherer. of. Data."	4:57
11.	"N.C.M."	5:10
12.	"Routine" (The song "Routine" ends at 4:03. After 23 minutes and 15 seconds of silence [4:03 - 27:18], begins the hidden song "Landfill" [27:18 - 32:22])	32:22

== Personnel ==
=== Pitchshifter ===
- Johnny A. Carter – guitars, programming
- Mark Clayden – bass
- 'D'.J. Walters – live drums
- J.S. Clayden – vocals

=== Technical personnel ===
- Paul Johnston – production, engineering
- Omni-Design – cover design
- Matt Anchor – band photo
