= Gunshot (band) =

British hip hop group

Gunshot is a British hip hop group, formed by MC Mercury, MC Alkaline, Q-Roc, DJ White Child Rix and DJ/MC Barry Blue in the area of Leyton in east London, around 1988/1989. They were originally called Sudden Impact.

== Career ==
They released their debut single "Battle Creek Brawl" (Vinyl Solution, 1990) to some acclaim, which was followed swiftly by the single "No Sell Out/Crime Story" (Vinyl Solution, 1991). Both singles were well received within the hip hop scene, but following this release Q-Roc left the group to join Son of Noise under the name Curoc. Mercury, Alkaline and White Child Rix continued with the group, releasing a succession of singles in 1991/1992, that soon cemented them a place as one of the leaders of the UK hip hop scene. Their style was hardcore and fast, quickly coming to be considered—along with groups such as Hijack—the defining style of the genre.

One of their releases in this period was "Killing Season/Nobody Move" (Vinyl Solution, 1992), which was the first of their tunes to feature guest vocals from the rapper Barry Blue. Blue continued to provide guest vocals on some tracks for the group right up until their final album, as well as releasing the White Child Rix produced "The Story Begins . . . EP" (Move, 1994) as a solo artist.

The reception to Gunshot's first singles by British hip hop fans and DJs was good and demand grew for an album. The group released Patriot Games, notable for the track "Mind of a Razor," which was subsequently released as a remixed single featuring guitar by Shane Embury of the British extreme metal band, Napalm Death. A 10" vinyl single was also released featuring the bonus track 'Lockdown (Prequel Version)' which was unavailable anywhere else. Patriot Games reached number 60 in the UK Albums Chart in June 1993.

More singles followed, including "Colour Code" (Vinyl Solution, 1994) which featured a second 12" & CD single with remixes by Depth Charge - repaying the favour of Alkaline rapping for them on the "Depth Charge vs Silver Fox" (Silver Fox Records, 1991) single.

In 1994, instead of a second studio album, their label Vinyl Solution released a compilation of the group's singles. This marked the end of Gunshot's association with Vinyl Solution, and the group went underground. They communicated with their fans via their now defunct website, whilst they worked on getting a new recording contract.

A new single "Ghetto Heartbeat" and album – Twilight's Last Gleaming appeared in 1997 on the 'Words Of Warning' label, and was followed in 2000 by their next album, International Rescue. The track "The English Patient" included guest spots from The Icepick, Blade, MC Mell'O' and Chester P. The album was billed as Gunshot's final before it was released. In 2017, Naked Ape Records and Underground United reissued the album on double vinyl.

From 2001 to 2003 Alkaline guested on tracks by Junior Disprol and Aspects, while Mercury featured on a track from Snuff The Ablist.

In 2018, after an 18 year hiatus, Gunshot returned with their new single "Sulphur".

Two years later, in February 2020, another single "Burn Cycle" was released.

In early 2023, rapper Alkaline passed away. Gunshot released a tribute song "Alkaline" in May 2024.

In October 2024 Gunshot released their 4th album in 24-years entitled "Black Lebanon Volume 1" - on Ventilate Records & Underground United. The 10-track album is made up of several new songs and includes remixes and demos of previously released tracks. The download version includes 4 bonus tracks.

== Discography ==
=== Singles ===
- "Battle Creek Brawl" (Vinyl Solution, 1990)
- "Crime Story" / "No Sell Out" (Vinyl Solution, 1991)
- "Clear From Present Danger" / "Interception Squad" (Vinyl Solution, 1991)
- "Killing Season" / "Nobody Move!" (Vinyl Solution, 1992)
- "Children of a Dying Breed" (Vinyl Solution, 1993)
- "Mind of a Razor" (Vinyl Solution, 1994)
- "Colour Code" / "Gunshots History" (Vinyl Solution, 1994)
- "Colour Code Remixes" (Vinyl Solution, 1994)
- "Ghetto Heartbeat" (Words of Warning, 1997)
- "Sulphur" - (Naked Ape Records / Underground United, 2018)
- "Sulphur Remix" - (Naked Ape Records / Underground United, 2018)
- "Burn Cycle" - (Underground United, 2020)
- "Alkaline" - (Ventilate Records, 2024)

=== Albums ===
- Compilation (Vinyl Solution, 1992)
- Patriot Games (Vinyl Solution, 1993)
- The Singles (Vinyl Solution, 1994)
- Phantasmagoria (Unreleased 1994)
- Twilights Last Gleaming (Words of Warning, 1997)
- International Rescue (CD on Words of Warning, 2000)
- International Rescue (2xLP on Naked Ape Records / Underground United 2017)
- Black Lebanon Volume 1 (Underground United/Ventilate Records, 2024)

=== Compilations ===
- Construct Destruct on Underground United Vol. 1 (Naked Ape Records / Underground United, 2009)
- Bullet Entering Chest (Original Version) on Underground United Vol. 2 (Naked Ape Records / Underground United, 2011)
- Average New Yorker on Underground United Vol. 3 (Naked Ape Records / Underground United, 2016)

=== Remixes ===
- Senser – "Age of Panic (The Sick Man Remix)" (Ultimate Records 1994)
- Pitchshifter – "Triad (Gunshot Remix)" on the remix album The Remix War along with Therapy? & Biohazard (Earache 1994)
- Die Krupps – "Crossfire (Gunshot Remix)" on the album Fatherland (Cleopatra 1995)
- Hoodwink – "Dun' Like A Kipper (Gunshot Mix)" (Mute Records 1997)
- Chumbawamba – "Tubthumping (Gunshot Mix)" (EMI 1997)

=== Guest appearances ===
- Depth Charge – "Depth Charge vs Silver Fox" (Vinyl Solution, 1991)
- B.R.O.T.H.E.R. Congress – "Ghettogedden" (1992)
- Killa Instinct – "No More Need For Whispering (No conspiracy)" ft. Gunshot and Tones Of Twice (Move, 1996) The Penultimate Sacrfice EP)
- DJ White Child Rix – scratching on Chumbawamba's album WYSIWYG (EMI, 2000)
- Aspects – "Chase The Devil" ft MC Alkaline (Sanctuary Records 2004) Mystery Theatre? LP
- DJ Snuff - "Hip Hop Blues" ft MC Mercury (Dented, 2008)

=== Music videos ===
- "Battle Creek Brawl" (1990)
- "Crime Story" (1991)
- "Mind of a Razor" (1994)
- "Sulphur" (2018)
- "Burn Cycle" (2020)
- "Alkaline" (2024)
- "I Mercury" (2024)
- "GHETTO HEART BEAT VIDEO" (2024)
