= Genius (Pitchshifter song) =

1997 single by Pitchshifter

Single by Pitchshifter

from the album www.pitchshifter.com
- Released: 1998
- Recorded: 1997
- Genre: Nu metal; industrial metal; big beat
- Length: 4:06
- Label: Geffen
- Songwriter(s): JS Clayden, Mark D. Clayden, Johnny A. Carter

Pitchshifter singles chronology
"Underachiever" (1996)	"Genius" (1998)	"Microwaved" (1998)

"Genius" is a song by British industrial metal band Pitchshifter, released in 1997, from their album www.pitchshifter.com. It is usually considered one of the key songs that helped the band be successful, and is one of their most recognized songs.

== Song information ==
Musically speaking, "Genius" can be considered a departure from previous songs from the band. It has a rock-influenced sound, with elements of dance music. Vocals also, are cleaner than previous releases.

The song was used in the 1998 PlayStation racing video game Test Drive 5, and is played in the movie Mortal Kombat Annihilation, as well as appearing on the movie's soundtrack.

== Music video ==
In the music video directed by The Dempsey Twins, Ben Dempsey & Joe Dempsey, Pitchshifter are performing in a warehouse and are confronted by the riot police. Throughout the video, the music appears to deter the police, whilst destroying their helmets. Near the end, a police officer sprays water at the band. The video ends with the police using signal flares. Made in 1997, it was shot at a disused warehouse in South London, England. The music video later won the Kerrang! Awards in 1998 for Best Video. It was also featured in the intro for Test Drive 5, though severely edited to include scenes of cars racing and driving, complete with added noises of car noises and other small features akin to racing.

== Track listing ==
Version 1

This one was released by City of Angels Records as a 12".

1. "Genius (Lunatic Calm Mix)"
2. "Genius (Deejay Punk-Roc Vocalicious Mix)"
3. "Genius (Whatever Remix)"

Other versions were released through Geffen Records as the following

Version 2

1. "Genius (Lunatic Calm Mix)"
2. "Genius (Deejay Punk-Roc Vocaliscious Mix)"
3. "Genius (Whatever Mix)"
4. "Genius (Luke Vibert Mix)"
5. "Genius (LP version)"

Version 3

1. "Genius (edited)"
2. "Genius (LP Version)"

Version 4

1. "Genius (Edit)"
2. "Floppy Disk"
3. "Genius (Luke Vibert Mix)"
4. "You Are Free (To Do As We Tell You)"

Version 5

1. "Genius (LP Version)"
2. "Making Plans for Nigel" (XTC cover)

== Charts ==
Chart (1998)	Peak position
Scotland (OCC)	77
UK Singles (OCC)	71
