= P.S.I.entology =

Video by Pitchshifter
- Released: October 12, 2004
- Genre: Industrial metal
- Length: 90 minutes
- Label: PSI Records
- Director: Pitchshifter
- Producer: Pitchshifter

Professional ratings
Review scores
Source	Rating
Blistering	9/10 stars
Crossfire	Favourable

P.S.I.entology was the only DVD release from the British band Pitchshifter. The DVD was the second release from PSI Records which is run by members Mark Clayden and J.S. Clayden. The DVD was released ostensibly as a "thank you" to the band's loyal fan base. The release prompted the band to reform after their 2003 split to take part in a seven date tour of Britain in October of 2004.

== Track listing ==
=== Live Concert - Nottingham Rock City ===
1. "Wafer Thin"
2. "Chump Change"
3. "Genius"
4. "Condescension"
5. "Virus"
6. "Dead Battery"
7. "Triad"
8. "Hidden Agenda"
9. "Microwaved"
10. "Please Sir"
11. "Un-United Kingdom"
12. "What's In It For Me?"
13. "W.Y.S.I.W.Y.G."

=== Video Clips ===
1. "Genius"
2. "Hidden Agenda"
3. "Shutdown"

=== Audio Remixes ===
1. "Genius (Sharper Mix)"
2. "Keep It Clean (OBNY Remix)"
3. "Microwaved (Teflon Remix)"
4. "Misdirection (Logan Mader Remix)"
5. "As Seen On TV (Martin Atkins Remix)"
6. "Stop Talking (So Loud) (OBNY Remix)"

=== Unreleased Songs ===
1. "Drive Me" by JS Clayden side project Doheny
2. "Sans Chorus" by Mark Clayden side project The Blueprint
3. "Grand Banks" by Drawbacks
4. "Dead Man" by Mark Clayden and Jason Bowld side project This Is Menace
