= Un-United Kingdom =

EP by Pitchshifter
- Released: September 6, 1999
- Genre: Industrial rock
- Label: MCA Records, Alternative Tentacles
- Producer: Pitchshifter

Pitchshifter chronology
www.pitchshifter.com (1998)	Un-United Kingdom (1999)	Deviant (2000)

Un-United Kingdom is an EP released by Pitchshifter in 1999. The EP is dedicated to band's good friend, Ken Owen from Carcass, who suffered a severe intracerebral hemorrhage and spent ten months in a coma before ultimately recovering.

In January 2020, the band announced they were releasing a "redux" of the song, with additional guest vocals, to coincide with the day of Brexit.

== Track listing ==
No.	Title	Length
1.	"Un-United Kingdom"	3:41
2.	"Everything Sucks (Again)"	4:28
3.	"Kerosene (Big Black cover)"	4:22
4.	"Un-United Kingdom (Fuzz Townshend mix)"	3:48
Total length:		16:19

Un-United Kingdom 20th Anniversary Brexit Edition
No.	Title	Length
1.	"Un-United Kingdom (feat. Burton C. Bell, Ginger Wildheart, Jason Perry, Mikee Goodman, Colin Doran and Karl Middleton)"	3:38
2.	"Un-United Kingdom (feat. Burton C. Bell)"	3:40
3.	"Un-United Kingdom (feat. Colin Doran)"	3:40
4.	"Un-United Kingdom (feat. Ginger Wildheart)"	3:40
5.	"Un-United Kingdom (feat. Jason Perry)"	3:40
6.	"Un-United Kingdom (feat. Karl Middleton)"	3:40
7.	"Un-United Kingdom (feat. Mikee Goodman)"	3:40
8.	"Un-United Kingdom (Set Me On Fire Mix) (feat. Ginger Wildheart)"	3:40
9.	"Un-United Kingdom (Wolf Type Dog Mix)"	4:26
Total length:		33:43

== Personnel ==
Pitchshifter

- Vocals - J.S. Clayden
- Guitar - Jim Davies
- Bass - Mark Clayden
- Drums - Jason Bowld

Production

- Artwork by J.S. Clayden and Unknown Graphic Services
- Engineered by Craig Chettle, Greg Marshall, J.S. Clayden and Johnny Carter
- Mastered by Tim Young
- Produced, mixed by Pitchshifter
- Written by Pitchshifter (tracks: 1, 2, 4), Big Black (track: 3)
