= DJ Hyper =

British DJ, producer and remixer (born 1977)

- Born: Guy James Hatfield; 23 February 1977 (age 49)
- Origin: Nottinghamshire, England
- Genres: Electronic; breakbeat; house; alternative dance
- Occupations: DJ, producer
- Instruments: Guitars, keyboards, programming, bass, drums
- Years active: 1999–present
- Labels: Kilowatt, Ayra Recordings, Distinctive Records, Bedrock Records
- Website: www.DJHyper.com

Guy James Hatfield (born 23 February 1977) better known by his stage name DJ Hyper or just Hyper, is a British DJ, producer and remixer, known for his use of live bass, guitars and uncompromising vocals. He has done remixes for artists such as BT and Paul Van Dyk and his music has been featured on TV and in trailers and video games.

Hyper has releases on labels such as Distinct'ive Breaks Records, Bedrock Records, and Positiva Recordings. He has also performed as a band featuring The Prodigy's members Leeroy Thornhill and Jim Davies along with co-producer John Ross on drums. Their first studio album We Control advanced Hyper to the stages of festivals, including Glastonbury, The Glade, the Sziget Festival in Hungary and Coliseo Ciudad de Atarfe in Spain. Their second album Suicide Tuesday was released in September 2008.

Hyper is currently under his own Kilowatt label.

== Music career ==
Hyper released his debut album We Control in 2005, where he incorporated live instrumentation such as guitars and bass and fused it with his newer electronic sound. The album led to a world tour, which included Fuji Rock Festival in Japan, Roskilde in Denmark and even Glastonbury in his native United Kingdom. In 2009, Hyper released the single "Pitch Bitch" with JHz on Kilowatt Recordings. The song was used on the trailer of the 2010 film The Losers. Also in 2009, Hyper released a remix of German electronic musician Pet's song "Cloud Nine".

In 2005, his music appeared in the video game Need for Speed Most Wanted and then again in the 2013 game Need for Speed Rivals. He also remixed The Sims 2's original score for the Nightlife expansion pack.

In 2006, he made a track for the video game MotorStorm entitled "Hot Rockin'", which seems to be a different take on his similar track "Replica". "Hot Rockin'" was made exclusively for MotorStorm and never officially released anywhere.

In 2008, his track "Replica" was featured in the video game Midnight Club: Los Angeles. It was also featured in the 2010 direct-to-video vampire film Lost Boys: The Thirst.

On 28 March 2011, Hyper released a new single, "The End", taken from his third album, The Panic, which itself was released in April 2011 via Distinctive Records.

In 2013, Hyper released his best-selling album to date, Lies, where he experimented with the power of dynamic and strings elements. The album received worldwide acclaim. In 2014, Hyper released an orchestral re-interpretation of 8 tracks featured in Lies to create “Symphony of Lies” in collaboration with Chris White. In 2018, "Spoiler" from Lies was featured in the E3 trailer for the video game Cyberpunk 2077 from CD Projekt Red.

Hyper's music has been featured in television shows such as Orange is the New Black and Leftovers. It was also featured in the advertising campaign for the movie, Blade Runner 2049.

== Discography ==
=== Studio albums ===
- 2006: We Control
- 2008: Suicide Tuesday
- 2011: The Panic
- 2012: The Panic (Instrumentals)
- 2013: Lies
- 2014: Symphony of Lies
- 2015: Bully

=== Remix albums ===
- 2000: Y3K: Deep Progressive Breaks
- 2000: Y3K: Soundtrack to the Future
- 2001: Bedrock Breaks
- 2003: Bedrock Breaks - Fractured
- 2004: Wired
- 2006: Inthemix Is Six (Along with Bass Kleph)
- 2007: Rewired

=== EPs ===
- 2006: Twisted Emotion
- 2007: Catnip
- 2008: Centre Attraction
- 2012: Machine
- 2019: Cyberpunk EP
- 2021: Control

=== Singles ===
- 1999: "Blaze It Up"
- 2003: "Catnip"
- 2003: "Slapper"
- 2004: "Outsider"
- 2005: "Come With Me"
- 2007: "No Rockstars"
- 2007: "Worst Case Scenario" (Hyper Vs. Victory Pill)
- 2009: "Pitch Bitch" (Kilowatt Recordings)
- 2011: "The End"
- 2011: "My World"
