= PSI (album) =

Studio album by Pitchshifter
- Released: 7 May 2002
- Genre: Nu metal, industrial rock, industrial metal
- Length: 56:06
- Label: Mayan/Sanctuary
- Producer: J.S. Clayden, Jim Davies, Machine

Pitchshifter chronology
Deviant (2000)	PSI (2002)	Bootlegged, Distorted, Remixed and Uploaded (2003)

Pitchshifter studio album chronology
Deviant (2000)	PSI (2002)

Professional ratings
Review scores
Source	Rating
AllMusic	4/5 stars
Collector's Guide to Heavy Metal	7/10
Kerrang!	4/5 stars
Metal Rules	3/5
NME	2/10
Playlouder	4/5 stars

PSI is the sixth and final studio album by the industrial metal band Pitchshifter, released in 2002. Their previous two albums had been released on a major label, but this was released by the minor Mayan Records, a subsidiary label owned by Sanctuary Records. "Eight Days" and "Shutdown" were released as singles.

== Track listing ==
No.	Title	Writer(s)	Length
1.	"Stop Talking (So Loud)"	JS Clayden, Jim Davies	4:21
2.	"Eight Days"	Clayden, Davies	3:34
3.	"My Kind"	Clayden, Davies	3:35
4.	"Misdirection"	Clayden, Davies	3:45
5.	"Down"	Clayden, Davies	3:07
6.	"Shutdown"	Clayden, Davies	3:24
7.	"Whatever"	Clayden, Davies	3:05
8.	"Screenshot"	Clayden, Davies	3:28
9.	"We Know"	Clayden, Davies	3:09
10.	"Super-Clean"	Clayden, Davies	3:10
11.	"Slip"	Clayden, Davies	4:16
12.	"Shen-an-doah" (Includes hidden track "Trancer")	Clayden, Davies	14:40

== Personnel ==
Pitchshifter

- J.S. Clayden – lead vocals, programming
- Jim Davies – guitars
- Mark Clayden – bass
- Jason Bowld – drums

Additional musicians

- Johnny Mingus – live double bass on "Stop Talking (So Loud)"
- Greg Marshall – Loony drum break on "Super-Clean"

Production

- Produced by J.S. Clayden, Jim Davies and Machine
- Additional sound design and synthesizer manipulation by Clinton Bradley
- Engineered by J.S. Clayden
- Programmed by J.S. Clayden, Dan Rayner and Tim Rayner
- Recorded by J.S. Clayden and Jim Davies
- Mixed by Machine
- Written by J.S. Clayden and Jim Davies

Artwork

- Sam Hayles / DOSE-productions.com
