= Rock City Crew =

The Rock City Crew (also known as the X-Treeme Team) were a group of breakdancers based in Nottingham in the 1980s. The crew was founded by Rock City nightclub DJ Jonathan Woodliffe. Woodliffe was involved in starting the successful Saturday afternoon hip hop jams at Rock City as well as the club night on Fridays which attracted people from across the UK. The Saturday afternoon jams were initially set up at the request of Trent FM, who later pulled out, and provided an opportunity for young kids to display their dancing skills.

== History ==
The Rock City Crew battled against breakdancing crews from across the country including crews with then to be legends such as drum and bass producer Goldie (West Side Crew and Bboys) and Take That member Jason Orange (Street Machine and Broken Glass Street Crew).

The 1983 crew members were:

- Sly
- Trix (a.k.a. Albert Thompson)
- Legz
- K.I.D.
- Prince Touche
- Wave Craze
- Horace Francis
- Calvin McLean
- Paul Bernard
- Patrick O'Connor
- Pepper T (a.k.a. Priscilla Angelique)

Members of the Rock City Crew were reunited during the making of the documentary film NG83 - When We Were B Boys which charts the rise of hip hop culture in 1980s Britain. They are also mentioned in John Robb's book 'The North Will Rise Again' which charts the history of music in Northern England.

Trix (a.k.a. Albert Thompson) went on to present the Channel 4 programme 'Trash Talk' and is regarded as a breakdancing legend. He continues to host breaking competitions around the world. Pepper T (a.k.a. Priscilla Angelique) went on to dance on TV shows like Dance Energy and Solid Soul. She became an academic, studying at Cambridge University among other universities and is a singer songwriter and dance music producer.
