= Industrial (album) =

Studio album by Pitch Shifter
- Released: 1 January 1991
- Recorded: September 1990 at Lion Studios, Leeds
- Genre: Industrial metal
- Length: 38:47
- Label: Peaceville

Pitch Shifter chronology
Industrial (1991)	Submit (1992)

Pitch Shifter studio album chronology
Industrial (1991)	Desensitized (1993)

Professional ratings
Review scores
Source	Rating
AllMusic	1.5/5 stars

Industrial is the debut album by the British industrial metal band Pitch Shifter. It was released in 1991 on Peaceville Records. It is the only Pitchshifter album featuring Mark Clayden on lead vocals. After Industrial was released, the band released a single "Death Industrial" with two new tracks that would later be released on Submit.

== Background ==
According to bassist and singer Mark Clayden the band "made the first album for £500 in a week in a shithole studio in Leeds." The album cover is a shot of Frank Booth's death in the film Blue Velvet. The deluxe edition of the album The Industrialist by American industrial metal band Fear Factory contains a cover of "Landfill".

== Track listing ==
No.	Title	Writer(s)	Length
1.	"Landfill"	Mark Clayden, Jonathan Alan Carter	3:50
2.	"Brutal Cancroid"	Carter, Clayden, Stuart E. Toolin	5:09
3.	"Gravid Rage"	Clayden, Carter	3:25
4.	"New Flesh"	Clayden, Carter	4:34
5.	"Catharsis"	Val	5:39
6.	"Skin Grip"	Clayden, Carter	5:19
7.	"Inflammator"	Clayden, Carter	4:10
8.	"Eye"	Clayden, Carter	6:44

1998 re-release bonus track
No.	Title	Writer(s)	Length
9.	"Gravid Rage (live)"	Clayden, Carter	3:28

== Personnel ==
=== Pitchshifter ===
- Mark Clayden – vocals, bass
- Stuart E. Toolin – rhythm guitar
- Johnny A. Carter – lead guitar
- J.S. Clayden – backing vocals

=== Technical personnel ===
- Paul Sludgefeast – artwork
- Mick A. – artwork
- Guy Hatton – engineering
- Nimbus – mastering
- Cath – Photography
