= Earthtone9 =

British metal band

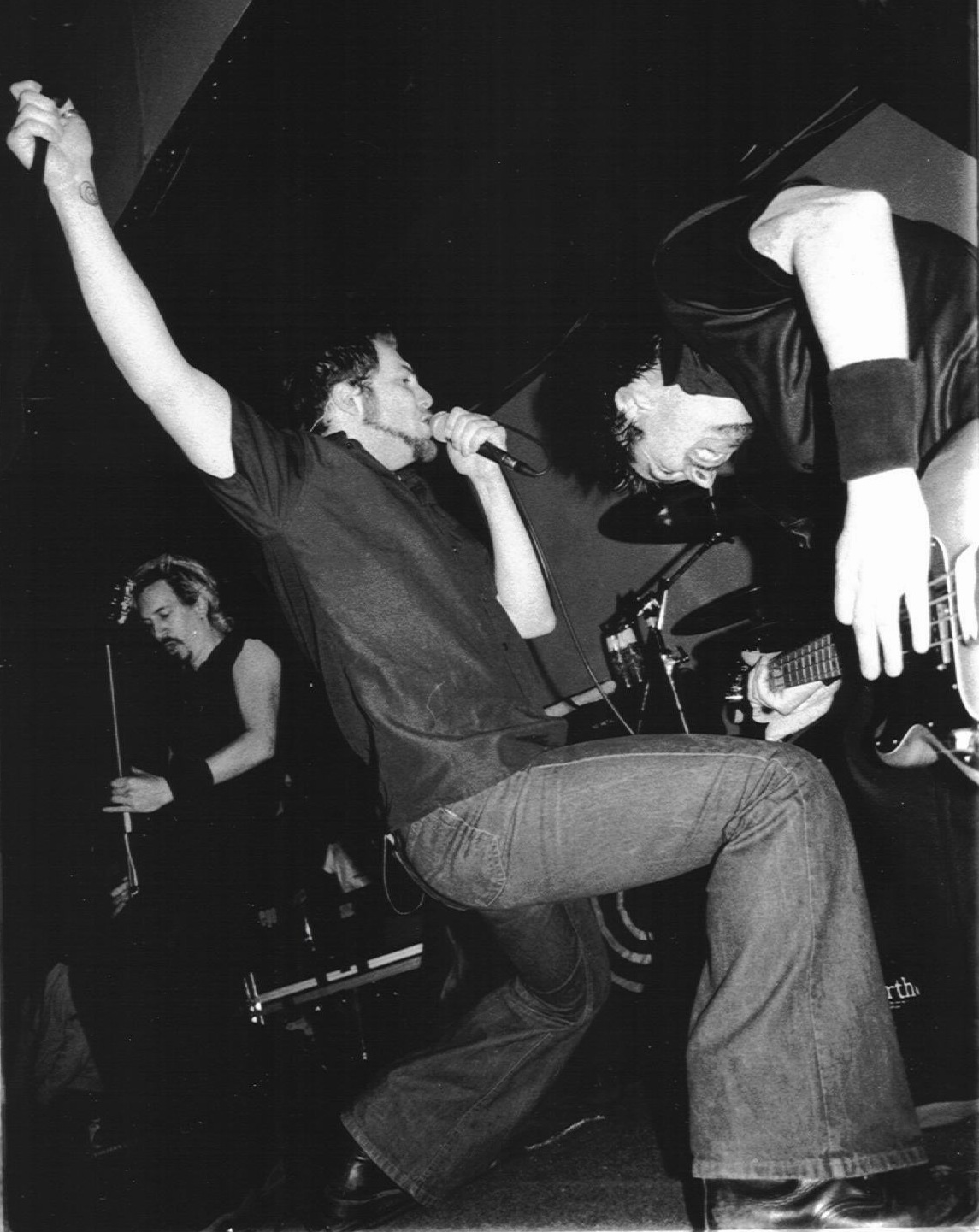
- Earthtone9 performing in 2002

Background information
- Origin: Nottingham, England
- Genres: Alternative metal
- Years active: 1998–2002, 2010–present
- Labels: Copro, Spinefarm Records, Candlelight
- Members: Karl Middleton; Owen Packard; Joe Roberts; Neil Kingsbury; Jay Walsh
- Past members: David Anderson; Alex Baker; Richie Mills; Jamie Floate; Graeme Watts; Simon Johnson; Justin Greaves; Gez Walton; Simon Hutchby
- Website: earthtone9.co.uk

Earthtone9 (stylised earthtone^{9}) is an English alternative metal band from Nottingham.

== History ==
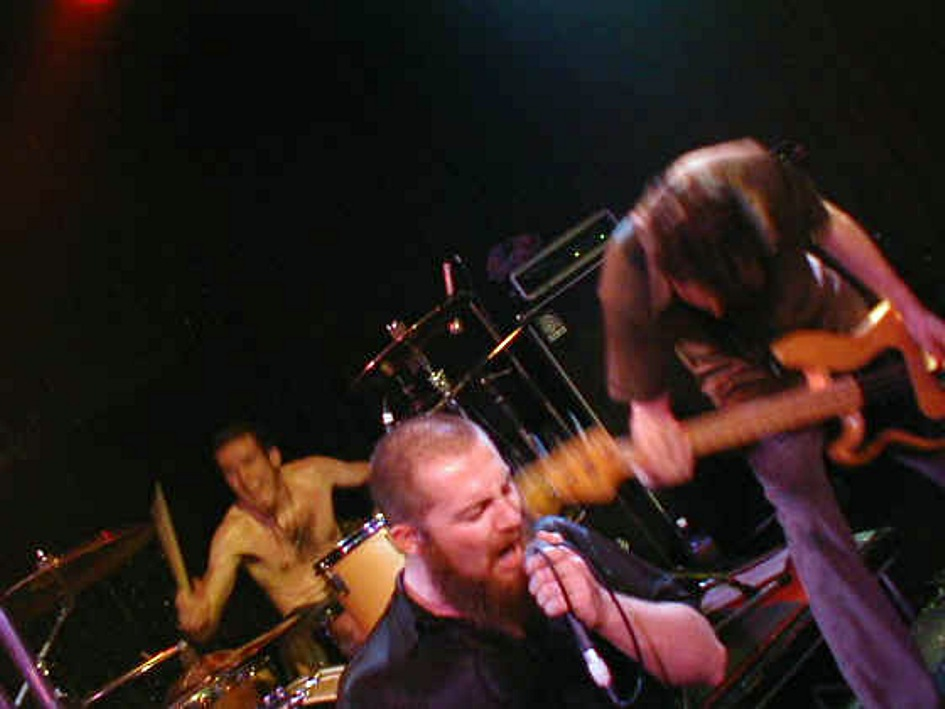
Earthtone9 performing in 2000

Signing to Copro Records in 1998, the band's first major release was the album Lo-Def(inition) Discord, which comprised songs from their three demos with a few new tracks. The record was produced on a budget of £500. Their harshest and noisiest recording, it quickly grabbed the attention of the British rock press, with favourable reviews in Terrorizer and Metal Hammer and a five-star rating in mainstream modern rock magazine Kerrang!

After extensive touring, ...Discord was followed in 1999 by Off Kilter Enhancement. Again it was a critical success, but commercial recognition was limited. The band had more time and money to play with this time, and it is here that the classic et9 sound crystallised – harsh metal inspired by Helmet and Neurosis, mixed with softer textured moments, with Tool-esque dynamics and arrangements, not to mention enigmatic song titles and lyrics (e.g. "Möe=ra (t-talk)", "i nagual eye"). Barely a year later, after the departure of original bassist Graeme Watts, who was replaced by David Anderson, the band delivered their third album – voted 16th best album of 2000 by Metal Hammer – Arc'tan'gent. It was described by the band as the first record they were truly happy with, having for the first time not been rushed in the recording process.

During a break in touring and rehearsing following the release of Arc'tan'gent, Karl Middleton briefly entered the studio to lay down additional vocals on a song called 'unhinged' by the rising post hardcore UK band Landmine Spring. The song featured on their first full-length album Elephantine, which was released in 2001 via Loudspeaker records, and also lead to Landmine Spring playing on Earthtone9's autumn tour.

Apart from some minor distribution of their existing material, attempts at an American record deal failed. The band announced their dissolution in early 2002. After their farewell tour, their rejected demo saw release as the Omega EP.

In 2004, Hi-Point (Rem), which was a remastered version of 2000's first EP Hi-Point, was released.

=== Post-break-up ===
All members continued to play in other bands – notably, Karl Middleton joined hardcore supergroup the Blueprint.

Furthermore, Middleton and Simon Hutchby are now in Twin Zero, and Middleton is also in the Brighton-based band Blackstorm, as well as providing guest vocals on "Alpha Signal Three", a track on the British rock band Reuben's second album Very Fast Very Dangerous. Owen Packard has played guitar and guested on the This Is Menace track "No End in Sight".

=== Reunion ===
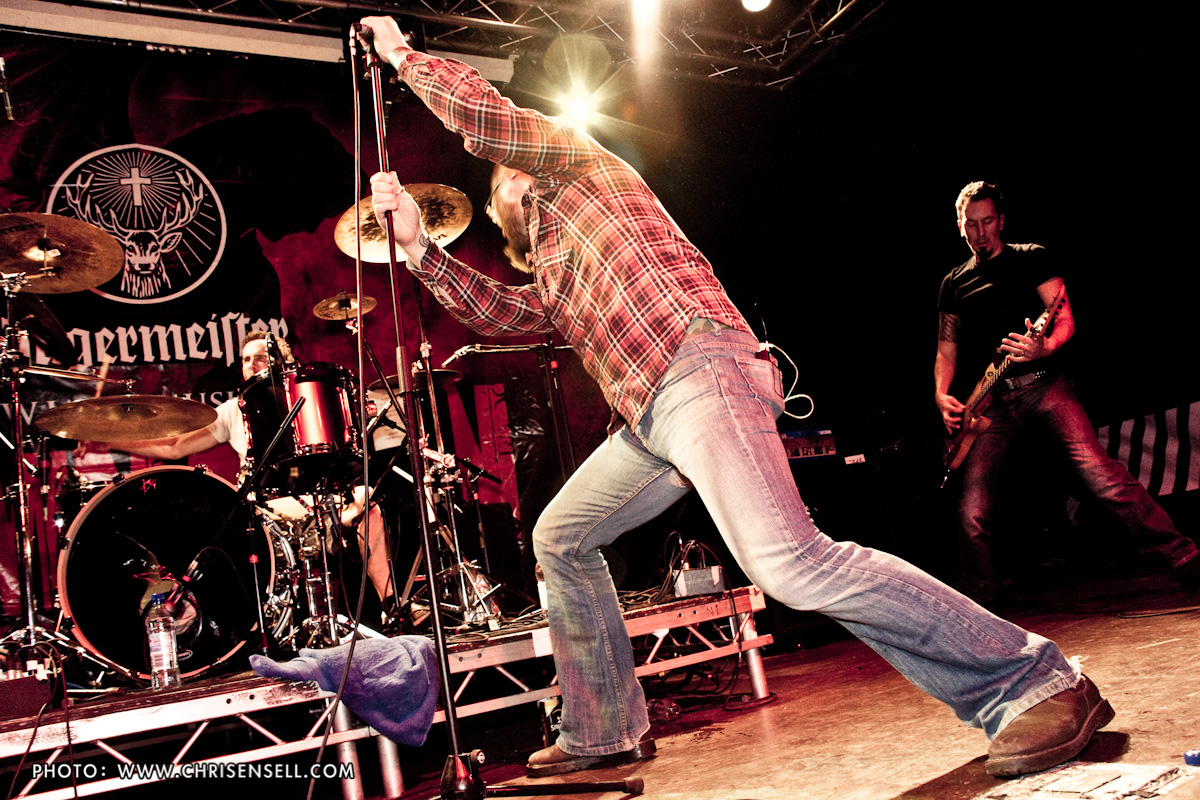
Earthtone9 at Damnation Festival 2010 in Leeds

In May 2010, the band announced they were reforming "to play a handful of gigs to remind everyone just how good they were". A great hits compilation, Inside, Embers Glow..., was released for free download in July 2010. Their first announcement of a new gig came at the end of May when they were the first band confirmed for the 2010 edition of the Damnation Festival. Their first gig however was at Sonisphere Festival on Saturday 31 July 2010. On Sunday 30 January 2011, Earthtone9 announced that they will be embarking on a six date United Kingdom tour with The Ocean Collective, Maybeshewill and Humanfly.

Earthtone9 announced that they were searching for supporters through Pledge Music for their new EP For Cause and Consequence that features four new songs which at the time were already in production. The EP was released on 16 May 2011 featuring 4 new tracks; "Tide of Ambition", "Ghosts", "The Trail That We Carved Out" and "Reborn". The EP was available for download for fans who had contributed via the Pledge Music scheme. The download also featured videos for "Tat Twam Asi", "Evil Crawling I" and new track, "Tide of Ambition".

Their fourth full-length album, titled IV was released in April 2013 to highly positive critical acclaim. The band also reformed to support Pitchshifter for a short UK tour in 2018, and joined the 2020 line-up for the experimental music festival ArcTanGent Festival.

On 26 July 2022, it was announced on the bands Facebook page that they are going back into hibernation as of immediate effect. "We're calling time on the idea of releasing new material, and playing the odd show just isn't working out. We've all got new musical projects going on and the time feels right to draw a line under this and do new things."

=== Fifth album ===
On 21 March 2024, the band announced the development of their fifth album, In Resonance Nexus, scheduled for release on 21 June 2024. The album announcement was accompanied by confirmation of the first single from the album, "Oceanic Drift".

== Musical style and reception ==
Stylistically, Earthtone9 combines a wide variety of influences from rock, metal, noise and hardcore. Characteristic are the constant mood changes within individual songs and albums. Often, heaviness and oppressive moments are combined with harmony and melody. A large number of critics attested to earthtone9's creativity and innovative spirit. The band is sometimes attributed cult status. Guitarist Joe Roberts named bands such as Alice in Chains, Carcass, Faith No More, Helmet, Metallica, Monster Magnet and The Police among his influences.

== Band members ==
Current

- Karl Middleton – vocals (1998–2002, 2010–present)
- Owen Packard – guitars (1998–2002, 2010–present)
- Joe Roberts – guitars (1998–1999, 1999–2002, 2010–2012, 2023–present)
- Jay Walsh – drums (2024–present)

Former

- Dave Anderson – bass (2000–2002, 2010–2012)
- Alex Baker – drums (2001–2002)
- Richie Mills – drums (2001)
- Jamie Floate – bass (2000)
- Graeme Watts – bass (1998–2000)
- Simon Johnson – guitars (1999)
- Justin Greaves – drums (1998)
- Russ Stedman – bass (2012–2016)
- Gez Walton – guitars (2012–2023)
- Simon Hutchby – drums (1998–2001, 2010–2023)
- Neil Kingsbury – bass (2016–2024)

Session musicians

- Jason Bowld – drums (2024)

Timeline

== Discography ==
=== Albums ===
- Lo-Def(inition) Discord (24 August 1998)
- Off Kilter Enhancement (19 July 1999)
- Arc'tan'gent (25 September 2000)
- IV (8 April 2013)
- In Resonance Nexus (21 June 2024)
- Six (TBC) (2026)

=== EPs ===
- Hi-Point (10 April 2000)
- Omega (8 April 2002)
- Hi-Point (rem) (23 August 2004)
- For Cause & Consequence (16 May 2011)
- Beware The Fury Of The Patient Man (2 May 2026)

=== Live albums ===
- Live from London Garage (31 July 2012)

=== Compilation albums ===
- Inside, Embers Glow... a Collection of Earthtone9's Aural Communiqués 1998-2002 (1 June 2010)

=== Music videos ===
- "Tat Twam Asi" (2000)
- "Amnesia" (2002)
- "Evil Crawling I" (2010)
- "Tide of Ambition" (2011)
- "Preacher" (2013)
- "Oceanic Drift" (2024)
- "Navison Record" (2024)
