= Arc'tan'gent =

arc'tan'gent

Studio album by earthtone9
- Released: 25 September 2000
- Recorded: 2000
- Studios: Philia Studios, Henley-on-Thames; Backstage, Ripley, Derbyshire
- Genre: Alternative metal
- Label: Copro
- Producer: Andy Sneap

Earthtone9 chronology
Hi-Point (2000)	arc'tan'gent (2000)	Omega (2000)

Professional ratings
Review scores
Source	Rating
Drowned in Sound	10/10
The Encyclopedia of Popular Music	4/5 stars
Kerrang!	4/5 stars
Metal Hammer	9/10
Rock Hard	9.5/10
Rock Sound	5/5 stars
Terrorizer	8.5/10

arc'tan'gent is the third album by British metal band earthtone9. The album received critical acclaim on its release. It was rated #16 in both Metal Hammer and Rock Sound magazines' "Albums of 2000" polls, and #24 in Terrorizer's equivalent poll. It was also voted #79 by the readers of Kerrang! in their 2005 readers' poll of the 100 best British rock albums ever. In 2024, Dom Lawson of Blabbermouth.net wrote that the album was "regarded as one of the great British metal records of [its] era."

== Track listing ==
- All tracks written by earthtone9, except where noted.
1. "Tat Twam Asi" – 5:32
2. "Evil Crawling I" – 2:55
3. "P.R.D Chaos" – 5:23
  - Guest vocals by Ishmael Lewis of Liberty 37
4. "Approx. Purified"
5. "Walking Day" – 7:25
6. "Star Damage for Beginners" – 2:58
7. "Ni9e - This Is the Sound..." – 1:23
  - Additional drums by Gemma Seddon
8. "Yellow Fever" (earthtone9/Lewis) – 5:06
  - Guest vocals and lyrics by Ishmael Lewis
9. "Alpha Hi" – 4:05
10. "Binary101" – 8:29
