= The Remix War =

Remix album by Pitch Shifter
- Released: 24 January 1995
- Recorded: August 1994
- Studio: Square Centre Studios; Sun Studios; Monroe's Studio; Electric Lady Studios, New York
- Genre: Industrial metal, drum and bass
- Length: 31:08
- Label: Earache
- Producer: Pitch Shifter, Therapy?, White Child Rix, Billy Graziadei

Pitch Shifter chronology
Desensitized (1993)	The Remix War (1995)	Infotainment? (1996)

Professional ratings
Review scores
Source	Rating
Allmusic	2.5/5 stars
Audio Drudge	Mixed
Collector's Guide to Heavy Metal	4/10

The Remix War is a remix album by Pitch Shifter, released in 24 January 1995 by Earache. The EP is composed of remixes of select songs from Pitchshifter's prior release, Desensitized. The bands who worked on the remixes were Therapy?, Gunshot, and Biohazard.

== Track listing ==
All tracks are written by Pitchshifter

No.	Title	Length
1.	"Triad (Pitch Shifter Remix)"	3:33
2.	"Diable (Therapy? Remix)"	5:41
3.	"N.C.M. (Pitch Shifter Remix)"	3:35
4.	"Triad (Gunshot Remix)"	3:27
5.	"Diable (Pitch Shifter Remix)"	4:53
6.	"Triad (Biohazard Remix)"	4:12
7.	"To Die is Gain (Pitch Shifter Remix)"	5:47

=== Japanese edition bonus tracks ===
No.	Title	Length
8.	"Triad (Gunshot Remix) (Instrumental)"	3:25
9.	"Triad (Biohazard Remix) (Instrumental)"	3:47

== Personnel ==
=== Pitchshifter ===
- J.S. Clayden – vocals, production (1, 3, 5, 7)
- J.A. Carter – guitar, programming, production (1, 3, 5, 7)
- M.D. Clayden – bass, production (1, 3, 5, 7)
- 'D'.J. Walters – percussion, production (1, 3, 5, 7)

=== Technical personnel ===
- Jase Cooper – pre-production assistant (1, 3, 5, 7)
- Ric Peet – engineering (1, 3, 5, 7)
- Tim Boland – engineering (2)
- Lorcan Cousins – assistant engineering (2)
- No Sleep Nigel – engineering (4)
- White Child Rix – production (4)
- John Travis – engineering (6)
- A. Salas – assistant engineering (6)
- Billy Graziadei – production (6)
- Omni-Design – cover design
