= Live at Nottingham Rock City =

Live album by Tygers of Pan Tang
- Released: 10 February 2001
- Recorded: Rolling Stones' Mobile, April 1981
- Genre: Heavy metal
- Length: 58:25
- Label: Edgy / Spitfire

Tygers of Pan Tang chronology
Live at Wacken (2001)	Live at Nottingham Rock City (2001)	Live in the Roar (2003)

Professional ratings
Review scores
Source	Rating
Allmusic	3/5 stars

Live at Nottingham Rock City is a live album by the British heavy metal band Tygers of Pan Tang, recorded in April 1981 and not released until 2001.

== Track listing ==
1. "Take It" - 4:36
2. "Rock and Roll Man" - 2:42
3. "Blackjack" - 3:00
4. "Tyger Bay" - 3:26
5. "Insanity" - 5:17
6. "Euthanasia" - 3:52
7. "Mirror" - 4:45
8. "Wild Catz" - 3:08
9. "Money" - 3:59
10. "Don't Stop By" - 3:49
11. "Gangland" - 3:52
12. "Silver and Gold" - 3:25
13. "Hellbound" - 3:52
14. "Slave to Freedom" - 5:30
15. "All or Nothing" - 3:12 (Small Faces cover)

== Personnel ==
Band members

- John Deverill - vocals
- John Sykes - guitars
- Robb Weir - guitars
- Rocky - bass
- Brian Dick - drums

Production

- Chris Tsangarides - engineer
- Fred Purser - mixing
