= This Is Menace =

British metalcore band

- Origin: United Kingdom
- Genres: Metalcore; alternative metal; nu metal
- Years active: 2004–2008; 2020
- Labels: PSI, Fourth Wall
- Spinoff of: Pitchshifter
- Past members: Jason Bowld; Mark Clayden; Lee Erinmez; Paul Fletcher; Gerald Walton; Owen Packard

This Is Menace was a British metalcore supergroup formed in 2004. Metal Hammer has called the band "the most underrated metal supergroup of the 2000s".

== History ==
The band was formed by bassist Mark Clayden and drummer Jason Bowld during the hiatus of their previous band, Pitchshifter. The group released their limited EP, Collusion in 2005. Shortly after that the band released their debut album No End in Sight in April 2005 through J.S. Clayden's PSI Records, receiving generally positive reviews. In December 2005, the band performed with 12 vocalists at the Mean Fiddler in London. In 2006, the band performed at the Download Festival at Donington Park.

The band released their second album, The Scene Is Dead, in 2007, along with the Emotion Sickness DVD, featuring live shows and a "making of" segment. In October 2007, the band embarked on an eight-date tour of the United Kingdom. In 2008, the project was terminated.

In 2020, Pitchshifter's social media accounts announced a final This Is Menace album entitled isM; the album is a compilation of songs from the two previous albums, with one additional unreleased song called "Redisposed".

== Members ==
Last line-up

- Jason Bowld – drums, lead guitar, rhythm guitar vocals
- Mark Clayden – bass, lead guitar, rhythm guitar, vocals
- Lee Erinmez – bass
- Paul Fletcher – guitar
- Gerald Walton – guitar
- Owen Packard – guitar

Guest vocalists

- Jaz Coleman of Killing Joke
- B'Hellmouth of Send More Paramedics
- Charlie Simpson of Fightstar
- J.S. Clayden of Pitchshifter
- Ben Woosnam of Hondo Maclean
- Colin Doran of Hundred Reasons
- Matt Davies of Funeral for a Friend
- Justin Hill of SikTh
- Mikee Goodman of SikTh
- Casey Chaos of Amen
- Paul McCallion of Hiding Place
- Jeffrey Walker of Carcass
- Andy Cairns of Therapy?
- Tom Lacey of The Ghost of a Thousand
- Karl Middleton of earthtone9
- Paul Catten of Murder One
- Mark Greenway of Napalm Death
- Justin Sullivan of New Model Army
- Anthony Giles of Here There Be Monsters

== Discography ==
Studio albums

- No End in Sight (2005)
- The Scene Is Dead (2007)

Compilations

- isM (2020)

EP

- Collusion (2005)

DVD

- Emotion Sickness (2007)

== Artwork ==
This Is Menace album and DVD artwork by DOSE-productions.
