= Bootlegged, Distorted, Remixed and Uploaded =

Bootlegged, Distorted, Remixed & Uploaded

Compilation album by Pitchshifter
- Released: 2003
- Genre: Industrial rock Industrial metal Drum and bass
- Label: PSI Records

Pitchshifter chronology
PSI (2002)	Bootlegged, Distorted, Remixed & Uploaded (2003)	None for All and All for One [EP] (2006)

Bootlegged, Distorted, Remixed & Uploaded is a compilation album by English metal band Pitchshifter. It was released in 2003, on their own label, PSI Records.

It comprises two discs. The first disc is a live album, depicting a concert played by the band at the London Astoria in 2002. The second disc is a compilation of remixes.

The artwork was made by DOSE-productions.com.

== Track listing ==
=== Disc one ===
1. "Triad"
2. "Eight Days"
3. "Microwaved"
4. "Hidden Agenda"
5. "My Kind"
6. "What's In It For Me?"
7. "Genius"
8. "Shutdown"
9. "We Know"
10. "Keep It Clean"
11. "Down"
12. "W.Y.S.I.W.Y.G."
13. "Please Sir"

=== Disc two ===
1. "Stop Talking So Loud (I Don't Care What You Are Saying)"
2. "Eight Days (Heat Treatment Remix)"
3. "As Seen on TV (Martini Lounge Mix)"
4. "Down (Burning Down the House Mix)"
5. "Genius (Evil Axis Remix)"
6. "Misdirection (Dark Winter Remix)"
7. "My Kind (D.E.C. Mix)"
8. "Dead Battery (Nishtegea Remix)"
9. "Please Sir (Can I Go Now?)"
10. "Wafer Thin (Dead Mix)"
11. "Shen-an-doah (Edacious Empire Remix)"
12. "Misdirection (Laptops at Dawn Mix)"
