= Pitchshifter =

British industrial metal band

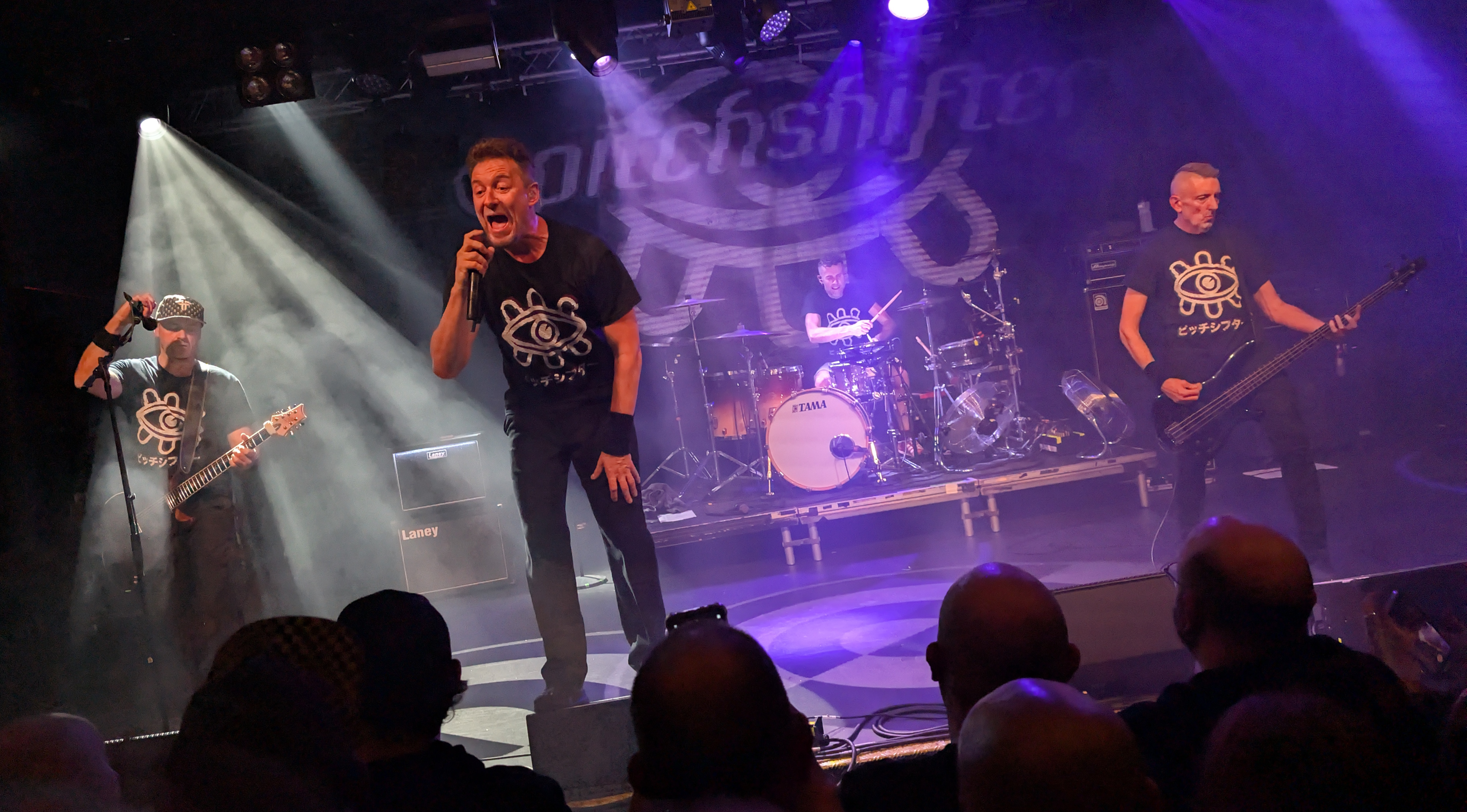
- Pitchshifter performing in 2024. Pictured from left: Dan Rayner, JS Clayden, Simon Hutchby and Mark Clayden (Tim Rayner not depicted).

Background information
- Also known as: Pitch Shifter
- Origin: Nottingham, England
- Genres: Industrial rock; industrial metal; nu metal; drum and bass
- Years active: 1989–2010, 2018–present
- Labels: Peaceville; Earache; Geffen; MCA; Sanctuary; PSI
- Spinoffs: This Is Menace
- Members: JS Clayden; Mark D. Clayden; Dan Rayner; Tim Rayner; Simon Hutchby
- Past members: Johnny A. Carter; Stuart Toolin; Jim Davies; Matt Grundy; D.J. Walters; Matt Godfrey; Jason Bowld

Pitchshifter (originally Pitch Shifter) are an English industrial rock band from Nottingham, formed in 1989. The band was started by lead guitarist and programmer Johnny A. Carter, and bassist and vocalist Mark Clayden. The band's early material was characterized for its gritty industrial metal sound with downtuned guitars and the use of drum machines, and has been cited as one of the originators of the genre along with Godflesh. With later albums the group's music became increasingly more melodic and strongly influenced by nu metal and drum and bass; particularly evident of their 1998 release www.pitchshifter.com, which has been compared with groups like The Prodigy.

Although Pitchshifter has found little mainstream success, the band managed to gain a platinum certification with the release of the Mortal Kombat: Annihilation soundtrack. Since its formation, the band has released six studio albums, three EPs and eight music videos. The band has played in various festivals around the world including Ozzfest, Phoenix Festival and Damnation Festival.

== History ==
=== Formation and Industrial (1989–1991) ===
Pitchshifter was formed in 1989 (initially spelled Pitch Shifter) by guitarist and programmer Johnny Carter and bassist Mark Clayden, later joined by Stu Toolin, and then Jon "JS" Clayden (Mark Clayden's brother). During this time, the band played with local bands and soon gained attention of the Peaceville Records. During this time, JS went to live in France to sell paintings.

They have cited major influences as Black Sabbath, Judas Priest, Metallica, Nine Inch Nails, Led Zeppelin, The Cure, The Doors, The Sex Pistols, The Ramones, and Ministry.

During 1990, the band started recording their début album, Industrial, with the main vocalist being Mark Clayden instead of JS, who contributed with backing vocals. The band later went on a small tour with bands like Napalm Death.

=== Submit, Desensitized and Phoenix Festival (1992–1995) ===
The band later joined the British label Earache Records where they released their mini-album/EP Submit. Later, Stuart Toolin left the band, and the band hired Matt Godfrey to fill his place for some shows. Matt later left the band and they hired drummer D.J. Walters, now being a four-piece band. Later, the band released their second album, Desensitized.

The band played at the Phoenix Festival in Long Marston, England, in 1995. The band's manager, armed with a tractor, arranged for an enormous crop circle replica of the band's famous "eye" symbol to appear in the adjoining field to the festival site during the night prior to their performance there. The crowd's enthusiasm for the band when they performed was so high that they rushed the stage, making Pitchshifter's performance the first in the history of the festival to be stopped early.

=== The Remix War and Infotainment? (1995–1996) ===
The band later released the remix album The Remix War, which had appearances from other groups like Biohazard, Therapy? and Gunshot. The band then started working on the third album, Infotainment? and later played at the Dynamo Open Air. The band later left Earache and joined Geffen Records.

=== Spelling change and www.pitchshifter.com (1997–1999) ===
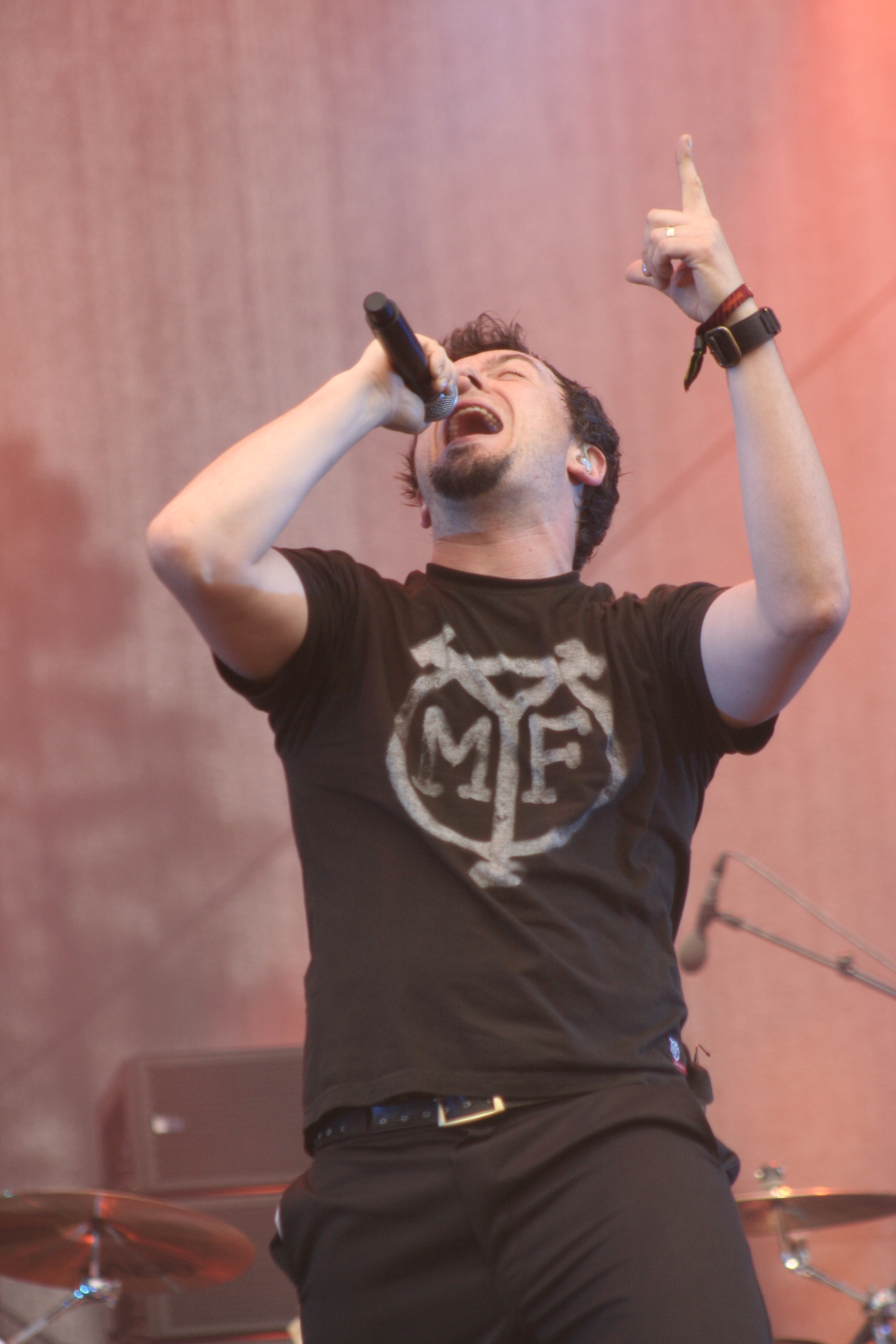
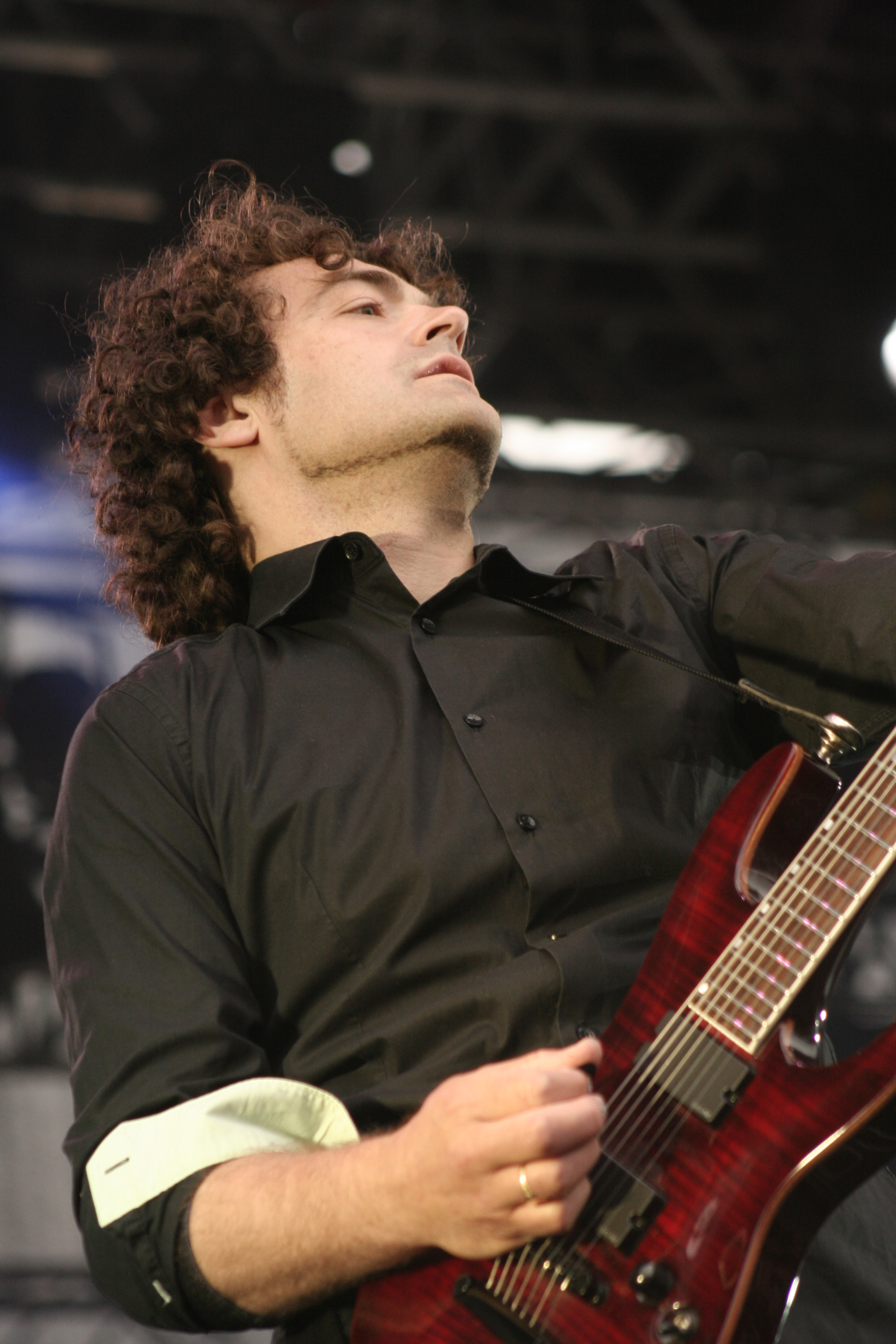
JS Clayden (left) and guitarist Dan Rayner in June 2008

As the band undertook a reorientation of its sound and image, the band's name was restyled from the two-word Pitch Shifter to the compounded Pitchshifter and recruited former The Prodigy live guitarist Jim Davies, returning to a five-piece lineup. During this period, the group also began to incorporate nu metal and drum and bass influences, genres that were prominent at the time, which were first showcased on the single "Genius". The track was later included in Test Drive 5 and the Mortal Kombat: Annihilation soundtrack, which helped the band to gain platinum recognition.

In 1998, the band released their fourth album www.pitchshifter.com, which is their best selling album, selling around 60,000 copies in the U.S. The band later played in Ozzfest 1998 and Livid in support of their album. During 1999, they played on Reading Festival and again at Dynamo.

=== Deviant (2000–2001) ===
In 2000, founder Johnny Carter and drummer D.J. Walters left the band, and the band hired guitarist Matt Grundy and drummer Jason Bowld. The band later released their fifth album Deviant, which had appearances from drummer John Stanier and Jello Biafra. The band played in that year's Ozzfest. The cover used a picture of one of Gee Vaucher's Paintings, who did artwork for Crass and Carcass. The painting shows a cross between the Pope John Paul II and Queen Elizabeth II. Due to outrage over the use of a caricature of the Pope, the album was banned in Poland. The band apologized for the artwork and changed it.

=== PSI and hiatus (2002–2003) ===
Live rhythm guitarist Matt Grundy announced his departure from the band in January 2002. The following month, Pitchshifter played their first show of the year at Ministry of Sound (London). This show marked the debut for guitarist Dan Rayner whom, along with his brother Tim, had previously worked with the band in 2001 as an additional programmer for the album PSI. This time serving as the group's touring rhythm guitar player (switching to live lead guitar in 2003). PSI - the sixth studio album was released on May 7, 2002. The band then went to a few more shows until their last show in 2003 when the band went on an "indefinite hiatus".

=== Side projects (2003–2006) ===
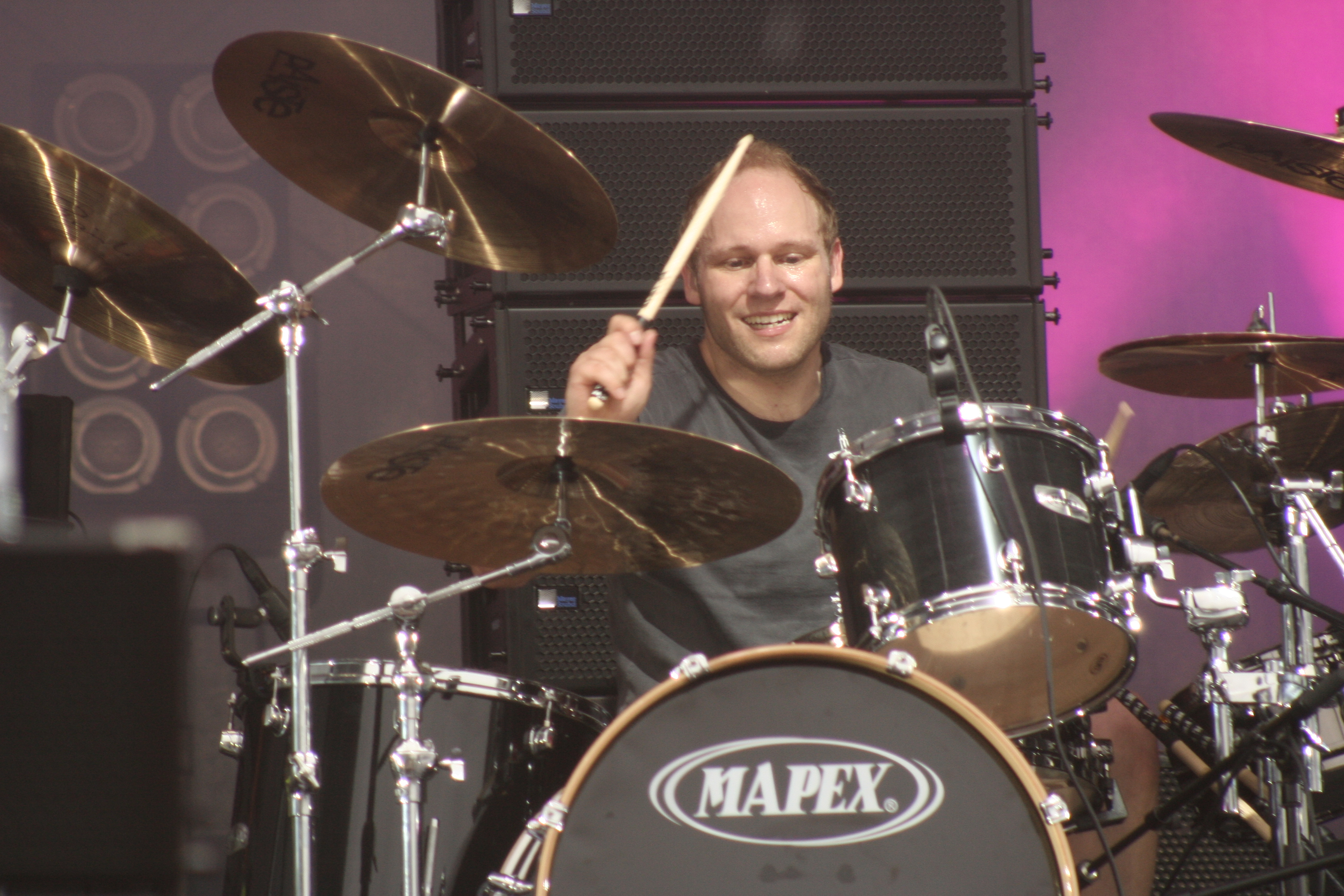
Drummer Jason Bowld in June 2008

During this time, Jim Davies returned to The Prodigy, while Dan went to work on Drawbacks, with his brother Tim Rayner, who later joined Pitchshifter as well. Jon formed the alternative rock group Doheny with former The Cult guitarist Billy Morrison. Mark later left The Blueprint and with Jason, they formed This Is Menace, a supergroup featuring members from various other bands including Carcass, Napalm Death, Sikth, Send More Paramedics, Funeral for a Friend and earthtone9.

Doheny later broke up and JS went to form his own label, PSI Records, and in 2003 released the compilation album Bootlegged, Distorted, Remixed and Uploaded and the DVD P.S.I.entology. In 2005, This Is Menace released their début album No End in Sight through PSI Records.

During this time as well, Jon worked as a teacher at the Los Angeles Recording School teaching Music Business Communications and was a featured member of Pigface during the supergroup's 2003 United II tour of the US. During the tour, he performed vocals on songs including Pigface's "Insect/Suspect" and Pitchshifter's classic "Genius."

=== Return and None for All and All for One (2006–2008) ===
During late 2006, there were rumours that band was going to return, which were later confirmed and the band announced the "Back From the Dead" tour, supported by various bands including Funeral for a Friend. Davies did not return to the band to pursue a solo career, and was replaced by Tim Rayner. The band released the None for All and All for One EP, with some copies given away for free in certain shows. There were some rumours that the band was working on a new album, but the band has denied.

In 2008, the band along with Carcass and Cathedral, headlined the Damnation Festival.

=== Hiatus (2009–2018) ===
In 2009, the band announced in their official website that they were working on a new album. Frontman JS Clayden stated that "It's been refreshing to get back in the demo studio. We are taking this record in a few places we haven't been before in terms of guitar work. Brian Harrah [Professional Murder Music and Tura Satana] is writing with me on guitar at The Manor Studios, and Jason is jamming at his place. So far we are having a blast and kicking ass. There are a few new moves in terms of song timing and vocals that have us all jazzed. I guess you'll just have to wait and see what we came up with." In late 2009, guitarist Tim Rayner was diagnosed with b cell lymphoma while on vacation in Australia and underwent treatment. In February 2010, he arrived in the UK and started radiotherapy. The band headlined the Wakefield Rock Festival on 15 May 2010.

The band's statement, made on their website in 2011, is "We're excited to be back in the studio. Looking at a 2012 release right now; but we're not under any pressure to finish on someone else's deadline - so we'll do it right and finish on our own schedule." However, no further updates were published, and in July 2015, the official website's domain had been purchased and replaced with a Japanese website unrelated to the band; years later, JS Clayden admitted that "we carried the website for such a long time that it felt like a burden being lifted to let it go".

=== Reunion tour and occasional shows (2018–present) ===
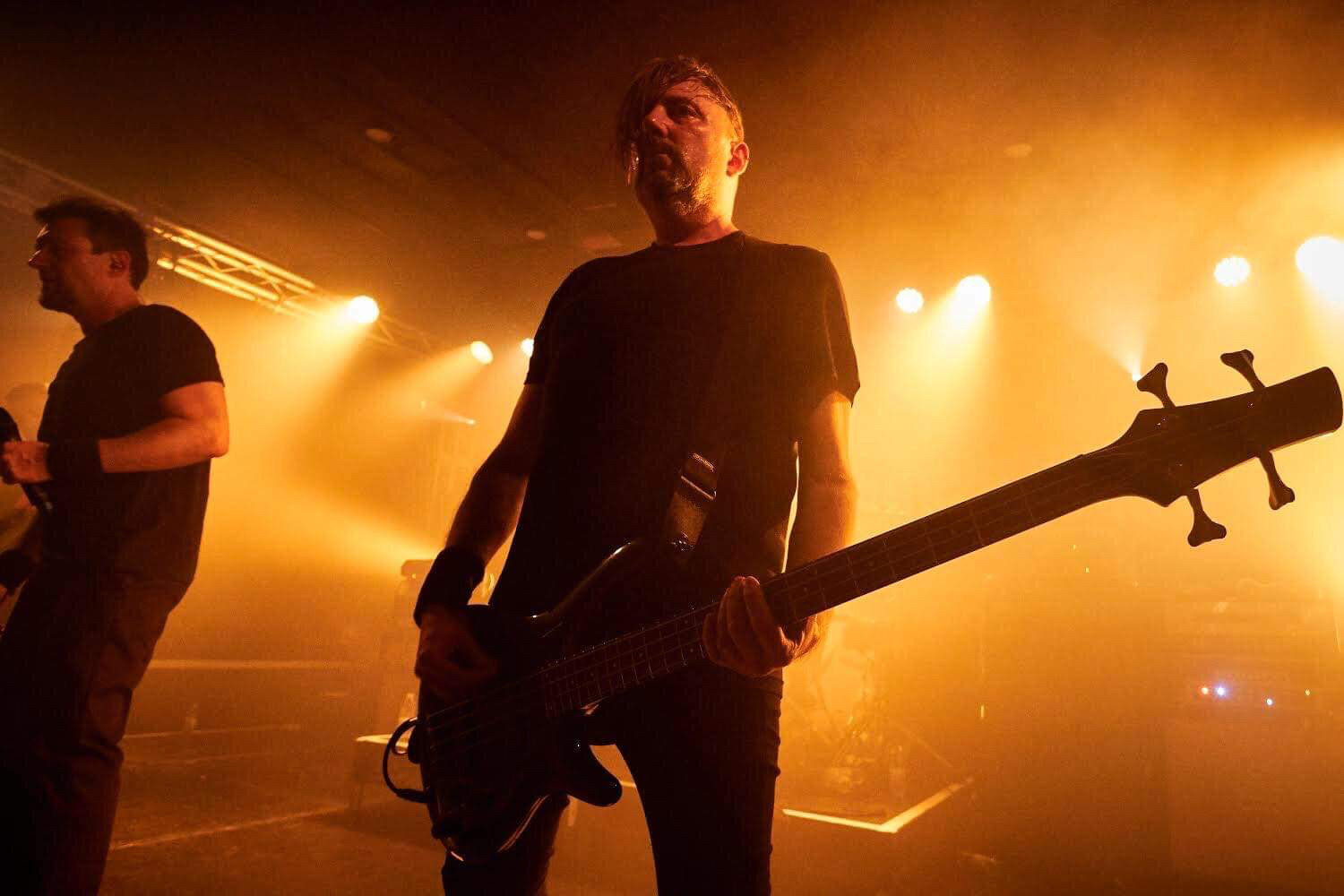
Clayden brothers performing in 2018

In June 2016, the band tweeted "Looking at some live shows in Feb 2018 in the UK". This was followed by an announcement in April 2018 that the band would reunite for a short tour the following November to coincide with the 20th anniversary of the www.pitchshifter.com album; Simon Hutchby from earthtone9 would be replacing Jason Bowld on drums, as Bowld could not break away his commitments with Bullet for My Valentine. When asked about a longer term reunion, J.S. Clayden emphasized that the current band members live in different cities and countries. Select demo material from the band's would-be seventh album, Sprint Finish, was released on the band's Bandcamp page.

In January 2020, the band announced they were releasing a "redux" of Un-United Kingdom, with additional guest vocals, to coincide with the day of Brexit. Jason Bowld and Mark Clayden guested on former guitarist Jim Davies' album Headwars.

In July 2020, the band released a re-recorded version of "Everything's Fucked" for the EFKD 2020 EP. Later that year, the band successfully crowdfunded though Kickstarter a retrospective diary book entitled Chasing The Broken White Line, chronicling the band's 1998 world tour; a sequel book, Tokyo or Bust, was announced in 2022.

In July 2023, the band re-joined to perform two shows in the UK, one of them as part of the 2000trees festival.

== Band members ==
Current members

- Mark Clayden – bass (1989–2010, 2018–present), lead vocals (1989–1991)
- JS Clayden – lead vocals, programming (1991–2010, 2018–present), backing vocals (1989–1991)
- Dan Rayner – lead guitar, backing vocals (2002–2010, 2018–present)
- Tim Rayner – rhythm guitar, backing vocals (2003–2010, 2018–present)
- Simon Hutchby – drums (2018–present)

Former members

- Johnny Carter – lead guitar, programming, editing (1989–1998)
- Stu Toolin – rhythm guitar (1989–1992)
- Jim Davies – lead guitar, backing vocals (1998–2002)
- D.J. Walters – drums (1993–2000)
- Jason Bowld – drums (2000–2010)

Former live members

- Matt Godfrey – rhythm guitar (1992)
- Matt Grundy – rhythm guitar (2000–2002)

Session musicians

- Keith York – drums (1997)
- John Stanier – drums (2000)

== Awards and nominations ==
Kerrang! Awards
Year	Nominee / work	Award	Result	Ref.
1998	"Genius"	Best Video	Won	
2000	Deviant	Best Album	Nominated	
2000	Pitchshifter	Best British Live Act	Nominated	
2000	Pitchshifter	Best British Band	Nominated	

Metal Hammer Readers' Poll
Year	Nominee / work	Award	Result	Ref.
2000	Pitchshifter	Best Overall Band	Nominated	
2000	Pitchshifter	Best UK Band	Nominated	
2000	Pitchshifter	Best Live Band	Nominated	
2000	Deviant	Best Album	Nominated	

== Discography ==
- Industrial (1991)
- Submit (1992)
- Desensitized (1993)
- Infotainment? (1996)
- www.pitchshifter.com (1998)
- Deviant (2000)
- PSI (2002)
