= JS Clayden =

British singer/songwriter

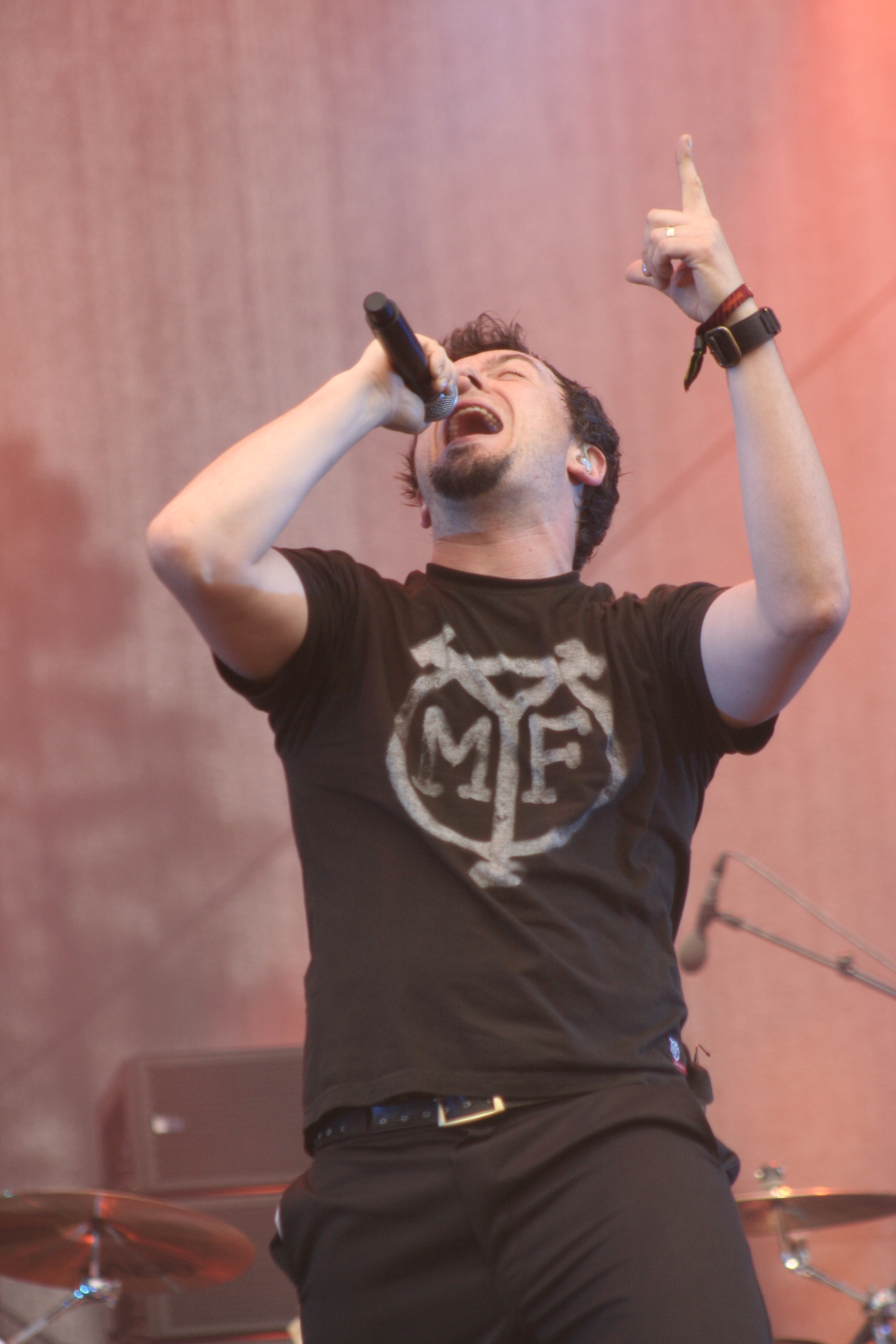

Background information
- Born: Jonathan Seth Clayden; 24 March 1971 (age 55)
- Origin: London, England
- Genres: Alternative rock, electronica, drum and bass, industrial metal, nu metal, death metal (early)
- Occupations: Producer, musician, vocalist
- Instruments: Vocals, programming
- Years active: 1989–present
- Label: PSI
- Member of: Pitchshifter
- Formerly of: Doheny

JS Clayden (born Jonathan Seth Clayden, 24 March 1971) is a British singer/songwriter. He is best known as the lead vocalist of the band Pitchshifter. He moved to several towns in the United Kingdom, settling in Nottingham, England, for a number of years before emigrating to Los Angeles, California. He is also the brother of Pitchshifter's bassist, Mark Clayden.

== Biography ==
In 1989, Clayden, along with his brother and bassist/programmer Mark Clayden, formed the musical group Pitchshifter (then called "Pitch Shifter"), going on to found PSI Records in 2002.

== Career ==
He has worked with producers such as Dave Jerden and Machine. Other collaborators include longtime friend Jello Biafra. He also completed remixes for bands like The Stereophonics, Prong, Clawfinger and Pigface. He has also commissioned a wide range of mixes from the likes of Rob Swift, Luke Vibert, DJ Punc Roc and Therapy?. He has also appeared on the This Is Menace album The Scene Is Dead, in the track "Cut Us (And We Bleed)".

JS was also, along with Billy Morrison, a founding member of Doheny, a short-lived indie rock band, based in California. The music was inspired by Led Zeppelin, Stone Temple Pilots and Incubus. The band split in 2005 after failing to secure a record deal.

Jonathan Clayden is now the Director of Graduate and Professional Education Programs and Services and Assistant Dean, Program & Enrollment Management, at Tseng College, California State University, Northridge.
