= Scopophobia (video) =

Video by Therapy?
- Released: 20 October 2003 (EU); 21 October 2003 (US); 27 October 2003 (UK)
- Genre: Alternative rock; alternative metal
- Length: 156 minutes
- Label: Eagle Vision, Eagle Rock Entertainment

Scopophobia is a DVD release by rock band Therapy? on Eagle Vision, a subsidiary of Eagle Rock Entertainment, on 27 October 2003. The bulk of the DVD is a full-length, 19-track concert recorded live at the Mandela Hall, Belfast on 6 June 2003.

Bonus features include 11 promo video clips, a quick Q&A session with the four band members, and a 30-minute hidden feature following the band on their European tour in May/June 2003 in support of their High Anxiety album.

In 2004, Eagle Vision released a two-disc limited-edition version of the DVD featuring an audio CD of the concert.

== Mandela Hall, Belfast 6/6/03 ==
1. "Hey Satan, You Rock" (studio version: High Anxiety)
2. "Who Knows" (studio version: High Anxiety)
3. "Nowhere" (studio version: Troublegum)
4. "Nobody Here But Us" (studio version: High Anxiety)
5. "Church Of Noise" (studio version: Semi-Detached)
6. "I Am The Money" (studio version: Shameless)
7. "Stories" (studio version: Infernal Love)
8. "Not In Any Name" (studio version: High Anxiety)
9. "If It Kills Me" (studio version: High Anxiety)
10. "Die Laughing" (studio version: Troublegum)
11. "My Voodoo Doll" (studio version: High Anxiety)
12. "Ten Year Plan" (studio version: Suicide Pact – You First)
13. "Trigger Inside" (studio version: Troublegum)
14. "Potato Junkie" (studio version: Pleasure Death)
15. "Diane" (studio version: Infernal Love)
16. "Rust" (studio version: High Anxiety)
17. "Teethgrinder" (studio version: Nurse)
18. "Knives" (studio version: Troublegum)
19. "Screamager" (studio version: Troublegum)

== Promo videos ==
1. Teethgrinder (1992)
2. Nausea (1992)
3. Screamager (1993)
4. Nowhere (1993)
5. Die Laughing (1994)
6. Trigger Inside (1994)
7. Isolation (1994) Version 2
8. Diane (1995)
9. Loose (1995)
10. Lonely, Cryin', Only (1998)
11. If It Kills Me (2003)

== Personnel ==
- Andy Cairns: vocals/guitar
- Michael McKeegan: bass/backing vocals
- Martin McCarrick: guitar/cello/backing vocals
- Neil Cooper: drums
- Fyfe Ewing: drums/vocals (promo videos 1–9)
- Graham Hopkins: drums/backing vocals (promo video 10)
- Pete Bartlett: mixer (concert)
- Perry Joseph: producer, director (concert)
- Iona Bateman: photographer
- Curt Evans: design
- Terry Shand: executive producer (DVD)
- Geoff Kempin: executive producer (DVD)
- John Gaydon: supervising producer (DVD)

== Trivia ==
- The concert footage is un-cut apart from the inclusion of two quick segments; the first is during "Ten Year Plan" (Andy standing in a forest), and the other is during "Rust" (Martin standing in Belfast). Individual footage of all the band members (Michael waking up outside his house, Martin waking up in a toilet, Andy waking up beside a busy road and Neil waking up in his car) appear at the end of the gig. These segments were recorded in June 2003.
- The limited edition cd has all the music unedited (including both "Ten Year Plan" and "Rust"), but some of the between song banter has been removed.
- Following the live performance of "Teethgrinder", Michael can be seen shaking Neil's hand – this is because Neil only learned the song that afternoon in rehearsal and had only one run-through of the song before the recording.
- The hidden feature (backstage on their European tour) can be accessed by waiting a couple of minutes on the title screen. A car will be heard to crash, a wheel will then roll across and come to rest on the screen, allowing a pop-up option of "Backstage".
- Liner notes on the package were written by Henry Rollins, Tim Wheeler of Ash, Dregen from Backyard Babies, Rich Jones from Amen, Neil Fallon from Clutch, JS Clayden from Pitchshifter, and Ian Glasper from Stampin' Ground.
- Despite the inclusion of 11 promo videos, the following videos were not included on the DVD: Meat Abstract, Innocent X, Turn, Opal Mantra, Isolation (version 1), Stories (version 1), Stories (version 2), Loose (Photek Remix), Church Of Noise, Little Tongues First, Bad Karma Follows You Around, and Gimme Back My Brain.
- The audio options are; Dolby Surround 5.1, Dolby Digital Stereo and DTS Digital Surround Sound.
- "Scopophobia" is fear of being seen or stared at by others.
