= Music Through a Cheap Transistor =

Compilation album by Therapy?
- Released: 26 February 2007 (download); 13 August 2007 (CD)
- Recorded: 1991–1998
- Studio: Maida Vale Studios, London, England
- Genre: Alternative rock, alternative metal
- Length: 51:35 (CD1); 42:10 (CD2)
- Label: Universal

Therapy? chronology
| One Cure Fits All (2006) | Music Through a Cheap Transistor (2007) | Crooked Timber (2009) |

Professional ratings
Review scores
| Source | Rating |
|---|---|
| Metal Hammer | 8/10 stars |

Music Through a Cheap Transistor is a compilation album by the Northern Irish rock band Therapy?. It was one of the first releases in Universal Records 2007 series of BBC sessions. Originally released as a download only on 26 February 2007, the set was later released on double CD on 13 August 2007.

The album features five different performances by Therapy?, which were recorded between 1991 and 1998 for BBC radio. It includes unique and exclusive versions of some of their greatest hits, alongside live favourites and three previously unreleased tracks: "Pile of Bricks", "The Sweeney" and "Lost Highway" (originally by Hank Williams).

(Aside from the first John Peel Session, the band were on A&M Records when all the featured sessions were recorded, but A&M have since been taken over by Universal Music Group; hence this release.)

"It's very flattering to be in the first batch of artists to have these old sessions made available in their entirety especially in a digital download format. Having existed as scraps on C-90's or as half-forgotten memories, it's brilliant to be able to re-visit so many unique (and one-off) performances and let people see what all the fuss was about..." Michael McKeegan – Therapy?

== Missing sessions ==
- Most noticeably lacking is a live studio session recorded for the Evening Session on 13 June 1995. The tracks performed were "Loose", "Bad Mother", "Our Love Must Die" and "30 Seconds". The reasons why this session is not included are unknown.
- Also not included on this compilation is a studio session recorded for the Rock Show on 1 October 2004. This is due to the compilation being released by Universal Records, as this session was composed entirely of tracks from 2004's Never Apologise Never Explain, which was released by Spitfire Records. The tracks performed were "Rise Up (Make Yourself Well)", "Die Like a Motherfucker", "So Called Life" and "Panic".

== Track listing ==
=== Disc 1 ===
- John Peel 15/8/91

| No. | Title | Length |
|---|---|---|
| 1. | "Innocent X/Meat Abstract" (Original versions: Babyteeth) | 8:52 |
| 2. | "Prisonbreaker" (Original version: Pleasure Death) | 4:34 |
| 3. | "Perversonality" (Original version: Nurse) | 3:56 |

- Evening Session 21/11/92

| No. | Title | Length |
|---|---|---|
| 4. | "Nausea" (Original version: Nurse) | 3:22 |
| 5. | "Totally Random Man" (Original version: Shortsharpshock EP) | 2:28 |
| 6. | "Accelerator" (Original version: Nurse) | 2:15 |
| 7. | "Teethgrinder" (Original version: Nurse) | 3:53 |

- John Peel 29/11/92

| No. | Title | Length |
|---|---|---|
| 8. | "Auto Surgery" (Original version: Shortsharpshock EP) | 2:30 |
| 9. | "Totally Random Man" (Original version: Shortsharpshock EP) | 2:30 |
| 10. | "Bloody Blue" (Original version: Thirty Seconds of Silence demo) | 1:13 |
| 11. | "Pile of Bricks" | 3:01 |

- Friday Rock Show 5/2/93

| No. | Title | Length |
|---|---|---|
| 12. | "Screamager" (Original version: Shortsharpshock EP) | 2:47 |
| 13. | "Totally Random Man" (Original version: Shortsharpshock EP) | 2:25 |
| 14. | "Disgracelands" (Original version: Nurse) | 3:49 |
| 15. | "Perversonality" (Original version: Nurse) | 3:54 |
| Total length: | | 51:35 |

=== Disc 2 ===
- Rock Show 7/1/94

| No. | Title | Length |
|---|---|---|
| 1. | "Brainsaw" (Original version: Troublegum) | 3:17 |
| 2. | "Trigger Inside" (Original version: Troublegum) | 3:58 |
| 3. | "Knives" (Original version: Troublegum) | 1:53 |
| 4. | "Isolation" (Original version: Troublegum) | 3:25 |

- Evening Session 4/8/95

| No. | Title | Length |
|---|---|---|
| 5. | "Bad Mother" (Original version: Infernal Love) | 4:00 |
| 6. | "Misery" (Original version: Infernal Love) | 3:04 |
| 7. | "The Sweeney" | 2:51 |
| 8. | "Lost Highway" | 1:28 |

- Evening Session 18/2/98

| No. | Title | Length |
|---|---|---|
| 9. | "Church of Noise" (Original version: Semi-Detached) | 2:52 |
| 10. | "Black Eye Purple Sky" (Original version: Semi-Detached) | 3:17 |
| 11. | "Tightrope Walker" (Original version: Semi-Detached) | 3:26 |
| 12. | "Teethgrinder" (Original version: Nurse) | 3:25 |
| 13. | "High Noon" (Original version: Lonely, Cryin', Only single) | 5:07 |
| Total length: | | 42:10 |

== Personnel ==
Therapy?

- Andy Cairns – vocals, guitar
- Michael McKeegan – bass
- Fyfe Ewing – vocals, drums (tracks 1–23)
- Martin McCarrick – cello, guitar, vocals (tracks 20–28)
- Graham Hopkins – drums (tracks 24–28)

Technical

- Ted De Bono – producer (tracks 1–3)
- James Birtwhistle – producer (tracks 4–11)
- Martin Colley – producer (tracks 12–15)
- Tony Wilson – producer (tracks 16–19)
- Miti Adhikari – producer (tracks 20–23)
- Paul Allen – producer (tracks 24–28)
