= We're Here to the End =

Live album by Therapy?
- Released: 5 November 2010 (EU); 8 November 2010 (UK)
- Recorded: 29–31 March 2010
- Venue: Monto Water Rats, London, England
- Genre: Rock
- Length: 67:45 (CD1); 68:25 (CD2)
- Label: Blast Records
- Producer: Adam Sinclair, Andy Cairns

Therapy? chronology
| Crooked Timber (2009) | We're Here to the End (2010) | A Brief Crack of Light (2012) |

Professional ratings
Review scores
| Source | Rating |
|---|---|
| AllMusic | 2.5/5 stars |
| Classic Rock | 6/10 stars |

We're Here to the End is the first full-length live album by the rock band Therapy? and the second album to be released on Blast Records, part of The Global Music Group family. It was released on 8 November 2010.

The album was recorded on 29, 30, 31 March 2010 at Monto Water Rats in London and mixed in May 2010 at Blast Studios in Newcastle.

Produced by Adam Sinclair and Andy Cairns, the album is a two-CD release featuring 36 tracks culled from all three nights of the London residency.

A total of 40 different songs were played across the three nights. The recordings of two songs, "Lonely, Cryin' Only" and "I Am the Money", were quickly discarded by the band due to performance quality. Two other songs, "Ten Year Plan" and "I Told You I Was Ill", were dropped due to technical issues with the recordings.

== Track listing ==
=== CD1 ===
| No. | Title | Length |
|---|---|---|
| 1. | "Screamager" | 2:52 |
| 2. | "Sister" | 5:22 |
| 3. | "Turn" | 3:41 |
| 4. | "Enjoy the Struggle" | 4:09 |
| 5. | "Die Like a Motherfucker" | 3:20 |
| 6. | "Stories" | 3:50 |
| 7. | "Meat Abstract" | 4:13 |
| 8. | "Exiles" | 5:27 |
| 9. | "Skyward" | 2:53 |
| 10. | "A Moment of Clarity" | 5:09 |
| 11. | "Sprung" | 3:44 |
| 12. | "Neck Freak" | 5:06 |
| 13. | "Diane" | 4:20 |
| 14. | "Potato Junkie" | 4:00 |
| 15. | "Dancin' with Manson" | 5:10 |
| 16. | "If It Kills Me" | 3:45 |
| 17. | "Rust" | 3:34 |
| Total length: | | 67:45 |

=== CD2 ===
| No. | Title | Length |
|---|---|---|
| 1. | "Nausea" | 3:46 |
| 2. | "Knives" | 2:09 |
| 3. | "Nowhere" | 2:41 |
| 4. | "Evil Elvis" | 2:29 |
| 5. | "Epilepsy" | 3:50 |
| 6. | "Rain Hits Concrete" | 2:50 |
| 7. | "Our White Noise" | 3:52 |
| 8. | "Opal Mantra" | 2:40 |
| 9. | "Fantasy Bag" | 4:11 |
| 10. | "Church of Noise" | 2:26 |
| 11. | "The Head That Tried to Strangle Itself" | 3:14 |
| 12. | "Polar Bear" | 3:59 |
| 13. | "Crooked Timber" | 7:03 |
| 14. | "Punishment Kiss" | 5:00 |
| 15. | "Trigger Inside" | 4:18 |
| 16. | "Innocent X" | 4:00 |
| 17. | "Die Laughing" | 3:02 |
| 18. | "Isolation" | 5:45 |
| 19. | "Teethgrinder" | 4:23 |
| Total length: | | 68:25 |

== Personnel ==
Therapy?

- Andy Cairns – vocals, guitar, mixing
- Neil Cooper – drums
- Michael McKeegan – bass, vocals

Technical

- Adam Sinclair – mixing
- John Walsh – live sound
- Richard Baker – live mix consultant
- Marc Suski – artwork
- Jon Lawless – live photography
