= Disquiet (album) =

Studio album by Therapy?
- Released: 23 March 2015
- Recorded: April 2014
- Studios: Blast Studio, Newcastle, England
- Genres: Alternative rock, alternative metal
- Length: 41:47
- Label: Amazing Record Co.
- Producer: Tom Dalgety

Therapy? chronology
The Gemil Box (2013)	Disquiet (2015)	Communion: Live at the Union Chapel (2017)

Singles from Disquiet
- 1. "Still Hurts" Released: 9 March 2015; 2. "Deathstimate" Released: 30 October 2015; 3. "Tides" Released: 15 April 2016

Professional ratings
Aggregate scores
Source	Rating
AnyDecentMusic?	6.3/10
Metacritic	77/100
Review scores
Source	Rating
Drowned in Sound	6/10
The Irish Times	3/5 stars
Kerrang!	4/5 stars
laut.de	3/5 stars
Louder Sound	4/5 stars
Metal Hammer	4/5 stars
The Music	3.5/4 stars
PopMatters	3.5/5 stars
Record Collector	4/5 stars
Vive Le Rock	8/10 stars

Disquiet is the fourteenth studio album by the rock band Therapy?, and the first album to be released on new UK label Amazing Record Co. Produced by Tom Dalgety, it was released on 23 March 2015.

== Background ==
Demo sessions for the album began at Blast Studios, Newcastle, England on 18 February 2014. The band laid down 18 tracks and completed pre-production on 28 February 2014. The album proper was recorded from 17 to 30 April 2014 at Blast Studios. The albums' release was delayed by almost a year due to their record company Blast Records shutting down and the band then signing with fledgling Amazing Record Co.

Pre-orders of the album were announced on 23 February 2015 and included an instant download of two album tracks and an exclusive pre-order track called We Kill People. A digital only single called Still Hurts, featuring two more non-album tracks, was released on 9 March 2015. A promo video directed by Sitcom Soldiers was premiered on 3 March 2015.

Disquiet reached No. 79 in the UK Charts which was the bands' highest chart placing since 1999's Suicide Pact – You First. The album was originally released on CD and download but the LP version was delayed release until 1 June 2015.

Disquiet - Restless Edition was released on CD on 20 May 2022 by Demolition Records. It featured the original album with 7 bonus tracks.

== Early performances ==
The opening track Still Hurts was debuted live at a gig in Cork on 25 October 2013 and played numerous times over the following months. Insecurity was first played live at the Coastrock Festival in Belgium on 12 April 2014. An acoustic version of Tides was debuted live by Andy Cairns at his gig in Helsinki on 13 February 2014, while an acoustic interpretation of Idiot Cousin was first aired at his Dublin show on 26 March 2014.

== Track listing ==
All songs written by Andrew James Cairns, except "Vulgar Display of Powder" and "Words Fail Me" written by Andrew James Cairns / Michael McKeegan / Neil Cooper.

No.	Title	Length
1.	"Still Hurts"	2:57
2.	"Tides"	3:35
3.	"Good News Is No News"	3:42
4.	"Fall Behind"	2:55
5.	"Idiot Cousin"	3:03
6.	"Helpless Still Lost"	4:40
7.	"Insecurity"	4:10
8.	"Vulgar Display of Powder"	3:45
9.	"Words Fail Me"	2:38
10.	"Torment Sorrow Misery Strife"	3:16
11.	"Deathstimate"	7:00
Total length:		41:47

Restless Edition
No.	Title	Originally from	Length
12.	"Armed With Anger"	"Still Hurts" single
13.	"Demons Demons"	"Still Hurts" single
14.	"Electricity"	"Deathstimate" single
15.	"If You're Driving Pull Over"	"Deathstimate" single
16.	"Slippies"	"Tides" single
17.	"Smile Or Die"	"Tides" single
18.	"We Kill People"	Original album pre-order bonus track

== Singles ==
- "Still Hurts" released 9 March 2015 as a digital only single with "Demons! Demons!" and "Armed with Anger".
- "Deathstimate" released 30 October 2015 as a digital only single with "If You're Driving Pull Over" and "Electricity", a cover of the OMD track.
- "Tides" released 15 April 2016 as a CD single with "Slippies", "Smile or Die" and "Insecurity (PitchPhase Mix)".

== Promo videos ==
- "Still Hurts": directed by 'Sitcom Soldiers'
- "Deathstimate": directed by 'Sitcom Soldiers'
- "Tides": directed by 'Quantum VR Media'

== Personnel ==
Therapy?

- Andy Cairns – vocals, guitar, producer
- Neil Cooper – drums, producer
- Michael McKeegan – bass, vocals, producer

Technical

- Tom Dalgety – producer, engineer, mixer
- Nigel Rolfe – artwork concept/photography

== Charts ==
Chart (2015)	Peak position
Belgian Albums (Ultratop Flanders)	120
Belgian Albums (Ultratop Wallonia)	164
Dutch Albums (Album Top 100)	99
Scottish Albums (Official Charts)	69
UK Albums (OCC)	79
