= Never Apologise Never Explain =

Studio album by Therapy?
- Released: 27 September 2004
- Recorded: June 2004
- Studios: Parkgate Studios, Hastings, England
- Genres: Alternative rock, alternative metal
- Length: 39:48
- Label: Spitfire
- Producer: Pete Bartlett

Therapy? chronology
High Anxiety (2003)	Never Apologise Never Explain (2004)	One Cure Fits All (2006)

Singles from Never Apologise Never Explain
- 1. "Polar Bear" / "Rock You Monkeys" Released: 13 June 2005

Professional ratings
Review scores
Source	Rating
AllMusic	4/5 stars
Drowned in Sound	9/10 stars
RTÉ	3/5 stars

Never Apologise Never Explain is the eighth full-length album by the rock band Therapy?, and the second to be released on Spitfire Records. It was released on 27 September 2004 and was recorded in June 2004 at Parkgate Studios, Hastings. It was the first album to be recorded as a trio since Infernal Love in 1995.

== Background ==
Never Apologise Never Explain marked a return to the claustrophobic sound of the band's early releases. It failed to chart in the Top 200 of the UK Albums Chart. The album was not released in North America.

The album was released on CD only. A limited edition CD-ROM of the album contains two live videos ("Teethgrinder" & "Who Knows") from the Scopophobia DVD.

Polish label Metal Mind Productions re-released the album on 2 November 2009. The album was remastered using 24-Bit technology, limited to 1000 numbered copies, on a gold disk digipak CD.

== Track listing ==
All songs written by Therapy?

No.	Title	Length
1.	"Rise Up (Make Yourself Well)"	2:49
2.	"Die Like a Motherfucker"	2:42
3.	"Perish the Thought"	3:41
4.	"Here Be Monsters"	2:45
5.	"So-Called Life"	3:10
6.	"Panic"	2:03
7.	"Polar Bear"	3:40
8.	"Rock You Monkeys"	3:06
9.	"Dead"	2:37
10.	"Long Distance"	3:32
11.	"This Ship Is Sinking"	3:18
12.	"Save the Sermon"	3:03
13.	"Last One to Heaven's a Loser"	3:22
Total length:		39:48

== Personnel ==
Therapy?

- Andy Cairns – vocals, guitar
- Neil Cooper – drums
- Michael McKeegan – bass

Technical

- Pete Bartlett – producer, mixer
- Simon Wakeling – engineer
- Giles Hall – mixer
- Chris Potter and John Davis – mastering
- Iona Bateman – photography
- Simon Leigh – photography
- Curt Evans – design

== Singles ==
- "Polar Bear"/"Rock You Monkeys" was a double A-side download only single released on 13 June 2005 with a live version of "Die Laughing" from the Alive Festival in Belgium, 31 July 2004.
- "Rise Up (Make Yourself Well) was released as a radio only single in 2004.
- "Die Like a Motherfucker" was released as a radio only single in 2005.
- "Long Distance" was released as a radio only single in Belgium in 2005.
- "Perish the Thought" was released as a radio only single in Belgium in 2005.

== Promo videos ==
- "Rise Up (Make Yourself Well)"
- "Rock You Monkeys": directed by Andre Thyret

== Origins of the phrase ==
The originator of this commonly used phrase, often attributed to members of the House of Windsor (British Royalty), Duke of Wellington, Benjamin Disraeli and others, is said to be John Arbuthnot Fisher, a notable British Admiral of the Victorian and Edwardian era. ("Boldness has genius, power and magic in it ... Never contradict. Never explain. Never apologise"). And even earlier, King Charles I of England is quoted in The Oxford Dictionary of Quotations as writing "Never make a defence or apology before you be accused", in a letter to Lord Wentworth as long ago as 1636.
