= Crooked Timber (album) =

Studio album by Therapy?
- Released: 23 March 2009
- Recorded: July–August 2008
- Studios: Blast Studios, Newcastle, England and August–September 2008 at The Beauchamp Building, London, England
- Genres: Alternative rock, alternative metal
- Length: 49:22; 67:58 (DGE)
- Label: Demolition Records
- Producer: Andy Gill

Therapy? chronology
Music Through a Cheap Transistor (2007)	Crooked Timber (2009)	We're Here to the End (2010)

Singles from Crooked Timber
- 1. "Crooked Timber" Released: 18 May 2009; 2. "Exiles" Released: 7 July 2010

Professional ratings
Review scores
Source	Rating
AllMusic	3.5/5 stars
Drowned in Sound	7/10 stars

Crooked Timber is the twelfth studio album by the rock band Therapy?, and the first to be released on Demolition Records. It was released on 23 March 2009. The album was recorded from July to August 2008 at Blast Studios, Newcastle, with additional recording at The Beauchamp Building in London from August to September 2008. Produced by Andy Gill, the album features a bias towards rhythm rather than melody.

According to Andy Cairns; "I guess we're always challenging just what makes us Therapy?. After so many years, if we were formulaic about it, we'd have gotten bored with the band long ago. The album was written together as a band, and each track has its own concept and inspirations. They took a while to write and we've taken our time to write them."

"From the crooked timber of humanity, no straight thing was ever made." – Immanuel Kant (18th-century German philosopher)

Andy explains: "The recording is about celebrating people's quirks, the things which make us unique. These days everyone tries to fit in, instead of just being themselves. The songs examine what it means to be human – To realise that we are the only living things on the planet aware of our own deaths." There are various allusions to philosophical works in the music, such as lyrics in "Clowns Galore" referencing Waiting for Godot. The song "Bad Excuse For Daylight" borrows a rhythmic figure from Stravinsky's The Rite of Spring.

Crooked Timber reached number 197 in the UK Album charts. As of early May 2009 (6 weeks following its release), the album had sold 30,000 copies in Europe and was certified silver.

The album was released on limited edition white 12" vinyl, CD and Download.

On 19 July 2010 the album was re-released as a "Deluxe Gold Edition" digipak CD featuring two bonus tracks, two remixes and 4 alternate versions.

On 10 June 2022 the album was once again re-released, this time as a 2CD "Extended Version" featuring the original album on disc 1 and a selection of previously released bonus tracks on disc 2.

== Singles ==
- "Crooked Timber" – 18 May 2009 on CD and download. A single edit version of "Crooked Timber" with "Don't Try", "Low Winter Sun" and "Crooked Timber (Breathless FX Mix)".
- "Exiles" – 7 July 2010 as a download only. "Exiles" (Gold Edition Sample Version), with "Exiles (Subglitch & Stitch Remix)" and "Magic Mountain (The Dubious Twins Babylon Remix)"
- "Enjoy the Struggle" was scheduled to be released as the album's first single, but in a change of heart, "Crooked Timber" was deemed to be a better choice by the band.

== Promo video ==
- "Crooked Timber": directed by 'Sitcom Soldiers'

== Reception ==
Reviews have been mostly positive. The album earned a rave review on Irish indie website drop-d, stating it "not only confirms their incredible legacy, but takes them to a new level", and they earned the first ever 10/10 on The Mag". Kerrang! gave the album a KKK review (the equivalent of 3/5). Kerrang!'s UK competitor, Metal Hammer gave the album 8/10. However, French websites have, on average, slated the album criticising its schizophrenic nature and the bands' refusal to focus on one particular sound.

== Track listing ==
All tracks are written by Therapy? except track 4 (Therapy? and Andy Gill).

No.	Title	Length
1.	"The Head That Tried to Strangle Itself"	3:24
2.	"Enjoy the Struggle"	4:10
3.	"Clowns Galore"	3:41
4.	"Exiles"	5:36
5.	"Crooked Timber"	5:52
6.	"I Told You I Was Ill"	3:50
7.	"Somnambulist"	4:04
8.	"Blacken the Page"	2:48
9.	"Magic Mountain"	10:05
10.	"Bad Excuse for Daylight"	5:49
Total length:		49:22

Deluxe Gold edition
No.	Title	Length
1.	"The Head That Tried to Strangle Itself"	3:27
2.	"Enjoy the Struggle"	4:12
3.	"Clowns Galore"	3:43
4.	"Exiles" (Sample Version)	5:47
5.	"Crooked Timber" (Breathless FX Mix)	5:55
6.	"I Told You I Was Ill"	3:53
7.	"Somnambulist"	4:08
8.	"Blacken the Page"	2:49
9.	"Magic Mountain" (Sample Version)	10:14
10.	"Bad Excuse for Daylight" (Sample Version)	5:57
11.	"Exiles" (Bong-Ra Gutteral Exodus Mix)	4:42
12.	"Magic Mountain" (Snug Slut Mix)	4:32
13.	"Low Winter Sun"	4:21
14.	"Don't Try"	4:16
Total length:		67:58

Extended Version (Disc 2)
No.	Title	Length
1.	"Exiles" (Sample Mix)	5:47
2.	"Crooked Timber" (Breathless FX Mix)	5:55
3.	"Magic Mountain" (Sample Version)	10:14
4.	"Bad Excuse For Daylight" (Sample Version)	5:57
5.	"Exiles" (Bong-Ra Guttural Exodus Mix)	4:42
6.	"Magic Mountain" (Snug Slut Mix)	4:32
7.	"Low Winter Sun"	4:21
8.	"Don't Try"	4:16
Total length:		45:31

== Personnel ==
Therapy?

- Andy Cairns – vocals, guitar, mixing
- Neil Cooper – drums
- Michael McKeegan – bass

Technical

- Andy Gill – producer and engineer
- Sam Morton – engineer
- Adam Sinclair – mixing and additional recording
- Tom Hoad – photography
- Michael Surtees – design

== Charts ==
Chart (2009)	Peak position
Belgian Albums (Ultratop Flanders)	98
UK Albums (OCC)	197
