= Hard Cold Fire =

Studio album by Therapy?
- Released: 5 May 2023
- Studio: Marshall (London, England)
- Genre: Alternative metal; alternative rock
- Length: 31:14
- Label: Marshall
- Producer: Chris Sheldon

Therapy? chronology
Greatest Hits (The Abbey Road Session) (2020)	Hard Cold Fire (2023)

Singles from Hard Cold Fire
- 1. "Joy" Released: 10 March 2023

Professional ratings
Aggregate scores
Source	Rating
Metacritic	76/100
Review scores
Source	Rating
Buzz	4/5 stars
Clash	4/5 stars
Classic Rock	4/5 stars
Hot Press	8/10
Kerrang!	3/5
laut.de	3/5 stars
Louder Than War	4/5
Metal Hammer	4/5 stars
Sputnikmusic	3.7/5

Hard Cold Fire is the sixteenth studio album by Northern Irish rock band Therapy?, released on 5 May 2023 through Marshall Records. This is the band's first record since 2018's CLEAVE. The album was originally recorded in 2021, but was postponed to 2023 because of the delayed "So Much For The 32 Year Plan" tour in 2022. Only ten cuts were kept for the record despite there being somewhere around 20 tracks recorded/for demos. Through interviews, vocalist/guitarist Andy Cairns stated that the band wanted to come back from the COVID-19 lock-down with force and catharsis, and the outtakes were deemed too "depressing" to be a worthy comeback.

== Background ==
Produced by Chris Sheldon, who produced the band's previous studio album Cleave, Hard Cold Fire was released on 5 May 2023. The album was recorded in November 2021 at Marshall Studios in London.

Pre-orders of the album became available on 10 March 2023 and included six different coloured LPs, a white label test pressing LP (limited to 16), a CD and a cassette. A promo video for "Joy" was also released digitally the same day. "Poundland of Hope and Glory" was released as a single on 5 April 2023 along with an accompanying video. A promo video for "Woe" was released on 01 November 2023.

== Track listing ==
Hard Cold Fire track listing
No.	Title	Length
1.	"They Shoot the Terrible Master"	2:47
2.	"Woe"	2:57
3.	"Joy"	2:55
4.	"Bewildered Herd"	3:21
5.	"Two Wounded Animals"	3:28
6.	"To Disappear"	3:10
7.	"Mongrel"	3:37
8.	"Poundland of Hope and Glory"	2:25
9.	"Ugly"	3:02
10.	"Days Kollaps"	3:32
Total length:		31:14

== Personnel ==
Therapy?

- Andy Cairns – vocals, guitar
- Neil Cooper – drums
- Michael McKeegan – bass

Technical

- Chris Sheldon – producer, engineer, mixer
- Nigel Rolfe – artwork concept/photography

== Charts ==
Chart performance for Hard Cold Fire
Chart (2023)	Peak position
Belgian Albums (Ultratop Flanders)	14
Belgian Albums (Ultratop Wallonia)	198
Irish Albums (OCC)	48
Scottish Albums (OCC)	4
UK Albums (OCC)	29
UK Independent Albums (OCC)	3
UK Rock & Metal Albums (OCC)	1
