= One Cure Fits All =

Studio album by Therapy?
- Released: 24 April 2006
- Recorded: January 2006
- Studio: Jacobs Studios, Surrey, England
- Genre: Alternative rock, alternative metal
- Length: 44:33
- Label: Spitfire
- Producer: Pedro Ferreira

Therapy? chronology
Never Apologise Never Explain (2004)	One Cure Fits All (2006)	Music Through a Cheap Transistor (2007)

Singles from One Cure Fits All
- 1. "Rain Hits Concrete" Released: 10 April 2006

Professional ratings
Review scores
Source	Rating
Drowned in Sound	7/10 stars

One Cure Fits All is the ninth full-length album by rock band Therapy?, and the third and final to be released on Spitfire Records. It was released on 24 April 2006. The album was recorded in January 2006 at Jacobs Studios in Surrey. The album was not released in North America, but charted at number 152 in the UK Albums Chart.

Produced by Pedro Ferreira (who also produced The Darkness album Permission to Land), the album features markedly polished production, similar to their major label years. This met with a mixed reaction upon its release by fans of the band. The material itself varies, with songs like "Walk through Darkness" and "Dopamine, Seratonin, Adrenaline" displaying anthemic tendencies, while the like of "Unconsoled" and "Private Nobody" are in keeping with the familiar themes of isolation and alienation.

The album was released on CD and download.

On 27 March 2026, the album was reissued by Mercury Studios on 2CD, black vinyl and limited edition red vinyl formats for its 20th anniversary. The CD version contains an extra disc of b-sides and previously unreleased demos.

== Track listing ==
All songs written by Therapy?

No.	Title	Length
1.	"Outro"	0:34
2.	"Sprung"	3:50
3.	"Deluded Son"	2:58
4.	"Into the Light"	2:56
5.	"Lose It All"	3:36
6.	"Dopamine, Seratonin, Adrenaline"	4:17
7.	"Unconsoled"	3:53
8.	"Our White Noise"	3:40
9.	"Private Nobody"	3:49
10.	"Rain Hits Concrete"	3:07
11.	"Fear of God"	3:13
12.	"Heart Beat Hits"	3:42
13.	"Walk through Darkness"	4:50
Total length:		44:33

2026 Reissue Disc 2
No.	Title	Length
1.	"Play On" ("Rain Hits Concrete" single)
2.	"Crazy Cocaine Eyes" ("Rain Hits Concrete" single)
3.	"Hard Work Hope" ("Rain Hits Concrete" single)
4.	"Freeze the Remains" (iTunes only track)
5.	"Sprung" (2005 demo)
6.	"Deluded Son" (2005 demo)
7.	"Into the Light" (2005 demo)
8.	"Lose It All" (2005 demo)
9.	"Dopamine, Seratonin, Adrenaline" (2005 demo)
10.	"Unconsoled" (2005 demo)
11.	"Our White Noise" (2005 demo)
12.	"Private Nobody" (2005 demo)
13.	"Rain Hits Concrete" (2005 demo)
14.	"Fear of God" (2005 demo)
15.	"Heart Beat Hits" (2005 demo)
16.	"Walk Through Darkness" (2005 demo)

== Personnel ==
Therapy?

- Andy Cairns – vocals, guitar
- Neil Cooper – drums
- Michael McKeegan – bass

with:

- Eduardo Rei – cowbell
- Ian Gatford – voice on "Dopamine, Seratonin, Adrenaline"

Technical

- Pedro Ferreira – producer, mixer and engineer
- Sam Scott Hunter – photography
- Curt Evans – design

== Singles ==
- "Rain Hits Concrete" was a download only EP released on 10 April 2006 with "Crazy Cocaine Eyes", "Hard Work Hope" and "Play On".
- "Freeze the Remains" was a download only track available from iTunes. It was also later released on a promo CD given away with Rock Sound magazine.

== Charts ==
Chart (2006)	Peak position
Belgian Albums (Ultratop Flanders)	56
UK Albums (OCC)	152
