= A Brief Crack of Light =

Studio album by Therapy?
- Released: 6 February 2012
- Recorded: December 2010 – February 2011 (tracks 1–4, 6–9), and June 2011 (tracks 5, 10)
- Studios: Blast Studio, Newcastle
- Genres: Alternative rock, alternative metal
- Length: 41:18
- Label: Blast Records
- Producers: Adam Sinclair, Therapy?

Therapy? chronology
We're Here to the End (2010)	A Brief Crack of Light (2012)	The Gemil Box (2013)

Singles from A Brief Crack of Light
- 1. "Living in the Shadow of the Terrible Thing" Released: 23 January 2012; 2. "Before You with You After You" Released: 26 November 2012

Professional ratings
Aggregate scores
Source	Rating
Metacritic	67/100
Review scores
Source	Rating
AllMusic	3/5 stars
Clash Music	8/10
God Is in the TV	4/5 stars
The Irish Times	2/5 stars
Louder Sound	3/5 stars
NME	2.5/5 stars
PopMatters	6/10
Sputnikmusic	4.5/5

A Brief Crack of Light is the thirteenth studio album by the band Therapy?, and the third album to be released on Blast Records, part of The Global Music Group family. It was originally scheduled to be released in October 2011, but was finally released on 6 February 2012 in the UK and on 14 February 2012 in the US.

== Background ==
The album was recorded in two separate sessions; from December 2010 to February 2011, and in June 2011 at Blast Studios, Newcastle, England. The first session was mixed in March 2011, while the second session was mixed in July 2011.

Produced by Adam Sinclair & Therapy?, the album's title comes from Speak, Memory (1951) a memoir by Russian writer Vladimir Nabokov, who describes life as "A brief crack of light between two eternities of darkness".

The album was preceded by a single entitled Living in the Shadow of the Terrible Thing on 23 January 2012, a video of which was filmed in November 2011 and premiered on the bands' official page on 9 January 2012. A video for Before You, With You, After You was premiered on the bands' official page on 19 November 2012. It consisted of footage filmed at Belfast's Empire Music Hall on 4 October 2012 by "Giftedlive.com".

Living in the Shadow of the Terrible Thing was debuted at a gig in Cork, Ireland in October 2010 and later played at various European festivals in Summer 2011. Before You, With You, After You was debuted at a festival in Torhout, Belgium in September 2011.

== Track listing ==
All songs written by Therapy? except "The Buzzing" & "Ecclesiastes", written by Andrew James Cairns.

No.	Title	Length
1.	"Living in the Shadow of the Terrible Thing"	3:55
2.	"Plague Bell"	4:11
3.	"Marlow"	4:36
4.	"Before You, With You, After You"	3:32
5.	"The Buzzing"	3:38
6.	"Get Your Dead Hand off My Shoulder"	4:07
7.	"Ghost Trio"	5:20
8.	"Why Turbulence?"	3:33
9.	"Stark Raving Sane"	2:36
10.	"Ecclesiastes"	5:42
Total length:		41:18

== Personnel ==
Therapy?

- Andy Cairns – vocals, guitar, producer
- Neil Cooper – drums, producer
- Michael McKeegan – bass, vocals, producer

Technical

- Adam Sinclair – producer, engineer, mixer
- Nigel Rolfe – artwork concept/photography
- Tom Hoad – band photography
- Michael Surtees – design/layout

== Single ==
- "Living in the Shadow of the Terrible Thing" - 23 January 2012, download only.

== Promo videos ==
- "Living in the Shadow of the Terrible Thing": Directed by 'Sitcom Soldiers'.
- "Before You, With You, After You": Directed by 'Giftedlive'

== Reception ==
"A Brief Crack of Light" has received almost universal high acclaim in Europe. Kerrang! magazine in the UK awarded the album 4/5 stars while listing it among the "50 Albums You Have To Hear In 2012". Also in the UK, Rock Sound magazine gave it a score of 8/10, as did Metal Hammer magazine. Clash magazine awarded 8/10 and Northern Ireland's AU Magazine judged the album favourably with a score of 8/10. In Denmark, Metal Revolution afforded the album a score of 90/100.

== Charts ==
Chart (2012)	Peak position
Irish Albums (IRMA)	93
