= JAAW =

- Genres: post-industrial
- Works: Supercluster
- Years active: 2023–present
- Label: Svart
- Members: Andy Cairns, Wayne Adams, Jason Stoll, Adam Betts
- Website: svartrecords.com/en/artist/jaaw/11115

JAAW is a post-industrial "supergroup" formed of members from Therapy?, Death Pedals, Mugstar, and Three Trapped Tigers. Debut album Supercluster, released in 2023, was generally critically well received.

== History ==
Jaaw was formed c. 2023 and is composed of Wayne Adams (Death Pedals) on vocals, Jason Stoll (Mugstar) on bass, Adam Betts (Three Trapped Tigers) on drums, and Andy Cairns from Therapy? on guitar. According to Cairns, the band is named after the first letters of the first names of all the band members, and "JAAW" is pronounced "Jaw". The band are characterized as a "noise-rock supergroup" by The Quietus.

In 2023 the group released album Supercluster on Svart Records. It includes a cover of "Army Of Me" by Bjork. Critic Jon Buckland, writing for The Quietus, concluded his review by stating it would appeal to those who like "a rollicking good time, formed from sheet metal guitars, a powerhouse drummer gone spasmodic, and barrelling bass lines strapped to the overclocked engine of a runaway rollercoaster". The record received a positive 8/10 rating in Distorted Sound, with the review highlighting the "noise-laden brilliance". The review in Metal Hammer magazine was more circumspect, cautioning the music would take some familiarisation.

In October 2023 the band performed a live session for BBC Radio 6.

== Discography ==
=== Singles ===
- "Rot" (2023)

=== Albums ===
- Supercluster (2023)
