= Cleave (album) =

Studio album by Therapy?
- Released: 21 September 2018
- Recorded: January–February 2018
- Studio: Blast Studio, Newcastle, England
- Genre: Alternative rock, alternative metal
- Length: 32:45
- Label: Marshall
- Producer: Chris Sheldon

Therapy? chronology
Communion: Live at the Union Chapel (2017)	Cleave (2018)	Greatest Hits (The Abbey Road Session) (2020)

Singles from Cleave
- 1. "Callow" Released: 25 May 2018; 2. "Wreck It Like Beckett" Released: 7 September 2018; 3. "Kakistocracy" Released: 15 February 2019

Professional ratings
Review scores
Source	Rating
AllMusic	3.5/5 stars
The Irish Times	4/5 stars
Kerrang!	4/5 stars
Hot Press	9/10
Louder Than War	8/10
Louder Sound	4/5 stars
laut.de	4/5 stars
Metal Hammer	4/5 stars
New Noise Magazine	3.5/5 stars
RTÉ	4/5 stars

Cleave is the fifteenth studio album by the rock band Therapy?, and the first album to be released on new UK label Marshall Records, part of the Marshall Amplification company.

== Background ==
Produced by Chris Sheldon, who previously produced Troublegum and Semi-Detached, it was released on 21 September 2018. Demo sessions for the album began at Blast Studios in Newcastle in late 2017. The album proper was recorded from 15 January to 8 February 2018 at Blast Studios.

Pre-orders of the album became available on 25 June 2018 through Pledge Music and included a signed CD, LP, coloured LP (limited edition of 500), white label test pressing LP (limited to 10), handwritten lyric sheets and an exclusive T-shirt.

A digital-only single called "Callow" was released on 25 May 2018. A promo video directed by Sitcom Soldiers was premiered a month later on 25 June 2018.

A second digital single called "Wreck It Like Beckett" was released on 7 September 2018, accompanied by a lyric video.

"Kakistocracy" was released as a digital only single on 15 February 2019.

A lyric video for the song "Success? Success Is Survival" was released on 8 August 2019.

== Singles ==
- "Callow" released 25 May 2018 as a digital-only single.
- "Wreck It Like Beckett" released 7 September 2018 as a digital-only single.
- "Kakistocracy" released 15 February 2019 as a digital-only single.

=== Promo videos ===
- "Callow" (directed by 'Sitcom Soldiers')
- "Kakistocracy"

== Early performances ==
An acoustic version of "Crutch" was debuted live by Andy Cairns at a session filmed for Audio Production Workshop in the UK on 17 April 2017. New song "Flashback Jack" was first played live at the Parkpop Festival in Netherlands on 23 June 2017. "Expelled" (then called "Spat Out") was played live at a gig in Athens on 24 November 2017. "Callow" was debuted live at a gig in Milton Keynes on 5 March 2018 and has remained in the set since. "Wreck It Like Beckett" was played live at a gig in Aachen on 7 June 2018 and subsequent gigs.

== Track listing ==
All lyrics by Andrew James Cairns.

No.	Title	Music	Length
1.	"Wreck It Like Beckett"	Cairns, McKeegan, Cooper	3:19
2.	"Kakistocracy"	Cairns, McKeegan	2:58
3.	"Callow"	Cairns	3:03
4.	"Expelled"	Cairns, McKeegan, Cooper	3:01
5.	"Success? Success Is Survival"	Cairns, McKeegan, Cooper	3:53
6.	"Save Me from the Ordinary"	Cairns, McKeegan	2:57
7.	"Crutch"	Cairns	3:00
8.	"I Stand Alone"	Cairns, McKeegan, Cooper	4:08
9.	"Dumbdown"	Cairns, Cooper	3:01
10.	"No Sunshine"	Cairns, McKeegan, Cooper	3:25
Total length:			32:45

== Personnel ==
Therapy?

- Andy Cairns – vocals, guitar
- Neil Cooper – drums
- Michael McKeegan – bass

Technical

- Chris Sheldon – producer, engineer, mixer
- Anthony Mills – assistant producer, engineer, mixer
- Nigel Rolfe – artwork concept/photography
- Tom Hoad – photography
- Paul Burgess – design

== Charts ==
Chart (2018)	Peak position
Belgian Albums (Ultratop Flanders)	76
Belgian Albums (Ultratop Wallonia)	185
Irish Albums (IRMA)	31
Scottish Albums (OCC)	18
UK Albums (OCC)	43
