= Finding Shore =

Studio album by Tom Rogerson with Brian Eno
- Released: 8 December 2017
- Studio: Opal (London)
- Length: 48:52
- Label: Dead Oceans

Tom Rogerson chronology
Cable Street Shorts (2010)	Finding Shore (2017)	Retreat to Bliss (2022)

Brian Eno chronology
Reflection (2017)	Finding Shore (2017)	Mixing Colours (2020)

Finding Shore is a collaborative studio album by English musicians Tom Rogerson and Brian Eno. It was released on 8 December 2017 through Dead Oceans. It received generally favorable reviews from critics.

== Background ==
Tom Rogerson is an English pianist and the founder of Three Trapped Tigers. He met Brian Eno by chance outside the toilet at a show. They bonded over their roots in Suffolk. For Finding Shore, they used Piano Bar, a Moog gear designed to transform the piano's notes into MIDI signals that Eno would then manipulate. The album was released on 8 December 2017 through Dead Oceans.

== Critical reception ==
Professional ratings
Aggregate scores
Source	Rating
Metacritic	74/100
Review scores
Source	Rating
AllMusic	3.5/5 stars
The A.V. Club	B+
Drowned in Sound	6/10
Exclaim!	8/10
The Independent	3/5 stars
The Irish Times	3/5 stars
The Line of Best Fit	9/10
The Observer	4/5 stars
Pitchfork	8.0/10
Record Collector	3/5 stars

According to the review aggregator Metacritic, Finding Shore received "generally favorable reviews" based on a weighted average score of 74 out of 100 from 12 critic scores.

Robert Ham of Pitchfork described the album as "a record that beautifully smears together modern classical, ambient, and jazz." He added, "Between their respective spotlight turns, both musicians are on equal footing, challenging and surprising one another, and their listeners, with music that feels alive and wondrous." Dave Beech of The Line of Best Fit commented that "while Finding Shore certainly isn't the most accessible of albums, it's one that's likely to stay with its listeners long after the dull rumble of its closing moments have faded in to nothing." Kevin Harley of Record Collector stated, "With Eno encouraging his co-traveller to open up and experiment, the result is an album of finely balanced extremes: transporting and becalmed, exploratory and soothing."

== Track listing ==
Finding Shore track listing
No.	Title	Length
1.	"Idea of Order at Kyson Point"	3:30
2.	"Motion in Field"	3:46
3.	"On-ness"	3:52
4.	"March Away"	2:50
5.	"Eastern Stack"	2:45
6.	"Minor Rift"	2:10
7.	"The Gabbard"	3:01
8.	"Red Slip"	1:51
9.	"Quoit Blue"	4:41
10.	"Marsh Chorus"	6:41
11.	"An Iken Loop"	3:04
12.	"Chain Home"	5:21
13.	"Rest"	5:21
Total length:		48:52

== Personnel ==
Credits adapted from liner notes.

- Tom Rogerson – notes
- Brian Eno – sounds, recording
- Mattia Sartori – additional engineering
- Matt Colton – mastering
- Miles Johnson – artwork
- Matthew Parri Thomas – photography

== Charts ==
Chart performance for Finding Shore
Chart (2017)	Peak position
US New Age Albums (Billboard)	5
