= Therapy? =

Northern Irish rock band

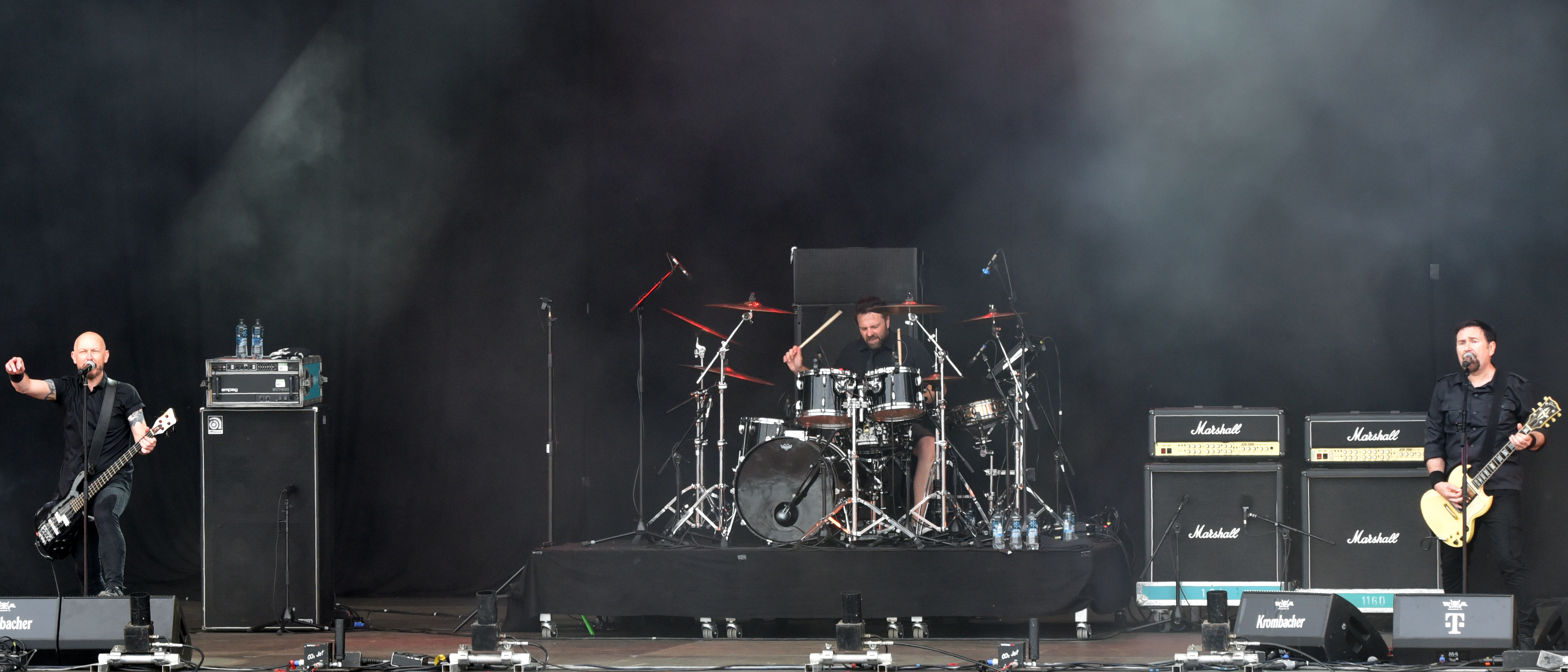
- L-R: Michael McKeegan, Neil Cooper and Andy Cairns at Wacken Open Air 2022

Background information
- Origin: Larne, Northern Ireland
- Genres: Alternative metal; noise rock; alternative rock
- Works: Discography; songs
- Years active: 1989–present
- Labels: Wiiija; A&M; Ark 21; Spitfire; Blast; Amazing; Marshall
- Members: Andy Cairns; Michael McKeegan; Neil Cooper
- Past members: Fyfe Ewing; Martin McCarrick; Graham Hopkins
- Website: therapyquestionmark.co.uk

Therapy? are a Northern Irish rock band from Larne, formed in 1989 by guitarist-vocalist Andy Cairns and drummer-vocalist Fyfe Ewing. Therapy? recorded their first demo with Cairns filling in on bass guitar. To complete the lineup, the band recruited Larne bassist Michael McKeegan. The band signed with major label A&M Records in 1992, for which they released four albums, most notably Troublegum in 1994 and Infernal Love in 1995. Ewing's departure in early 1996 preceded the arrivals of his replacement Graham Hopkins, as well as Martin McCarrick on guitar and cello. Neil Cooper replaced Hopkins in 2002. McCarrick departed in 2004, and the band have remained a three-piece ever since.

Therapy? are currently signed to UK independent label Marshall Records. The band have released 14 studio albums and sold over two million albums worldwide.

== History ==
=== Early years (1989–1992) ===
While attending a charity gig at the Jordanstown Polytechnic in 1988, Andy Cairns noticed Fyfe Ewing playing drums in a punk covers band. The two spoke afterwards and agreed to meet for rehearsal in Fyfe's house in Larne with Andy playing a small practice amp and Fyfe playing his kit with brushes. In April 1989 they recorded a four track demo tape (Thirty Seconds of Silence) with Andy playing a bass guitar borrowed from Fyfe's classmate Michael McKeegan. Deciding to play live, they recruited McKeegan and played their debut gig at the Belfast Art College supporting Decadence Within on 20 August 1989. They followed this up with another four track demo tape (Meat Abstract). Their sound was becoming highly influenced by artists of the indie rock movement such as The Jesus Lizard, Big Black, and The Membranes as well as new beat disco acts such as Belgian outfit Erotic Dissidents.

Therapy? released its first single, called Meat Abstract in July 1990. The single was limited to 1,000 copies and released on the band's own Multifuckinational Records. During the summer of that year, the band made its first tour through the United Kingdom with The Beyond, catching the attention of influential DJ John Peel along the way. The band's early years followed the familiar pattern of hard graft on the local alternative music scene, with Cairns often putting in a full day at the Michelin tyre factory (where he worked as a quality controller), then speeding across Northern Ireland in order to make it to gigs. The band also took whatever support slot they could, opening for the likes of Loop, Ride, Teenage Fanclub, Inspiral Carpets, Tad, Fugazi and Ned's Atomic Dustbin. Therapy? quickly came to the attention of local music fans with their distinctively uncompromising style. Their use of guitar feedback as a "fourth instrument" and unconventional song structures, combined with a darkly original approach to lyrics and imaginative use of samples pulled from cult movies and obscure documentaries, led them to be spotted in 1990 by London-based independent label Wiiija Records. The move was helped by Lesley Rankine of Silverfish, who passed the band's first single on to Gary Walker of Wiiija.

The band's first album, July 1991's Babyteeth, and its January 1992 follow-up, Pleasure Death, were successful enough to earn the band a major label deal with A&M Records. Both albums were underground successes, hitting number 1 in the UK Indie Charts. The attention led to support slots with both Babes in Toyland and Hole on their respective UK tours. A compilation of the two albums titled Caucasian Psychosis was prepared for the North American market, and the band embarked on their first U.S. tour in October 1992.

Their debut A&M record, Nurse, made its way into UK's Top 40 Album Chart in November 1992, while lead single "Teethgrinder" became the band's first Top 40 single in both the UK and Ireland. The grunge revolution was in full swing, with US outfit Nirvana leading the way. Predictably, the media began to draw comparisons between the two bands. The heavy guitars and inventive drumming that was swiftly becoming Therapy?'s trademark led them more towards the grunge camp than away from it.

=== The success (1993–1995) ===
If there was one true "breakthrough" year in the band's history, it would almost certainly be 1993. The release of the Shortsharpshock EP catapulted Therapy? into the Top 40, peaking at nine, featuring the lead track "Screamager". The single led to the first of several appearances on the venerable UK music show Top of the Pops. Two more UK Top 40 EPs Face the Strange and Opal Mantra followed, as the band toured heavily on the European festival circuit, made two separate jaunts to the United States in support of Kings X initially, and then both Helmet and The Jesus Lizard, and played their debut shows in Japan. Compilations of the three EP's were released in the U.S. and Japan (Hats Off to the Insane), and in Europe (Born in a Crash).

1994 saw the release of the commercially successful Troublegum album in February which earned the band appearances at a string of rock and indie festivals, including Reading (third consecutive appearance), Donington and Phoenix in the UK alone, as well as a clutch of top 40 singles. It achieved a string of nominations in end-of-year polls, including a Mercury Music Prize nomination, and success at the Kerrang! Awards.

With impatience mounting for a new album, Infernal Love was released in June 1995. This time, the press reaction was lukewarm. The band had attempted to create a "cinematic" record with Belfast DJ David Holmes employed to link each track with "insanity", but in the eyes of many, had produced a disjointed piece over-subscribed with ballads. Despite a second consecutive Donington appearance at Metallica's request, and singles Stories and Loose charting in the UK earlier in the year, it was clear that Therapy? had changed direction. Although the string laden single Diane (originally by Hüsker Dü) was a Top 10 hit in 15 European countries later in the year, much of the early momentum had gone.

=== Ewing quits / Four piece (1996–1998) ===
Fyfe Ewing left the band in January 1996. The band quickly recruited Graham Hopkins as their new drummer. Around this same time Martin McCarrick joined on cello and guitar, having previously performed with the band as an occasional guest. Their new quartet incarnation toured throughout the US and Canada in 1996.

After the tour wound up in October 1996, Therapy? finally took a long break. They reconvened after a few months and spent most of 1997 writing, rehearsing and recording the follow-up to Infernal Love.

While the Church of Noise single in March 1998 failed commercially, it marked the return of the band following three years out of the spotlight. The Semi-Detached album transcended the trajectory of Troublegum and Infernal Love with their dark, broody atmosphere. However, promotion for the album was scant at best, due to problems at the A&M label, which culminated in the loss of their record deal with the company. Without label support, Cairns and McKeegan needed to finance the band's European tour in late 1998 themselves.

=== The turn of the millennium (1999–2003) ===
The band's sentiment towards newer alternative metal bands was expressed in the song Ten Year Plan from the band's uncompromising 1999 Ark21 album Suicide Pact – You First, which was packed full of vitriol, discontent and barely-repressed musical aggression. This album revealed a fuller-sound, yet was noticeably lacking in songs suitable of mainstream-radio airplay.

The following year saw the release of the So Much for the Ten Year Plan: A Retrospective 1990–2000 album which (in title at least) was a self-deprecating poke at the bands' difficulties with corporate rock in recent years. It also allowed the band to fulfill some outstanding obligations to Universal Music.

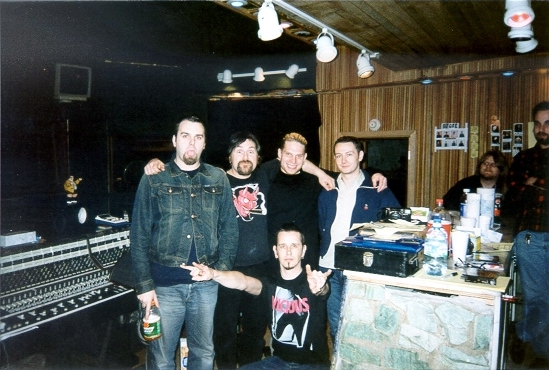
Therapy? in studio (Seattle, 2001), L-R: Graham Hopkins, Andy Cairns, Gabor Szakacsi, Michael McKeegan; Front: Martin McCarrick

Therapy? recorded follow-up record Shameless in early 2001 in Seattle. The album, produced by the legendary Jack Endino, was released by Ark21 in September. Graham Hopkins, who was unhappy with his musical limitation within the band, quit in December 2001. Following Hopkins' departure, the band yet again found themselves without a drummer and a record deal.

The band toured Europe in 2002 with ex-3 Colours Red drummer Keith Baxter. Hopkins was permanently replaced in Therapy? by ex-The Beyond/Cable/Gorilla drummer Neil Cooper, while the band signed a new record deal with Spitfire Records.

This line-up lasted one album, the commercially inclined High Anxiety. The bands' first home video release, a DVD titled Scopophobia was released shortly afterwards, consisting of a full concert recorded live at Belfast's Mandella Hall in June 2003, promo videos and other extras. The band completed a UK tour at the end of 2003 as a three piece, due to McCarrick leaving the tour midway through owing to a perforated eardrum.

=== Back to a three piece (2004–2009) ===
McCarrick left the band permanently in March 2004, and the band were now slimmed down to a permanent three piece again for the first time since 1995. Never Apologise Never Explain was released in September 2004 to an audience re-acquainted with the three-piece Therapy? and was reminiscent of the claustrophobic sound of their earlier material.

The following album One Cure Fits All was released in April 2006. The album, produced by Pedro Ferreira, was a return to the melodic tendencies of High Anxiety and again divided opinion among the band's fans.

On 19 September 2006, Therapy? performed an exclusive studio show of songs chosen by fans who had voted for their three favourite tracks from a lengthy list on the band's website. These votes were counted and the twelve tracks with the most votes were then performed and recorded (both as audio and video). In early 2007, these tracks became available to buy from the band's official website. The Webgig is no longer available to purchase. In addition to this release, the band received some attention from their old record company Universal Records (who own the rights to the band's material recorded on A&M Records) who released both a DVD of old promo clips (Gold) and a double-CD compilation of BBC sessions (Music Through A Cheap Transistor) in 2007. On the touring front, Therapy? focused on markets they had not usually played, including a slot at the NXNE festival in Canada, festival dates in Europe (one of which was as a late replacement for Helmet at the Nova Rock Festival) and a tour through countries such as Romania, Croatia and Serbia, even playing two gigs on Reunion Island, off the East African coast. The band ended 2007 by supporting New Model Army at their Christmas gig in Cologne.

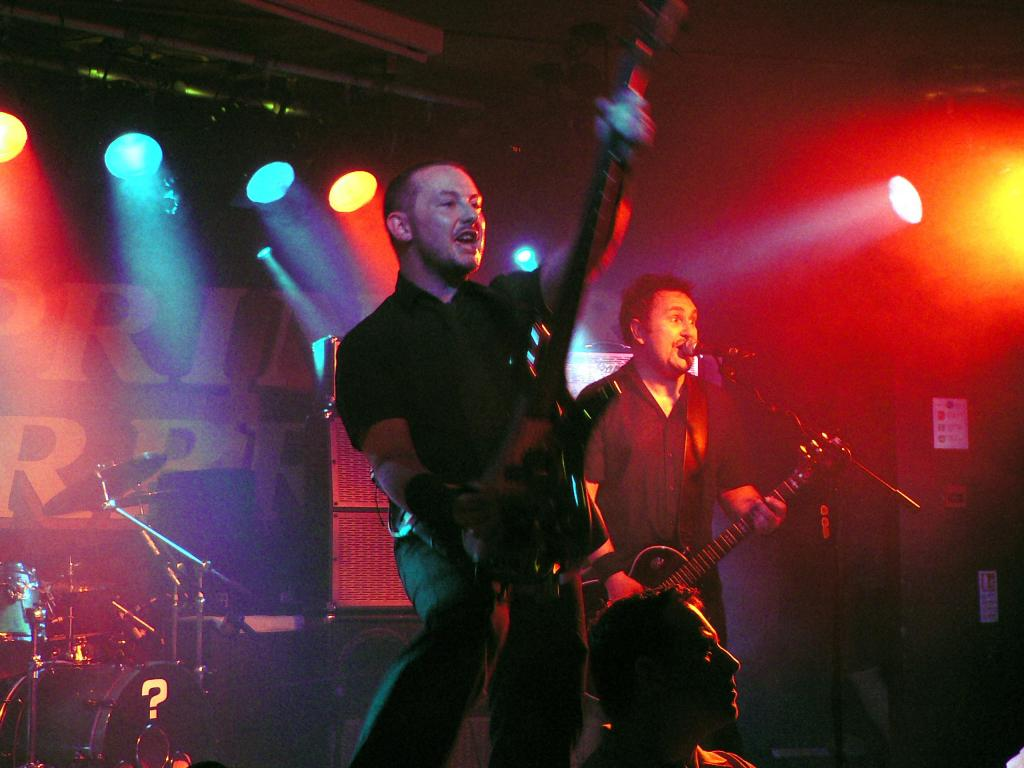
Therapy? performing in 2006

Therapy? were a last minute replacement for Biffy Clyro on the Jägermeister Rock Liga tour of Germany which lasted five dates in February 2008. These dates were the only gigs played in 2008 as the band focused their energies exclusively on recording the new record. Therapy? began recording the new album in late July at Blast Studios in Newcastle and finished recording by late August. It was produced by Andy Gill. Video of rehearsals surfaced on Therapy?'s website offering previews of the new work, showcasing a more rythmetic jazz-influenced direction (Rehearsal), alongside a rough track typical of newer Therapy? output (Clowns Galore). The album, titled Crooked Timber, was released on 23 March 2009 via Blast Records/Global Music. The band performed the new album in its entirety on selected live dates in May, played various European festivals throughout the summer (including a debut appearance at Oxegen in Ireland and a second outing at England's Download) and toured Europe extensively from October to December.

=== 20th anniversary (2010–2013) ===
To mark the 20th anniversary of their debut commercial recording release, Therapy? performed for three consecutive nights at London's Monto Water Rats in March which were recorded for the bands' first official live album titled We're Here to the End, released in November. A deluxe gold edition of 2009's Crooked Timber album was released on 19 July. Therapy? also appeared at European festivals in the summer, including at Knebworth Sonisphere on 31 July when the band performed the Troublegum album in its entirety. Later in 2010, the band performed several "Troublegum & more" sets throughout Europe as part of their 20th anniversary celebrations.

In December 2010, the band began recording their thirteenth studio album, titled A Brief Crack of Light, in Newcastle's Blast Studio. The album recording was completed in February 2011 and mixing began in March. In late May 2011, the group announced a change of plan for the new album; another recording session was planned for June in order to record new songs that had emerged. Those songs were mixed in July 2011 and included, along with songs from the first session, for the new album. The album was released in February 2012. A preceding single and video titled Living in the Shadow of the Terrible Thing was released in January 2012.

In May 2013, Cairns embarked on his first ever solo acoustic tour of the UK, as well as some dates in Europe. To especially mark the tour, he released a CD of acoustic material for sale exclusively at the shows, comprising 12 Therapy? songs, 6 original tracks freshly written for the tour and a cover version, all recorded in late April in Newcastle's Blast Studios

The Gemil Box was released on 18 November 2013; a career-spanning box set of rare and unreleased material. Contents included remastered versions of Nurse, Troublegum, Infernal Love and Semi-Detached, three CDs of rare and unreleased tracks, a DVD of the band's 2010 Sonisphere performance of the Troublegum album, official bootlegs of London ULU '91 and London Mean Fiddler '92, a 12" vinyl of their early demo releases and a cassette of a live recording from Dublin 1990.

Deluxe Edition releases of both Troublegum and Infernal Love were released by Universal Music on 31 March 2014. The band promoted these releases with a series of retro video and audio uploads to their official YouTube channel, proceeding a short UK tour in early April. A compilation of singles from 1992 to 1998 followed on 14 April 2014 via Spectrum Records, a subsidiary of Universal Music, titled Stories: The Singles Collection.

=== Disquiet and acoustic shows (2014–2017) ===
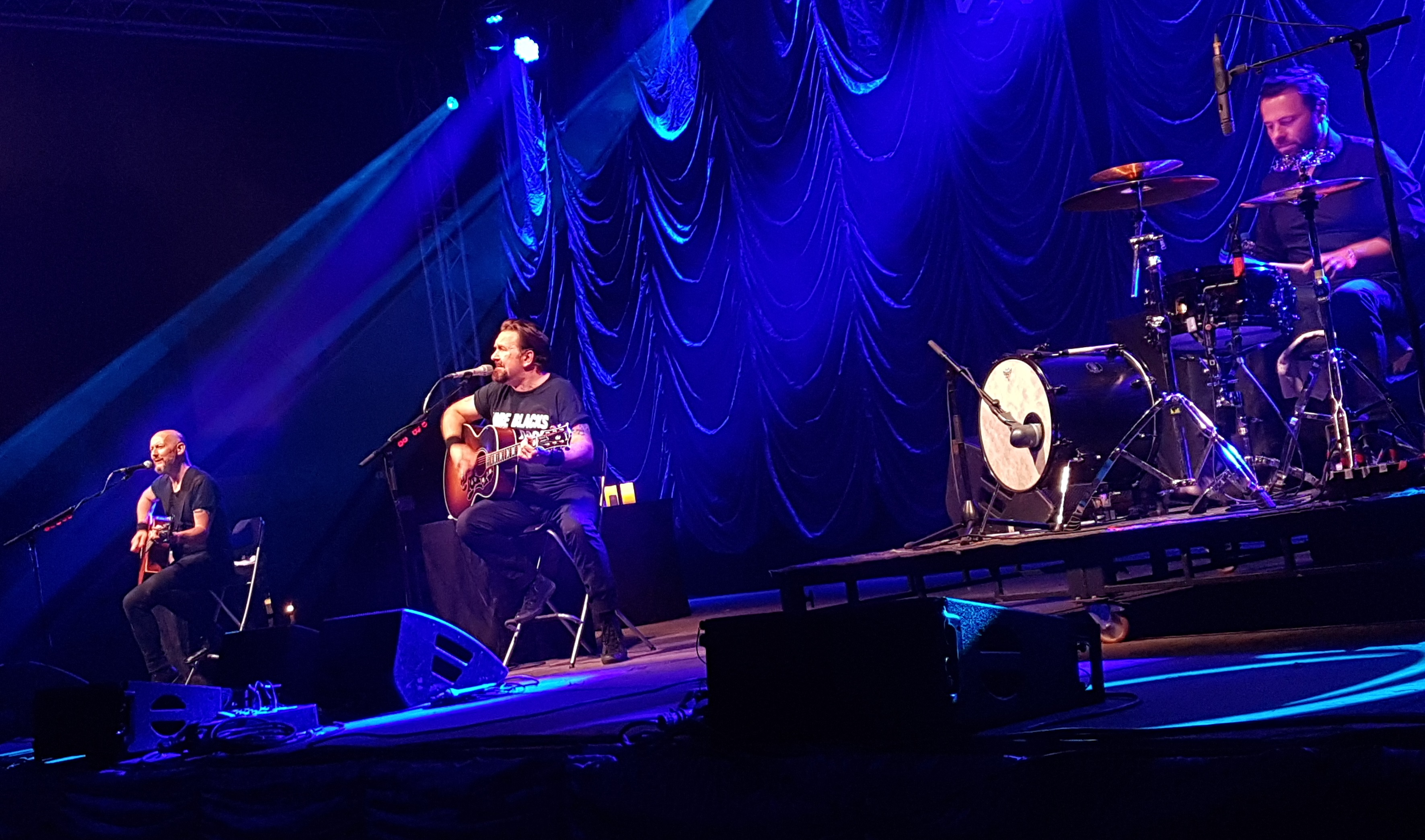
Therapy? at Beautiful Days Festival 2017

On 18 February 2014, the band began pre-production on studio album number 14 with producer Tom Dalgety in their now usual surroundings of Blast Studios in Newcastle. The session finished on 28 February with 18 tracks laid down in demo form. Having chosen 11 songs, the band began recording the album proper on 17 April 2014 and it was completed on 30 April 2014. The album, titled Disquiet, was released on the bands' new record label on 23 March 2015. Pre-orders of the album were announced on 23 February 2015 and included an instant download of two album tracks and an exclusive pre-order track called We Kill People. A digital only single called Still Hurts, featuring two more non-album tracks, was released on 9 March 2015.

The band began the first leg of their Disquiet Tour in the UK in March, before taking in the Netherlands, Belgium and Germany, and returning to the UK throughout April. Their performance in Utrecht was filmed by 'Quantum VR Media' for a future 360 VR release. In early May, Therapy? recorded a session for XFM, their 4th overall following previous sessions in 2001, 2004 and 2012. Deathstimate was released as a download only single on 30 October 2015. The single Tides was released on 15 April 2016, although it was available in early March to purchase on limited edition CD at the bands' UK tour performing the Infernal Love album in its entirety. Summer festivals on the European circuit followed, including a date at the Wacken Open Air in Germany. Therapy? performed a fully acoustic "Wood & Wire" tour through Belgium, Holland, Austria, Germany and the UK from 14 November until 1 December 2016. A newly recorded 11-track acoustic album titled Wood & Wire was available for purchase on CD at these shows. A six date Irish Wood & Wire tour took place in April 2017.

On 21 July 2017, the band announced a double live acoustic album, Communion: Live at the Union Chapel, for release on 21 August 2017. The album was recorded in London on 1 December 2016 during the "Wood & Wire" European tour.

=== Cleave (2018–2019) ===
On 15 January 2018 the band began recording their 15th studio album at Blast Recording in Newcastle with Chris Sheldon producing. Recording was completed on 6 February 2018. In March, the band completed a 22-date UK and Ireland tour supporting The Stranglers.

On 10 May 2018, the band announced via their social media that they signed a worldwide record deal with Marshall Records:

"Absolutely delighted to announce we have signed to @marshallrecs for a worldwide deal! The first single, "Callow", from our 15th album "CLEAVE" will be released Fri May 25th 2018"

A second single, "Wreck It Like Beckett", was released as a digital download on 7 September 2018, preceding the release of Cleave on 21 September 2018, following an extensive Pledge Music pre-order campaign which featured signed CDs, coloured vinyl, black vinyl and test presses.

"Kakistocracy" was released as a digital-only single along with a music video on 24 January 2019.

=== 30th anniversary (2020–2022) ===
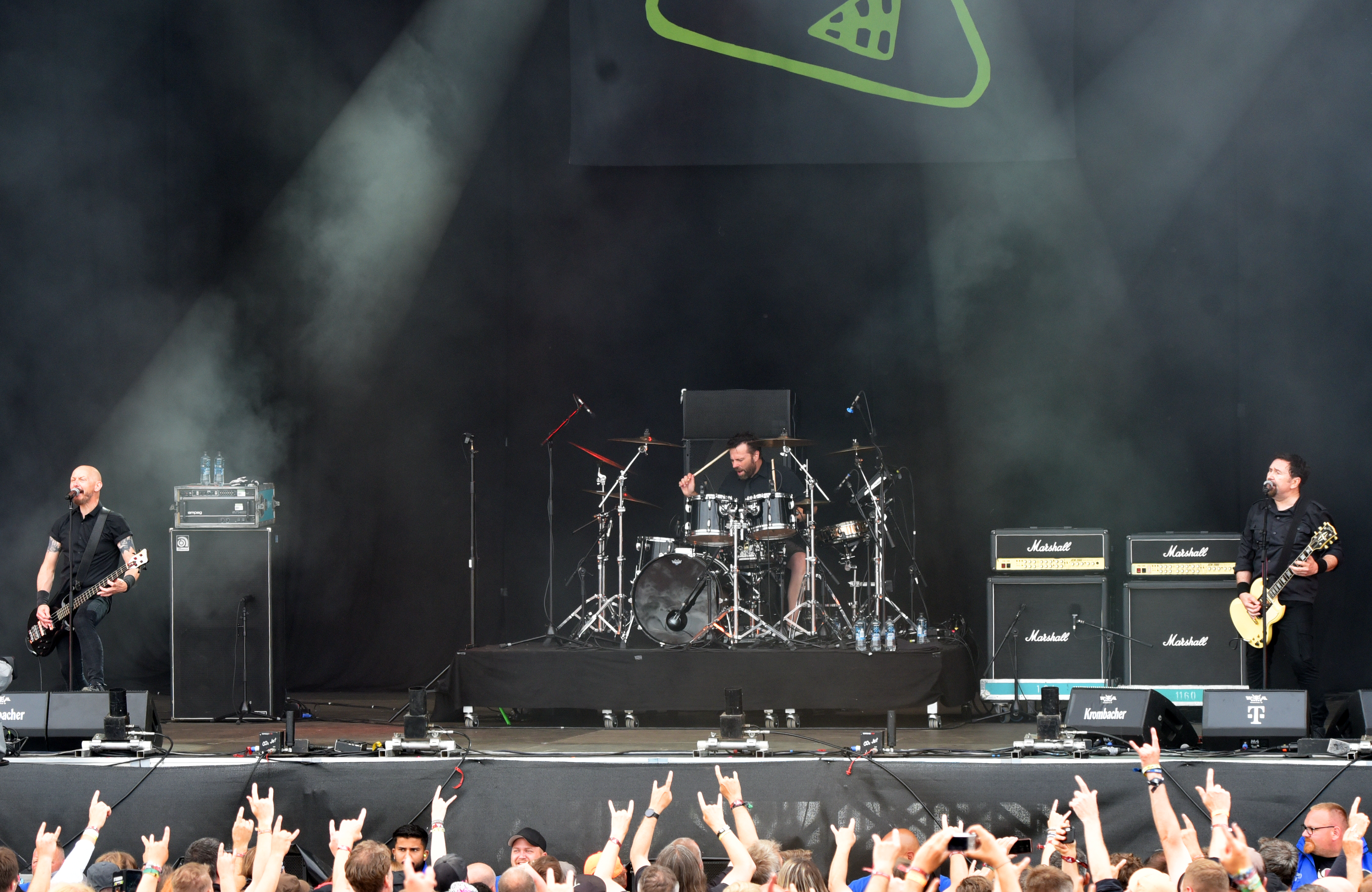
Therapy? at Wacken Open Air 2022

On 16 January 2020, the band announced that they would be releasing a greatest hits compilation, titled Greatest Hits (The Abbey Road Session). The album featured newly re-recorded versions of 12 Top 40 UK singles spanning the albums Nurse, Troublegum, Infernal Love, and Semi-Detached, and was recorded at the venerable Abbey Road Studios in November 2019.

The band was due to embark on a European tour in support of the album beginning in March; however, due to the COVID-19 pandemic, they postponed the tour until October 2020. In June 2020, they rescheduled the tour again for spring 2021. Once more, in March 2021, the tour was rescheduled to begin in January 2022. The over 18 months between the last show of 2019 and the first show of 2021 (a festival date in July which was one of only three gigs in 2021) was the longest the group has ever gone between shows in their existence. Therapy? spent the majority of 2022 touring the UK and Europe to celebrate their 30-year anniversary, since re-dubbed the "So Much for the 32 Year Plan" tour. The band rounded up the 30th anniversary celebrations by doing a special "Love Your Early Stuff" UK tour in November - December 2022, playing cities they rarely visited and a setlist including rarities and less often played songs.

On 2 November 2021, the band announced that their major label debut Nurse would be reissued by Caroline Records on 26 November 2021. The remastered 2CD version contained b-sides and previously unreleased demo tracks. There was also a vinyl release.

=== Hard Cold Fire (2023–present) ===
The band's 16th studio album, Hard Cold Fire, was released on 5 May 2023. The album was recorded in November 2021 at Marshall Studios with producer Chris Sheldon. Due to touring commitments in 2022 related to the delayed 30th anniversary tour, the album had been shelved for 18 months. The album was released across three formats, including CD, cassette and six colour vinyl variants.

In February 2023, supergroup JAAW (featuring Cairns on vocals) announced their debut album called Supercluster to be released on 26 May 2023 on Svart Records.

In April 2026, Therapy? headlined the first day of Takedown festival 2026 after Phil Campbell and the Bastard Sons dropped out due to Campbell's illness and subsequent passing.

== Question mark suffix ==
Much has been made over the years of the unusual question mark suffix to the band's name. In early interviews the band said that the name was "really deep" and intended to raise the question "do you need therapy?", but in a 1992 interview guitarist Andy Cairns admitted that it was a chance design when he was working on the band's first record sleeve. Working with Letraset transfers, Cairns misaligned the band's name, and used the "?" icon to fill the space to the right. "And then we thought, well maybe we can bluff our way through when people start reading into it."

== Collaborations and other appearances ==
Therapy? collaborated with the short-lived rap group Fatal (part of the Soul Assassin camp, not to be confused with the hip hop artist Fatal) on the track "Come and Die" from the soundtrack to the 1993 film Judgment Night. Cairns has contributed vocals and guitar to various recordings with different bands throughout the years – "Jonestown Mind" (1994) and "Waiting For Earthquakes" (2001) by The Almighty, "Rehab" (2000) by UK band Manchild, "Radio" (2001) by UK band Dog Toffee (although this version remains unreleased), "Gleason" (2002) by Northern Irish band Throat, "Get Your Groove On" (2003) by The Wildhearts, "F8" (2005) by This Is Menace, "The Second Triumvirate of Lavonia" (2009) by Italian band Inferno, "Crisis? What Crisis?" and "Ignite" (2014) by UK band Thirty Six Strategies and "Celebrating Sinking" (2015) by Ricky Warwick. Therapy? appear on the 2005 "Welt Turbojugend Tage" DVD, performing three songs live in Hamburg. Therapy?, along with Biohazard and Gunshot, contributed with remixes on Pitchshifter's 1995 album, The Remix War.

Some of their songs were used in movies and video games. "Auto Surgery" and "Teethgrinder" are featured on Electronic Arts' video game Road Rash for the 3DO, Sega Saturn, and PlayStation consoles, while "Nowhere" is featured on EA Sports's video game NCAA Football 2006 for the Xbox, GameCube, and PlayStation 2 consoles.

"Accelerator" appears in Dominic Sena's 1993 movie Kalifornia while "He's Not That Kind of Girl" and "God Kicks" appear in John Carney's 2001 movie On the Edge, starring Cillian Murphy. "Screamager" and "Nowhere" are heard on the first series of the BBC sitcom Game On. "Speedball" appears in the movie S.F.W.

== Influences ==
Therapy? covered Black Sabbath's "Iron Man", and other songs such the Police's "Invisible Sun", the Misfits' "Where Eagles Dare", the Smiths' "Vicar in a Tutu" and Turbonegro's "Denim Demon". Cairns cited in his other favorite bands, Siouxsie and the Banshees for John McGeoch's guitar playing on the album Juju, and Captain Beefheart and his Magic Band for the album Trout Mask Replica. Other influences they have cited include Stiff Little Fingers, the Undertones, the Ruts, the Outcasts, Rudi, FUAL, Pink Turds In Space, LMS, Strontium Dogs, the Membranes, Sonic Youth, Captain Beefheart, Minor Threat, Operation Ivy, Funkadelic, James Brown, Squirrel Bait, Snuff, Die Kreuzen, Minutemen, Big Black, N.W.A, Public Enemy, Silverfish, Stretcheads, the Stooges and MC5.

The band's songs and artwork often reference the work of Irish novelist and playwright Samuel Beckett.

== Equipment ==
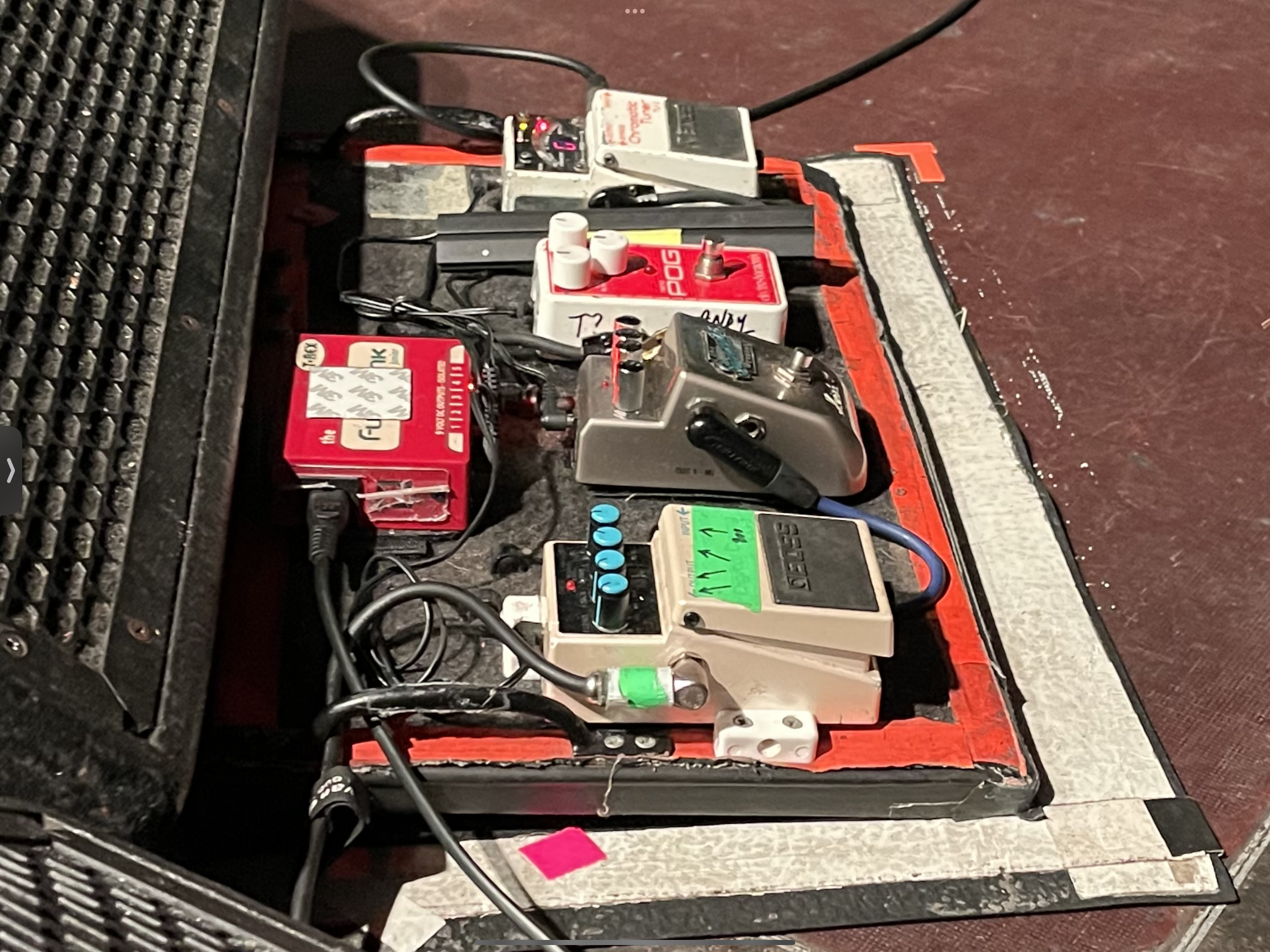
Andy Cairns guitar effects pedalboard

Andy Cairns uses several Gibson SG and a Gibson Explorer. He has changed his effects pedals a few times. As of November 2023, he used a small pedalboard powered by a T-Rex Fuel Tank Junior: Boss Chromatic Tuner → Electro-Harmonix POG Nano → Marshall SV-1 Supervibe → Boss Digital Delay.

== Band members ==
Current members

- Andy Cairns – guitar, lead vocals (1989–present)
- Michael McKeegan – bass, backing vocals (1989–present)
- Neil Cooper – drums (2002–present)

Former members

- Fyfe Ewing – drums, backing and lead vocals (1989–1996)
- Graham Hopkins – drums, backing vocals (1996–2001)
- Martin McCarrick – guitar, cello, backing vocals, piano (1996–2004; touring 1992, 1994, 1995)

Former touring musicians

- Charlie McKeegan – drums (1990, 1999, 2003)
- Rosie Wetters – cello (1995)
- Keith Baxter – drums (2002, 2003; died 2008)
- Stevie Firth – guitar, backing vocals (2010–2019)
- Adam Sinclair – drums (2012)
- Alan Lynn – drums (2012)
- Herb Magee – bass, backing vocals (2014)
- Jenny Nendick – cello (2016)

== Discography ==
- Babyteeth (1991)
- Pleasure Death (1992)
- Nurse (1992)
- Troublegum (1994)
- Infernal Love (1995)
- Semi-Detached (1998)
- Suicide Pact – You First (1999)
- Shameless (2001)
- High Anxiety (2003)
- Never Apologise Never Explain (2004)
- One Cure Fits All (2006)
- Crooked Timber (2009)
- A Brief Crack of Light (2012)
- Disquiet (2015)
- Cleave (2018)
- Hard Cold Fire (2023)
