= Tom Rogerson =

British musician

Tom Rogerson is a British musician. He is the founder of Three Trapped Tigers and has also made music with others, such as Finding Shore (2017) with Brian Eno.

== Career ==
Rogerson is from Suffolk. He studied at the Royal Academy of Music in London and lived for a time in New York City, where he played jazz with Reid Anderson. He is the founder of Three Trapped Tigers, in which he sings and plays piano and keyboards. The Suffolk landscape inspired Finding Shore, on which Rogerson plays improvised piano.

== Discography ==
=== Solo ===
- Piano and Voice (1999)
- For Mannie: Live at the Pumphouse (2003)
- Tom Rogerson (2005) – with Reid Anderson, Michael Lewis, Christian Hebel and Michael Spyro
- Live at the Luminaire (2006)
- Retreat to Bliss (2022)

=== With Three Trapped Tigers ===
- Route One or Die (Blood and Biscuits, 2011)
- Numbers: 1-13 (Blood and Biscuits, 2012)
- Silent Earthling (Superball, 2016)

=== With others ===
- Cable Street Shorts (Loop, 2010) – with Tomas Challenger
- Finding Shore (Dead Oceans, 2017) – with Brian Eno

=== With contributions by Rogerson ===
- First Love (Close Harbour, 2009) by Emmy the Great – co-producer
- Five American Portraits (Drag City, 2010) by Red Krayola and Art & Language – Rogerson plays piano
