= Pleasure Death =

Studio album by Therapy?
- Released: 27 January 1992
- Recorded: 14–15 August 1991
- Studio: Southern Studios, London, England
- Genre: Noise rock; alternative rock; alternative metal
- Length: 22:25
- Label: Wiiija Records
- Producer: Harvey Birrell, Therapy?

Therapy? chronology
Babyteeth (1991)	Pleasure Death (1992)	Caucasian Psychosis (1992)

Professional ratings
Review scores
Source	Rating
AllMusic	2/5 stars

Pleasure Death is the second mini-album by the Northern Irish rock band Therapy? It was released on 27 January 1992 by Wiiija Records on 12" vinyl. The album was recorded on 14 and 15 August 1991 and mixed on 16 and 17 August 1991 at Southern Studios in London. It reached number 1 on the UK Indie Charts.

The mini-album was collected, together with Babyteeth, as the compilation Caucasian Psychosis in 1992. In 1993, Southern Records re-issued the album on 12" vinyl, CD and cassette.

The album was remastered in 2010 by Harvey Birrell and has been touted for possible release since then, although nothing has been confirmed as yet.

== Track listing ==
All songs written by Therapy?

No.	Title	Length
1.	"Skinning Pit"	6:01
2.	"Fantasy Bag"	3:40
3.	"Shitkicker"	2:33
4.	"Prison Breaker"	4:26
5.	"D.L.C."	2:32
6.	"Potato Junkie"	3:09
Total length:		22:25

== Personnel ==
Therapy?

- Andy Cairns – vocals, guitar
- Fyfe Ewing – vocals, drums
- Michael McKeegan – bass

Technical

- Harvey Birrell and Therapy? – producer
- Harvey Birrell and John Loder – engineers

== Trivia ==
- The sample in "Skinning Pit" ("Every once in a while I'd have to take a beating. But by then, I didn't care. The way I saw it, everybody takes a beating sometime") is taken from the 1990 movie Goodfellas and is spoken by actor Ray Liotta.
- The sample in "Potato Junkie" ("Don't you ever feel attracted to the girls you photograph…") is often cited as having come from the 1978 movie Pretty Baby, being spoken by actress Brooke Shields and actor Keith Carradine, but is in fact from the 1981 ozploitation film Centrespread, being spoken by actress Kylie Foster and actor Paul Trahair.
