= High Anxiety (Therapy? album) =

Album by Therapy?

Studio album by Therapy?
- Released: 5 May 2003 (UK, EUR); 20 May 2003 (US)
- Recorded: December 2002 – January 2003
- Studios: Parkgate Studios, Hastings, England
- Genres: Alternative rock, alternative metal
- Length: 40:32
- Label: Spitfire Records
- Producers: Pete Bartlett, Therapy?

Therapy? chronology
Shameless (2001)	High Anxiety (2003)	Never Apologise Never Explain (2004)

Singles from Anxiety
- 1. "If It Kills Me" / "Rust" Released: 21 April 2003; 2. "My Voodoo Doll" Released: 17 November 2003

Professional ratings
Review scores
Source	Rating
AllMusic	4/5 stars
RTÉ	4/5 stars

High Anxiety is the seventh full-length album by the rock band Therapy?, and was the first to be released on Spitfire Records. It was released on 5 May 2003. The album was recorded from December 2002 to January 2003 at Parkgate Studios in Hastings.

"High Anxiety" was the first album to feature drummer Neil Cooper, and the last recorded with guitarist/cellist Martin McCarrick, who departed in 2004. The album has a similar production value to Troublegum, and is a return to that album's sense of melodic punk.

The album title is taken from a 1977 Mel Brooks movie of the same name.

The US released limited edition CD-ROM included the video of If It Kills Me. The album reached number 113 in the UK Albums Chart.

The album was released on CD and cassette.

Polish label Metal Mind Productions re-released the album on 2 November 2009. The album was remastered using 24-Bit technology, limited to 1000 numbered copies, on a gold disk digipak CD.

== Track listing ==
All songs written by Therapy?

No.	Title	Length
1.	"Hey Satan – You Rock"	3:08
2.	"Who Knows"	2:50
3.	"Stand in Line"	3:21
4.	"Nobody Here But Us"	3:28
5.	"Watch You Go"	2:14
6.	"If It Kills Me"	3:40
7.	"Not in Any Name"	3:23
8.	"My Voodoo Doll"	2:16
9.	"Limbo"	3:00
10.	"Last Blast"	3:24
11.	"Rust" (Contains hidden track "Never Ending". It starts at 7:00, after 30 seconds of silence [6:30 – 7:00])	9:50
Total length:		40:34

== Personnel ==
Therapy?

- Andy Cairns – vocals, guitar
- Neil Cooper – drums
- Martin McCarrick – guitar, cello
- Michael McKeegan – bass

Technical

- Pete Bartlett – producer
- Therapy? – producer
- Chris Sheldon – mixing, producer "Not in Any Name"
- Dan Turner – engineer
- Mick Hutson – photography
- Curt Evans – design

== Singles ==
- "If It Kills Me"/"Rust" was released on 21 April 2003 with "Mama You Can Call the Ambulance Now" and "If It Kills Me (video)". This single reached number 76 in the UK Singles Chart.
- "My Voodoo Doll" was released on 17 November 2003 with "If It Kills Me (live)", "Screamager (live)" and "Teethgrinder (live)". This CD was signed, limited to 1000 copies and sold at gigs only. Live tracks were recorded at the Mandela Hall, Belfast on 6 June 2003.

== Promo video ==
- "If It Kills Me"

== Charts ==
Chart (2003)	Peak position
Belgian Albums (Ultratop Flanders)	50
Irish Albums (IRMA)	55
UK Albums (OCC)	113
