= Cable (British band) =

Indie rock band

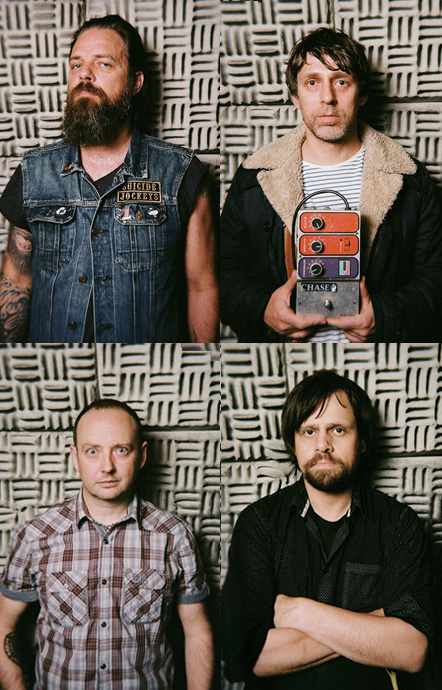
- Cable in 2012. Clockwise from top left: Mills, Bagguley, Hinks, Darrington.

Background information
- Origin: Derby, England
- Genres: Post-hardcore, indie rock, noise rock, math rock
- Years active: 1992–1999, 2012
- Labels: Krunch! (1994–1995); Infectious (1995–1999)
- Past members: Matt Bagguley; Darius Hinks; Pete Darrington; Richie Mills; Neil Cooper
- Website: Official Website

Cable were an English indie rock band from Derby, who released three studio albums: Down-Lift the Up-Trodden (1996), When Animals Attack (1997) and Sub-Lingual (1999) on Infectious Records.

They split up in 1999, and briefly reformed in 2012.

== Career ==
=== 1992–94: Formation and early career ===
Formed in 1992 by Matt Bagguley and Darius Hinks while attending the University of Derby, Bagguley and Hinks had first met whilst studying Graphic Design at North Warwickshire College of Technology and Art, Nuneaton. Cable were initially inspired by the art-rock leanings of indie labels including Touch and Go, Dischord, Blast First, Southern Records and Shimmy Disc, as well as UK artists such as Spacemen 3 and My Bloody Valentine. The first settled lineup was Matt Bagguley (vocals/guitar), Darius Hinks (guitar), Pete Darrington (bass) and Neil Cooper (drums). Throughout 1993 the band played regularly with underground acts from the US (including Medicine, Polvo, Truman's Water and Rocket From The Crypt).

In early 1994 their debut single "Sale of the Century" was released on 7" by Derby-based indie label Krunch! Records. BBC Radio 1 DJ John Peel played it on his show and asked the band to record a session. Peel remained a loyal fan, and Cable recorded four Peel Sessions.

=== 1995: Down-Lift the Up-Trodden ===
In 1995 Cable released their first album for Infectious Records; Down-Lift the Up-Trodden was produced by ex-Membranes frontman John Robb, and in the week of its release was played in its entirety on the John Peel show. The band played the Reading Festival in the summer of 1995, and toured the UK with Glasgow's AC Acoustics. At the end of the tour the band were involved in a near-fatal car accident when their bus was hit by a drunk driver at high speed, flipping the vehicle onto its roof. Drummer Neil Cooper quit in order to concentrate on his own projects, and was replaced by Richie Mills.

=== 1996–97: When Animals Attack ===
In 1996, Cable played over 100 shows with artists such as The Wedding Present, China Drum, Reef and Garageland (Flying Nun Records). They recorded another session for Radio 1, toured Germany and appeared at The Phoenix Festival. In 1997, the band played a concert at Brixton Prison (which was later released as a live EP), and shortly afterwards flew to New York to record their second album, this time produced by ex-Butthole Surfer, and Shimmy Disc owner Kramer. The album When Animals Attack was recorded in three weeks at Noise New Jersey, and released the following spring. Album track "Freeze The Atlantic" was used as the soundtrack on a TV commercial for Sprite which exposed the band to a much broader audience, and was later released as a single.

=== 1998–99: Sub-Lingual and split ===
In March 1998 Cable played a sellout show at South by Southwest in Austin, Texas, then returned to the UK to record their third album with Paul Tipler (known for his work with Elastica and Stereolab). That same year they were nominated for 'Best New British Band' at the Kerrang! Awards. At the 1998 Sound City festival in Oxford, John Peel joined the band onstage and the concert was broadcast live on Steve Lamacq's Radio 1 show. However, in spring 1999 a long-simmering legal dispute brought the band's career to an abrupt halt, and on 19 May Cable played a packed farewell concert at London Dingwalls, before splitting. Their third album Sub-Lingual was well received by both the indie & rock press, albeit posthumously.

=== 2006–present ===
In 2006 the label Signature Tune released a covers compilation album titled Souvenir: A Tribute to Cable, a collection of 15 newly recorded Cable songs performed by artists including Tom Vek, Get Cape. Wear Cape. Fly, Gordon Moakes, and Tellison.

Cable announced in June 2012 that they were to reform to play three dates in November of that year at Manchester Academy and London Forum., and also a homecoming show at Derby's The Venue.

Matt Bagguley now lives in Oslo and plays in Je Suis Animal. Other ex-Cable members can be found in The Lucky Nine featuring drummer Richie Mills, and previously Hudson Super Six featuring Pete Darrington until their split in 2017. Mills also now fronts the band MiLLS in which he is vocalist and guitarist. Neil Cooper has been the drummer for alternative metal band Therapy? since 2002.

== Discography ==
=== Albums ===
- Down-Lift the Up-Trodden (1996)
- When Animals Attack (1997)
- Sub-Lingual (1999)

=== Singles ===
- "Sale of the Century" (1994, Krunch! Records)
- "Seventy/Oubliette" (1995, Krunch! Records)
- "Seventy" (1995)
- "Blindman" (1995)
- "Whisper Firing Line" (1996)
- "Blue Birds Are Blue" (1997)
- "Freeze the Atlantic" (1997)
- "God Gave Me Gravity" (1997)
- "Arthur Walker" (1998)

=== EPs and promotional releases ===
- Soundbites (1997, a promo pack for When Animals Attack)
- Live at Brixton Prison (1997, live EP)
- Demos and Unreleased Songs (2012, available at reformation gigs)

=== Music videos ===
- "Whisper Firing Line" (1996)
- "Blue Birds Are Blue" (1997)
- "Freeze the Atlantic" (1997)
- "God Gave Me Gravity" (1997)
- "Arthur Walker" (1998)
