= Route One or Die =

Studio album by Three Trapped Tigers
- Released: 30 May 2011
- Length: 42:49
- Label: Blood and Biscuits

Three Trapped Tigers chronology
Route One or Die (2011)	Silent Earthling (2016)

Professional ratings
Aggregate scores
Source	Rating
Metacritic	84/100
Review scores
Source	Rating
The 405	9/10
Clash	7/10
Drowned in Sound	7/10
Loud and Quiet	9/10
MusicOMH	4/5 stars
NME	8/10
No Ripcord	9/10
The Skinny	4/5 stars

Route One or Die is the debut studio album by British experimental rock band Three Trapped Tigers. It was released on 30 May 2011 by Blood and Biscuits Records.

== Release ==
Three Trapped Tigers announced the release of their debut studio Route One or Die on 4 March 2011.

The first single "Cramm" was released on 8 March 2011.

On 1 June 2011, Three Trapped Tigers released the music video "Noise Trade".

== Tour ==
In support of the album, the band went on a UK tour with indie band Tall Ships in May 2011.

== Critical reception ==
Route One or Die was met with "universal acclaim" reviews from critics. At Metacritic, which assigns a weighted average rating out of 100 to reviews from mainstream publications, this release received an average score of 84 based on 6 reviews.

In a review for Loud and Quiet, Matthias Scherer explained: "Route One or Die contains eight pieces of music that are melodic and thunderously fun. It's the latter quality that is often hard to pull off in instrumental music, but Three Trapped Tigers combine electronic influences with riffs Mastodon could do worse than rip off. Mark Davison at No Ripcord said: "Route One or Die is many things – immense, joyful, weird and above all aptly titled, as you'd be hard-pressed to find another debut album released this year – British or otherwise – that sounds so completely vibrant and alive." In The 405, Tom Davenport wrote: "Three Trapped Tigers are simply a rock band with the bravery to try anything. Some of this album feels like genuinely new ground, and it is a joy to comprehend. While Route One Or Die might fall short of perfection, it will remain a masterpiece."

=== Accolades ===
Publications' year-end list appearances for Route One or Die
Critic/Publication	List	Rank	Ref
DIY	DIY's Top 50 Albums of 2011	23	
The Line of Best Fit	The Line of Best Fit's Top 50 Albums of 2011	42	

== Track listing ==
Route or Die track listing
No.	Title	Length
1.	"Cramm"	4:58
2.	"Noise Trade"	4:58
3.	"Creepies"	5:39
4.	"Ulnastrictor"	5:24
5.	"Zil"	4:09
6.	"Drebin"	4:46
7.	"Magne"	6:52
8.	"Reset"	6:03
