= Suicide Pact – You First =

Studio album by Therapy?
- Released: 18 October 1999 (UK); 8 February 2000 (USA)
- Recorded: July–August 1999
- Studio: Great Linford Manor, Milton Keynes, England
- Genre: Alternative rock; noise rock; alternative metal
- Length: 71:11
- Label: Ark 21
- Producer: Head

Therapy? chronology
Semi-Detached (1998)	Suicide Pact – You First (1999)	So Much for the Ten Year Plan (2000)

Singles from Suicide Pact – You First
- 1. "Hate Kill Destroy" Released: 6 March 2000

Professional ratings
Review scores
Source	Rating
Allmusic	2.5/5 stars
Metal Hammer	8/10 stars
NME	5/10 stars

Suicide Pact – You First is the fifth full-length album by the band Therapy?, and the first to be released by their third record company Ark21, following the demise of the band's previous label. It was released on 18 October 1999 and recorded at Great Linford Manor in Milton Keynes from 13 July to 15 August 1999. The album is by far their longest running record at 71 minutes.

The album was a move away from the pop sensibilities of their previous album, Semi-Detached, and was considered a dark and twisted effort, seemingly as a retort to the conditions and restrictions imposed upon them and other bands on major labels. Although the album garnered very little radio airplay, and only reached number 61 in the UK Albums Chart, it received mixed reviews in the press.

The album was released on CD and cassette. The US released limited edition CD-ROM included the video of "Little Tongues First".

The song "Six Mile Water" was written by Cairns about the end of his friendship with ex-Therapy? drummer Fyfe Ewing.

== Track listing ==
All songs written by Therapy?.

No.	Title	Length
1.	"He's Not that Kind of Girl"	3:25
2.	"Wall of Mouths"	4:06
3.	"Jam Jar Jail"	4:45
4.	"Hate Kill Destroy"	3:33
5.	"Big Cave In"	5:46
6.	"Six Mile Water"	6:22
7.	"Little Tongues First"	4:25
8.	"Ten Year Plan"	5:13
9.	"God Kicks"	2:41
10.	"Other People's Misery"	1:53
11.	"Sister" (contains hidden track "Whilst I Pursue My Way Unharmed" at 16:06, after 11 minutes of silence [5:06–16:06])	29:00
Total length:		71:11

The Japanese edition featured two live tracks as bonuses, with album closer and hidden track "Whilst I Pursue My Way Unharmed" moved to the end of the second bonus track:

No.	Title	Length
1.	"He's Not that Kind of Girl"	3:25
2.	"Wall of Mouths"	4:08
3.	"Jam Jar Jail"	4:45
4.	"Hate Kill Destroy"	3:33
5.	"Big Cave In"	5:46
6.	"Six Mile Water"	6:22
7.	"Little Tongues First"	4:25
8.	"Ten Year Plan"	5:13
9.	"God Kicks"	2:41
10.	"Other People's Misery"	1:53
11.	"Sister"	5:06
12.	"Little Tongues First" (Live)	5:00
13.	"He's Not that Kind of Girl (live)" (contains hidden track "Whilst I Pursue My Way Unharmed" at 8:15, after 5:10 of silence [3:05–8:15])	21:10
Total length:		74:00

== Singles ==
- "Hate Kill Destroy" was released on 6 March 2000 with live versions of "Six Mile Water" and "Sister". This single was released in Germany only and a limited edition of 2000 copies. Live tracks recorded in Brussels, Belgium on 8 December 1999.
- "Six Mile Water" was released in 2000 as a radio promotional single, featuring album and radio edits, as well as a live version, of the title track.

== Promo videos ==
- "Little Tongues First": directed by Nigel Rolfe

== Personnel ==
Therapy?

- Andy Cairns – vocals, guitar
- Graham Hopkins – drums, backing vocals
- Michael McKeegan – bass, backing vocals
- Martin McCarrick – guitar, cello, vocals

with:

- Kimberley McCarrick – violin

Technical

- Head – producer, guitar
- Nigel Rolfe – photography
- Steve Gullick – photography
- Therapy?/Insect – design

== Charts ==
Chart (1999)	Peak position
Belgian Albums (Ultratop Flanders)	44
Scottish Albums (OCC)	71
UK Albums (OCC)	61
