= ATL Rock School =

ATL Rock School was a BBC Northern Ireland television programme, part of ATL TV. The programme aimed to highlight new music bands in Northern Ireland.

Band members had to be aged between 16 and 21 and resident in Northern Ireland. Judges looked for entries from every style and genre, from pop to heavy metal and everything in between. It was broadcast as part of Across the Line on BBC Radio Ulster.

Past winners of the competition:

- 2008 - The Good Fight
- 2007 - Nice'n'Sleezy
- 2006 - The Tides
