= The Water Rats =

Live music venue

- The Pindar of Wakefield
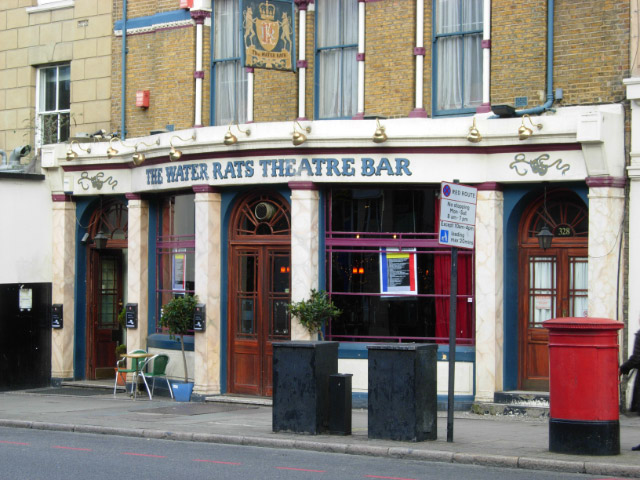
- Interactive map of The Water Rats
- Former names: The Pindar of Wakefield
- Address: Gray's Inn Road; London, WC1; United Kingdom
- Coordinates: 51.52899°N 0.11965°W
- Owner: Sally Fox
- Capacity: 200
- Type: Theatre, pub
- Current use: Live Music Comedy Breakfast Lunch Dinner Cocktails Venue Special Events and Filming contact venue for more info
- Public transit: King's Cross St Pancras; King's Cross; St Pancras

Construction
- Opened: 1992; 34 years ago
- Rebuilt: Full restoration, refurbishment and rebuild July 2015 - Originally built in 1517 when the landlord was George Green, one-time Pindar of Wakefield, who was supposed to have had connections with Robin Hood. The present house, built in 1878, was once patronised by Karl Marx and Lenin. Until the 1980s it housed a regular 'All Time ComedyMusic Hall' by the prestigious Aba Daba Company In 1986 the premises were bought by the Grand Order of Water Rats and the name was changed to the Water Rats. - London Encyclopaedia ** Theatre, music and comedy continued into the late 1990's providing a spot for West End Actors to drink, and be entertained after hours. 1723 The Pindar of Wakefield Public house in Grays Inn Road is badly damaged in a thunderstorm, the landlords two daughters are buried in the ruins; the pub is rebuilt on the opposite side of the road. - **

Website
- http://thewaterratsvenue.london

The Water Rats is a live music venue at 328 Grays Inn Road, Kings Cross, London, England. Until 1992, it was known as The Pindar of Wakefield and was famous for its regular all time comedy music hall entertainment provided by The Aba Daba Company. It was a haunt for West End Actors who needed somewhere to relax and be entertained after their shows. The beautiful theatre at the Pindar of Wakefield was refurbished when The Water Rats took over, with traditional comedy, music hall and revues continuing for many years well into the late 1990's.

Bob Dylan played his first UK gig here in December 1962. The Pogues (then known as the Pogue Mahones) had their first performance here on October 4, 1982 when they played alongside the band Suppose I Laugh, which included Dmytro Morykit. Oasis's debut London performance took place here on 27 January 1994. The Beta Band played their debut show here on Wednesday 23 July 1997. Acts such as Katy Perry, Sisteray, The Courteeners, Ra Ra Riot and Vindicated also appeared here prior to international acclaim. On October 1, 2004, the venue hosted The Decemberists, who were playing their first show outside North America. In 2014, The Water Rats began hosting a weekly quiz night. The venue reopened in October 2015 with a new management.

Originally built in 1517, when the landlord was George Green, one-time Pindar of Wakefield, who was supposed to have had connections with Robin Hood. The present house, built in 1878, was once patronised by Karl Marx and Friedrich Engels. Until the 1980s, it housed a regular 'Old Time Music Hall'. In 1986, the premises were bought by the Grand Order of Water Rats and the name of the venue was changed to the Water Rats.
