= Three Trapped Tigers =

British instrumental experimental rock band

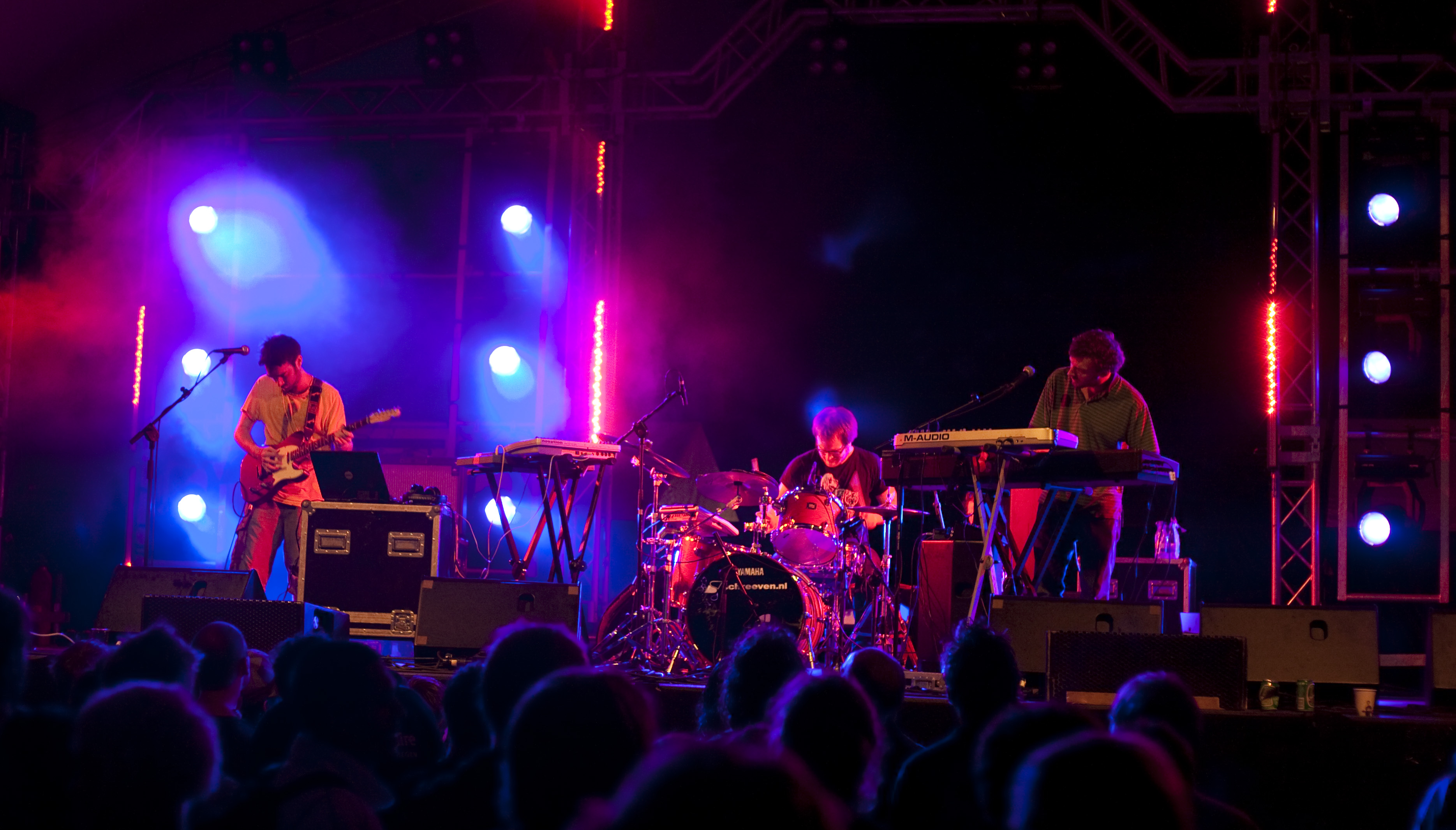
- Three Trapped Tigers performing at de-Affaire 2009

Background information
- Origin: London, England
- Genres: Noise rock, math rock, IDM
- Years active: 2007–2024
- Labels: Blood and Biscuits, Superball
- Members: Adam Betts; Matt Calvert; Tom Rogerson
- Website: www.threetrappedtigers.com

Three Trapped Tigers were a British instrumental experimental rock trio from London, England, composed of keyboardist and vocalist Tom Rogerson, drummer Adam Betts, and guitarist Matt Calvert. Formed in 2007, they released three EPs and two studio albums before they disbanded in 2024.

Besides periods of extensive touring, they have played at festivals such as ArcTanGent (2013, 2014, 2016, 2019, 2024), Portals (2019), Punkt (2017), and 2000Trees (2010, 2011, 2014).

== Members ==
- Tom Rogerson – piano, keyboards, vocals
- Adam Betts – drums, electronics
- Matt Calvert – guitar, synths, electronics

== Discography ==
=== Studio albums ===
- Route One or Die (Blood and Biscuits, 2011)
- Silent Earthling (Superball, 2016)

=== Compilations ===
- Numbers: 1-13 (2012)

=== Extended plays ===
- EP (2008)
- EP2 (2009)
- EP3 (2010)

=== Singles ===
- "7/1" (2009)
- "Noise Trade" (2011)
- "Reset" (2011)
