= Neil Cooper (drummer) =

British drummer

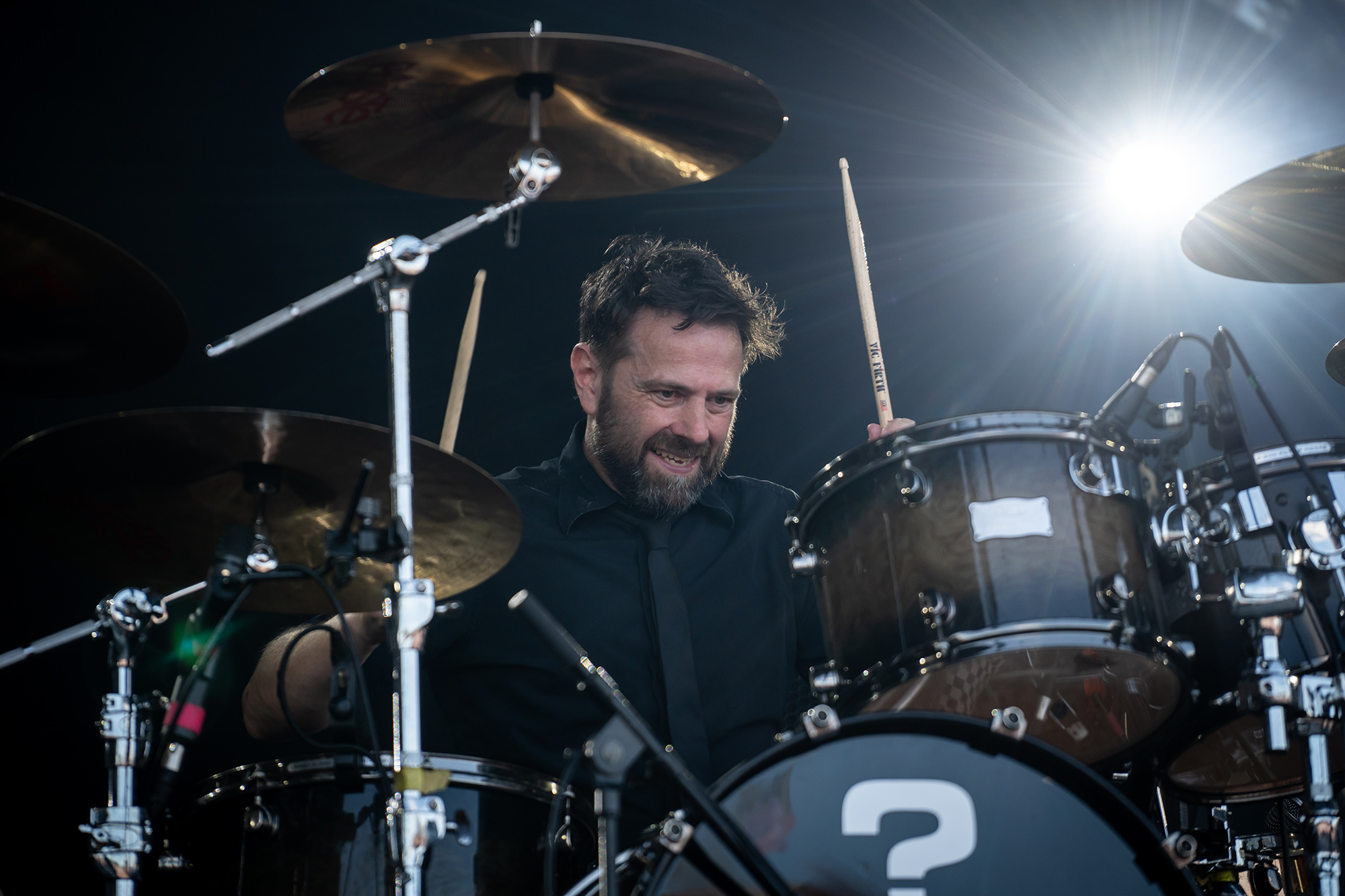
- Cooper performing with Therapy? in 2024

Background information
- Born: August 1, 1971 (age 54); Derby, England
- Genres: Alternative metal, alternative rock
- Occupation: Drummer
- Years active: 1988–present
- Member of: Therapy?
- Formerly of: The Beyond, Cable, Gorilla

Neil Cooper (born 1 August 1971) is an English drummer for Therapy?, a Northern Irish rock band, and formerly a member of The Beyond, a rock band.

== Career ==
Cooper was a founding member of The Beyond in 1988.

The Beyond disbanded in 1993, after which Cooper joined Cable. The band signed to Infectious Records and Cooper appeared on their debut album Downlift the Uptrodden. He also played on both of their John Peel sessions and toured the UK and Europe.

In 1995, however, Cooper re-joined his old bandmates from The Beyond in a new group called Gorilla. In 1998, following the release of several EPs, the group disbanded.

Cooper, operating freelance by the late 90's, had a stint with bigbeat combo Psychedeliasmith, and worked with Fatboy Slim. Cooper also gained his Certificate in Teaching from the Royal Schools of Music in 2001, the same year as he co-founded a Derby-based record label called Stressed Sumo Records.

Cooper joined Therapy? in 2002, following the departure of Graham Hopkins. His first live performance with Therapy? took place at the Carvicais Rock Festival in Portugal on 10 August that year. It followed one rehearsal in which he had to learn the full sixteen song set. Cooper has since played on the band's last eight studio albums – High Anxiety, Never Apologise Never Explain, One Cure Fits All, Crooked Timber, A Brief Crack of Light, Disquiet, Cleave, and Hard Cold Fire.

Cooper uses, and is endorsed by, Mapex drums, Paiste cymbals, and Vic Firth drumsticks.

== Discography ==
=== The Beyond ===
- Manic Sound Panic (1990 EP)
- No Excuse (1990 EP)
- Crawl (1991 album)
- "One Step Too Far" (1991 single)
- "Empire" (1991 single)
- Raging (1991 EP)
- Chasm (1993 album)

=== Cable ===
- "Sale of the Century" (1994 single)
- "Seventy" (1995 single)
- "Blindman" (1995 single)
- "Seventy" (1996 single)
- Downlift the Uptrodden (1996 album)

=== Gorilla ===
- Extended Play (1995 EP)
- Shutdown (1995 EP)
- "Who Wants to Save the World Anyway?" (1997 single)
- "Outside" (1998 single)

=== Therapy? ===
- All releases from 2003 to present
