= Michael McKeegan =

Northern Irish musician (born 1971)

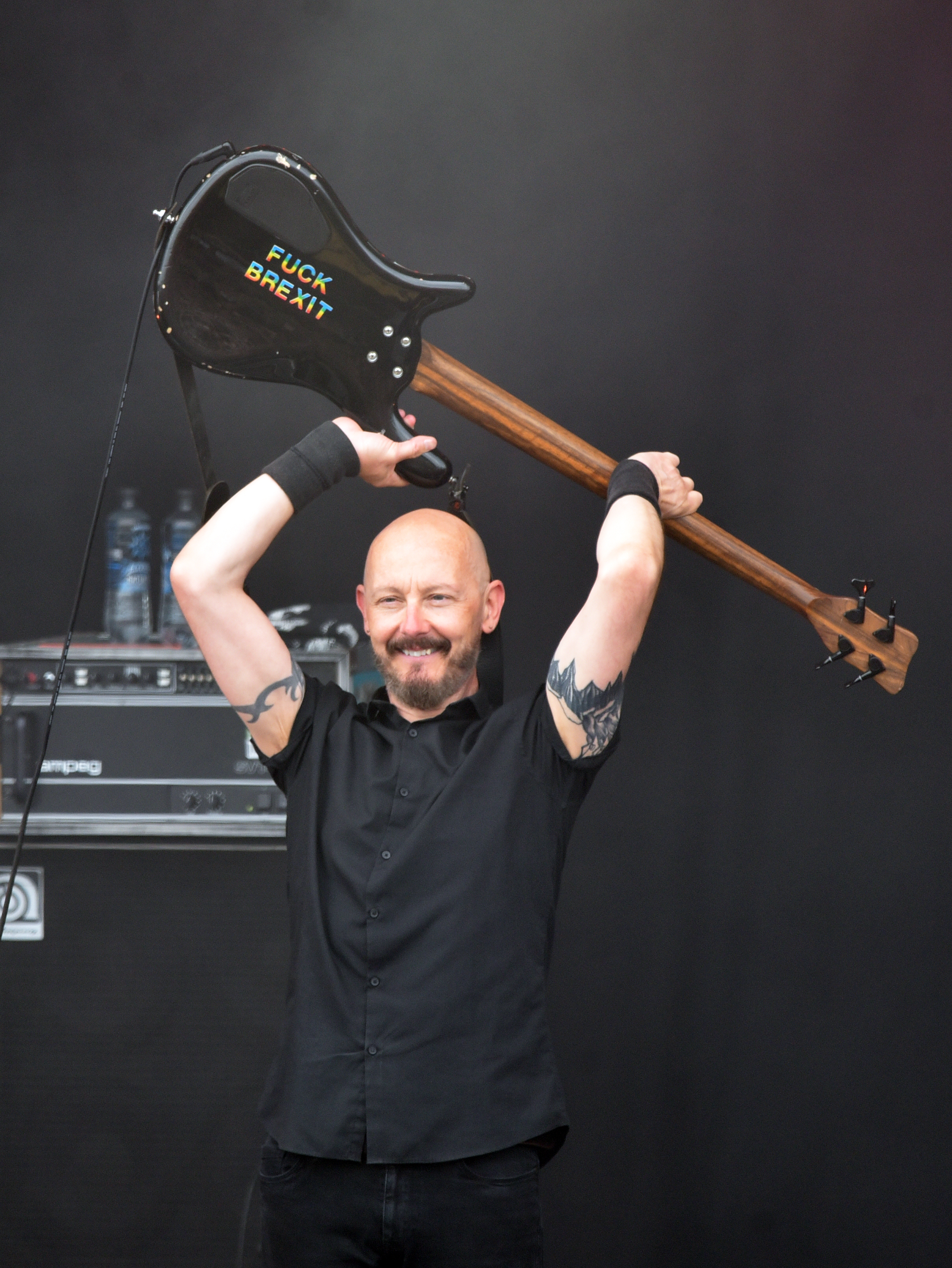
- McKeegan at Wacken Open Air 2022

Background information
- Born: 25 March 1971 (age 55); Larne, Northern Ireland
- Genres: Alternative metal Alternative rock
- Occupation: Musician
- Instrument: Bass guitar
- Years active: 1988–present
- Labels: Marshall Records, Black Tragick Records

Michael McKeegan (born 25 March 1971) is a Northern Irish musician best known as the bassist of rock band Therapy?.

== Evil Priest ==
In 1988, McKeegan (bass/vocals), along with his two brothers Ciaran (guitar) and Charlie (drums), formed a heavy metal band, Evil Priest. The group recorded two demo cassettes - "Pretention Is No Excuse" and "Hear No Evil...". The fledgling group disbanded in 1989 when Michael McKeegan joined Therapy?.

== Therapy? ==
In 1989, while McKeegan was still at school, his classmate Fyfe Ewing handed him a four song cassette that he had recorded with Andy Cairns, entitled "Thirty Seconds of Silence". McKeegan was so impressed he immediately joined as Therapy?'s bassist, and soon recorded his first material with the band; another four track demo tape entitled "Meat Abstract". He has since recorded sixteen studio albums, two compilation albums and numerous EPs. Along with Cairns, McKeegan is the only original member still with the band.

== Side projects ==
In the late 1990s, McKeegan joined the short-lived Belfast based group, Sons of Massey, along with his brother Charlie McKeegan (drums), Robyn G. Shiels (vocals/guitar) and Paul Kinghan (guitar). The group played live around Northern Ireland and recorded a demo at Einstein Studios in County Antrim.

In November 2014, McKeegan along with Andy Cairns recorded 15 tracks for a side project called East Antrim in Belfast's Start Studio with fellow Northern Irish musicians including Robyn G Shiels, Desert Hearts, Brian Coney, LaFaro and Goons. It's an electronic record, with a lot of spoken word and it deals in a very late night ambient sound. It remains unreleased.

In August 2015, McKeegan contributed bass to recordings of an original song "Purveyor of Quackery" and a cover of "Another Girl Another Planet" by The Only Ones. The group, consisting of fellow Therapy? members Andy Cairns and Neil Cooper, alongside 'Diamond' Dave Thompson on vocals and Rich Jones on lead guitar, was known as The Gemils. Backing vocals were contributed by Ricky Warwick, Tim Wheeler, Robyn G Shiels, Tom Dalgety and Stevie Firth. A 7" was produced and presented to Cairns as a 50th birthday gift. Just 10 copies were pressed and the single was not made public.

In 2017, McKeegan (bass and guitar) joined with ex-Throat/Dutch Schultz members Rory McGeown (vocals and guitar) and Willy Mundel (drums, vocals and guitar) to form Haunch. The groups' debut album "Lay My Bones Beside The Others" was released on 26 January 2018 via Black Tragick Records.

== Equipment ==
In the March 1998 issue of Guitar magazine, McKeegan stated:

"Chris Sheldon recommended I hired in this Music Man StingRay - then we wangled that the hire cost came off the price, so in the end I bought it for 500 quid which is a bargain. It's the best bass I've ever played. I got a new Mesa/Boogie head and a Mesa/Boogie cab as well, 2x15"s whereas I usually use an 8x10" - I needed something to really give a big bottom end 'cos on some tracks I tuned down to D or even C. I used a Boss Bass Overdrive too, but some of the more fuzzy bass is Mr Coloursound and his wonderful pedals again. Then I used the pitch-shift on a DigiTech Whammy pedal for some of the higher notes... oh, and I attacked the bass with the leg off Martin's cello. It's a very useful thing to have around".

In August 2003, he posted the following message on the official Therapy? website:

"For Troublegum and Infernal Love I used the black Status bass with an Ampeg Svt1 head and an Ampeg 8x10 cabinet. For Semi-Detached I used the Sunburst Musicman and a Mesa Boogie 4oo+ through a Mesa Boogie 2x15 cabinet. Suicide Pact was the Sunburst Musicman with the Mesa 400+ head through the Ampeg 8x10, Shameless was the Blue Musicman through a Mesa 400+ and a 2x15 Mesa cabinet. High Anxiety was the Blue Musicman with various weird heads through a Harke 4 x10 cabinet. In conjunction with all these set ups I normally use a Sans Amp bass driver pedal and Boss Bass Overdrive and Morley Bass wahs for the squally sounds… Hope you are confused. I am. For the record I NEVER had a Westone Thunder 1a. That is a reference to Andy's first ever bass guitar but I never dabbled. Aria Pro II when I could afford them! Other guitars… Status Buzzard, Fender Sunburst Precision and a Sunburst Fender Jazz have all made appearances on record and live".

== Personal life ==
Nicknamed 'The Evil Priest', McKeegan is known for his friendliness towards Therapy?'s fans - during gigs he often converses with members of the audience between songs, and regularly posts messages on the bands' official message boards. He lives in Belfast, with his Dutch wife whom he married in September 2008 and their two sons.

He appeared as a judge on BBC Northern Ireland's ATL Rock School 2007.

Since 2013, McKeegan has written a monthly column for the UK's Bass Guitar Magazine, where he also reviews bass guitars and amplifiers.

== Discography ==
=== Evil Priest ===
- Pretention Is No Excuse (1988) - demo tape
- Hear No Evil... (1988) - demo tape
- Hate Net (1989) - demo tape

=== Sons of Massey ===
- Sons of Massey (1999) - demo CD, unreleased

=== The Gemils ===
- Purveyor of Quackery (2015) - 7" limited to 10 copies, not for sale

=== Haunch ===
- Lay My Bones Beside the Others (2018)
- Let's Get the Surgery (2024)
