= Andy Cairns =

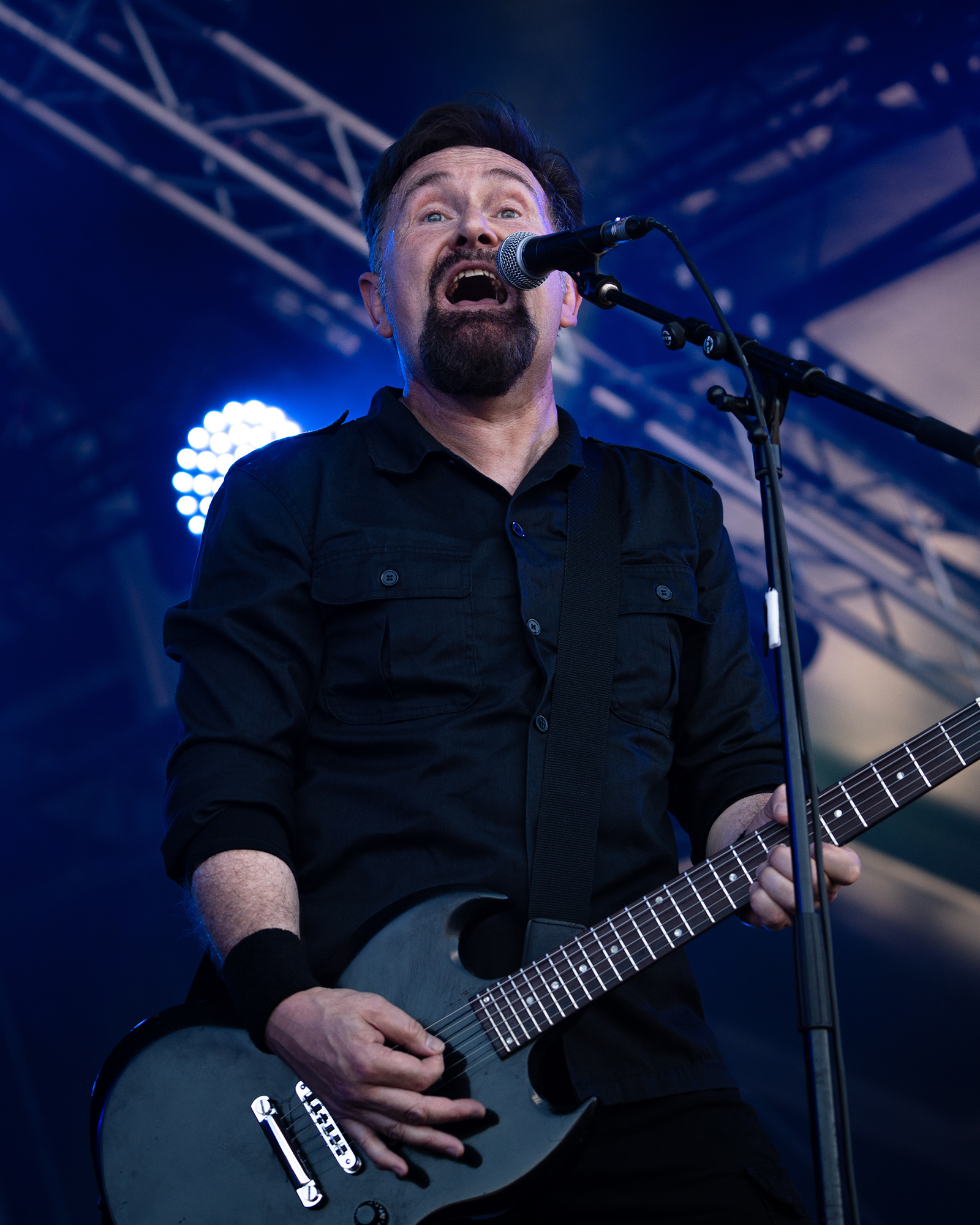
- Cairns in 2024

Background information
- Born: Andrew James Cairns; 22 September 1965 (age 61); Ballyclare, County Antrim, Northern Ireland
- Genres: Alternative metal Alternative rock
- Occupations: Singer-songwriter, musician
- Instruments: Vocals, guitar
- Years active: 1989–present
- Labels: Marshall Records, Blunt Records
- Member of: Therapy?
- Formerly of: Catweazle
- Website: www.therapyquestionmark.co.uk

Andrew James Cairns (born 22 September 1965), is a founding member, singer, guitarist, and songwriter for Therapy?, an alternative metal band from Northern Ireland.

== Therapy? ==
After attending Ballyclare High School in the town, Andy then began working as a quality control inspector in a Michelin tyre factory. After playing in local heavy metal and punk rock bands, Cairns started the band Therapy? in 1989 with drummer Fyfe Ewing whom he met at a local charity gig. Cairns quit his job and became a professional musician when Therapy? signed to London based independent label Wiiija. The band, completed by bassist Michael McKeegan, went on to widespread success, in particular with the much-lauded Troublegum album on A&M Records in 1994, which has sold over one million copies. To date he has recorded fifteen studio albums, two compilation albums and numerous EP's with the million selling outfit. Along with McKeegan, Cairns is the only original member still with the band.

Cairns' earliest work with Therapy? was characterised by an interest in psychiatry, psychosis and human isolation. Later Therapy? albums saw his lyrics become concerned with recurring themes such as doomed romance, loneliness and loss. He has a reputation amongst music fans for being a pleasant natured and approachable artist, happy to sign autographs or converse with fans. This "easy going" persona has marked him out as being quite different from fellow rock musicians, and has bolstered his enduring relationship with the music press.

== Side projects / solo ==
Prior to Therapy?, Cairns was a member of Likwidatorz (school punk band), Crash into June and Falling Eiffels. He has also played with roadie/radio presenter Diamond Dave Thompson in a band called The Buzzwreckers.

In 1990, while still unsure of Therapy?'s potential, Cairns formed another group called Catweazle. The trio, completed with Michael McKeegan's brother Charlie on drums and a bassist known only as Chappie, played live around Belfast and recorded a seven track rehearsal tape which has been circulated in trading circles. One of the tracks recorded, "This Isn't (Where It's At)", later re-appeared with different lyrics as "Jude The Obscene" from Therapy?'s 1995 album Infernal Love.

In 1993, Cairns co-founded Dublin-based record label, Blunt Records, with Dan Oggly of Friction PR. The label produced and released work for alternative Irish bands such as Mexican Pets and Pet Lamb. The label ceased operating in the late 1990s.

In 1995, Cairns (tremolo guitar and vocals) alongside Therapy? cellist/guitarist Martin McCarrick (cello, organ and vocals), formed a short-lived and highly experimental combo called Casey Jones Reaction. The duo demo'd a few tracks but nothing concrete arose from the sessions and nothing was officially released. However, in 2008 Andy posted several of the tracks on Therapy?'s official website. Two of the tracks, "Serge" and "Apple" featured Michael McKeegan on bass and were recorded in a studio. The remaining nine tracks were recorded on Martin's four-track.

In May 2013, Cairns embarked on his first ever solo acoustic tour of the UK, as well as some dates in Europe. To mark the tour, he released a CD of acoustic material for sale exclusively at the shows, titled 53 Minutes Under Byker, consisting of 12 Therapy? songs, 6 original tracks freshly written for the tour and a cover version, all recorded on 24 April 2013 in Newcastle's Blast Studios.

On 18 August 2014, Cairns recorded his second acoustic album, titled Fuck You Johnny Camo, which was sold on his UK tour in September 2014.

In November 2014, Cairns and McKeegan recorded 15 tracks for a side project called East Antrim in Belfast's Start Studio with fellow Northern Irish musicians including Robyn G Shiels, Desert Hearts, Brian Coney, LaFaro and Goons. It's an electronic record, with a lot of spoken word and it deals in a very late night ambient sound. It remains unreleased.

In August 2015, Cairns contributed guitar to recordings of an original song "Purveyor of Quackery" and a cover of "Another Girl Another Planet" by The Only Ones. The group, consisting of fellow Therapy? members Michael McKeegan and Neil Cooper, alongside 'Diamond' Dave Thompson on vocals and Rich Jones on lead guitar, was known as The Gemils. Backing vocals were contributed by Ricky Warwick, Tim Wheeler, Robyn G Shiels, Tom Dalgety and Stevie Firth. A 7" was produced and presented to Andy Cairns as a 50th birthday gift. Just 10 copies were pressed and the single was not made public.

In 2016, Cairns and Cooper recorded demo's under the banner of Widow Twankey with Cooper on drums, synthesiser and sampler, and Cairns "ranting". Much like the East Antrim project, the band has loose plans to release it in the future.

== Discography ==
=== Solo ===
- 53 Minutes Under Byker (2013) – an acoustic solo CD sold exclusively at gigs
- Fuck You Johnny Camo (2014) – second acoustic solo CD sold exclusively at gigs

=== The Gemils ===
- Purveyor of Quackery (2015) – 7" limited to 10 copies, not for sale

=== Guest appearances ===
Title	Released	Where	Notes
Jonestown Mind	1994	"Crank" album by The Almighty, "Jonestown Mind" single by The Almighty	The Almighty & Andy Cairns (backing vocals)
Rehab	2000	"Untied States" album by Manchild, "Rehab" single by Manchild	Manchild & Andy Cairns (vocals & guitar)
Waiting For Earthquakes	2001	"Psycho-Narco" album by The Almighty	The Almighty & Andy Cairns (backing vocals)
Radio	N/A (Recorded in 2001 at Blackwing Studios, London)	"Rock N' Fuckin' Roll" compilation by Dog Toffee, unreleased	Dog Toffee & Andy Cairns (backing vocals)
Gleason	2002	"Knievel Is Evil" album by Throat	Throat & Andy Cairns (guitar)
Get Your Groove On	2003	"The Wildhearts Must Be Destroyed" album by The Wildhearts	The Wildhearts & Andy Cairns (vocals)
F8	2005	"No End in Sight" album by This Is Menace	This Is Menace & Andy Cairns (vocals)
F8 (live)	2007	"Emotion Sickness" DVD by This Is Menace	This Is Menace & Andy Cairns (vocals)
The Second Triumvarate of Lavonia	2009	"Pompa Magna" album by Inferno	Inferno & Andy Cairns (vocals). Andys' lyrics are mainly recycled from "Stop It You're Killing Me"
Crisis? What Crisis?	2014	"Strategy Two" 7" single by Thirty Six Strategies	Thirty Six Strategies & Andy Cairns (backing vocals). 7" included download code
Ignite	2014	"Strategy Two" 7" single by Thirty Six Strategies	Thirty Six Strategies & Andy Cairns (guitar). Originally by The Damned. 7" included download code
Celebrity Sinking	2014	"When Patsy Cline Was Crazy" album by Ricky Warwick	Ricky Warwick & Andy Cairns (backing vocals & co-writer)
