= Indie rock =

Genre of rock music

- Stylistic origins: Punk rock; DIY; jangle pop; post-punk; Dunedin sound
- Cultural origins: Early to mid-1980s, United Kingdom, United States and New Zealand
- Derivative forms: Chillwave; Britpop; chamber pop; grunge; post-Britpop; post-rock; SoundCloud indie

Subgenres
- Grebo; blog rock; landfill indie; math rock; Midwest emo; noise pop; post-punk revival; slacker rock; slowcore; shoegaze

Fusion genres
- Alternative dance (baggy); alternative R&B; grindie; indie folk; new rave; indie surf

Regional scenes
- Australia; Belgium; California; Netherlands; Nevada; Thames Valley; Yorkshire

Local scenes
- Birmingham; Dunedin; Hamburg; Leeds; Manchester; Sheffield

Other topics
- Indie pop; DIY ethic; alternative rock; lo-fi; noise rock; power pop; glam rock

Indie rock is a subgenre of rock music that originated in the United Kingdom, United States and New Zealand in the early to mid-1980s. Although the term was originally used to describe rock music released through independent record labels, by the 1990s it became more widely associated with the music such bands produced.

The sound of indie rock has its origins in the UK DIY music of the Buzzcocks, Desperate Bicycles and Television Personalities and the New Zealand Dunedin sound of the Chills, Tall Dwarfs, the Clean and the Verlaines, alongside Australia's the Go-Betweens and early 1980s college rock radio stations who would frequently play jangle pop bands like the Smiths and R.E.M. The genre solidified itself during the mid–1980s with NME's C86 cassette in the United Kingdom and the underground success of Sonic Youth, Dinosaur Jr. and Unrest in the United States. During the 1990s, indie rock bands like Sonic Youth, the Pixies and Radiohead all released albums on major labels and subgenres like slowcore, Midwest emo, slacker rock and space rock began. By this time, "indie" had evolved to refer to bands whose music was released on independent record labels, in addition to the record labels themselves. As the decade progressed many individual local scenes developed their own distinct takes on the genre: baggy in Manchester; grebo in Stourbridge and Leicester; and shoegaze in London and the Thames Valley.

During the 1990s, the mainstream success of grunge and Britpop, two movements influenced by indie rock, brought increased attention to the genre and saw record labels use their independent status as a marketing tactic. This led to a split within indie rock: one side conforming to mainstream radio; the other becoming increasingly experimental. By this point, "indie rock" referred to the musical style rather than ties to the independent music scene. In the 2000s, indie rock reentered the mainstream through the garage rock and post-punk revival and the influence of the Strokes, the White Stripes and the Libertines. This success was exacerbated in the middle of the decade by Bloc Party, Arctic Monkeys and the Killers, while indie rock further proliferated into the 2000s blog rock era and the British landfill indie movement, as well as the indie sleaze aesthetic.

== Etymology and characteristics ==
Lately we've been hearing the tag "'90s indie rock" used to describe bands ranging from Waxahatchee to Speedy Ortiz to Yuck, and while our brain immediately turns a switch that associates the phrase with "sounds like Pavement", '90s indie rock was really as eclectic and undefinable as, well, contemporary indie rock.

— Philip Cosores of Complex Networks (September 18, 2013)

The terms "independent record label" or "independent music" were originally used in the 1930s to 1950s for American artists associated with jazz, rhythm and blues and early rock and roll, who were predominantly Black musicians initially sidelined by major labels, therefore relied on independent distribution to release their work.

By the early 1980s, the earliest known use of the term "indie rock" was made in an article of Billboard magazine, titled "Despite Hard Times, Indie Rock Labels Survive" on 15 January 1983 by writer Roman Kozak, in which he used a short-hand for the term "independent rock", to describe a growing trend of successful independent record labels in New York that primarily focused on the emerging alternative rock music scene. Indie rock originally described a style of alternative rock that was associated with small and relatively low-budget independent labels a do-it-yourself attitude. Drawing influences from punk, psychedelia and post-punk. Although record deals were later often struck with major corporate companies, "indie rock" became more closely associated with a specific style of rock music rather than its mode of distribution.

Indie, in the beginning, was simply short for "independent" – the term was first applied to a bunch of British bands operating through independent record labels in the 1980s, most notably The Smiths. But indie-coded bands quickly became very, very popular. Defining indie as something commercially niche then made little sense, especially in the 2000s, when indie bands competed with rappers and pop stars for the top chart positions. So what are we left with? A songwriting sensibility that's a little weirder than down-the-line rock. Guitar work that often (but not always) tends towards the sharp and angular. A lot of blazers about too, but indie bands like to break rules.

— Lucy Ford, Daisy Jones and Josiah Gogarty of GQ Magazine (February 12, 2025)

AllMusic identifies indie rock as including a number of "varying musical approaches [not] compatible with mainstream tastes". Linked by an ethos more than a musical approach, the indie rock movement encompassed a wide range of styles, from hard-edged, grunge-influenced bands, through do-it-yourself experimental bands like Pavement, to punk-folk singers such as Ani DiFranco. In his book DIY Style: Fashion, Music and Global Digital Cultures, Brent Luvaas described the genre as rooted in nostalgia, citing the influence of garage rock and psychedelic rock of the 1960s in progenitors the Stone Roses and the Smiths, in addition to a lyrical preoccupation with literature.

In this same vein, Matthew Bannister defined indie rock as "small groups of white men playing guitars, influenced by punks and 1960s white pop/rock, within a broader discourse and practice of (degrees of) independence from mainstream musical values." According to anthropologist Wendy Fonarow, a key element of indie is the dichotomy between a "puritan ethos" and a "romantic one", with the former using austere ethics, and the latter being eccentric. This is best seen in the contrast between the indie music of United States and the United Kingdom in the 1990s, with British acts being flamboyant performers, while American acts used their lack of virtuosity as a mark of authenticity.

Indie rock is noted for having a relatively high proportion of female artists compared with preceding rock genres, a tendency exemplified by the development of the feminist-informed riot grrrl music of acts like Bikini Kill, Bratmobile, 7 Year Bitch, Team Dresch and Huggy Bear. However, Cortney Harding pointed out that this sense of equality is not reflected in the number of women running indie labels.

== Influences ==
=== 1960s–1970s ===
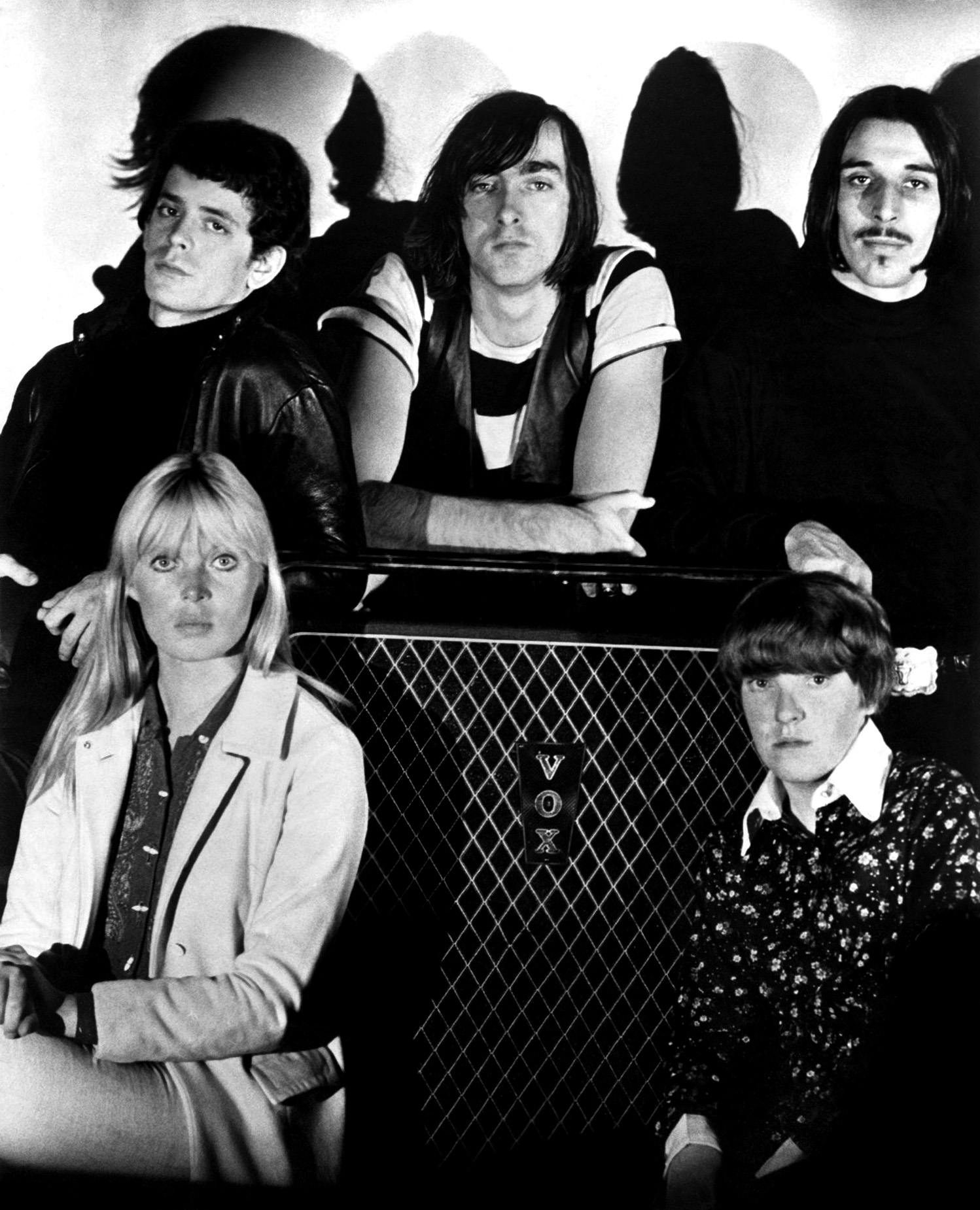
The Velvet Underground was an influential experimental rock act during the late 1960s.

The Velvet Underground and the Kinks have been cited as early musical influences on indie rock, with David Lowery of the band Cracker stating: "The Kinks were like the first indie rock band, in a weird way". Furthermore, Pitchfork cited the Beach Boys, as well as the Byrds as pivotal influences, noting that "without the Byrds, the entirety of college rock—and, from it, indie rock—wouldn't exist". Other influences include Syd Barrett of Pink Floyd and Alex Chilton's Big Star, with the Guardian noting that Barrett's "influence became built into the music we now know as indie rock", and describing Big Star as the "ur-band" for "emotionally acute indie-rock". Alongside, ex-Roxy Music member, Brian Eno's debut and sophomore albums.

In New York's CBGB scene, Patti Smith became the first punk artist to self-release a single with her 1974 cover of "Hey Joe", featuring "Piss Factory" as the B-side. This was later followed by Television's "Little Johnny Jewel" in October 1975, their melodic guitar interplay on Marquee Moon proved influential to the early indie scene. Pere Ubu also self-released their debut single in December 1975. Other influences included proto-punk artists the Stooges and the Modern Lovers.

=== Late 1970s ===
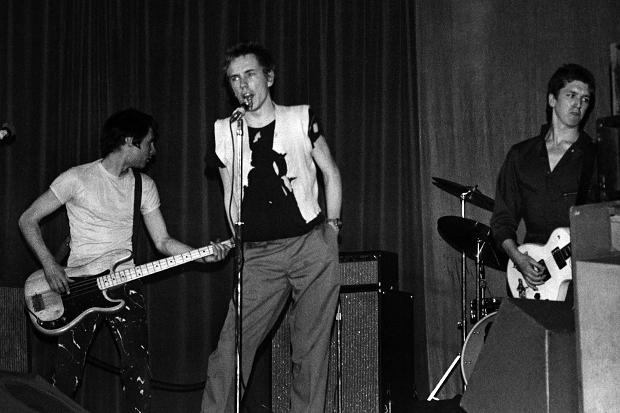
Sex Pistols at Manchester's Lesser Free Trade Hall on 4 June and 20 July 1976 inspired the formation of Joy Division, the Fall, the Smiths, Simply Red, Magazine, Buzzcocks, Factory and Creation Records

During the advent of punk rock in the late 1970s, bands began to embrace and popularize a DIY ethic that encouraged anyone, regardless of skill or musical background, to form a band. On June 4 and July 20, 1976, the Sex Pistols, performed at the Lesser Free Trade Hall in Manchester, which inspired the formation of influential groups like the Smiths, Buzzcocks, the Fall and Joy Division as well as the launch of influential independent record labels such as Factory and Creation Records, as Tony Wilson and Alan McGee cited the performance as inspiring their interest in British alternative music.

Furthermore, independent record labels became integral to the early years of punk rock musical distribution, as seen with Beserkley Records in the US, who put out the debut album of The Modern Lovers which was recorded years earlier. In the UK, indie label Stiff Records released the first UK punk single "New Rose" by the Damned. In Australia, Brisbane band the Saints had their first punk release outside the US, "(I'm) Stranded", on their own "Fatal Records" label. This was followed by the Go-Betweens releasing "Lee Remick" a few months later.

By the late 1970s, the post-punk scene emerged in the UK, encapsulating bands that while retaining the DIY ethos of punk, began to push its boundaries. Artists such as the Cure, the Monochrome Set, Felt, the Raincoats and Young Marble Giants who were mostly signed to independent labels like Rough Trade, Factory Records and Cherry Red, served as a foundational influence on indie rock and later alternative music. Additionally, art punk band Wire influenced later acts such as Guided by Voices and Hüsker Dü. Likewise, the Soft Boys, became cult favorites in the US where bands like R.E.M. and the Replacements "memorized every lick".

Scottish post-punk bands, Orange Juice, Josef K and later the Vaselines also proved to be influential.

American groups like the Feelies, Mission of Burma, Talking Heads and the Embarrassment—the latter an influence on R.E.M. were also important to the development of indie rock.

== Background ==
Before punk rock and the independent music boom of the late 1970s to early 1980s, independent music already had a rich history of promoting developments in popular music, particularly in genres overlooked by major labels. Prior to the late 1970s, major record companies held so much power that independent labels struggled to establish themselves, as they often failed commercially or were eventually absorbed by major labels. However, this dynamic began to change in 1979 when Rough Trade released the album Inflammable Material by Stiff Little Fingers which went on to be the first independently-released album to sell over 100,000 copies and enter the UK Top 20. This success sparked major record companies' interest in independent music and by the end of the decade, the establishment of the UK indie charts signaled the growing popularity of the movement. The BBC documentary "Do it Yourself: The Story of Rough Trade" stated that:

"[...] when Rough Trade began in 1976 there were about a dozen independent labels in Britain, by the end of the decade there were over 800."

Other notable early indie labels include Mute, 4AD, Factory, Beggars Banquet and Creation Records.

=== Early UK DIY movement ===
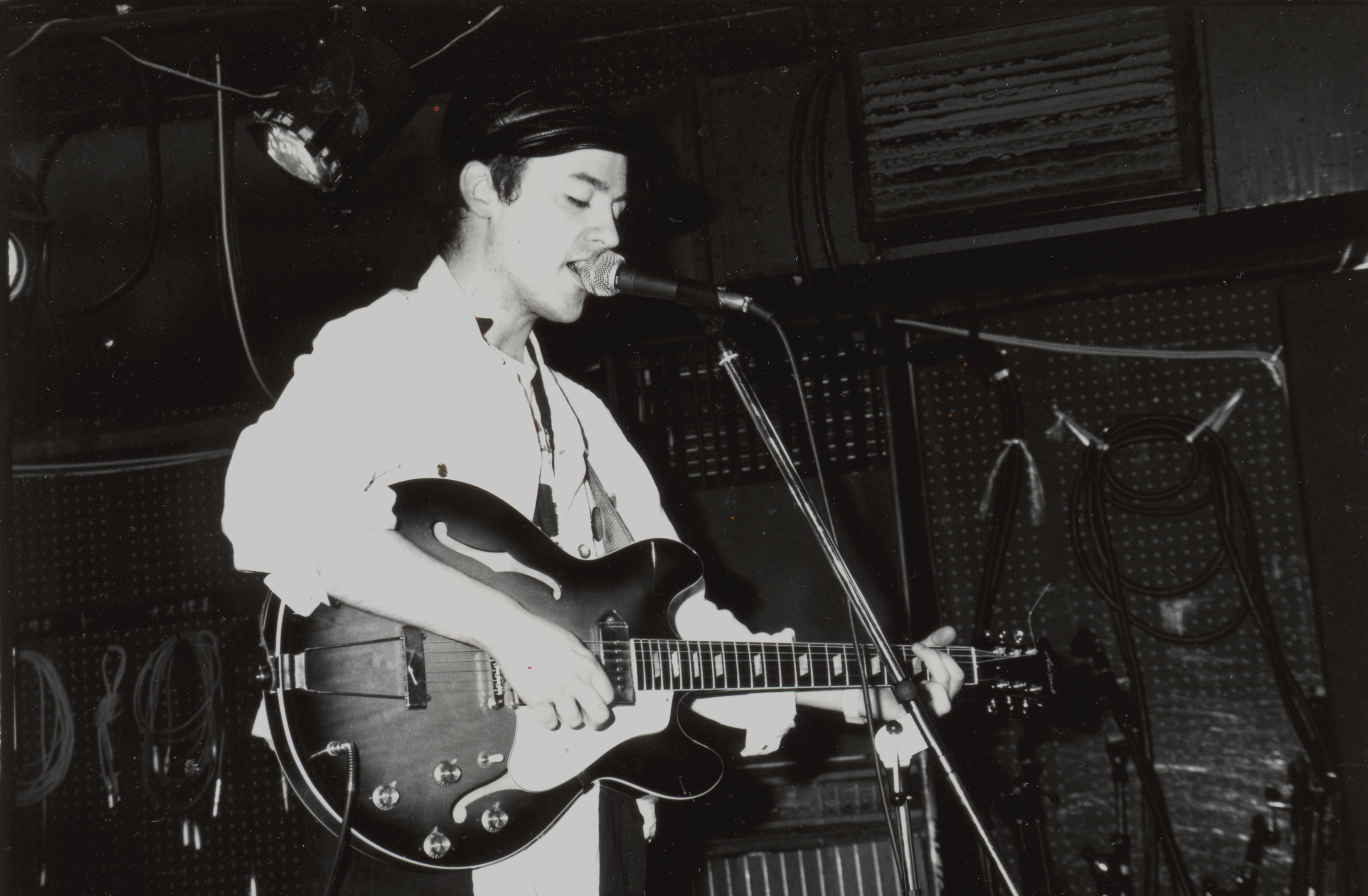
Dan Treacy's Television Personalities, one of the leading bands of the UK DIY wave and forerunners to indie pop

The BBC documentary Music for Misfits: The Story of Indie remarks that the self-publication of the Spiral Scratch EP by Manchester punk rock band the Buzzcocks, on their independent record label New Hormones on 29 January 1977, was a pivotal moment in the development of indie rock, as well as the wider English independent music scene. Writer Kevin Dunn's Global Punk highlights how the Buzzcocks' debut EP inspired a wave of independent DIY releases across the United Kingdom: "...the EP literally showed how one could make a record, with the details of the recording process (e.g., number of takes and over-dubs) and pressing costs printed right on the record cover."

Similarly, the earliest releases by the Desperate Bicycles showed listeners how to produce and distribute their own records independently at very low cost, with the sole objective of undermining the monopoly that major record labels held over the wider music industry. Both the Buzzcocks and Desperate Bicycles helped inspire a wave of DIY punk bands like 'O' Level, Television Personalities, Swell Maps, and others—who followed suit in producing and distributing their own records. Distribution was further improved with the establishment of 'The Cartel', an association of companies like Red Rhino and Rough Trade Records who would take the releases from these small labels and get them into record shops nationwide. Stephen Malkmus later cited the British DIY era as a foundational influence on Pavement.

=== Dunedin sound ===
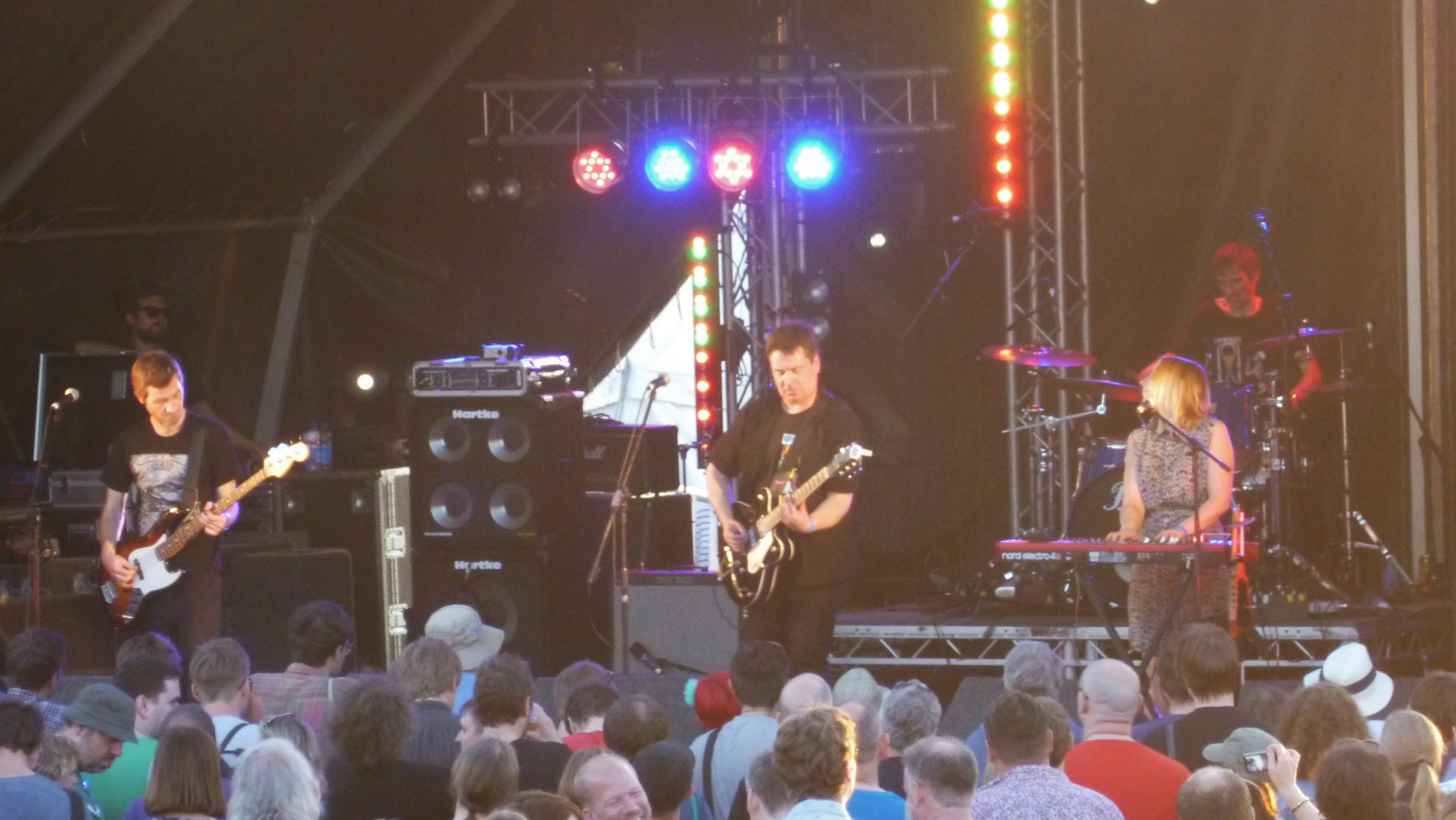
The Chills performing at Indietracks in rural Derbyshire in 2014

The city of Dunedin, New Zealand, produced many of the bands that formed the cornerstone of the independent record label Flying Nun Records. These artists defined the Dunedin sound, which would be particularly influential on the development of indie rock's sound. According to Audioculture, one of the earliest Dunedin Sound band was Chris Knox's band the Enemy, which emerged as a post-punk group, whose members also included Alec Bathgate. Although the group was only around for a short time, their shows impressed the teenage musicians that came to see them, including a young Shayne Carter, who went on to form Bored Games, the DoubleHappys and Straitjacket Fits. Knox later formed another short-lived punk band called Toy Love, and after it broke up, he went on to start the influential band Tall Dwarfs, who were an integral influence on the emergence of home-recorded lo-fi indie. The punk-inspired aspects of the scene were often inspired by opposition to Robert Muldoon and his government, which prompted satire or outright criticism. The scene saw bands take influence from punk rock, but strip away its aggression for a reverb heavy, pop–influenced sound. Marked by the Clean's 1981 debut single "Tally-Ho!" and 1982's Dunedin Double EP featuring the Chills, Sneaky Feelings, the Verlaines and the Stones, its guitars were often jangly and droning and vocals indistinct. The following years, the Dunedin sound spread to other New Zealand cities such as Christchurch or Auckland.

== History ==
=== Origins ===
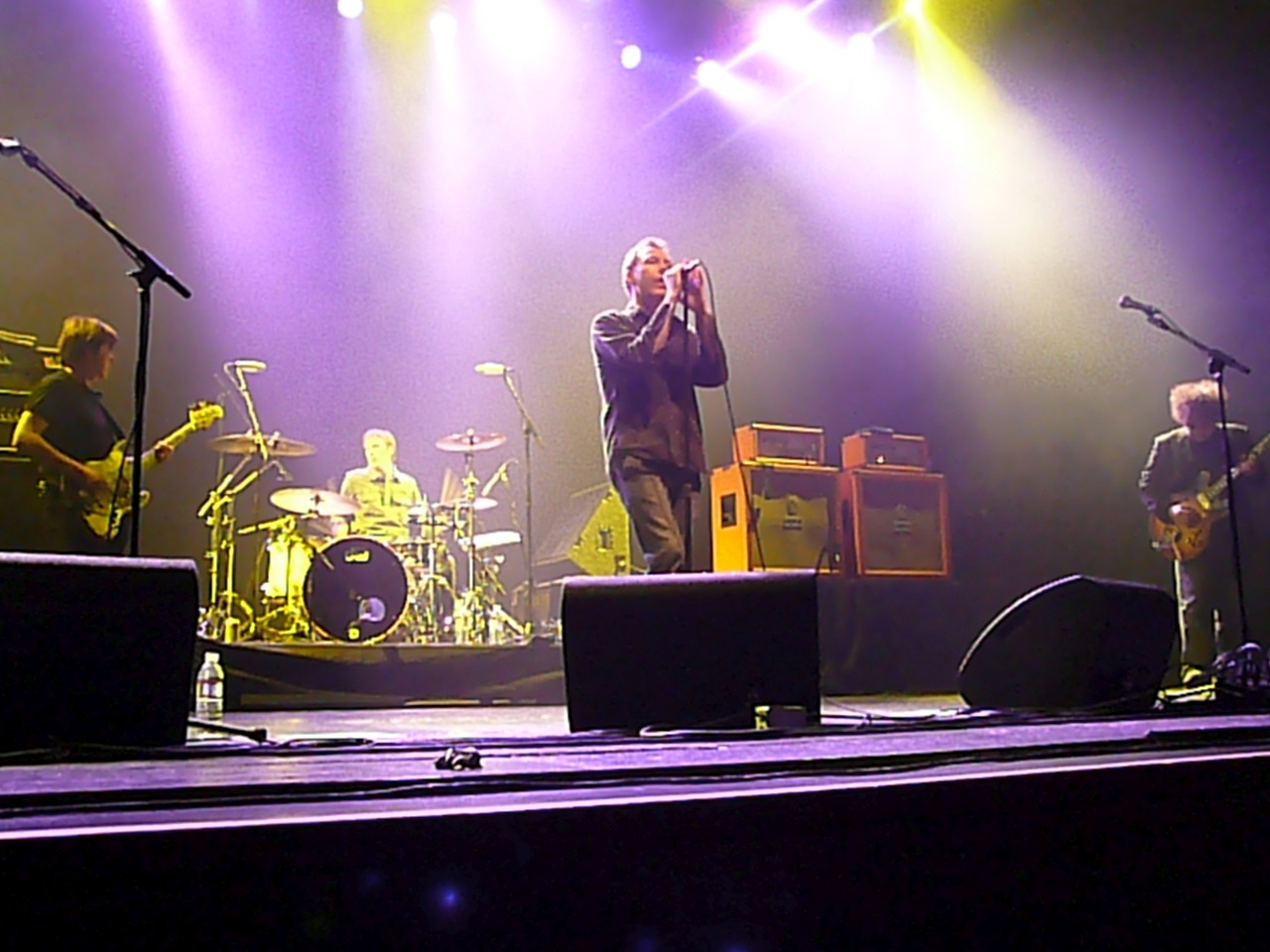
British band the Jesus and Mary Chain performing in California in 2007

The early to mid–1980s saw the growing popularity of college radio stations, primarily in the United States, who would play independent artists of various genres, including alternative rock, new wave, post-hardcore and post-punk. The bands broadcast on these stations became dubbed "college rock" by fans, another term which lacked any stylistic implication. The most prominent college rock bands were jangle pop groups R.E.M., from the US, and the Smiths, from the UK, who Matthew Bannister states were the earliest indie rock groups. These bands' influence was quickly seen in the formation of Let's Active, the Housemartins and the La's. By this time, the term "indie rock" had begun to be used to describe the bands who produced music on independent record labels, rather than simply the record labels themselves. This made it the only genre at the time which was defined by the methods by which the music was distributed rather than the sound of said music.

Journalist Steve Taylor also cited the bands involved in the Paisley Underground scene as early indie groups. In the following years the Jesus and Mary Chain and Flying Nun Records bands like the Jean-Paul Sartre Experience morphed the genre into a slower, darker and more hypnotic style. The number of college radio stations in the US decreased significantly following NPR's lobbying against noncommercial station during the 1980s. In turn, the name "college rock" fell into disfavour, soon being replaced by "indie".

=== Development ===
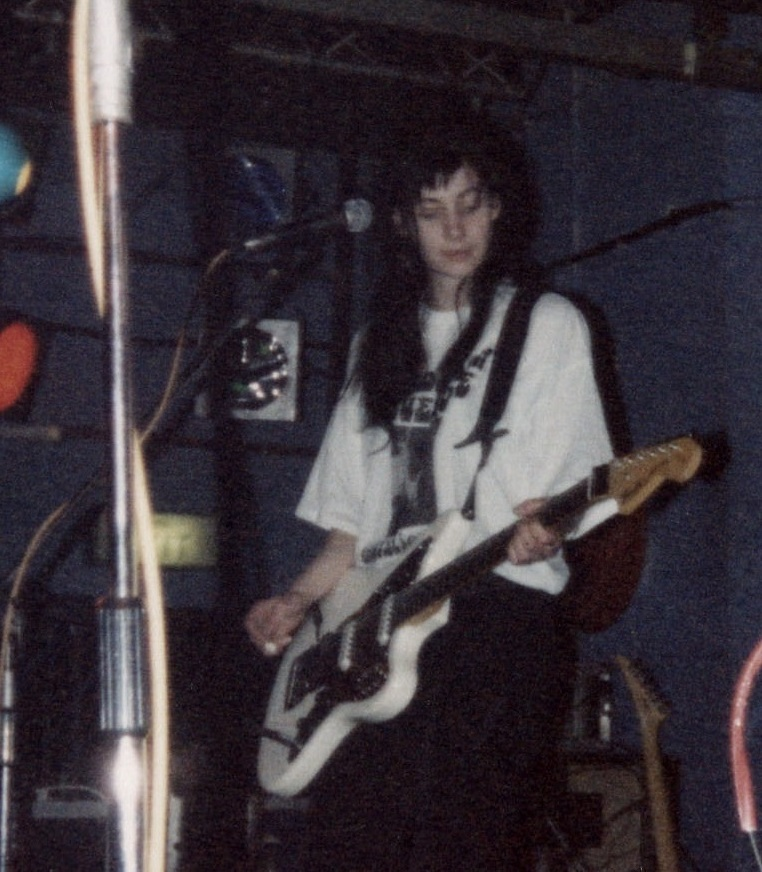
My Bloody Valentine pioneered the indie rock subgenre shoegaze.

In the United Kingdom, NME released the C86 compilation cassette, which consisted of tracks by groups including Primal Scream, the Pastels and the Wedding Present. Intended to showcase the UK's current independent music scene, the album was made up of groups combining elements of jangle pop, post-punk and Phil Spector indebted Walls of Sound. In 2006, Bob Stanley called it "the beginning of indie music". C86 became a descriptor in its own right, describing not only the bands on the tape but also bands who it influenced, often used alongside terms like "anorak pop" and "shambling". Some C86 bands found significant commercial success: the Soup Dragons went on to sell out Madison Square Garden; Primal Scream were critically acclaimed, receiving the first ever Mercury Prize in 1992; the Wedding Present charted eighteen times in the Top 40; however many bands in its twenty-two track runtime also fell into obscurity.

In the United States, the popularity of R.E.M. allowed those disliking of hardcore punk's aggression and militancy to become a part of the underground music scene. This empowered an array of musicians, particularly those in what would become the post-hardcore scene as led by the Minutemen who in the hardcore scene were often met with hostility, with Pitchfork citing "the first time they opened for Black Flag, the Minutemen were showered with spit from the crowd", further stating that "they just weren't that hardcore". Despite this, they've been credited with providing "the life blood of indie rock for decades". Similarly, Wipers, who with their melodic riffs and emphasis on guitar leads and solos, also stood out in the hardcore scene, influencing emerging indie artists such as J Mascis of Dinosaur Jr, helping re-introduce guitar virtuosity back into alternative music.

Furthermore, major labels began to pursue underground bands, with both Hüsker Dü and the Replacements releasing albums on majors in the middle of the decade. While these albums did not see the same success as R.E.M., and major labels soon lost interest in the scene, they did have a large impact on younger bands. Some groups like Camper Van Beethoven, the Dead Milkmen and Violent Femmes infused the scene with sardonic humor and irony. In the following years, Sonic Youth, Dinosaur Jr. and Unrest began to release music on independent labels indebted to these bands, and soon too picked up the categorisation of indie rock. As the 1980s closed, both Sonic Youth and the Pixies signed to major labels.

In the late 1980s, the indie rock subgenre shoegaze emerged, as a continuation of the wall of sound production being used by groups like the Jesus and Mary Chain. The genre merged this with influences from Dinosaur Jr. and the Cocteau Twins, to create a dark and droning style so cacophonous that instruments were often indistinguishable. The genre was pioneered by My Bloody Valentine on their early EPs and debut album Isn't Anything. The band's style influenced a wave of bands in London and the Thames Valley area including Chapterhouse, Moose and Lush. This scene was collectively termed "the Scene That Celebrates Itself" by Melody Maker's Steve Sutherland in 1990.

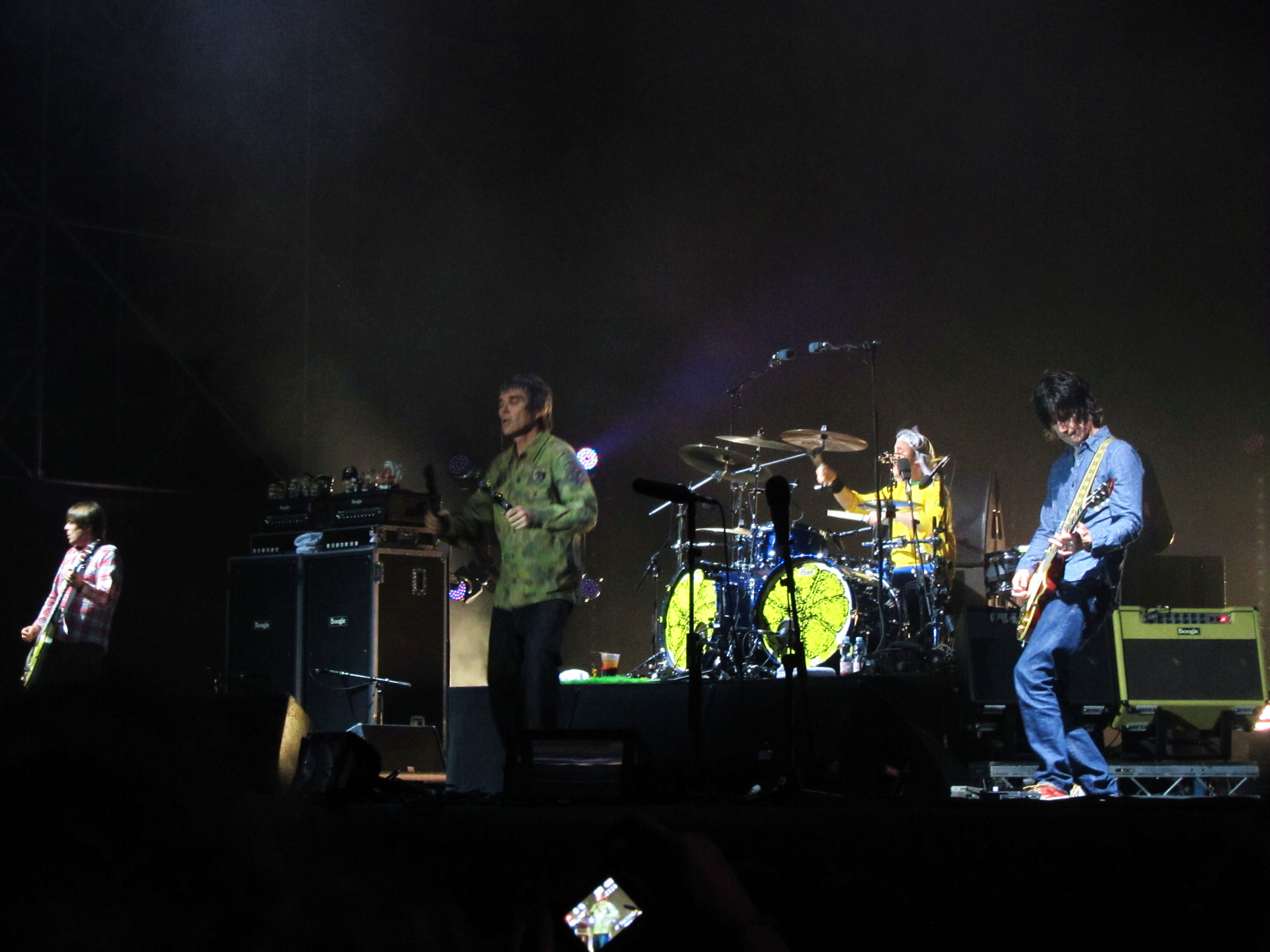
The Stone Roses' 1990 Spike Island concert was the highest attendance performance by an independent artist of its time.

Madchester was another style and scene that originated in the late 1980s. Defined by its merger of C86 indie rock, dance music and Hedonist rave culture, particularly its emphasis on the use of psychedelic drugs, the scene was centred in Manchester. The scene was based around the Haçienda nightclub, which opened in May 1982 as an initiative of Factory Records. For the first few years of its life, the club played predominantly club-oriented pop music and hosted performances by artists including New Order, Cabaret Voltaire, Culture Club, Thompson Twins and the Smiths. The Madchester movement burgeoned by 1989, with the success of the Happy Mondays second album Bummed and the Stone Roses' self-titled debut, which became the most influential work in the scene. In the following years, addition high profile acts included the Charlatans, 808 State and the Inspiral Carpets.

The Madchester scene's distinct combination of indie rock and dance music became termed indie dance by critics, or more specifically the subgenre baggy. Madchester and baggy's most infamous moment was the 27 May 1990 Spike Island concert headlined by the Stone Roses. With an attendance of around 28,000 and lasting twelve hours, it was the first event of its size and kind to be hosted by an independent act.

In Stourbridge, a scene of indie bands who took influence from electronic, punk, folk and hip-hop music emerged, dubbed grebo by critics. Fronted by Pop Will Eat Itself, the Wonder Stuff and Ned's Atomic Dustbin, "grebo" was broadly defined, and was used more as a name for the Stourbridge scene than as a genre label. However, the bands quickly gained attention: Pop Will Eat Itself's 1989 singles "Wise Up! Sucker" and "Can U Dig It?" both entered the UK Top 40 and Stourbridge briefly became a tourist attraction for young indie rock fans. The seminal albums from the scene were released between 1989 and 1993: the Wonder Stuff's Hup and Never Loved Elvis; Ned's Atomic Dustbin's God Fodder and Are You Normal?; and Pop Will Eat Itself's This Is the Day...This Is the Hour...This Is This! and The Looks or the Lifestyle?. In this period, the scene's bands became fixtures, sometimes headliners, at Reading Festival, sold millions of albums and were frequently featured on the covers of magazines like NME and Melody Maker. Grebo bands were distinct from prior indie rock groups not only because of their broad influences, but their subversion of the twee or unhappy moods of most other bands in the genre, and their pursuit of a heavier sound and aesthetic. The scene came to include the stylistically similar bands of nearby Leicester: the Bomb Party, Gaye Bykers on Acid, Crazyhead, the Hunters Club and Scum Pups.

=== Mainstream–underground split: 1990s ===
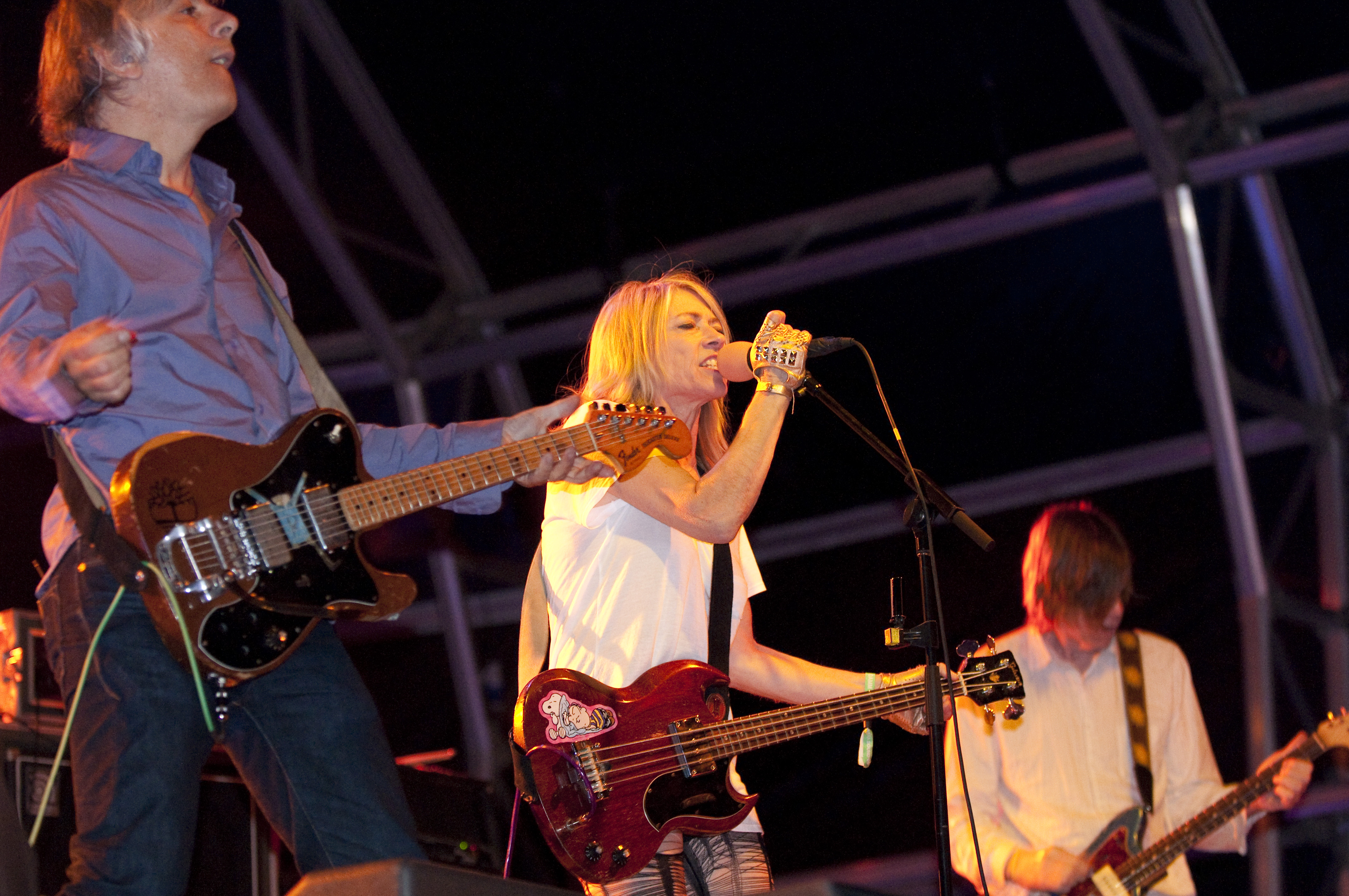
The success of grunge allowed Sonic Youth to break through into the mainstream.

In the early 1990s, the Seattle grunge scene, and its most visible acts, Nirvana, Pearl Jam, Soundgarden and Alice in Chains, broke into the mainstream. The monumental success of these bands, particularly Nirvana, brought increased attention to the indie rock scene, which initiated a shift in which the indie rock descriptor became displaced by the term alternative rock. As a result, the term "alternative" lost its original counter-cultural meaning and began to refer to the new, commercially lighter form of music that was now achieving mainstream success. New York magazine writer Carl Swanson argued that even the term "sellout" lost its meaning as grunge made it possible for a niche movement, no matter how radical, to be co-opted by the mainstream, cementing the formation of an individualist, fragmented culture.

In his book Popular Music: The Key Concepts, media academic Roy Shuker states that "Grunge represented the mainstreaming of the North American indie rock ethic and style of the 1980s", going on to explain that a band's status as independent became "As much a marketing device as [indie rock and alternative rock were an] identifiable 'sound'". In the wake of this increased attention, indie rock experienced a split: accessible bands who catered to the now-popular alternative rock radio; and bands who continued to experiment, advancing in the underground. According to AllMusic, it was during this split that "indie rock" solidified itself as a term for the style of music played by these underground artists, while the mainstream indie rock-influenced bands became termed alternative rock.

Slowcore developed in the United States as a direct counterpoint to the rapid growth of grunge. Although loosely defined, slowcore generally includes slow tempos, minimalist instrumentals and sad lyrics. Galaxie 500, particularly their second album On Fire (1989), were heavy influences on the genre, with Bandcamp Daily writer Robert Rubsam, calling them the "fountainhead for all that would come". The first wave of bands in the genre included Red House Painters, Codeine, Bedhead, Ida and Low. The genre originated from around the United States, with no geographic focus, and very little interaction between its artists.

A younger subset of grebo bands emerged around 1991, who were in turn labelled "fraggle" bands. During this movement, the dominant sound was a style of indie rock that was heavily indebted to punk and Nirvana's album Bleach album, while also occasionally making use of drum machines. Gigwise writer Steven Kline described the style as "filthy guitars, filthier hair and t-shirts only a mother would wash". Prominent fraggle acts included Senseless Things, Mega City Four and Carter the Unstoppable Sex Machine.

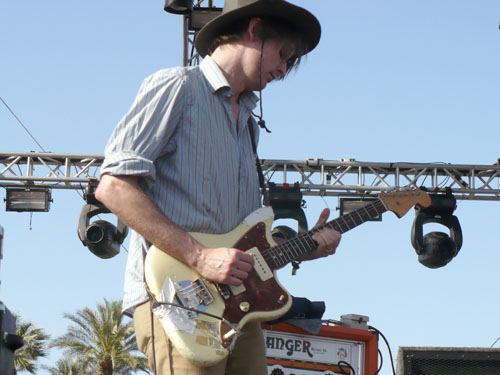
Pavement singer/guitarist Stephen Malkmus

Spin writer Charles Aaron described Pavement and Guided by Voices as "the two bands that came to exemplify indie rock in this period, and still define the term in many people's minds". Both bands made use of a lo-fi production style which romanticised their D.I.Y. ethos. Pavement's 1992 album Slanted and Enchanted, was one of the defining albums of the slacker rock subgenre. Rolling Stone called the album "the quintessential indie rock album", placing it on the magazine's list of the 500 greatest albums of all time.

In the North Carolina Research Triangle, an indie rock scene was being spearheaded by groups enfranched Merge Records like Superchunk, Archers of Loaf and Polvo. describing a growing scene of indie-rock bands who were influenced by hardcore punk and post-punk. At the time, publications such as Entertainment Weekly took to calling the college town of Chapel Hill the "next Seattle". Superchunk's single "Slack Motherfucker" has also been credited by Columbia magazine with popularizing the "slacker" stereotype, and as a defining anthem of 90s indie rock.

With the rise of Britpop, many of Britain's earlier indie rock bands fell into obscurity. Fronted by Blur, Oasis, Pulp and Suede, the bands in the movement were advertised as being underground artists, as a means to compete commercially with the United States' grunge scene. While Britpop was stylistically indebted to indie rock and began as an offshoot of it, Britpop bands abandoned the genre's earlier anti-establishment politics and instead brought it into the mainstream, with bands like Blur and Pulp even signing to major labels. In her essay Labouring the Point? The Politics of Britain in "New Britain", politician and academic Rupa Huq states that Britpop "began as an offshoot of the independent British music scene but arguably ended up killing it, as a convergence took place between indie and mainstream, removing the distinctive 'protest' element of British-based independent music" Music journalist John Harris has suggested that Britpop began when Blur's fourth single "Popscene" and Suede's debut "The Drowners" were released around the same time in the spring of 1992. He stated, "[I]f Britpop started anywhere, it was the deluge of acclaim that greeted Suede's first records: all of them audacious, successful and very, very British." Suede were the first of the new crop of guitar-orientated bands to be embraced by the UK music media as Britain's answer to Seattle's grunge sound. Their debut album Suede, released on 29 March 1993, became the fastest-selling debut album in British music history at the time.

==== Diversification ====
Sunny Day Real Estate's debut album, Diary (1994), began a new wave of the emo genre, by incorporating elements of it into their indie rock sound. Sunny Day Real Estate and other second wave emo bands, including Piebald, the Promise Ring and Cap'n Jazz distanced emo from its hardcore roots and allowed the genre to develop a much more realised scene than its first wave. This style of emo broke into mainstream culture in the early 2000s, with the platinum-selling success of Jimmy Eat World's Bleed American (2001) and Dashboard Confessional's The Places You Have Come to Fear the Most (2001). One particularly notable scene during this wave was the Midwest emo bands of the latter half of the decade, who incorporated the jangly guitar tones of earlier indie rock and elements of math rock to create the distinctive style of groups like American Football. The popularity of emo, also allowed a number of "not-quite-indie-not-quite-emo" bands like Death Cab For Cutie, Modest Mouse and Karate to gain significant attention.

The loosely defined Elephant 6 collective – which included the Apples in Stereo, Beulah, Circulatory System, Elf Power, the Minders, Neutral Milk Hotel, of Montreal and the Olivia Tremor Control – merged indie rock with psychedelic pop. Gimme Indie Rock author Andrew Earles stated that the collective, namely Neutral Milk Hotel on On Avery Island (1996), "helped keep the genre artistically relevant while other bands defected and other underground styles rose to prominence".

Indie electronic or indietronica covers rock-based artists who share an affinity for electronic music, using samplers, synthesizers, drum machines, and computer programs. Less a style and more a categorization, it describes an early 1990s trend of acts who followed in the traditions of early electronic music (composers of the BBC Radiophonic Workshop), krautrock and synth-pop. Progenitors of the genre were English bands Disco Inferno, Stereolab, and Space. Most musicians in the genre can be found on independent labels like Warp, Morr Music, Sub Pop or Ghostly International.

Space rock took the psychedelic rock, ambient music influence of Pink Floyd and Hawkwind and incorporated them into an indie rock context. The style began with Spacemen 3 in the 1980s, with later groups including Spiritualized, Flying Saucer Attack, Godspeed You! Black Emperor and Quickspace.

As Britpop waned towards the end of the decade, post-Britpop took hold within the UK's indie rock scene. From about 1997, as dissatisfaction grew with the concept of Cool Britannia and Britpop as a movement began to dissolve, emerging bands began to avoid the Britpop label while still producing music derived from it. After the decline of Britpop they began to gain more critical and popular attention. The Verve's album Urban Hymns (1997) was a worldwide hit and their commercial peak before they broke up in 1999, while Radiohead – although having achieved moderate recognition with The Bends in 1995 – achieved near-universal critical acclaim with their experimental third album OK Computer (1997), and its follow-ups Kid A (2000) and Amnesiac (2001). Stereophonics, used elements of a post-grunge and hardcore on their breakthrough albums Word Gets Around (1997) and Performance and Cocktails (1999), before moving into more melodic territory with Just Enough Education to Perform (2001) and subsequent albums. Feeder, who were initially more influenced by American post-grunge, producing a hard rock sound that led to their breakthrough single "Buck Rogers" and the album Echo Park (2001). After the death of their drummer Jon Lee, they moved to a more reflective and introspective mode on Comfort in Sound (2002), their most commercially successful album to that point, which spawned a series of hit singles. The most commercially successful band in the millennium were Coldplay, whose first two albums Parachutes (2000) and A Rush of Blood to the Head (2002) went multi-platinum, establishing them as one of the most popular acts in the world by the time of their third album X&Y (2005). Snow Patrol's "Chasing Cars" (from their 2006 album Eyes Open) is the most widely played song of the 21st century on UK radio.

=== Mainstream success: 2000s ===
==== Post-punk and garage rock revival ====
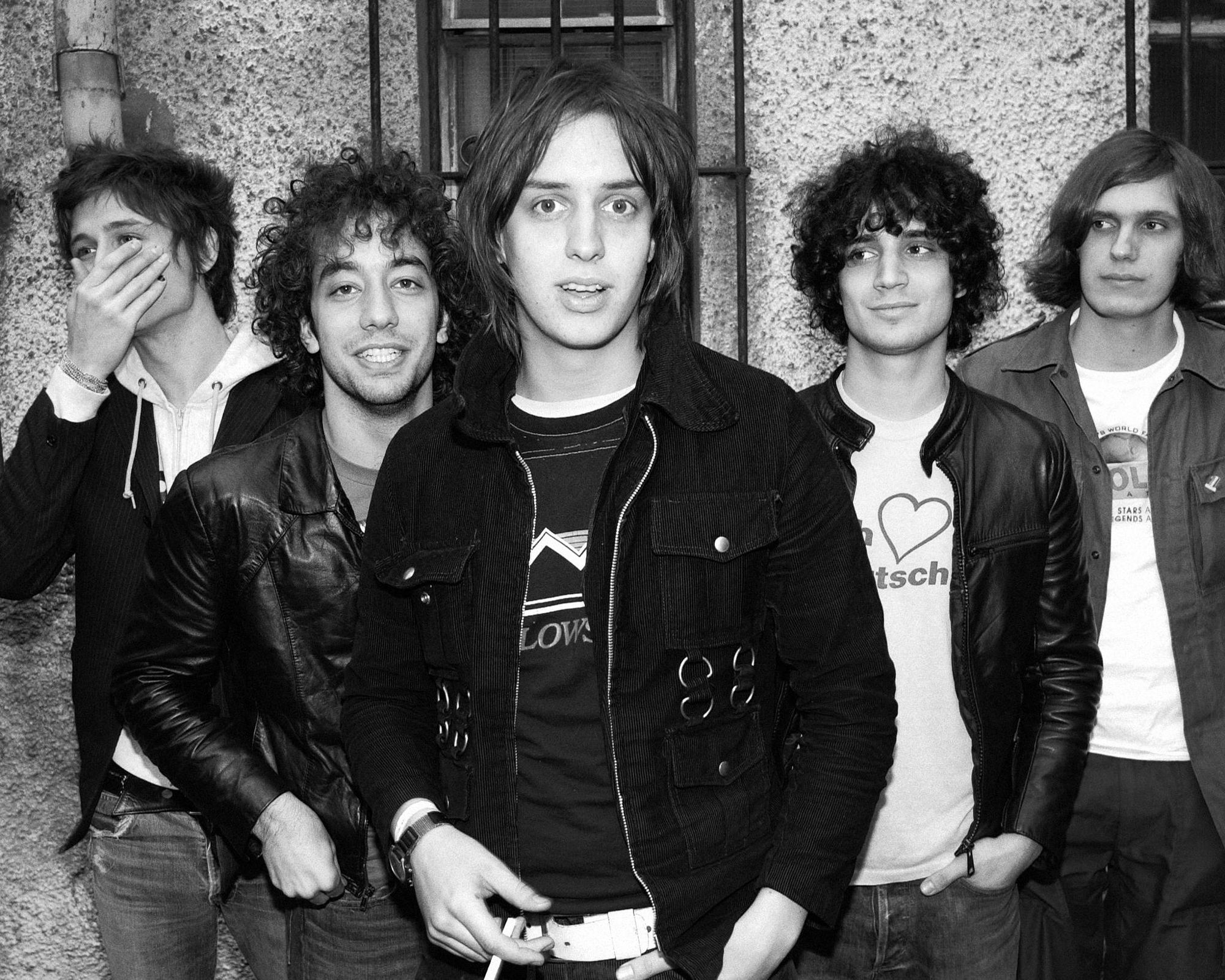
The Strokes are one of the most influential bands to indie rock in the 2000s.

The mainstream attention which indie rock garnered in the 2000s began with the Strokes and their 2001 debut album Is This It. Playing a style indebted to '60s-70s bands like the Velvet Underground and the Ramones, the band's intention musically was to sound like "a band from the past that took a time trip into the future to make their record." The album peaked at number thirty-three in the United States, staying in the charts for two additional years and debuted at number two on the UK albums chart. When the Strokes made their commercial debut, the public perception of "rock music" was based in post-grunge, nu metal and rap rock, putting their throwback style of garage rock as a stark contrast to the mainstream. The band's immediate influence allowed fellow classic rock influenced New York bands like the Yeah Yeah Yeahs, Interpol and TV on the Radio to gain mainstream attention. The Strokes were accompanied in this commercial breakthrough by the White Stripes, the Vines, and the Hives. These groups were christened by parts of the media as the "The" bands, and dubbed "the saviours of rock 'n' roll", prompting Rolling Stone magazine to declare on its September 2002 cover, "Rock is Back!"

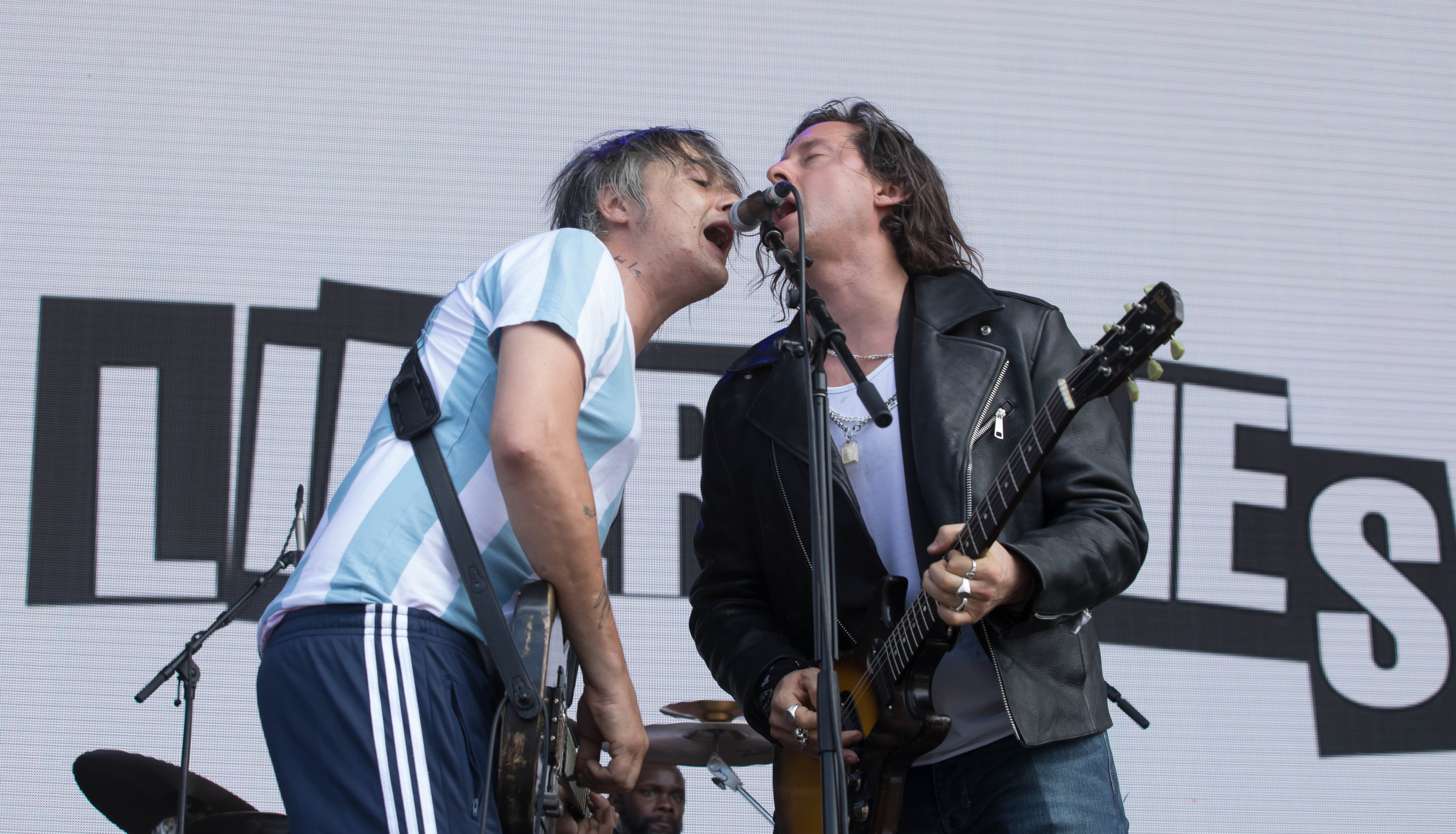
The Libertines were described by AllMusic as "one of the U.K.'s most influential 21st century acts".

The success of the Strokes revitalised the then-dying underground post-Britpop scene in the United Kingdom with groups who took the band's influence and experimented with their sound. This first wave of UK acts included Franz Ferdinand, Kasabian, Maxïmo Park, the Cribs, Bloc Party, Kaiser Chiefs and the Others. However, the Libertines, who formed in 1997, stood as the UK's counterpoint to the Strokes, being described by AllMusic as "one of the U.K.'s most influential 21st century acts" and The Independent stating that "the Libertines wanted to be an important band, but they could not have predicted the impact they would have". Influenced by the Clash, the Kinks, the Smiths and the Jam, the band's style of tinny, high register, sometimes acoustic, guitar parts topped by lyrics of British parochial pleasures in the vocalists' authentic English accents became widely imitated. The Fratellis, the Kooks, and the View were three such acts to gain significant commercial success, although the most prominent post-Libertines band was Sheffield's Arctic Monkeys. One of the earliest groups to owe their initial commercial success to the use of Internet social networking, the Arctic Monkeys had two No. 1 singles, and their album Whatever People Say I Am, That's What I'm Not (2006) became the fastest-selling debut album in British chart history.

In this success, legacy indie bands soon entered the mainstream, including Modest Mouse (whose 2004 album Good News for People Who Love Bad News reached the US top 40 and was nominated for a Grammy Award), Bright Eyes (who in 2004 had two singles at the top of the Billboard magazine Hot 100 Single Sales) and Death Cab for Cutie (whose 2005 album Plans debuted at number four in the US, remaining on the Billboard charts for nearly one year and achieving platinum status and a Grammy nomination). This new commercial breakthrough and the widespread use of the term indie to other forms of popular culture, led a number of commentators to suggest that indie rock had ceased to be a meaningful term.

Additionally, a second wave of bands emerged in the United States that managed to gain international recognition as a result of the movement included the Black Keys, Kings of Leon, the Shins, the Bravery, Spoon, the Hold Steady, and the National. The most commercially successful band of this wave was Las Vegas' the Killers. Formed in 2001, after hearing Is This It, the band scrapped the majority of their prior material to rewrite it under the Strokes' influence. The band's debut single "Mr. Brightside" spent 260 non-consecutive weeks, or five years, on the UK Singles Chart as of April 2021, the most out of any song, and As of 2017, it had charted on the UK Singles Chart in 11 of the last 13 years, including a 35-week run peaking at number 49 in 2016–2017. Furthermore, it was the UK's most streamed pre-2010 song, until it was surpassed in late 2018, and continued to be purchased for download hundreds of times a week by 2017. In March 2018, the song reached the milestone of staying in the Top 100 of the UK Singles Chart for 200 weeks.

==== Landfill indie ====
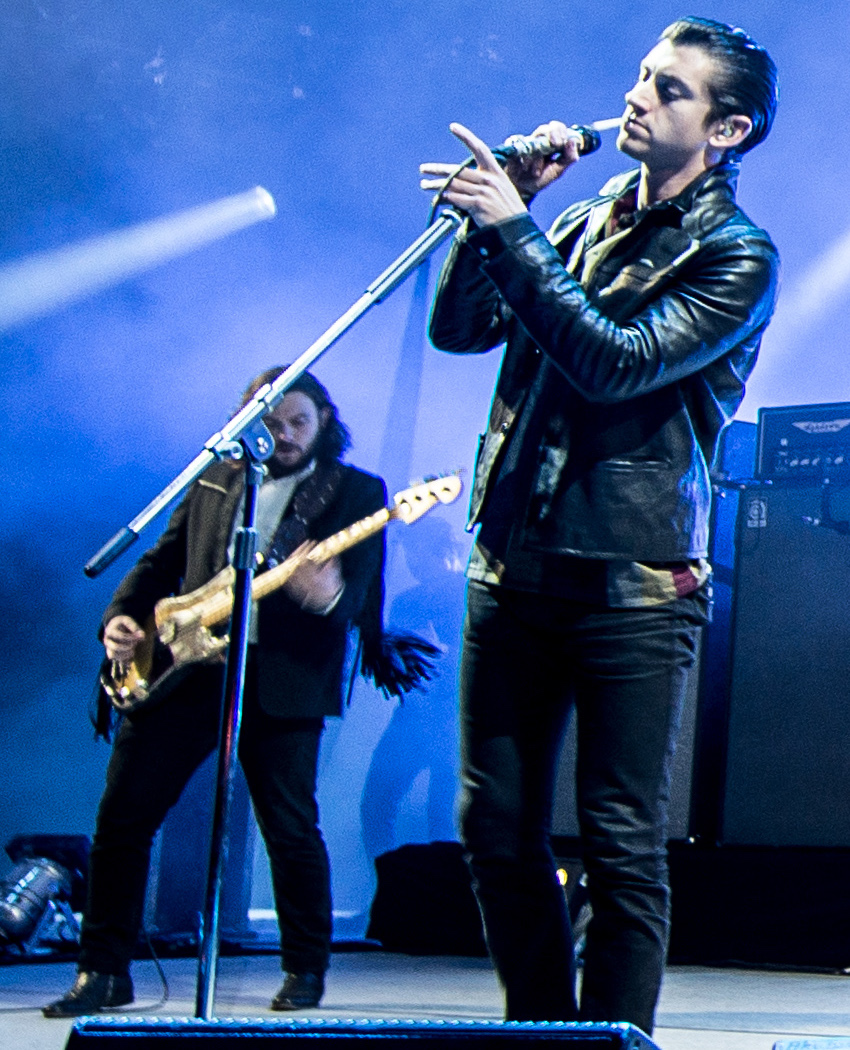
Arctic Monkeys are one of the most commercially successful bands to emerge out of the landfill indie movement.

The impact of the Strokes, the Libertines and Bloc Party led to significant major label interest in indie rock artists, which was then exacerbated by the success of the Arctic Monkeys. In the years following Whatever People Say I Am, That's What I'm Not there was a proliferation of bands such as the Rifles, the Pigeon Detectives and Milburn, who created a more formulaic derivative of the earlier acts. By the end of the decade, critics had taken to referring to this wave of acts as "landfill indie", a description coined by Andrew Harrison of the Word magazine. A 2020 Vice article cited Johnny Borrell, vocalist of Razorlight, as the "one man who defined, embodied and lived Landfill Indie" due to his forming of a "spectacularly middle-of-the-road" band despite his close proximity to the Libertines' "desperate kinetic energy, mythologised love-hate dynamic and vision of a dilapidated Britain animated by romance and narcotics". In a 2009 article for the Guardian, journalist Peter Robinson cited the landfill indie movement as dead, blaming the Wombats, Scouting For Girls, and Joe Lean & the Jing Jang Jong by stating "If landfill indie had been a game of Buckaroo, those three sent the whole donkey's arse of radio-friendly mainstream guitar band monotony flying high into the air, legs flailing."

=== Continued success: 2010s–present ===
There continued to be commercial successes in the 2010s Arcade Fire's The Suburbs (2010), the Black Keys's Turn Blue (2014), Kings of Leon's Walls (2016), the Killers's Wonderful Wonderful (2017), which reached number one on the Billboard charts in the United States and the official chart in the United Kingdom, with Arcade Fire's album winning a Grammy for Album of The Year in 2011. Other indie rock acts like Florence and the Machine, the Decemberists and LCD Soundsystem gained number one singles in the United States during the decade, with Vampire Weekend, Florence and the Machine, Arctic Monkeys, Bon Iver, the Killers and the Postal Service gaining platinum selling records. Vampire Weekend's third studio album Modern Vampires of the City (2013) received the Grammy Award for Best Alternative Music Album in 2014, with Consequence writer Tyler Clark stating that in 2019 it was still "an indie rock standard bearer in the wider world of music". Arctic Monkeys' fifth album AM (2013) was one of the biggest indie rock albums of the decade, charting at number one on the UK Albums Chart, having sold 157,329 copies, thus becoming the second fastest-selling album of the year. With the debut of AM on the chart, Arctic Monkeys also broke a record, becoming the first independent-label band to debut at number one in the UK with their first five albums. As of June 2019, AM has spent 300 weeks in the top 100 of the UK Albums Chart. The album also peaked at number one in Australia, Belgium (Flanders), Croatia, Slovenia, Denmark, Ireland, the Netherlands, New Zealand, and Portugal, and reached top ten positions in several other countries. In the United States, the album sold 42,000 copies in its first week, and debuted at number six on the Billboard 200 chart, becoming the band's highest-charting album in the United States. In August 2017, AM was certified platinum by the RIAA for combined sales and album-equivalent units over of a million units in the United States. As of the 14th of April 2023 every track from the album was certified silver or higher by the BPI with "Mad Sounds" being the last to be certified.

When the 1975's merger of indie rock and mainstream pop began gaining commercial attraction in the early 2010s, it was controversial; they received the award for "Worst Band" at the 2014 NME Awards, but by 2017 received "Best Live Band" at the same award show. Alternative Press writer Yasmine Summan stated that "If you could summarize 2013 and 2014 in one album for indie and alternative fans, it would be the 1975's self-titled release". In an article for the Guardian accrediting the 1975 as the band to "usher indie into the mainstream", writer Mark Beaumont compared vocalist Matty Healy's influence on the genre to that of Libertines vocalist Pete Doherty, and Pitchfork listed them as one of the most influential artists in music since 1995. In the 1975's wake, a number of other indie pop artists gained popularity. Some critics termed this phenomenon "Healywave", which notably included: Pale Waves, the Aces, Joan, Fickle Friends and No Rome. Of this group, Pale Waves were particularly commercially prominent, with their debut album My Mind Makes Noises peaking at number eight on the UK albums chart, Who Am I? (2021) at number three and Unwanted (2022) at number four. At around the same time Wolf Alice became a prominent force in the scene, with their second album Visions of a Life (2017) winning the Mercury Prize in 2018 and third album Blue Weekend (2021) being nominated. Writer Martin Young stated in a 2021 article for Dork that "It's impossible to truly state just how important Wolf Alice are. They are the catalyst for almost all the amazing bands you've read about in Dork over the last 5 years."

== See also ==
- Independent music
- Indie music scene
- List of indie rock musicians

== Sources ==
- Rogers, Ian (2008). "'You've got to go to gigs to get gigs': Indie musicians, eclecticism and the Brisbane scene". Continuum. 22 (5): 639–649. doi:10.1080/10304310802311618. S2CID 144566463.
