= Now for a Feast! =

Compilation album by Pop Will Eat Itself
- Released: December 1988
- Recorded: 1986–87
- Genre: Alternative rock, grebo
- Label: Chapter 22

Pop Will Eat Itself chronology
Box Frenzy (1987)	Now for a Feast! (1988)	This Is the Day...This Is the Hour...This Is This! (1989)

Professional ratings
Review scores
Source	Rating
Allmusic	3/5 stars

Now for a Feast! is a compilation album by English rock band Pop Will Eat Itself, released in November 1988 by Chapter 22 Records. It compiles their work before 1988, and has been re-released several times by different labels, each with a different selection of bonus tracks. The Cherry Red version, released as a 25th anniversary edition, contained almost every song released by the band while Graham Crabb was drumming, as well as several unreleased demos and versions, one live song, and three very rare demos recorded by Wild And Wandering, the previous incarnation of the band before their name was changed to Pop Will Eat Itself in 1986. The album is largely devoid of the grebo and electronic influences of later albums.

== Track listing ==
=== Chapter 22/Rough Trade Editions ===
All tracks are written by Vestan Pance, except where otherwise noted.

No.	Title	Writer(s)	Length
1.	"The Black Country Chainstore Massacre"		1:43
2.	"Monogamy"		1:40
3.	"Oh Grebo, I Think I Love You"		1:53
4.	"Titanic Clown"		1:24
5.	"B-B-B-Breakdown"		1:37
6.	"Sweet Sweet Pie"		2:12
7.	"Like An Angel"	Dave Newton, Tony Linehan	2:31
8.	"I'm Sniffin With You Hoo"		0:53
9.	"Sick Little Girl"		2:29
10.	"Mesmerized"		1:27
11.	"Theresapsychopathin My Soup"		1:05
12.	"Candydiosis"		1:00
13.	"The Devil Inside"		1:46
14.	"Orgone Accumulator"	Dave Brock, Robert Calvert	1:58

=== Other editions ===
All tracks are written by Vestan Pance, except where otherwise noted.

No.	Title	Writer(s)	Sources & Credits	Length
1.	"I'm Sniffin With You Hoo"		From The Poppies Say GRRrrr! EP, 1986.	0:53
2.	"Sick Little Girl"		From The Poppies Say GRRrrr! EP, 1986.	2:29
3.	"Mesmerized"		From The Poppies Say GRRrrr! EP, 1986.	1:27
4.	"Theresapsychopathin My Soup"		From The Poppies Say GRRrrr! EP, 1986.	1:05
5.	"Candydiosis"		From The Poppies Say GRRrrr! EP, 1986.	1:02
6.	"The Black Country Chainstore Massacre"		From Poppiecock EP, 1986.	1:45
7.	"Monogamy"		From Poppiecock EP, 1986.	1:42
8.	"Oh Grebo, I Think I Love You"		From Poppiecock EP, 1986.	1:55
9.	"Titanic Clown"		From Poppiecock EP, 1986.	1:26
10.	"B-B-B-Breakdown"		From Poppiecock EP, 1986.	1:39
11.	"Sweet Sweet Pie"		From Sweet Sweet Pie single, 1987.	2:13
12.	"The Devil Inside"		From Sweet Sweet Pie single, 1987.	1:48
13.	"Runaround"		From Sweet Sweet Pie single, 1987.	2:07
14.	"Love Missile F1-11" (only on Castle and Cherry Red versions)	Martin Degville, Tony James, Neal Whitmore	From Love Missile F1-11 single, 1987.	2:48
15.	"Orgone Accumulator" (only on Castle and Cherry Red versions)	Dave Brock, Robert Calvert	From Love Missile F1-11 single, 1987.	2:00
16.	"Everything That Rises" (only on Castle and Cherry Red versions)	Dave Allen, Barry Andrews, Martyn Barker, Carl Marsh	From Love Missile F1-11 single, 1987.	2:33
17.	"Like An Angel"	Dave Newton, Tony Linehan	From Love Missile F1-11 single, 1987.	2:32

Castle Records Bonus Tracks
No.	Title	Writer(s)	Sources & Credits	Length
18.	"Beaver Patrol"	Tim Archibalds	From Box Frenzy album, 1987.	3:09
19.	"Bubbles"		From Beaver Patrol single, 1987.	3:11
20.	"There Is No Love Between Us Anymore (12" Version)"		From There Is No Love Between Us Anymore single, 1987.	5:24
21.	"Picnic In The Sky"		From Beaver Patrol single, 1987.	2:50
22.	"Def.Con.One (7" Version)"		From Def.Con.One single, 1987.	3:41
23.	"Inside You (Live)"		From Def.Con.One single, 1987.	2:37

Cherry Red Records Bonus Tracks
No.	Title	Writer(s)	Sources & Credits	Length
18.	"Dust Me Down (Wild And Wandering Demo)"		Previously unreleased, 1986.	2:52
19.	"Johnny Ray (Wild And Wandering Demo)"	Vestan Pance, Malcolm Treece, Miles Hunt, Chris Fradgely	Previously unreleased, 1986.	5:19
20.	"The Appletree (Wild And Wandering Demo)"	Vestan Pance, Malcolm Treece, Miles Hunt, Chris Fradgely	Previously unreleased, 1986.	3:06
21.	"Summer Girl (Live At Birmingham Uni. 1986)"		From bootlegged audience recording, 1986.	2:30
22.	"Inside You (Pre Beat Box Demo)"		Previously unreleased, 1986.	2:26
23.	"Picnic In The Sky (Pre Beat Box Demo)"		Previously unreleased, 1986.	2:38
24.	"Theresapsychopathin My Soup (Early Version)"		Previously unreleased, 1986.	1:10
25.	"Everything That Rises (New Version)"	Dave Allen, Barry Andrews, Martyn Barker, Carl Marsh	From Love Missile F1-11 single, 1987.	2:34
26.	"Oh Grebo, I Think I Love You (New Version)"		From Beaver Patrol single, 1987.	3:32
27.	"Bubbles"		From Beaver Patrol single, 1987.	3:10
28.	"Ugly"		From Beaver Patrol single, 1987.	1:35

== Personnel ==
Pop Will Eat Itself

- Clint Mansell – lead vocals, guitars
- Adam Mole – guitars, keyboards, synthesizers
- Richard March – bass
- Graham Crabb – drums, backing and lead vocals
