= Mesmerizer =

Mesmerizer may refer to:

- "Mesmerizer" (song), a Vocaloid song by 32ki
- Another term for a magnetizer, someone who practises animal magnetism

== See also ==
- Mesmerize (disambiguation)
- Mesmerized (disambiguation)
