= This Is the Day...This Is the Hour...This Is This! =

Studio album by Pop Will Eat Itself
- Released: 1 May 1989
- Recorded: 1988
- Genre: Electronic; sound collage; hard rock; rap rock
- Length: 51:26
- Label: RCA
- Producer: Flood

Pop Will Eat Itself chronology
Now for a Feast! (1988)	This Is the Day...This Is the Hour...This Is This! (1989)	Cure for Sanity (1990)

Singles from This Is the Day...This Is the Hour...This Is This!
- 1. "Def. Con. One" Released: 11 July 1988; 2. "Can U Dig It?" Released: 30 January 1989; 3. "Wise Up! Sucker" Released: 10 April 1989

This Is the Day...This Is the Hour...This Is This! is the second studio album by English rock band Pop Will Eat Itself, released on 1 May 1989 by RCA Records. It builds upon the band's 1987 debut Box Frenzy in its extensive usage of sampling, combining influences from punk rock, hip hop, heavy metal, and disco music, with samples and lyrics that reference, among many subjects, pop culture and otaku culture. Particularly influential on the album's musical style were hip hop group Public Enemy, while the album's own subtle post-punk touches would later be credited as influential. Some critics regard it as a sound collage. The album artwork, designed by The Designer's Republic, touches on nuclear warfare themes.

The album peaked at #24 for two weeks on the UK Albums Chart, and at #169 on the US Billboard 200 for six weeks. The three singles from the album – "Def. Con. One", "Can U Dig It?", and "Wise Up! Sucker" – were among the band's most successful to date. The album received critical acclaim, with praise for its invention, humour, and self-contained style. Cherry Red Records released a two-disc deluxe edition of the album in 2011 that includes unreleased bonus tracks.

== Background and recording ==
The Stourbridge-based Pop Will Eat Itself started in 1986 as a Buzzcocks-influenced indie rock band. Though initially associated with the C86 scene, their rougher, rockier sound led to them being championed by the music press as one of several grebo bands that were emerging from Midlands, with the word "grebo" itself having been revived by the band. Band member Graham Crabb said: "We revived this '70s [slang] word for dork or nerd, and the press had to build this movement around it to describe everyone with long hair and a nasty guitar sound." The band thought their musical style was "pretty much going down a cul de sac" until they found numerous other "more interesting" influences. Crabb reflected: "We just started listening to a lot of new stuff, stuff we hadn't heard before. We saw Run-DMC and the Beastie Boys come over and play, and they blew us away."

Having been inspired by groups such as Age of Chance, the band immersed themselves with sampling, drawing material from artists as disparate as Iggy Pop and James Brown, while Crabb would quickly join Clint Mansell as the band's second frontman after his previous tenure as the band's drummer, while a drum machine took that place. The success of the band's debut album Box Frenzy (1987) led to increased interest of the band's second album.

This Is the Day...This Is the Hour...This Is This! was produced by Flood, who one critic felt brought his notable production talent to the fore of the album, helping shape it into becoming "its own sprawling but self-contained universe". Dave Pine engineered the album with assistance from Karl Broadie. Nonetheless, numerous songs on the album feature different engineers and producers; for example, "Can U Dig It?" was produced by David Steele and Andy Cox of Fine Young Cannibals and formerly The Beat, while "Def. Con. One" features production by Robert Gordon and turntable scratching from DJ Winston, both influential figures in the birth of Sheffield bleep techno. "Wild guitar" is contributed to two songs by The Buzzard, while "Stun guitar" is played by Frank Booth on "Preaching to the Perverted."

== Music ==
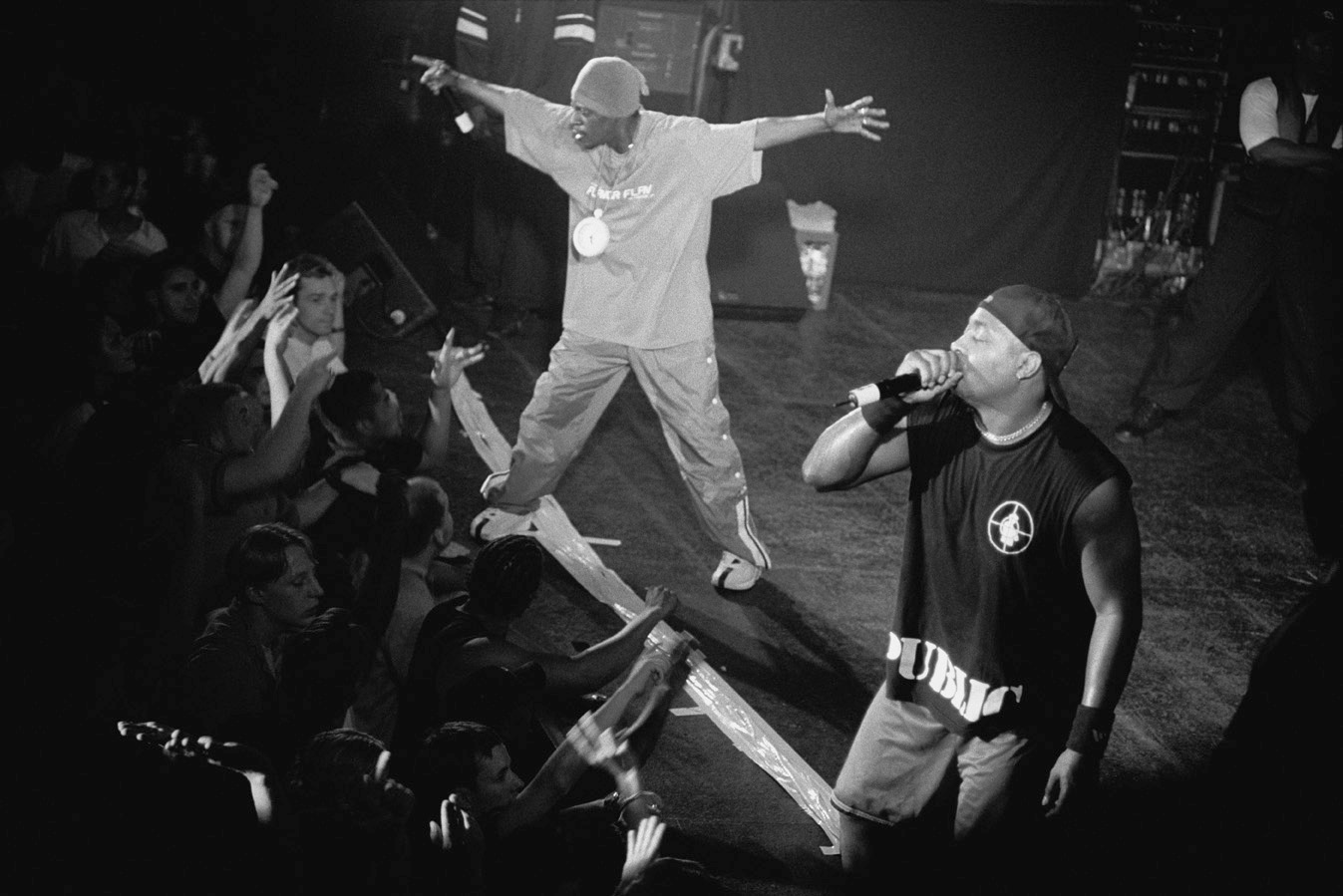
Public Enemy were a key influence on This Is the Day...This Is the Hour...This Is This!

This Is the Day...This Is the Hour...This Is This! features the band's unique "mesh and mix" of pop culture from the United States and particularly the United Kingdom, and combines metal guitar riffs, disco backing and conspicuous drum stomps. Influences of rap, heavy metal and the band's early influence of punk rock are spliced with numerous "found" auto artefacts "collected from all over the junk-culture landscape", including Motown snippets, advertising slogans and the "play-by-play call of a John Elway touchdown pass. Throughout the album, there are what AllMusic's Ned Raggett described as "intriguing surprises", including multiple moody goth and post-punk elements. The music press found the band's sound hard to categorise. Band member Graham Crabb explained: "Nobody's really come up with a description of what we do, and we're quite happy about that. It gives us absolute freedom."

With the album's heavy usage of sampling, Trouser Press called the album a sound collage and noted the influence of the band's affection for Blade Runner's "sci-fi nihilism" and the innovative comic books of Alan Moore. Joe Boehm of the LA Times agreed the album was an "assaultive" sound collage, writing that the eclectic album is a "funny smorgasboard in which a seemingly endless array of pop styles and media messages are sampled, tasted and either spat out or savoured (Rick Astley, nuclear warfare, fast food and alcoholism fail to meet the taste test; science-fiction fantasy and pop styles that are noisy, emphatic, and identified with troublemakers win the blue ribbon)." Robin Reinhardt of Spin noted the influence of Public Enemy, and Crabb would later state that the influence of Public Enemy's second album It Takes a Nation of Millions to Hold Us Back (1988) was "stamped, trodden and embedded" within This Is the Day. Band member Clint Mansell elaborated on this:

We definitely like the format of Public Enemy's album in the fact it all runs together. It doesn't really stop. Some tracks are intermingles and things like that. Our songs '16 Different Flavours of Hell' and 'PWEI Is a Four Letter Word' are sort of short, cut up things. That's something we took from Public Enemy because we really liked it. Sampling is just something we're into really. We were described as being a piece of blotting paper because we soak so many things. I suppose that's what we do. We're open to a lot of influences and music is changing all the time.

In Kembrew McLeod and Peter DiCola's book Creative License: The Law and Culture of Digital Sampling, they write that the album made extreme usage of sampling, noting its excessive samples from songs (including two songs by Salt 'n' Pepa, three songs by Public Enemy, "Bike" by Pink Floyd, "We Care a Lot" by Faith No More, "That's Right" by Mantronix, "Shout" by Tears for Fears, "Jungle Law" by Love & Rockets, "Foxy Lady" by Jimi Hendrix, "Astley's in the Noose" by The Wonder Stuff and "Paid in Full" by Eric B. and Rakim), as well as samples of the films RoboCop, The Island of Dr. Moreau, The Deer Hunter, Evil Dead II, Dirty Harry, Casablanca and The Warriors, as well as a Rice Krispies television commercial, The Twilight Zone and the Super Bowl XXII.

=== Songs ===
On "Preaching to the Perverted", Crabb sings "So we steal, so what? So far so good, we're Robin Hoods." "Wise Up! Sucker" contains a "sharp, mocking backing vocal" from Miles Hunt of The Wonder Stuff. One of the songs which "really taps into the heart of PWEI's science-fiction obsession", "Inject Me" features a breakbeat and "murky" beginning, With its "shady" and "creepy" sustained narrative, it starts with what appears to be a "first-person reverie of some slacker junkie", with the song's introductory lyrics whispered by Crabb, whose voice becomes more paranoid and sharper when the verse begins, with science-fiction-style lyrics forming the rest of the song, though one critic noted that "it's unclear whether the whole SF scenario is happening only in the narrator's addled brainpan." The beat is sampled from "Jimbrowski" by The Jungle Brothers, itself sampling the beat from Funkadelic's "Good Old Music". The lyrics of the propulsive "Can U Dig It?" are largely a list of things the band loves, including Dirty Harry, DJ Spinderella, The Twilight Zone and V for Vendetta. Jason Heller of Tor.com said the song contains most of the album's geek culture references, while Trouser Press compared the song to "We Love You" by the Psychedelic Furs, itself "a catalog of cool".

"Def. Con. One" samples Siouxsie Sioux, Rod Serling, the Beastie Boys, as well as paying homage to the Stooges and Funkytown by Lipps, Inc. in a "seamless dadaist stew." The song is a "portrayal of armageddon Judge Dredd style." "Not Now James, We're Busy...", described by Raggett as "wickedly bizarre", began as a joke regarding hip hop groups that would continually plagiarise beats and riffs from James Brown's discography, but turned into a song recounting Brown's police capture in 1988 after a car chase. Several months after the album's release, Big Audio Dynamite released "James Brown", a song with the same subject matter on their own sound collage-styled album Megatop Phoenix. Crabb said: "We were really surprised, 'cause some of the lyrics are so similar. We used some press clips to get the lyrics right. Perhaps B.A.D. did the same." "Wake Up! Time to Die..." features feedback and "collapsing inward drones."

== Artwork ==
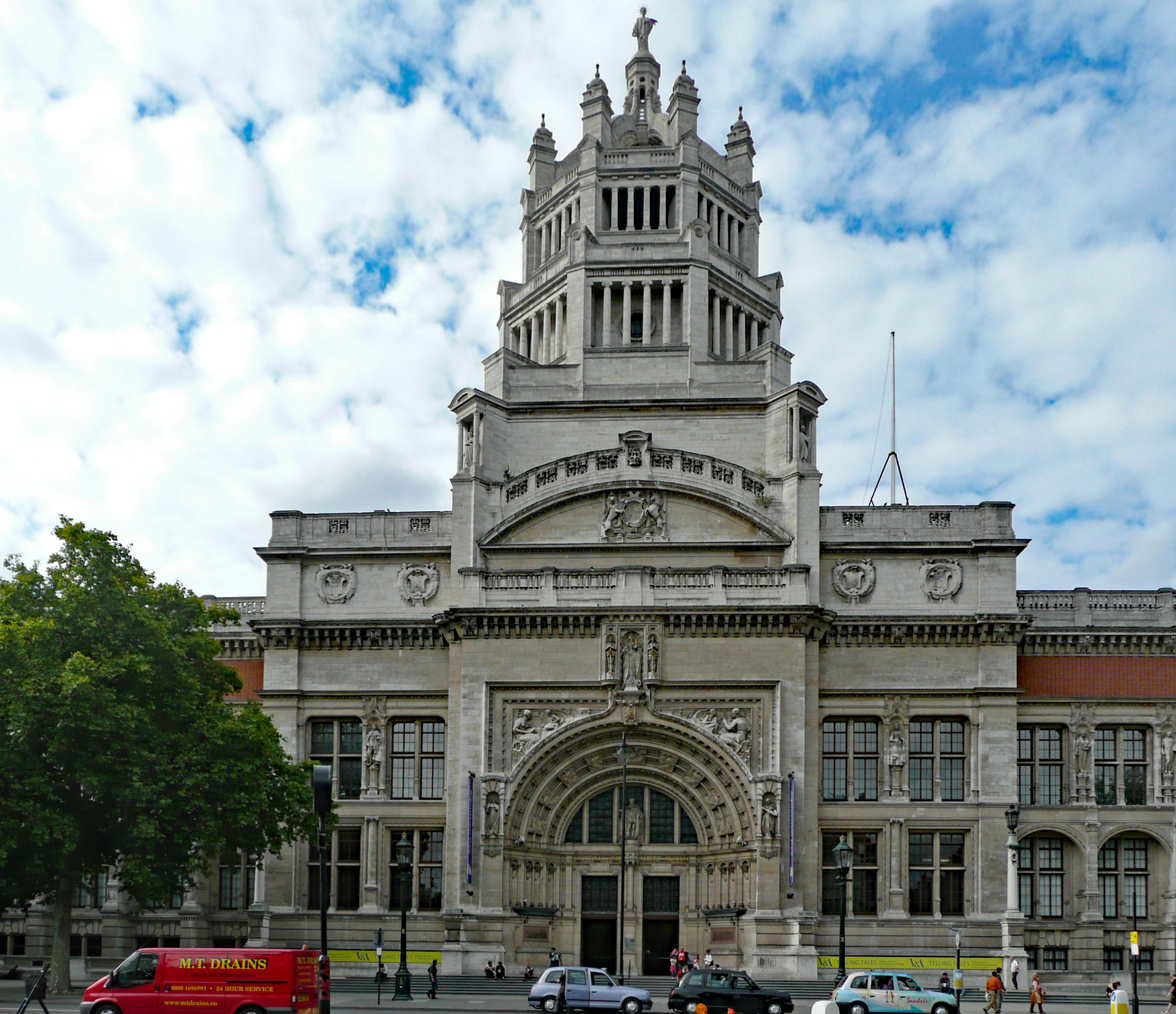
The album artwork is housed at the Victoria & Albert Museum.

The artwork of This Is the Day...This Is the Hour...This Is This! was designed by design agency The Designers Republic. It was the second project the agency created in terms of "creating worlds, like 'the world of Pop Will Eat Itself'." It incorporates themes of Doomsday imagery, radiation, the Doomsday Clock, and the planet being destroyed. Ian Anderson of the agency reflected: "There were still lots of politics about nuclear weapons, so this was kind of political, but not anything specific, more an entertaining prediction." The studio's tendency to recycle cultural icons is readily established in the album artwork, which parodies several familiar corporate logos and icons "to generate layers of new messages". Anderson called the artwork a mixture of "medieval information technology – digital (Mac and Amiga) vs. mechanical (paste-up and graph paper)." The album packaging also marks the first appearance of the band's popular robot-head logo. Steve Mason of AllMusic felt the packaging was inspired by an earlier Designer's Republic album sleeve, that of Age of Chance's One Thousand Years of Trouble (1987).

The agency developed a logo for the band "and then used it like a national emblem". The band's iconic T-shirt of the period featured an edited version of the trademarked Pepsi logo, changed to read "PWEI" with the phrase "Sample It, Loop It, Fuck It, Eat It" surrounding the logo. A copy of the vinyl version of the album, complete with the packaging, as well as the case and inlay for the cassette version, are housed in the Victoria & Albert Museum collection. Also on permanent display at the museum are the packaging for the single "Wise Up! Sucker", which is based on different spines of blank VHS tapes. Anderson explained: "Really, it's another consumerist thing, it doesn't have any of the meanings that people have attributed to it [...] I was just sitting at home looking at my shelves when I thought of it. There is a reason though: I liked the tapes' cases more than I liked what was on them, so it was about why you'd buy into one brand over another."

== Release and promotion ==
The Watchmen-themed "Def. Con. One" was released by the band's early label Chapter 22 on 1 July 1988, reaching number 63 on the UK Singles Chart. Later in the year, the band were signed to major label RCA Records, who released This Is the Day...This is the Hour...This Is This! in the United Kingdom on 1 May 1989 and in the United States and Japan on 18 July 1989. Not all the samples on the album were licensed, as the band found musicians and labels to be "awkward" when they asked to sample their material, whereas "[i]f you don't ask they hardly ever notice you've used them." As such, writers Kembrew McLeod and Peter DiCola noted that it was unusual the album was released on a major label, musing that "it is hard to believe that the record company was clueless about its content".

With the band on a new label, "Can U Dig It?" was the first official single from the album, released on 9 February 1989 and charting at number 38 in the UK Singles Chart, becoming their highest-charting single yet. "Wise Up! Sucker" became the final single from the album on 1 April 1989, subsequently charting at number 41 in the UK charts. These were followed by the release of the album itself, which peaked at number 24 on the UK Albums Chart and stayed on the chart for two weeks. Meanwhile, it also charted at number 169 on the US Billboard 200, and stayed on the chart for six weeks. Throughout 1989, Pop Will Eat Itself toured numerous countries in support of the album. On 25 September 2011, Cherry Red Records released a special edition of the album that features a bonus disc of rare and unreleased tracks.

== Reception and legacy ==
Professional ratings
Review scores
Source	Rating
AllMusic	4.5/5 stars
The Encyclopedia of Popular Music	4/5 stars

This Is the Day...This is the Hour...This Is This! received critical acclaim. Ned Raggett of AllMusic said the album was "brilliant" and "underrated", adding that "the band's sound has never been thicker and more detailed, and while the sampling and arranging are always clearly a product of their late-'80s times, like the Beasties did that year with Paul's Boutique, PWEI comes up with its own sharp synthesis." He said that "the brilliant, shuddering singles alone" are worth the album's price, and commended Flood's production skills, saying he "brought his considerable production skills to the fore and helped shape an album that was its own sprawling but self-contained universe". He later described the album as "Pop Will Eat Itself's crowning moment—an exciting, energetic, and very modern English response to the Beastie Boys' own culture-gobbling antics."

Trouser Press were very favourable to the album, calling it an "aurally exciting sonic collage" and concluding that, "bright, vital and bitingly funny, this record teems with invention". Jason Ankeny of AllMusic called it the band's masterpiece. It was cited as the first of three consecutive groundbreaking albums by the band in The Rough Guide to Rock. On the BBC's "Keeping It Peel" feature, they described the album as the band's "most effective outing", while Jason Heller of The A.V. Club called the album an "electronic, sample-heavy classic." At the end of 1989, NME ranked the album at number 22 in its list of the 50 best albums of the year. Graham Crabb later reflected that the album was "probably our best piece of work".

In his book Cinema Detours, Mike White said the album was the most notable of several examples of pop culture to use lines from the film The Warriors. Brainwashed cited the album one of several late 1980s albums that "[turned] the sampler into an instrument of unparalleled complexity", noting that the band "were mining cartoons, commercials, and funk 45s" on the album. Ned Raggett also commented that the "fair dollop of moody goth/post-punk touches" on the album inadvertently predicted where the group Massive Attack "partially ended up". Parry Gettleman of the Orlando Sentinel, meanwhile, said the album found the group "gorging themselves on grungy hip hop". Jason Heller of Tor.com called the album the band's "opus" and "a writhing pile of punk, rap, samples, and geek-culture references". Particular praise was reserved for "Inject Me", saying "the Asimov reference and bleak, narco-apocalyptic atmosphere make 'Inject Me' a mini-masterpiece."

== Track listing ==
No.	Title	Writer(s)	Length
1.	"PWEI Is A Four Letter Word" (memory used 8927byte, 93.3BPM)	Adam Mole, Graham Crabb	1:12
2.	"Preaching to the Perverted" (memory used 9683byte, 100BPM)	Mole, Clint Mansell, Crabb, Richard March	4:16
3.	"Wise Up! Sucker" (memory used 14895byte, 96BPM)	Mole, Mansell, Crabb, March	3:17
4.	"Sixteen Different Flavours of Hell" (memory used 5486byte, 96BPM)	Mole, Mansell, Crabb, March	2:03
5.	"Inject Me" (memory used 6798byte, 97BPM)	Crabb	4:31
6.	"Can U Dig It?" (memory used 27707byte, 129BPM)	Mansell	4:32
7.	"The Fuses Have Been Lit" (memory used 15789byte, 120BPM)	Mole, Mansell, Crabb, March	4:03
8.	"Poison to the Mind" (memory used 6894byte, 95BPM)	Crabb	0:58
9.	"Def. Con. One" (memory used 18988byte, 118BPM)	Mansell	4:00
10.	"Radio P.W.E.I." (memory used 8526byte, 96BPM)	Crabb	3:37
11.	"Shortwave Transmission on 'Up to the Minuteman Nine'" (memory used 12345byte, 96BPM)	Mansell	1:01
12.	"Satellite Ecstatica" (memory used 19978byte, 132BPM)	Crabb, March	3:33
13.	"Not Now James, We're Busy..." (memory used 48990byte, 120BPM)	Crabb, March	3:09
14.	"Wake Up! Time to Die..." (memory used 84893byte, 148BPM)	Crabb	6:42
15.	"Wise Up! Sucker ('12 Youth Mix)" (memory used 84891byte, 96BPM)	Mole, Mansell, Crabb, March	5:44

== Personnel ==
Adapted from Discogs.

=== Performance ===
- Clint Mansell – vocals
- Graham Crabb – vocals
- Adam Mole – guitar
- Richard March – guitar
- "The Buzzard" – wild guitar (tracks 3, 6, 13)
- Frank Booth – stun guitar (track 2)
- Winston "DJ Winston" Hazel – turntables

=== Technical ===
- The Designers Republic – artwork
- Enzo Townsend – engineering (track 9)
- Dave Pine – engineering (tracks 1, 2, 4, 5, 7, 8, 10–14)
- Robin Goodfellow – engineering (tracks 3, 6)
- Karl Broadie – engineering assistance (tracks 1, 2, 4, 5, 7, 8, 10–14)
- Flood – production (tracks 1–5, 7, 8, 10–14)
- Mr. X & Mr. Y – production (track 3)
- Andy Cox & David Steele – production (track 6)
- Robert Gordon – production (track 9)
- Alan Wilson – mastering

== Charts ==
Chart (1989–1990)	Peak position
Australian Albums (ARIA)	128
UK Albums Chart	24
Billboard 200	169

== Release history ==
Region	Date	Distributing Label
UK	1 May 1989	RCA
US/Japan	18 July 1989	RCA
