= Sycophant Records =

- Sycophant Records logo
- Founded: 1989
- Defunct: 1995
- Distributor(s): independent record label
- Genre: Punk, Rock, Grebo
- Location: Nottingham, England

Sycophant Records was a Nottingham based Independent label that published its first vinyl single release in 1990 for a local band called Meatfly. This release followed with more signings and releases from the likes of Force Fed, Skink, Pitchshifter, and the Scum Pups, to name but a few.

Sycophant Records was no stranger to chart success as it was while with Sycophant Records, the Leicester-based band Scum Pups released their first 'mini' album Babykill, which held No.17 in the Melody Maker indie record album charts, during March 1992.
