= Poppiecock =

EP by Pop Will Eat Itself
- Released: 27 October 1986
- Genre: Grebo
- Label: Chapter 22

EP chronology
The Poppies Say GRRrrr! (1986)	Poppiecock (1986)	Very Metal Noise Pollution (1989)

Poppiecock is the second EP by British grebo band Pop Will Eat Itself, released in the same year as the previous, The Poppies Say GRRrrr!. The musical style remains similar to that of the first EP, with short distorted-guitar-driven tracks with simple melodies and rhythms. This style continued until Graham Crabb's movement from a drumming position to lead vocals in mid-1987.

Two versions of the EP were released: the original 7" version and a 12" version which contained all of the songs from The Poppies Say GRRrrr! on the B-side, in addition to the Poppiecock songs on side A. All songs on Poppiecock and The Poppies Say GRRrrr! appear on the 1988 compilation Now for a Feast!, along with several unreleased tracks from the era.

== Track listing ==
=== 7" version ===
Side One

1. "The Black Country Chainstore Massacre" 1:42
2. "Monogamy" 1:39

Side Two

1. "Oh Grebo, I Think I Love You" 1:53
2. "Titanic Clown" 1:24
3. "B-B-B-Breakdown" 1:37

=== 12" version ===
Side One

1. "The Black Country Chainstore Massacre" 1:42
2. "Monogamy" 1:39
3. "Oh Grebo, I Think I Love You" 1:53
4. "Titanic Clown" 1:24
5. "B-B-B-Breakdown" 1:37

Side Two

1. "I'm Sniffin With You Hoo" 0:53
2. "Sick Little Girl" 2:29
3. "Mesmerized" 1:27
4. "Theresapsychopathin My Soup" 1:05
5. "Candydiosis" 1:00
