= The Poppies Say GRRrrr! =

EP by Pop Will Eat Itself
- Released: 17 May 1986
- Genre: Grebo
- Label: Desperate Records

EP chronology
| The Poppies Say GRRrrr! (1986) | Poppiecock (1986) |

The Poppies Say GRRrrr! is the first release by British grebo band Pop Will Eat Itself. It was originally released on 7" vinyl in a brown paper bag, of which only 500 copies were produced for sale at a concert, however, it was later repressed onto a 7" vinyl with an orange printed sleeve.

The EP contained five short songs which were all later released on a version of Poppiecock, the following release by the band. They also appeared in the 1988 compilation "Now For A Feast!". These songs had the sound distinctive of early Pop Will Eat Itself, with simple chord structures and rhythms, driven by vintage-style distorted electric guitar. This style persisted until 1987, when the drummer, Graham Crabb, switched to a lead vocal role and the band became abruptly more electronic.

== Track listing ==
All songs composed by Vestan Pance.

Side One

1. "I'm Sniffin' With You Hoo" 0:53
2. "Sick Little Girl" 2:29

Side Two

1. "Mesmerized" 1:27
2. "Theresapsychopathin My Soup" 1:05
3. "Candydiosis" 1:00
