= Mesmerized =

Mesmerized or Mesmerised may refer to:

== Film and television ==
- Mesmerized (film), a 1986 American film by Michael Laughlin
- Mesmerised (TV series), a 2015 Australian television series

== Music ==
- Mesmerized (Extol album), 1999
- Mesmerized (Meredith Andrews album), 2005
- Mesmerized (EP), by Seirom, 2015
- Mesmerised, an album by Atrox, 1997
- "Mesmerized" (song), by Faith Evans, 2005
- "Mesmerized", a song by Mariah Carey from The Rarities, 2020
- "Mesmerized", a song by Pop Will Eat Itself from The Poppies Say GRRrrr!, 1986

== See also ==
- Mesmerize (disambiguation)
