= Box Frenzy =

Studio album by Pop Will Eat Itself
- Released: 26 October 1987
- Recorded: June–July 1987
- Studio: Fon Studios, Sheffield
- Genre: Grebo
- Length: 44:00
- Label: Chapter 22; Rough Trade
- Producer: Robert Gordon

Pop Will Eat Itself chronology
Box Frenzy (1987)	Now for a Feast! (1988)

Singles from Box Frenzy
- 1. "Beaver Patrol" Released: 1987; 2. "There Is No Love Between Us Anymore" Released: 1988

Professional ratings
Review scores
Source	Rating
AllMusic	3/5 stars

Box Frenzy is the debut studio album by the English rock band Pop Will Eat Itself. It was released on 26 October 1987 in the United Kingdom by Chapter 22 Records and in the United States by Rough Trade Records.

At the end of 1987, the NME ranked the album at number 49 in their list of the top 50 "Albums of the Year". Q also included it in their unordered list of the year's 50 best albums. In 2005, The Word included the album in the second part of its list "Hidden Treasure: Great Underrated Albums of Our Time."

== Singles ==
The track "There Is No Love Between Us Anymore" samples the songs "When I Fall In Love" by Nat King Cole, and "You've Lost That Loving Feeling" by The Righteous Brothers. Their better-known track "Hit the Hi-Tech Groove" not only samples the techno-disco song "Respectable" by Mel & Kim, as well as the Whistle song "Just Buggin'", but defiantly boasts that the band steals (though they actually sample) as many varieties of sounds that they can get to make their music, ranging from other people's songs to television soundbites.

The song "There Is No Love Between Us Anymore" was released on 7" and 12" vinyl on 18 January 1988, as the second single from Box Frenzy. An eight-track CD version featuring a small collection of non-album tracks was released in 1991. It is a mainly instrumental track, and the only lyrics that are not sampled are the title of the song. It samples the songs "When I Fall in Love" by Nat King Cole and "You've Lost That Loving Feeling" by the Righteous Brothers. A sample of Joanna Lumley saying "he loves me, he loves me not" from The New Avengers is prominent throughout the song, and the line would be revisited in Pop Will Eat Itself's 1989 song "Wise Up! Sucker".

The versions found on "There Is No Love Between Us Anymore" are all different to the album version, but the 7" version that appears on the CD single is the same as the album version but with an added intro sampling Nat King Cole's "When I Fall in Love." The Specially Extended Dance Mix is remixed by UK producer Robert Gordon, who worked closely with the band for a large portion of their career. The B-side, "Picnic in the Sky," is a reworked song originally composed in 1986 in the style distinctive of the band's music of that era. "Hit the Hi-Tech Groove," the B-side on the remix 12", appears in the same version on Box Frenzy. "...On the Razor's Edge..." is a remix of the album track "Grebo Guru", and "Kiss That Girl" is exclusive to the "There Is No Love Between Us Anymore" single (although it later appeared on Box Frenzy reissues).

The release of "There Is No Love Between Us Anymore" showed a marked increase in sales for the band, with the single reaching #66 on the UK singles chart. A music video was recorded featuring shots of a couple's relationship, with only very brief views of the band, consisting of extreme closeups from several angles. It appears on the video album Unspoilt by Progress along with a snippet of the band performing the song live while Graham Crabb was still playing drums for the group.

== Track listing ==
No.	Title	Writer(s)	Length
1.	"Grebo Guru"	Graham Crabb	3:56
2.	"Beaver Patrol" (The Wilde Knights cover)	Tim Archibald	3:08
3.	"Let's Get Ugly"	Clint Mansell, Richard March, Adam Mole	4:00
4.	"U.B.L.U.D."	Vestan Pance	3:49
5.	"Inside You"	Mansell	2:37
6.	"Evelyn"	Pance	3:16
7.	"There Is No Love Between Us Anymore"	Crabb	3:55
8.	"She's Surreal"	Pance	4:09
9.	"Intergalactic Love Mission (instrumental)"	Pance	3:53
10.	"Love Missile F1-11" (Sigue Sigue Sputnik cover)	Martin Degville, Anthony Edward James, Neal Whitmore	4:10
11.	"Hit the Hi-Tech Groove"	Pance	5:10
12.	"Razorblade Kisses (instrumental)"	Pance	1:50

Bonus tracks

2003 bonus tracks
No.	Title	Writer(s)	Length
13.	"Bubbles"		3:11
14.	"Ugly"	Pance	1:35
15.	"Picnic in the Sky"	Pance	2:49
16.	""...On the Razors Edge...""	Pance	4:10
17.	"Kiss That Girl"	Pance	1:47
18.	"Def Con One"	Marius Constant, Crabb, March, Mole	3:43
19.	"Hit the Hi-Tech Groove (live)"	Crabb, Mansell, March, Mole	5:00
20.	"She's Surreal (live)"	Crabb, Mansell, March, Mole	4:20
21.	"Pop Will Eat Itself at Def Con One"	Pance	4:39

== Samples ==
Let's Get Ugly

- "Rock The Bells" by L.L. Cool J

There Is No Love Between Us Anymore

- "When I Fall In Love" by Nat King Cole
- "You've Lost That Loving Feeling" by The Righteous Brothers

Hit the Hi-Tech Groove

- "Stand and Deliver" by Adam and the Ants
- "Respectable" by Mel & Kim
- "Just Buggin'" by Whistle
- "The Jack That House Built" by Jack 'N' Chill

== Personnel ==
Pop Will Eat Itself

- Clint Mansell – vocals
- Graham Crabb – vocals
- Adam Mole – guitar
- Richard March – guitar
- Dr Nightmare – dance machine, sampling

with:

- Ruth Joy – backing vocals on "Beaver Patrol" and "U.B.L.U.D."
