= Def Con One =

1988 single by Pop Will Eat Itself

Single by Pop Will Eat Itself

from the album This Is the Day...This Is the Hour...This Is This!
- B-side: "Inside You (Live)"
- Released: 11 July 1988
- Genre: Electronic rock
- Length: 4:00 (Album version); 3:44 (7″ single version)
- Label: Chapter 22
- Songwriters: Marius Constant, Graham Crabb, Clinton Mansell, Richard March & Adam Mole
- Producer: Flood

Pop Will Eat Itself singles chronology
"There Is No Love Between Us Anymore" (1988)	"Def Con One" (1988)	"Can U Dig It?" (1989)

"Def Con One" (Note: Stylised as "Def.Con One" on the single and "Def. Con. One" on the album release.) is a song by Pop Will Eat Itself released as a single in July 1988 and included on the 1989 album This Is the Day...This Is the Hour...This Is This!. The single reached number 63 in the UK Singles chart in late July 1988.

The song combines several musical genres and features elements of alternative rock, hip-hop, pop and punk, but was proclaimed by the band to be grebo rock. It is an early example of a song composed by sampling other songs and musical scores, including "I Wanna Be Your Dog" by the Stooges, "Funkytown" by disco band Lipps Inc., the 1973 hit "Crazy Horses" by the Osmonds and The Twilight Zone theme tune. The title comes from the United States' Defense Readiness Condition DEFCON 1, which signifies that "war is imminent".

Several versions of the song are found on the 1988 single, although none is the version that would appear on This Is the Day...This Is the Hour...This Is This! the following year. The live tracks that appear on the 12″ single and CD editions were recorded in Gothenburg, Sweden, during a tour in March 1988.

A music video was recorded for the song that appears on the 1991 video release Unspoilt by Progress. It features the band performing the song in front of a large image of the This Is the Day...This Is the Hour...This Is This! album cover. An effect is used that freezes and blurs the image several times a second. The album version of the song is used in the video.

== Track listing ==
=== 7″ version ===
Side One

1. "Def.Con.One (7″ Version)" 3:44

Side Two

1. "Inside You (Live in Gothenburg)" 2:33

=== 12" version ===
Side One

1. "Def.Con.One (12″ Version)" 4:40

Side Two

1. "Inside You (Live in Gothenburg)" 2:38
2. "She's Surreal (Live in Gothenburg)" 4:20
3. "Hit the Hi-Tech Groove (Live in Gothenburg)" 5:01

=== CD version ===
1. "Def.Con.One (7″ Version)" 3:44
2. "Inside You (Live in Gothenburg)" 2:38
3. "She's Surreal (Live in Gothenburg)" 4:20
4. "Hit the Hi-Tech Groove (Live in Gothenburg)" 5:01

=== Remix 12″ version ===
Side One

1. "Def.Con.One (The Doomsday Powermix)" 5:58

Side Two

1. "Def.Con.One (7″ Version)" 3:44
2. "Inside You (Live in Gothenburg)" 2:38
3. "She's Surreal (Live in Gothenburg)" 4:20.
