= The Kings of Frog Island =

British alternative rock band

- Also known as: TKOFI / KOFI
- Origin: Leicester, England
- Genres: Stoner rock
- Years active: 2003–present
- Label: Elektrohasch Records / The Kings of Frog Island
- Members: Mark Buteux; Lee Madel-Toner; Gavin Searle; Phil Moorhouse
- Past members: Roger Watson; Anthony Heslop; Jim Robinson; Mat Bethancourt; Midge Day; Gregg Hunt

The Kings of Frog Island are an English stoner rock collective drawing from psychedelic and retro rock traditions. The Kings of Frog Island formed in Leicester, England (hence Frog Island) in 2003, as a collaboration between guitarist and producer Mark Buteux, along with R. "Doj" Watson, a founding member of the grunge/punk group Scum Pups and Mat Bethancourt, of the rock bands Josiah and The Beginning. The band released their debut, self-titled album with German-based Elektrohasch Records in 2005. Work on the first album involved some input from guest artists associated with members of the band's musical past, most notably, Matthew (Midge) Day of Scum Pups. Mathew Bethancourt left The Kings of Frog Island in 2010 to concentrate on Cherry Choke, while Mark Buteux, Gavin Searle, Gavin Wright, Tony Heslop and Roger 'Doj' Watson continued work producing a fourth, fifth, sixth, and seventh album as The Kings of Frog Island. They run Amphibia Sound Studios VI and are working on forthcoming projects and collaborations with Bulletree Filmes of Brazil.

== Members ==
- Mark Buteux
- Gavin Searle
- Lee Madel-Toner
- Other members and collaborators include:
- Phil Moorhouse
- Roger (Doj) Watson
- Jim Robinson
- Anthony Heslop
- Mat Bethancourt
- Matthew Day (Midge)
- Gavin Wright
- Julia Dream
- Gregg Hunt
- Leia Buteux
- Neve Buteux
- Scarlett Searle

== Discography ==
- The Kings of Frog Island (2005)
- II (2008)
- III (2010)
- IV (2013)
- V (2014)
- VI (2020)
- The Kings of Frog Island 6.5 (2021)
- VII (2021)
- Stayfree (2022)
