= Can U Dig It? =

Single by Pop Will Eat Itself

from the album This Is the Day...This Is the Hour...This Is This!
- B-side: "Poison to the Mind"
- Released: 30 January 1989
- Genre: Dance-rock
- Length: 4:32
- Label: RCA
- Songwriter: Clinton Mansell
- Producer: Flood

Pop Will Eat Itself singles chronology
"Def. Con. One" (1988)	"Can U Dig It?" (1989)	"Wise Up! Sucker" (1989)

"Can U Dig It?" is a single by British band Pop Will Eat Itself, released in 1989 from the band's second album This Is the Day...This Is the Hour...This Is This! and it peaked at #38 in the UK Charts.

The lyrics include a litany of references to movies, comics, music, and television. The sample in which a male voice is heard yelling "Can you dig it?" several times and the female voice at the beginning of the track saying "Let's get down to it, boppers..." were taken from the cult classic 1979 U.S. action film The Warriors.

== Music video ==
An accompanying music video was made for the single. It features Clint Mansell and Graham Crabb singing the song against various changing backgrounds (many of which reference the song lyrics) while in other parts the rest of the band members perform the song with stacks of TVs behind them.

== Track listing ==
All songs written by Pop Will Eat Itself

12"

A Side
No.	Title	Length
1.	"Can U Dig It? (12" Version)"	6:25
2.	"Poison To the Mind"	2:45

B side
No.	Title	Length
1.	"Radio P.W.E.I (Acapella)"	1:10
2.	"The Fuses Have Been Lit (Instrumental)"	2:07

7"

A Side
No.	Title	Length
1.	"Can U Dig It?"	3:15

B side
No.	Title	Length
1.	"Poison To the Mind"	2:45

CD

No.	Title	Length
1.	"Can U Dig It?"	3:15
2.	"Poison To the Mind"	2:45
3.	"Radio P.W.E.I (Acapella)"	1:10
4.	"Can U Dig It? (Twelve)"	4:25

== Charts ==
Chart (1989)	Peak position
UK Chart	38

== Personnel ==
Clint Mansell - Vocals
Graham Crabb - Vocals
Adam Mole - Guitar
Richard March - Guitar
"The Buzzard" - Wild Guitar
