= Wise Up! Sucker =

1989 single by Pop Will Eat Itself

Single by Pop Will Eat Itself

from the album This Is the Day...This Is the Hour...This Is This!
- B-side: "Orgyone Stimulator"
- Released: 10 April 1989
- Label: RCA
- Songwriter: Clinton Mansell

Pop Will Eat Itself singles chronology
"Can U Dig It?" (1989)	"Wise Up! Sucker" (1989)	"Touched by the Hand of Cicciolina" (1990)

"Wise Up! Sucker" is a single by Pop Will Eat Itself released in 1989 from the album This Is the Day...This Is the Hour...This Is This! The single peaked on the UK Singles Chart at #41.

In addition to CD and cassette, the single was released in 7", 10", and 12" formats, each with a different edit of the song. The 7" version contains the original version that also appears on the album, while the 10" and 12" versions feature two edits of the Youth remix of the song as A-sides.

The B-side, "Orgyone Stimulator", is an instrumental track based on samples from Louise Huebner's Seduction Through Witchcraft. Some versions of the release also contain the Riffs Mix of the Pop Will Eat Itself song "Can U Dig It?".

A music video was filmed for the song, and it appears on the video album Unspoilt By Progress. It features band members Clint Mansell and Graham Crabb singing in front of various backgrounds such as moving landscapes, comics and the band performing live, while other band members Richard March and Adam Mole play guitar in front of an array of screens, all showing themselves playing. The video is intercut with multiple computer-generated effects and animations.

== Track listing ==
=== 7" Single ===
Side One

1. "Wise Up! Sucker" 3:24

Side Two

1. "Orgyone Stimulator" 3:04

=== 10" Single ===
Side One

1. "Wise Up! Sucker (10" Version)" 4:43

Side Two

1. "Wise Up! Sucker (12" Version)" 5:44
2. "Wise Up! Sucker" 3:24

=== 12" Single, CD Single, Cassette Single ===
1. "Wise Up! Sucker (12" Version)" 5:44
2. "Wise Up! Sucker" 3:24
3. "Orgyone Stimulator" 3:04
4. "Can U Dig It? (Riffs Mix)" 3:18
