= The Hunters Club =

British rock band

- Origin: Leicester, England
- Genres: Rock, punk, grebo
- Years active: 1987–1991
- Labels: Trashcan, Tanz, Pig's Ear
- Past members: Otis Oblivion (Ian Redhead) (vocals); Rikki Torrent (guitars); Django Slydog (guitars); Gristle-Hound a.k.a. Baron Greenbeast (bass guitar & drum-machines) (1986-1989); Christian Merciless (guitars) (1987–1989)

The Hunters Club were a British grebo gothic rock band that formed in Leicester, England.

== History ==
The band were named after a short-lived Judge Dredd sub-plot in the sci-fi comic 2000 AD, and were nicknamed "The Black Hole of Rock 'n' Roll". They toured Europe with fellow Leicester band Gaye Bykers on Acid, camping out between gigs. The band were known for burning their hats as part of their live show. First done as a joke at a gig in Brighton, it caused such a stir that they carried on doing it, on one occasion also igniting members of the audience.

Too Far Gone to Turn Around was the first album that Mark Spivey produced, and was the album which inspired members of Cornershop to form a band, "because they’d thought that if that bunch of drunken idiots could make a record that was that good, then maybe they could too". The album met with a lukewarm review from Carole Linfield in Underground magazine, calling their cover of "You Ain't Seen Nothing Yet" "uninspired", but going on to say "the remainder at least begins to kick the dust a bit with steady, early 70s type rockin'".

The last song on the Give Me Your Soul EP was originally recorded for Radio One at the BBC Maida Vale Studios. The Hunters Club folded in 1991 signing off with Burnt Alive, a live album on death-metal label Pigs Ear. Otis Oblivion (Ian Redhead)'s verdict - "It was awful," he said. Redhead now runs 'Stayfree Music - band rehearsal rooms and a live music venue called Lock 42 - both based at 2-4 Frog Island Leicester, Ian also managed local bands during the early 1990s; notably The Scum Pups, and ran the Stayfree Records label.

The band reunited for a concert at The Charlotte in Leicester in November 2008.

Founder member Simon Crane worked as a journalist for the Leicester Mercury from 1992, going on to be appointed new media editor before becoming deputy editor, and later worked as a lecturer at Leicester College. He died in July 2014, aged 54, after suffering a heart attack.

== Discography ==
=== Albums ===
- Too Far Gone to Turn Around mini-LP (1988, Trashcan Records)
- Burnt Alive (live album) (1991, Pigs Ear Records)

=== Singles/EPs ===
- Good Running EP (Trashcan Records)
- Ain't Seen Nothin' Yet EP (Trashcan Records)
- Animal Lover EP (1987, Trashcan Records)
- Give Me Your Soul EP (Trashcan Records)

=== Compilation appearances ===
- Just Say Yeah (Tanz Records)
