= Scum Pups =

British alternative rock band

- Origin: Leicester, England
- Genres: Punk, Rock, Pop, Grebo
- Years active: 1989 – 1994
- Labels: Motivate Records, Sycophant Records, Stayfree Music
- Past members: Mat Day (1989-1994); Roger Watson (1989-1994); Clive Cartwright (1989-1992); Marcus Hessin (1992-1994); Janet Brown (1993); Gaz Birtles (1993)
- Website: Last.FM Radio

Scum Pups was a grunge, punk rock, three piece band, that formed in Leicester, England in November 1989. The band formed while at sixth form college with Matt Day (Midge) heading the trio. The band recorded their first single EP with Hinckley-based Motivate Records while still teenagers in September 1990. This led to a strong teenage fanbase with a reputation for enjoying stage diving and moshing at their gigs.

The band quickly gathered a strong fanbase after being signed to Nottingham label Sycophant Records and began appearing with the likes of Fudge Tunnel, Silverfish and Daisy Chainsaw. It was while with Sycophant Records, the band released their first 'mini' album Babykill, which held No.17 in the Melody Maker indie album charts, during March 1992.

The band signed with Stayfree Music in 1992 and embarked on touring with Crazyhead. During 1992 the band released their second EP "Shudder" on Stayfree, with added sponsorship from N.T.V. Music. It was at this stage that the founder bass player Clive Cartwright left, to be replaced by Marcus (Pepper) Hessin.

The band spent the remaining 18 months touring up and down the country with the likes of Headcleaner and Zodiac Mindwarp and the Love Reaction as well as touring in France. In 1993 the band released a further album Sonic Sculptures, and shared an EP single with Doncaster based band, FUSE; but on return from a further tour in France during February 1994, the band decided to split.

The band had two distinct styles during its four years of activity. The band was initially described as grunge, grebo or metal, but from 1992 onwards, the band took a distinctive turn towards a more glam rock/punk approach, with elements of pop and rock thrown in. It was during this latter stage that their 5th member joined as a backing singer Janet Brown, in 1993.

== Members ==
- Matthew Day - guitar & vocals (1989–1994)
- Clive Cartwright - bass & backing vocals (1989–1992)
- Roger Watson - drums (1989–1994)
- Marcus Hessin - bass & backing vocals (1992–1994)
- Janet Brown - backing vocals (1993)
- Gaz Birtles - sax (1993)

== Discography ==
Motivate Records was the band's first label, distributed under Southern Records Distribution. Sycophant released their first mini-album in 1992, also distributed under S.R.D.

Stayfree Music based in Leicester, was run by the former frontman of The Hunters Club, Ian Redhead, and managed Scum Pups through to their eventual split in February 1994.

- Find Out Why - 7" Single EP released 1990 Motivate Records.
- Babykill - 12" and CD mini album (Bonus track on CD) released 1991 Sycophant Records.
- Shudder - 12" Single EP released 1992 Stayfree Music.
- Sonic Sculptures - CD album released 1993 Stayfree Music.
- "Hit Single" / "Hammer" - 7" Single released 1993 Stayfree Music.

== Current ==
- Roger Watson eventually moved on to form the stoner rock group The Kings Of Frog Island
