= Mesmerize =

Mesmerize or mesmerise may refer to:

- Mesmerism, a pseudoscientific theory by Franz Mesmer
- "Mesmerise" (song), a 1991 song by Chapterhouse
- "Mesmerize" (song), a 2002 song by Ja Rule
- Mesmerize (video game), a 2007 video game

== See also ==
- Mezmerize, a 2005 album by System of a Down
- Mesmerized (disambiguation)
