= Clint Mansell =

English musician and composer (born 1963)

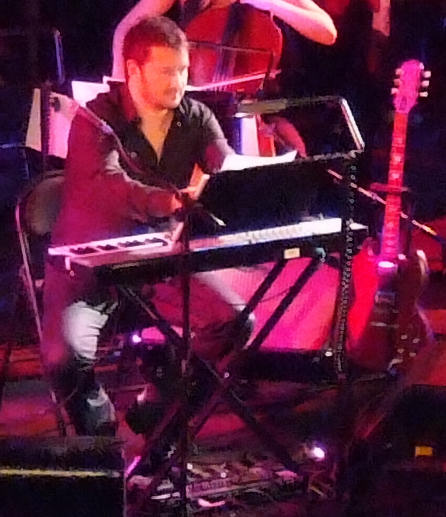
- Mansell with the Sonus Quartet, playing at the Union Chapel, London, 20 July 2009

Background information
- Born: Clinton Darryl Mansell; 7 November 1963 (age 62)
- Origin: Coventry, Warwickshire, England
- Genres: Film score, alternative rock, grebo rock, electronic, industrial rock, classical
- Occupations: Musician, singer, composer
- Instruments: Vocals, keyboards, piano, guitar, bass
- Years active: 1981–present
- Website: iamclintmansell.com

Clinton Darryl Mansell (/ˈmænsəl/; born 7 November 1963) is an English musician, singer, and composer. He served as the lead vocalist of alt-rock band Pop Will Eat Itself. After the band's dissolution, Mansell moved to the United States and embarked on a career as a film score composer.

Mansell partnered with American filmmaker Darren Aronofsky and composed the scores for his films Pi, Requiem for a Dream, The Fountain, The Wrestler, Black Swan, and Noah. Mansell is best known for the Requiem for a Dream soundtrack, particularly the film's composition "Lux Aeterna" and a re-orchestrated version titled "Requiem for a Tower" that was created for The Lord of the Rings: The Two Towers trailer, both of which have been featured in multiple advertisements, films, film trailers, video games and other media.

He provided the scores for the Ben Wheatley films High-Rise, Happy New Year, Colin Burstead, Rebecca, and In the Earth. Other films featuring Mansell's scores include Sahara, Moon and Stoker. He has also composed music for television and video games.

Mansell was nominated for a Golden Globe for his work on The Fountain, and was nominated for multiple awards, including a Grammy Award, for his work on Black Swan.

== Early life ==
Mansell was born in Coventry, England. His father worked for the electricity board and his mother was a preparer of school meals.

Inspired by David Bowie's performance of "Starman" on the television series Top of the Pops, he started to play guitar at the age of nine. His foray into punk-inspired music was influenced by the Ramones. In 2014 he told Beat Magazine "I heard the Ramones and punk rock changed my life." While living in Stourbridge, Mansell played in rock bands as a youth, and at 19 years of age he joined the band that became Pop Will Eat Itself.

== Career ==
=== Alt-rock career ===
From the band's inception in 1986 until their dissolution in 1996, Mansell was a member of grebo/alt-rock band Pop Will Eat Itself (PWEI). He was the band's lead vocalist, guitarist and one of the band's main songwriters. The band was first introduced to computer-based music in 1988 while working with producer Flood on their album This Is the Day...This Is the Hour...This Is This!. Their sound evolved to include sampling and electronic music, bringing influences from hip hop, industrial music and other dance genres into their music. After the band was dropped by RCA, PWEI were signed in 1994 to Nothing Records, a label owned by Trent Reznor of Nine Inch Nails.

Following PWEI's break-up in 1996, Mansell moved to New York, where he hoped to start a solo career, but struggled creatively. He was invited by Reznor to move to an apartment in New Orleans owned by Reznor, where Mansell lived for three years, prior to settling in Los Angeles. It was there that Reznor mentored Mansell and introduced him to Pro Tools. Mansell also performed backing vocals on Nine Inch Nails' 1999 album The Fragile.

Mansell reunited with PWEI in 2005 for their "Reformation" tour, which included performances in Nottingham, Birmingham and London.

=== Film score career ===
While still living in New York, Mansell was introduced to director Darren Aronofsky by a mutual friend. Aronofsky was unaware of Mansell's previous work with Pop Will Eat Itself, however the two men bonded over their love of hip hop and their belief that "film music at the time was terrible."

Aronofsky suggested that Mansell write the opening title piece for Pi, Aronofsky's feature film directorial debut. Aronofsky had intended to use pre-existing electronic music in the rest of the film, but due to a lack of funds, he found it difficult to acquire the rights to much of the music that interested him and Mansell was hired to provide music for the entire film. Mansell's score for the film won him the City of Birmingham award at the Birmingham Film Festival in 2000.

Mansell wrote the score for Aronofsky's next film, Requiem for a Dream, which became a cult hit. The film's primary composition "Lux Aeterna" became a favorite in its own right. A re-orchestrated version of the song, titled "Requiem for a Tower", was arranged by composers Simone Benyacar, Dan Nielsen and Veigar Margeirsson for the trailer of The Lord of the Rings: The Two Towers.

Both "Lux Aeterna" and "Requiem for a Tower" have been used in multiple forms of media, including the film trailers for The Da Vinci Code, I Am Legend, Sunshine and Babylon A.D.; trailers for the video games Assassin's Creed and Lord of the Rings: Return of the King; advertising campaigns for such products as Canon PowerShot cameras, Molson Canadian beer; and on television such as in the series America's Got Talent, So You Think You Can Dance as well as a promo spot the series Flash Forward.

In 2006, Mansell provided the score for the film Smokin' Aces and he received a BMI Film & TV Award for his work on the film Sahara that same year. The following year, his score for the Aronofsky film The Fountain was awarded Best Original Film Score of the Year and the Public Choice Award at the 7th World Soundtrack Awards. The Fountain's score was also nominated for Best Score in a Motion Picture at the 2007 Golden Globe Awards.

Mansell's score for Aronofsky's Black Swan garnered him multiple nominations and awards. He was nominated for the Grammy Award for Best Score Soundtrack for Visual Media as well as Best Original Soundtrack (for Black Swan), and Soundtrack Composer of the Year (for Black Swan, Last Night and Faster) at the 11th World Soundtrack Awards. The score was deemed ineligible for the Academy Award for Best Original Score due to its use of Tchaikovsky's original music from Swan Lake.

Mansell created the film score for Moon, Duncan Jones's feature film directorial debut. Mansell won Best Technical Achievement at the British Independent Film Awards for Moon's score. In 2011 Mansell was hired to provide the score for The Iron Lady, but he was later replaced by composer Thomas Newman. Nevertheless, Mansell's music from the film Moon was used in the film's trailer and was also used in the 2012 trailer of the computer game Aliens: Colonial Marines.

Mansell provided the scores for the films Stoker (also featuring music by Philip Glass) and Filth, which were both released in 2013.

Filmmaker Ben Wheatley, who was a fan of Mansell's music for the films Requiem for a Dream and Moon, approached Mansell about providing the score for his 2015 film High-Rise. Mansell also provided the music for Wheatley's subsequent works Happy New Year, Colin Burstead (2018) and Rebecca (2020) and In the Earth (2021).

Mansell's film scores have been sampled by such musical artists as Lil Jon, A$AP Rocky, Bastille and Paul Oakenfold.

Having no formal training in musical notation, Mansell constructs his film scores using the method he employs for writing rock music — drums, bass, guitar and vocal lines — in addition to employing an orchestrator. Some of his influences include Philip Glass, Trevor Jones, David Holmes, and bands such as Death in Vegas, Mogwai and Unkle.

=== Symphonic performances ===
Mansell has performed some of his film compositions live with the Sonus Quartet in the US, the UK and Australia. The Kronos Quartet, who performed "Lux Aeterna" for the Requiem for a Dream soundtrack, have also performed some of Mansell's work live.

=== Publishing deal ===
In February 2019, Mansell signed a publishing deal with Decca Publishing, a division of Decca Records. This deal brought his catalogue of more than 650 original pieces, including his Pop Will Eat Itself work, under a single umbrella for the first time.

== Awards and nominations ==
Year	Award	Category	Nominated work	Result
2000	Birmingham Film and Television Festival	City of Birmingham Award	Pi	Won
2006	BMI Film & TV Awards	Film Music award	Sahara	Won
2006	Critics' Choice Movie Awards	Best Score	The Fountain	Nominated
2007	Golden Globe	Best Original Score	The Fountain	Nominated
2007	World Soundtrack Award	Best Original Film Score	The Fountain	Won
2009	British Independent Film Awards	Best Technical Achievement	Moon	Nominated
2010	Chicago Film Critics Association Award	Best Original Score	Black Swan	Won
2010	Critics' Choice Movie Awards	Best Score	Black Swan	Nominated
2010	Satellite Awards	Best Original Score	Black Swan	Nominated
2011	World Soundtrack Award	Best Original Score of the Year	Black Swan	Nominated
2011	World Soundtrack Award	Soundtrack Composer of the Year	Black Swan, Last Night and Faster	Nominated
2011	BMI Film & TV Awards	Film Music award	Black Swan	Won
2012	Grammy Award	Best Score Soundtrack for Visual Media	Black Swan	Nominated
2014	Hollywood Music in Media Awards	Best Original Score in a Sci-Fi/Fantasy Film	Noah	Nominated
2017	Annie Awards	Outstanding Achievement for Music in a Feature Production	Loving Vincent	Nominated

== Discography ==
=== with Pop Will Eat Itself ===
- Box Frenzy (1987)
- This Is the Day...This Is the Hour...This Is This! (1989)
- Cure for Sanity (1990)
- The Looks or the Lifestyle? (1992)
- Dos Dedos Mis Amigos (1994)

==== Live albums ====
- Weird's Bar and Grill (Live) (1993) UK No. 44
- The Radio 1 Sessions 1986-87 (1997)
- Reformation: Nottingham Rock City 20.01.05 (2005)
- Reformation: Birmingham Carling Academy 22.01.05 (2005)
- Reformation: Birmingham Carling Academy 23.01.05 (2005)
- Reformation: London Shepherds Bush Empire 24.01.05 (2005)
- Reformation: London Shepherds Bush Empire 25.01.05 (2005)

== Film scores and soundtracks ==
=== Film ===
Year	Title	Director	Studio / publisher	Notes
1998	Pi	Darren Aronofsky	Protozoa Pictures	
2000	Requiem for a Dream	Darren Aronofsky	Thousand Words; Protozoa Pictures	
2001	World Traveler	Bart Freundlich	Alliance Atlantis; Eureka Pictures; IFC Productions; Process Productions	
2001	The Hole	Nick Hamm	Canal+; Cowboy Films; Film Council; Granada Film Productions; Impact Pictures; Pathé	
2001	Knockaround Guys	Brian Koppelman; David Levien	Lawrence Bender Productions; New Line Cinema	
2001	Rain	Katherine Lindberg	Antena 3; Cappa Films; Kinowelt; Lolafilms; Via Digital	
2002	Abandon	Stephen Gaghan	Spyglass Entertainment; Paramount Pictures	
2002	Murder by Numbers	Barbet Schroeder	Warner Bros. Pictures; Castle Rock Entertainment	
2002	Sonny	Nicolas Cage	Gold Circle Films; Saturn Films	
2003	11:14	Greg Marcks	Media 8 Entertainment; New Line Cinema	
2004	Suspect Zero	E. Elias Merhige	Intermedia Films; Lakeshore Entertainment; Cruise/Wagner	
2005	Sahara	Breck Eisner	Bristol Bay Productions; Baldwin Entertainment Group; Kanzaman; Mace Neufeld Pictures; Paramount Pictures	BMI Film Music Award
2005	Doom	Andrzej Bartkowiak	John Wells Productions; Di Bonaventura Pictures	
2006	The Fountain	Darren Aronofsky	Warner Bros.; Regency Enterprises; Protozoa Pictures	Chicago Film Critics Association Award for Best Original Score; World Soundtrack Award – Public Choice; Nominated: Golden Globe Award for Best Original Score; Nominated: Critics' Choice Movie Award for Best Score; Nominated: World Soundtrack Award for Best Original Score of the Year
2006	Trust the Man	Bart Freundlich	Fox Searchlight Pictures	
2006	Smokin' Aces	Joe Carnahan	StudioCanal; Relativity Media; Blinding Edge Pictures; Working Title Films; Scion Films	
2007	Wind Chill	Gregory Jacobs	Blueprint Pictures; Section Eight Productions	
2008	Definitely, Maybe	Adam Brooks	Universal Pictures; StudioCanal; Working Title Films	
2008	The Wrestler	Darren Aronofsky	Wild Bunch; Saturn Films; Protozoa Pictures	
2008	Dream from Leaving	Nathan Cox; Rick Gradone; J.T. Gurzi; Pat Healy; Rich Lee Settle; Caitlin Strom; Eric Watson	wonderwheel, llc	
2009	Blood: The Last Vampire	Chris Nahon	Edko; Pathé	
2009	Moon	Duncan Jones	Stage 6 Films; Liberty Films UK; Sony Pictures Classics	Nominated: British Independent Film Award for Best Technical Achievement
2009	Farewell	Christian Carion	Pathé; Canal+; Ciné+; France 2	
2009	The Rebound	Bart Freundlich	The Film Department; A&F Productions; The Weinstein Company	
2010	Black Swan	Darren Aronofsky	Cross Creek Pictures; Phoenix Pictures; Dune Entertainment	Chicago Film Critics Association Award for Best Original Score; Fangoria Chainsaw Award for Best Score; Nominated: Alliance of Women Film Journalists Award for Best Film Music; Nominated: Grammy Award for Best Score Soundtrack for Visual Media; Nominated: Critics' Choice Movie Award for Best Score; Nominated: Satellite Award for Best Original Score; Nominated: San Diego Film Critics Society Award for Best Original Score; Nominated: St. Louis Film Critics Association Award for Best Music; Nominated: Washington D.C. Area Film Critics Association Award for Best Score; Nominated: World Soundtrack Award for Best Original Score of the Year; Nominated: World Soundtrack Award for Soundtrack Composer of the Year (with Last Night & Faster)
2010	Last Night	Massy Tadjedin	Gaumont; Miramax Films; Walmark Films	Nominated: World Soundtrack Award for Soundtrack Composer of the Year (with Black Swan & Faster)
2010	Faster	George Tillman, Jr.	Castle Rock Entertainment; State Street Pictures	Nominated: World Soundtrack Award for Soundtrack Composer of the Year (with Black Swan & Last Night)
2013	Stoker	Park Chan-wook	Scott Free Productions; Indian Paintbrush	
2013	Filth	Jon S. Baird	Steel Mill Pictures; Film i Väst	
2014	Noah	Darren Aronofsky	Regency Enterprises; Protozoa Pictures; Paramount Pictures	Nominated: Hollywood Music in Media Award for Best Original Score in a Sci-Fi/Fantasy Film
2015	Man Down	Dito Montiel	Mpower Pictures; Lionsgate Premiere	
2015	High-Rise	Ben Wheatley	Recorded Picture Company; Film4; British Film Institute; HanWay Films; StudioCanal	
2017	Ghost in the Shell	Rupert Sanders	Paramount Pictures; DreamWorks Pictures	Composed with Lorne Balfe
2017	Loving Vincent	Dorota Kobiela; Hugh Welchman	BreakThru Productions; Silver Reel; Altitude Film Distribution	Nominated: Annie Award for Outstanding Music in an Animated Feature Production; Nominated: Polish Film Award for Best Film Score
2018	Mute	Duncan Jones	Liberty Films UK; Studio Babelsberg; Netflix	
2018	Happy New Year, Colin Burstead	Ben Wheatley	Rook Films; BBC Films	
2018	Out of Blue	Carol Morley	Cannon & Morley; The Electric Shadow Company; BBC Films; IFC Films	
2020	Rebecca	Ben Wheatley	Working Title Films; Big Talk Productions; Netflix	
2021	In the Earth	Ben Wheatley	Rook Films; Neon; Protagonist Pictures	
2021	She Will	Charlotte Colbert	Vertigo Releasing	
2023	Sharper	Benjamin Caron	Apple Studios; A24; Picturestart; FortySixty; G&T Productions	
2024	Love Lies Bleeding	Rose Glass	A24; Film4; Escape Plan; Lobo Films	

=== Television ===
Year	Title	Showrunner	Studio / network	Notes
2004	CSI: Miami	Ann Donahue	Jerry Bruckheimer Television; CBS Productions; CBS	Episode: "MIA/NYC NonStop"
2011	United	Chris Chibnall	Lipsync Productions; World Productions; BBC Two	Television film
2016	Black Mirror	Charlie Brooker	Netflix; House of Tomorrow	Episode: San Junipero
2018–2023	Titans	Greg Walker	Warner Bros. Television; DC Universe	Theme music & 12 episodes; Composed with Kevin Kiner
2019–2023	Doom Patrol	Jeremy Carver	Warner Bros. Television; DC Universe	Theme music & 13 episodes; Composed with Kevin Kiner
2022–present	Peacemaker	James Gunn	DC Studios (S2 onwards); The Safran Company; Troll Court Entertainment	Composed with Kevin Kiner
2024–present	Creature Commandos	Dean Lorey	DC Studios; Warner Bros. Animation; The Safran Company; Troll Court Entertainment; Lorey Stories	Composed with Kevin Kiner
2025	Playing Nice	Grace Ofori-Attah	Rabbit Track Pictures Studiocanal ITV	

=== Video games ===
Year	Title	Director	Studio / publisher	Notes
2012	Mass Effect 3	Casey Hudson	BioWare; Electronic Arts	Composed with Sascha Dikiciyan, Sam Hulick, Christopher Lennertz & Cris Velasco

=== Short films ===
Year	Title	Director	Studio / publisher	Notes
2002	The Hire: Ticker	Joe Carnahan	BMW films	
2006	The Big Forever	Robert Glassford; Timo Langer	—N/a	
2007	In the Wall	Mike Williamson	—N/a	
2007	The Healing Syndrome	Michael Sheehan	High Tyde Productions	
2007	My Mother	Elaine Wickham	Medb Films	
2009	The Odds	Paloma Baeza	Abbot Vision; Slate 9	
2009	Blue Knight	Mark Anthony	Man of Mistery Films	
2010	Fragged	Devon Avery	—N/a	
2014	A Rose Reborn	Park Chan-wook	—N/a	
2015	Gaslighting	Elaine Wickham	—N/a	
2015	Deathly	Mike Williamson	—N/a	
