= Grebo (music) =

Subgenre of alternative rock

- Stylistic origins: Indie rock; electronic; punk rock; folk; hip hop; psychedelia; pop
- Cultural origins: Late 1980s – early 1990s, Midlands, England

Regional scenes
- English Midlands

Other topics
- Cool Britannia

Grebo (or grebo rock) was a short-lived subculture and broadly defined subgenre of indie rock centred around the English Midlands, particularly Stourbridge and Leicester. Musically, the genre incorporated elements of electronic, punk rock, folk and hip hop music into indie rock. The scene occupied the period in the late 1980s and early 1990s in the United Kingdom before the popularisation of Britpop and grunge.

== Etymology ==
Derived from "greaser", the word "grebo" began being used in the 1970s as a slang term for bikers with long hair. The word was re-fashioned by the group Pop Will Eat Itself that represented a brand of United Kingdom subculture of the late 1980s and early 1990s, largely based in the English Midlands. The scene particularly was centred on Stourbridge and Leicester.

== History ==
Fronted by Pop Will Eat Itself, the Wonder Stuff and Ned's Atomic Dustbin, the bands quickly gained attention: Pop Will Eat Itself's 1989 singles "Wise Up! Sucker" and "Can U Dig It?" both entered the UK Top 40 and Stourbridge briefly became a tourist attraction for young indie rock fans. The seminal albums from the scene were released between 1989 and 1993: the Wonder Stuff's Hup and Never Loved Elvis; Ned's Atomic Dustbin's God Fodder and Are You Normal?; and Pop Will Eat Itself's This Is the Day...This Is the Hour...This Is This! and The Looks or the Lifestyle?. In this period, the scene's bands became fixtures, sometimes headliners, at Reading Festival, sold millions of albums and were frequently featured on the covers of magazines like NME and Melody Maker. Grebo bands were distinct from prior indie rock groups not only because of their broad influences, but their subversion of the twee or unhappy moods of most other bands in the genre, and their pursuit of a heavier sound and aesthetic. The scene came to include the stylistically similar bands of nearby Leicester: the Bomb Party, Gaye Bykers on Acid, Crazyhead, the Hunters Club and Scum Pups. The term has also been used to describe Jesus Jones from Wiltshire.

A younger subset of grebo bands emerged around 1991, who were in turn labelled "fraggle" bands. During this movement, the dominant sound was a style of indie rock that was heavily indebted to pop-punk. Gigwise writer Steven Kline described the style as "filthy guitars, filthier hair and t-shirts only a mother would wash". Prominent fraggle acts included Senseless Things, Mega City Four and Carter the Unstoppable Sex Machine.

== Characteristics ==
The grebo genre was broadly defined, and used more as a name for the Stourbridge scene than as a genre label. For the most part, it was a style of indie rock which drew influences from a diverse array of genres, including electronic, punk, folk, hip-hop music, dance-rock, psychedelia and pop. Pop Will Eat Itself adopted an industrial alternative rock style that combined "heavy metal and hard rock guitar riffs, electro-dance rhythms, samples and rap vocals." While Gaye Bykers on Acid's use of hip-hop and dance beats was considered as "a major innovation in mid-'80s alternative rock," Ned's Atomic Dustbin focused on "the hyper punk aspect" of the movement, relying on "catchy hooks and a dual-bass sound."

Grebo artists and fans sported long hair, dreadlocks and baggy shorts.
