= The Wonder Stuff discography =

- Studio albums: 9
- EPs: 10
- Live albums: 6
- Compilation albums: 4
- Singles: 28
- Video albums: 7
- Other albums: 6

This is the discography of British alternative rock band the Wonder Stuff.

== Albums ==
=== Studio albums ===
Title	Album details	Peak chart positions			Certifications
Title	Album details	UK	UK Indie	AUS	Certifications
The Eight Legged Groove Machine	Released: 15 August 1988; Label: Polydor; Formats: CD, LP, MC	18	—	—	BPI: Silver
Hup	Released: 2 October 1989; Label: Polydor; Formats: CD, LP, MC	5	—	131	BPI: Gold
Never Loved Elvis	Released: 27 May 1991; Label: Polydor; Formats: CD, LP, MC	3	—	94	BPI: Gold
Construction for the Modern Idiot	Released: 4 October 1993; Label: Polydor; Formats: CD, LP, MC	4	—	133	BPI: Silver
Escape from Rubbish Island	Released: 27 September 2004; Label: IRL; Formats: CD, digital download	—	38	—	
Suspended by Stars	Released: 20 February 2006; Label: IRL; Formats: CD, digital download	—	33	—	
Oh No It's... The Wonder Stuff	Released: December 2012; Label: IRL; Formats: CD, 2xCD, 2xLP, digital download	169	38	—	
30 Goes Around the Sun	Released: 18 March 2016; Label: IRL; Formats: CD, LP, digital download	38	6	—	
Better Being Lucky	Released: 8 November 2019; Label: Good Deeds Music; Formats: CD, digital download	—	11	—	
"—" denotes releases that did not chart.

=== Live albums ===
Title	Album details	Peak chart positions
Title	Album details	UK
Live in Manchester	Released: 17 July 1995; Label: Windsong in Concert; Formats: CD	74
Cursed with Insincerity	Released: 4 June 2001; Label: Eagle; Formats: 2xCD	122
Welcome to the Cheap Seats – Greatest Hits Live	Released: June 2004; Label: Music Club/Eagle; Formats: CD	—
The Wonder Stuff Live	Released: October 2007; Label: IRL; Formats: 2xCD	—
Hup Live	Released: June 2010; Label: Nyquest; Formats: CD+DVD	—
Never Loved Elvis Live	Released: 11 May 2012; Label: Nyquest; Formats: 2xCD+DVD	—
Groovers on Manoeuvres	Released: 1 October 2026; Label: Grin Audio; Formats: 2xCD, 2xLP	
"—" denotes releases that did not chart.

=== Compilation albums ===
Title	Album details	Peak chart positions		Certifications
Title	Album details	UK	AUS	Certifications
If The Beatles Had Read Hunter...The Singles	Released: September 1994; Label: Polydor; Formats: CD, MC	8	158	BPI: Silver
Love Bites and Bruises	Released: November 2000; Label: Polydor; Formats: 2xCD; Collection of B-sides and unreleased tracks	—	—	
Live at the BBC	Released: June 2007; Label: Polydor; Formats: 2xCD; Collection of BBC recordings	—	—	
Upstaged – A Live Anthology 1987–2016	Released: March 2018; Label: Good Deeds Music; Formats: 7xCD	—	—	
"—" denotes releases that did not chart.

=== Other albums ===
Title	Album details
The Boot Legged Groove Machine	Released: August 1990; Label: Self-release; Formats: LP; Recorded material for the first two albums that was not included on them
The Eight Legged Groove Machine – 20th Anniversary Edition	Released: October 2008; Label: Self-released; Formats: CD; Re-recording of debut album
Hup – 21st Anniversary Edition	Released: March 2010; Label: Self-released; Formats: CD; Re-recording of second album
The Wonder Stuff Diaries 86–89 – An Audio Teaser	Released: 2014; Label: Self-released; Formats: CD
Never Loved Elvis – The Demos	Released: 2017; Label: Self-released; Formats: CD
Construction for the Modern Idiot – The Demos	Released: 2017; Label: Self-released; Formats: CD

=== Video albums ===
Title	Album details
Eleven Appalling Promos	Released: 1990; Label: Polydor; Formats: VHS
Welcome to the Cheap Seats "The Motion Picture" Video	Released: 10 February 1992; Label: The Far Out Recording Company; Formats: VHS
Greatest Hits Finally Live	Released: 1994; Label: PolyGram Video; Formats: VHS
Construction for the Modern Vidiot	Released: 2003; Label: Secret Films; Formats: DVD
Welcome to the Cheap Seats	Released: March 2006; Label: Universal Music; Formats: DVD
Hup Live	Released: June 2010; Label: Nyquest; Formats: DVD
Oh No It's... The Wonder Stuff	Released: January 2014; Label: IRL; Formats: DVD

== EPs ==
Title	Album details	Peak chart positions			
Title	Album details	UK	AUS	IRE	US MR
The Wonder Stuff	Released: February 1987; Label: The Far Out Recording Company; Formats: 7"	195	—	—	—
Cartoon Boyfriend	Released: 1990; Label: PolyGram; Formats: CD; US promo-only release	—	—	—	—
Welcome to the Cheap Seats – The Original Soundtrack E.P.	Released: 13 January 1992; Label: Polydor; Formats: 7", 12", CD, MC	8	64	9	27
On the Ropes E.P.	Released: 13 September 1993; Label: Polydor; Formats: 7", 12", CD, MC	10	114	16	17
Full of Life (Happy Now) E.P.	Released: 15 November 1993; Label: Polydor; Formats: 7", 12", CD, MC	28	—	—	—
Hot Love Now! E.P.	Released: 14 March 1994; Label: Polydor; Formats: 7", CD, MC	19	—	—	—
Idiot 1	Released: 1994; Label: Polydor; Formats: CD; Promo-only release	—	—	—	—
See the Wonder Stuff on Tour!	Released: 1994; Label: Polydor; Formats: CD; US promo-only release	—	—	—	—
5 Track EP	Released: December 2001; Label: The Far Out Recording Company; Formats: CD; Limited release	—	—	—	—
Napster Live Session EP	Released: March 2005; Label: Self-release; Formats: digital download; Exclusive Napster release	—	—	—	—
"—" denotes releases that did not chart.

== Singles ==
Title	Year	Peak chart positions							Album
Title	Year	UK	UK Indie	AUS	AUT	IRE	NZ	US MR	Album
"Unbearable"	1987	—	6	—	—	—	—	—	The Eight Legged Groove Machine
"Give Give Give Me More More More"	1988	72	—	—	—	—	—	17	The Eight Legged Groove Machine
"A Wish Away"	1988	43	—	—	—	—	—	—	The Eight Legged Groove Machine
"It's Yer Money I'm After Baby"	1988	40	—	—	—	—	—	—	The Eight Legged Groove Machine
"Who Wants to Be the Disco King?"	1989	28	—	—	—	23	—	—	Non-album single
"Don't Let Me Down, Gently"	1989	19	—	—	—	12	—	11	Hup
"Golden Green"	1989	33	—	—	—	27	—	—	Hup
"Radio Ass Kiss" (US promo-only release)	1989	—	—	—	—	—	—	26	Hup
"Circlesquare"	1990	20	—	—	—	—	—	—	Non-album single
"The Size of a Cow"	1991	5	—	51	—	13	—	—	Never Loved Elvis
"Caught in My Shadow"	1991	18	—	28	—	20	—	8	Never Loved Elvis
"Sleep Alone"	1991	43	—	—	—	—	—	—	Never Loved Elvis
"Dizzy" (with Vic Reeves)	1991	1	—	3	14	2	28	—	I Will Cure You (by Reeves)
"Unbearable" (re-release)	1994	16	—	163	—	—	—	—	The Eight Legged Groove Machine
"Better Get Ready for a Fist Fight"	2004	95	18	—	—	—	—	—	Escape from Rubbish Island
"Bile Chant" / "Escape from Rubbish Island"	2005	104	39	—	—	—	—	—	Escape from Rubbish Island
"Blah Blah, Lah Di Dah"	2006	—	—	—	—	—	—	—	Suspended by Stars
"The Sun Goes Down on Manor Road"	2006	—	—	—	—	—	—	—	Suspended by Stars
"Last Second of the Minute"	2006	—	—	—	—	—	—	—	Suspended by Stars
"The Animals & Me"	2009	—	—	—	—	—	—	—	The Eight Legged Groove Machine – 20th Anniversary Edition
"Blackberry Way" / "Save It for Later"	2012	—	—	—	—	—	—	—	Oh No It's... The Wonder Stuff
"Far, Far Away" / "There, There My Dear"	2012	—	—	—	—	—	—	—	Oh No It's... The Wonder Stuff
"Planet Earth" / "Get Up!"	2012	—	—	—	—	—	—	—	Oh No It's... The Wonder Stuff
"Oh No!"	2013	—	—	—	—	—	—	—	Oh No It's... The Wonder Stuff
"Friendly Company"	2013	—	—	—	—	—	—	—	Oh No It's... The Wonder Stuff
"For the Broken Hearted"	2016	—	—	—	—	—	—	—	30 Goes Around the Sun
"Good Deeds & Highs"	2016	—	—	—	—	—	—	—	30 Goes Around the Sun
"No Thieves Among Us"	2019	—	—	—	—	—	—	—	Better Being Lucky
"—" denotes releases that did not chart or were not released in that territory.
