= Camp (2003 film) =

2003 American musical comedy-drama film by Todd Graff

- Theatrical release poster
- Directed by: Todd Graff
- Written by: Todd Graff
- Produced by: Danny DeVito; Michael Shamberg; Stacey Sher; Christine Vachon
- Starring: Daniel Letterle; Joanna Chilcoat; Robin de Jesús; Anna Kendrick; Alana Allen; Don Dixon
- Cinematography: Kip Bogdahn
- Edited by: Myron I. Kerstein
- Music by: Stephen Trask
- Production companies: Jersey Films; Killer Films
- Distributed by: IFC Films
- Release date: July 25, 2003
- Running time: 111 minutes
- Country: United States
- Language: English
- Box office: $2.6 million

Camp is a 2003 American musical comedy drama film written and directed by Todd Graff in his directorial debut about an upstate New York performing arts summer camp. The film is based on Graff's own experiences at a similar camp called Stagedoor Manor, where many scenes of the film were filmed.

Camp was released in the United States on July 25, 2003, by IFC Films. The film received generally positive reviews from critics.

== Plot ==
The film centers on the experiences of several teenagers at Camp Ovation, a summer theatre camp. Shy Ellen Lucas greets her friend Michael Flores, a gay teenager who was violently beaten by his classmates after showing up to his junior prom in drag. Nerdy Fritzi Wagner attempts to befriend icy Jill Simmons, but ends up toting her luggage instead. Returning camper Jenna Malloran laments that her parents forced her to have her jaw wired shut in order to lose weight. The campers are surprised by the arrival of Vlad Baumann, a handsome new camper who is, as a staff member marvels, "an honest-to-god straight boy." The camp enlists a guest counselor for the summer: composer Bert Hanley, whose play The Children's Crusade was a one-hit wonder many years earlier. Frustrated with his lack of recent success, he is now a grumpy alcoholic.

Vlad and Ellen flirt a bit after rehearsal one day. Soon afterward, Vlad is seduced by Jill, who later makes cruel cracks at Ellen for her weight and her inexperience with boys. Feeling guilty, Vlad comforts Ellen and the two begin to inch toward a relationship.

After Fritzi is caught washing Jill's underwear, Jill expresses her disgust with Fritzi and kicks her out of the cabin. Enraged, Fritzi sabotages Jill's next performance and takes her place mid-song, revealing her previously hidden talent.

Vlad convinces Michael to invite his parents to his next play. When they fail to show, Michael flees the stage mid-performance. Vlad reveals to Michael that he has his own hidden problem: Vlad has Obsessive Compulsive Disorder and must take medication to make life bearable.

Hanley gets into a drunken rage and tells the campers that theater will only make them bitter and lonely like himself. Vlad finds a trove of music that Hanley has written over the years but not released. During a rehearsal for the camp's benefit performance, Vlad and the campers sing one of Hanley's songs. Hanley's heart is lifted and his disposition changes.

Shortly before the benefit, Michael sleeps with Dee, Ellen's roommate, out of frustration about his unrequited crush on Vlad. Vlad and Dee end up making out on Dee's bed, and Ellen walks in on them. She runs off, hurt, and refuses to talk to Vlad.

The night of the benefit concert arrives, and the campers are starstruck as famed composer Stephen Sondheim is in attendance. The dressing room atmosphere is tense, and gets even more awkward when Vlad's girlfriend Julie shows up to see him. Fritzi sabotages Jill's makeup, causing her to break out in boils. Jill attacks her, injuring her, and both are unfit to go onstage. To replace her, Bert cuts the wires on Jenna's mouth, allowing her to sing a powerful song directed to her parents in the audience, telling them to accept her as she is.

The benefit is a hit, but Vlad, Michael, and Ellen are still arguing. Vlad admits that he is an "attention junkie" and attempts to please everyone in order to gain their good favor. Vlad explains that he still cares about Ellen and that his girlfriend Julie had just broken up with him. After another apology, Ellen forgives him, and the three go swimming.

== Cast ==
- Daniel Letterle as Vlad Baumann
- Joanna Chilcoat as Ellen Lucas
- Robin de Jesús as Michael Flores
- Anna Kendrick as Fritzi Wagner
- Alana Allen as Jill Simmons
- Vince Rimoldi as Spitzer
- Don Dixon as Bert Hanley
- Tiffany Taylor as Jenna Malloran
- Sasha Allen as Dee
- Eddie Clark and Leslie Frye as Mr. and Mrs. Malloran
- David Perlow as Ben Lucas
- DeQuina Moore as DeQuina
- Steven Cutts as Shaun
- Stephen Sondheim as himself

The film is notable as the film debut of future Academy Award nominee Anna Kendrick, future three-time Tony nominee Robin de Jesús, future The Voice contestant Sasha Allen, and future Broadway performers DeQuina Moore, Steven Cutts, Tracee Beazer, and Brittany Pollack.

== Production ==
The film was produced by Jersey Films, IFC Films, John Wells Productions, Killer Films, and Laughlin Park Pictures. Most of the film was shot on location at Stagedoor Manor camp in Loch Sheldrake, New York, as well as other brief scenes in Manhattan.

== Soundtrack ==
Track #	Title	Show/Album (Artist)	Written By
1	"How Shall I See You Through My Tears"	The Gospel at Colonus	Robert Telson and Lee Breuer
2	"The Beat Escape"	Beat Noir (Fingerprintz)	Jimme O'Neill
3	"Losing My Mind"	Follies	Stephen Sondheim
4	"The Size of a Cow"	Never Loved Elvis (The Wonder Stuff)	Malcolm Treece, Martin Gilks, Miles Hunt, Robert Jones, Martin Bell and Paul Clifford
5	"Wild Horses"	Sticky Fingers (The Rolling Stones)	Mick Jagger and Keith Richards
6	"Skyway"	Pleased to Meet Me (The Replacements)	Paul Westerberg
7	"I'm Still Here"	Follies	Stephen Sondheim
8	"Last Song on Blue Tape"	Son of Evil Reindeer (The Reindeer Section)	Gary Lightbody
9	"Turkey Lurkey Time"	Promises, Promises	Burt Bacharach and Hal David
10	"Praying Mantis"		Don Dixon and Phyllis Glasgow
11	"Imagining You"	Birds of Paradise	David Evens and Winnie Holzman
12	"With You I Do"		Chris Perry and Adam Alexander
13	"And I Am Telling You I'm Not Going"	Dreamgirls	Tom Eyen and Henry Krieger
14	"I Believe in Us"	(Warren Wiebe)	Phil Galdston, Jon Lind, and Wendy Waldman
15	"The Ladies Who Lunch"	Company	Stephen Sondheim
16	"Greensleeves"		Traditional, arr. Stephen Trask
17	"Moving on Up"	Elegant Slumming (M People)	Paul Heard and Mike Pickering
18	"I Sing for You"	(Daniel Letterle)	Michael Gore and Lynn Ahrens
19	"Generation Landslide"	Billion Dollar Babies (Alice Cooper)	Michael Bruce, Glen Buxton, Alice Cooper, Dennis Dunaway, and Neal Smith
20	"Century Plant"	Loose (Victoria Williams)	Victoria Williams
21	"On/Off"	When It's All Over We Still Have to Clear Up (Snow Patrol)	Gary Lightbody, Mark McClelland, and John Quinn
22	"Right On Be Free"	Right On Be Free (The Voices of East Harlem)	Chuck Griffin
23	"The Kitchen Sink (Petie's Top)"		Tim Weil
24	"Here's Where I Stand"	(Tiffany Taylor)	Michael Gore and Lynn Ahrens
25	"Desire"	(The Pedantiks)	Tristan Avakian, Sam Slavick, Sterling Campbell, and John Naslas
26	"Round Are Way"	Wonderwall/(What's the Story) Morning Glory? (Oasis)	Noel Gallagher
27	"The Want of a Nail"	Nearly Human (Todd Rundgren)	Todd Rundgren

The movie notably features a song co-written by Michael Gore, who had previously won the Academy Award For Best Original Song and the Academy Award For Best Original Score (both from the 1980 film, Fame).

The album Camp (Music from the Motion Picture) was released on the Decca/UMG label in 2003. It comprises 14 tracks:

Camp (Music From the Motion Picture)
No.	Title	Writer(s)	Performer(s)	Length
1.	"How Shall I See You Through My Tears"	Bob Telson, Lee Breuer	Sasha Allen, Steven Cutts, the Company	3:51
2.	"Century Plant"	Victoria Williams	The Company	4:46
3.	"Here's Where I Stand"	Lynn Ahrens, Michael Gore	Tiffany Taylor, the Company	4:57
4.	"I Sing for You"	Lynn Ahrens, Michael Gore	Daniel Letterle	2:54
5.	"The Want Of A Nail"	Todd Rundgren	The Company	4:29
6.	"Wild Horses"	Mick Jagger, Keith Richards	Daniel Letterle	3:48
7.	"The Ladies Who Lunch"	Stephen Sondheim	Alana Allen, Anna Kendrick	3:28
8.	"Turkey Lurkey Time"	Burt Bacharach, Hal David	Alana Allen, DeQuina Moore, Tracee Beazer, the Company	3:09
9.	"Skyway"	Paul Westerberg	The Replacements	2:06
10.	"The Size of a Cow"	Malcolm Treece, Martin Bell, Martin Gilks, Miles Hunt, Paul Clifford, Robert Jones	The Wonder Stuff	3:13
11.	"On/Off"	Gary Lightbody, John Quinn, Mark McClelland	Snow Patrol	2:41
12.	"Right On Be Free"	Chuck Griffin	The Voices of East Harlem	3:51
13.	"I Believe in Us"	Jon Lind, Phil Galdston, Wendy Waldman	Warren Wiebe	4:13
14.	"Round Are Way"	Noel Gallagher	Oasis	5:44

A book with the sheet music was also published.

== Reception ==
=== Box office ===
In the opening weekend, the film made $54,294. It came in ranking at #45, showing at only 3 theaters in the United States and averaging $18,098. The film's widest release took place in the UK where it showed in 116 theaters. It ran for 12 weeks and closed on October 16, 2003. It has grossed $1,629,862 since 2003. The film also hit several top 100 charts for films in numerous categories. It is number 96 in the genre of gay/lesbian independent films, 78 for yearly PG-13 movies for 2003, and ranked 198 for the year 2003.

=== Critical response ===
On Rotten Tomatoes, the film has a 64% approval rating, based on 107 reviews with an average rating of 5.93/10. The website's critical consensus states: "Campy comedy that squeaks by on its charms." On Metacritic, which uses a weighted average of critics' reviews, the film has a score of 55 out of 100 based on 32 reviews, indicating "mixed or average" reviews.

Margaret A. McGurk of The Cincinnati Enquirer says "Like the prodigies on screen, Camp powers through its imperfections, with irresistible results." C.W. Nevius of the San Francisco Chronicle said in his review, "There is lots of music and a genuine showstopper when Jenna sings 'Here's Where I Stand' with such emotion that even her hardheaded dad gets the message." In Newsweek, David Ansen wrote, "Camp may not be as slick as Fame, but it's twice as funny and loads more honest."

In February 2025, it topped The Washington Post's list of "The 25 best movie musicals of the 21st century," with Naveen Kumar writing "You don't need formative experience with sleepaway theater camp to appreciate this winning love letter to the joys and mortifications of growing up," and Ty Burr adding "...the characters come alive when they sing and so does the movie — the musical numbers can make you fizzy with rapture."

=== Award nominations ===
Camp received nominations for the following awards:

- 2004, Artios Award for Best Casting for Feature Film, Independent, Bernard Telsey
- 2004, Independent Spirit Award for Best Debut Performance, Anna Kendrick
- 2004, Golden Satellite Award for Best Original Score, Stephen Trask, and Best Original Song, Bob Telson and Lee Breuer (For the song “How Shall I See You Through My Tears”)
- 2003, Grand Jury Prize for Dramatic at the Sundance Film Festival, Todd Graff

== Sequel ==
Todd Graff promoted an Indiegogo campaign in 2015 to fund a sequel. Rather than treat the original as a previous year at Camp Ovation, the plot would frame Camp as a movie filmed on the campgrounds.
