= Escape from Rubbish Island =

2004 album by the Wonder Stuff

Studio album by the Wonder Stuff
- Released: 27 September 2004
- Recorded: 2004
- Studios: Vada, Stratford-upon-Avon
- Genre: Rock
- Length: 37:49
- Label: IRL
- Producer: Matt Terry

The Wonder Stuff chronology
Construction for the Modern Idiot (1993)	Escape from Rubbish Island (2004)	Suspended by Stars (2006)

Singles from Escape from Rubbish Island
- 1. "Better Get Ready for a Fist Fight" Released: 4 January 2005; 2. "Bile Chant"/"Escape from Rubbish Island" Released: 21 February 2005

Escape from Rubbish Island is the fifth studio album by English rock band the Wonder Stuff, released on 27 September 2004, through the IRL record label. The band had broken up in 1994; they reformed in 2000 and had been playing shows sporadically over the next few years. Frontman Miles Hunt began making drum loops in his home studio, and his flatmate, former Radical Dance Faction member Mark McCarthy, added bass over them. An argument between Hunt and bandmate Martin Gilks resulted in the latter leaving, followed by violinist Martin Bell soon after. Hunt continued working on the tracks, recording at Vada Studios in Stratford-upon-Avon in 2004 with Matt Terry producing. The album saw a return to the band's rock sound of their early albums.

Escape from Rubbish Island received generally favourable reviews from critics, some of whom were mixed on Hunt's lyrics, but were receptive to the music. "Better Get Ready for a Fist Fight" was released as the lead single in January 2005, and reached number 95 in the UK Singles Chart. The following month saw the joint release of "Bile Chant" and "Escape from Rubbish Island" as the next single. To promote the album, the Wonder Stuff embarked on tours of the United Kingdom and the United States. The US release of the album, which coincided with the tour in that territory, featured alternate mixes and additional guitar parts.

== Background and production ==
From 1988 to 1993, the Wonder Stuff released four studio albums; the band then broke up in June 1994. Frontman Miles Hunt performed as a solo artist briefly, before forming Vent 414; the other members of the band, guitarist Malcolm Treece, bassist Paul Clifford, and drummer Martin Gilks, formed Weknowwhereyoulive. The Wonder Stuff, with the addition of former violinist / banjo player Martin Bell, and new members Stuart Quinell and Pete Whittaker, reunited for a show in 2000, initially as a one-off. Due to demand, the single gig was expanded to five, and the band continued to tour infrequently over the next few years. Hunt wrote new songs in a home studio that he had built in London with Radical Dance Faction member Mark McCarthy, who played bass, in 2003.

The pair had been sharing a flat with a friend, and Hunt had bought a computer and recording software. In an attempt to learn the software, Hunt looped drum beats, and he asked McCarthy to play over them. Inspired by McCarthy's playing ability, Hunt began adding guitar parts. Over the next two months, Hunt saw an album's worth of material forming; he was aware that the music would be different from that on his two solo releases, Hairy on the Inside (1999) and The Miles Hunt Club (2002). Around this time, the Wonder Stuff's original manager, Les Johnson, introduced Hunt to Matt Terry, a producer who owned his own studio in Stratford-upon-Avon. Terry was friends with Johnson's son, Luke, a drummer in Amen; Hunt had also known Luke since the latter was a young child. Johnson, who lived in California, was visiting his parents; Hunt said he would pay for Johnson's flight back to the US if he could delay it by a week and help record drums for him, which Johnson agreed to.

While this was occurring, Hunt and McCarthy were making frequent visits to Stratford, where Hunt's manager, David Jaymes, was forming his own label, IRL. Hunt played them early versions of songs he was working on, which the label was ecstatic about releasing. By December 2003, Gilks left the Wonder Stuff after an argument between him and Hunt; soon afterwards, Bell left as well. Hunt didn't take Bell and Gilks's leaving seriously, as the pair had threatened to leave on prior occasions, and it wasn't until early 2004, when Gilks asked Hunt to remove his gear from a lock-up, that Hunt understood that Bell and Gilks were not expecting to return. Despite being short a few band members, Hunt focused on finishing the album he had been working on. Recording was held at Vada Studios in Stratford-upon-Avon in 2004, with Terry as the producer, and James Edwards as engineer. Paul Tipler mixed the recordings at Gravity Shack Studios in London, before the album was mastered by Kevin Grainger at Wired Masters.

== Composition ==
Escape from Rubbish Island was a return to the straightforward rock sound of the band's earlier albums, especially their debut album, The Eight Legged Groove Machine (1988). Hunt said that the title was "a statement about the way Britain's gone over the last ten years. Politically, socially, musically, it's just very backward looking." In contrast with their third studio album, Construction for the Modern Idiot (1993), which was about growing up, Escape from Rubbish Island tackled escapism and divorce. Edwards supplied additional guitars, while Terry provided additional backing vocals; Hunt's uncle, Bill Hunt, contributed on the organ.

Hunt wrote the majority of the tracks, except for "Bile Chant" (written by Hunt, McCarthy, and Republica member Jonny Male), "Better Get Ready for a Fist Fight" (written by Hunt, McCarthy, and Male), "Another Comic Tragedy" (written by Hunt and Male), and "Head Count" (written by Hunt and McCarthy). The opening track, "Escape from Rubbish Island", lambasts modern England before becoming introspective, and is followed by "Bile Chant", which features flamenco guitar. "Better Get Ready for a Fist Fight" recalled the sound of Construction for the Modern Idiot, and is followed by "Another Tragic Comedy", which tackles the topic of relationships. "Head Count" is a goth-esque track that incorporates an organ, which was written after Hunt argued with Les Johnson. "One Step at a Time" contains elements of funk; The closing track, "Love's Ltd", has Celtic flourishes, with whistling by Geoffrey Kelly.

== Release ==
A financial backer of IRL proposed to Hunt that he release the album under the Wonder Stuff name. After realising that he had put into the album the same effort that he had with the previous Wonder Stuff albums, he decided to put it out under the name. Hunt invited Treece to join him and McCarthy on tour; Luke Johnson was unable to secure a work permit, and was only able to play a few dates before being replaced by former Love in Reverse member Andres Karu, who had drummed for Hunt previously on The Miles Hunt Club. According to Hunt, the ex-members took over the band's website, criticizing the new line-up as "nothing but Miles Hunt and a bunch of his mates going out playing Wonder Stuff songs. To which," Hunt continued, "I could only ask 'isn't that what it always had been?'" Escape from Rubbish Island was released on 27 September 2004, through IRL. The band toured the United Kingdom until mid-October.

"Better Get Ready for a Fist Fight" was released as a single on 11 October 2004, with "Apple of My Eye" and "Safety Pin Stuck in My Heart" as extra tracks. "Bile Chant" and "Escape from Rubbish Island" were released as a joint single on 21 February 2005, with remixes of both songs as extra tracks. On 1 March 2005, a music video for "Escape from Rubbish Island" was posted online. The band was invited to tour the United States by touring agent Marc Geiger, who ran a label that was interested in releasing the album there. Escape from Rubbish Island was released in the US in March 2005; as Hunt was unhappy with some of the original mixes, he altered a few of them and had Treece add new guitar parts to some of the tracks. Later in the month, the band played a handful of UK shows. In April and May 2005, the band embarked on a tour of the US, with As Fast As.

== Reception ==
Professional ratings
Review scores
Source	Rating
AllMusic	4/5 stars
Stylus Magazine	B−

Escape from Rubbish Island was met with generally positive reviews from music critics, who were receptive to the music. AllMusic reviewer John D. Luerssen wrote that the album "may not match" the quality of their third studio album, Never Loved Elvis (1991), but "it boasts some superb songs in the band's unique indie folk/rock style heightened by Hunt's sorely-needed, wry observations." He added that the album "may be littered with a couple of disposable songs ... but with irresistibly melodic, attitudinal numbers like 'Back to Work' and 'Another Comic Tragedy', the Wonder Stuff still manage to say it all with their moniker." Elizabeth Halvorsen of mxdwn felt that the album was "nothing much to write home about" as the "instrumentals drone on, the same rhythm, riff, or 3 bar melody being repeated too often with no deviation".

Reviews were mixed on the album's lyrics. Stylus Magazine's Bjorn Randolph highlighted Hunt's lyrics: "He's clearly got a hard case of the older/wisers, and the gleeful misanthropy of the classic Stuffies has been replaced with a wistful air, filled with regrets, coulda-beens and shoulda-beens." Patrick Schabe of PopMatters found Hunt's lyrics to be "as wry and bitter and sneering as ever" but found the music to be "missing a piece of the formula that made up the old, familiar Wonder Stuff." Chart Attack writer David Missio said that a few people "will enjoy Escape From Rubbish Island's Bon Jovi/John Mellencamp sound", though the "brash lyrics" make it fall "much too flat to be a successful comeback album". Halvorsen said the lyrics were "lack[ing] in substance".

"Better Get Ready for a Fist Fight" reached number 95 on the UK Singles Chart.

== Track listing ==
All songs written by Miles Hunt, except where noted.

No.	Title	Writer(s)	Length
1.	"Escape from Rubbish Island"		3:32
2.	"Bile Chant"	Miles Hunt; Mark McCarthy; Jonny Male	2:53
3.	"Better Get Ready for a Fist Fight"	Hunt; McCarthy; Male	3:49
4.	"Another Comic Tragedy"	Hunt; Male	3:21
5.	"Was I Meant to Be Sorry?"		3:39
6.	"Head Count"	Hunt; McCarthy	4:05
7.	"You Don't Know Who..."		4:33
8.	"Back to Work"		3:31
9.	"One Step at a Time"		4:03
10.	"Love's Ltd"		4:23
Total length:			37:49

== Personnel ==
Personnel per booklet.

The Wonder Stuff

- Miles Hunt – lead vocals, guitars, keyboards, programming, percussion
- Malcom Treece – guitar, backing vocals
- Mark McCarthy – bass

Additional musicians

- Luke Johnson – drums
- James Edwards – additional guitars
- Matt Terry – additional backing vocals
- Geoffrey Kelly – whistles, flute
- Bill Hunt – organ

Production

- Matt Terry – producer
- James Edwards – engineer
- Paul Tipler – mixing
- Kevin Grainger – mastering

Design

- Tony Bartolo – photography
- Miles Hunt – photography
- Mark McCarthy – photography
- Alan Robertson – sleeve design
