= Suspended by Stars =

Studio album by the Wonder Stuff
- Released: 20 February 2006
- Recorded: 2005
- Studios: Vada, Doghaus
- Genre: Rock
- Length: 48:56
- Label: IRL

The Wonder Stuff chronology
| Escape from Rubbish Island (2004) | Suspended by Stars (2006) | Oh No It's... The Wonder Stuff (2012) |

Singles from Suspended by Stars
- 1. "Blah Blah, Lah Di Dah" Released: 30 January 2006; 2. "The Sun Goes Down on Manor Road" Released: 12 June 2006; 3. "Last Second of the Minute" Released: 23 October 2006

Suspended by Stars is the sixth studio album by English rock band the Wonder Stuff, released on 20 February 2006, on the IRL record label. After touring in support of Escape from Rubbish Island (2004), their fifth studio album, frontman Miles Hunt moved to Shropshire and began writing new songs. Bookending a tour of the United States in April and May 2005, the band recorded songs at Doghaus in New York City and Vada in Stratford-upon-Avon. Hunt missed hearing the sound of a violin, and Erica Nockalls was drafted to add the instrument to several of the album's songs.

Preceded by a four-show tour of the United Kingdom in August and a solo tour by Hunt at the end of 2005, "Blah Blah, Lah Di Dah" was released as the album's lead single on 30 January 2006. Suspended by Stars was promoted with a UK tour in March 2006; in May and June of that year, Hunt played a series of solo shows. "The Sun Goes Down on Manor Road" was released as a single on 12 June 2006, followed by several UK festival appearances. The third and final single, "Last Second of the Minute" (released on 23 October 2006), coincided with a UK tour by Hunt and Nockalls that month. The album received favorable reviews from music critics, some of whom praised the songwriting.

== Background and production ==
The Wonder Stuff released Escape from Rubbish Island in September 2004, their fifth studio album and the first since their 1994 breakup. Long-time members, violinist Martin Bell and drummer Martin Gilks, left earlier in 2004; frontman Miles Hunt continued with a lineup of bassist Mark McCarthy, long-time guitarist Malcom Treece, and drummer Andres Karu. Although it began as a solo effort, Escape from Rubbish Island was released under the Wonder Stuff name at the suggestion of an IRL financial backer. Hunt moved to Shropshire, rebuilt his home studio in a spare bedroom, and came up with several new songs after the initial UK tour in support of the album.

Treece came up with new guitar parts for songs, spurring Hunt to write more material. In early 2005, the band again toured the UK; Hunt missed the violin sound onstage, which left them unable to play several older tracks. Matt Terry (a friend of Hunt's), had seen a woman busking with a violin in Stratford-upon-Avon, and told Hunt about her. Hunt realised that Terry was describing Firewswitch member Erica Nockalls, whom Hunt had met when the Wonder Stuff was playing a benefit concert. Hunt and Terry tracked Nockalls down and arranged an audition; before she finished her first song, Hunt was impressed with Nockalls' playing.

The Wonder Stuff was scheduled to begin a tour of the United States in April and May 2005. Shortly before the tour, the band recorded backing tracks at Karu's Doghaus studio in New York City. Hunt said that he had "on ongoing love affair with the city of New York" since his first visit in 1989, and "it felt like the perfect place to be writing and recording." After the US tour, the band went to Terry's Vada studio in Stratford-upon-Avon; recording was supervised by James Edwards, Karu, and Terry. Paul Tipler mixed the recordings at Gravity Shack Studios in London, and the album was mastered by Kevin Grainger at Wired Masters.

== Composition and lyrics ==
Suspended by Stars channelled the energy of the band's second studio album, Hup (1989), and the rock sound of their fourth studio album, Construction for the Modern Idiot (1993). Its music was compared to the Adventures and Icehouse. The album's title was taken from Downtown: My Manhattan, Pete Hamill's 2004 memoir; Hunt said that Hamill once "asked his mother how the skyscrapers of New York managed to stay standing and she answered him by saying that they were suspended by the stars." The title subsequently appears in the album tracks "Tricks of the Trade" and "We Hold Each Other Up". In contrast to Escape from Rubbish Island, Suspended by Stars was written as a Wonder Stuff album. Hunt was aided by Treece; they had not written together since Construction for the Modern Idiot (1993), their fourth studio album.

Hunt wrote "Last Second of the Minute", "We Hold Each Other Up", "Angelica Maybe" and "The Sun Goes Down on Manor Road", co-wrote "Tricks of the Trade" and "Someone Tell Me What To Think" with Treece, and co-wrote "Say It Ain't So" and "The Popular Choice" with McCarthy. "Blah Blah, Lah Di Dah", "Long Time No See", "Give Us What We Want", and "No One Tells 'Em Like You Do" were the result of jam sessions with Hunt, Treece, McCarthy, and Karu, the first time Hunt came up with material from jamming since his time with Vent 414. Nockalls contributed violins to several tracks.

For "Tricks of the Trade", the opening track, the band asked Nockalls to "think like Brian Eno and layer some atmosphere" on it. Evoking Cheap Trick, Hunt apologizes for mistakes he made in his youth. "Last Second of the Minute" features staccato guitar work in the verses. The bass part during the introduction of "We Hold Each Other Up" is reminiscent of "Beetlebum" (1997) by Blur. "Blah Blah, Lah Di Dah", compared to the Levellers, is about lottery winner Michael Carroll. "Say It Ain't So" has the sound of the band's early albums.

Hunt omitted a long instrumental section from "Angelica Maybe", which Nockalls filled with "wild Gypsy-esque violin solos"; in the song, a man pleads to be intimate with a woman. Hunt wrote "The Sun Goes Down on Manor Road" about the flat he, McCarthy and their friend shared in Stoke Newington. "The Popular Choice" describes the United Kingdom's obsession with celebrities. The uptempo "Give Us What We Want" is followed by the penultimate song, "Someone Tell Me What to Think", with a guitar line which was replaced by Nockalls. The closing track, "No One Tells 'Em Like You Do", incorporates keyboards and violins; its lyrics detail abandonment and loneliness.

== Release ==
The Wonder Stuff played four UK shows in August 2005, and Hunt made a solo UK tour in November and December of that year. On 20 December 2005, Suspended by Stars was announced for an early-2006 release. "Blah Blah, Lah Di Dah" was released as the album's lead single on 30 January 2006. Suspended by Stars was released on 20 February 2006 on the IRL label. It was promoted with a March 2006 UK tour, and the band performed a radio session for Janice Long on BBC Radio 2. Hunt supported Michael Ferentino of Transfusion M on three May 2006 shows of his headlining US tour, and played solo shows in the UK later in May and June. "The Sun Goes Down on Manor Road" was released as a single on 12 June 2006 with an extra track, "Shit Out of Luck".

In July and August 2006, the Wonder Stuff played at festivals in the UK. Hunt played three solo shows in September before touring the UK with Nockalls the following month. "Last Second of the Minute" was released as a single on 23 October 2006. Hunt also released his second solo live album, Interloper Live 2006 (from recordings of his May and June 2006 solo shows) that day. The band again toured the UK in November and December 2006, then going on hiatus as Treece started a family. Recordings from live shows were later released as part of the band's fifth live album, Live (2007), and the live box set Upstaged: A Live Anthology. 1987–2016 (2018).

== Critical reception ==
Professional ratings
Review scores
| Source | Rating |
|---|---|
| AllMusic | 3/5 stars |
| Gigwise | 5/10 stars |
| Melodic | 3.5/5 stars |
| musicOMH | 4/5 stars |
| PopMatters | 7/10 |

Suspended by Stars received generally-favorable reviews from music critics. AllMusic reviewer Tim Sendra called it a "more cohesive album" than its predecessor, demonstrating that the Wonder Stuff "still have a fair amount of the punch and fervor they displayed during their original run." According to Sendra, no matter how "strong the songs might be [...] if they are coated with too much studio gloss and dragged down by uninteresting musical choices they are not going to make much impact." Melodic writer Kaj Roth called the album "truly a nice positive sounding pop record" which "breathes Aussie rock" in a "late 80's style".

musicOMH contributor John Murphy noted that the band "may never hit the glory days again," although it was "heartening to know that The Wonder Stuff have survived 20 years and are still able to release an album which stands up with their best work." PopMatters editor Patrick Schabe found the album a "continuation of the mature Hunt" which exemplified the previous album, "crafting more intricate melodies, but with fewer barbed lyrics." Schabe added that the inclusion of violin on some of the songs was "the element that was most sorely missing from Rubbish Island". Katrina Pierce of Gigwise wrote that a number of its songs "ha[ve] no identifiable chorus", and called the album "fairly boring with nothing that stands out as exceptional."

== Track listing ==
Writing credits per booklet.

| No. | Title | Writer(s) | Length |
|---|---|---|---|
| 1. | "Tricks of the Trade" | Miles Hunt; Malcom Treece | 4:03 |
| 2. | "Last Second of the Minute" | Hunt | 3:27 |
| 3. | "We Hold Each Other Up" | Hunt | 4:51 |
| 4. | "Blah Blah, Lah Di Dah" | Hunt; Treece; Mark McCarthy; Andres Karu | 3:47 |
| 5. | "Say It Ain't So" | Hunt; McCarthy | 3:05 |
| 6. | "Angelica Maybe" | Hunt | 7:01 |
| 7. | "The Sun Goes Down on Manor Road" | Hunt | 3:53 |
| 8. | "Long Time No See" | Hunt; Treece; McCarthy; Karu | 4:09 |
| 9. | "The Popular Choice" | Hunt; McCarthy | 2:26 |
| 10. | "Give Us What We Want" | Hunt; Treece; McCarthy; Karu | 3:04 |
| 11. | "Someone Tell Me What to Think" | Hunt; Treece | 4:06 |
| 12. | "No One Tells 'Em Like You Do" | Hunt; Treece; McCarthy; Karu | 5:04 |

== Personnel ==
Personnel per booklet.

The Wonder Stuff

- Miles Hunt – lead vocals, guitars
- Malcom Treece – guitar, backing vocals
- Mark McCarthy – bass, glockenspiel
- Andres Karu – drums, percussion, keyboards

Additional musicians

- Erica Nockalls – violins

Production and design

- James Edwards – recording
- Andres Karu – recording
- Matt Terry – recording
- Paul Tipler – mixing
- Kevin Grainger – mastering
- Jill Furmanovsky – photography
- Alan Robertson – sleeve design
