= 30 Goes Around the Sun =

Studio album by the Wonder Stuff
- Released: 18 March 2016
- Recorded: October 2015 – January 2016
- Studio: Mockingbird, Stourbridge
- Genre: Alternative rock
- Length: 41:30
- Label: IRL
- Producer: Simon Efemey

The Wonder Stuff chronology
Oh No It's... The Wonder Stuff (2012)	30 Goes Around the Sun (2016)	Better Being Lucky (2019)

30 Goes Around the Sun is the eighth studio album to be recorded by English rock band the Wonder Stuff. It was released on 18 March 2016 through the label IRL. Following a line-up change in 2014, frontman Miles Hunt began writing for the band's next album in early 2015. After a two-month writing hiatus, they began jamming new songs with their sound engineer Simon Efemey at a rehearsal space in Stourbridge, West Midlands. Recording sessions were held at Mockingbird Studio in Stourbridge with Efemey as producer. 30 Goes Around the Sun is an alternative rock album; some of its songs recall the material on the band's earlier releases. Hunt had initially struggled to writer lyrics following writing a book based on his diaries.

Music critics gave 30 Goes Around the Sun generally positive reviews, and some highlighted violinist Erica Nockalls's role in the band. It peaked at number 38 on the UK Albums Chart. The album's release coincided with the Wonder Stuff's celebratory anniversary tour of the United Kingdom, in which they appeared at various festivals. Music videos for "For the Broken Hearted" and "Good Deeds & Highs" were released in August and December 2016, respectively.

== Background and recording ==
In March 2014, the Wonder Stuff frontman Miles Hunt decided the band needed a line-up change; drummer Fuzz Townshend, who became a television presenter, and guitarist Stevie Wyatt, who Hunt thought was not a good fit for the band, left amicably. Around this time, drummer Tony Arthy, who had recorded extended plays (EPs) with Hunter in 2000, left Jesus Jones, and joined the Wonder Stuff upon being asked. In the late 2000s, Hunt came across guitarist Dan Donnelly while he and violinist Erica Nockalls were performing on their Never Ending Acoustic Tour. Donnelly auditioned for Hunt and was promptly added to the band. Hunt began writing material for the band's next album at his home, where he made demo recordings. Simon Efemey, who had first worked with them in 1986, was drafted in to be their sound engineer. After a few shows, Efemey asked if they were planning to make a new album to coincide with their 30th anniversary, and if they were, he was interested in producing it.

While he wrote five songs in January 2015, Hunt struggled for more songs for the next two months. He told Arthy about this and Arthy asked how the band's original line-up had written their debut studio album The Eight Legged Groove Machine (1988); Hunt replied by jamming in a rehearsal space. At Arthy's suggestion, all of the band members met in Stourbridge in May 2015 for three days to write new songs. Efemey visited the band and would sit on the floor, encouraging them band when they experienced creative blocks. They recorded rough versions of the six songs they had written; Hunt worked further on them at his home.

30 Goes Around the Sun was recorded at Mockingbird Studio in Stourbridge, with Efemey as producer; Hunt did not wish to assume this role as he found it exhausting producing their seventh studio album Oh No It's... The Wonder Stuff. The studio was owned by Ross Syner and Harvey Champion, who also owned the rehearsal space the band used. Sessions were partially paid for with money the band accumulated while promoting Oh No It's... The Wonder Stuff, while other funds were raised through the crowdfunding platform PledgeMusic. Arthy had previously worked with the platform, though Hunt was initially uncertain about the idea. Hunt left writing lyrics until the end of the process, and wrote them while staying at a friend's house in Stourbridge. The album took three weeks to record across October 2015 and January 2016; Hunt explained that this was done between live performances and Efemey going out on tour. Syner and Champion served as engineers. Efemey mixed the recordings while Kevin Metcalfe mastered them at Soundmasters.

== Composition and lyrics ==
Hunt found writing lyrics for 30 Goes Around the Sun more difficult than he had for the band's past releases. He said; "So writing this time was harder because writing the book [based on his diaries] meant I could play with words and sentences there were no rules and then the next writing was constrained to rhythm and rhyme". The album's name alludes to the 30th anniversary of the band entering a studio for the first time. About the track "Don't You Ever", Hunt said despite not believing in a deity, he sometimes "can't help but feel that there has been someone watching over me, testing me, judging me". "In Clover" is about the idolization of lead singers of bands. In "For the Broken Hearted", Hunt likens the process of therapy to being machine-like. "Good Deeds & Highs" is dedicated to Hunt's friends Laura and Lilly. In "One Day On (So Far Away)", Hunt contemplate self-improvement while "The Affirmation", the first track written for the album, deals with having a purpose in life.

"Last Days of the Feast" was written ahead of the 2015 UK general election; Hunt was positive that he would witness the "back of the Tory bully boys that had been in charge for too long". "The Kids from the Green" is about a child entering adulthood, for which Hunt took inspiration from his youth. "Weakened" details a situation where Hunt offered relationship advice to someone, despite him not being the type of person to usually do so. With its aggressive guitar riffs and forceful drums, the song resembles "Donation", a track on the band's third studio album Never Loved Elvis (1991). The drum pattern in "Misunderstanding Burton Heel" echoes the one in "Ruby Horse", a track on The Eight Legged Groove Machine. Burton Heel is a character Hunt had planned to include in a novel he was writing. The album's closing track "30 Goes Around the Sun", is an abbreviated version of the Wonder Stuff's history up to that point, and has the same happy mood as "Full of Life (Happy Now)" on their fourth studio album Construction for the Modern Idiot (1993).

== Release and reception ==
Professional ratings
Review scores
Source	Rating
Louder Than War	8/10

30 Goes Around the Sun was released on 18 March 2016. It peaked at number 38 on the UK Albums Chart, marking the band's first chart appearance in 22 years; for all of the members except Hunt, this was the first time an album charted that they appeared. The album was promoted with an anniversary tour of the UK, and was followed by appearing at festivals, including Isle of Wight, Buryfields and Shiiine On, between May and November 2016. A music video for "For the Broken Hearted" was posted on YouTube on 29 July 2016; it shows the band doing dance routines and performing in a garden and inside a house. The EP For the Broken Hearted was released on 5 August 2016, and includes "For the Broken Hearted", "Too Far to Fall" and "Indestructible". A music video for "Good Deeds & Highs" was posted on YouTube on 4 December 2016; it consists of close-ups of the band members performing in front of differently coloured backgrounds.

Reviewers highlighted Nockalls' role in the Wonder Stuff as being one of the album's strongest points. HuffPost's Tim Thornton said Nockalls "shapes much of this album's sound not only with her strings, but with her spot-on backing vocals"; Loz Etheridge of God Is in the TV considered Nockalls' skills to be greater than those of the band's former violinist Martin Bell. Louder Than War writer Paul Scott-Bates agreed, stating that Nockalls' violin saves the album from "bordering on becoming a little too ‘middle-aged-man safe'". He complimented Efemey's production, which he said regularly "reaches pinnacles which would be very easy to fall from", while Etheridge of God Is in the TV viewed album as a "natural successor to Never Loved Elvis than anything the band have recorded since". Thornton felt if listeners are interested in "driven, unambiguously well-crafted alternative rock that isn't cluttered with fake passion or constant references to who the singer texted while drunk last night," there was no better release to find that than this album.

== Track listing ==
All music written by the Wonder Stuff, all lyrics by Miles Hunt.

1. "Intro" – 1:07
2. "Don't You Ever" – 3:51
3. "In Clover" – 3:34
4. "For the Broken Hearted" – 3:11
5. "Good Deeds & Highs" – 4:07
6. "One Day On (So Far Away)" – 3:50
7. "The Affirmation" – 3:37
8. "Last Days of the Feast" – 2:54
9. "The Kids from the Green" – 3:30
10. "Weakened" – 4:24
11. "Misunderstanding Burton Heel" – 3:11
12. "30 Goes Around the Sun" – 4:07

== Personnel ==
Personnel per booklet.

The Wonder Stuff

- Miles Hunt – vocals, guitars, percussion
- Erica Nockalls – violin, keyboards, backing vocals
- Dan Donnelly – guitars, mandolin, backing vocals
- Mark McCarthy – bass guitar
- Tony Arthy – drums

Production

- GRIN – artwork concept, design
- Nick Sayers – band photography
- Simon Efemey – producer, mixing
- Ross Syner – engineer
- Harvey Champion – engineer
- Kevin Metcalfe – mastering

== Charts ==
Weekly chart performance for 30 Goes Around the Sun
Chart (2016)	Peak position
UK Albums (OCC)	38
