= If The Beatles Had Read Hunter...The Singles =

Compilation album by The Wonder Stuff
- Released: September 1994
- Genre: Indie rock
- Label: Polydor
- Producer: Pat Collier; Mick Glossop; David Morris & Richard Willis

The Wonder Stuff chronology
Construction for the Modern Idiot (1993)	If The Beatles Had Read Hunter...The Singles (1994)	Live In Manchester (1995)

Professional ratings
Review scores
Source	Rating
AllMusic	4.5/5 stars

If The Beatles Had Read Hunter...The Singles (1994) is a singles compilation released after The Wonder Stuff's original demise in 1994, which reached number 8 on the UK album charts.

The title referred to a quote (that) “if the writer Hunter S. Thompson had been a presiding influence over The Beatles, then they might have looked and sounded like The Wonder Stuff".

== Track listing ==
1. "Welcome to the Cheap Seats" (2:36)
2. "A Wish Away" (2:30)
3. "Caught in My Shadow" (3:34)
4. "Don't Let Me Down, Gently" (3:02)
5. "The Size of a Cow" (3:13)
6. "Hot Love Now!" (3:13)
7. "Dizzy" (Tommy Roe/Freddy Weller) (3:19) (Credited to Vic Reeves and The Wonder Stuff)
8. "Unbearable" (2:26)
9. "Circlesquare" (3:22)
10. "Who Wants to Be the Disco King?" (2:49)
11. "Golden Green" (3:02)
12. "Give, Give, Give Me More, More, More" (2:49)
13. "'Coz I Luv You" (Noddy Holder/Jim Lea) (3:29) (A cover of the band Slade's 1971 single)
14. "Sleep Alone" (3:35)
15. "Full of Life (Happy Now)" (3:34)
16. "It's Yer Money I'm After, Baby" (2:48)
17. "On the Ropes" (3:54)
18. "It's Not True" (1:58)

== Charts ==
Chart performance for If The Beatles Had Read Hunter...The Singles
Chart (1994)	Peak position
Australian Albums (ARIA)	158
UK Albums (OCC)	8

== Certifications ==
Region	Certification	Certified units/sales
United Kingdom (BPI)	Silver	60,000^{^}
^{^} Shipments figures based on certification alone.
