= South Axholme Academy =

Location
- Burnham Road; Epworth, Lincolnshire, DN9 1BB; England; 53°31′24″N 0°49′30″W

Information
- Type: Academy
- Religious affiliation: None
- Established: 10 January 1961
- Department for Education URN: 137742 Tables
- Ofsted: Reports
- Head teacher: Stephanie Hamilton
- Staff: 69
- Gender: Coeducational
- Age: 11 to 18
- Enrolment: 769
- Publication: Newsletter
- Trust: South Axholme School Trust
- Website: https://www.southaxholmeacademy.co.uk/

South Axholme Academy is an academy school in Epworth, in the Isle of Axholme area of North Lincolnshire, England.

The school is on the A161, next to Epworth Leisure Centre, and is in the North Lincolnshire Local education authority. South Axholme School Trust is operated by the school itself, the University of Lincoln, Bishop Grosseteste University and Lincolnshire Co-operative.

== History ==
=== Secondary modern school ===
The school was planned in the 1950s as Epworth Secondary Modern School. Construction was planned to start, in April 1958.

The school was opened on 10 January 1961 by Lindsey County Council, with seventeen teachers. It cost £155,000, and had nine classrooms with 350 children. The canteen would not be ready in time, and was hoped to open by the end of January. Most of the construction would be finished by 19 February 1961, and the gym by 28 February 1961. The contract should have been completed by the end of November 1960, but the contractors had a shortage of labour. Lindsey county council extended the contract to the end of December 1960. The county architect recommended that the school open at the end of February 1961, but this would mean paying teachers for seven weeks. Haxey Secondary School had closed in December 1960, so the children had to be taught somewhere. There would be 'chaos' if the school did not open in January 1961. Children would also come from Belton, North Lincolnshire. Children from Owston Ferry and West Butterwick were transferred from the North Axholme school.

It was considered being named the John Wesley Secondary School. At a governors meeting, attended by the Rural Dean, the governors all decided to call the school the South Axholme Secondary School. But at a subsequent meeting of the Scunthorpe Divisional Education Executive, which the Rural Dean did not attend, it was, instead, decided to name the school after John Wesley. The local C of E priests were greatly unhappy about the school being given that name. For five months, Scunthorpe wanted to call the school John Wesley, and the school governors wanted to call it South Axholme. In late December 1960, Scunthorpe agreed to the South Axholme name, but were unhappy about the decision, as they wanted to celebrate the history of Epworth.

From September 1964, Epworth children would travel to Crowle for nursing training, and Crowle children (North Axholme Secondary School, which opened in November 1957) would travel to Epworth for commerce and metalwork, and would work with North Lindsey Technical College French was first taught from September 1964.

Plans for comprehensive schools at the North and South Axholme secondary schools were submitted by 1966. The school governors approved the scheme in January 1967, of Lindsey Education Committee, but parents preferred the secondary schools in Gainsborough, and were less happy with going to Epworth.

=== Comprehensive ===
It became comprehensive in September 1968.

There were £115,105 of extensions, built from around 1971.

In 1974 it came under Humberside Education Committee, and in 1996 under North Lincolnshire LEA. Initially it was Epworth Comprehensive School, and afterwards, South Axholme Comprehensive School. In 2000 it became South Axholme Community School with Arts Technology College status.

In September 2010 it gained foundation school status - South Axholme, like many foundation schools (the remnants of grant-maintained schools) belong to a trust, as defined by the School Standards and Framework Act 1998. In December 2011 the school gained academy status. It was then renamed South Axholme Academy.

== Catchment area ==
Pupils closer to Scunthorpe attend the John Leggott College after 16 years of age. Grammar school education is available in Gainsborough (West Lindsey).

== Headteachers ==
- 1961, Keith Jordan
- September 1977, Raymond Brown, until December 1979
- January 1980, Brian Lynch, until July 1990
- September 1990, Malcolm Toms

== Notable alumni ==
- Gina Bramhill, actress
- Erica Nockalls, violinist
- Sheridan Smith – actress
