= Steven Cutts =

American actor, writer, and director

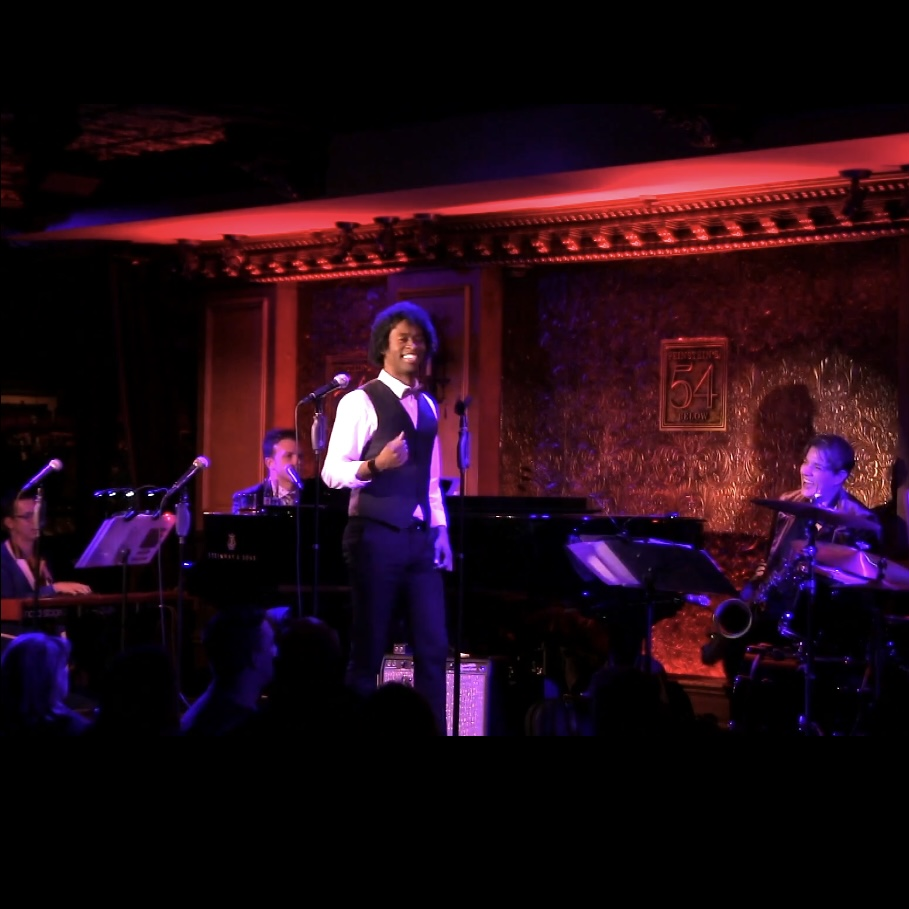
- Steven Cutts performing at 54 Below in NYC, January 13, 2020.
- Occupations: Actor; Writer/Director
- Notable work: CAMP
- Website: www.stevencutts.com

Steven Cutts is an American actor, writer and director best known for the role of Shaun in the musical film Camp, which also starred actress Anna Kendrick.

He appeared in the National Touring, Original Canadian, and Broadway productions of Hairspray. He was described as a "total charmer – especially in 'Run and Tell That'" for his performance as Seaweed at the Boston Opera House in 2005. In April 2015, he performed with actor Tituss Burgess at Broadway Cares/Equity Fights AIDS fundraising concert Broadway Backwards, to a standing ovation. Cutts also appeared in the short film Mother of the Week, which was an official selection of the 2015 Northeast, Orlando, and Big Apple International Film Festivals.

In October 2015, production began on his play Subletters, which starred actress Courtney Reed. In July 2016, Cutts released the e-book My Big Fat Broadway Debut: Volume 1, which appeared on Amazon's Hot New Releases list in Theatre Acting and Auditioning. In 2019 he released My Big Fat Broadway Debut! – The Full Story in paperback.

Cutts directed the world premiere stage production of HAZING U: A Modern Greek Tragedy. The show played the Hudson Guild Theatre, as part of the 2020 New York Theatre Festival. In February of 2023, the production made a transfer to off-Broadway, playing the AMT Theater with Cutts continuing as its director.

In 2023, Steven joined the creative team of Broadway Bares alongside writers Hunter Bell, Troy Britton, Amanda Green, and Lynn Shankel. Broadway Bares: Pleasure Park raised $1,887,014 for Broadway Cares.

In 2025, Steven appeared Off-Broadway in Exorcistic: The Rock Musical, produced by Lance Bass, performing alongside Darren Criss, Evan Rachel Wood, Lena Hall, Emma Hunton, and other notables. Playbill, September 24, 2025.
