= Hup (album) =

Studio album by the Wonder Stuff
- Released: 2 October 1989
- Studios: The Greenhouse, north London
- Genre: Indie rock
- Length: 39:35
- Label: Polydor
- Producer: Pat Collier

The Wonder Stuff chronology
| The Eight Legged Groove Machine (1988) | Hup (1989) | Never Loved Elvis (1991) |

Singles from Hup
- 1. "Don't Let Me Down, Gently" Released: 1989; 2. "Golden Green" Released: 1989

Professional ratings
Review scores
| Source | Rating |
|---|---|
| AllMusic | 3/5 stars |

Hup is the second album by English alternative rock band the Wonder Stuff, released in 1989.

== Song information ==
"Don't Let Me Down, Gently" and "Golden Green" were both released as singles from the album, reaching number 19 and number 33 respectively in the UK Singles Chart. "Piece of Sky" was originally planned to be the next single after "Golden Green", but this plan was abandoned when Rob Jones left the band in December 1989. The promotional video originally filmed for "Piece of Sky" was re-worked (notably with all shots of Rob Jones being removed) and ultimately used for their next single, "Circlesquare", which was written on the same day as "Can't Shape Up"; May 9, 1989.

"Can't Shape Up" was originally much slower and played on acoustic guitar with harmonica. One version featured references to Rick Astley. The slower version was released on the Welcome to the Cheap Seats EP.

"Unfaithful" is the folksy ballad on the album, and does not feature percussion, only strings and acoustic guitar. "Golden Green" was originally a purely electric guitar and percussion song which had Martin Bell's fiddle and banjo added. There was an alternate chorus to "Golden Green" which was not included in the version on Hup.

== Track listing ==
All songs written and performed by the Wonder Stuff except where noted

1. "30 Years in the Bathroom"
2. "Radio Ass Kiss"
3. "Golden Green"
4. "Let's Be Other People"
5. "Piece of Sky"
6. "Can't Shape Up"
7. "Don't Let Me Down, Gently"
8. "Cartoon Boyfriend"
9. "Good Night Though"
10. "Unfaithful"
11. "Them, Big Oak Trees"
12. "Room 410"

=== 2000 reissue bonus tracks ===
1. "It Was Me"
2. "Gimme Some Truth" (John Lennon)
3. "Get Together" (Chet Powers)
4. "Inside You" (Veston Pance)

== 21st Anniversary Edition ==
Re-recordings of the original album together with contemporary non-album tracks, 2010.

1. "30 Years in the Bathroom"
2. "Radio Ass Kiss"
3. "Them, Big Oak Trees"
4. "Golden Green"
5. "Cartoon Boyfriend"
6. "Unfaithful"
7. "Piece of Sky"
8. "Let's Be Other People"
9. "Don't Let Me Down, Gently"
10. "Can't Shape Up"
11. "Room 410"
12. "Good Night Though"
13. "Circlesquare"
14. "Inside You" (Veston Pance)
15. "Get Together" (Chet Powers)
16. "It Was Me"
17. "Our New Song"
18. "Gimme Some Truth" (Lennon)

== Personnel ==
The Wonder Stuff

- Miles Hunt – vocals, guitar
- Malcolm Treece – guitar, vocals
- Rob "The Bass Thing" Jones – bass
- Martin Bell – fiddle, banjo
- James Taylor – Hammond organ
- Martin Gilks – drums

== Charts ==
Chart performance for Hup
| Chart (1989) | Peak position |
|---|---|
| Australian Albums (ARIA) | 131 |
| Canada Top Albums/CDs (RPM) | 89 |
| UK Albums (Official Charts) | 5 |

== Certifications ==
| Region | Certification | Certified units/sales |
|---|---|---|
| United Kingdom (BPI) | Gold | 100,000^{^} |
^{^} Shipments figures based on certification alone.
