= The Axholme Academy =

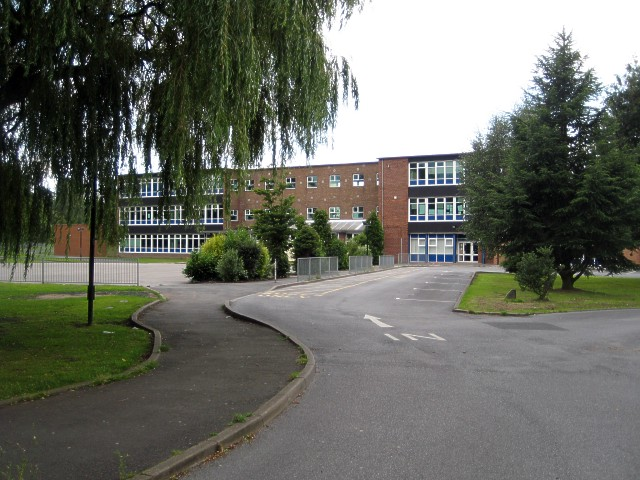
- The entrance in August 2008

Location
- Wharf Road; Crowle, Lincolnshire, DN17 4HU; England; 53.59941°N 0.82867°W

Information
- Type: Academy
- Established: November 1957
- Department for Education URN: 137759 Tables
- Ofsted: Reports
- Principal: Damien Keogh
- Gender: Mixed
- Age: 11 to 16
- Website: http://www.theaxholmeacademy.com/

The Axholme Academy (formerly North Axholme School) is a mixed secondary school located in Crowle, North Lincolnshire, England.

== History ==
=== Secondary modern school ===
In 1949 Lindsey County Council bought 12 acres of land for a new secondary school. It was built by George Chessman Ltd. It took people in the Isle of Axholme north of the A18. Children were transferred from the former Crowle Secondary School.

North Axholme Secondary School opened in November 1957 with 240 children; it was a secondary modern school. It was officially opened Wednesday 17 September 1958 by Frederick Gough, with 390 children and 17 staff. The school had cost £134,000, being built over fourteen months, and was opened three months early. It was hoped that the other Isle of Axholme secondary school (South Axholme Secondary School) would be ready by September 1960. When the school opened, 60 children were from Owston Ferry and 50 children were from West Butterwick. The Haxey and Epworth area went to the other secondary school.

The deputy headmaster was Roy Gillatt who taught Physics, who left in April 1980, when the school was a comprehensive; he had attended Scunthorpe Grammar School, and had flown the Consolidated PBY Catalina across the Atlantic, with the RAF during the war.

The first headmaster was Walter Day, from Norfolk, who moved to the area in 1953 as the head of Fieldside primary school. He helped with the local scouts, and his wife with the guides; he left in 1963 to go to Laindon secondary school in Essex. Harold Dent, Professor of Education at the University of Sheffield, handed out prizes in July 1959.

Leslie W George, aged 40, was the headmaster from April 1963. There was around hundred applicants and six were interviewed. Mr Percy Wickenden, of Althorpe, was chairman of the governors. Mr George was the deputy head since 1960 at a secondary modern school in Cromer, in Norfolk. He had taught for 11 years at Thetford Grammar School, and attended Bishop Auckland Grammar School, and completed an English degree at Durham University. He served in the war from 1941. He was an organist, and wanted to form a school brass band, as he had formed an orchestra when at Thetford Grammar School. His wife was deputy head at the primary school. From September 1963 eleven children were taught brass and woodwind instruments, for a brass band. The county brass band teacher, for Lindsey, was David Haines. Freda McGowan taught music. There was a school choir, with 32 taking part.

A GCE form would be started from September 1963, if there was enough interest. In early 1964 a new teaching block opened, with an aviary.

At the school prize day, on Tuesday 21 July 1964, prizes were handed out by Simon Barrington-Ward, the Chaplain of Magdalene College, Cambridge, later the Bishop of Coventry from 1985 to 1997. Out in the Isle of Axholme, the grammar school system was broadly supported, and the headmaster Leslie George warned about possible changes to the local selective system, if a parent had a child capable of attending a grammar school. The Scunthorpe education division change to comprehensive schools, had originated only from Labour supporters in Scunthorpe, animated at a perceived possible unfairness of the eleven-plus system; rural secondary schools have weathered the change to comprehensive education much better than secondary schools in Scunthorpe, which have not fared well; and apart from the success and renown of the John Leggott sixth form college, much of the rest of Scunthorpe's enthusiasm for the comprehensive system has frequently backfired. Yet it was Scunthorpe that had mostly provoked this change, and not the Isle of Axholme.

The headmaster Leslie George wanted a wider curriculum, and there would be cooperation with South Axholme Secondary School and North Lindsey Technical College. A pre-nursing course, for girls, had started. From September 1964, Epworth children would travel to Crowle for nursing, and Crowle children would travel to Epworth for commerce and metalwork.

Rural teachers, in 1964, wanted Lindsey County Council to keep the Frederick Gough Grammar School, as it was, with no significant change. The Isle of Axholme NUT group wanted the grammar school to stay, as the school was situated outside the Scunthorpe borough boundary. If the Frederick Gough grammar school was included in the Scunthorpe plan, which is what happened, the NUT group wanted a new rural grammar school to be built.

On 2 April 1965 at 11.30am, around 200 children, including some from Crowle county primary, journeyed 26 miles on the last train from Goole to Epworth, on the Axholme Joint Railway. It was organised by teacher Brian Hastings. On the train was the chairman of Isle of Axholme Rural District, Mr RW Fletcher.

On Tuesday 4 January 1966, the headmaster was rushed to Scunthorpe hospital with heart difficulties. In late August 1966 he was told by doctors that he could not be the headmaster, so he was forced to resign. He moved to Blakeney, Norfolk, teaching at Fakenham Grammar School. He was teaching at Fakenham High School by 1984.

The deputy Mr Gillott took over in September 1966. Mr Gillott died aged 81 in July 1999; his wife died in 1983.

A swimming pool, 44 feet by 20 feet, opened in March 1966; in November 1966, ten year old Elizabeth Rustling, of Cross Street, at the local primary school, hit her head on the side of the pool, and got out of the pool, but collapsed and died minutes later in the changing room.

Rev. Donald Eric Cornelius, aged 35, became headmaster in January 1967; he had attended Borden Grammar School in Kent, having been Head of Divinity at Scunthorpe Grammar School for ten years, where he met his wife Ruth. He gained a Bachelor of Divinity from King's College London. He became vicar of Gunness and Burringham in October 1991.

In January 1968 Mr Cornelius joined the Standing Advisory Council on Religious Education. Also in 1968, Rev Cornelius dropped the speech day, and the practice of any school prizes being awarded. 1968 was also the year that the school became comprehensive. Whereas former headmasters were quite sceptical of the new comprehensive system, Mr Cornelius was not, describing it 'not as an experiment, nor taking a chance with children's education, but a chance for their better integration'. His daughter, Joyce, also became a teacher, and his son John. His daughter married a Maths teacher in August 1971. He lived at 17 Glover Road in Scunthorpe. His son John read French and Spanish at Cambridge.

=== Comprehensive ===
The school became comprehensive in September 1968.

In the late 1970s the new county council abolished school uniform, but the North Axholme school retained the policy. After the 1988 Education Act, school governors could set uniform policy instead of the county council, and many schools in the area reintroduced uniform.

In March 1985 Mr Cornelius was ordained as a C of E priest at Lincoln Cathedral.

In December 1991, 13 year old Tim Buttrick, of 11 Hop Close Villas, Althorpe, collapsed at a school disco at 7pm and died in Scunthorpe General Hospital at 9pm; he had a heart defect from birth.

The school swimming pool, after 26 years, closed in 1992. Rev Cornelius retired in August 1993, aged 62, after 27 years as headmaster; he died aged 81 on 25 December 2012.

The new headmaster from September 1993 was Lee Smith, who had attended Brigg Grammar School and the University of Nottingham, teaching German and French. He had two daughters at the Vale of Ancholme School, and lived at Broughton.

=== Academy ===
The school was previously a community school administered by North Lincolnshire Council, North Axholme School was converted to academy status on 1 January 2012 and was renamed The Axholme Academy. However the school continues to coordinate with North Lincolnshire Council for admissions.

=== Sports centre ===
In early 1987 the school was planned to become a joint-use district sports centre, beginning around March 1987. There were 440 at the school in 1987.

== Structure ==
The school is on the west side of the north-south A161, south of Crowle, and towards Ealand, to the south. An electricity transmission line passes east-west, close to the north of the school.

== Curriculum ==
The Axholme Academy offers GCSEs and BTECs as programmes of study for pupils.

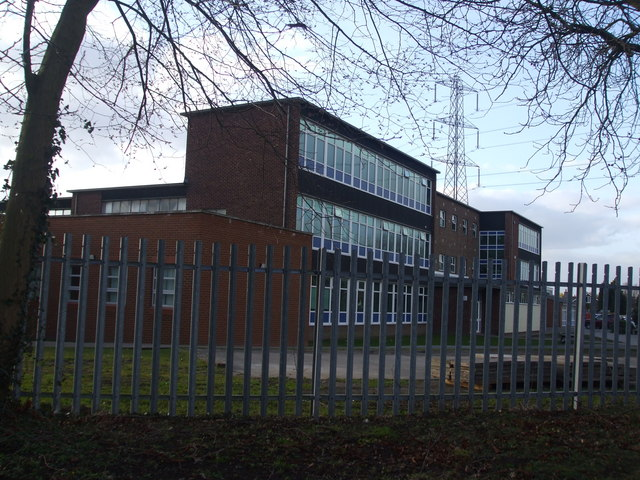
Side of the school in March 2009
