= The Size of a Cow =

1991 single by the Wonder Stuff

Single by the Wonder Stuff

from the album Never Loved Elvis
- Released: 2 April 1991
- Recorded: 1990–1991
- Studio: Townhouse (London, England)
- Length: 3:15
- Label: Polydor
- Songwriter: The Wonder Stuff
- Producer: Mick Glossop

The Wonder Stuff singles chronology
"Circlesquare" (1990)	"The Size of a Cow" (1991)	"Caught in My Shadow" (1991)

Music video
- "The Size of a Cow" by the Wonder Stuff on YouTube

"The Size of a Cow" is a song by British alternative rock band the Wonder Stuff, released in April 1991 by Polydor Records as the first single from their third album, Never Loved Elvis (1991). It was produced by Mick Glossop and peaked at number five on the UK Singles Chart.

== Background and composition ==
Miles Hunt wrote "The Size of a Cow" during sessions for the Wonder Stuff's 1989 album Hup. Described by Select's Nick Griffiths as "Madness meets the Bay City Rollers", the song combines a pessimistic lyric with an upbeat backing, a feature Hunt was proud of. PRS for Music has described the song as an "indie disco staple". A version of the song incorporating a cover of Elvis Presley's "Jailhouse Rock" features on some releases.

== Release ==
Released by Polydor on 2 April 1991, "The Size of a Cow" was the band's first single in 18 months and the lead single for Never Loved Elvis. It received rotation on BBC Radio 1's A list and Capital Radio's B list and peaked at number five on the UK Singles Chart, ultimately spending seven weeks on the chart. In Ireland, the single made number 21. It peaked at number 22 on European Hot 100 Singles. Polydor delayed releasing "The Size of a Cow" in the United States for commercial reasons, instead opting to issue "Caught in My Shadow" as the lead single from Never Loved Elvis there.

== Reception and legacy ==
Record Mirror made "The Size of a Cow" its single of the week upon release, with Peter Stanton's review describing the song as "a rampant jingly-jangly-organ affair that trips at a happier than happy pace". Reviewing Never Loved Elvis in Vox, Keith Cameron described the song and "Caught In My Shadow" as "paragons of pop virtue", noting "huge melodic sweeps, artfully clever lyrics and nagging hummability". Music & Media linked the song to contemporaneous singles by the Milltown Brothers, R.E.M. and Susanna Hoffs in what they heralded "the return of the classic pop tune". Writing in 2017, Jon Bryan of Backseat Mafia described "The Size of a Cow" as "the equal, if not better, than almost any other guitar-pop song of the 90s".

The song remains a staple of the Wonder Stuff's live set, and Hunt's "biggest earner" as a songwriter. Reflecting in 2015, Hunt said "I actually like 'Size of a Cow' which surprises some people because we always have to play it – half of our fans don't like it, half do depending on when they got into us."

== Charts ==
Chart (1991)	Peak position
Europe (Eurochart Hot 100)	22
Ireland (IRMA)	21
UK Singles (OCC)	5
UK Airplay (Music Week)	15

== Release history ==
Region	Date	Format(s)	Label(s)	Ref(s).
United Kingdom	2 April 1991	7-inch vinyl; 12-inch vinyl; CD; cassette	Polydor	
Australia	24 June 1991	7-inch vinyl; CD; cassette	Polydor	
Japan	25 June 1991	CD	Polydor	
