= DeQuina Moore =

American actress

DeQuina Moore is an American actress, best known for her role as Pilar in the original Broadway cast of Legally Blonde: The Musical. She is a native of Houston, Texas.

== Filmography ==
- Camp (2003) as DeQuina
- The Warriors (2005) as Sharla; Krissy; Connie; Wanda
- Rachel Getting Married (2008) as Rachel's Stylist
- Ghost Town (2008) as Young Wife
- Joyful Noise (2012) as Devonne

== Stage credits ==
Year	Title	Role	Notes	Ref.
2003–2004	Little Shop of Horrors	Chiffon	Original Broadway cast	
2004	Hair	Ensemble	Actors Fund benefit concert	
2007	Legally Blonde: The Musical	Pilar	Original Broadway cast	
2010	Madea's Big Happy Family	Rose	Credited as Chontelle Moore	
2013	Flashdance	Kiki	Touring production	
2017	The Bodyguard	Ensemble; Rachel Marron understudy; Nikki Marron understudy	First national tour	
2019	Josephine Tonight	Josephine Baker	The Ensemble Theatre	
2019–2020	Summer: The Donna Summer Musical	Adult Mary Ellen; Diva Donna/Mary Gaines understudy	Touring production	
2025-2026	Some Like It Hot	Sweet Sue	Touring production	
