= The Eight Legged Groove Machine =

1988 studio album by the Wonder Stuff

Studio album by the Wonder Stuff
- Released: 8 August 1988
- Genre: Indie rock
- Length: 36:45
- Label: Polydor
- Producer: Pat Collier

The Wonder Stuff chronology
The Eight Legged Groove Machine (1988)	Hup (1989)

Singles from The Eight Legged Groove Machine
- 1. "Unbearable" Released: September 1987; 2. "Give Give Give Me More More More" Released: 18 April 1988; 3. "A Wish Away" Released: 4 July 1988; 4. "It's Yer Money I'm After Baby" Released: 12 September 1988

The Eight Legged Groove Machine is the debut album by the Wonder Stuff, released in the UK on 8 August 1988. The album cover features a photo of the Keystone Cops and was designed by Hazel Pitt, who worked with the Wonder Stuff on the covers of all of their singles and albums during their most successful period.

== Critical reception ==
Professional ratings
Review scores
Source	Rating
AllMusic	4/5 stars
NME	9/10
Record Mirror	4.5/5 stars

Reviews of The Eight Legged Groove Machine were universally positive. Terry Staunton of NME said that it "possesses a confidence which betrays the Stuffies tender years", and was also "one of the wittiest records you're likely to hear". Staunton singled out "Rue the Day" as the only bad track, "full of wishy-washy sentiments", but overall this is "an album crammed with catchy melodies, hooks and harmonies, which we will return to again and again", concluding "Both naive and knowing, cute and callous, the Wonder Stuff are one of the best pop groups in the world right now. And The Eight Legged Groove Machine is the most complete pop LP since A Hard Day's Night." In Melody Maker, Push compared the album to the excitement of childhood, stating that "the band sculpt a blithe, blistering power-pop for the latest crop of daffodil-headed children", calling the album "a proud, perfect triumph". Eleanor Levy of Record Mirror said, "It's fab, far out and as much fun as taking a bath in a tub of frozen margaritas."

In the US, The Washington Post opined that "this is a great debut by a caustic if-we-knew-then '60s-style foursome, an irresistibly catchy recycledelic album that sounds like a world-weary Romantics—or the Flaming Groovies after 20 years in the coffee generation". Writing for Spin, Tony Fletcher described the Wonder Stuff's music as "a chaotic melee of punk guitars, glam rock hooklines, and soccer terrace chants" and their lyrics "perfectly reflect and taunt the self-centered attitudes that are the guiding principles for success in Thatcher's Britain". He stated, "The Eight Legged Groove Machine asks no questions and offers no solutions. It is simply the welcome sound of four young men kicking their way out of the urban wasteland ... a spiritually uplifting antidote to late-'80s chart careerism".

=== Accolades ===
The Eight Legged Groove Machine was ranked the second-best album of 1988 by the staff of Record Mirror. NME ranked the album at number 19 in their list of the best albums of 1988, while Melody Maker placed it at number 26.

In 1993, staff from NME ranked it as the 27th best album of the 1980s.

== Track listing ==
All tracks composed by the Wonder Stuff.

1. "Red Berry Joy Town" – 2:48
2. "No, for the 13th Time" – 3:02
3. "It's Yer Money I'm After, Baby" – 2:48
4. "Rue the Day" – 1:56
5. "Give, Give, Give Me More, More, More" – 2:49
6. "Like a Merry Go Round" – 2:40
7. "The Animals and Me" – 3:05
8. "A Wish Away" – 2:30
9. "Grin" – 2:58
10. "Mother and I" – 2:24
11. "Some Sad Someone" – 2:47
12. "Ruby Horse" – 3:06
13. "Unbearable" – 2:28
14. "Poison" – 2:58
- Note: Despite not being listed anywhere on the album, all formats of the original 1988 UK release included "Times Will Change" as an unlisted track after "Poison", following 17 seconds of silence. Subsequent reissues of the album list "Times Will Change" as a separate track with its title.

2000 reissue bonus tracks

15. "A Song Without an End" (B-side of "Give Give Give Me More More More") – 4.09
16. "Goodbye Fatman" (B-side of 12-inch of "A Wish Away") – 3.11
17. "Astley in the Noose" (B-side of "It's Yer Money I'm After Baby") – 3.30
18. "Ooh, She Said" (B-side of "It's Yer Money I'm After Baby") – 2.52
19. "Times Will Change" – 0:41

== Personnel ==
The Wonder Stuff

- Miles Hunt – vocals, guitars
- Malc Treece – guitars, vocals
- Rob "The Bass Thing" Jones – bass
- Martin Gilks – drums

Technical personnel

- Pat Collier – producer
- Jessica Corcoran – engineer
- Martyn Strickland – photography
- Hazel Pitt – artwork

== Charts ==
Chart (1988)	Peak position
UK Albums (Official Charts)	18

== Certifications ==
Region	Certification	Certified units/sales
United Kingdom (BPI)	Silver	60,000^{^}
^{^} Shipments figures based on certification alone.

== 20th Anniversary Edition ==
A re-recorded version of The Eight Legged Groove Machine was released in October 2008, featuring the line-up of the Wonder Stuff at the time. This version was self-released by the band and limited to 2000 copies on CD only. A Japanese version of the album included three bonus tracks.

Track listing

1. "Red Berry Joy Town"
2. "No, for the 13th Time"
3. "It's Yer Money I'm After, Baby"
4. "Rue The Day"
5. "Give, Give, Give Me More, More, More"
6. "Like a Merry Go Round"
7. "The Animals and Me"
8. "A Wish Away"
9. "Grin"
10. "Mother and I"
11. "Some Sad Someone"
12. "Ruby Horse"
13. "Unbearable"
14. "Poison"
15. "Who Wants to Be the Disco King?"
16. "Astley in the Noose"
17. "Goodbye Fatman"
18. "Ooh, She Said"
19. "Ten Trenches Deep"
20. "A Song Without an End"
21. "Times Will Change"
22. "Apple of My Eye" (Japanese bonus track)
23. "Safety Pin Stuck in My Heart" (Japanese bonus track)
24. "Shit Out of Luck" (Japanese bonus track)

Personnel

- Miles Hunt – vocals, guitars
- Malc Treece – guitars, vocals
- Mark McCarthy – bass
- Andres Karu – drums
- Erica Nockalls – violin
