= Dizzy (Tommy Roe song) =

1968 single by Tommy Roe

Single by Tommy Roe

from the album Dizzy
- B-side: "The You I Need"
- Released: November 13, 1968
- Genre: Bubblegum pop
- Length: 2:52
- Label: ABC
- Songwriters: Tommy Roe; Freddy Weller
- Producer: Steve Barri

Tommy Roe singles chronology
| "Sing Along with Me" (1967) | "Dizzy" (1968) | "Heather Honey" (1969) |

"Dizzy" is a song originally recorded by Tommy Roe that became an international hit single in 1969. Instrumental backing was provided by the Los Angeles session musicians known as the Wrecking Crew.

Cowritten by Roe and Freddy Weller, "Dizzy" was a major hit on both sides of the Atlantic, reaching number one on the U.S. Billboard Hot 100 for four weeks in March 1969, number one for one week on the UK Singles Chart in June 1969 and number one in Canada in March 1969.

A 1991 cover version by Vic Reeves and the Wonder Stuff reached number one in the UK. The song has also been covered by Bob the Builder (voiced by Neil Morrisey) on the character's debut album in 2001 changing the lyrics to be about the character Dizzy.

== Personnel ==
- Tommy Roe – vocals
- Hal Blaine – drums
- Joe Osborn – bass
- Ben Benay – guitar
- Michael Deasy – guitar
- Don Randi – piano
- Jimmie Haskell – string arrangement

== Charts ==
| Chart (1969) | Peak position |
|---|---|
| Australia (Go-Set National Top 40) | 2 |
| Canada (Canadian Singles Chart) | 1 |
| Ireland (IRMA) | 2 |
| Norway (VG-lista) | 4 |
| UK Singles (OCC) | 1 |
| US Billboard Hot 100 | 1 |
| West Germany (GfK) | 4 |

== Certifications ==
| Region | Certification | Certified units/sales |
|---|---|---|
| Canada (Music Canada) | Gold | 100,000 |
| United States (RIAA) | Gold | 1,000,000^{^} |
^{^} Shipments figures based on certification alone.

== Vic Reeves version ==
"Dizzy"

Single by Vic Reeves and the Wonder Stuff

from the album I Will Cure You
- B-side: "Oh! ... Mr Hairdresser"
- Released: October 14, 1991
- Length: 3:18
- Label: Sense; Island
- Songwriters: Tommy Roe; Freddy Weller
- Producer: Mick Glossop

Vic Reeves singles chronology
| "Born Free" (1991) | "Dizzy" (1991) | "Abide with Me" (1991) |

The Wonder Stuff singles chronology
| "Sleep Alone" (1991) | "Dizzy" (1991) | "Welcome to the Cheap Seats" (1992) |

Official audio
- "Dizzy" on YouTube

On October 14, 1991, a cover of "Dizzy" recorded by English comedian Vic Reeves and alternative-rock band the Wonder Stuff was released in the United Kingdom. It reached number one on the UK Singles Chart and remained there for two weeks. It was a number three hit in Australia and also charted in Austria, Ireland and New Zealand. This version added another key change to the 11 that already existed (from F major to G major).

The music video features Reeves and the band performing on stage with a row of washing machines and microwave ovens in the background instead of amplifiers. Reeves' comedy partner Bob Mortimer appears in the background with the Wonder Stuff's Miles Hunt playing a tambourine and singing backing vocals.

Reeves and the band, together with Mortimer, performed the song on BBC's Top of the Pops on October 24, 1991.

=== Charts ===
==== Weekly charts ====
| Chart (1991–1992) | Peak position |
|---|---|
| Australia (ARIA) | 3 |
| Austria (Ö3 Austria Top 40) | 14 |
| Europe (Eurochart Hot 100) | 6 |
| Europe (European Hit Radio) | 23 |
| Ireland (IRMA) | 2 |
| Luxembourg (Radio Luxembourg) | 1 |
| New Zealand (Recorded Music NZ) | 28 |
| UK Singles (Official Charts) | 1 |
| UK Airplay (Music Week) | 1 |

==== Year-end charts ====
| Chart (1991) | Position |
|---|---|
| UK Singles (OCC) | 8 |

| Chart (1992) | Position |
|---|---|
| Australia (ARIA) | 49 |

=== Certifications ===
| Region | Certification | Certified units/sales |
|---|---|---|
| Australia (ARIA) | Gold | 35,000^{^} |
| United Kingdom (BPI) | Silver | 200,000^{^} |
^{^} Shipments figures based on certification alone.

=== Release history ===
| Region | Date | Format(s) | Label(s) | Ref. |
|---|---|---|---|---|
| United Kingdom | October 14, 1991 | 7-inch vinyl; 12-inch vinyl | Sense; Island | |
| Australia | January 13, 1992 | CD; cassette | Island | |
