= Rob Jones (musician) =

British musician

Rob "The Bass Thing" Jones
- Born: 14 February 1964; Kingswinford, Staffordshire, England
- Died: 31 July 1993 (aged 29) New York City, New York, United States
- Occupation: Bass player
- Years active: 1985–1990
- Formerly of: The Wonder Stuff, The Bridge & Tunnel Crew.

Rob Jones (14 February 1964 – 31 July 1993), known by his nickname The Bass Thing, or by some as Bob Jones, was an English musician. He was a founding member and original bassist for The Wonder Stuff, based in Stourbridge (West Midlands, England).

Jones was born in Kingswinford, near Dudley, West Midlands in 1964. He joined Miles Hunt, Malcolm Treece, and Martin Gilks to form the Wonder Stuff in March 1986 and recorded the singles "A Wonderful Day" and "Red Berry Joy Town".

Jones played on the debut album The Eight Legged Groove Machine and the follow-up Hup. Following disagreements within the group, he left in December 1989, as soon as the group had played the final night of a sellout three-night residency at Birmingham's Aston Villa Leisure Centre. He then moved to New York.

A first marriage evidently ended at an earlier point. Jones married Jessica Ronson who, under her previous name, Michelle Robison, had been the last girlfriend of Sid Vicious. She was known subsequently as Jessica Ronson-Jones.

In New York, Jones formed another band, Rob and Jessi Jones' Bridge and Tunnel Crew. He sang, played rhythm guitar and shared songwriting duties with his wife.

He died in New York on 31 July 1993, aged 29. The cause of his death is variously recorded as due to heart problems, heart attack, potentially caused by heroin, or drug-related causes. He was survived by his mother Mary, brother Trevor, and wife. His body was cremated and ashes were scattered at a number of locations: close to the Statue of Liberty and Ellis Island, near the Parachute Drop at Coney Island and in a flowerbed by the swimming pool at Tammy Wynette's house.
