= Never Loved Elvis =

Studio album by the Wonder Stuff
- Released: 27 May 1991
- Recorded: 1990–1991
- Studio: Townhouse Studios, London
- Genre: Indie rock
- Length: 44:50
- Label: Polydor
- Producer: Mick Glossop

The Wonder Stuff chronology
Hup (1989)	Never Loved Elvis (1991)	Construction for the Modern Idiot (1993)

Singles from Never Loved Elvis
- 1. "The Size of a Cow" Released: 1991; 2. "Caught in My Shadow" Released: 1991; 3. "Sleep Alone" Released: 1991; 4. "Welcome to the Cheap Seats" Released: 1992

Professional ratings
Review scores
Source	Rating
AllMusic	4.5/5 stars
Drowned in Sound	10/10

Never Loved Elvis is the third album by the Wonder Stuff released in 1991. Guest musicians on the album include Kirsty MacColl and Linda McRae.

The song "Mission Drive" was inspired by Wonder Stuff singer Miles Hunt's fall out with best friend and former flatmate Clint Mansell of Pop Will Eat Itself.

The most successful single from the album, "The Size of a Cow", reached No. 5 on the UK singles chart. The album peaked at No. 3 on the albums chart.

== Track listing ==
All tracks composed by The Wonder Stuff; except where indicated

Never Loved Elvis track listing
No.	Title	Length
1.	"Mission Drive"	4:11
2.	"Play"	2:47
3.	"False Start"	0:47
4.	"Welcome to the Cheap Seats"	2:54
5.	"The Size of a Cow"	3:13
6.	"Sleep Alone"	3:50
7.	"Donation"	3:43
8.	"Inertia"	4:07
9.	"Maybe"	4:13
10.	"Grotesque"	1:58
11.	"Here Comes Everyone"	3:55
12.	"Caught in My Shadow"	3:48
13.	"38 Line Poem"	5:24
Total length:		44:50

2000 reissue bonus tracks
No.	Title	Writer(s)	Length
14.	"The Takin' Is Easy"	Rob Jones	2:36
15.	"Will the Circle Be Unbroken" (featuring Spirit of the West)	A.P. Carter	4:00
16.	"That's Entertainment"	Paul Weller	3:23
17.	"Me, My Mum, My Dad, My Brother"		2:39

== Personnel ==
- Miles Hunt – vocals, guitar, harmonica, percussion
- Malcolm Treece – guitar, vocals
- Paul Clifford – bass
- Martin Gilks – drums, percussion
- Martin Bell – fiddle, banjo, guitar, accordion, piano
- Kirsty MacColl – backing vocals on "Welcome to the Cheap Seats"
- Linda McRae – accordion on "Welcome to the Cheap Seats"
- James Taylor – Hammond organ
- Judith Fleet – cello
- Elly Newton, Alison Gabriel – violin

== Charts ==
Chart performance for Never Loved Elvis
Chart (1991)	Peak position
Australian Albums (ARIA)	94
UK Albums (Official Charts)	3

== Certifications ==
Region	Certification	Certified units/sales
United Kingdom (BPI)	Gold	100,000^{^}
^{^} Shipments figures based on certification alone.
