= Construction for the Modern Idiot =

Studio album by the Wonder Stuff
- Released: 4 October 1993
- Recorded: Spring–Summer 1993
- Studio: Greenhouse
- Genre: Indie rock
- Label: Polydor
- Producer: Pat Collier

The Wonder Stuff chronology
Never Loved Elvis (1991)	Construction for the Modern Idiot (1993)	If The Beatles Had Read Hunter...The Singles (1994)

Singles from Construction for the Modern Idiot
- 1. "On the Ropes" Released: 1993; 2. "Full of Life (Happy Now)" Released: 1993; 3. "Hot Love Now" Released: 1994

Professional ratings
Review scores
Source	Rating
AllMusic	2/5 stars

Construction for the Modern Idiot is the Wonder Stuff's fourth album, released in October 1993, and their last studio album before their split on 15 July 1994. The album was a UK Top 5 Album (No. 4) which yielded 3 UK hit singles, of which "On the Ropes (EP)" made the Top 10 (No. 10) and "Hot Love Now" (No. 19) and "Full of Life (Happy Now)" No. 29 both made it inside the Top 30.

The album was dedicated to the memory of Rob "The Bass Thing" Jones, the band's original bassist who died from a heart attack in New York soon after leaving the band. It was released as Polydor 519894-2.

== Artwork ==
Much of the artwork came from 1960s photographs of a space observation project at Oakmead School in Bournemouth.

The person featured on the album cover is Peter Johnson - Head of Geography at Oakmead School for Boys, Duck Lane Bournemouth later to become its Deputy Head. This invention won for Peter Johnson an FRGS (Fellow of the Royal Geographical Society).

After the album was released the machine was rediscovered in a science storeroom at Oakmead School and started to be used again in science lessons.

== Track listing ==
All songs written by the Wonder Stuff; all lyrics composed by Miles Hunt

1. "Change Every Light Bulb"
2. "I Wish Them All Dead"
3. "Cabin Fever"
4. "Hot Love Now!"
5. "Full of Life (Happy Now)"
6. "Storm Drain"
7. "On the Ropes"
8. "Your Big Assed Mother"
9. "Swell"
10. "A Great Drinker"
11. "Hush"
12. "Sing the Absurd" (includes unlisted track; "Something for Sammy")

=== 2000 Reissue bonus tracks ===
1. Hank and John"
2. "Closer to Fine" (Emily Saliers)
3. "I Think I Must've Had Something Really Useful to Say"
4. "Room 512, All the News That's Fit to Print"

== Personnel ==
- Miles Hunt - voice, guitar, harmonica
- Malc Treece - guitar, voice
- Paul Clifford - bass guitar
- Martin Gilks - drums, percussion
- Martin Bell - fiddle, accordion, mandolin, guitar, sitar, keyboards, brass arrangements
- Pete Whittaker - piano, Hammond organ, mellotron, additional keyboards, brass arrangements
- Nigel Hitchcock - saxophone
- Steve Sidwell - trumpet
- Neil Sidwell - trombone
- Paul Pritchard - French horn

== Charts ==
Chart performance for Construction for the Modern Idiot
Chart (1993)	Peak position
Australian Albums (ARIA)	133
UK Albums (OCC)	4

== Certifications ==
Region	Certification	Certified units/sales
United Kingdom (BPI)	Silver	60,000^{^}
^{^} Shipments figures based on certification alone.
