= Radical Dance Faction =

British punk, dub, and ska band

Radical Dance Faction (RDF), originally known as Military Surplus, are a music group with punk, dub and ska styling, originally formed in Hungerford, Berkshire, England by singer Chris Bowsher, the group's only ever-present. They were active between 1987 and 1995 with a constantly changing line-up, with over 30 musicians passing through, releasing three albums.

They first reformed in 2006, going on to perform more live appearances and record two further albums.

== History ==
Radical Dance Faction (RDF) were founded by Chris Bowsher in Hungerford in 1987. Originally known as Military Surplus, the band have experienced many line up changes, with at least thirty different people having been part of the band at one time or another. Bowsher is the only person who has been in every line up of the band.

RDF's music combines punk, dub, and ska, while Bowsher's lyrics, spoken rather than sung, deal mainly with political issues, such as the Tiananmen Square protests of 1989 in the song "Chinese Poem". Bowsher also witnessed first hand the Hungerford massacre, describing his experience in the song "Hot on the Wire".

In 1990, they signed to Southern Records, releasing two albums on their own imprint Earthzone and going on to tour Germany and other parts of Europe. One tour was as the support act to Rebel MC and they also supported Ziggy Marley. RDF appeared at the huge Summerjam festival in Germany, in July 1993.

RDF were a regular act on the UK free festival scene prior to the 1994 Criminal Justice Act, and were part of the crusty/anarcho punk movement, until they called it day in the mid-1990s. Their final album (until reformation) Raggamuffin Statement was a mixture of live recordings and remixes with new songs, including "Martin Foran", about the wrongly convicted prisoner.

The band reformed in 2006, playing various festivals around the UK during 2007. They reformed again in 2012 and appeared at the Bearded Theory Festival in Derby. The band commenced a short tour in October 2012 to promote new album - Ammunition. In recent years, they have performed at Glastonbury, Boomtown, Rebellion, Willow Man and Green Gathering festivals.

In 2018 RDF released their latest work, Daydream Dystopia, produced by Youth Sounds.

== Related bands ==
- Steve Swann, one of RDF's original line-up, co-founded the Revolutionary Dub Warriors and was a member of the reformed, dub/ska band Dub The Earth.
- Phil left RDF in 1995, and together with other ex-RDF members and John from AOS3, formed P.A.I.N.
- Linda and Graham Spey went on to form the band DF118.
- Mark McCarthy joined The Wonder Stuff in 2004.
- Murph joined The Rhythmites.
- Bowsher released an album, Infinitive Splits, in 2010 billed as Chris Bowsher and The Faction, with Martin Jenkins and Oisin Meehan - including versions of RDF songs.

== Current lineup (2023) ==
- Chris Bowsher (vocals)
- Ben (Drums)
- Angus Duprey (Bass)
- David 'Frag' Fletcher (Guitar)
- Karen (Backing Vocals)
- Danni (Backing Vocals)

== Past members ==
- Linda Goodman (vocals)
- Steve Swann (vocals, bass)
- Fred Johnson (bass)
- Karen Woodhead (backing vocals)
- Graham Usher (drums)
- Sid Wobble (harmonica)
- Mark McCarthy (bass)
- Richard Paterson (keyboards)
- Phil Astronaut (guitar)
- Mike Cooper (guitar)
- Sarah Edwards (violin)
- Tim Hill (saxophone)
- Kevin Vernon (percussion)
- Paul McCabe (keyboards)
- Brian Powell (guitar, bass)
- Style Scott (drums)
- Graham Spey (keyboards)
- Jim Warne (guitar)
- Danny (drums)
- Ozzy (bass)
- Chris Chescoe (drums)
- Olly Thomas (drums)
- Lewis Sykes (bass)
- Jimmy Peters (keyboards)
- Andy (from Newcastle) (drums)
- Lynn Forte (drums)
- Spot Gaffey (drums)
- Matty Mann (bass)
- Karen Ricketts (backing vocals)
- Martin Jenkins (keyboards)
- Ben King (keyboards)
- Luke Winton (drums)
- Josh Bannerman (drums)
- Shanks (Drums)
- Murph (Guitar)
- Dan Foster (Bass)

== Discography ==
=== Albums ===
- Taking Refuge (1989) (mini-album, cassette only)
- Hot on the Wire (1989) (mini album, cassette only)
- Borderline Cases (1990) (Earthzone, LP/CD)
- Wasteland (1991) (Earthzone, LP/CD/MC)
- Raggamuffin Statement (1995) (Inna State, LP/CD/MC)
- Ammunition (2012) (LP/CD/DD)
- Daydream Dystopia (2018) (CD)
- Welcome to the edge (2023) (LP/CD)

=== Singles ===
- "Landing Party" 12" (1991)
- "Beast in the Doorway" 12"/CD (1994)
