= The Wonder Stuff =

British alternative rock band

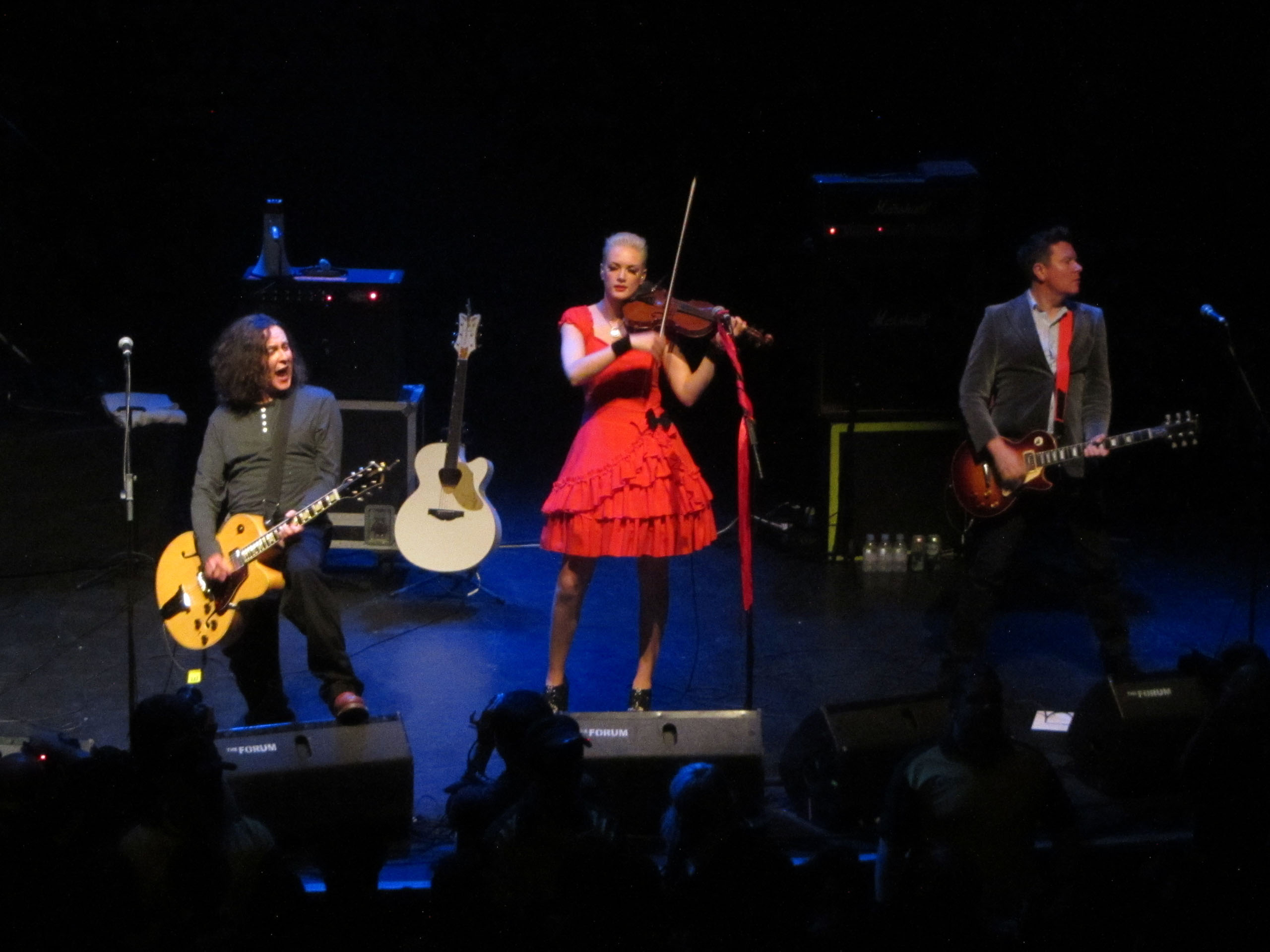
- The Wonder Stuff performing in 2015

Background information
- Origin: Stourbridge, West Midlands, England
- Genres: Alternative rock, grebo
- Years active: 1986–1994, 2000–present
- Label: Polydor
- Members: Miles Hunt; Mark Thwaite; Erica Nockalls; Pete Howard; Malc Treece; Tim Sewell
- Past members: Rob "The Bass Thing" Jones; Martin Gilks; Paul Clifford; Martin Bell; Stuart Quinell; Andres Karu; Fuzz Townshend; Stevie Wyatt; Dan Donnelly; Tony Arthy; Mark McCarthy
- Website: www.thewonderstuff.co.uk

The Wonder Stuff are a British alternative rock band. Originally based in Stourbridge in the West Midlands, England, the band's first lineup released four albums and nearly 20 singles and EPs, enjoying considerable chart and live success in the UK. The band have continued to tour and record since 2000.

Largely the vehicle for the songwriting of Miles Hunt, the band split up with a farewell performance as headliners of the 1994 Phoenix Festival, but reformed in 2000 and have toured and recorded since then, with Hunt the anchor member of all line-ups.

Known for their catchy songs and Hunt's sharp lyrics, the band's sound evolved from guitar pop to include sampling and elements of folk and country. The band - and Hunt in particular — were favourites of the UK music press, and were often associated with fellow Black Country acts Ned's Atomic Dustbin and Pop Will Eat Itself, with whom they have toured throughout their careers.

The band scored one UK number 1 single, their release of "Dizzy" with comedian Vic Reeves, 17 top-20 single hits, and three top-10 albums in the UK. The band also toured internationally, and achieved some success in the United States, where they had six songs on the Billboard Alternative Songs Chart.

== History ==
=== Origins and The Eight Legged Groove Machine (1986–1989) ===
The original line-up of Miles Hunt (whose uncle Bill Hunt was keyboard player with ELO and Wizzard) on vocals and guitar; Malcolm Treece on guitar and vocals; bassist Rob "The Bass Thing" Jones (died July 1993); and Martin Gilks (died April 2006) on drums grew from Hunt and Treece's collaboration with future members of Pop Will Eat Itself in a band called From Eden that featured Hunt on drums.

The Wonder Stuff were formed on 19 March 1986 (their name reportedly came from a remark made about a very young Hunt by John Lennon) and in September that year recorded a self-financed debut EP, A Wonderful Day. After finding management with Birmingham promoter Les Johnson and signing with Polydor Records for £80,000 in 1987, the group released a series of singles including "Unbearable", "Give Give Give, Me More More More", "A Wish Away" and "It's Yer Money I'm After Baby" (their first Top 40 entry) that featured on their debut album The Eight Legged Groove Machine, which was released in August 1988 (UK No. 18). This preceded a first headlining nineteen-date national tour, 'Groovers on Manoeuvres'.

A non-album single, "Who Wants to Be the Disco King?" was released in March 1989 and was followed by UK, European, and United States tours and appearances at the Reading and Glastonbury festivals.

Melody Maker made The Eight Legged Groove Machine one of their albums of the year for 1988, judging it, "A rollicking debut from the only band with enough wit, energy, charisma and acumen to cross over from loutish grebo into raffish pop."

=== Hup (1989–1990) ===
In September 1989, "Don't Let Me Down, Gently", with its slick, American-shot video, became the Wonder Stuff's first Top-20 hit, heralding the release of second album, Hup, in October (UK No. 5). The album saw the introduction of new band member, Martin Bell, a multi-instrumentalist who contributed violin and banjo, most notably on "Golden Green" (the second single from the album), "Unfaithful" and "Cartoon Boyfriend". Several shows during the band's 1989 tour featured fellow Black Country acts Ned's Atomic Dustbin and The Sandkings as opening acts.

Jones left the band in December 1989, moving to the United States.

A single, "Circlesquare", was released shortly afterwards, just before Paul Clifford replaced Jones on the bass in the Spring of 1990. This led to a string of live outings for the renewed line-up in mid-1990.

With only one single release in 1990 and no album yet ready, the band put out Eleven Appalling Promos, a collection of video promos, with home video footage showing Hunt, Treece and Gilks giving their (usually critical) commentary between each song. In December the group celebrated their Brit Award nomination by turning down an invitation to the awards show at Wembley Arena, to play at Minsthorpe High School in South Elmsall in response to a fan's letter: a cover version of John Lennon's "Gimme Some Truth", recorded at the show, was included on the "Caught in My Shadow" single.

=== Never Loved Elvis and chart success (1990–1992) ===
Recording for a third album was started in late 1990 and completed early the following year. The first single from the new album was "The Size of a Cow". Released in March 1991 it became the band's first Top-10 hit, reaching No. 5, (and being nominated for a Brit Award for its video). It was swiftly followed by "Caught in My Shadow" (UK No. 18) in May, before the release of the album Never Loved Elvis in May 1991 (UK No. 3).

After the album release, the band performed a first headlining stadium show at Walsall's Bescot Stadium, attracting 18,000 fans, before embarking on a world tour taking in the UK, Europe and the US. For the tour, the band was augmented by keyboardist Peter Whittaker.

Just after the third single from the album, "Sleep Alone" in September, the group scored a commercial success when they covered Tommy Roe's "Dizzy" with Vic Reeves in 1991, reaching the top of the UK Singles Chart for two weeks in November. The band carried on touring into 1992. They released the single "Welcome to the Cheap Seats" (UK No. 8) in February, which was also the title of their video rockumentary released that Spring after eighteen months of filming on the road with the band.

Touring continued through the latter part of the year, with more dates in the United States (both as headliners and supporting Siouxsie and the Banshees) backed by an appearance on Late Night with David Letterman, performing "Welcome to the Cheap Seats". A further UK tour was complemented with a headlining slot at the 1992 Reading Festival.

=== Construction for the Modern Idiot (1993–1994) ===
After previewing their new material at a few European summer festivals, a new single "On the Ropes" (UK No. 10) was released in September 1993 followed by the album Construction for the Modern Idiot in October 1993 (UK No. 4). Another single "Full of Life (Happy Now)" came out just before Christmas. The band toured Europe before going to the United States in February 1994. A third single "Hot Love Now" (UK No. 19) was released in time for the UK tour in March and, by the time the tour - called 'Idiot Manoeuvres' - came to an end, it was the longest in the band's history with seventy eight dates since the album's release.

=== Band split and solo projects (1994–2000) ===
A planned tour of the Far East and Australia in May was cancelled. The band made no public announcement at that time but a split was announced in June in a fanclub newsletter.

The Wonder Stuff performed the final contracted show on 15 July 1994 as headliners at the Phoenix Festival near Stratford-on-Avon in front of an audience of 30,000. In September, an 18-song compilation If The Beatles Had Read Hunter...The Singles (UK No. 8), a re-issue of the "Unbearable" single (UK No. 16), and a video of their farewell performance from July were released. The Live in Manchester album (recorded in December 1991) was released in July 1995.

During the hiatus between 1994 and 2000, Hunt was involved in several projects. He hosted MTV Europe's 120 Minutes show. He then put together another band, Vent 414, with ex-Senseless Things bassist Morgan Nicholls and later Clash, Eat and Wonder Stuff drummer Peter Howard. They released a self-titled debut album in October 1996, but were soon dropped by Polydor prior to the release of the second album. Hunt started to tour as a solo artist, travelling to the US with Malc Treece, and releasing two albums: Miles Across America, an album of new material, Wonder Stuff tracks and Vent 414 material all reworked for the acoustic guitar, and a live acoustic album By the Time I Got to Jersey (1998). A full studio album, Hairy on the Inside (again featuring Treece and another fellow Wonder Stuff member Martin Bell) was released in April 1999, followed by The Miles Hunt Club in April 2002.

Meanwhile, Treece, Clifford and Gilks formed We Know Where You Live (originally titled WeKnowWhereYouLive), with Ange Dolittle from Eat. They gigged extensively throughout 1995 and 1996 and released two EPs before splitting.

=== Reformation and Escape from Rubbish Island (2000–2005) ===
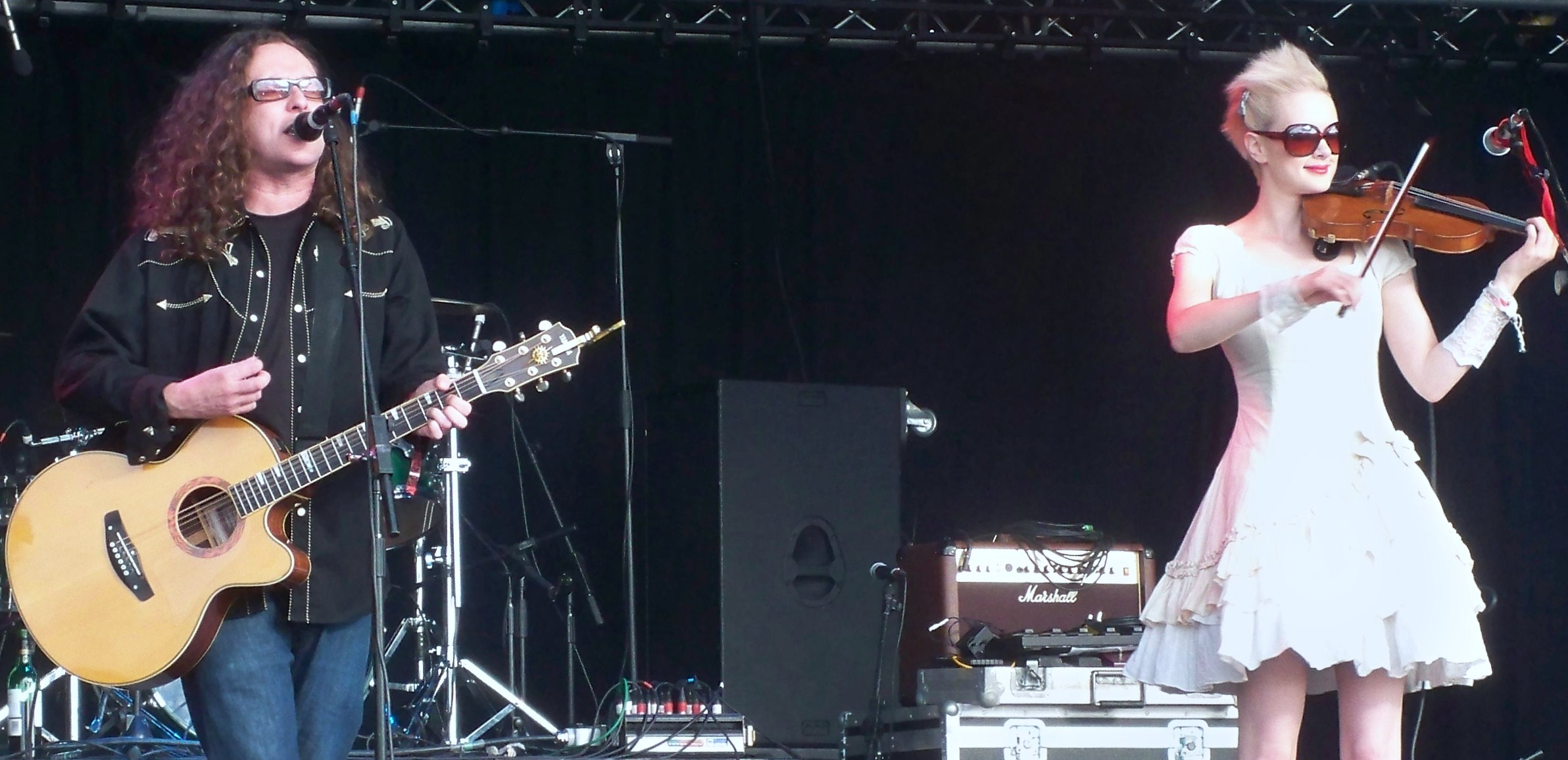
The Wonder Stuff at Guilfest 2011

Hunt, Treece, Gilks, Bell and Whittaker, together with new bassist Stuart Quinell, reformed for a one-off concert at London's Forum in December 2000. This soon became five sold-out nights, preceded by two nights of shows at JB's in Dudley (the site of their debut gig). The group's previous four studio albums were reissued with bonus tracks, and a compilation of b-sides, demos and live tracks, Love Bites & Bruises was released in November.

More live performances continued into 2001 with the release of a live album Cursed with Insincerity in June, and more concerts came in 2002. A DVD release, Construction for the Modern Vidiot, in May 2003 featured highlights from the 2000 to 2002 shows, and then a further tour was announced in December 2003.

In early 2004, Hunt was informed that Gilks and Bell would no longer work with him, and thus The Wonder Stuff (in the eyes of Gilks and Bell) were defunct. As a result, Quinell and Whittaker were informed the band had split, and Hunt began work on a new record with Mark McCarthy (ex-Radical Dance Faction) and Luke Johnson (ex-Amen and son of one-time Wonder Stuff manager, Les Johnson). Sessions for this new solo record were later joined by Malc Treece. The result of this was The Wonder Stuff's first new album for over a decade, Escape from Rubbish Island, which was released in September 2004 with "Better Get Ready for a Fist Fight" and the title track becoming singles. Andres Karu (who had previously worked with Miles as part of The Miles Hunt Club) replaced Luke Johnson on drums. The band toured the UK and US in 2004 and 2005, and were joined by violinist Erica Nockalls in March 2005.

=== Suspended by Stars and anniversary tours (2006–2011) ===
This line-up continued into 2006 for the release of their new album Suspended by Stars in March and the single "Blah Blah La Di Dah" available as a download. The band toured in March 2006 to support the record and in conjunction with their twentieth anniversary.

In April 2006, original Wonder Stuff drummer Martin Gilks was killed in a motorcycle accident in London. An album of We Know Where You Live's demo recordings and live tracks was released in December 2006, with all profits being donated to a charitable concern at the request of Gilks' parents. In 2006, Miles Hunt's acoustic shows were recorded for a live album, titled Interloper and released in October 2006. The Wonder Stuff also began mixing a live record documenting the 2006 concerts and played several UK outdoor shows. The band finished the year by touring the UK again, performing their final show of the year on 8 December at the Shepherd's Bush Empire.

Following this, the band went on hiatus due to Treece starting a family. Hunt released the solo album Not an Exit in 2007, which featured Nockalls and Karu; Hunt toured the UK twice, and the US later in the year. Before recording the album, he expected the band to be working on their own album at some point during the year.

In 2008, the Wonder Stuff entered into a deal with the Carling Academy Group where the band would play their first two studio albums, The Eight Legged Groove Machine and Hup, in full over the course of several shows. Hunt and Treece were confident about the prospect, while the other members of the band who didn't play on either album, had a large workload ahead of them. Hunt came up with the idea of having the band re-recording both albums, which were later released as The Eight Legged Groove Machine: 20th Anniversary Edition (2008) and Hup: 21st Anniversary Edition (2010). In between the two releases, Hunt and Nockalls released the album Catching More Than We Miss in early 2009.

Karu left the band in late 2010 to focus on being a cameraman; he was forced to turn down several opportunities in the US while touring the UK with the band. As Hunt lived in South Shropshire, he would often see Fuzz Townshend of Pop Will Eat Itself at local pubs. Hunt asked him if he would drum for the Wonder Stuff, which he agreed to. In 2011, the band toured the UK to celebrate the 20th anniversary of their third studio album Never Loved Elvis (1991). Prior to the shows taking place, Treece left the band after an argument between himself and Hunt. Hunt's main concern with Treece was due to him making zero effort to write potential new song ideas; Jerry DeBorg of Jesus Jones filled in his position.

=== Oh No It's... The Wonder Stuff to Better Being Lucky (2012–present) ===
Hunt and Townshend both had home studios, the former's centred around programming and rock instruments, while the latter's was focussed on recording drums. The pair planned to record drums at Townshend, and record other instruments and vocals at Hunt's. With a lack of new material at their disposal, the pair opted to do a covers album of artists from the Midlands, dubbed From the Midlands with Love. The cover recordings were released in three instalments between April and November 2012. The project gave Hunt and Townshend a lot of experience when it came to recording at home; Hunt was adamant about producing the band's next album. Oh No It's... The Wonder Stuff was recorded at The Wain House and The Beeches in South Shropshire, with Hunt acting as producer. The band also toured the UK in April 2013, summer shows, and a Sleigh the UK set of shows in December 2013.

In December 2013 the band's track "A Wish Away" was used in a TV commercial for the holiday company Hoseasons.

Following a successful Australian tour in early 2014, drummer Fuzz Townshend left the group to concentrate on his work with The Beat. In May 2014 the band announced a new line-up with Hunt, Nockalls and McCarthy being joined by Dan Donnelly on guitar and Tony Arthy on drums, with Arthy having parted company with Jesus Jones. Arthy had previously worked with Hunt in an earlier, but unreleased incarnation of The Miles Hunt Club in 2001.

In March 2016, a PledgeMusic-funded album, 30 Goes Around the Sun, was released to celebrate 30 years since the band's very first rehearsal in the heart of The Black Country. This coincided with a UK tour during March and April. This album became their first studio release to enter the Top 40 since 1994.

In 2019, the band announced a new lineup, with founder member Malc Treece returning on guitar replacing Donnelly, Pete Howard of The Clash replacing Arthy on drums, and former The Mission guitarist Mark Thwaite replacing McCarthy on bass. After a short tour at the start of the year, the group announced they would be releasing a new album Better Being Lucky towards the end of 2019, featuring several songs co-written by Thwaite on guitar, which would be followed by a tour where the group would play The Eight Legged Groove Machine and Hup albums in full alongside other tracks from their back catalogue and the new album. Thwaite moved to guitar on the live shows promoting the new album with Tim Sewell taking over bass duties.

== Discography ==
- The Eight Legged Groove Machine (1988)
- Hup (1989)
- Never Loved Elvis (1991)
- Construction for the Modern Idiot (1993)
- Escape from Rubbish Island (2004)
- Suspended by Stars (2006)
- Oh No It's... The Wonder Stuff (2012)
- 30 Goes Around the Sun (2016)
- Better Being Lucky (2019)

== Videos and DVDs ==
- Eleven Appalling Promos (1990)
- Welcome to the Cheap Seats (1992)
- Greatest Hits: Finally Live (1994)
- Construction for the Modern Vidiot (2003)
- Hup Live (2010)
- Never Loved Elvis Live (2012)
- Oh Yeah, It's the Wonder Stuff (2014)
