= Erica Nockalls =

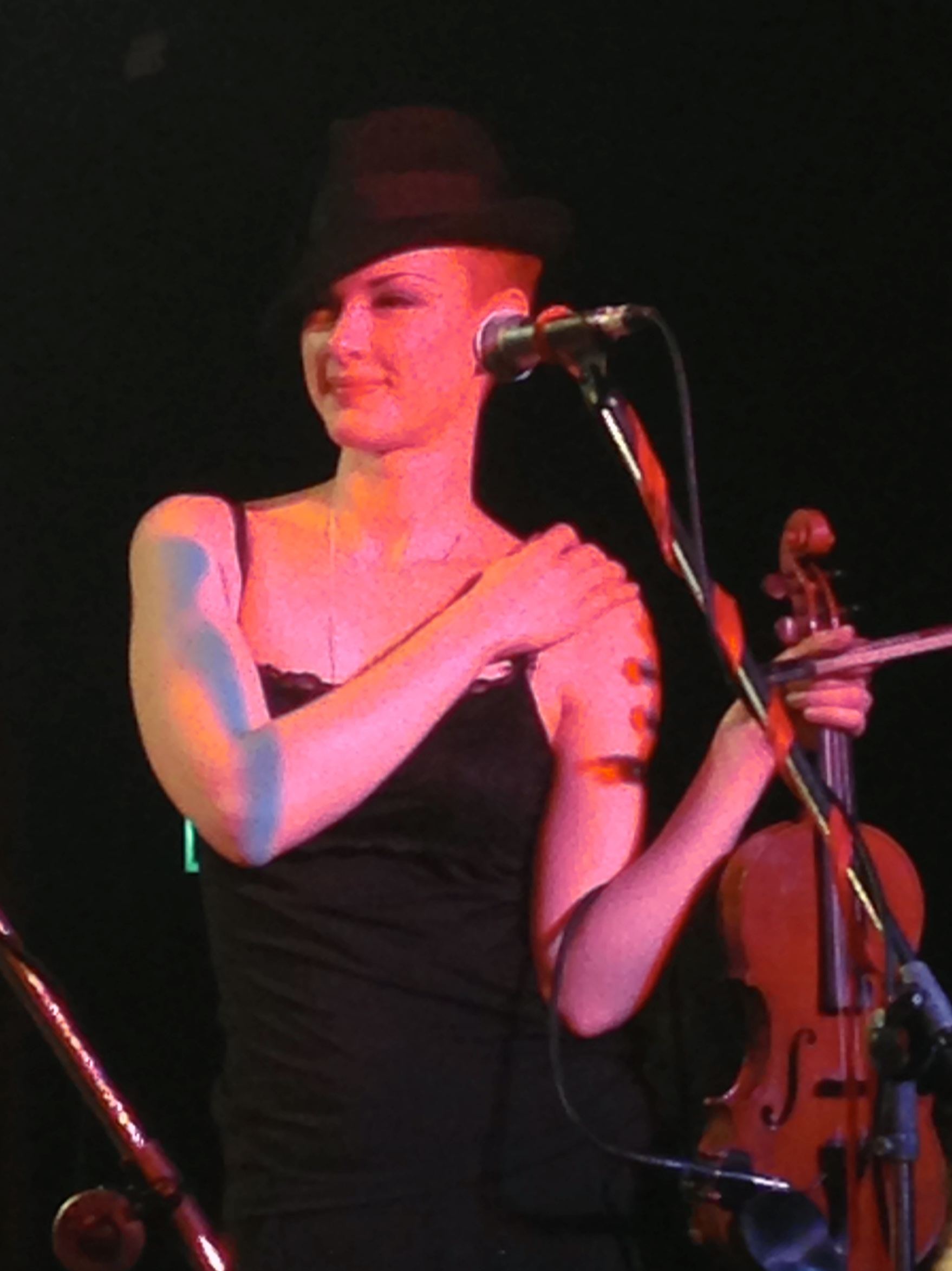
- Nockalls in 2014

Background information
- Born: Erica Rosanne Nockalls; 30 August 1983 (age 43); Rotherham, South Yorkshire, England
- Genres: Indie rock; art rock; pop; alternative rock; metal
- Occupations: Violinist, composer, songwriter, singer
- Instruments: Violin, vocals, piano, viola, guitar, bass guitar
- Years active: 2005–present
- Labels: IRL, Fake Chapter Records, Erica Nockalls Music
- Website: ericanockalls.com

Erica Nockalls (born 30 August 1983) is an English violinist, vocalist, songwriter, and visual artist. She is best known as the violinist in The Wonder Stuff, one-half of acoustic duo Miles Hunt & Erica Nockalls, and as a live fiddle player for The Proclaimers. Nockalls is also the lead vocalist, violinist, and guitarist in her self-titled art-rock band.

== Early life ==
Erica Nockalls was born in Rotherham, England, and studied classical violin from the age of 7. She was offered a placement at Chetham's School of Music at age 9, but only attended for one week, deciding that the school was not for her.

At age 11, Nockalls moved with her family to the Isle of Axholme, North Lincolnshire, where she attended South Axholme Comprehensive School. By age 15 she had passed the Associated Board grade 8 violin exam with distinction, and by age 16 was the leader of the Beechfield Youth Orchestra. Throughout her teens Nockalls played in rock bands with school friends, and played locally as an electric violinist in rock cover bands. Nockalls also taught herself to play piano, guitar, and bass guitar during this time.

She went on to study A-level music, music technology, and media at John Leggott Sixth Form College in Scunthorpe, before successfully auditioning for a place to study violin at Birmingham Conservatoire, aged 19.

== Career ==
=== Music ===
==== Birmingham Conservatoire (2002–06) ====
Nockalls accepted an entrance scholarship to study violin performance and voice at Birmingham Conservatoire. She was mentored by the Japanese violin virtuoso Ken Aiso, graduating in 2006.

==== FIRESWITCH (2002–05) ====
Whilst studying at the Conservatoire, Nockalls formed and performed live with the Birmingham-based progressive metal band FIRESWITCH. They released a self-titled EP in 2003 and gigged extensively throughout the West Midlands. Nockalls shared the role of lead vocalist and played a Ted Brewer electric violin, her first official instrument sponsor.

==== The Wonder Stuff (2005 – present) ====
Nockalls joined UK alternative indie rock band The Wonder Stuff as violinist in 2005 after The Wonder Stuff's producer spotted the violinist busking in Stratford-upon-Avon. Whilst studying at Birmingham Conservatoire, Nockalls frequently busked in the cities and towns of the West Midlands on weekends to support herself financially. Since joining The Wonder Stuff, Nockalls has contributed to the making of six studio albums, providing string arrangements and backing vocals. Nockalls is credited as a co-writer on the album Oh No... It's The Wonder Stuff (2012) and 30 Goes Around the Sun (2016).

==== Miles Hunt and Erica Nockalls (2006–present) ====
In 2006 Nockalls began to tour as violinist with The Wonder Stuff's lead singer and guitarist, performing acoustically as a duo. Hunt and Nockalls have written and released two studio albums together, and produced and released two acoustic compilation albums and one live album.

==== The Proclaimers (2008–present) ====
Nockalls has been performing as live guest violinist with The Proclaimers since the Scottish folk rock band first asked her to play the fiddle solo on the song "Sunshine on Leith", live at Edinburgh Castle in 2008. Nockalls's guest appearances with The Proclaimers have since included performances at many televised UK festivals, including the Glastonbury Festival, Cambridge Folk Festival, V Festival and Belladrum. Nockalls appeared live on The One Show with The Proclaimers on 16 October 2013.

==== Solo work ====
Imminent Room, Nockalls's debut solo album, was released on Independent Records in 2013. The album comprises eleven original songs written and performed by Nockalls in an art-rock/alternative genre.

"It took me until I was 27 to feel I was ready to write my solo album, and as the mission statement explains in the Imminent Room artwork, I was bored of hearing and being disappointed by the efforts of almost everybody else, so I thought I'd invent my own music and stop moaning about it. It's not like I'm a good little classically trained violinist turned bad – I've always been like this, it's just now it's coming out."

Featured artists on Imminent Room include Jeff Walker (Carcass) on "Neon Crucifix", and Wayne Hussey (The Mission) and Mark Thwaite (Tricky/Peter Murphy/Mob Research) on "I Am Me, This Is Now".

Imminent Room was mixed and co-produced by TV composer George Taylor (Fratelli Brothers). The pair initially met in 2008 when Taylor employed Nockalls to record strings on his various TV projects, including BBC Arena documentaries The Dreams of William Golding (2012) and The Hunt for Moby Dick (2009), Farm Fixer (2012), At Your Service (RTE/BBC 2008–2010), Romy Schneider – A Woman in 3 Notes (ORF/Arte 2008).

After the release of Imminent Room, Nockalls formed a live band and embarked on a UK tour supporting The Wonder Stuff. She has since supported artists including Toyah, Public Image Ltd, Pop Will Eat Itself, and Miyavi. When performing live, Nockalls adorns the stage with her own artwork.

Nockall's second solo album EN2 (2014) comprises eleven original songs written, recorded, produced, mixed, and released by Nockalls. In January 2014 she set a goal to produce and self-release an album within the one year. EN2 was funded entirely by sales of her artwork and album pre-sales through her website.

==== Dutch Head ====
Dutch Head is an alternative pop project conceived by George Taylor with material co-written and vocalised by Nockalls. Their debut release is a full album entitled The Music of Sound (2016).

==== Tronos ====
In 2015 Nockalls accepted an invitation from Shane Embury (Napalm Death) to take part as vocalist in his collaboration project Tronos.

==== Live session work ====
Nockalls toured as live violinist, viola player and backing vocalist for Fink on the Wheels Turn Beneath My Feet European tour, 2012.

=== Art ===
Nockalls held her debut gallery exhibition at Havill & Travis, Birmingham, in 2014. The event was an album launch for her second studio album release EN2. She created a painting for each album track, using each song's subject matter as inspiration. The paintings were displayed at listening stations for each song.

Nockalls is a self-taught artist and paints with oils on canvas, often preferring to use her fingers instead of brushes.

== Personal life ==
Nockalls' partner was fellow musician Miles Hunt, their relationship ended in 2018.

== Discography ==
- The Wonder Stuff – Suspended By Stars (2006)
- The Wonder Stuff – Live (2007)
- Miles Hunt & Erica Nockalls – Not An Exit (2007)
- The Wonder Stuff – Eight Legged Groove Machine: 20th Anniversary Edition (2008)
- Miles Hunt & Erica Nockalls – Catching More Than We Miss (2009)
- Shared [Various artists] (2009)
- The Wonder Stuff – Hup: 21st Anniversary Edition (2010)
- Miles Hunt & Erica Nockalls – Live (2011)
- Shared 2 [Various artists] (2011)
- The Wonder Stuff – Oh No! It's...The Wonder Stuff/From The Midlands With Love double album (2012)
- Erica Nockalls – Imminent Room (2013)
- Erica Nockalls – EN2 (2014)
- Dutch Head – The Music of Sound (2016)
- The Wonder Stuff – 30 Goes Around The Sun (2016)
- Erica Nockalls – Dark Music From A Warm Place (2022)

=== Session work albums featuring Nockalls ===
- Jeff Walker and Die Fluffers – Welcome To Carcass Cuntry (2006) [violin performance only]
- Dirty Ray – Big World for a Little Man (2010) [all strings arranged, performed and recorded by Nockalls]

=== Singles ===
- The Wonder Stuff – The Animals & Me (2009)
- Miles Hunt & Erica Nockalls – Stay Scared, Stay Tuned (2009)
- Erica Nockalls – Christmas Song (2010)
- The Wonder Stuff – From The Midlands With Love [Save It For Later/Blackberry Way](2012)
- The Wonder Stuff – From The Midlands With Love 2 [Far, Far Away/There, There My Dear] (2012)
- The Wonder Stuff – From The Midlands With Love 3 [Planet Earth/Get Up] (2012)
- Erica Nockalls – Cut Them Out (2013)
- The Wonder Stuff – Friendly Company (2013)
- The Wonder Stuff – Oh No! (2013)
- E.N.X – Holiday (2014)

=== DVDs ===
- The Wonder Stuff – HUP Live (2009)
- The Wonder Stuff – Never Loved Elvis Live Limited Edition CD/DVD (2011)
- The Wonder Stuff – Oh Yeah...It's The Wonder Stuff (2013)

=== Other (songs featuring Nockalls) ===
- Primitive Painters – It's Not Enough To Hold You Down [strings arranged, performed and recorded by Nockalls]. From the album, Say It 'Til You Mean It (2008)
- Lumiere – Silent Night – [violin performance by Nockalls]. Single release (2010)
- Ting Tings – Day To Day – [violin and viola performance by Nockalls]. From the album; Sounds From Nowheresville. (2012)
- The Mission – Ain't No Prayer in the Bible Can Save Me Now (Wayne Hussey Demo With Erica Nockalls) – [backing vocals and strings arranged, performed and recorded by Nockalls]. From the album The Brightest Light (2013)
- Matt Watson – Grounded [string arrangement written, performed and recorded by Nockalls]. From the album Grounded (2014)
- Matt Watson - We Were Young and Lets Jump Ship. [String arrangement and fiddle, written, performed and recorded by Nockalls] From the album The Endless Shipwreck (2016)
- Mark Gemini Thwaite – Black Heart [co-writer and vocalist]. (2016)
