= Welcome to the Cheap Seats =

1992 EP by the Wonder Stuff

EP by the Wonder Stuff
- Released: 1992
- Length: 2:54 ("Welcome to the Cheap Seats")
- Label: Polydor
- Producers: Mark Glossop, the Wonder Stuff, Simon Efemey

The Wonder Stuff chronology
Cartoon Boyfriend (1990)	Welcome to the Cheap Seats (1992)	On the Ropes E.P. (1993)

The Wonder Stuff singles chronology
"Dizzy" (1991)	"Welcome to the Cheap Seats" (1992)	"Unbearable" (1994)

"Welcome to the Cheap Seats" is a song by British alternative rock band the Wonder Stuff from their third album, Never Loved Elvis (1991). The song features backing vocals by Kirsty MacColl and was released as part of the Welcome to the Cheap Seats EP in 1992, peaking at number eight on the UK Singles Chart. The EP's cover of the country standard "Will the Circle Be Unbroken", recorded during a jam session with Canadian rock group Spirit of the West, was also a popular radio single in Canada.

== Track listings ==
- CD1, 7-inch, and 12-inch EP
1. "Welcome to the Cheap Seats"
2. "Me, My Mom, My Dad and My Brother"
3. "Will the Circle Be Unbroken" (with Spirit of the West)
4. "That's Entertainment"
- CD2 EP
1. "Welcome to the Cheap Seats" (Naked mix)
2. "Caught in My Shadow" (Bare mix)
3. "Circlesquare" (Butt Naked mix)
4. "Can't Shape Up, Again"

== Charts ==
Weekly chart performance for Welcome to the Cheap Seats
Chart (1992)	Peak position
Australia (ARIA)	64
Europe (Eurochart Hot 100)	22
Ireland (IRMA)	9
UK Singles (Official Charts)	8
UK Airplay (Music Week)	10
US Modern Rock Tracks (Billboard) "Welcome to the Cheap Seats"	27

== Release history ==
Release dates and formats for Welcome to the Cheap Seats
Region	Date	Format(s)	Label(s)	Ref.
United Kingdom	1992	7-inch vinyl; 12-inch vinyl; CD	Polydor	
Japan	22 April 1992	CD	Polydor	
Australia	27 April 1992	CD; cassette	Polydor	
