= Martin Gilks =

English drummer and music manager

- Born: Martin Richard Gilks; 2 March 1965; Stourbridge, England
- Died: 3 April 2006 (aged 41) Tooting, London, England
- Occupations: Drummer, personal manager
- Years active: 1985–2006

Martin Richard Gilks (2 March 1965 – 3 April 2006) was an English musician. He was a founding member and the original drummer for the Wonder Stuff, based in Stourbridge (West Midlands, England).

Gilks who was born in Stourbridge, was originally the drummer with the Midlands-based Mighty Lemon Drops before leaving in 1985 (allegedly sacked for not wanting to cut his hair), and later joined Miles Hunt, Malcolm Treece, and Rob "The Bass Thing" Jones to form the Wonder Stuff in March 1986. As part of the Wonder Stuff, Gilks went on to have a string of top-forty singles and an album as well as being voted the best drummer on the planet in an NME poll in 1989. The group split up in 1994.

He continued to work with Treece and Paul Clifford (Rob Jones' replacement who joined the Wonder Stuff in 1990) after the split under the name of We Know Where You Live with Ange Dolittle (formerly of Eat) on lead vocals.

Gilks left the group at the end of 1995 to join his brother "Tank" in forming Furtive Mass Transit Systems, a management company who would later look after Reef, Lowgold, Cable, A and Hundred Reasons. We Know Where You Live disbanded the following year.

When the Wonder Stuff reformed in 2000, performing five sell-out shows at the London venue Forum, Gilks also acted as the group's manager and continued to do so until a much-publicised split of the original members in 2004.

Gilks died, aged 41, on 3 April 2006, after losing control of his motorbike in London.
