= Miles Hunt =

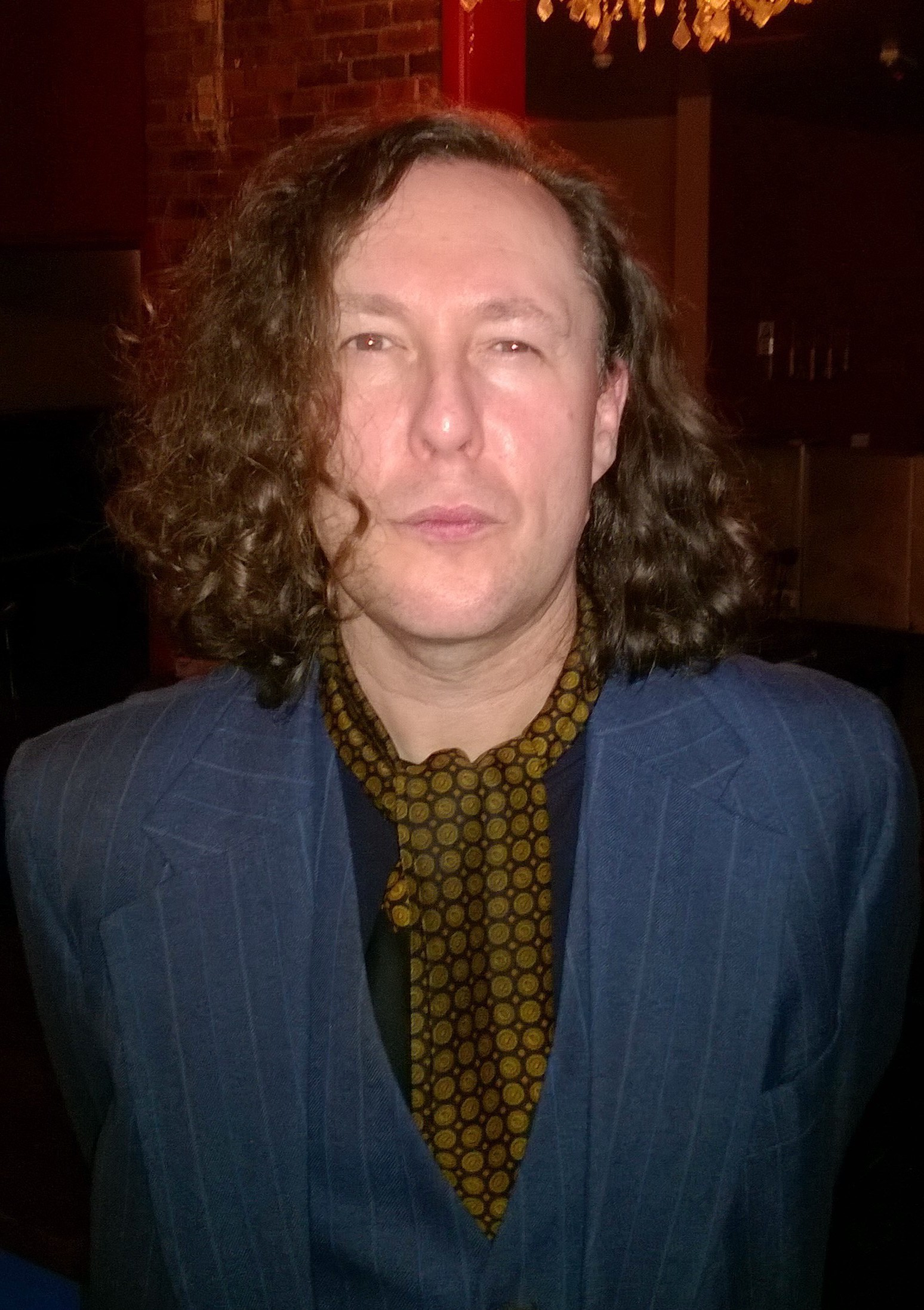
- Hunt in 2015

Background information
- Born: 29 July 1966 (age 60); Birmingham, Warwickshire, England
- Occupations: Singer, songwriter, guitarist
- Years active: 1985–present
- Labels: Polydor Records, Fake Chapter Records
- Website: Official website

Miles Stephen Hunt (born 29 July 1966) is an English singer, songwriter and guitarist. He fronts the alternative rock band The Wonder Stuff.

== Early life ==
His father was a union official for the TGWU. In the 1970s, his father was based at Derby, and they lived in Etwall, Derbyshire, for four years, with Hunt attending the Etwall Junior School and his brother attending the John Port School.

== Career ==
Hunt's first band (in which he played drums) was called From Eden, and featured future members of another successful Stourbridge group, Pop Will Eat Itself. After leaving this band he formed The Wonder Stuff and was their lead singer and principal songwriter until their split in 1994. He briefly presented 120 Minutes on MTV Europe until mid '95, when he formed a new band Vent 414 who failed to match the success of his former band. He toured as a solo performer for a time until he reformed The Wonder Stuff in 2000. The band continue to tour. He also co-wrote and sang the theme tune to the CBeebies television programme Underground Ernie.

Over the last few years he has written a series of printed and online articles for Nottingham-based culture magazine LeftLion. He also performed at the festival Bearded Theory on 15 May 2011 with Erica Nockalls.

== Personal life ==
Hunt married radio DJ Mary Anne Hobbs on 19 April 1990, in the London borough of Tower Hamlets. She was working for the NME at the time. They were married for five years.

He has a daughter.

He has also previously been in a relationship with Erica Nockalls. violonist with The Wonder Stuff.

His uncle, Bill Hunt, played keyboards and horns in an early incarnation of Electric Light Orchestra and later in Wizzard.

== Discography ==
=== Albums ===
==== Vent 414 ====
- Vent 414 (1996)
- The Post Album Demos (2009)
- Second album (2026)

==== Solo ====
- Miles Across America (1998)
- By The Time I Got To Jersey [also known as "Common Threads Live"] (1998)
- Hairy On The Inside (1999)
- MP3 Of The Month Club (2000)
- The Miles Hunt Club (2002)
- Interloper Live 2006 (2006)
- The Custodian (2018)
- The Custodian 2 (2021)
- Things Can Change (2022)

==== With Erica Nockalls ====
- Not An Exit (2007)
- Catching More Than We Miss (2009)
- Shared [Various Artists - includes 3 tracks by Miles and Erica] (2009)
- Shared 2 [Various Artists - includes 2 tracks by Miles and Erica] (2011)
- Live 2010/11 (2011)
- We Came Here To Work (2017)

=== Singles and EPs ===
- Fixer - Vent 414 (1996)
- Life Before You - Vent 414 (1996)
- Life's Great EP (2000)
- Five Songs EP (2000)
- Everything Is Not OK (2002)
- The Miles Hunt Club EP (2002)
- Stay Scared, Stay Tuned - with Erica Nockalls (2009)
- We Came Here To Work - with Erica Nockalls (2017)
