= Jason Bowld =

British drummer

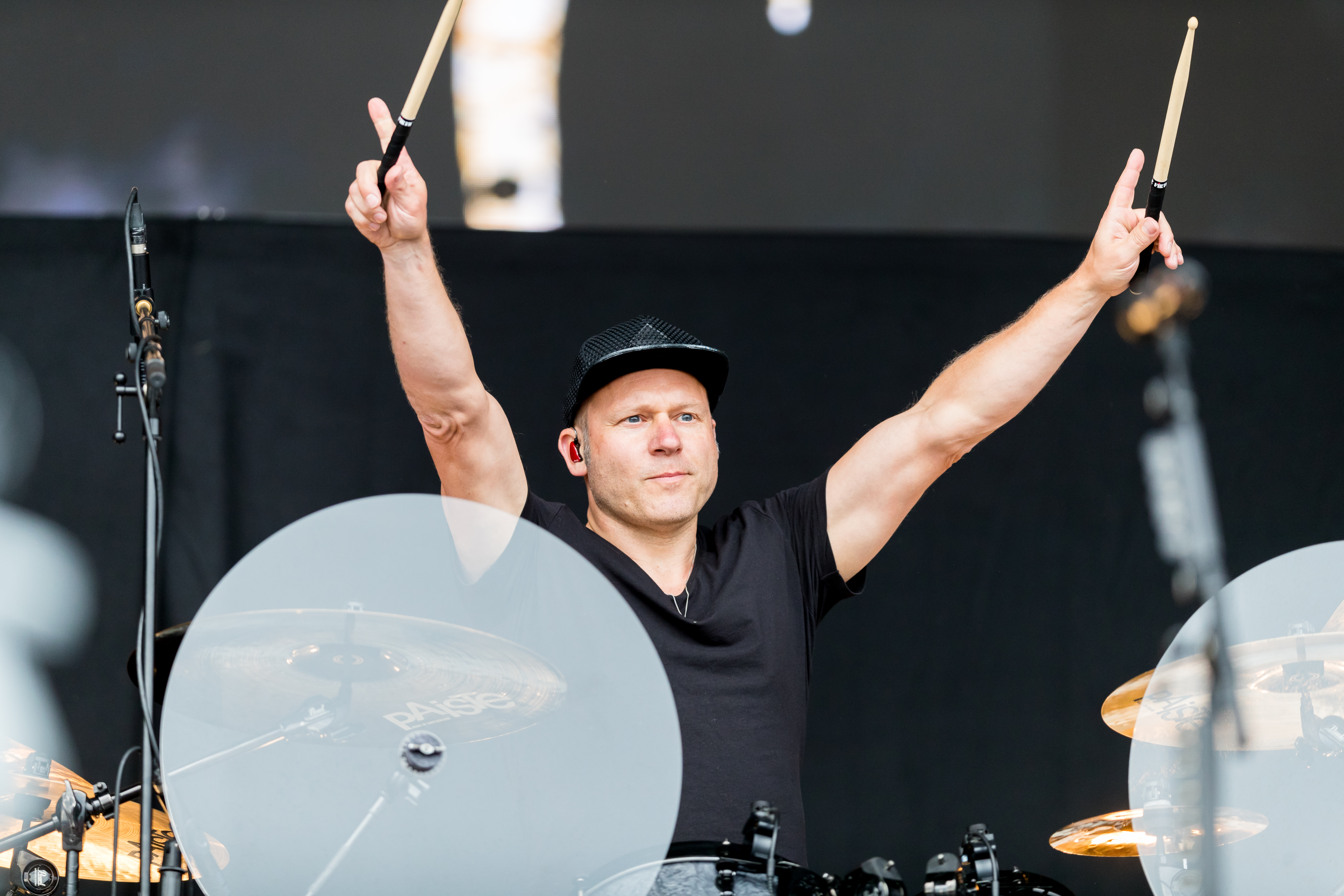
- Bowld in 2022

Background information
- Genres: Metalcore; industrial metal; nu metal; alternative metal; groove metal; electronica
- Occupation: Drummer
- Years active: 1999–present
- Member of: AxeWound; Bullet for My Valentine; Shadow Addict
- Formerly of: Pitchshifter; This Is Menace; Blaze Bayley; Pop Will Eat Itself; Killing Joke; Fightstar; Bill Bailey
- Website: jasonbowld.com

Jason Bowld is a British drummer currently playing with the heavy metal band Bullet for My Valentine, and formerly of Blaze Bayley, Pitchshifter, This Is Menace, Pop Will Eat Itself and AxeWound.

== Biography ==
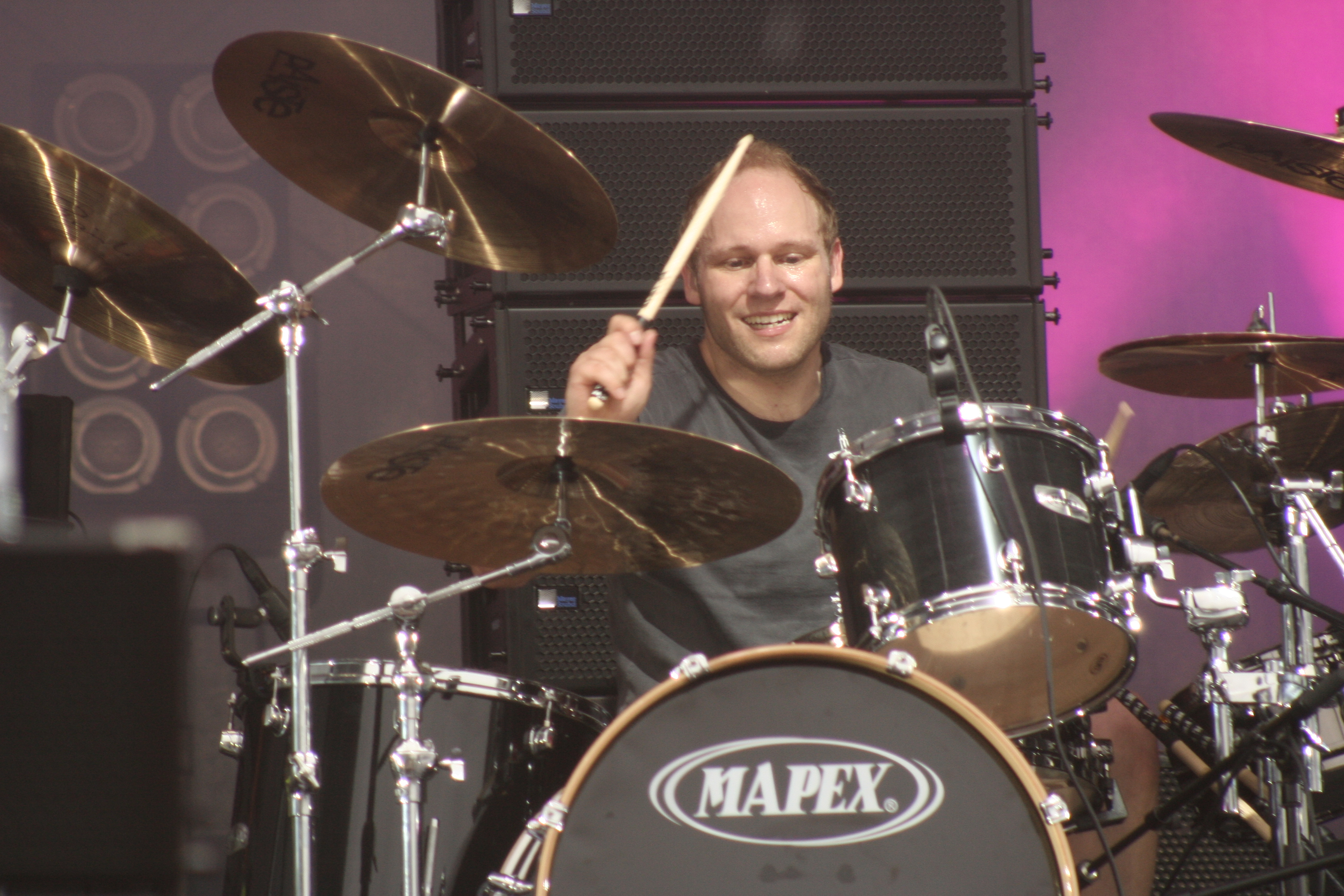
Bowld with Pitchshifter in 2008

Bowld started playing drums at age 13, originally being inspired by a school friend. Nine years later his band Stimulator got a record deal with Geffen. In 2000, he joined industrial metal band Pitchshifter, playing on their sixth album PSI (2002) and continuing with them until they entered a hiatus in 2010. When Pitchshifter was reactivated in 2016, he was replaced by Simon Hutchby due to his commitment to Bullet for My Valentine.

In late 2003, he joined BLAZE, the solo band of former Iron Maiden singer Blaze Bayley, playing on Blood & Belief (2004) before being replaced in 2005 by future Helloween drummer Daniel Loble. Also in 2004 he was a member of Scottish band Hiding Place.

In late 2004, Bowld and Pitchshifter bassist Mark Clayden founded a metalcore project called This Is Menace, this project did not have a permanent vocalist and instead had guests Jaz Coleman (Killing Joke), Barney Greenway (Napalm Death), Mikee Goodman and Justin Hill (Sikth), Jeff Walker (Carcass) and Matt Davies (Funeral For A Friend). This group released their debut album, No End In Sight in April 2004 on PSI records, and their second, The Scene Is Dead in 2007.

In 2008, Bowld formed the band They Fell from the Sky with Colin Doran of Hundred Reasons and recorded a series of demos before disbanding. The band regrouped in 2020 and released their first album 'Decade' in 2021.

In 2010, he joined industrial rock band Pop Will Eat Itself, playing on their albums New Noise Designed by a Sadist (2011) and Anti-Nasty League (2015) before being replaced by original drummer Fuzz Townshend in 2016. In 2011 he played on comedian Bill Bailey's album In Metal as well joining him at Sonisphere 2011 in Knebworth.

In 2012, he co-founded supergroup AxeWound alongside lead vocalist Liam Cormier (Cancer Bats), guitarist and co-vocalist Matthew Tuck (Bullet for My Valentine), guitarist Mike Kingswood of (Glamour of the Kill) and bassist Joe Copcutt of (Zoax and Rise to Remain).

In 2014, he played on Mable, an album by Wildhearts guitarist, CJ Wildheart, he has since played on all for his singles and albums.

He first played with Bullet for My Valentine in 2010 when original drummer Michael Thomas was unable to play. He was confirmed a fulltime member in December 2017, officially replacing Thomas.

In 2021 he cofounded Shadow Addict, an electronic metal band alongside vocalist Jamie Mathas (Bullet for My Valentine), guitarist Jim Davies (The Prodigy, Pitchshifter) and sythesist and bassist Nick Kingsley (Tut Tut Child, Forest Knot).

== Discography ==
- Pitchshifter – Deviant (2000)
- Pitchshifter – PSI (2002)
- Blaze Bayley – Blood & Belief (2004)
- Hiding Place – At One Time Or Another (2004)
- This Is Menace – No End in Sight (2005)
- This Is Menace – The Scene Is Dead (2007)
- Pop Will Eat Itself – New Noise Designed by a Sadist (2011)
- Bill Bailey – Bill Bailey in Metal (2011)
- AxeWound – Vultures (2012)
- CJ WIldheart – Mable (2014)
- Pop Will Eat Itself – Anti-Nasty League (2015)
- Bullet for My Valentine – Live from Brixton: Chapter Two (2017)
- Bullet for My Valentine – Gravity (2018)
- CJ Wildheart – Siege (2020)
- Bullet for My Valentine – Bullet for My Valentine (2021)
- They Fell from the Sky – Decade (2021)
- Chris Catalyst – Kaleidoscopes (2021)
- CJ Wildheart – Lives – (2022)
- Hidora – The Devil Only Knows (2023)
- Chris Catalyst – Mad in England (2023)
- CJ Wildheart – Split – (2023)
- Earthtone9 – In Resonance Nexus (2024)
- CJ Wildheart – Slots – (2025)

=== Guest appearances ===
- Jim Davies – Headwars (2020)

=== EPs ===
- Shadow Addict – Vibrations (2021)
