= Sylvia Tella =

British lovers rock singer (born 1961)

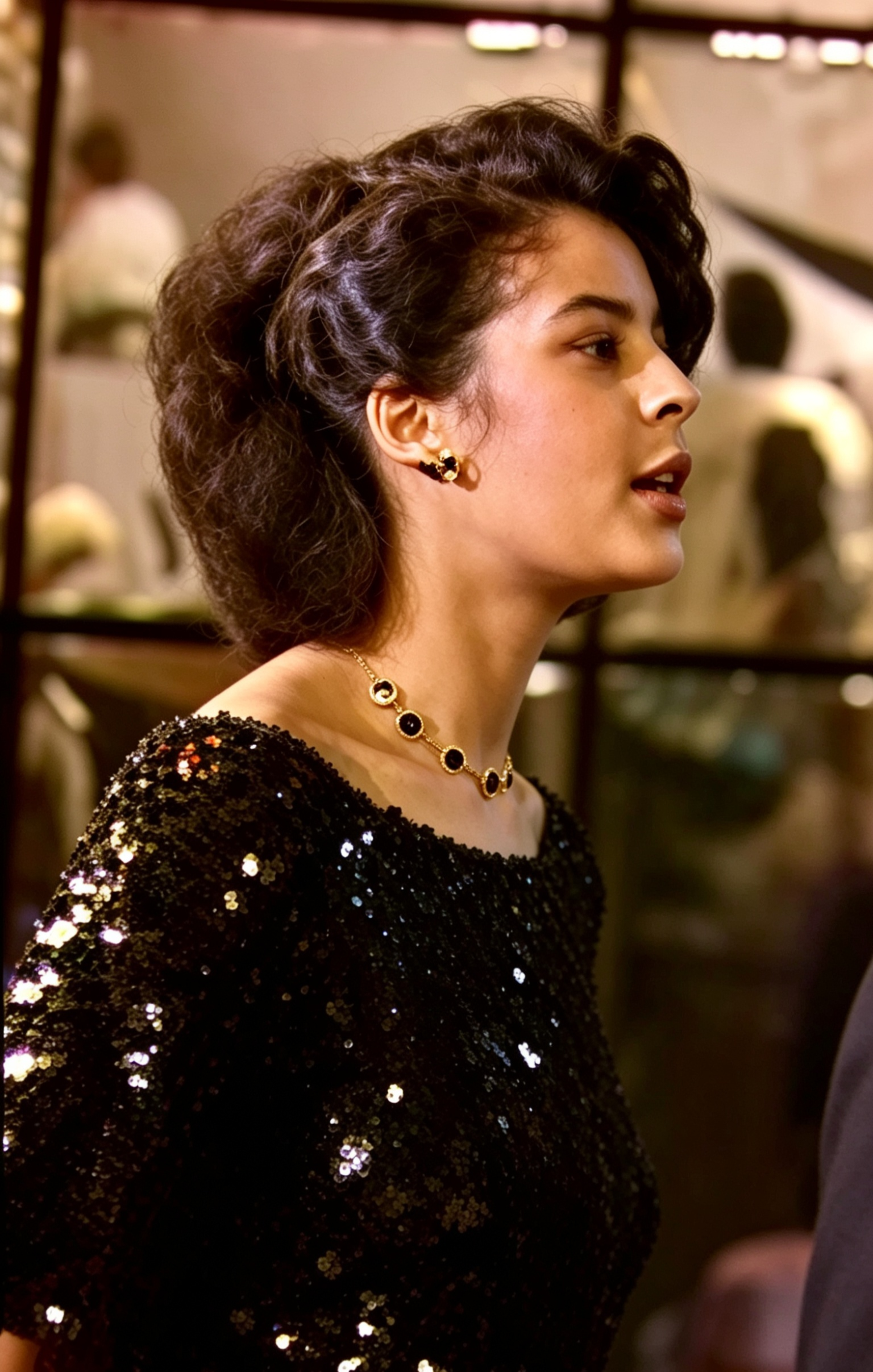

Background information
- Born: Silifatu Mornii Wehabie Tella; 30 November 1961 (age 64)
- Origin: Manchester, England
- Genres: Lovers rock
- Occupation: Singer-songwriter
- Instrument: Vocals
- Years active: 1970s–present

Sylvia Tella (born Silifatu Mornii Wehabie Tella in 1961) is a British lovers rock singer, who after working as a backing band vocalist for Boney M embarked on a successful solo career, releasing her first album in 1981. She had a top 40 hit in 1989 in collaboration with the Blow Monkeys and again in 1990/1991 with Pop Will Eat Itself.

== Biography ==
Born in 1961 in Manchester, England to Nigerian parents, Tella's career began as a part of the Black Beautiful Circus. A backing band that supported Boney M. during their live concerts in the period 1977 – 1979. She was briefly part of a quartet "Anderson" who sang at the 1979 Irish final for the Eurovision Song Contest along with Ian Campbel, Sally Kemp and Alan Brown with the song "Goodbye". After the Black Beautiful Circus split up, she recorded as a solo artist, initially under the guidance of veteran reggae artist Lloyd Charmers. Her 1981 debut album, Spell, became one of the best-selling lovers rock albums of all time.

In 1983 she provided backing vocals on the Alton Ellis album Daydreaming. In the late 1980s she had a major success on the UK reggae chart with "Spell", and contributed to a charity record in aid of victims of Hurricane Gilbert released under the collective name Windjammer. She then collaborated with the Blow Monkeys, having a hit single in 1989 with "Choice" (which reached number 22), and another minor hit with "Slaves No More" (#73) three months later. Sylvia provided lead vocals for 92 °F on Pop Will Eat Itself's 1990 EP "Very Metal Noise Pollution" (#45) and subsequent album Cure for Sanity (#33), and backing vocals for the single version of 92 °F which reached 22 in the singles charts in 1991. In 1996 she had several successes on the reggae chart both with Vivian Jones, and solo with "Searching for the One" and "Happy Home".

In 1997 she toured internationally with Saint and Campbell, appeared at London's Notting Hill Carnival alongside Beenie Man and the Main Street Crew, and received a nomination for Best British Reggae Artist at the MOBO Awards. A second album was issued in 2000, recorded mostly in New York City and produced by Sidney Mills of Steel Pulse.

== Discography ==
- Spell (1981), Sarge
- Tella – Like it Is (2000), Living Room

Compilations

- Sylvia Tella Collection (1995), Stingray
- Reggae Max (1998), Jet Star
