= The Looks or the Lifestyle? =

Studio album by Pop Will Eat Itself
- Released: 7 September 1992
- Recorded: 1991
- Studio: Rockfield Studios, Monmouthshire
- Genre: Alternative dance; alternative rock
- Length: 46.10
- Label: RCA
- Producer: Boilerhouse

Pop Will Eat Itself chronology
Cure for Sanity (1990)	The Looks or the Lifestyle? (1992)	Dos Dedos Mis Amigos (1994)

Singles from The Looks or the Lifestyle?
- 1. "Karmadrome/Eat Me Drink Me Love Me Kill Me" Released: 26 May 1992; 2. "Bulletproof!" Released: 17 August 1992; 3. "Get the Girl, Kill the Baddies" Released: January 1993

Professional ratings
Review scores
Source	Rating
AllMusic	2/5 stars
The Encyclopedia of Popular Music	3/5 stars
Select	3/5 stars

The Looks or the Lifestyle? is the fourth studio album by English alternative rock band Pop Will Eat Itself, released on 7 September 1992 by RCA Records.

== Background ==
During the Cure for Sanity-era the band were scheduled to play "Dance of the Mad Bastards" on Top of the Pops and recruited Fuzz Townshend to mime the drums (due to previously used drum machine) although they then never did play the song on Top of the Pops. In 1991 the band recruited Townshend as the band's drummer and he agreed. The album was produced by London DJ's Ben Wolff and Andy Dean (also known as Boilerhouse) and the band recorded the album in Rockfield Studios in the Welsh countryside and was mixed in London. The first single to be released was "Karmadrome" (originally called "The Scottish Song", but then changed to "Karmadrome"), with AA-side "Eat Me Drink Me Love Me Kill Me", which went to number 17 in the UK Charts in June 1992. They released "Bulletproof", the second single from the album, on 17 August 1992, which didn't do as well as they had hoped but still managed to go to number 24 in the charts and a video was also made. On 7 September 1992 they released the album in UK and Japan and they then released it worldwide in October 1992. On 1 January 1993 they released the "Get the Girl, Kill the Baddies" single which was a massive hit and was their highest charting single going at number 9 in the charts and the album itself went at number 15.

== Music ==
The Looks or the Lifestyle? shows the band working in a dancier style that began to surface on Cure for Sanity, whilst the harsher, industrial rock sound that characterised the band's later work would appear on some songs such as "Eat Me, Drink Me, Love Me, Kill Me" and "Urban Futuristic". The album stirs the band in a less commercial direction, a result of the band ignoring RCA's press for them to in fact head into a more commercial direction.

== Critical reception ==
The Looks or the Lifestyle? received mixed reviews. Josh Landau of AllMusic rated it two stars out of five and said it was "certainly not their best effort," whilst Trouser Press said the album sounds "factory-built, underwritten and overproduced." The Rough Guide to Rock, on the other hand, called it a "groundbreaking" album.

== Track listing ==
1. "England's Finest" – 0:48
2. "Eat Me Drink Me Love Me Kill Me" – 3:18
3. "Mother" – 4:15
4. "Get the Girl + Kill the Baddies" – 5:09
5. "I've Always Been a Coward, Baby" – 3:24
6. "Token Drug Song" – 4:01
7. "Karmadrome" – 4:21
8. "Urban Futuristic (Son of South Central)" – 4:14
9. "Pretty Pretty" – 4:10
10. "I Was a Teenage Grandad" – 4:00
11. "Harry Dean Stanton" – 5:14
12. "Bulletproof!" – 3:14

== Personnel ==
Pop Will Eat Itself

- Clint Mansell – vocals
- Graham Crabb – vocals
- Adam Mole – guitar
- Richard March – guitar
- Fuzz Townshend – drums

Additional musicians

- "The Buzzard" – wild guitar (tracks 2, 3, 7–10)

Production

- The Designers Republic – artwork
- Kennan Keating – mixing
- Noel Rafferty – engineer

== Charts ==
Chart (1992–2010)	Peak position
Australian Albums (ARIA)	165
UK Chart	15

== Release history ==
Region	Date	Distributing Label
UK/Japan	1 September 1992	RCA
US/Canada	27 October 1992	RCA
