= Cure for Sanity =

Studio album by Pop Will Eat Itself
- Released: 22 October 1990
- Recorded: 1990
- Length: 59:06
- Label: RCA
- Producer: Flood

Pop Will Eat Itself chronology
This Is the Day...This Is the Hour...This Is This! (1989)	Cure for Sanity (1990)	The Looks or the Lifestyle? (1992)

Singles from Cure for Sanity
- 1. "Touched by the Hand of Cicciolina" Released: May 1990; 2. "Dance of the Mad" Released: October 1990; 3. "X Y & Zee" Released: December 1990; 4. "92°F" Released: May 1991

Cure for Sanity (also known by its full title The Pop Will Eat Itself Cure for Sanity) is the third studio album by English rock band Pop Will Eat Itself, released on 22 October 1990 by RCA Records. Upon its release, the album entered the UK Albums Chart and stayed there for two weeks, peaking at number 33, and re-entered the chart when it was re-released in July 1991, staying there for one week at number 58. In Australia, the album peaked at number 51 and spent six weeks on the ARIA top 100 albums chart.

In 2011, a two-disc version of the album was issued by Cherry Red Records, containing the original 1990 release in its entirety, plus other material from the same period (i.e., material that either had been previously unreleased or had been released only on singles or as promotional material).

== Recording ==
Following the August 1989 release of the EP Very Metal Noise Pollution, the band made no serious attempts at further recordings until after they returned from a tour of Australia that December. Sessions in January 1990 produced the single "Touched by the Hand of Cicciolina", the subject of which was porn-actress-turned-politician Cicciolina. The publicity campaign for the single included a video and a photo shoot in which Cicciolina participated.

At this point, in the words of band member Adam Mole, "we were struggling for new songs". There was a period of approximately two months after recording "Cicciolina" during which the band made several further attempts at recording, but none of those attempts produced usable results. The band went on tour in the United States in April 1990 and did not return to a recording studio until May.

The sessions that began in May 1990 were productive. There were two groups of sessions, each lasting about three weeks. Both were produced by Flood and were held at the Black Barn recording studio in Surrey.

== Music ==
Cure for Sanity is less light-hearted than prior albums, "mixing a couple of more serious efforts with a new slew of catchy, immediate singles and not-bad album cuts". The album features a dancier and more electronica based sound, eschewing the guitars of previous and future albums.

== Singles ==
"Touched by the Hand of Cicciolina" was released in May 1990, and appeared on the UK Singles Chart for four weeks, peaking at No. 28. Note that the album version of the song is subtitled "(edited highlights)", despite the fact that the single is some three minutes shorter than the album version. The single was issued in various formats (7-inch vinyl, cassette, 12-inch vinyl, and compact disc). Regardless of format, the various versions contained no songs other than "Cicciolina", with that song being presented in either two or three different mix versions.

The second single, released in September 1990, was a shortened version of the track "Dance of the Mad Bastards", variously titled "Dance of the Mad", "Dance of the Mad ..." or "Dance of the Mad (Seven)". It was backed with a shorter, re-mixed version of "Preaching to the Perverted" (the original having appeared on the Very Metal Noise Pollution EP). The single was released in various formats, some of which included a second version of "Dance", subtitled the "Feet in Heat" mix. One version (the second 12-inch vinyl single) also included a third song, "Rockahula Baby", which had appeared earlier in 1990 on the New Musical Express cover album The Last Temptation of Elvis. "Dance of the Mad" appeared on the UK Singles Chart for two weeks, peaking at No. 32.

In 1991, two more singles were released, both of them re-mixes of songs that appeared on the album. The first was "X Y & Zee (Electric Sunshine Style)", backed with "Axe of Men" (and, on the 12-inch vinyl version, also with "Psychosexual"). Issued in January 1991, it peaked on the U.K. Singles chart at No. 15, making it the highest-charting single from the album. It also was the most successful single in the United States, appearing for 16 weeks on the Billboard Alternative Songs chart (peaking at No. 11) and for nine weeks on its Dance Club Songs chart (peaking at No. 17). The second 1991 single was a remixed version of "92°F", backed with "The Incredible P.W.E.I. vs Dirty Harry" (which is not the same song as the similarly-titled album track). The remix was done by Boilerhouse and was called "The Birth" mix. Both the compact-disc and the 12-inch vinyl versions of the single contained additional Boilerhouse remixes. The 10-inch vinyl version included yet another Boilerhouse remix, plus "Another Man's Rhubarb (Good Vibes Mix)". Released in April 1991, it appeared on the UK Singles Chart for three weeks, peaking at No. 23.

"Another Man's Rhubarb", backed with "92°F", was released in the United States (only) as a promotional "not-for-sale" single in 1991. It was released in two formats: 12-inch vinyl and compact disc. Both formats contained the same four tracks—two mixes of "Rhubarb" and two mixes (both by Boilerhouse) of "92°F". "Rhubarb" appeared on Billboard's Dance Club Songs chart for five weeks, peaking at No. 37.

== Critical reception ==
Professional ratings
Review scores
Source	Rating
AllMusic	4/5 stars
Select	3/5 stars

In a contemporaneous review for Keyboard, Jim Aikin found the album to be "solidly mixed, with plenty of processed samples colliding over aggressive hip-hop grooves". He concluded his review by describing the album as "intensely modern".

In his retrospective review for AllMusic, Ned Raggett opined that the album was not as good as the previous This Is the Day...This Is the Hour...This Is This!, but "not all that far off". He described it as "mixing a couple of more serious efforts with a slew of catchy, immediate singles and not-bad album cuts". Raggett gave specific praise to the opening segue of "Moral Majority" into "Dance", as well as "X Y & Zee" (calling it "warm and wistful") and "Nightmare at 20,000 ft.". Regarding Sylvia Tella's appearance on "92°F", he found it to be "all right, if nothing to write home about".

Trouser Press expressed a less positive opinion of Cure for Sanity, describing it as the "beginning of the artistic end" for the band and noting that "the absurd sloganeering is tiresome". Nonetheless, there was specific praise for "Dance" and "Lived in Splendor" as examples of beats that "still pack a wallop". The reviewers also found the "Sensory Amplification" remix of "X Y & Zee" to be "beatific".

== Track listing ==
On the 1990 and 1991 releases, all tracks were credited to Vestan Pance, the collective pseudonym of the band. On the 2011 release, the tracks are credited as noted.

Original Album Release
No.	Title	Writer(s)	Length
1.	"The Incredible P.W.E.I. vs The Moral Majority"	Graham Crabb	1:34
2.	"Dance of the Mad Bastards"	Crabb	5:31
3.	"88 Seconds... & Still Counting"	Crabb, Clint Mansell, Richard March, Adam Mole	3:53
4.	"X Y & Zee"	Mansell	4:35
5.	"City Zen Radio 1990/2000 FM"	Crabb	0:49
6.	"Dr. Nightmare's Medication Time"	Mansell	3:10
7.	"Touched by the Hand of Cicciolina (edited highlights)"	Crabb, Mansell, March, Mole	7:40
8.	"1000x NO!"	Crabb	2:38
9.	"Psychosexual"	Crabb, Mole	2:10
10.	"Axe of Men"	Crabb, Mansell, March, Mole	4:21
11.	"Another Man's Rhubarb"	Crabb	4:11
12.	"Medicine Man Speak with Forked Tongue"	Mansell	0:31
13.	"Nightmare at 20,000 ft"	Mansell	4:12
14.	"Very Metal Noise Pollution"	Crabb, March	1:27
15.	"92°F (The 3rd Degree) (Note: A different version had already been released on the Very Metal Noise Pollution EP.)"	Crabb	5:38
16.	"Lived in Splendour: Died in Chaos"	Crabb	5:06
17.	"The Beat That Refused To Die"	Crabb	1:40

American and Canadian Release
No.	Title	Length
18.	"X Y & Zee (Sensory Amplification)"	7:16

The 1991 re-release differed from the original (British) release by including the single versions of "Cicciolina", "X Y & Zee", and "92°F". The single version of "Cicciolina" replaced the original album version; the other two singles were included in addition to their original album versions. Thus, the re-released version had 19 tracks as compared to the original album's 17 tracks.

== Personnel ==
- Sylvia Tella – vocals on "92°F (The Third Degree)"
- Easy O – voice of Dr. Nightmare
- Flood – producer, mixing
- Matthew Ollivier, Alan Moulder – engineers
- Designers Republic – artwork

== Charts ==
Chart (2008)	Peak position
UK Albums Chart	33
Chart (2009)	Peak position
Australian Albums Chart	51
