= Anti-Nasty League =

Studio album by Pop Will Eat Itself
- Released: 25 April 2015
- Recorded: 2014
- Genres: Industrial rock; electronic rock
- Length: 53:30
- Label: Rumjoint
- Producer: Tim Muddiman

Pop Will Eat Itself chronology
New Noise Designed by a Sadist (2011)	Anti-Nasty League (2015)

Singles from Anti-Nasty League
- 1. "21st Century English Civil War"

Professional ratings
Review scores
Source	Rating
Louder Than War	9/10 stars
Record Collector	4/5 stars
Outline	5.5/10

Anti-Nasty League is the seventh studio album by English industrial rock band Pop Will Eat Itself, released on 25 April 2015 by Rumjoint Records.

== Promotion ==
In June 2014 Pop Will Eat Itself released "Reclaim the Game (Funk FIFA)" and "Watch the Bitch Blow" in August, with the latter appearing on Anti-Nasty League. In preparation for the album's release the single "Digital Meltdown" was featured on Soccer AM on 28 March 2015. Following the album's pre-order and digital release on 25 April 2015 the band embarked on a 9-date tour of England starting with a sold-out gig in Leicester on 22 May 2015 and concluding at Leamington Spa on 30 May 2015. A video for 21st Century English Civil War was released on 1 May 2015

== Reception ==
Writing for Louder Than War, David J Harris noted "It’s an album that’s brimming with vitality. Many of the verses are rapped over thick driving bass riffs that rip into stimulating metal guitar licks fused with instantaneous catchy choruses" and awarded the album 9/10. Rockregeneration.co.uk noted the album's "political/social commentary" and highlighted the album's punk rock attitude stating "Throughout this album is the underlying message to [...] rise up against what is happening around you". In writing for Record Collector, Tim Peacock awarded the album 4/5, praising the tracks Watch The Bitch Blow and Digital Meltdown, while also stating that two songs on the album "credibly hark back to the Poppies at their hard-hitting, Dos Dedos-era best"

== Track listing ==
No.	Title	Writer(s)	Length
1.	"21st Century English Civil War"	Graham Crabb	5:01
2.	"They Can't Take (What You Won't Let 'Em Have)"	Crabb; Mary Byker; Tim Muddiman; Davey Bennett	3:42
3.	"Mental Pollution"	Crabb; Byker; Norman Fisher-Jones	4:17
4.	"Digital Meltdown"	Crabb; Byker; Kerry Hammond	3:38
5.	"(War Inside) My Stupid Head"	Crabb; Muddiman; Bennett	3:35
6.	"Set Sail for Death"	Crabb; Byker; Bennett	5:08
7.	"Middle East Street Party"	Crabb; Byker; Muddiman	4:04
8.	"Sacrifice & Pain"	Crabb; Byker	3:41
9.	"Angry Man's Deathbed"	Crabb; Muddiman	2:36
10.	"King Kisser"	Crabb; Byker	4:25
11.	"Watch the Bitch Blow" (album version)	Crabb; Byker; Hammond	3:26
12.	"Director's Cut"	Crabb; Byker; Hammond	4:25
13.	"Smash It!" (bonus track)	Crabb; Jason Bowld	4:19

== Personnel ==
Adapted from the album's liner notes.

=== Pop Will Eat Itself ===
- Graham Crabb – vocals, keyboards, programming
- Mary Byker – vocals, keyboards, programming
- Tim Muddiman – guitar, bass, keyboards, programming
- Davey Bennett – bass
- Jason Bowld – drums

=== Additional personnel ===
- Dave Ogilvie – guitar (1)
- Kurt Maas – guitar (1)
- Noko 440 – keyboards (3, 8, 12), programming (3), add. bass (3, 12), add. guitar (8)
- Kerry "The Buzzard" Hammond – guitar (4, 11, 12)
