= Everything's Cool =

Everything's Cool may refer to:

- "Everything's Cool" (song), a song from the Pop Will Eat Itself album Dos Dedos Mis Amigos
- Everything's Cool (film), a 2007 documentary film that examines the divide between scientists and the general populace on the topic of global warming
