= Vileevils =

Vileevils (Vile Evils)
- Origin: Birmingham, England
- Genres: Electronic Dance
- Years active: 2006–2010
- Past members: Graham Crabb; Adam Mole; Robert "Fuzz" Townshend; Luke Mole; Matt K

Vileevils were an electronic dance duo, formed when the 2005 reunion of Pop Will Eat Itself failed to become a full-time project. Singer Clint Mansell and guitarist Richard March were too busy with side projects to dedicate themselves to writing and performing new material, and so the remaining three members of the band decided to form the spin-off band Vileevils, utilising the Sonic Noise Byte material that PWEI had written following the reunion.

The band toured extensively in the UK, before reorganising as a more minimalist two-piece, after Fuzz left the band in 2007. On 23 February 2010, Vile Evils announced that they had disbanded, and that Graham Crabb would move on to reconstitute Pop Will Eat Itself.

== Discography ==
The band's first output was a collaboration with U.S. electronic act 3kStatic entitled 'Council Housed And Violent' in February 2008. The track used components from PWEI's 'Let It Flow' & Vile Evils yet to be released 'Fucking & Fighting'. The latter was released in its own right a month later. Second single 'The Way I Feel Inside' featuring the voice of Colin Blunstone of The Zombies came out in June 2008. The release was under the moniker Vile Evils Vs. Zombies. A single titled 'No Fear' was released in August the same year, and this was based on the Pop Will Eat Itself song 'Menofearthereaper'. All releases were on U.S. electronic label dPulse.

"Demon" was released as a digital single on 2 February 2010. Demon was co-written by and features former Pop Will Eat Itself member Clint Mansell. "Axe of Men 2010" by PWEI was also on the single.

The Vile Evils debut album Vive le VileEvil was to be released through dPulse recordings on 16 March 2010. However, it was canceled in lieu of Vile Evils disbandment. Instead, a 3-CD compilation named Vive le Vile Evils was released as a coda to Vile Evils musical output, featuring select tracks, remixes, outtakes, and rarities.

== Other activity ==
Vile Evils were the subject of a Sony Acidplanet Remix competition in May 2008 where contestants were invited to remix Vile Evils track 'No Fear'.

Vile Evils have completed demo versions of the soundtrack for the soon to be filmed feature "Ugly and in love" written by James Anderson Brown.

The KMFDM remix album Krieg contains the Vile Evils "Pop Will Eat This" mix of the song "Bitches" (originally released on Blitz).
