= Sweet Sweet Pie =

1987 song performed by Pop Will Eat Itself

Single by Pop Will Eat Itself
- B-side: "The Devil Inside"/"Runaround"
- Released: 26 January 1987
- Label: Chapter 22
- Songwriter(s): Graham Crabb, Clint Mansell, Richard March, Adam Mole

Pop Will Eat Itself singles chronology
"Sweet Sweet Pie" (1987)	"Love Missile F1-11" (1987)

"Sweet Sweet Pie" is the debut single recorded in 1987 by the band Pop Will Eat Itself. It was released in two different formats: 12" and 7", which feature different colours on the cover artwork but identical track listings. It is the first single released by the band, and, while still having the "jangly" grebo sound synonymous with their early work, displays several notable differences from the songs found on The Poppies Say GRRRrrr! and Poppiecock. The song is a non-album single, though it does appear on the compilation album Now for a Feast!. The guitar seems more restrained, with heavy use of palm muting. There is also a much more prominent utilization of an organ playing the main melody.

The song peaked at No. 100 on the UK Singles Chart in February 1987.

Both of the B-sides – "The Devil Inside" and "Runaround" – also demonstrate the newer, more professional sound mentioned above. "Runaround" features an unusual synthesiser not usually found in Pop Will Eat Itself's music.

== Music video ==
A music video was filmed for the song in early 1987, and was included on the video compilation Unspoilt by Progress. It features the members of the band dancing, playing, and making use of various playground equipment. Much of the video is shot in black and white, which reflects the vintage sound of the recording.

== Track listing ==
Side One

1. "Sweet Sweet Pie" 2:12

Side Two

1. "The Devil Inside" 1:46
2. "Runaround" 2:05
