= Jim Smallman =

British comedian

- Born: James Daniel Smallman; Leicester, England
- Children: 2

Comedy career
- Years active: 2005–present
- Medium: Stand-up
- Website: www.jimsmallman.com

James Daniel Smallman is an English stand-up comedian, radio presenter, professional wrestling promoter, blogger and voice-over artist. Smallman attended school in Hinckley, and went on to De Montfort University, graduating with a first-class Honours degree in English Literature.

== Career ==
Smallman first entered into comedy at the age of 27, whilst working at the head office of Next plc. He attended a 12-week comedy workshop to help him with his nerves whilst giving presentations, which led to his decision to engage in comedy on a professional level. His stand-up combines storytelling and improvisation.

In 2006, Smallman was a finalist in the Laughing Horse New Act of the Year competition. He was also a finalist in the Leicester Mercury/Equity New Comedian of the Year 2007.

In 2009, his first hour-long show, The Boy Next Door Gone Wrong, was nominated for the Best Debut Show at the Leicester Comedy Festival. In 2010 he picked up two awards at the Hollywood Fringe Festival: Best International Show and Best Comedy performance, both for The Boy Next Door Gone Wrong. He also became the Saturday morning presenter at BBC Radio Leicester.

In 2011, Jim took his second full-length show 'Tattooligan' to the Edinburgh Fringe. As a publicity stunt he had the show title tattooed across his stomach, and for the year was a columnist for Skin Deep magazine. In 2012 he made his first appearance on BBC Radio 5 Live's Fighting Talk, before taking his third full-length show 'Let's Be Friends' to the Edinburgh Fringe. In both 2011 and 2012 Smallman performed at The Gilded Balloon. 'Tattooligan' was filmed as a DVD / digital download in September 2011 in Leicester.

From 2013 to 2015, Smallman voiced the National Geographic Channel series Car SOS.

2013 saw further appearances on Fighting Talk, plus a weekly news review slot called 'All the Small Things" on XFM, while Smallman also supported Mick Foley on his stand-up comedy tour. His 2015 show "My Girls", about Smallman's wife and daughter, was nominated for best new show at the Dave Leicester Comedy Festival and will have a full run at the Edinburgh Fringe Festival.

Smallman also runs a football blog called The Football Neutral.

== Wrestling ==
Smallman is heavily involved in professional wrestling, and is the co-founder and former ring announcer of PROGRESS Wrestling. He previously hosted a weekly wrestling magazine show called 'The Slam' which aired on Sports Tonight Live and 'Tuesday Night Jaw', a weekly podcast that was focused on the world of wrestling, with a main focus on WWE NXT UK and his own company, PROGRESS. In 2013, he supported both Mick Foley and William Regal on their stand-up tours of the UK. On 2 August 2019 Smallman revealed that Chapter 100 would be the last show he produces for PROGRESS, citing his increasing production role with NXT UK. Smallman is the Director of International Scouting for WWE.

== Personal life ==
Smallman has been straight edge since 1998 and a vegan since the start of 2018. He was a vegetarian prior to becoming vegan. He lives in North Wales with his wife, has a daughter from a previous relationship (born 2003) and a son (born 2016). Smallman is heavily tattooed, with several of his designs representing publicity stunts, including a portrait of Northern Irish comedian Martin Mor on his upper right arm as the result of a lost bet. He also has designs representing his love of video games and trainers as well as portraits of Mick Foley and Ron Burgundy.

== Television appearances ==
- Midlands Today – BBC One Midlands, 2009
- The Big Questions – BBC One, 2010
- Talking Balls – Sports Tonight, 2011–12
- The Slam – Sports Tonight, 2012
- Car SOS – National Geographic Channel, 2013–15 (narrator)
- Console Yourself - Ginx TV, 2014
- Trans World Sport - Channel 4, 2014
- BBC News - BBC News, 2015

== Radio ==
- BBC Radio Leicester – 2009–11, presenter
- Live at the Boat Show, BBC Radio 4 Extra – 2011, host
- Fighting Talk, BBC Radio 5 Live – 2012–present, guest
- The Jo Good Show, XFM – 2013–2014, contributor
- The Unequal Past, BBC Radio 4 - 2015, presenter
