= Car SOS =

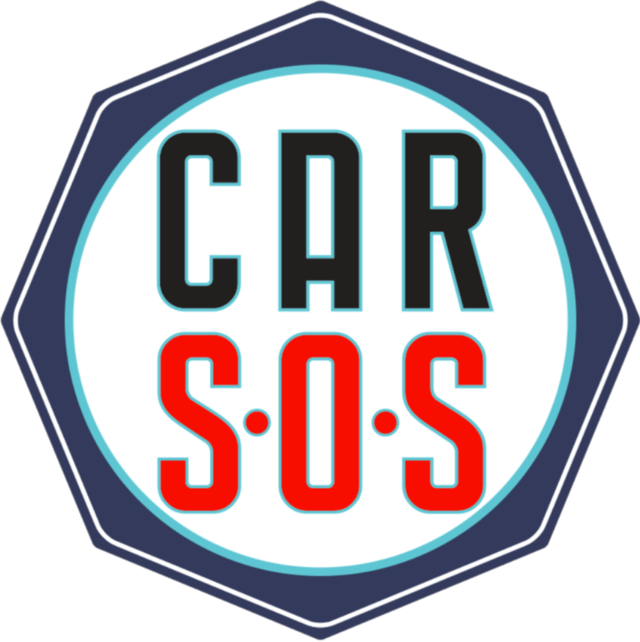
- Genre: Motoring; Entertainment
- Showrunner: Stephen Taylor Woodrser
- Directed by: Stephen Taylor Woodrow; Stuart Readfern; Jon Scorer; Steve Bonser; James Redgate; Ben Mann; Stephen Mizelas
- Presented by: Tim Shaw; Fuzz Townshend
- Starring: Nathans Paint & Restoration Specialist team (Series 12 - Present)
- Narrated by: Jim Smallman (series 1-3); Phil Cornwell (series 4-)
- Country of origin: United Kingdom
- Original language: English
- No. of seasons: 14
- No. of episodes: 134

Production
- Executive producers: Charlie Bunce Theo Williams; Carolyn Payne; Simon Raikes Helen Hawken
- Running time: 44 mins approx (not inc. advertisements)
- Production companies: Renegade Pictures (seasons 1–10); Wall to Wall Media (season 11–); National Geographic Channels; NGC UK Partnership

Original release
- Network: National Geographic Channel; Channel 4/More4 (repeats)
- Release: 7 February 2013 – present

Car SOS is a British automotive entertainment television series that airs on National Geographic Channel as well as being repeated on Channel 4 and More4. The first ten series are also available on the Disney+ streaming service. The series began in 2013 and is presented by Tim Shaw and Fuzz Townshend. Series 1 - 10 are also shown on the Australian network ABC and streamed on ABC iview.

Tim and Fuzz work closely with a specialist car restoration team helping to restore owners' classic cars from across the UK and Europe, often beginning in a serious state of disrepair. The owner, unbeknownst to them and their car are nominated by a relative or friend because the owner is unable to continue the restoration of the vehicle, due to unforeseen medical or financial reasons. The owners are then surprised with their finished car in a staged event, usually set up by Shaw.

In a special series-three episode, a 1962 Austin-Healey Sebring Sprite destined for the British Motor Museum was restored with the owner's knowledge, breaking the show's format due to the car's significance, having been driven by a racing team that included Steve McQueen and Sir Stirling Moss, who appears in the episode.

== Presenters ==
The series is presented by motor vehicle and engineering enthusiast Tim Shaw and musician and mechanic Fuzz Townshend. Townshend leads a team of car restoration experts who mainly work off camera, though they do have occasional cameos, most notably "Workshop" Phil Palmer's appearances within skits or scripted light-hearted moments taking place within the workshop.

Presenters

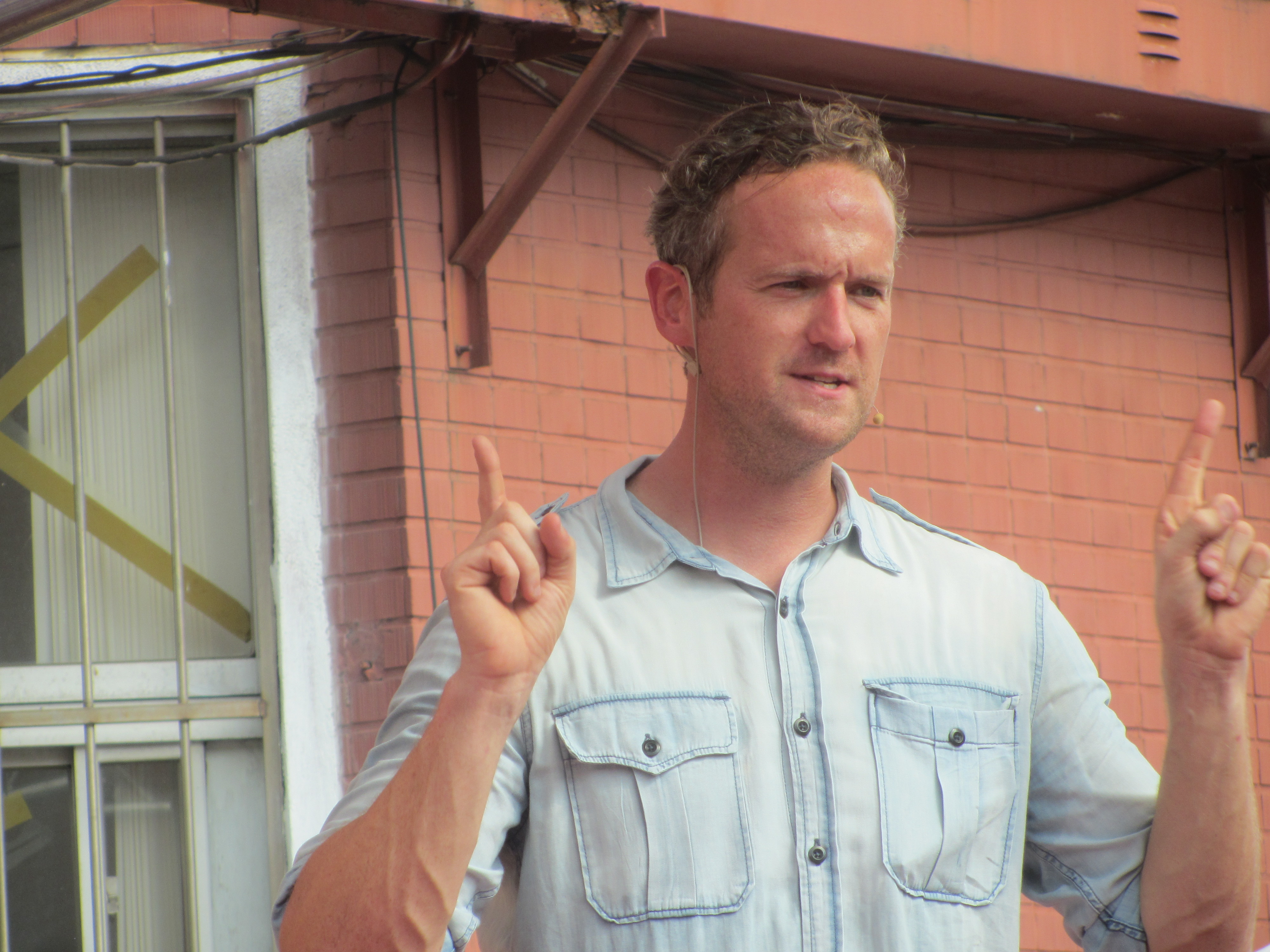
Presenter, Tim Shaw.

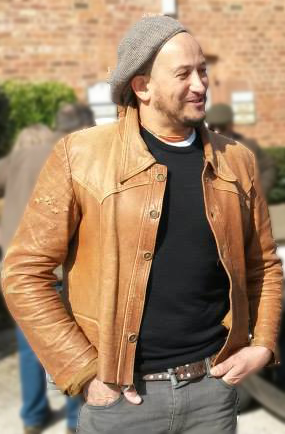
Presenter, Fuzz Townshend.

== Format ==
Each episode begins with Tim and Fuzz picking up and reviewing the featured car. Shaw will discuss why the car is being restored with the nominee's relatives, while Townshend inspects the car's state, working out the amount of work needed. The car is then winched onto a trailer and taken to Townshend's workshop, where it is inspected further by all of the restoration team. As the restoration work begins, Shaw is given a list and travels the country to find the much needed parts, often portrayed in a comedic, 'blagging' manner. Shaw and Townshend will often break from the restoration, leaving it in the safe hands of the team to visit other restored models of the same car, test driving them and talking with other owners. Towards the end of the restoration, Shaw invites the nominee's family to discuss setting up a fake scenario or event in which they can return the car to the owner. The staged event is also usually presented in a comedic manner, with Shaw often in disguise before revealing himself and his intentions to the owner, who is then presented with their restored car.

A special aired as the third episode of the third series featuring Sir Stirling Moss. A 1962 Sebring Austin Healey Sprite, once driven at Sebring as part of a racing team featuring Steve McQueen and Sir Stirling Moss, was restored by the team and was placed in the Heritage Motor Centre (now named the British Motor Museum) once completed. In the 1962 race, a sister car was driven by Moss to a class win, and second overall. That car had since been destroyed, leaving the team car, restored by the team, as the only Sebring Sprite left in the world.

== Episodes ==
As of May 2024, twelve full series, plus 2 special Seven Day Challenge episodes have aired.

Series	Episodes	Originally released	
Series	Episodes	First released	Last released
1	10	7 February 2013	11 April 2013
2	10	24 March 2014	26 May 2014
3	10	9 April 2015	11 June 2015
4	10	7 April 2016	9 June 2016
5	10	16 March 2017	18 May 2017
6	10	18 March 2018	10 May 2018
S	2	14 February 2019	21 February 2019
7	10	28 February 2019	2 May 2019
8	10	12 March 2020	11 March 2021
9	10	18 March 2021	20 May 2021
10	10	10 March 2022	12 May 2022
11	10	9 March 2023	11 May 2023
12	10	7 March 2024	9 May 2024
13	10	13 March 2025	1 May 2025
14	10	13 March 2026	TBA

=== Series 1 (2013) ===
No. overall	No. in season	Title	Original release date
1	1	"Cosworth in Crisis"	7 February 2013
Tim and Fuzz rescue a 1986 Ford Sierra RS Cosworth for Darren since The Sierra was neglected after a family tragedy.
2	2	"Beetle Mania"	14 February 2013
Tim and Fuzz attempt to renovate 'Boris the Blade', a Volkswagen Type 1 Beetle.
3	3	"Phoenix Jeep"	21 February 2013
Tim and Fuzz renovate a US Army World War II Willys Jeep damaged in an arson.
4	4	"Fiat Fiasco"	28 February 2013
Tim and Fuzz help an injured man with his Fiat 850 Sport Spider.
5	5	"Anglia Angels"	7 March 2013
Tim and Fuzz work with a family, all of whom have a Ford Anglia.
6	6	"The Rover's Return"	14 March 2013
Tim and Fuzz help an injured man with his 1972 Rover P6.
7	7	"Triumph of the Stag"	21 March 2013
Tim and Fuzz go Portsmouth to help an injured former Royal Navy diver's 1976 Triumph Stag.
8	8	"Austin Re-Powered"	28 March 2013
Tim and Fuzz go to Suffolk to secretly restore a 1928 Austin 12 Tourer.
9	9	"Zodiac Come Back"	4 April 2013
Tim and Fuzz restore a Ford Zodiac in Norfolk.
10	10	"Lotus Flowers"	11 April 2013
Tim and Fuzz restore a 1970 Lotus Elan in Warwickshire owned by an injured ex-racer.

=== Series 2 (2014) ===
No. overall	No. in season	Title	Original release date
11	1	"Cortina Conundrum"	24 March 2014
Tim and Fuzz restore a Ford Cortina GT that is little more than a well-preserved body shell with a hole in the roof.
12	2	"MG Miracle"	31 March 2014
Tim and Fuzz go to Cheshire for a 1938 MG TA.
13	3	"A Porsche Puzzle"	7 April 2014
Tim and Fuzz restore a 1980s Porsche 911 from East Anglia that is rusting and collapsing in on itself.
14	4	"The Herald Angels"	14 April 2014
Tim and Fuzz go to Cornwall for a 1970 Triumph Herald.
15	5	"Land Rover Legend"	21 April 2014
Tim and Fuzz go to South Yorkshire for a Series 1 Land Rover that has not been driven in 16 years.
16	6	"Start the Dart"	28 April 2014
Tim and Fuzz go to Berkshire for a Daimler SP250 Dart which has been in a shed for over 10 years.
17	7	"Morris Traveller Mayday"	5 May 2014
Tim and Fuzz go to Leighton Buzzard in Bedfordshire to help finish restoring a 1968 Morris Traveller.
18	8	"Danish Dilemma"	12 May 2014
Tim and Fuzz go to Denmark to fix a 1968 Volvo Amazon, that's been in the same family for over 45 years.
19	9	"Escort RS in Distress"	19 May 2014
Tim and Fuzz travel to Dorset to restore a 1980s Ford Escort RS 1600i.
20	10	"Campervan Challenge"	26 May 2014
Tim and Fuzz go to Hartlepool to restore a 1971 classic VW T2 Type 2 camper van.

=== Series 3 (2015) ===
No. overall	No. in season	Title	Original release date
21	1	"E-Type Emergency"	9 April 2015
Tim and Fuzz restore an injured man's Jaguar E-Type.
22	2	"Awesome Audi"	16 April 2015
Tim and Fuzz restore a 1984 Audi UR Quattro in Brighton. Good Rally Car!!!
23	3	"Stirling Moss Sprite Special"	23 April 2015
Tim and Fuzz restore a historic Austin-Healey Sprite, which has been in a garage since 1968. Racer Sir Stirling Moss appears and drives the completed car.
24	4	"Morgan Mayhem"	30 April 2015
Tim and Fuzz go to Northumberland for a 1934 Morgan F4 three-wheeler, which has been in a shed for over 50 years.
25	5	"Skyline Sensation"	7 May 2015
In Hampshire, Tim and Fuzz convert a collision-damaged 1995 Nissan Skyline R33 GT-R that has been kept in a shed.
26	6	"Alfa Romeo Renaissance"	14 May 2015
Tim and Fuzz restore a 1963 Alfa Romeo Giulia Spider, a two-seater convertible that has been kept in a dusty barn in Essex.
27	7	"Tim's Golf GTI Obsession"	21 May 2015
Tim and Fuzz go to Hampshire to repair a 1982 VW Golf GTI Mk1 that has been kept in a garage since a road collision in 2001.
28	8	"Lancia Reborn"	28 May 2015
Tim and Fuzz try to restore a 1967 Lancia Flavia coupé, that has been kept for over 30 years in a Rochdale garage.
29	9	"Little Black Corvette"	4 June 2015
Tim and Fuzz restore 1974 Chevrolet Corvette Stingray in Essex.
30	10	"Vive La Citroën"	11 June 2015
Tom and Fuzz go Eastbourne in East Sussex for a 1954 Citroën Traction Avant belonging to former watchmaker and classic car lover.

=== Series 4 (2016) ===
No. overall	No. in season	Title	Original release date
31	1	"Volvo P1800"	7 April 2016
Tim, Fuzz and Sir Roger Moore restore Peter's 1964 Volvo P1800.
32	2	"AC Aceca"	14 April 2016
Tim and Fuzz are off to Leeds to take on a little British sports car, the AC Aceca.
33	3	"BMW 2002 Turbo"	21 April 2016
A Car S.O.S. call comes in for a BMW 2002 Turbo.
34	4	"Datsun 240Z"	28 April 2016
Tim and Fuzz go to West Sussex to salvage a Datsun 240Z engine.
35	5	"Range Rover Vogue SE"	5 May 2016
Tim and Fuzz restore a 1991 Range Rover.
36	6	"Mazda MX5"	12 May 2016
Tim and Fuzz restore a sports car for a former ambulance driver in Plymouth, who was forced to abandon the project for health reasons.
37	7	"Singer Le Mans"	19 May 2016
Tim and Fuzz restore a two-seater Singer Le Mans sports car that has not been on the road for 17 years.
38	8	"Vauxhall Astra GTE"	26 May 2016
Tim and Fuzz restore a General Motors Vauxhall Astra GTE.
39	9	"Mini Cooper S"	2 June 2016
Tim and Fuzz go to Eastbourne to secretly restore a 1962 Mini Cooper S into a replica of the Monte Carlo-winning #37.
40	10	"Shaw and Townshend's Greatest Hits"	9 June 2016
Tim and Fuzz take a tour of the UK, to visit their favourite cars and owners from previous shows. Includes previously un-seen clips.

=== Series 5 (2017) ===
No. overall	No. in season	Title	Original release date
41	1	"Mercedes Pagoda"	16 March 2017
Tim and Fuzz restore a 1965 Mercedes 230 SL "Pagoda".
42	2	"Jaguar Mark 2"	23 March 2017
Tim and Fuzz restore a classic 1962 Mark 2 Jaguar 2.4 litre.
43	3	"Aston Martin DB6"	30 March 2017
Tim and Fuzz secretly restore an Aston Martin DB6.
44	4	"Fiat Dino"	6 April 2017
Tim and Fuzz restore a Fiat Dino.
45	5	"Renault 5 GT Turbo"	13 April 2017
Tim and Fuzz Fix a 1988 Renault 5 GT Turbo For carpet supplier, Ben who had to abandon his project since he contracted cancer. Will they be able to fix it?
46	6	"Fiat 500"	20 April 2017
Tim and Fuzz restore a Fiat 500 with terminal rust. Tim and Fuzz travel to Italy to pick up aTownshend and Shaw better shell.
47	7	"Sunbeam Alpine"	27 April 2017
Tim and Fuzz restore a rusty, badly repaired 1960 Sunbeam Alpine.
48	8	"Caterham 7"	4 May 2017
Tim and Fuzz restore a former amateur racer's Caterham 7.
49	9	"Austin Tilly Truck"	11 May 2017
Tim and Fuzz restore a former soldier's army truck that has been used as a farm vehicle for 60 years.
50	10	"Mazda RX-7"	18 May 2017
Tim and Fuzz secretly restore a Mazda RX-7.

=== Series 6 (2018) ===
No. overall	No. in season	Title	Original release date
51	1	"MG MGA"	8 March 2018
Tim and Fuzz are joined by James Nesbitt to restore a 1959 MGA roadster that has been kept in a damp barn for over 40 years.
52	2	"Lancia Delta Integrale Evoluzione II"	15 March 2018
Tim and Fuzz secretly fix up an Italian car enthusiast's rusty World Rally-winning Lancia Delta Integrale Evoluzione II. Note: For the first time in the programme the car's owner died unexpectedly before the car is returned to him, but the family requested they complete the restoration.
53	3	"VW Karmann Ghia"	22 March 2018
Tim and Fuzz restore a 1965 VW Karmann Ghia
54	4	"Triumph GT6"	29 March 2018
Tim and Fuzz secretly restore a 1971 Triumph GT6 for its injured owner.
55	5	"Citroën DS"	5 April 2018
Tim and Fuzz go to France to restore a Rogers Citroën DS.
56	6	"Toyota FJ40 Land Cruiser"	12 April 2018
Tim and Fuzz secretly restore a Toyota FJ40 Land Cruiser for its injured owner.
57	7	"Peugeot 205 GTI"	19 April 2018
Tim and Fuzz are joined by racer Paddy Hopkirk to restore a Peugeot 205 GTI.
58	8	"Subaru Impreza"	26 April 2018
Tim and Fuzz secretly restore an injured man's Subaru Impreza.
59	9	"Messerschmitt KR200"	3 May 2018
Tim and Fuzz secretly restore a Messerschmitt KR200.
60	10	"Ford Capri"	10 May 2018
Tim and Fuzz secretly restore a 1974 Mk 1 Ford Capri.

=== 7 Day Challenge Special (2019) ===
No. overall	No. in season	Title	Original release date
61	1	"1959 Land Rover Part 1"	14 February 2019
Tim and Fuzz are joined by Ross Kemp to restore a Series 2 Land Rover under a one week deadline in front of a live audience at the British Motor Museum.
62	2	"1959 Land Rover Part 2"	21 February 2019
Tim and Fuzz are joined by musician Rick Wakeman to restore 80-year-old's 1959 Land Rover.

=== Series 7 (2019) ===
No. overall	No. in season	Title	Original release date
63	1	"Triumph TR4"	28 February 2019
Tim and Fuzz fix up a Triumph TR4, one of the biggest jobs in the show's history.
64	2	"Toyota Celica"	7 March 2019
Tim and Fuzz restore a 1972 Toyota Celica coupe.
65	3	"Lotus Elise"	14 March 2019
Tim and Fuzz secretly restore a Lotus Elise.
66	4	"Ford Model A"	21 March 2019
Tim and Fuzz restore An injured motorcyclist's 1930 Ford Model A
67	5	"Peugeot 504"	28 March 2019
Tim and Fuzz Asked to secretly restore a 1971 Peugeot 504 convertible.
68	6	"Talbot Sunbeam Lotus"	4 April 2019
Tim and Fuzz go to Forfar in Scotland for a former fire fighter's rare Sunbeam Lotus.
69	7	"Lamborghini Espada"	11 April 2019
Tim and Fuzz restore a 1971 V12 Lamborghini Espada The show's first Lamborghini V12 supercar.
70	8	"Volkswagen Transporter (T4)"	18 April 2019
Tim and Fuzz restore a 1991 VW T4 Camper van.
71	9	"Ford Escort"	25 April 2019
Tim and Fuzz travel to Jersey for a 1972 Ford Escort Mexico.
72	10	"Citroën 2CV"	2 May 2019
Tim and Fuzz restore a 1983 Citroën 2CV.

=== Series 8 (2020–2021) ===
No. overall	No. in season	Title	Original release date
73	1	"Porsche 356"	12 March 2020
Tim and Fuzz restore a 1964 Porsche 356.
74	2	"Austin-Healey 3000"	19 March 2020
Tim and Fuzz restore a 1961 Austin-Healey 3000.
75	3	"Lotus Esprit"	26 March 2020
Tim and Fuzz restore a 1970's sports car, a Lotus Esprit.
76	4	"Hillman Imp"	5 April 2020
Tim and Fuzz restore a 1973 Hillman Imp.
77	5	"Lancia Fulvia"	12 April 2020
Tim and Fuzz restore a Lancia Fulvia.
78	6	"Ferguson Tractor"	19 April 2020
Tim and Fuzz restore a 1940s Ferguson TE20 Tractor.
79	7	"Mitsubishi Lancer Evolution IV"	26 April 2020
Tim and Fuzz restore a 1996 Mitsubishi Lancer Evolution IV.
80	8	"Austin 7 Chummy"	3 May 2020
Tim and Fuzz restore a 1924 Austin 7 Chummy.
81	9	"Cannon Goldfinger"	10 May 2020
Tim and Fuzz restore a 1964 Cannon Goldfinger trials competition car.
82	10	"MG Metro 6R4"	11 March 2021
Tim and Fuzz restore a 1986 MG Metro 6R4 rally car. Note: This episode was originally due to air on 17 May 2020, but production was delayed due to the COVID-19 pandemic.

=== Series 9 (2021) ===
No. overall	No. in season	Title	Original release date
83	1	"1969 Jensen Interceptor mkI"	18 March 2021
Tim and Fuzz restore a Jensen Interceptor.
84	2	"1989 Bertone X1/9 Gran Finale"	25 March 2021
Tim and Fuzz restore a Fiat X1/9. Note: For the second time in the programme the car's owner died unexpectedly before the car is returned to him, but the family requested they complete the restoration.
85	3	"1970 VW Beetle Wizard"	1 April 2021
Tim and Fuzz restore a VW Wizard.
86	4	"1980 Jaguar XJ-S V12 5.3"	8 April 2021
Tim and Fuzz restore a Jaguar XJ-S.
87	5	"1929 Rolls-Royce 20HP Doctors Coupé"	15 April 2021
Tim and Fuzz restore a Rolls-Royce.
88	6	"1998 Peugeot 106 Rallye 1.6i"	22 April 2021
Tim and Fuzz restore a Peugeot 106.
89	7	"1978 Bedford HA 110 Ice Cream Van"	29 April 2021
Tim and Fuzz restore a Bedford HA Ice Cream Van.
90	8	"1972 Alpine-Renault A110 1300 (VC)"	6 May 2021
Tim and Fuzz restore an Alpine A110.
91	9	"1973 Ford Cortina mk3 1600 XL"	13 May 2021
Tim and Fuzz restore a Ford MK3 Cortina GT.
92	10	"1970 Bond Bug 700ES"	20 May 2021
Tim and Fuzz restore a Bond Bug.

=== Series 10 (2022) ===
No. overall	No. in season	Title	Original release date
93	1	"1988 Fiat Uno Turbo"	10 March 2022
Tim and Fuzz restore a Fiat Uno Turbo.
94	2	"Saab 900 Turbo"	17 March 2022
Tim and Fuzz restore a Saab 900 Turbo.
95	3	"Ford Escort RS2000"	24 March 2022
Tim and Fuzz restore a Ford Escort RS2000.
96	4	"VW Corrado"	31 March 2022
Tim and Fuzz restore a VW Corrado.
97	5	"1973 Dennis D-Series Fire Engine"	7 April 2022
Tim and Fuzz are off to Kent to rescue a 1973 Dennis Fire Engine belonging to firefighter James, who lost his father to cancer.
98	6	"Toyota Supra Mk4"	14 April 2022
Tim and Fuzz restore a Toyota Supra Mk4.
99	7	"Opel Manta"	21 April 2022
Tim and Fuzz restore an Opel Manta.
100	8	"Citroën Hy Van"	28 April 2022
Tim and Fuzz restore a Citroen Hy Van.
101	9	"Vauxhall Cavalier"	5 May 2022
Tim and Fuzz restore a Vauxhall Cavalier.
102	10	"MGB GT"	12 May 2022
Tim and Fuzz restore a MGB GT.

=== Series 11 (2023) ===
No. overall	No. in season	Title	Original release date
103	1	"Ford Mondeo"	9 March 2023
Tim and Fuzz convert a 2000 Ford Mondeo into a tribute race car.
104	2	"Rover SD1"	16 March 2023
Tim and Fuzz restore a 1986 Rover SD1.
105	3	"Jeep Grand Cherokee"	23 March 2023
Tim and Fuzz restore a 2002 Jeep Grand Cherokee.
106	4	"Porsche 911 Targa"	30 March 2023
Tim and Fuzz restore a 1973 Porsche 911 Targa.
107	5	"Riley RMF"	6 April 2023
Tim and Fuzz restore a 1953 Riley RMF.
108	6	"Renault Alpine GTA"	13 April 2023
Tim and Fuzz restore a 1987 Renault Alpine GTA.
109	7	"JCB"	20 April 2023
Tim and Fuzz restore a 1978 JCB 3C digger.
110	8	"Ford Mustang"	27 April 2023
Tim and Fuzz restore a first generation Ford Mustang.
111	9	"Toyota MR2"	4 May 2023
Tim and Fuzz restore a MK1 Toyota MR2.
112	10	"Ultima Mk3"	11 May 2023
Tim and Fuzz restore a 1989 Ultima Mk3.

=== Series 12 (2024) ===
No. overall	No. in season	Title	Original release date
113	1	"Ford Pop Hot Rod"	7 March 2024
Tim and Fuzz work their magic on a Ford Pop Hot Rod.
114	2	"Datsun 240k Skyline"	14 March 2024
Tim and Fuzz save the Datsun. With only two examples on the road, will Tim find the parts?
115	3	"BMW E30 Alpina"	21 March 2024
Is it a genuine Alpina? Tim goes on a mission to confirm the cars history, while Fuzz restores this fine example of a modern classic.
116	4	"Ford Fiesta XR2"	28 March 2024
The tricksters are back - teasing the family with the factory colour while working on the XR2.
117	5	"Honda CR-X"	4 April 2024
Tim and Fuzz restore a 32-year-old Honda CR-X.
118	6	"Citroen SM"	11 April 2024
Tim and Fuzz restore a 1973 Citroen SM.
119	7	"TVR Grantura"	18 April 2024
Tim and Fuzz restore a 1962 TVR Grantura
120	8	"VW Golf GTI Mk 2"	25 April 2024
Tim and Fuzz restore a 1980s VW Golf GTi Mk2
121	9	"Triumph TR7"	2 May 2024
Tim and Fuzz restore a 1970s Triumph TR7
122	10	"Lexus IS200"	9 May 2024
Tim and Fuzz turn a Lexus IS200 into a drift car

=== Series 13 (2025) ===
No. overall	No. in season	Title	Original release date
123	1	"Mazda MX5"	13 March 2025
Tim and Fuzz take on the world’s worst Mazda MX5, held together by rust. Can they turn it back into the ultimate roadster and give back a car with huge sentimental value.
124	2	"Toyota Celica GT4"	20 March 2025
Tim and Fuzz take on Michaels 1992 Toyota Celica, a rare road going version of the 90’s world rally championship winning car driven by Carlos Sainz.
125	3	"Beach Buggy"	27 March 2025
Tim and Fuzz take on a wreck of a VW Dune Buggy, owned by a devoted Father of three from East Yorkshire.
126	4	"Wolseley Hornet"	3 April 2025
Fuzz leads the restoration of a rare Wolseley Hornet, a sporty little number from the 1930s, while Tim aims to inspire a new generation into loving vintage cars.
127	5	"Ford Escort XR3i cabriolet"	10 April 2025
It’s the battle of the Convertible v Hard top, as Tim and Fuzz take a Ford Escort XR3i cabriolet and turn it back into a hot hatch icon of the 80’s.
128	6	"Land Rover Discovery"	17 April 2025
Tim and Fuzz restore a Land Rover Discovery Series 1, which is rotting in a field. With a project this huge, Tim pulls off a big celebrity finale.
129	7	"BMW M3 E46"	24 April 2025
Tim and Fuzz restore a BMW M3 E46 that’s been off the road for 10 years. They must fix major mechanical issues and create the ultimate CSL replica.
130	8	"Polo G40"	1 May 2025
TBC
131	9	"Suzuki Jimny"	8 May 2025
TBC
132	10	"Ferrari 308 GTS"	15 May 2025
TBC

=== Series 14 (2026) ===
No. overall	No. in season	Title	Original release date
133	1	"Austin-Healey Frogeye Sprite"	13 March 2026
TBC Note: Joanna Lumley helps Tim and Fuzz with the car reveal at the end of the episode.
134	2	"Mercedes SLK"	20 March 2026
TBC
135	3	"Triumph Bonneville"	27 March 2026
TBC
136	4	"Volkswagen Golf Mk1"	3 April 2026
TBC
137	5	"Austin Mini Mayfair"	10 April 2026
TBC
138	6	"Nissan Pulsar GTi-R"	17 April 2026
TBC
139	7	"Alfa Romeo Spider"	24 April 2026
TBC
140	8	"Land Rover Defender"	1 May 2026
TBC
141	9	"Rover P4 100"	8 May 2026
TBC
142	10	"Lamborghini Silhouette"	15 May 2026
TBC
