= Very Metal Noise Pollution =

EP by Pop Will Eat Itself
- Released: August 1989
- Label: RCA

EP chronology
Poppiecock (1986)	Very Metal Noise Pollution (1989)	Amalgamation (1994)

Very Metal Noise Pollution is an EP released by British Grebo band Pop Will Eat Itself between their albums This Is the Day...This Is the Hour...This Is This! and Cure for Sanity. It was released in a very large range of different CD, vinyl, and cassette formats all containing the identical track listing. The EP reached 45 on the Official UK Charts.

"PWEI-zation" is a fast-paced track which didn't appear on an album until the re-release of This Is the Day..., however, in addition to Very Metal Noise Pollution, it also appeared on the 1992 single "Karmadrome".

"92°F" appears on Cure for Sanity in a remixed form featuring Sylvia Tella on lead vocals. Later, it was released as its own single, but this version was not present on the single, which featured remixes by Boilerhouse. The original version was exclusive to the Very Metal Noise Pollution EP until the re-release of the This Is The Day... in 2011.

The version of "Def.Con.One" that appears on Very Metal Noise Pollution is identical to the one on the This Is the Day... album.

Likewise, "Preaching to the Perverted" is as it appears on This Is the Day..., except separated from the songs on either side on the album.

== Critical reception ==
Geoff Zeppelin of Record Mirror have issued a moderate review on this mini-album and noted that performance of Sylvia Tella makes her less famous in comparison with hers efforts in The Blow Monkeys. David Giles, Music Week reviewer, found new tracks of EP "still witty and irreverent but more song-based".

== Track listing ==
1. "PWEI-zation" 3:10
2. "92°F" 3:36
3. "Def.Con.One 1989AD" 3:59
4. "Preaching to the Perverted" 4:19
