= Touched by the Hand of Cicciolina =

Single by Pop Will Eat Itself

from the album Cure for Sanity
- Released: 29 May 1990
- Recorded: January 1990
- Length: 7:42 (Album version); 4:37 (Single version)
- Label: RCA
- Songwriter: Vestan Pance (band)

Pop Will Eat Itself singles chronology
| "Wise Up! Sucker" (1989) | "Touched by the Hand of Cicciolina" (1990) | "Dance of the Mad" (1990) |

"Touched by the Hand of Cicciolina" is a 1990 song by the band Pop Will Eat Itself from their album Cure for Sanity. The song is about Hungarian-Italian porn actress Ilona Staller by the stage name Cicciolina.

== Background ==
The song was written by Vestan Pance, recorded in January 1990 and released as a single in May 1990. It features samples from David Bowie's "Sound and Vision", Funkadelic's "Good Old Music" and the album version of the Human League's "Being Boiled". The song entered the UK Singles Chart and remained for four weeks, peaking at No. 28. The sticker claimed that this song was the "unofficial World Cup Theme", referencing the 1990 FIFA World Cup.

A music video was created in which Cicciolina also makes a cameo appearance. The album version of the song is subtitled "(edited highlights)", despite the fact that the single is some three minutes shorter than the album version. The single was issued in various formats (7-inch vinyl, cassette, 12-inch vinyl, and compact disc). Regardless of format, the various versions contained no songs other than "Cicciolina", with that song being presented in either two or three different mix versions. Renegade Soundwave made a remix in 1990, followed by another by Flood.
