= Ich Bin Ein Auslander =

1994 single by Pop Will Eat Itself

"Ich bin ein Auslander"

Single by Pop Will Eat Itself

from the album Dos Dedos Mis Amigos
- Released: 28 February 1994
- Length: 3:59
- Label: Infectious; Interscope; Nothing
- Songwriter(s): Clint Mansell, Pance
- Producer(s): Pop Will Eat Itself

Pop Will Eat Itself singles chronology
"RSVP / Familius Horribilus" (1993)	"Ich bin ein Auslander" (1994)	"Everything's Cool?" (1994)

"Ich bin ein Auslander" (German for 'I am a foreigner', German spelling Ich bin ein Ausländer) is a single by Pop Will Eat Itself released in 1994 from the album Dos Dedos Mis Amigos. The song peaked at number 28 on the UK Singles Chart in 1994. The song's lyrics refer to English attitudes towards immigration.
