= A Lick of the Old Cassette Box =

Studio album by Pop Will Eat Itself
- Released: 23 September 2013
- Recorded: 1995–1996
- Genre: Industrial rock
- Label: Cherry Red Records

Pop Will Eat Itself chronology
New Noise Designed by a Sadist (2011)	A Lick of the Old Cassette Box (2013)	Anti-Nasty League (2015)

A Lick of the Old Cassette Box a.k.a. The Lost Album is an album by the British industrial rock/alternative dance band Pop Will Eat Itself originally recorded in 1995 and 1996, but not released until September 2013. It was originally intended to become the band's sixth album, and their second on Nothing Records, but did not get released due to the band breaking up that year.

The album was released on CD as disc two of a remastered re-release of the band's previous album Dos Dedos Mis Amigos. It was also released separately on orange vinyl, limited to 200 copies.

== Music ==
Louder Than War said that "within the grooves" is evidence which suggests the band "had the potential to challenge for the popular industrial crossover crown subsequently seized by The Prodigy who went on to fill stadiums across the globe and sell records by the millions."

== Reception ==
Phil Newall of Louder Than War was favourable, saying the album is "good", but noted "I'm just not sure it's PWEI", feeling that if the record was released upon completion, it could have sacrificed some of their original audience in favour of a stronger industrial audience in the United States. He said "I do not expect a band to remain within their established groove, and PWEI had already indicated where they were heading but this just sounds like they were trying too hard, they were understandably keen to crack the lucrative US industrial market, but I would suggest that in their efforts they may well have alienated their core fan base – that said it’s great to hear this album, it is full of ideas, of invention, it’s an insight into how PWEI may have and deserves to be released." He described "The Demon" as a "personal favourite", stating it "had me thinking I was listening to a Revolting Cocks bootleg, real power house built around a looping bass and minor keys with a skip full of sequenced noise piled on top."

== Track listing ==
1. "No Contest"
2. "Hangman"
3. "Dehydration"
4. "Out of Darkness Cometh Light"
5. "The Demon"
6. "100% is Shit"
7. "1-800-Outsider"
8. "I am the One"
9. "Talent Plus Attitude Equals Dollars"
10. "Point Blank: Zero Return"
11. "Big Green Head"
12. "I'm Gonna Get Ya Baby"

== Personnel ==
Pop Will Eat Itself

- Graham Crabb – Vocals
- Clint Mansell – Vocals
- Adam Mole – Guitar
- Richard March – Guitar
- Robert "Fuzz" Townshend – Drums
- Dr. Nightmare – Drum machine
- Kerry Hammond – guitars
