= Everything's Cool (song) =

"Everything's Cool?"
- UK CD1 cover

Single by Pop Will Eat Itself

from the album Dos Dedos Mis Amigos
- Released: 30 August 1994
- Length: 4:17
- Label: Infectious; Nothing; Interscope
- Songwriter(s): Clint Mansell
- Producer(s): Pop Will Eat Itself; Bryan "Chuck" New

Pop Will Eat Itself singles chronology
| "Ich bin ein Auslander" (1994) | "Everything's Cool?" (1994) |

UK CD2 cover

"Everything's Cool?" is a song by English industrial rock band Pop Will Eat Itself, released on 30 August 1994 as the third and final single from their fifth studio album, Dos Dedos Mis Amigos. The CD version of the single includes several live performances recorded at the Aston Villa Leisure Centre on 12 and 13 March 1994 during the band's Amalgamation tour. The song peaked at number 23 on the UK Singles Chart and number 97 in Australia.

== Track listing ==
CD: Infectious / Infect 9CD (UK) Part One

1. "Everything's Cool?" – 4:20
2. "Ich bin ein Auslander" (live) – 5:42
3. "Familus Horribilus" (live) – 4:03
4. "R.S.V.P." (Live)" – 3:41

CD: Infectious / Infect 9CDX (UK) Part Two

1. "Everything's Cool?" (Youth 7-inch) – 4:12
2. "Everything's Cool?" (Safe as Milk mix) – 10:55
3. "Everything's Cool?" (Dragonfly mix) – 4:09
4. "R.S.V.P. (Supper)" – 5:28

Orange 7-inch: Infectious / Infect 9SO (UK) Part One

1. "Everything's Cool"
2. "Let It Flow"

Green 7-inch: Infectious / Infect 9SG (UK) Part Two

1. "Everything's Cool"
2. "Wild West"
