= New Noise Designed by a Sadist =

Studio album by Pop Will Eat Itself
- Released: 3 October 2011
- Label: Cooking Vinyl
- Producer: Graham Crabb

Pop Will Eat Itself chronology
Dos Dedos Mis Amigos (1994)	New Noise Designed by a Sadist (2011)	A Lick of the Old Cassette Box (2013)

Professional ratings
Review scores
Source	Rating
AllMusic	3/5 stars

New Noise Designed by a Sadist is the sixth studio album by English industrial rock band Pop Will Eat Itself, released on 3 October 2011 by Cooking Vinyl. It was the band's first original studio album in over seventeen years, after Dos Dedos Mis Amigos (1994).

== Musical style ==
New Noise Designed by a Sadist is said to "bear all the hallmarks" of the band's heyday. The best examples are said to be "Equal Zero", whose "buzzing guitar hooks, swirling techno bleeps, and clattering beats" have been said to "could have sat" alongside the band's 1994 collaboration with The Prodigy, "Their Law", and "Wasted (Pt. 1)", whose "snarling vocals, industrial riffs, and scuzzy guitars" are reminiscent of John Lydon's electronica work.

== Track listing ==
All tracks are written by Graham Crabb, except where noted.

1. "Back 2 Business" – 1:18
2. "Chaos & Mayhem" (Adam Mole, Fuzz Townshend) – 3:40
3. "Nosebleeder Turbo TV" (Mole, Rice) – 4:02
4. "Captain Plastic" – 3:09
5. "Mask" – 5:06
6. "Equal Zero" – 4:38
7. "Oldskool Cool" (Mary Byker, Psychedelic Furs) – 5:08
8. "Seek & Destroy" (Mole) – 4:27
9. "Disguise" – 3:14
10. "Wasted (Part 1)" (David Nahmani) – 3:53
11. "Wasted (Reprise)" – 2:17

== Personnel ==
- Graham Crabb – vocals, guitar, programming
- Mary Byker – vocals
- Rob Holliday – additional guitar, bass
- Tim Muddiman – bass
- Jason Bowld – drums
- Steve Monti – additional programming
- Leif Kahal – guitar, end solo on "Oldskool Cool"
- David Nahmani – additional programming on "Wasted" (Part 1)
