= Fuzz Townshend =

British musician and presenter

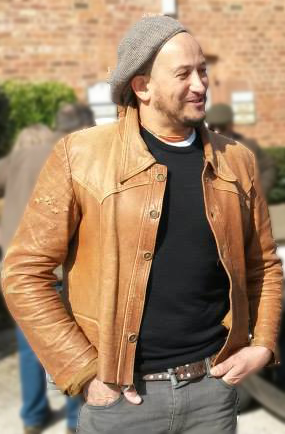
- Fuzz Townshend in 2015
- Born: John Richard Keith Townshend; 31 July 1964 (age 61); Birmingham, Warwickshire, England
- Occupations: Broadcaster; journalist; mechanic; musician
- Years active: 1980s–present
- Employers: Practical Classics; National Geographic Channel
- Television: Car SOS
- Spouses: Cressida (divorced); Karen (m. 2020)

John Richard Keith "Fuzz" Townshend (born 31 July 1964) is a British drummer, TV presenter of National Geographic Channel's Car SOS (also shown on Channel 4/More4), motoring journalist for Classic Car Weekly, former technical editor of Practical Classics, and mechanic. He is also honorary president of the Triumph Sports Six Club. He also had a solo music career from 1996 to 2002.

== The early years ==
Townshend's Afro hair was unique in his junior school and so, at seven years of age, his school friends renamed him Fuzz.

His mother won a Vauxhall Chevette in a national newspaper competition when he was ten; having never learned to drive, she instead opted to take the prize in cash and spent it buying her son a drum kit. After taking lessons from local jazz musician Al Reed, Townshend's stage debut was made in March 1977, aged just 12. By the end of the 1970s, Townshend had graduated to playing in clubs with college bands.

Townshend started an apprenticeship with the local bus company, the West Midlands Passenger Transport Executive, working on buses at the PTE's Dudley garage. During his time at Dudley, he recorded his first two John Peel Sessions for BBC Radio 1 and released his first single which made its way into the NME indie charts.

== Music ==
Townshend joined former Beat singer Ranking Roger and his band General Public, which later toured the US under the guise of 'Ranking Roger'. Local indie band Pop Will Eat Itself noticed him drumming with local acts and asked him to join. Townshend spent the next four and a half years drumming for the band, during which time they had successes in both the UK single and album charts and toured North America with Nine Inch Nails. Townshend started playing drums for the dance music outfit Bentley Rhythm Ace.

His first solo release, "Hello Darlin", was released in 1996, and he eventually signed to Echo Records, in July 1997. The record charted at number 51 in the UK. However, he was now able to make his first solo album, Far In, which was eventually released in the UK in 1999 and the US in 2001, the latter being on Stinky Records headed by chief MTV/VH1 lawyer Sabrina Silverberg. His second, self-titled album followed in 2002.

Townshend became a part-time college lecturer in 2004, lecturing in music practice and music technology and during this time, his old band PWEI decided to reform.

Townshend recently also drummed for The Wonder Stuff, and has previously played drums for The Beat (known in the U.S. as The English Beat).

== Writing career and garage ==
Townshend's first job in journalism was for Practical Classics, going on to become Technical Editor until March 2011, when he decided to go freelance, as well as starting a new classic car restoration business, Westgate Classics.

In 2014, Townshend founded Classic Friendly Ltd, a network of classic car-friendly garages, offering comprehensive safety inspections for MoT test-exempt classic cars as well as standardized servicing regimes. He is also about to launch an inspection scheme for auction and online auction cars under the same CFL umbrella. In April 2019, a message posted on the Facebook page Classic Friendly Ltd confirmed that Townshend had resigned from the business around one year earlier and that he had "no further dealings or influence with its direction or trading."

In the summer of 2016, Fuzz left Westgate Classics to set up a new garage, To-Ta Classics Ltd., in Oldbury, West Midlands. In 2018, To-Ta changed its name to SOS Workshop Ltd. The company dissolved in 2024.

== TV career ==
A TV production company invited Townshend to do a screen test audition for a new show, Car SOS, held at his then-business, Westgate Classics. He was given the position and his subsequent garages would feature as the show's location.

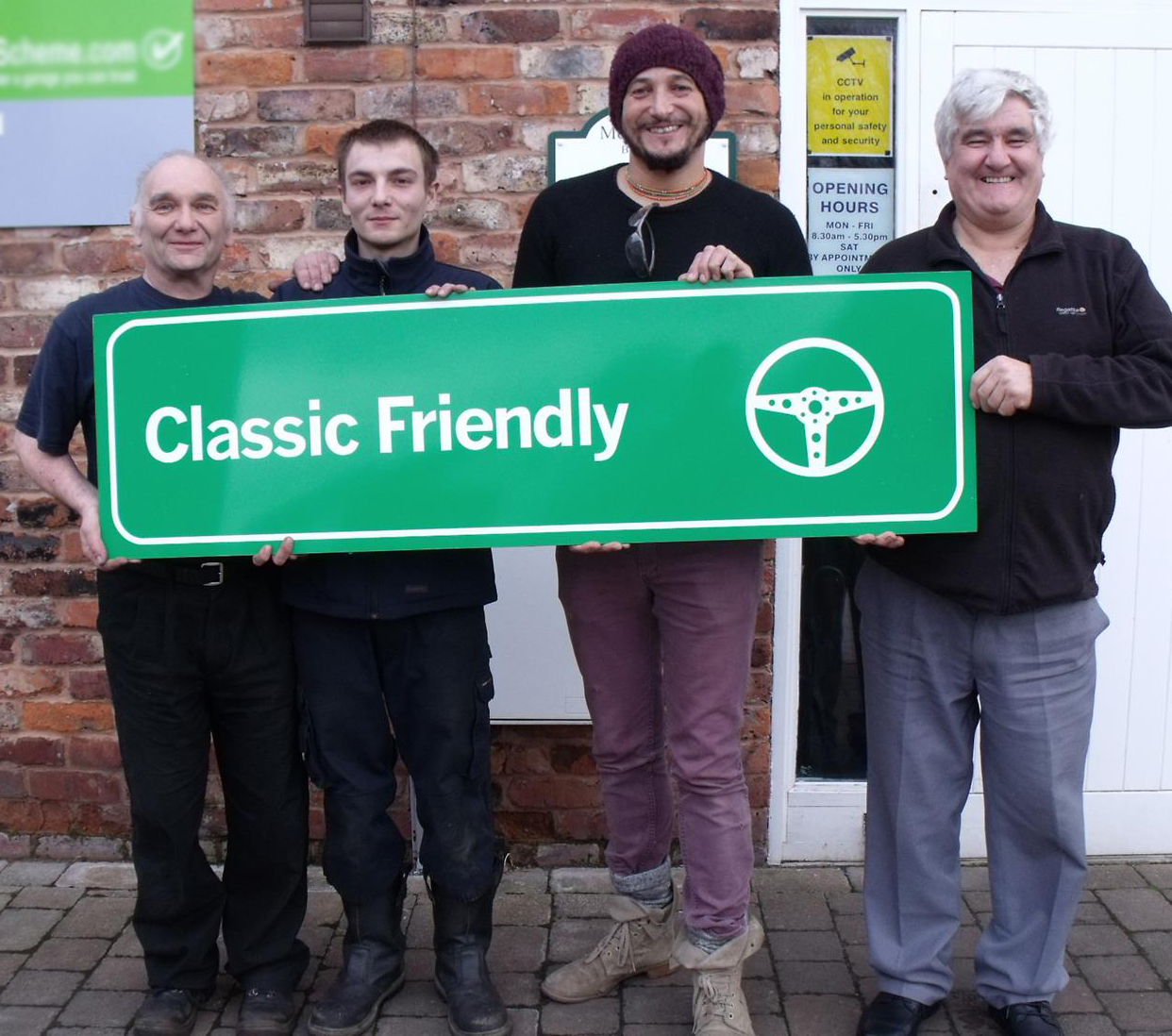
Townshend handing over Classic Friendly signage, an organization he founded and was associated with until 2018

Car SOS airs on National Geographic Channel (with re-runs airing on Channel 4/More4) in the UK, and in 2018 won a National Reality TV Award for "Most Inspirational Show".

Townshend is also a passionate supporter of 'Classic Aware', a new campaign promoting the importance of having one's classic vehicle properly checked: in the light of new legislation scrapping MoT requirements for classic vehicles that are over 40 years old.

He is based in Bishop's Castle, Shropshire and has regular features in Practical Classics magazine as well as Classic Car Weekly.

== Discography ==
=== Albums ===
- Far In (1999), Fruition
- Fuzz Townshend (2002), Stinky

=== Singles ===
- "Hello Darlin'" (1998), Fidelity Lo - UK no. 51
- "Get Yerself" (1998), Echo
- Tasty Big Ed (1998), Echo
- "Smash It" (1998), Echo
- "Dollar 97" (1999), Fidelity Lo - featuring Murphy
- "Bus" (1999), Fruition - featuring Noel
- "Y2K the Bug Is Coming" (1999), MBug - Ian Dury, Jim's Super Stereoworld & Fuzz Townshend

=== With Pop Will Eat Itself ===
- The Looks or the Lifestyle? (1992)
- Dos Dedos Mis Amigos (1994)
- A Lick of the Old Cassette Box - unreleased album (1996/2013)
