= Dos Dedos Mis Amigos =

Studio album by Pop Will Eat Itself
- Released: 19 September 1994
- Recorded: 1993–94
- Genre: Industrial rock; alternative rock; industrial metal
- Length: 47:03
- Label: Infectious; Nothing; Interscope
- Producer: Pop Will Eat Itself; Bryan "Chuck" New

Pop Will Eat Itself chronology
The Looks or the Lifestyle? (1992)	Dos Dedos Mis Amigos (1994)	New Noise Designed by a Sadist (2011)

Singles from Dos Dedos Mis Amigos
- 1. ""R.S.V.P. / "Familus Horribilus" Released: 4 October 1993; 2. "Ich Bin Ein Auslander" Released: 28 February 1994; 3. "Everything's Cool?" Released: 30 August 1994

Professional ratings
Review scores
Source	Rating
AllMusic	3/5 stars
Alternative Press	positive
Hot Press	8/12
Metal Hammer	6/7
NME	6/10
Record Collector	4/5 stars
Select	3/5 stars

Dos Dedos Mis Amigos is the fifth studio album by English industrial rock band Pop Will Eat Itself. It was released on 19 September 1994 in the United Kingdom by Infectious Records and in the United States by Nothing and Interscope Records. The album is somewhat different from the band's other albums, as it had more of an industrial influence and fewer samples were used. The cover art was created by longtime collaborators The Designers Republic. The album was the last before the band disbanded in 1996 (excluding the then unreleased album), until the reformed band released New Noise Designed by a Sadist in 2011, with a different line-up.

It was followed by an album of remixes, Two Fingers My Friends!, which is the English translation of "Dos Dedos Mis Amigos".

== Reception ==
Record Collector said it was "arguably their best" album, adding that several songs on their later album Anti-Nasty League (2015) "credibly hark back to the Poppies at their hard-hitting, Dos Dedos-era best."

== Track listing ==
1. "Ich Bin Ein Auslander" (Clint Mansell, Pance) – 3:59
2. "Kick to Kill" (Crabb) – 3:24
3. "Familus Horribilus" (Townshend, Crabb) – 4:03
4. "Underbelly" (Mansell, Pance) – 3:58
5. "Fatman" (Mansell, Pance) – 3:17
6. "Home" (Townshend, Crabb) – 3:36
7. "Cape Connection" (Crabb) – 4:59
8. "Menofearthereaper" (Crabb) – 6:27
9. "Everything's Cool" (Mansell, Pance) – 4:17
10. "R.S.V.P." (Crabb) – 3:32
11. "Babylon" (Crabb) – 5:04

Japanese edition bonus tracks

12. "Intense"
13. "C.P. I #2"
14. "Wild West"
15. "Let It Flow"

== Notes ==
- "Ich Bin Ein Auslander" translates as 'I'm a foreigner' in German, but the word should be spelled "Ausländer", with the umlaut.
- "Ich Bin Ein Auslander" contains a dry-sample guitar of Led Zeppelin's "Kashmir", while "Everything's Cool" contains samples from "Thieves" by Ministry and "Little Bird" by Annie Lennox. "Ich Bin Ein Auslander" also samples Brad Fiedel's theme tune to Terminator 2: Judgment Day.
- "Familus Horribilus" samples Black Sabbath's "Symptom of the Universe" from the album Sabotage.
- "Home" samples the bassline from Serge Gainsbourg's "Cargo Culte" from the album Histoire de Melody Nelson.
- This was the only PWEI album (excluding the Amalgamation EP) released on Trent Reznor's Nothing Records, although Clint Mansell would collaborate with Trent Reznor on various future projects.
- In 2001 Information Society lead singer Kurt Harland created a track called Ausoween by combining "Ich Bin Ein Auslander" and "This is Halloween" from the film The Nightmare Before Christmas.
- Several tracks from this release were featured in the soundtrack to the PlayStation video game Loaded.

== Charts ==
Chart (1994)	Peak position
Australian Albums (ARIA)	132
