= Pop Will Eat Itself =

Alternative rock band

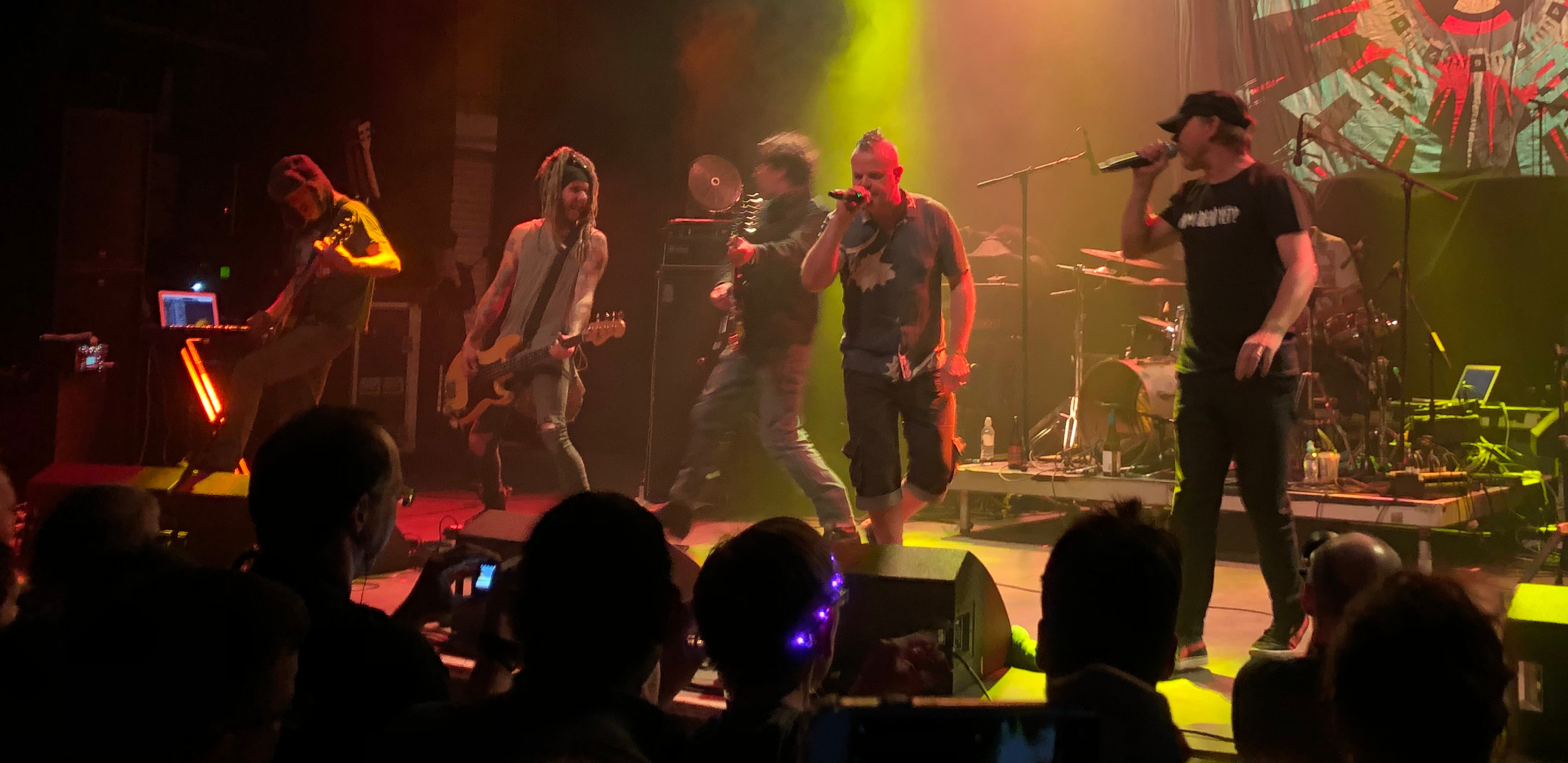
- Pop Will Eat Itself in 2019

Background information
- Also known as: PWEI; The Poppies
- Origin: Stourbridge, West Midlands, England
- Genres: Grebo (earlier); industrial rock (later)
- Years active: 1986–1996, 2005, 2010–present
- Labels: RCA, Infectious, Nothing
- Members: Graham Crabb; Mary Byker; Davey Bennett; Adam Mole; Cliff Hewitt
- Past members: Clint Mansell; Richard March; Fuzz Townshend; Kerry "The Buzzard" Hammond; Tim Muddiman; Jason Bowld

Pop Will Eat Itself (often abbreviated as PWEI) is an English alternative rock band formed in 1986 in Stourbridge in the West Midlands of England with members from Birmingham, Coventry and the Black Country. Initially known as a grebo act, they changed their style to incorporate sample-driven indie and industrial rock. Graham Crabb describes their sound as "electronic, punk, alternative hip-hop, hybrid music for fucking, fighting and smoking cigars". Their highest-charting single was the 1993 UK top-ten hit "Get the Girl! Kill the Baddies!". After initially disbanding in 1996 and briefly reforming in 2005, the band issued their first release in more than five years in 2010.

== Career ==
=== Early years: 1981–1988 ===
An early permutation of the band formed in 1981 under the name From Eden. Members included Clint Mansell, Adam Mole, Chris Fradgley, Malcolm Treece and Miles Hunt (Treece and Hunt later formed the Wonder Stuff). From Eden recruited Graham Crabb from Kit-Form Colossus to replace Hunt on drums before dissolving the band.

Crabb, Mole and Mansell recruited Richard March and changed their band name to Wild and Wandering, derived from a Wasted Youth album, before eventually becoming Pop Will Eat Itself in 1986. The new name was taken from a quotation in an NME article on Jamie Wednesday by David Quantick.

==== First single: "Poppies Say Grrr!" and tour ====
In 1986, the band released the "Poppies Say Grrr!" single, which became Single of the Week in the NME and was played by Janice Long on BBC Radio 1 and in the Midlands by John Slater on BRMB. The single was sold in a brown paper bag and was sold at Martin Newsagents in Stourbridge High Street as well as from the home of one of the band.

With their newfound popularity, the band began a six-week tour of Europe, often encountering hostility because their sets lasted less than half an hour, even though they played all 16 tracks in their repertoire.

==== Influences ====
During this time, the band was listening to more hip-hop (Run-DMC, Public Enemy and the Beastie Boys) as well as music from an emerging movement of sample-heavy dance records (The KLF, MARRS, S'Express and Bomb the Bass).

After hearing Robert Gordon's remix of their cover of Sigue Sigue Sputnik's "Love Missile F1-11" and Age of Chance's mini-LP Crush Collision (also engineered by Gordon), the band glimpsed their future as hip-hop/dance/rock pioneers and recorded their debut album, Box Frenzy, with Gordon at Sheffield's FON studios in June/July 1987. The band met the Designers Republic, with whom they partnered for many years. The album was released on manager Craig Jennings' Chapter 22 label. Jennings still manages the band to the present day along with the roster at his firm, Raw Power Management. Crabb, now more immersed in finding samples and songwriting, moved from the drums to become a vocalist alongside Mansell; he was replaced by a drum machine called Dr. Nightmare. March handled programming duties and became the band's expert in that area.

"Beaver Patrol", a cover of a Wilde Knights song (suggested to the band by Bobby Gillespie of Primal Scream), caused some controversy for its offensive lyrics, but "There Is No Love Between Us Anymore" appeared in the lower reaches of the UK chart. As a result, Pop Will Eat Itself were signed to the record label RCA. Whilst much confusion ensued around the dramatic change of direction, the band became the first Western independent group invited to play in the Soviet Union.

==== Chart success. ====
The band achieved UK Top 40 hits with "Can U Dig It?" and "Wise Up! Sucker" from their album This Is the Day...This Is the Hour...This Is This! In late 1988, PWEI were invited by Rush Management to support Run-DMC on their European tour. Main support act Public Enemy were becoming increasingly popular and their large and militant following booed all support acts from the stage, including PWEI, who left the tour when the situation deteriorated in Amsterdam.

=== The RCA years: 1989–1993 ===
Pop Will Eat Itself released three albums on RCA. The first two (This Is the Day...This Is the Hour...This Is This! and Cure for Sanity) were recorded with the aid of Flood, known for his work with Nine Inch Nails, U2 and Depeche Mode. The band toured extensively in the UK, continental Europe and the United States, including appearances at the Reading Festival. Their singles charted progressively higher, with each release charting inside the UK Top 40 from 1990 to 1994.

For the recording of the band's 1992 album The Looks or the Lifestyle?, Pop Will Eat Itself recruited John "Fuzz" Townshend as their drummer to complement their preprogrammed drums. The band had discussed adding a live drummer in 1990, but touring commitments made it impractical to do so until the band were able to break touring activity in late 1991 to commence recording. The album peaked at UK No. 15 and featured the Top 30 hit singles "Karmadrome" and "Bulletproof!" Despite healthy sales and widescale touring, the band's most ardent supporters at RCA had left the company by January 1993, and the remaining executives struggled to understand the band and their music, once suggesting that EMF write a hit for them. The band was dropped from the label before the "Get the Girl! Kill the Baddies!" single was released, but the song peaked at #9 in the UK Singles Chart, becoming the band's greatest hit and earning them the distinction as the highest-charting act to appear on Top of the Pops without a record deal. In an attempt to recoup their investment, the label released the live album Live at Weird's Bar and Grill, recorded in London in October 1992.

=== Industrial influence: 1994–1995 ===
PWEI's political stance became more explicit with the release of the single "Ich Bin Ein Auslander". A collaboration with Asian group Fun-Da-Mental, the song contains anti-Nazi lyrics and reached the UK Top 30. A different version of the song later appeared as the opening track on Pop Will Eat Itself's 1994 album Dos Dedos Mis Amigos. The album peaked at No. 11 in the UK Albums Chart and spawned the final single release of the band's first era, "Everything's Cool", which became their ninth Top 30 UK hit. The band also collaborated with the Prodigy on the track "Their Law", featured on the Prodigy's breakthrough second album Music for the Jilted Generation. The track's lyrics are a protest against the Criminal Justice and Public Order Act 1994, which was believed to have criminalised rave culture.

The band found some new popularity after signing with Trent Reznor's Nothing Records in the U.S. and touring with Nine Inch Nails, as well as having their songs included in the PlayStation game Loaded. In March 1995, the band released the Dos Dedos Mis Amigos remix album Two Fingers My Friends!, which features remixes by the Orb, Apollo 440 and Renegade Soundwave.

=== Disbanded: 1996 ===
Crabb left the band in December 1995, originally proposing to contribute in a non-touring capacity because of his parental commitments, but the band replaced him with Kerry Hammond on guitar and backing vocals, with Mansell taking full vocal duties. The band split in May 1996 (with 12 songs recorded and mixed in a state of near completion) and toured the UK briefly in June 1996 with a final live show at Roskilde. The band's set contained several unreleased songs from the unfinished album. Two tracks from this period were released, a cover version of Gary Numan's "Friends", released on the 1997 tribute album Random, and the instrumental track "Zero Return" on a magazine sampler. In 2013, the songs from the unfinished album were assembled into a bonus disc with the reissue of Dos Dedos Mis Amigos, comprising the unreleased 1996 album, now titled A Lick of the Old Cassette Box.. Crabb concentrated on his ambient side project Golden Claw Musics. After the rest of the band split in 1996, March and Townshend formed the big beat band Bentley Rhythm Ace. Townshend also released two solo albums and Mansell wrote film scores, including those for Requiem for a Dream, π, Doom, The Fountain, The Wrestler, Moon and Black Swan.

=== Reformation: 2005 ===
The band reformed to play their first gigs in eight years in Nottingham, Birmingham and London in January 2005. Ten minutes after the completion of each gig, double live albums of the performance could be purchased through the Instant Live service.

The band released a preview of new material called Sonic Noise Byte on 4 November 2005 as a torrent download for members of their official website. However, an announcement on the official website in March 2006 confirmed that Mansell and March would no longer be involved in the project because of other work commitments, effectively ending the PWEI reformation. The remaining band members continued as Vileevils and released the tracks "Retro Dreaming" and "Street Fightin" for download through the website.

A secret, one-night PWEI reunion was scheduled for the Vileevils show at Stourbridge Rock Cafe on 9 June 2007, but was foiled when Mansell was unable to obtain a visa in time to return to the UK. March appeared at the show, and, after the Vileevils set, they played the planned PWEI songs without Mansell.

Vileevils performed their final live date in December 2008 supporting Ned's Atomic Dustbin before recording an unreleased album, which was cancelled prior to release in 2010. Some songs from this record were rerecorded for the 2011 Pop Will Eat Itself album New Noise Designed by a Sadist.

=== New PWEI: 2010–2014 ===
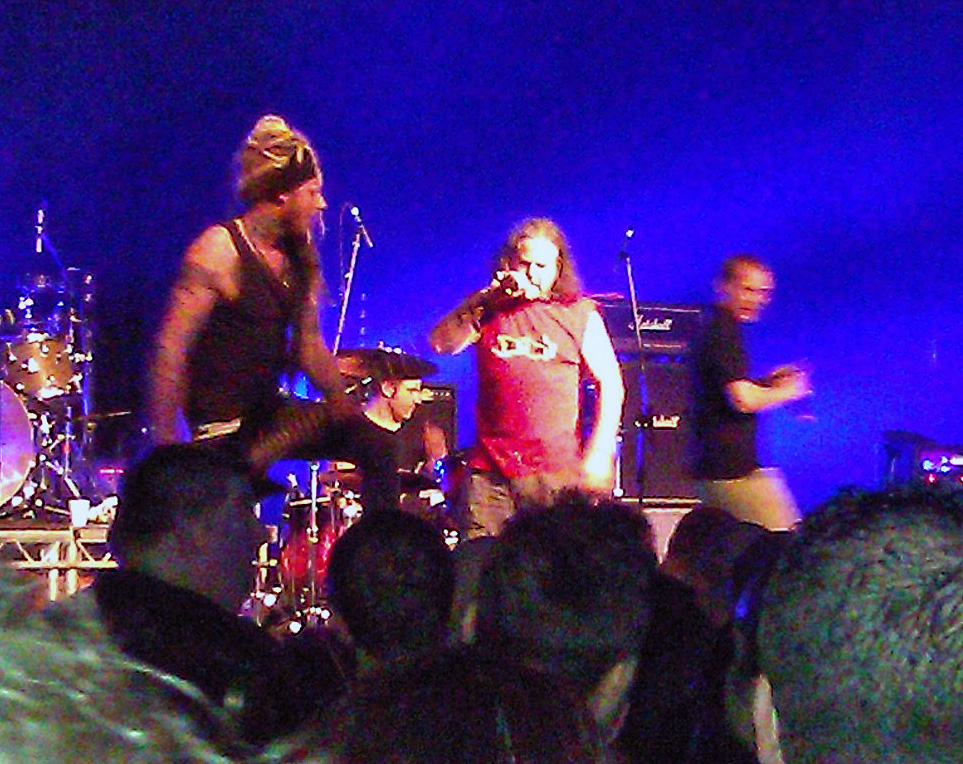
The 2012 incarnation of Pop Will Eat Itself performing live in Birmingham. Left to right: Davey Bennett (bass), Jason Bowld (drums), Graham Crabb (vocals), Mary Byker (vocals)

In 2010, with Vileevils winding down, Crabb released new material, "Axe of Men 2010", as PWEI for the first time since the Reformation. In July 2011, a new lineup was announced, featuring Crabb (as the only original member), fellow vocalist Mary Byker (Gaye Bykers on Acid, Apollo 440, Pigface), guitarist Tim Muddiman (Gary Numan), drummer Jason Bowld (Pitchshifter, Killing Joke) and bassist Davey Bennett (This Burning Age). In October, the album New Noise Designed by a Sadist was released on Cooking Vinyl, produced by Monti and Rob Holliday (Sulpher, the Prodigy) and was followed by a UK tour. The band further toured in March and December 2012. The single "Disguise" was featured as the Radio 6 breakfast show's single of the week, and the instrumental "Back to Business" was heard on Top Gear. Crabb and Byker also guested on Soccer AM. The band began working on a remix album to complement New Noise Designed by a Sadist, but the project was discontinued in favour of the Watch the Bitch Blow EP. The band toured the UK in December 2013 as part of a triple bill featuring the Wonder Stuff and Jesus Jones.

The Watch the Bitch Blow EP was released in March 2014 through PledgeMusic, and the "Reclaim the Game (Funk FIFA)" single featuring Brazilian rapper BNegão (Planet Hemp) followed in June 2014 for the 2014 FIFA World Cup as a protest song against FIFA.

=== Anti-Nasty League and return of original members: 2015–2024 ===
The album Anti-Nasty League was planned for release in September or October 2014 but was delayed to accommodate the band's live schedule in 2015. It was released exclusively and independently through the band's online store in April 2015. A nine-date UK tour was undertaken in May, and the band signed a publishing administration deal with Bucks Music Group for Anti-Nasty League.

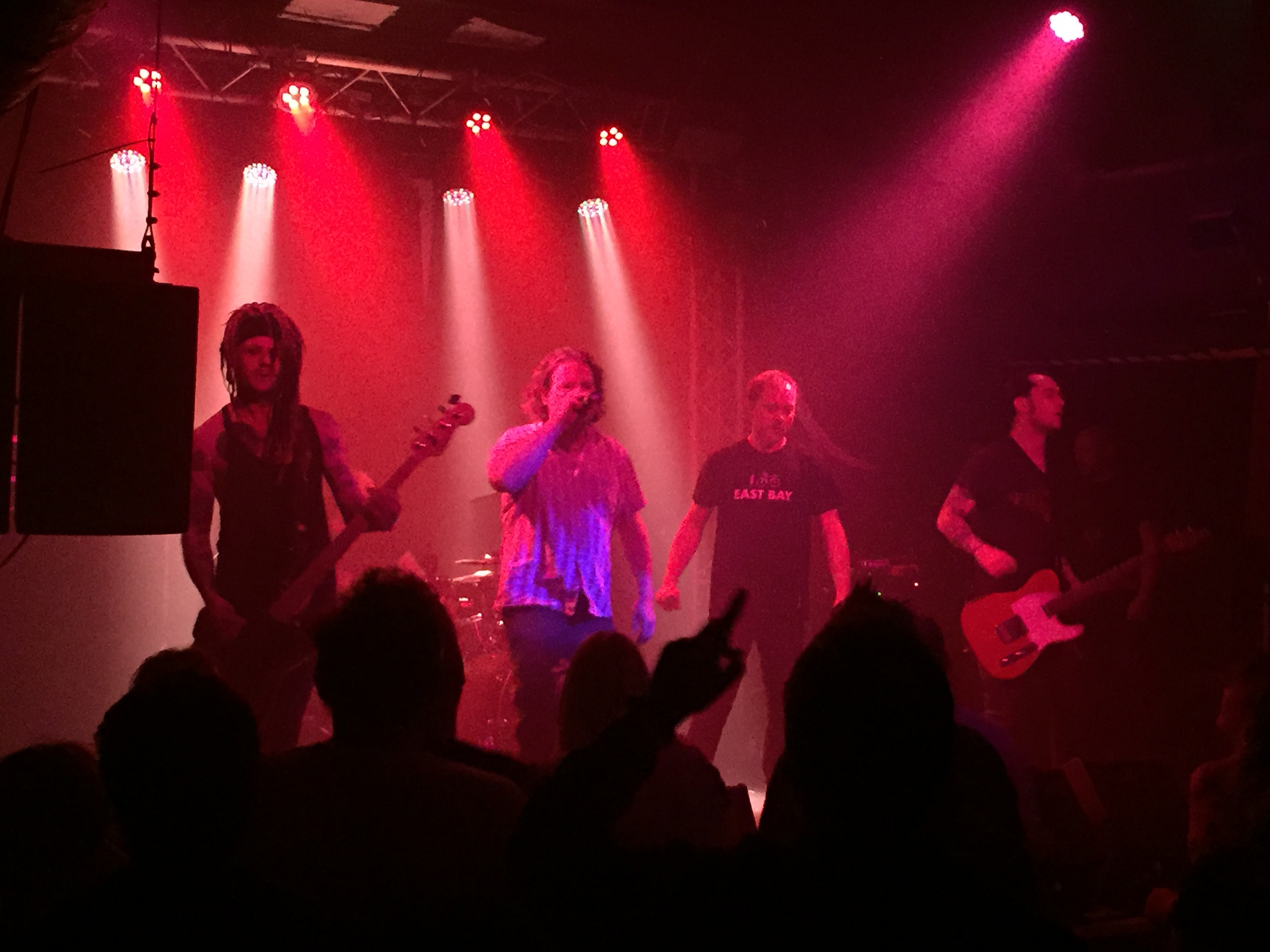
The band performing at the Thekla in Bristol in 2015

On 26 August 2016, PWEI headlined the opening day of Infest, with Fuzz Townshend rejoining on drums. Over the following years, they continued playing occasional concerts in the UK, with lineups varying between shows depending on the availability of the band members. In addition to Townshend, former band members Richard March and Adam Mole rejoined the band, resulting in a lineup nearly identical to that of the band's early years by 2018.

Seven years after its original release, Anti-Nasty League was made available digitally on the band's official store and major music streaming and download services. Two months later in June 2022, a new single, "The Poppies Strike Back", was released. A second, "Chihuahua", followed in September. It was the first new music to be released by the band since 2015's Anti-Nasty League, aside from a 2018 box-set compilation that included several unreleased remixes and a rough demo.

=== Delete Everything and PWEI.40: 2025–present ===
Adam Mole and Graham Crabb performing as PWEI.40 in 2026

In 2025, following the release of the single "Bruiser" in May, a new album, Delete Everything, was announced, with a release date in October. The announcement also revealed some slight changes to the lineup, with March and Townshend departing and Cliff Hewitt, the band's touring fill-in drummer, joining permanently. This new lineup embarked on an 18-date UK tour in support of the album.

In March 2026, PWEI announced the PWEI.40 project involving founder members Crabb and Mole.

== Vestan Pance ==
All PWEI songs during their original run are credited to Vestan Pance, a play on "Vest and Pants", a pseudonym for the band as a whole, although the songs were mainly Crabb's or Mansell's compositions. When Townshend joined the band, an attempt to change the name to Vestan Pance and Socks was denied by RCA.

== Band members ==
=== Current ===
Adam Mole (second from left) and Graham Crabb (centre) with Alex Griffin of Ned's Atomic Dustbin (second from right) and some fans in 2026

- Graham Crabb – vocals, drums, keyboards, programming, guitar (1986–1995, 2005, 2010–present)
- Adam Mole – guitars, keyboards, programming, piano (1986–1996, 2005, 2018–present)
- Mary Byker – vocals, keyboards, programming (2011–present)
- Davey Bennett – bass, guitars (2011–present)
- Cliff Hewitt – drums (2022–present)

=== Former ===
- Richard March – bass, guitars, keyboards, programming (1986–1996, 2005, 2017–2024)
- Clint Mansell – vocals, bass, guitars, keyboards, programming, samples, turntables, drums (1986–1996, 2005)
- John "Fuzz" Townshend – drums, keyboards, programming (1992–1996, 2005, 2016–2024)
- Kerry "The Buzzard" Hammond – guitars, backing vocals (1995–1996)
- Tim Muddiman – guitars, bass, keyboards (2011–2018)
- Jason Bowld – drums (2011–2016)

== Discography ==
=== Albums ===
Year	Album details	Peak chart positions		
Year	Album details	UK	AUS	US
1987	Box Frenzy	—	—	—
1989	This Is the Day...This Is the Hour...This Is This!	24	128	169
1990	Cure for Sanity	33	51	—
1992	The Looks or the Lifestyle?	15	165	—
1994	Dos Dedos Mis Amigos	11	132	—
2011	New Noise Designed by a Sadist	187	—	—
2013	A Lick of the Old Cassette Box (recorded 1996, previously unreleased)	—	—	—
2015	Anti-Nasty League	—	—	—
2025	Delete Everything	—	—	—

=== Live albums ===
- Weird's Bar and Grill (Live) (1993) UK No. 44
- The Radio 1 Sessions 1986-87 (1997)
- Reformation: Nottingham Rock City 20.01.05 (2005)
- Reformation: Birmingham Carling Academy 22.01.05 (2005)
- Reformation: Birmingham Carling Academy 23.01.05 (2005)
- Reformation: London Shepherds Bush Empire 24.01.05 (2005)
- Reformation: London Shepherds Bush Empire 25.01.05 (2005)
- On Patrol in the UK 2012 (2012)

=== Compilations ===
- Now for a Feast! (1988)
- 16 Different Flavours of Hell (Best of) (1993) UK No. 73
- Wise Up Suckers (BMG best of) (1996)
- PWEI Product 1986-1994 (Anthology) (2002)
- The Best Of (2008)
- Def Comms 86-18 (2018)

=== Remix albums ===
- Two Fingers My Friends! (1995) UK No. 25, AUS No. 118
- Reclaim the Game (Funk FIFA) (2014)
- PWEI.40 (2027)

=== EPs ===
- 2000 Light Ales from Home (1986) under the name 'Wild and Wandering'
- The Poppies Say GRRrrr! (1986)
- Poppiecock (1986)
- Very Metal Noise Pollution (1989) UK No. 45, AUS No. 121
- Amalgamation (1994)
- Watch the Bitch Blow (2014)

=== Singles ===
Year	Title	Chart positions			Album
Year	Title	UK	AUS	US Alt	Album
1987	"Sweet Sweet Pie"	100	—	—	Now for a Feast!
1987	"Love Missile F1-11"	78	—	—	Now for a Feast!
1987	"Beaver Patrol"	76	—	—	Box Frenzy
1988	"There Is No Love Between Us Anymore"	66	—	—	Box Frenzy
1988	"Def. Con. One"	63	—	30	This Is the Day...This Is the Hour...This Is This!
1989	"Can U Dig It?"	38	—	—	This Is the Day...This Is the Hour...This Is This!
1989	"Wise Up! Sucker"	41	—	—	This Is the Day...This Is the Hour...This Is This!
1990	"Touched by the Hand of Cicciolina"	28	172	—	Cure for Sanity
1990	"Dance of the Mad Bastards"	32	159	—	Cure for Sanity
1991	"X Y & Zee"	15	88	11	Cure for Sanity
1991	"92 Degrees"	23	187	—	Cure for Sanity
1991	"Another Man's Rhubarb"	—	—	—	Cure for Sanity
1992	"Karmadrome" / "Eat Me Drink Me Love Me"	17	121	—	The Looks or the Lifestyle?
1992	"Bulletproof!"	24	—	—	The Looks or the Lifestyle?
1993	"Get the Girl! Kill the Baddies!"	9	—	—	The Looks or the Lifestyle?
1993	"R.S.V.P." / "Familus Horribilus"	27	129	—	Dos Dedos Mis Amigos
1994	"Ich Bin Ein Auslander"	28	151	—	Dos Dedos Mis Amigos
1994	"Everything's Cool"	23	97	—	Dos Dedos Mis Amigos
2010	"Axe of Men 2010"	—	—	—	Non-album single
2011	"Chaos & Mayhem"	—	—	—	New Noise Designed by a Sadist
2012	"Disguise"	—	—	—	New Noise Designed by a Sadist
2014	"Watch the Bitch Blow"	—	—	—	Watch the Bitch Blow EP
2014	"Reclaim the Game (Funk FIFA)" featuring BNegão	—	—	—	Non-album single
2015	"Digital Meltdown"	—	—	—	Anti-Nasty League
2022	"The Poppies Strike Back"	—	—	—	Non-album singles
2022	"Chihuaua"	—	—	—	Non-album singles
2025	"Bruiser"	—	—	—	Delete Everything
2025	"Disco Misfits"	—	—	—	Delete Everything
2025	"Their Law (Ain't Our Law)"	—	—	—	Delete Everything
2025	"Built For Fun"	—	—	—	Delete Everything
2026	"1000× No! (PWEI.40 Rework)" featuring Stephen Mallinder	—	—	—	TBC
2026	"Ruff Justice (PWEI.40 Rework)" featuring Clams Baker	—	—	—	TBC

=== Video releases ===
- Unspoilt by Progress VHS (1991)
- Reformation: Birmingham Carling Academy 23.01.05 DVD (2005)

=== Music videos ===
- "Sweet Sweet Pie" (1987)
- "Love Missile F1-11" (1987)
- "Beaver Patrol" (1987)
- "There Is No Love Between Us Anymore" (1988)
- "Def.Con.One" (1989)
- "Can U Dig It?" (1989)
- "Wise Up! Sucker" (1989)
- "Touched by the Hand of Cicciolina" (1990)
- "X Y & Zee" (1990)
- "92°F" (1991)
- "Karmadrome" (1992)
- "Bulletproof!" (1992)
- "Get the Girl! Kill the Baddies!" (1993)
- "R.S.V.P." (1993)
- "Ich Bin Ein Auslander" (1994)
- "Everything's Cool" (1994)
- "Chaos & Mayhem" (2011)
- "Oldskool Cool" (2011)
- "Disguise" (2012)
- "Watch the Bitch Blow" (2014)
- "Babylon RIP" (2014)
- "Reclaim the Game (Funk FIFA)" (2014)
- "Hollow" (2014)
- "Chaos & Mayhem (Southern Belle Remix)" (2014)
- "21st Century English Civil War" (2015)
- "Angry Man's Deathbed" (2015)
- "Their Law (Ain't Our Law)" (2025)
- "Built for Fun" (2025)
- "1000× No! (PWEI.40 Rework)" (2026)
- "Ruff Justice (PWEI.40 Rework)" (2026)
- "Ich Bin Ein Auslander (PWEI.40 Rework)" (2026)
