= National Geographic UK =

British and Irish TV channel

- Broadcast area: United Kingdom; Iceland; Malta; Ireland

Programming
- Picture format: 2160p UHDTV (downscaled to 1080i and 16:9 576i for the HDTV and SDTV feeds, respectively)

Ownership
- Owner: National Geographic Society; National Geographic Europe Ltd
- Sister channels: BabyTV; Nat Geo Wild; Disney Jr.; Disney+ Cinema

History
- Launched: 1 September 1997; 29 years ago
- Replaced: Sky 2 (original)
- Former names: National Geographic Channel (1997-2016)

Links
- Website: nationalgeographic.co.uk nationalgeographic.ie

Availability

Streaming media
- Sky Go: Watch live (UK and Ireland only)
- Virgin TV: Watch live (UK only)
- TalkTalk TV: Watch live (UK only)
- BT TV: Watch live (UK only)

National Geographic UK is a British pay television channel that features documentaries. It is a localized version of the original namesake American channel. It features some programming similar to that on the Discovery Channel such as nature and science documentaries. The channel was launched in Europe in September 1997 and time shared initially with the failing NBC Europe until NBC Europe's demise in 1998, at which point it began timesharing with Fox Kids (as it had in the UK since launch, where it had replaced the failed first iteration of Sky 2); with analogue transmission of the channel ending, and the sale of Fox Kids to Disney, timesharing was eventually superseded by 24-hour broadcasting. It was later launched worldwide including in Asia and the United States. Today, the channel is available in over 143 countries, seen in more than 160 million homes and in 25 languages.

It is owned by a company called the "NGC-UK Partnership", which initially was jointly owned by the National Geographic Society and British Sky Broadcasting (BSkyB), but in 2006, Sky's parent company News Corporation (now The Walt Disney Company) purchased 25 percent of the stake in the partnership, followed by the acquisition of BSkyB's remaining 50 percent stake by its sister company, the Fox Entertainment Group.

This includes an English-language version for the United Kingdom, Ireland, Malta and Iceland. It also includes Dutch, Italian, Norwegian and Turkish speaking channels among others. The channel's musical signature is the Elmer Bernstein composed theme that has also appeared on the National Geographic broadcast-TV specials.

== Company ==
The channel is owned by the NGC-UK Partnership, which was formed in 1997 as a joint venture between National Geographic Television & Film, a division of the National Geographic Society and British Sky Broadcasting through its Sky Ventures division. The NGS provides programming expertise, while BSkyB provides its expertise on distribution, marketing, commercial and advertising sales. The partnership builds and operates National Geographic channels and services across Europe. It is headquartered in London. In December 2006, News Corporation purchased 25 percent of the Society's stake in the company. This meant that BSkyB owned half company, while the National Geographic Society and News Corp held 25 percent share each. In December 2007, BSkyB sold its stake in the partnership to the Fox Entertainment Group, through its Fox Networks Group subsidiary.

== HD feed ==
The channel launched its own high-definition feed on 22 May 2006 on Sky. The channel joined Virgin Media's cable TV line-up on 30 July 2009. On 5 August 2009, it was also made available on UPC Ireland's cable TV service. The HD version available in the UK and Ireland was not originally a simulcast of the standard definition version of the National Geographic Channel, with some of the content coming from Rush HD, however from 1 December 2010 National Geographic Channel HD became a simulcast feed.

== Programmes ==
- Air Crash Investigation
- Ape Man
- Banged Up Abroad
- Be the Creature
- Big Bang
- Britain's Greatest Machines with Chris Barrie
- Built for the Kill
- Car S.O.S.
- Cruise TV by LoveitBookit
- Dog Whisperer with Cesar Millan
- Doomsday Preppers
- Drain the Oceans
- End Day
- Escape Tech
- Explorations
- Explorer
- Family Guns
- Gordon Ramsay: Uncharted
- Gospel of Judas
- Highway Thru Hell
- Hollywood Science
- Hunter Hunted
- Interpol Investigates
- Is It Real?
- The Living Edens
- Living Wild
- Megacities
- Megafactories
- Megastructures
- Mysteries of the Deep
- Naked Science
- No Borders
- Planet Football
- Planet Mechanics
- Predators at War
- Rough Trades
- Scam City
- Science of the Bible
- Seconds from Disaster
- Situation Critical
- Storm Stories
- Strange Days on Planet Earth
- Strippers: Cars for Cash
- Taboo
- Thrill Zone
- Thunder Beasts
- Totally Wild
- Trading Faces
- What Would Happen If...?
- Wicked Tuna
- World of Wildlife

== Continuity / Voiceovers ==
Rob Jarvis, who is well known as Eddie in Hustle is one of the two main male promo voices for this channel, along with Adam Longworth from XFM radio station.

== See also ==
- National Geographic Channel
- National Geographic Channel Australia & New Zealand
- List of National Geographic Channel programs
- National Geographic Society
