= Graham Crabb =

- Also known as: Crabbi
- Born: Graham Charles Crabb; 10 October 1964 (age 62); Streetly, Warwickshire, England
- Genre: Rock
- Occupations: Songwriter, drummer, singer
- Instruments: Drums; vocals; electronics; programming; keyboards; guitar
- Years active: 1986–present
- Website: crabbi.net

Graham Charles Crabb (born 10 October 1964), also known as Crabbi, is an English musician, best known for performing in the industrial/dance rock band Pop Will Eat Itself (PWEI).

== Biography ==
Crabb was a founder member of Pop Will Eat Itself. He and Clint Mansell were the main songwriters. Crabb was also the drummer until the release of Box Frenzy in 1987, after which he became vocalist and co-frontman with Mansell. He worked with PWEI until 1995, and then formed Golden Claw Musics.

=== Golden Claw Musics ===
Golden Claw Musics was the main musical project of Crabb after he left Pop Will Eat Itself in 1995. In 1993, he remixed Pop Will Eat Itself's "Get the Girl! Kill the Baddies!" as a B-side called "Part Man Part Machine", prompting him to release more of his ambient material. A remix of Pop Will Eat Itself's song "Cape Connection" was released on the limited 2CD edition of the album Two Fingers, My Friends!. Crabb released the album All Blue Review, as well as an accompanying single for "Digging the Dancing Weed", with Eno engineer Marcus Dravs on Infectious Records in July 1994. Despite Crabb leaving PWEI to focus on Golden Claw Musics, they have not released any more material to date.

=== Other projects ===
After the Golden Claw Musics project, Crabb disappeared from the music industry, although he made appearances on former PWEI members' albums. In 2005, PWEI played a few reformation shows in the UK, which led to the formation of Vileevils with Fuzz Townshend and Adam Mole. Vile Evils disbanded in February 2010 after releasing four singles on US label dPulse.

In 2007, Crabb co-composed the track "They Follow You" on Siouxsie's solo album Mantaray.

Crabb remixed KMFDM, Revolting Cocks (2009), and US Grammy winner Kevin Max (2010).

Crabb put together a new version of Pop Will Eat Itself to celebrate the band's 25th year in 2011. In July 2011, a new line-up of PWEI was announced, featuring Crabb as the only original member. In October 2011, the album New Noise Designed by a Sadist was released on Cooking Vinyl, to be followed by a UK tour.

In June 2013 it was announced Crabb had joined the industrial collective Primitive Race. The group have since released an EP and an album, both with prominent input from Crabb.

In late 2014, Crabb began work on a new solo project known as Je Suis Crabbi. The first release under the name was the EP crabbi.net/ep1 in May 2015, available exclusively through the official Pop Will Eat Itself store.

== Discography ==
=== As Golden Claw Musics: ===
==== Album ====
- All Blue Revue (1994)

==== Single ====
- "Digging the Dancing Weed" (1994)

=== As Je Suis Crabbi: ===
==== EP ====
- crabbi.net/ep1 (2015)
