= Requiem for a Dream (disambiguation) =

Requiem for a Dream is a 2000 American drama film directed by Darren Aronofsky.

Requiem for a Dream may also refer to:

- Requiem for a Dream (novel), written by Hubert Selby, Jr. and on which the film is based
- Requiem for a Dream (soundtrack), released with the film
  - "Lux Aeterna" (Mansell), the title theme from the film
