= Requiem for a Dream (soundtrack) =

Soundtrack album by Clint Mansell
- Released: 2000
- Genres: Electronic, neoclassical, ambient, IDM
- Length: 51:19
- Label: Nonesuch Records

Singles from Requiem for a Dream
- 1. "Lux Aeterna" Released: 2000

Requiem for a Dream is the soundtrack album from the 2000 film Requiem for a Dream. It was composed by Clint Mansell and performed by the Kronos Quartet. The music for the film is noted for its minimalist qualities in which it uses constant harmonies, a steady pulse, and often variation of musical phrases to drive a point. The album is best known for the track "Lux Aeterna".

== Background ==
With the success of the film also came a successful soundtrack. Composer of the soundtrack Clint Mansell has worked very closely with Darren Aronofsky throughout his movie career. Mansell also has worked on Aronofsky's first film π. Both π and Requiem for a Dream are noted for their off notes and range of tenebrous emotions. In the opening credits before the title of the movie appears, the quartet can be heard tuning their instruments, before a conductor is heard tapping on the music stand to ready the quartet for a performance. Aronofsky and Mansell both grew up listening to Hip hop which they based a lot of their decision making on that type of music. Mansell took a classic hiphop record and reworked it with the score. Aronofsky saw Requiem as a "monster movie, only when something goes bad you hear the music."

The soundtrack has been widely praised, and in particular the track "Lux Aeterna" (which itself is much used in the film) has subsequently been used in various forms of media. The theme was reorchestrated for The Lord of the Rings: The Two Towers trailer and is known by the name "Requiem for a Tower", presented by Corner Stone Cues. The theme has been featured in trailers for other films, including Babylon A.D., The Da Vinci Code, I Am Legend, Sunshine, and Valley of Flowers. It also appeared in the video games Total Miner: Forge (Xbox Live Indie Game 2011), Assassin's Creed, and in numerous TV spots and advertisements, and at sporting events. Use of the theme has extended to the point where it is interchangeable with the name "Requiem for a Dream".

A remix album, Requiem for a Dream: Remixed, contained new mixes of the music by Paul Oakenfold, Josh Wink, Jagz Kooner, and Delerium, among others.

== The Kronos Quartet ==
The Kronos Quartet is the string quartet that performed the soundtrack for Requiem for a Dream. The quartet was founded in 1973 by David Harrington in Seattle. The members were David Harrington and John Sherba, violins; Hank Dutt, viola; and Joan Jeanrenaud, cello. The group was chosen for its minimalist approach.

== Critical reception ==
Professional ratings
Review scores
Source	Rating
Allmusic	4/5 stars

Reviews have generally been very favorable. Allmusic gave the album four stars, saying that the score "manages to be appropriately dark and disturbing, as well as compulsively listenable"; Salon praised the "terrific musical score"; and The Observer of the University of Notre Dame and Saint Mary's College called the score "heart-stopping". Filmcritic.com, in a negative review of the score, spoke of "the driving, thumping, angry, brutal violin score which drums like a hammer and chain beating you into submission."

== Inspirations ==
The novel Requiem for a Dream was written by Hubert Selby Jr. who was inspired to write it when he lived in LA. He wanted to write about something in the real world rather than something from the fantasy genre. One of the main influences of his work was his life experiences. Hubert's life was very unfortunate; at the age of 18, he was a merchant seaman during World War II. During that time he was hospitalized for three years for treatment of tuberculosis and other illnesses or injuries he acquired.

Six months before Hubert wrote Requiem for a Dream, he was sick with pneumonia, going in and out of comas. His wife was worried about his health but he refused to go to a hospital. One night, his wife woke up from a dream about two spirits that had opened the door in their room; she says that she could tell that they were male and female. The two spirits told her that if Hubert did not get medical attention, he might die. She eventually called a friend, who happened to be a respiratory therapist. She told him about all the things that have been happening with Hubert and he scolded him about his health and told her to take him to the hospital.

== Composer ==
Clint Mansell, the composer of this soundtrack, is an English musician, composer, and former lead singer and guitarist of the band Pop Will Eat Itself (1996). Aronofsky, the director of the film, hired him to score his film Pi. He scored Requiem for a Dream in 2000, and all of Aronofsky's films since.

== Track listings ==
=== Original album ===
==== Summer ====
1. "Summer Overture" – 2:37
2. "Party" – 0:29
3. "Coney Island Dreaming" – 1:04
4. "Party" – 0:36
5. "Chocolate Charms" – 0:25
6. "Ghosts of Things to Come" – 1:34
7. "Dreams" – 0:44
8. "Tense" – 0:38
9. "Dr. Pill" – 0:42
10. "High on Life" – 0:11
11. "Ghosts" – 1:21
12. "Crimin' & Dealin'" – 1:44
13. "Hope Overture" – 2:31
14. "Tense" – 0:28
15. "Bialy & Lox Conga" – 0:45

==== Fall ====
16. "Cleaning Apartment" – 1:28
17. "Ghosts-Falling" – 1:11
18. "Dreams" – 1:02
19. "Arnold" – 2:35
20. "Marion Barfs" – 2:22
21. "Supermarket Sweep" – 2:14
22. "Dreams" – 0:32
23. "Sara Goldfarb Has Left the Building" – 1:17
24. "Bugs Got a Devilish Grin Conga" – 0:57

==== Winter ====
25. "Winter Overture" – 0:19
26. "Southern Hospitality" – 1:23
27. "Fear" – 2:26
28. "Full Tense" – 1:04
29. "The Beginning of the End" – 4:28
30. "Ghosts of a Future Lost" – 1:51
31. "Meltdown" – 3:57
32. "Lux Aeterna" – 3:54
33. "Coney Island Low" – 2:13

Clint Mansell – "Requiem For A Tower Mvt. IV"
listen to a clip from "Requiem For A Tower Mvt. IV".

=== Requiem for a Tower EP ===
1. "Requiem for a Tower, Movement 2"
2. "Requiem for a Tower, Movement 3"
3. "Requiem for a Tower, Movement 4"

=== Requiem for a Dream: Remixed album ===
1. Clint Mansell – "Tappy's Intro (Film Score)" – 0:51
2. Plant – "In the End It's All Nice" – 6:17
3. Psilonaut – "Ghosts in the Machine" – 6:56
4. Paul Oakenfold – "Æternal" – 6:50
5. Clint Mansell – "Seacoast Towers (Film Score)" – 0:54
6. Jagz Kooner – "Coney Island Express" – 7:09
7. Clint Mansell – "Seacoast Alarm (Film Score)" – 0:30
8. Wish FM – "Haunted Dreams" – 6:36
9. Kronos Quartet – "Tense" – 0:14
10. Josh Wink – "Full Tension" – 8:25
11. Clint Mansell – "Food (Film Score)" – 1:21
12. Delerium – "Deluxed" – 7:20
13. Clint Mansell – "Island (Film Score)" – 0:16
14. A Guy Called Gerald – "Body and Fear – 5:48
15. Clint Mansell – "112 (Film Score)" – 1:13
16. Ils – "Overturned" – 5:41
17. Clint Mansell – "Sara (Film Score)" – 1:08
18. Hive – "Hand Jive" – 3:27
19. Clint Mansell – "Arnold (Film Score)" – 0:44
20. Clint Mansell – "Ghosts (Vocal Version)" – 4:22

== Certifications and sales ==
Region	Certification	Certified units/sales
Greece (IFPI Greece)	Gold	15,000^{^}
United States	—	158,000
^{^} Shipments figures based on certification alone.
