= Where Dead Voices Gather =

Book by Nick Tosches

- Author: Nick Tosches
- Language: English
- Genre: Biography, Music, Journalism
- Publisher: Little, Brown (USA)
- Publication date: August 21, 2001 (USA)
- Publication place: United States
- Media type: Print (Hardback, Paperback)
- Pages: 352 pp (hardback first edition)
- ISBN: 0-316-89507-5
- Dewey Decimal: 782.42164/092 B 21
- LC Class: ML420.M509 T68 2001

Where Dead Voices Gather is a book by Nick Tosches. It is, in part, a biography of Emmett Miller, one of the last minstrel singers. Just as importantly, it depicts Tosches' search for information about Miller, about whom he initially wrote in his book Country: The Twisted Roots of Rock and Roll. It is also a study of minstrelsy and its connection to American folk music, country music, the blues and ultimately, rock and roll. In that way, it is a companion volume to his other books of music journalism, Country and Unsung Heroes of Rock N' Roll.

== Critical reception ==
Nick Kent of The Guardian described the book as "less of a journey and more of a long, intermittently entertaining and revealing ramble.
