= The Minstrel Man from Georgia =

Compilation album by Emmett Miller
- Released: 1996
- Recorded: 1928, 1929
- Genre: Minstrel music
- Label: Legacy/Columbia
- Producer: George Morrow, Lawrence Cohn

The Minstrel Man from Georgia is a compilation album by the American musician Emmett Miller, released in 1996. It was part of Legacy Recordings' Roots n' Blues collection. The compilation was reissued in 2001 to coincide with Nick Tosches's Miller biography. Tosches, who first wrote about Miller in his 1977 book, Country: The Biggest Music in America, expanded his research for the 2001 book, Where Dead Voices Gather.

== Production ==
Interest in Miller grew over the years due to Tosches's writings as well as the Merle Haggard album I Love Dixie Blues; Haggard had first heard Miller while visiting an ill Bob Wills. The songs on the compilation were recorded in New York City in 1928 and 1929 and originally released by OKeh Records. Miller was backed by the Georgia Crackers, a group that included Jimmy and Tommy Dorsey. Gene Krupa, Jack Teagarden, and Eddie Lang appeared on some of the tracks. The liner notes are by musicologist Charles Wolfe. The compilation added six tracks not found on a previous collection, 1969's Emmet Miller Acc. by His Georgia Crackers [sic]. While an influence on Jimmie Rodgers and Hank Williams, Miller considered his music and minstrel act to be a job, not a representation of his creativity or artistic imagination. The compilation includes two skits as well as comedy bits that precede some of the songs. Miller's recording of "Lovesick Blues" was an inspiration for Williams's version. "St. Louis Blues" is a version of the W. C. Handy song; it was for years a standard of blackface entertainers. "Anytime" is a version of the song written by Herbert Lawson and later covered by Eddy Arnold.

== Critical reception ==
Professional ratings
Review scores
Source	Rating
AllMusic	4/5 stars
MusicHound Folk: The Essential Album Guide	4/5 stars

Peter Margasak, in the Chicago Reader, called Miller "the best and most important white blues singer ever... While superficially mimicking the vocal mannerisms of rural blacks, Miller in essence tapped into a wellspring of emotionalism that eclipsed the folk forms of the south and offered an alternative to the slick urbanity of early jazz singers." Stereo Review labeled the album "the year's most illuminating reissue," and noted that "Miller emerges from these still-vital recordings as the father of modern country music, a case could also be made for him as one of the most supple and rhythmically assured male jazz vocalists of the Twenties." Chuck Eddy considered Miller "the missing link between Mark Twain and the Beastie Boys," writing, "I've never before heard a singer this high and long and nasal; Jimmie Rodgers and Hank Williams ripped off Emmett's vocal mannerisms outright, but they sound strained compared to him."

The Boston Globe opined that "there is just something infectious about that voice... Maybe it's the clear, clean phrasing with its odd falsetto breaks that, though they may be loosely described as yodels, are more personal quirk than Alpine import." The New York Daily News concluded that Miller "was one of those critical 'bridge artists' who took old traditions and reworked them to bring the music up to the next generation." The Toronto Star noted that a listener heard "not only the lonesome pre-echoes of Rodgers, Wills, Williams and Gene Autry, but perhaps even the primordial collision of minstrelsy, country and blues that would eventually mutate into rock 'n' roll." The Journal of American Folklore called Miller "one of the most original yodelers in American music."

Spin determined that Miller's "bleat [is] as powerful as early electric guitar"; the magazine included the compilation on its list of "The 10 Best Albums You Didn't Hear in '96". Chris Morris, in Billboard, listed The Minstrel Man from Georgia as the 10th best album of 1996. AllMusic deemed the compilation "more of historical interest and musical significance than anything else." MusicHound Folk: The Essential Album Guide considered it "a masterpiece in musical archaeology."

== Track listing ==
No.	Title	Length
1.	"God's River"
2.	"I Ain't Got Nobody"
3.	"Lovesick Blues"
4.	"The Lion Tamers"
5.	"Anytime"
6.	"St. Louis Blues"
7.	"Take Your Tomorrow"
8.	"Dusky Stevedore"
9.	"I Ain't Gonna Give Nobody None o' This Jelly Roll"
10.	"(I Got a Woman Crazy for Me) She's Funny That Way"
11.	"You Lose"
12.	"Right or Wrong"
13.	"That's the Good Old Sunny South"
14.	"You're the Cream in My Coffee"
15.	"Lovin' Sam (The Sheik of Alabam')"
16.	"Big Bad Bill Is Sweet William Now"
17.	"The Ghost of the St. Louis Blues"
18.	"Sweet Mama (Papa's Getting Mad)"
19.	"The Pickaninnies' Paradise"
20.	"The Blues Singer (From Alabam')"
