= In the Hand of Dante =

In the Hand of Dante may refer to:

- In the Hand of Dante (novel), a 2002 novel by Nick Tosches
- In the Hand of Dante (film), a 2025 drama film, based on the novel
