= Corner Stone Cues =

US record label and music production house

Corner Stone Cues (CSC) is a label and music production house based in Los Angeles. It is best known for the debut release and the title song "Requiem for a Tower" featured in The Lord of the Rings: The Two Towers trailer. "Requiem for a Tower" is the re-orchestration and arrangement by Daniel J. Nielsen, Simone Benyacar, and Veigar Margeirsson of Clint Mansell’s "Lux Aeterna", written for the film Requiem for a Dream.

In 2006 CSC collaborated with electro rock band Kinky from Monterrey, Nuevo Leon, Mexico. The 5 song E.P. titled "Sassy" included Kinky's cover of Wall of Voodoo's "Mexican Radio". Kinky later included a remastered version of Mexican Radio on the re-release of Reina. Both Reina and Sassy were originally distributed by Nettwerk.

In 2008 "Eton Path" was released, including the London Studio Orchestra, Purcell Singers, Azam Ali, Dierdre Dubois, Riffat Salamatt, Bryan "Brain" Mantia, Buckethead, and Damian Marley. Eton Path includes adaptations of the Led Zeppelin songs "Ten Years Gone" and "Kashmir". CSC re-orchestrated two movements titled "Ten Years Kashmir Mvt I& II".

"In Situ" the most recent release, features songs mainly composed by Daniel Law Heath.

There are tentative plans to record a future hybrid orchestral/Epic Music album in the "Eton Path" style.

== Company ==
Corner Stone Cues was founded in 2006 and is owned by Nathan D. Duvall. The company is based in Los Angeles, California

== Discography ==
=== Requiem for a Tower ===
Requiem for a Tower was released in September 2006. Since them, the "Requiem for a Tower" track was licensed by British broadcasting company Sky Sports as the theme for "Soccer Saturday". Other licensings included Wimbledon, 2006 and 2008 Olympics, 2007 Super Bowl, 2007 Rose Bowl, 2007 NASCAR Championship, and the 2008 and 2009 NBA Finals.

Requiem for a Tower

Studio album by Corner Stone Cues
- Released: September 2006
- Genre: Epic music, Modern classical, orchestral hybrid, symphonic rock
- Length: 0:24:46
- Label: Corner Stone Cues
- Producer: Nathan D. Duvall

Corner Stone Cues chronology
Requiem for a Tower (2006)	Sassy (2006)

1. Requiem for a Tower Mvt II
2. Requiem for a Tower Mvt III
3. Requiem for a Tower Mvt IV
4. Wicked
5. J.B.D.
6. Betrayal & Redemption
7. Threshold
8. Shining Path (L.U.2.P)
9. Leather Tomb
10. Ghost in the Trees
11. Azure
12. Forrest Chase

=== Sassy ===
Sassy, released in September 2006, features music from Kinky. "Mexican Radio" was licensed for the Need for Speed: Undercover in-game soundtrack.

Sassy

EP by Kinky
- Released: September 2006
- Genre: Electro, dance, rock
- Length: 0:13:48
- Label: Corner Stone Cues
- Producer: Nathan D. Duvall & Kinky

Kinky chronology
Requiem for a Tower (2006)	Sassy (2006)	Eton Path (2008)

1. Freezing Film
2. Mexican Radio
3. Angry
4. Automatic (edit)
5. El Patan Natan

=== Eton Path ===
Eton Path was released in February 2008 and was recorded at George Martin's AIR Studios in London, with engineering team Nick Wollage and Olga Fitzroy. "Ten Years Kashmir Mvt II" was placed for use in the following:

- the John Carter trailer
- Top Gear
- So You Think You Can Dance (UK)
- the Anime Mirai 2013 trailer, and
- the X-Men: Days of Future Past trailer

"Gloriana" was licensed for the final battle scene in Night at the Museum: Battle of the Smithsonian.

Eton Path

Studio album by Corner Stone Cues
- Released: February 2008
- Genre: Epic music, Modern classical, orchestral hybrid, symphonic rock
- Length: 1:14:23
- Label: Corner Stone Cues
- Producer: Nathan D. Duvall

Corner Stone Cues chronology
Sassy (2006)	Eton Path (2008)	In Situ (2012)

1. Sultana
2. Madokara Mieru
3. Eton Path
4. Mojave
5. Black Widow
6. Demons
7. World's End
8. Night Terrors
9. Saw Blade
10. Frigga
11. Seraphim
12. Laudate
13. Gloriana
14. Underture
15. Ten Years Kashmir Mvt I
16. Ten Years Kashmir Mvt II

=== In Situ ===
"In Situ" was released on April 17, 2012. "Take Down" was licensed as the back-end cue for the Spartacus: War of the Damned teaser trailer (which debuted at Comic Con 2012).

In Situ

Studio album by Corner Stone Cues
- Released: April 2012
- Genre: Epic music, Modern classical, orchestral hybrid, symphonic rock
- Length: 0:24:46
- Label: Corner Stone Cues
- Producer: Nathan D. Duvall

Corner Stone Cues chronology
Eton Path (2008)	In Situ (2012)

1. Song of Sorrow
2. Dreaming
3. In Situ
4. Take Down
5. Shot
6. Thumper
7. Panda
8. Unsettled
9. Old Dominion
10. Coffin
11. What If
12. Lex
13. Aston Martin
14. Rude Boy
15. Flame
16. In Situ (Instrumental)
17. Lex (Instrumental)

== See also ==
- Trailer music
