= In the Hand of Dante (film) =

2025 film by Julian Schnabel

- American promotional release poster
- Directed by: Julian Schnabel
- Written by: Julian Schnabel; Louise Kugelberg
- Based on: In the Hand of Dante by Nick Tosches
- Produced by: Jon Kilik; Francesco Melzi d'Eril; Olmo Schnabel; Gabriele Bebe Moratti; Vito Schnabel; Julian Schnabel
- Starring: Oscar Isaac; Gal Gadot; Gerard Butler; John Malkovich; Louis Cancelmi; Sabrina Impacciatore; Benjamin Clementine; Martin Scorsese; Al Pacino; Jason Momoa
- Cinematography: Roman Vasyanov
- Edited by: Marco Spoletini; Louise Kugelberg
- Music by: Benjamin Clementine
- Production companies: DreamCrew Entertainment; MeMo Films; Twin Pictures; ArtOfficial Productions
- Distributed by: Netflix
- Release dates: September 3, 2025 (Venice); June 12, 2026 (United States); June 24, 2026 (Netflix)
- Running time: 153 minutes
- Countries: Italy; United States
- Languages: English; Italian
- Budget: $25 million

In the Hand of Dante is a 2025 drama film directed by Julian Schnabel, who co-wrote the screenplay with Louise Kugelberg, based on the 2002 novel by Nick Tosches. It follows a handwritten manuscript of Dante Alighieri's Divine Comedy found in a hidden Vatican cellar, which makes its way to a mob boss in New York City, ending up in the hands of Nick Tosches. It stars Oscar Isaac alongside an ensemble cast that includes Gal Gadot, Gerard Butler, John Malkovich, Louis Cancelmi, Sabrina Impacciatore, Benjamin Clementine, Martin Scorsese, Al Pacino, and Jason Momoa.

The film had its world premiere out of competition in the 82nd Venice International Film Festival on September 3, 2025. It was theatrically released in the United States on June 12, 2026, followed by a streaming release on Netflix on June 24.

== Plot ==
Deadline magazine summarizes the premise of the film stating: "(Oscar) Isaac plays Dante in sequences shot in color in Italy that explore his efforts in writing the classic and looking for mystical knowledge. He also plays author Nick Tosches, whose 2002 book In the Hand of Dante makes him out to be a renowned Dante expert employed by a mafia don to confirm its existence and then steal it for him. Those sequences, quite violent in parts, are shot in black-and-white to show contrast between the more artistic world of the early 1300s vs. today's brutal and greedy landscape where art is just a commodity for some. He's accompanied by ace assassin, Louie (Gerard Butler), and another goon, Lefty (Louis Cancelmi). The don, Joe Black (John Malkovich), sends them off to the Vatican, where supposedly the original manuscript actually could be verified and brought back to him."

== Cast ==
- Oscar Isaac as Nick Tosches / Dante Alighieri
- Gal Gadot as Giulietta / Gemma Donati
- Gerard Butler as Louie / Pope Boniface VIII
- John Malkovich as Joe Black
- Martin Scorsese as Isaiah, Alighieri's mentor
- Al Pacino as Uncle Carmine
- Jason Momoa as Rosario
- Louis Cancelmi as Lefty / Guido da Polenta
- Sabrina Impacciatore as Dr. Susanna Pulice
- Franco Nero as Don Lecco
- Benjamin Clementine as Mephistopheles
- Paolo Bonacelli as the Adult Priest of Alcamo
- Lorenzo Zurzolo as Don Lecco (33)
- Claudio Santamaria as Archivist (Fabriano)
- Guido Caprino as Guido Cavalcanti
- Mohamed Zouaoui as Tunisian Bartender

== Production ==
In December 2008, it was announced Johnny Depp's production company Infinitum Nihil had acquired rights to In the Hand of Dante by Nick Tosches, with Depp eying to star and produce. In July 2011, it was announced Julian Schnabel would direct the film. In September 2023, Oscar Isaac joined the cast of the film, replacing Depp.

In October 2023, it was announced that Jason Momoa, Gerard Butler, and Gal Gadot had joined the cast of the film, with Martin Scorsese set to executive produce. In November 2023, Al Pacino, John Malkovich, Benjamin Clementine, Louis Cancelmi, Sabrina Impacciatore, Franco Nero, Claudio Santamaria, Guido Caprino, Paolo Bonacelli and Dora Romano were announced to star in the film. In February 2024, it was reported that Scorsese would also play a role in the film.

Principal photography began in October 2023 in Italy, with the project securing a SAG-AFTRA interim agreement.

== Release ==
The film had its world premiere out of competition in the 82nd Venice International Film Festival on September 3, 2025. One month before its Venice premiere, it leaked online. In March 2026, Netflix acquired distribution rights to the film. The film was released in the United States on June 12, 2026, before streaming on Netflix from June 24.

== Reception ==
On the review aggregator website Rotten Tomatoes, 30% of 54 critics' reviews are positive, with an average rating of 4.3/10. The website's consensus reads: "In the Hand of Dante is a bloated, wildly overplayed literary fever dream whose attempts to merge past and present collapse into accidental farce."

Pete Hammond for Deadline writes the film has an "unpredictable, if uneven, screenplay that is all over the map" and that the movie "bites off possibly more than it can chew", but lauds Schnabel for taking a "big swing."

Peter Bradshaw for The Guardian gave the film 3/5 stars, singling out Gerard Butler for praise, and said the first 2/3 of the film was enjoyable but "in the end it flags."

Matthew Joseph Jenner, writing in Venice 2025, describes the film as a bland failure that is “bloated” and “insincere" and "not even interesting enough for us to appreciate its audacity.”
