= Leo Gradwell =

British sailor, barrister and magistrate (1899–1969)

- Born: Joseph Leo Anthony Gradwell; 28 July 1899; New Brighton, Cheshire, England
- Died: 8 November 1969 (aged 70); Torbay, Devon
- Military career
- Allegiance: United Kingdom
- Branch: Royal Navy
- Rank: Lieutenant
- Commands: HMS Ayrshire (FY 225); HMS Thirlmere (FY 206)
- Conflicts: First World War; Second World War
- Awards: Distinguished Service Cross

Joseph Leo Anthony Gradwell DSC (28 July 1899 – 8 November 1969) was a British barrister, a magistrate and a Second World War Royal Navy volunteer, who in July 1942 against orders, led his own RN-adapted trawler HMS Ayrshire and three merchant ships from the disaster of Convoy PQ 17 into Arkhangelsk, Soviet Union.

== Early life ==
Gradwell was born in New Brighton, Cheshire, England, the son of solicitor Joseph Gradwell and Gertrude Mary Theresa Taylor. He was educated at Stonyhurst College, Lancashire and then read classics at Balliol College, Oxford. By the time he graduated he spoke six languages. He joined the Royal Navy as a midshipman, serving in the First World War.

== Barrister ==
At the cessation of hostilities, Gradwell was discharged from the Navy and started a pupillage in Liverpool and was called to the bar in 1925. He entered chambers in Liverpool, then practised as an advocate on the Northern Circuit. During his spare time, he enjoyed sailing in the Irish Sea and gained a coastal navigation certificate.

== Second World War ==
At the outbreak of the Second World War, Gradwell was commissioned into the Royal Naval Volunteer Reserve as a lieutenant. He returned to active service in 1942 and was given command of the anti-submarine warfare adapted 575 long tons (584 t) Middlesbrough-built trawler MS Ayrshire, renamed HMS Ayrshire (FY 225), with a crew of volunteer fishermen.

Attached as part of the defensive net around Convoy PQ 17, on receiving the third order to scatter on 4 July 1942, Gradwell concluded that as he was heading north to the Arctic ice shelf, he might as well take some merchant ships with him. Leading his convoy of Ayrshire and three merchant vessels – the Panamanian-registered Troubador, the Ironclad, and the American-registered Silver Sword – he proceeded north using only a sextant and the Times World Geographic Pocket Book, as his vessel lacked charts for this part of the Atlantic. On reaching the Arctic ice pack, the convoy found itself stuck fast, so the ships stopped engines and banked their fires. Gradwell arranged a defence formulated around the fact that the Troubador was carrying a cargo of bunkering coal and drums of white paint: the crews painted all the vessels white, covered decks with white linen, and arranged the Sherman tanks on the merchant vessels' decks into a defensive ring, with loaded main armament.

After a period of waiting, and having evaded the reconnoitering Luftwaffe aircraft, finding themselves unstuck they proceeded to the Matochkin Strait in Novaya Zemlya. They were found there by a flotilla of corvettes that escorted the four-ship convoy, plus two other merchant vessels, to the Russian port of Archangel, arriving on 25 July. Awarded the Distinguished Service Cross on 15 September 1942, he later went on to command the ASW-adapted whaler HMS Thirlmere (FY 206).

== London magistrate ==
After the end of hostilities, Gradwell returned to his career in court. He was made a stipendiary magistrate on the London circuit at Marlborough Street Magistrates' Court in 1951, where he shared an office in a tempestuous relationship with Edward Robey, the son of comedian George Robey. A few months later, he contracted polio; after successful treatment, he returned to his position as magistrate. Dealing mainly with licensing cases, during his career Gradwell processed the case of Stephen Ward during the Profumo affair, committing Ward for trial at the Old Bailey in July 1963.

After the British publishing rights to Hubert Selby, Jr.'s novel Last Exit to Brooklyn were acquired by Marion Boyars and John Calder in January 1966, Gradwell was the judge for the private prosecution brought by Sir Cyril Black, the then Conservative Member of Parliament for Wimbledon. The public prosecutor brought an action under Section 3 of the Obscene Publications Act, which Gradwell agreed with, and Gradwell ordered that all copies of the book be destroyed, though that applied only to seized copies within the Magistrate's Court. Expert witnesses spoke, "unprecedentedly," for the prosecution, including the publishers Sir Basil Blackwell and Robert Maxwell. The order was overturned by a successful appeal issued by the lawyer and writer John Mortimer: Mr Justice Lane reversed the ruling in 1968.

== Death ==
Retiring in 1967, Gradwell died at home in 1969, aged 70.
