= King of the Jews =

King of the Jews or King of the Judeans may refer to:

== History ==
Ruler of historic kingdoms and client states:

- Kings of Israel and Judah
  - Kings of Judah (c.931 – 586 BCE)

Others:

- Mocking epithet applied to Peter of Castile (1334–1369) by Henry of Trastamara
- In the antisemitic forgery The Protocols of the Elders of Zion, the future figurehead envisaged by the Elders.

== Religion ==
- A title of the Jewish Messiah
  - Jesus, King of the Jews
  - See also Davidic line and Jewish Messiah claimants

== Literature ==
- King of the Jews, play by Grand Duke Konstantin Konstantinovich of Russia
- King of the Jews, book by Waverley Root
- King of the Jews, 1979 novel by Leslie Epstein
- King of the Jews (Nick Tosches book), 2005 book by Nick Tosches

== Music ==
- "The King of the Jews", incidental music by Alexander Glazunov for the play by the Grand Duke Konstantin Konstantinovich of Russia
- "King of the Jews", a track on the 1973 Christian Rock album What a Day by Phil Keaggy
- "Tiny, King of the Jews", a track on the 1987 noise rock album Songs About Fucking by Big Black.
- King of the Jews (album), a 1991 album by the band Oxbow
- "King of the Jews", a track on the 1992 doom metal album Fall Babylon Fall by Veni Domine.

== See also ==
- King of Judea (disambiguation)
