= The Willow Tree (novel) =

1998 novel by Hubert Selby Jr

- First edition
- Author: Hubert Selby Jr
- Language: English
- Genre: Modern tragedy
- Publisher: Marion Boyars Publishers
- Publication date: 1998
- Publication place: United States
- Media type: Print
- ISBN: 978-0-7145-3139-7
- Preceded by: Requiem for a Dream

The Willow Tree is a novel written by Hubert Selby, Jr. and was published in 1998. It was Selby's first novel in twenty years, since 1978's Requiem for a Dream.

== Plot summary ==
The protagonist is a thirteen-year-old African-American boy named Bobby who lives in an apartment in South Bronx with his mother and siblings. Despite his young age Bobby has intelligence that is superior to most of the people around him. Bobby and his Hispanic girlfriend Maria often spend time together and have plans for the upcoming summer. Bobby's and Maria's lives are shattered when a vicious Puerto Rican street gang attack them while the two are walking to school. Bobby and Maria are severely beaten and Maria is sent to the hospital suffering from near-fatal wounds. After Bobby is beaten he gets picked up by Moishe, a lonely, old Holocaust survivor, and an unlikely friendship between Bobby and Moishe develops. Maria, unable to cope with the mutilation of her face caused by the lye, commits suicide by jumping out of her hospital room window. Moishe and Bobby grow close by sharing their grief with one another: Moishe's painful memories of being in a World War II concentration camp, and Bobby's beating of his and Maria's by thugs. Bobby states that deep in his mind he still has a desperate need for revenge. Moishe warns Bobby: "...in the end hate will kill you." Bobby remains determined, however, exercising with weights during the day and walking the streets at night searching for the gang. One by one, Bobby confronts each gang member and brutally beats and maims them, vowing to kill the gang's leader. As Bobby is about to push the gang leader off a rooftop, he ultimately relents. Moishe, who has essentially adopted Bobby, has shown him compassion and beauty in the world outside of his tenement surroundings. With trips to the park (and sitting under the titular "Willow Tree"), birthday and Christmas celebrations and a Thanksgiving dinner, Moishe explains to Bobby why he did not kill the gang leader: "Youre thinking youre supposed to, but not really wanting to."

== Release details ==
- Paperback - ISBN 978-0-7145-3139-7, published in 1998 by Marion Boyars Publishers
