= Last Exit to Brooklyn (film) =

1989 film by Uli Edel

- Theatrical release poster
- Directed by: Uli Edel
- Screenplay by: Desmond Nakano
- Based on: Last Exit to Brooklyn by Hubert Selby Jr.
- Produced by: Bernd Eichinger
- Starring: Stephen Lang; Jennifer Jason Leigh; Burt Young; Peter Dobson; Jerry Orbach
- Cinematography: Stefan Czapsky
- Edited by: Peter Przygodda
- Music by: Mark Knopfler
- Production companies: Allied Filmmakers; Bavaria Film; Neue Constantin Film
- Distributed by: Neue Constantin Film (Germany); Guild Film Distribution (United Kingdom); Cinecom Pictures (United States)
- Release dates: 12 October 1989 (West Germany); 5 January 1990 (United Kingdom); 2 May 1990 (United States)
- Running time: 103 minutes
- Countries: West Germany; United Kingdom; United States
- Language: English
- Budget: $17 million
- Box office: $1,730,005

Last Exit to Brooklyn is a 1989 drama film directed by Uli Edel and adapted by Desmond Nakano from Hubert Selby Jr.'s 1964 novel of the same title. The film is an international co-production between Germany the UK and the United States. The story is set in 1950s Brooklyn and takes place against the backdrop of a labor strike. It follows interlocking storylines among the working class underbelly of the Red Hook neighborhood, including unionized workers, sex workers and drag queens.

== Plot ==
In 1952 Brooklyn, workers have entered the sixth month of a strike against the local factory. Shop steward Harry Black relishes his new role as the strike secretary as it is more lucrative than his job and allows him to get out of the house, away from his wife Mary who does not realize that Harry is gay. Boyce, the union leader, tries to negotiate between the factory and union representatives.

Meanwhile, Tralala is a prostitute who lures unsuspecting sailors out to a vacant lot to be robbed by Vinnie, an ex-convict and Tralala's pimp. Georgette is a young transgender woman who harbors a crush on Vinnie. Big Joe, one of the striking workers, learns that his daughter Donna is pregnant out of wedlock by Tommy, one of the factory workers known for riding a motorcycle and confronts him at the strike office, leading to a fight. Joe's son Spook admires Tommy and is saving for a motorcycle to impress Tralala. Tommy agrees to marry Donna but the baby is born before the wedding. At the wedding party, Joe again starts a fight with Tommy but they make peace when they realize their fighting is threatening the baby.

Harry meets Regina, another transgender woman, and falls in love with her. Sleeping at Regina's one morning, he misses the arrival of trucks at the factory, which force their way in. The strikers try to prevent the trucks from leaving, which escalates into a riot. The police disperse the riot with water cannons and tear gas and Harry is injured in a fight with one of the strikebreaking drivers, making him a hero to the strikers. Harry introduces Vinnie to Boyce, who takes up an offer from Vinnie to destroy the trucks of the contractor responsible but he then fires Harry after discovering his abuse of expenses and his absence the morning the trucks arrived. Harry returns to Regina, who throws him out. Heartbroken, Harry is badly beaten by Vinnie and his associates after attempting to perform oral sex on Bobby, a young boy.

Tralala also meets Steve, a kindly sailor in Manhattan who appears to truly love her and lets her move in with him. When Steve is eventually sent away to war, he leaves her a note expressing his hope that he will return from the war to rekindle their relationship. Depressed, she goes to one of her old haunts and drunkenly exposes her breasts to a mixed group of locals and sailors before encouraging the men to have sex with her. This escalates into a gang rape. Tralala is left catatonic on a mattress, where Spook finds her.

At Tommy and Donna's wedding, Boyce announces that management has caved to their demands and the factory will reopen on Monday, prompting celebration. On Monday, as they return to work, Joe eventually welcomes Tommy to the family and offers him marital advice if he ever needs it.

== Cast ==
- Stephen Lang as Harry Black
- Jennifer Jason Leigh as Tralala
- Burt Young as Big Joe
- Peter Dobson as Vinnie
- Jerry Orbach as Boyce
- Stephen Baldwin as Sal
- Frank Military as Steve
- Jason Andrews as Tony
- James Lorinz as Freddy
- Sam Rockwell as Al
- Maia Danziger as Mary Black
- Camille Saviola as Ella
- Ricki Lake as Donna
- Cameron Johann as Spook
- John Costelloe as Tommy
- Christopher Murney as Paulie
- Alexis Arquette as Georgette
- Zette as Regina
- Mark Boone Junior as Willie
- Mike Starr as Security Guard
- Rutanya Alda as Georgette's Mother
- Brent Katz as Bobby

== Production ==
=== Development ===
There had been several attempts to adapt Hubert Selby Jr.'s Last Exit to Brooklyn into a film since the controversial book's 1964 publication. One of the earliest attempts was made by producer Steve Krantz and animator Ralph Bakshi, who wanted to direct a live-action film based on the novel. Bakshi had sought out the rights to the novel after completing Heavy Traffic, a film which shared many themes with Selby's novel. Selby agreed to the adaptation, and actor Robert De Niro accepted the role of Harry Black in Strike. According to Bakshi, "the whole thing fell apart when Krantz and I had a falling out over past business. It was a disappointment to me and Selby. Selby and I tried a few other screenplays after that on other subjects, but I could not shake Last Exit from my mind." An adaptation was also considered by Stanley Kubrick and Brian de Palma at one point.

German producer Bernd Eichinger and director Uli Edel had been wanting to adapt the novel for 20 years, with the latter having first discovered the novel as a university student. The two filmmakers obtained the rights to Selby's novel in the mid-1980s after Edel's success with the film Christiane F. One of the challenges of adapting Selby's book was combining its different stories and characters into one film. Screenwriter Desmond Nakano was brought on to pen the screenplay.

=== Filming ===
Filming took place over 14 weeks in the summer of 1988 on location in the Red Hook section of Brooklyn, "only blocks from the housing projects where Mr. Selby lived while writing Last Exit." Some scenes for the film were shot at Montero's Bar and Grill, which was owned by Pilar Montero and her husband Joseph. As the gang-rape scene was about to be shot, Jennifer Jason Leigh stood up before the mob of actors and said, "Don't forget, it's only acting." There was an awed silence, then the actors broke into applause.

== Reception ==
=== Release ===
The film was first released in Europe in 1989, where it was a critical and a commercial success. The film had a limited distribution in the United States in May 1990 after delays to its release date. Some theaters, such as the Edwards Theatres in Orange County, declined to show the film because of its dark and graphic subject matter.

=== Critical response ===
The film has a 67% rating on review aggregator website Rotten Tomatoes based on 21 critics' reviews. Metacritic, which uses a weighted average, assigned the film a score of 62 out of 100, based on 21 critics, indicating "generally favorable" reviews.

Though critics noted the film's unrelenting bleakness and how it is not an easy watch, Last Exit to Brooklyn was also praised for Uli Edel's direction and the performances of its actors. Vincent Canby of The New York Times wrote the film "is both grim and eloquent. The strike scenes are some of the roughest ever seen in a fiction film." Canby added the film "has a European sensibility that works to the advantage of its American subject matter...[and] sees everything at the distance of a sober-minded alien observer. One result is that Last Exit to Brooklyn never appears to exploit its sensational subject matter." He concluded the film "suggests that physical, social, psychological and political degradation can only be understood when seen in something like their true dimensions. Without hope." In a review that awarded 3.5 stars out of 4, Roger Ebert in The Chicago Sun-Times wrote the characters "are limited in their freedom to imagine greater happiness for themselves, and yet in their very misery they embody human striving. There is more of humanity in a prostitute trying to truly love, if only for a moment, than in all of the slow-motion romantic fantasies in the world." Ebert and Gene Siskel gave the film "two thumbs up" on their syndicated At the Movies review show, saying Last Exist to Brookly had exceptionally good cinematography and realistic characters struggling with everyday dillemas which emphasized their common humanity in an engaging manner.

Sheila Benson of the Los Angeles Times wrote, "The strike-breaking attempt at the factory is Last Exit’s vast visual set-piece, a long and magnificently staged mass of moving bodies and machinery that shows Edel’s accomplished and painterly eye and the remarkable camera work of Stefan Czapsky." Benson singled out Jennifer Jason Leigh as the "defiantly tragic Tralala, [Jerry Ohrbach’s] [sic] implacable union leader, Stephen Lang’s self-hating Harry Black and Alexis Arquette’s dry wit-over-desperation as Georgette" as the film's standout performances.

== Accolades ==
For her role as Tralala in this film and her role in Miami Blues, Jennifer Jason Leigh won the New York Film Critics Circle Award for Best Supporting Actress at the 1990 New York Film Critics Circle Awards and the Boston Society of Film Critics Award for Best Supporting Actress at the Boston Society of Film Critics Awards 1990.

== Home media ==
Last Exit to Brooklyn was released on Blu-ray by Summit Entertainment in October 2011.

== See also ==
- Last Exit to Brooklyn (soundtrack)
- List of hood films
