= Blue Eyes and Exit Wounds =

Studio album by Nick Tosches and Hubert Selby Jr.
- Released: 1998
- Recorded: October 4, 1997
- Genre: Spoken word, poetry

Nick Tosches and Hubert Selby Jr. chronology
Blue Eyes and Exit Wounds (1998)	Nick & Homer (1998)

Blue Eyes and Exit Wounds is a spoken word/poetry album by Nick Tosches and Hubert Selby Jr.

== Track listing ==
1. In the Heat of the Night (excerpt)
2. Only the Lonely
3. La Vie en Rose
4. A Tale of Anticipation
5. Psalm 16 (Song of Forgiveness)
6. It Takes One to Know One
7. What the Coptic Guy Said
8. A Feast for the Eyes
9. From the Dream-Book of Artemidorus
10. My Kind of Loving
11. Contrapasso
12. Ptolemy II
13. May the Gods without Names Redeem Me
14. Erebos
15. I with a Knife to the Throat of Cybele
16. Dante in Ravenna
17. I Dig Girls

Tracks 1–6 are written and performed by Hubert Selby Jr. Tracks 7–17 were written and performed by Nick Tosches.

== Personnel ==
- Nick Tosches – vocals, texts
- Hubert Selby Jr. – vocals, texts
- Harold Goldberg – production
- Dan Bosworth – engineering
- Scott Lawrence Whitman – photography and design
