= Hubert Selby Jr.: It/ll Be Better Tomorrow =

- Directed by: Michael W. Dean; Kenneth Shiffrin
- Produced by: Michael W. Dean; Ryan Brown
- Starring: Hubert Selby Jr. Henry Rollins; Lou Reed; Jared Leto; Darren Aronofsky
- Narrated by: Robert Downey Jr.
- Edited by: Ryan Brown
- Release date: 2005
- Running time: 79 minutes
- Country: United States
- Language: English

Hubert Selby Jr.: It/ll Be Better Tomorrow is a 2005 documentary film about writer Hubert Selby Jr.

The film's title It/ll Be Better Tomorrow is taken from Selby's novel, The Demon. The slash is included in Selby's typography.

In the film, Selby explains that, on his manual typewriter, an apostrophe meant typing an "uppercase 8", so it was simpler to use a slash. Selby objects to apostrophes generally, preferring the spelling "dont" to "don't".

The 79-minute film features new interviews with Selby, known by his nickname "Cubby", as well as Lou Reed, Ellen Burstyn, Jared Leto, James Remar, Darren Aronofsky, Uli Edel, Gilbert Sorrentino, Nick Tosches, Jerry Stahl, Richard Price, Amiri Baraka, James Ragan, Michael Silverblatt, Jem Cohen, Kenneth Shiffrin, Nicolas Winding Refn, Desmond Nakano, Susan Compo, and Kaytie Lee with archival appearances by Henry Rollins and Anthony Kiedis. The film is narrated by Robert Downey Jr.

== Crew ==
The film is directed by Michael W. Dean and Kenneth Shiffrin. The editor is Ryan Brown.

The film's executive producers are Selby's wife Suzanne Selby and Kenneth Shiffrin, who was Selby's writing partner on three projects including the screenplay, Scardust.
