= Dino (biography) =

Dino: Living High in the Dirty Business of Dreams
- First edition
- Author: Nick Tosches
- Language: English
- Genre: Biography, Music
- Publisher: Doubleday (USA); Secker & Warburg (UK)
- Publication date: June 1, 1992 (USA)
- Publication place: United States
- Media type: Print (Hardback, Paperback)
- Pages: 572 pp (hardback first edition)
- ISBN: 0-385-26216-7
- Dewey Decimal: 791/.092 B 20
- LC Class: PN2287.M52 T6 1992

Dino: Living High in the Dirty Business of Dreams is a biography of Dean Martin written by Nick Tosches. It draws heavily from interviews Tosches did with Jerry Lewis, and with Martin's second wife and lifelong friend Jeanne Biegger. The story begins with the births of Martin's grandparents in Italy and follows his entire life up to the point of publication. It also includes sections in which Tosches writes in the first person from the point of view of Martin, a gonzo journalism style which would be used more frequently in his later non-fiction works.

== Critical reception ==
The Los Angeles Times wrote: "A dazzling stylist, Tosches operates like a be-bop sax player, using Martin’s resume as his basic melody, then bursting into frenzied improvisational solos as he tries to liven up Dino’s lowbrow antics."
