= The Last Opium Den =

2002 book by Nick Tosches

- First edition
- Author: Nick Tosches
- Language: English
- Genre: Journalism, Travel
- Publisher: Bloomsbury USA (US)
- Publication date: January 5, 2002 (US)
- Publication place: United States
- Media type: Print (Hardback)
- Pages: 72 pp (hardback first edition)
- ISBN: 1-58234-227-X
- Dewey Decimal: 362.29/3/092 B 21
- LC Class: HV5816 .T67 2002

The Last Opium Den is an investigative journalism/travel book by Nick Tosches. It was originally an article in Vanity Fair, where Tosches is a contributing editor. Tosches travels the world (in particular, Southeast Asia) seeking the titular establishment. He also spends time discussing the heroin/opium trade, the history of opium dens, wine tasting, and the historical use of opium to treat symptoms of diabetes.

== See also ==
- Confessions of an English Opium-Eater
