= Last Exit to Brooklyn =

1964 novel by Hubert Selby Jr

- First edition
- Author: Hubert Selby Jr.
- Cover artist: Roy Kuhlman
- Language: English
- Genre: Transgressive fiction
- Publisher: Grove Press
- Publication date: 1964
- Publication place: United States
- Media type: Print (hardback & paperback)
- Pages: 320 pp
- OCLC: 18568386
- Followed by: The Room

Last Exit to Brooklyn is a 1964 novel by American author Hubert Selby Jr. The novel takes a harsh, uncompromising look at lower class Brooklyn in the 1950s written in spare, stripped-down prose.

Critics and fellow writers praised the book on its release. Due to its frank portrayals of taboo subjects, such as drug use, street violence, gang rape, homophobia, prostitution, and domestic violence, it was the subject of an obscenity trial in the United Kingdom and was banned in Italy.

== Synopsis ==
The stories are set almost entirely in what is now considered the Sunset Park section of Brooklyn; the location is widely misreported as Red Hook, where one story is set and parts of the 1989 movie were filmed. Last Exit to Brooklyn is divided into six parts that can, more or less, be read separately. Each part is prefaced with a passage from the Bible.

- Another Day, Another Dollar: A gang of young Brooklyn hoodlums hang around an all-night diner and get into a vicious fight with a group of Army soldiers on leave.
- The Queen Is Dead: Georgette, a sassy transgender prostitute, is thrown out of the family home by her homophobic brother and tries to attract the attention of a ruthless hoodlum named Vinnie at a benzedrine-driven party.
- And Baby Makes Three: A story told by an unknown narrator about a couple, Suzy and Tommy, who have a baby out of wedlock, their wedding, and the baby's christening party which is quickly thrown by Suzy's parents.
- Tralala: The title character of an earlier Selby short story, she is a young Brooklyn prostitute who makes a living propositioning sailors in bars and stealing their money. In perhaps the novel's most notorious scene, she is brutally gang-raped after a night of heavy drinking. She is left for dead in a vacant lot.
- Strike: Harry, a machinist in a factory, becomes a local official in the union. He is a closeted gay man, he abuses his wife, and he tries to boast of his accomplishments and his high status to anyone who might listen to convince himself that he is a man. He gains a temporary status and importance during a long strike, and uses the union's money to entertain the young street punks and buy the company of drag queens and gay men. He is ultimately beaten viciously by the hoodlums from the opening chapter, after he forcibly fellates a 10-year-old boy.
- Landsend: Described as a "coda" for the book, this section presents the intertwined, yet ordinary day of numerous denizens in a housing project.

== Style ==
Last Exit to Brooklyn was written in an idiosyncratic style that ignores most conventions of grammar. Selby wrote most of the prose as if it were a story told from one friend to another at a bar rather than a novel, using coarse and casual language. He used slang-like conjunctions of words, such as tahell for "to hell" and yago for "you go." The paragraphs were often written in a stream of consciousness style with many parentheses and fragments. Selby often indented new paragraphs to the middle or end of the line.

Selby did not use quotation marks to distinguish dialogue but instead merely blended it into the text. He used a slash instead of an apostrophe mark for contractions and did not use an apostrophe at all for possessives.

== Publication history ==
Last Exit to Brooklyn started as The Queen Is Dead, one of several short stories Selby wrote about people he had met around Brooklyn while working as a copywriter and general laborer. The piece was published in three literary magazines in the late 1950s and early 1960s.

Tralala first appeared in The Provincetown Review in 1961, drawing criticism which resulted in an obscenity trial.

The pieces later evolved into the full-length book, which was published in 1964 by Grove Press, which had previously published such controversial authors as William S. Burroughs and Henry Miller.

Critics praised and censured the publication. Poet Allen Ginsberg said that it will "explode like a rusty hellish bombshell over America and still be eagerly read in a hundred years."

== Trial ==
The rights for the British edition were acquired by Marion Boyars and John Calder and the novel ended up in the hands of the Director of Public Prosecutions. The manuscript was published in January 1966, received positive reviews and sold almost 14,000 copies. The director of Blackwell's bookshop in Oxford complained to the DPP about the detailed depictions of brutality and cruelty in the book but the DPP did not pursue the allegations.

Cyril Black, the then-Conservative Member of Parliament for Wimbledon, initiated a private prosecution of the novel before Marlborough Street Magistrates' Court, under judge Leo Gradwell. The public prosecutor brought an action under Section 3 of the Obscene Publications Act. During the hearing the Chief Metropolitan Magistrate ordered that all copies of the book within the jurisdiction of the magistrates' court be seized. Not a single bookseller possessed a copy, but the publishing offices of Calder and Boyars, within the Bow Street Magistrate's jurisdiction, were discovered to be in possession of three copies. The books were duly seized, and Boyars was summoned to show cause why they should not be forfeited. Expert witnesses spoke, "unprecedentedly," for the prosecution: they included the publishers Basil Blackwell and Robert Maxwell. On the defense side were the scholars Al Alvarez II, and Professor Frank Kermode, who had previously compared the work to Charles Dickens. Others who provided rebuttal evidence included H. Montgomery Hyde.

The order had no effect beyond the borders of the Marlborough Street Court, the London neighborhood of Soho. At the hearing Calder declared that the book would continue to be published and would be sold everywhere else outside of that jurisdiction. In response the prosecutor brought criminal charges under Section 2 of the Act, which entitled the defendants to trial by jury under Section 4.

The jury was all male. Judge Graham Rogers directed that the women "might be embarrassed at having to read a book which dealt with homosexuality, prostitution, drug-taking and sexual perversion." The trial lasted nine days; on November 23 the jury returned a guilty verdict.

In 1968, an appeal issued by lawyer and writer John Mortimer resulted in a judgment by Justice Geoffrey Lane that reversed the ruling. The case marked a turning point in British censorship laws. By that time, the novel had sold over 33,000 hardback and 500,000 paperback copies in the United States.

== Film adaptation ==
In 1989, director Uli Edel helmed a film adaptation of the novel.

== See also ==
- The Queen Is Dead: the title of the 1986 album by the Smiths is taken from the book.
- Last Exit on Brooklyn, a Seattle coffeehouse named in homage to the book
- "Last Exit to Springfield", an episode of The Simpsons, which parodied the title
- Alt-J, British band composed a song entitled "Fitzpleasure", inspired by the novel.
- The Novembers, a Japanese band, composed the song "Last Exit to Brooklyn".
- The Velvet Underground song "Sister Ray"'s lyrics are based on a scene in the novel.
- "Es ist soweit" from the album "Herzlichen Glückwunsch" by German rock band Spliff is taking cues from the novel.
