= The Room (novel) =

1971 novel by Hubert Selby Jr.

- First edition
- Author: Hubert Selby Jr.
- Language: English
- Genre: Modern tragedy, stream of consciousness
- Publisher: Grove Press
- Publication date: 1971
- Publication place: United States
- Media type: Print
- Pages: 288
- Preceded by: Last Exit to Brooklyn
- Followed by: The Demon

The Room is the second novel by Hubert Selby Jr., first published in 1971.

== Plot ==
The novel centers on a nameless petty criminal locked in a remand cell awaiting trial for a crime only vaguely defined. As the novel progresses the man surrenders himself to self-pity and hatred, constructing elaborate fantasies of revenge and the torture he wishes to inflict on the officers who, he believes, falsely arrested him.

== Reception ==
Selby described the critical reception of the book as "the greatest reviews I've ever read in my life", although in reality it was not well received. The novel was regarded by Selby as the most disturbing book ever written, and Selby stated that he himself was unable to read it again for 20 years. At least one reviewer has expressed similar feelings, with claims that reading the novel made him physically sick. It has been described as "a terrifying journey into the darkest corners of the psyche."

== In popular culture ==
A section of The Room is used in Richard Linklater's Waking Life, where a red-faced man in a jail cell describes in vivid detail the abuse he intends to inflict once he is released.

The 2008 death metal track "Beg, You Dogs" by the band Benediction is based on the book.
