= Power on Earth =

1986 book by Nick Tosches

- Author: Nick Tosches
- Language: English
- Genre: Biography, Crime
- Publisher: Arbor House (US)
- Publication date: August 1986 (US)
- Publication place: United States
- Media type: Print (Hardback)
- Pages: 290 pp (hardback first edition)
- ISBN: 0-670-74990-7
- Dewey Decimal: 823/.912 19
- LC Class: PR6045.A812 O5 1984

Power on Earth is a biography of Mafia-linked Italian banker and accused murderer Michele Sindona written by Nick Tosches. Based on his own in-depth research, including several interviews with Sindona himself while he was in prison awaiting trial, Tosches tells Sindona's rise from poor beginnings to becoming one of the world's most powerful bankers. It also details his connections with the Gambino crime family, the Vatican Bank, the Franklin National Bank in Long Island, New York, and the murder of Giorgio Ambrosoli, a lawyer overseeing the liquidation of his banks.

== Foreign Editions ==
- (Italian) Il mistero Sindona. le memorie e le rivelazioni di Michele Sindona (Published in Milano by editor SugarCo in 1986. 316 pages) Dewey class: 332.1
- (German) Geschäfte mit dem Vatikan. Die Affäre Sindona. München 1987. ISBN 3-426-03970-2
