= Veigar Margeirsson =

Icelandic composer

- Born: June 6, 1972 (age 54); Iceland
- Occupation: composer
- Website: veigar.com

Veigar Margeirsson (born 6 June 1972) is a film score composer from Iceland. He composed the original score for Eric Schaeffer's 2004 film Mind the Gap. He was also one of the composers who arranged and orchestrated Clint Mansell's Lux Aeterna from Requiem for a Dream for full orchestra and choir for The Lord of the Rings: The Two Towers trailer. The piece, named "Requiem for a Tower", was made exclusively for the trailer and was featured in neither Requiem for a Dream nor The Lord of the Rings film trilogy.

He has also composed music for the concert hall, including the saxophone concerto Rætur (Roots, 2007), based on Icelandic folk songs. The work was composed for the Icelandic saxophonist Sigurður Flosason and premiered by him and the Iceland Symphony Orchestra in 2007.

== See also ==
- Trailer music
