= The Devil and Sonny Liston =

2000 book by Nick Tosches

- First edition
- Author: Nick Tosches
- Language: English
- Genre: Biography, Music, Journalism
- Publisher: Little, Brown (USA)
- Publication date: April 2000 (USA)
- Publication place: United States
- Media type: Print (Hardback, Paperback)
- Pages: 272 pp (hardback first edition)
- ISBN: 0-316-89775-2
- Dewey Decimal: 796.83/092 B 21
- LC Class: GV1132.L53 T68 2000

The Devil and Sonny Liston is a biography of world heavyweight champion boxer Sonny Liston by Nick Tosches. The book's title is a reference to the story "The Devil and Daniel Webster". Tosches' intended title was "Night Train" after one of Liston's favorite songs. It was changed at the behest of his publisher in order to avoid potential confusion with the novel of the same name by Martin Amis.

Among the controversial topics covered are Liston's disputed birth date, his alleged mob ties, corruption in the professional boxing world, the 1964 Liston-Clay fight in which Liston claimed to have a shoulder injury, the 1965 Liston-Ali fight and the so-called "phantom punch", and Liston's alleged heroin overdose death in 1970.
