= King of Judea =

King of Judah may refer the kings of one of the ancient dynasties based in Jerusalem:

- Kings of Judah, as named in the Hebrew bible
- Hasmonean dynasty
- Herodian kingdom

== See also ==
- King of the Jews (disambiguation)
- Judah (disambiguation)
