= The Demon (novel) =

1976 novel by Hubert Selby, Jr.

- First edition
- Author: Hubert Selby, Jr.
- Language: English
- Genre: Psychological fiction
- Publisher: Playboy Press
- Publication date: 1976
- Publication place: United States
- Media type: Print
- Pages: 312
- Preceded by: The Room
- Followed by: Requiem for a Dream

The Demon is the third novel by Hubert Selby, Jr., first published in 1976.

== Overview ==
The story of Harry White, a man haunted by lust and an insane need for sin and retribution.

== Influence ==
It was Andy Kaufman’s favorite book and he said of it, “That’s my mind in a nutshell.“
