= Pilar Montero =

- Born: Maria Pilar Rivas; December 2, 1921; Manhattan, New York
- Died: January 14, 2012 (aged 90); Brooklyn, USA
- Occupation: Bar owner
- Known for: Owner of Montero’s Bar and Grill
- Spouse(s): Joseph Montero (m. 1943, died 1999)
- Children: 4
- Parent(s): Francisco and Rita Rivas

Pilar Montero (December 2, 1921 – January 14, 2012), was the owner of Montero’s Bar and Grill in Brooklyn, where she worked into her 80s.

== Life ==
She moved to Brooklyn from Manhattan when she was very young, and she and her husband Joseph opened the bar in 1945; Joseph died in 1999. Joseph Montero's sister Emma and her husband Buddy, according to Pilar Montero, bought a grocery store on State Street from Pilar and her godson's father, who each sold them half for $800. However, in 1951 the Brooklyn-Queens Expressway came along and cut the grocery store off, so Emma and Buddy closed it. They later rented the space to artists and artisans, and in 2003 their granddaughter Marissa Alperin opened it as a jewelry store; she sold jewelry to Pilar. As of 2006, there was still a rift between Pilar and Emma due to the grocery store closing. Pilar's obituary was included in The Socialite who Killed a Nazi with Her Bare Hands: And 144 Other Fascinating People who Died this Year, a collection of New York Times obituaries published in 2012.

== Montero's Bar and Grill ==
Montero's Bar and Grill has been used as a backdrop by fashion photographers, as a location to shoot scenes for the 1989 film Last Exit to Brooklyn, and as a place where the model Twiggy posed. Frank McCourt, who lived in an apartment upstairs from the bar, wrote in his memoir Teacher Man how the bar's neon sign was “turning my front room from scarlet to black to scarlet.”

Montero's is still open as of 2025.
