= Cut Numbers =

1988 novel by Nick Tosches

- Author: Nick Tosches
- Language: English
- Genre: Novel
- Publisher: Harmony (USA)
- Publication date: June 15, 1988 (USA)
- Publication place: United States
- Media type: Print (Hardback & Paperback)
- Pages: 233 pp (hardback first edition)
- ISBN: 0-517-56870-5
- Dewey Decimal: 813/.54 19
- LC Class: PS3570.O74 C88 1988

Cut Numbers is the first novel by Nick Tosches. It involves small-time criminals struggling to maintain the financial viability of their cut numbers game after the implementation of the New York Lottery. They establish an elaborate scheme to fix the legitimate state lottery. The main character is Louie Brunellesches, who also appears in Tosches' novel In the Hand of Dante.

== See also ==
- Lucky Numbers, a 2000 Nora Ephron/John Travolta film dealing with a similar lottery scheme.
