= King of the Jews (book) =

2005 book by Nick Tosches

- Author: Nick Tosches
- Language: English
- Genre: Biography, Crime, Journalism
- Publisher: Ecco (USA)
- Publication date: May 3, 2005 (USA)
- Publication place: United States
- Media type: Print (Hardback, Paperback)
- Pages: 336 pp (hardback first edition)
- ISBN: 0-06-621118-2
- Dewey Decimal: 364.152/3/097471 22
- LC Class: HV6534.N5 T67 2005

King of the Jews is a book by Nick Tosches. On the surface it is a biography of Arnold Rothstein, the man who reputedly fixed the 1919 World Series, inspired the characters of Meyer Wolfsheim in The Great Gatsby and Nathan Detroit in Guys and Dolls, and created the modern system of organized crime.

The book also contains numerous digressions away from its main subject, including: an extended linguistic discussion of transformation of the Hebrews from a polytheistic to monotheistic religion, early 20th-century European Jewish culture, acknowledging the lack of real information on the life of Rothstein, several instances of the author breaking from the various narratives to speak in the first person to the reader, and a repeating motif involving Jesus having sex with a woman.

The book began as an article in Vanity Fair, for which Tosches was a contributing editor.
