= Country (book) =

1977 book by Nick Tosches

Country: The Biggest Music in America
- First Edition (published by Stein & Day), 1977
- Author: Nick Tosches
- Publication date: 1977

Country was the first book published by music journalist Nick Tosches. Released in 1977 under the title Country: The Biggest Music in America, it was retitled in later editions as Country: Living Legends and Dying Metaphors in America's Biggest Music and Country: The Twisted Roots of Rock and Roll.

Rather than a detailed, chronological study of country music, the book is arranged like a fan's scrapbook, leaping across time and subject. Throughout Country, Tosches makes a point of paying tribute to pivotal but under-sung figures in country, hillbilly, and blues music, including Emmett Miller, Cliff Carlisle, and Val and Pete. The author also traces the origins of some traditional country songs as variations on centuries-old English broadside ballads and even older works.

Marked by Tosches’ thorough research and gritty, reportorial writing style, the book uncovers details about many of country music's major and minor figures – from such early stars as Jimmie Rodgers and Bob Wills, who began their careers singing in blackface minstrel shows; to singer Bill Haley, in a chapter on the rise of rock and roll from honky-tonk music and early rhythm and blues.

Tosches also pays tribute to early scholars and critics writing about country, such as Emma Bell Miles, whose 1904 essay "Some Real American Music" Tosches called "the most beautiful prose written of country music."

Creem featured three excerpted chapters from the book in 1978.
