= Lux Aeterna (Mansell) =

Orchestral piece for the film Requiem for a Dream

"Lux Æterna"

Composition by Clint Mansell

from the album Requiem for a Dream soundtrack
- Released: 2000
- Recorded: 2000
- Genre: 21st-century classical music
- Length: 3:54
- Label: Nonesuch Records
- Songwriter: Clint Mansell
- Producer: Kronos Quartet

Lux Æterna (Classical Latin: [ˈluːks ae̯ˈtɛrna], Ecclesiastical Latin: [ˈluks eˈterna]; "eternal light") is an orchestral composition by Clint Mansell. Performed by the Kronos Quartet, it forms a leitmotif in the 2000 film Requiem for a Dream, and is the penultimate piece in the movie's soundtrack.

A re-orchestrated version of the composition, titled "Requiem for a Tower", was created for the trailer of The Lord of the Rings: The Two Towers in 2002.

== Remixes ==
The track Zoo York on Paul Oakenfold's album Bunkka features Lux Aeterna while Throw It Up on Lil Jon & the East Side Boyz's Kings of Crunk adds a trap beat and rap rhymes.

== In popular culture ==
Both "Lux Aeterna" and the re-orchestrated version, "Requiem for a Tower" that was created for the trailer of The Lord of the Rings: The Two Towers, have been used in multiple forms of media, including the film trailers for The Da Vinci Code, I Am Legend, Sunshine and Babylon A.D.; trailers for the video games Assassin's Creed and Lord of the Rings: Return of the King; advertising campaigns for such products as Canon PowerShot cameras, Molson Canadian and Canadian wireless carrier Telus; and on television such as in the series So You Think You Can Dance as well as a promo spot for the series Flash Forward.

== Requiem for a Tower ==
Corner Stone Cues Presents: "Requiem For A Tower"

Soundtrack album by Corner Stone Cues
- Released: 26 March 2006
- Genres: Trailer Score; Soundtrack
- Length: 24:46
- Producers: Corner Stone Cues, Howling Entertainment

A re-orchestrated version of "Lux Aeterna", titled "Requiem for a Tower", was arranged by composers Simone Benyacar, Dan Nielsen and Veigar Margeirsson for the trailer of The Lord of the Rings: The Two Towers. "Requiem for a Tower" features a choir and full orchestra.

Although never intended for release, after considerable demand by fans the re-recording(s) were made available as part of the Requiem for a Tower album release from Corner Stone Cues. While the release was originally made physically, production was discontinued indefinitely with increased digital sales of the album on major electronic music distributors iTunes and Amazon MP3.

=== Corner Stone Cues release ===
Corner Stone Cues Presents: Requiem For A Tower (24:46)
No.	Title	Length
1.	"Requiem For A Tower Mvt II" (Veigar Margeirsson / Clint Mansell)	0:57
2.	"Requiem For A Tower Mvt III" (Simone Benyacar / Craig Stuart Garfinkle / Clint Mansell)	0:49
3.	"Requiem For A Tower Mvt IV" (Dan Nielsen / Clint Mansell)	0:41
4.	"Wicked" (Simone Benyacar / Craig Stuart Garfinkle /)	2:39
5.	"J.B.D."	2:26
6.	"Betrayal & Redemption"	2:40
7.	"Threshold"	2:03
8.	"Shining Path (L.U.2.P.)"	2:39
9.	"Leather Tomb"	1:58
10.	"Ghost in the Trees"	2:06
11.	"Azure"	4:16
12.	"Forest Chase"	1:34
