= Nick Tosches =

American writer (1949–2019)

- Born: October 23, 1949; Newark, New Jersey, U.S.
- Died: October 20, 2019 (aged 69); Manhattan, New York, U.S.
- Occupations: Biographer; essayist; journalist; novelist; poet
- Website: nicktosches.com

Nicholas P. Tosches (/ˈtɑːʃəs/; October 23, 1949 – October 20, 2019) was an American journalist, novelist, biographer, and poet. His 1982 biography of Jerry Lee Lewis, Hellfire, was praised by Rolling Stone magazine as "the best rock and roll biography ever written."

== Biography ==
Tosches was born in Newark, New Jersey, on October 23, 1949. His grandfather emigrated from Italy to New York City in the late 19th century. His grandparents were Arbëreshë from Casalvecchio di Puglia in Apulia.

According to his own account, Tosches "barely finished high school". He did not attend college but was published for the first time in Fusion magazine at 19 years old. He also held a variety of jobs, including working as a porter for his family's business in New Jersey, as a paste-up artist for the Lovable underwear company in New York City, and later, in the early 1970s, as a snake hunter for the Miami Serpentarium, in Florida. A fan of early rock and roll and "oddball" records, he wrote for several rock music magazines, including Creem and Rolling Stone. He was also reviews editor for Country Music magazine. He has been described as "the best example of a good rock journalist who set out to transcend his genre and succeeded," and as someone who "along with Lester Bangs, Richard Meltzer and a handful of other noble notables from the era... elevated rock writing to a new plateau." He was fired by Rolling Stone for collaborating with Meltzer in filing record reviews under each other's byline.

Tosches' first book, Country: The Biggest Music in America (later retitled Country: The Twisted Roots of Rock and Roll), was first published in 1977. It was followed in 1982 by Hellfire, a biography of Jerry Lee Lewis, and in 1984 by Unsung Heroes of Rock 'n' Roll: The Birth of Rock in the Wild Years Before Elvis. He subsequently wrote biographies of the singer and entertainer Dean Martin, the Sicilian financier Michele Sindona, the heavyweight boxer Sonny Liston, the country singer Emmett Miller, the soul/rock band Hall & Oates and the racketeer Arnold Rothstein.

Tosches worked as a contributing editor of Vanity Fair magazine. His work was also published in Esquire and Open City. He published five novels, Cut Numbers (1988), Trinities (1994), In the Hand of Dante (2002), Me and the Devil (2012), and Under Tiberius (2015); and a collection of poetry, Chaldea and I Dig Girls (1999). He also worked on Never Trust a Loving God, a book he did in collaboration with his friend the French painter Thierry Alonso Gravleur. He described his literary influences as "Hesiod, Sappho, Christopher Marlowe, Ezra Pound, William Faulkner, Charles Olson, and God knows who else." A compendium, The Nick Tosches Reader, collects writings from over the course of his career.

Tosches was featured on the Travel Channel show Anthony Bourdain: No Reservations in the episode "Disappearing Manhattan", in which he and Bourdain shared a drink at Sophie's in the East Village, a Manhattan dive bar, and discussed the changing nature of the city.

Tosches died on October 20, 2019, at his home in Manhattan, three days before his 70th birthday.

=== Influence and admiration ===
Actor Johnny Depp has stated that he is fan of the author. "I always feel really lucky after I've read one of Tosches's books because it's like you've had this experience with him. And it's funny because hanging out with him is very much like being in one of his books." Depp's enthusiasm for Tosches's works even goes so far that he bought his literary estate for 1.2 million dollars.

== Bibliography ==
=== Biographies ===
- 1982 – Hellfire: The Jerry Lee Lewis Story. New York: Dell Publishing. 1982. ISBN 9780440535492.
- 1984 – with Hall, Daryl & Oates, John (1984). Dangerous Dances: The Authorized Biography. New York: St. Martin's Press. ISBN 9780312357160.
- 1986 – Power on Earth. New York: Arbor House. 1986. ISBN 9780877957966.
- 1992 – Dino: Living High in the Dirty Business of Dreams. New York: Doubleday. 1992. ISBN 9780385262163.
- 2000 – The Devil and Sonny Liston. Boston: Little, Brown and Company. 2000. ISBN 9780316897754.
- 2001 – Where Dead Voices Gather. London: Little, Brown and Company. August 21, 2001. ISBN 9780316895071.
- 2005 – King of the Jews. New York: Ecco. May 3, 2005. ISBN 9780066211183.

=== Fiction and poetry ===
- 1988 – Cut Numbers. New York: Harmony Books. 1988. ISBN 9780517568705.
- 1994 – Trinities. New York: Doubleday. 1994. ISBN 9780385470032.
- 1999 – Chaldea and I Dig Girls. New York: CUZ Editions. 1998. ISBN 9780966632859.
- 2002 – In the Hand of Dante. Boston: Little, Brown and Company. ISBN 9780316735643.
- 2012 – Me and the Devil. New York: Little, Brown and Company. 2012. ISBN 9780316120975.
- 2014 – Johnny's First Cigarette. Sénouillac: Vagabonde. 2014. ISBN 9782919067138.
- 2015 – Under Tiberius. New York: Little, Brown and Company. August 4, 2015. ISBN 9780316405652.

=== Journalism ===
- 1977 – Country: The Biggest Music in America. New York: Stein and Day. 1977. ISBN 9780440514404.
- 1984 – Unsung Heroes Of Rock 'n' Roll, 1st ed. New York: C. Scribner's Sons. 1984. ISBN 9780684181493.
- 1991 – Unsung Heroes Of Rock 'n' Roll, 2nd ed. New York: Harmony Books. 1991. ISBN 9780517580523.
- 1999 – Unsung Heroes Of Rock 'n' Roll, 3rd ed. New York: Da Capo Press. May 7, 1999. ISBN 9780306808913.
- 2002 – The Last Opium Den. New York: Bloomsbury. January 2002. ISBN 9781582342276.
- 2009 – Never Trust a Loving God. New York: Somogy Éditions d'art. 2009. ISBN 9782757202647.
- 2011 – Save the Last Dance for Satan. New York: Kicks Books. 2011. ISBN 9780965977739.

=== Collections ===
- 2000 – The Nick Tosches Reader. New York: Da Capo Press. April 7, 2000. ISBN 9780306809699.

== Discography ==
- Blue Eyes and Exit Wounds, with Hubert Selby Jr., produced by the author Harold Goldberg, 1998
- Nick & Homer, with Homer Henderson, 1998
- Fuckthelivingfuckthedead, 2001
- For the taking: Vol. I from CHALDEA
- Autohagiography, with Austin Brookner, 2018

== Film and television appearances ==
- Louis Prima: The Wildest!, 1999
- Hubert Selby Jr: It/ll Be Better Tomorrow, 2005
- Buy the Ticket, Take the Ride: Hunter S. Thompson on Film, 2006
- Anthony Bourdain: No Reservations in the episode "Disappearing Manhattan", 2009
