= Hubert Selby Jr. =

American writer

- Born: July 23, 1928; Brooklyn, New York, U.S.
- Died: April 26, 2004 (aged 75); Highland Park, Los Angeles, California, U.S.
- Occupations: Novelist; poet; screenwriter
- Writing career
- Notable works: Last Exit to Brooklyn, The Room, Requiem for a Dream
- Movements: Modernism, Beat Generation

Hubert "Cubby" Selby Jr. (July 23, 1928 – April 26, 2004) was an American novelist. Two of his books, Last Exit to Brooklyn (1964) and Requiem for a Dream (1978), were adapted into films, both of which he appeared in.

With no formal writing training, Selby used a raw language to depict the bleak and violent world that encompassed his youth, which would go on to set the stage for his early life. His first novel was prosecuted for obscenity in the United Kingdom and banned in Italy, which prompted defenses from many leading authors such as Anthony Burgess. He has influenced multiple generations of writers. For more than 20 years, he taught creative writing at the University of Southern California in Los Angeles, where he lived full-time after 1983.

== Biography ==
=== Early life and education ===
Hubert Selby was born in 1928 in Brooklyn, New York City, to Adalin and Hubert Selby Sr., a merchant seaman and former coal miner from Kentucky. Selby and his wife Adalin had settled in Bay Ridge. Hubert attended public schools, including the competitive Stuyvesant High School.

Selby Jr. dropped out of school at the age of 15 to work in the city docks before becoming a merchant seaman in 1947.

Having been diagnosed with tuberculosis, he was taken off the ship in Bremen, Germany, and sent back to the United States. For the next three and a half years, Selby was in and out of the U.S. Public Health Hospital (part of a system of hospitals originally established to care for merchant seamen) in New York for treatment.

Selby went through an experimental drug treatment, streptomycin, that later caused some severe complications. During an operation, surgeons removed several of Selby's ribs to reach his lungs. One of his lungs collapsed, and doctors removed part of the other.

=== Becoming a writer ===
For the next ten years, Selby was mostly bedridden; he was frequently hospitalized with a variety of lung-related ailments. The doctors offered a bleak prognosis, suggesting he was unlikely to survive long because he "just didn't have enough lung capacity". Gilbert Sorrentino, a childhood friend who had become a writer, encouraged Selby to write fiction. Unable to have regular work because of his health, Selby decided, "I know the alphabet. Maybe I could be a writer."

He later wrote:

I was sitting at home and had a profound experience. I experienced, in all of my Being, that someday I was going to die, and it wouldn't be like it had been happening, almost dying but somehow staying alive, but I would just die! And two things would happen right before I died: I would regret my entire life; I would want to live it over again. This terrified me. The thought that I would live my entire life, look at it and realize I blew it forced me to do something with my life.

Little concerned with proper grammar, punctuation, or diction, Selby used unorthodox techniques in most of his works. He indented his paragraphs with alternating lengths, often by simply dropping down one line when finished with a paragraph. Like Jack Kerouac in his "spontaneous prose", Selby often completed his writing in a fast, stream-of-consciousness style. He substituted slashes for apostrophes so he would not have to hold down the CAPS key on a typewriter.

=== Early works ===
Selby started working on his first short story, "The Queen Is Dead," in 1958. At the time, he had a succession of day jobs, but he wrote every night. During the day, he worked as a clerk, insurance adjuster, and freelance copywriter. The short story developed slowly for the next six years before he published it.

In 1961, his short story "Tralala" was published in the literary journal The Provincetown Review. It also appeared in Black Mountain Review and New Directions. It portrays the seedy life (ridden with violence, theft and mediocre con-artistry) and the gang rape of a prostitute. The journal editor was arrested for selling pornographic literature to a minor. The journal was used as evidence in an obscenity trial, but the case was later dismissed on appeal.

On 24 October 1964, Selby married Judith Lumino, but the marriage soon fell apart. As he continued to write, his longtime friend LeRoi Jones (later Amiri Baraka), the poet and playwright, encouraged him to contact Sterling Lord, then Kerouac's agent. Selby combined "Tralala", "The Queen Is Dead" and four other loosely linked short stories as part of his first novel, Last Exit to Brooklyn (1964). The novel was accepted and published by Grove Press, which had already published works by William S. Burroughs. In November 1964, The New York Times literary critic Eliot Fremont-Smith described the novel as "a brutal book," concluding that it "is not a book one 'recommends'--except perhaps to writers. From them, those who wish to read it, it deserves attention."

Last Exit to Brooklyn was praised by poet Allen Ginsberg who called it "a rusty, hellish bombshell over America" and the rights for a British edition were bought by Marion Boyars and John Calder who published it in 1966. Politician Cyril Black then brought a private prosecution against the novel to the Marlborough Street Magistrates Court. The Director of Public Prosecutions decided to sue the publishers under section 2 of the 1964 Obscene Publications Act. In 1967, the publishers were tried at the Old Bailey and the jury verdict resulted in the book being banned in Britain. In 1968, the verdict was overturned on appeal when barrister John Mortimer successfully argued that the jury was given insufficient guidance.

Although he wrote all his work while sober, Selby continued to battle drug addiction. In 1967 he was arrested for heroin possession and served two months in the Los Angeles County jail. After his release, he moved from New York to Los Angeles to try to escape his addictions and finally kicked the habit. He stayed clean of illicit drugs but continued to battle alcohol abuse for the next two years. Also that year, Selby met his future wife, Suzanne Victoria Shaw, at a bar in West Hollywood. The couple moved in together two days after they met. They married in 1969, after Selby and his second wife, Judith, had finalized their divorce. For the next decade, Suzanne and Selby traveled back and forth between their home in Southern California and the East Coast, settling permanently in the Los Angeles area in 1983. They had two children, daughter Rachel and son William.

=== Life after Last Exit to Brooklyn ===
In 1971, Selby published his second novel, The Room. It featured a criminally insane man, locked in a room in a prison, who reminisces about his disturbing past. Selby described The Room as "the most disturbing book ever written."

Selby continued to write short fiction, as well as screenplays and teleplays at his apartment in West Hollywood. His work was published in various publications, including Black Mountain Review, Evergreen Review, Provincetown Review, Kulchur, New Directions Annual, Yugen, Swank and Open City.

In the 1980s, Selby met punk rock singer Henry Rollins, who had long admired the writer's works and publicly championed them. Rollins helped broaden Selby's readership, and arranged recording sessions and reading tours for Selby. Rollins issued original recordings through his own 2.13.61 publications, and distributed Selby's other works.

For the last 20 years of his life, Selby taught creative writing as an adjunct professor in the Master of Professional Writing program at the University of Southern California.

A film adaptation of Last Exit to Brooklyn, directed by Uli Edel, was made in 1989. Selby made a brief cameo appearance in the film as a taxi driver. Requiem for a Dream (1978) was adapted as a film of the same name released in 2000. He had a small role as a prison guard who taunts Marlon Wayans’s character, who is forced to perform hard labor while going through heroin withdrawal.

== Death and legacy ==
Selby spent the last month of his life in and out of the hospital and died at his home in Highland Park, Los Angeles, on April 26, 2004, of chronic obstructive pulmonary disease. Although he was in pain, he refused morphine on his deathbed.

The New York Times published his obituary the day after his death. In 1999, a French movie director Ludovic Cantais made a documentary about Hubert Selby Jr, "Hubert Selby Jr, a couple of things" broadcast on many European channels. Selby was the subject of the 2005 documentary, Hubert Selby Jr: It/ll Be Better Tomorrow

== In popular culture ==
- In 1972, David Bowie said that two novels influenced him greatly: Jack Kerouac's On the Road and Selby's Last Exit to Brooklyn. He confessed that he had formed a "desperate identification" with the latter novel.
- Selby's first work, "The Queen Is Dead" (appearing as a chapter in Last Exit to Brooklyn), inspired the name of the album by Manchester alternative rock group The Smiths.
- In the book Was This Man a Genius? by Julie Hecht, the comedian Andy Kaufman is quoted saying that his favourite book is The Demon by Hubert Selby (p. 159).
- Last Exit to Brooklyn inspired the name of Sting's first band, Last Exit.
- The Manic Street Preachers song, "Of Walking Abortion", from the album The Holy Bible, begins with a quote from Selby: "I knew that someday I was gonna die. And I knew that before I died, two things would happen to me, that number one: I would regret my entire life; and number two: I would want to live my life over again."
- British band Alt-J composed a song entitled "Fitzpleasure", inspired by the short story "Tralala" from Last Exit to Brooklyn.
- In the Nicolas Winding Refn film Bleeder, a character enters a book store asking for a Hubert Selby Jr. work.
- Nicolas Winding Refn dedicated his film Pusher II to Selby Jr.
- The block of East 10th Street between Second and Third Avenues in Manhattan (where Selby lived in 1964 with his second wife, Judith, and her son, James) is mentioned in Chapter 23 of Tom Robbins's 1976 novel, Even Cowgirls Get the Blues, being described specifically as the place where "Hubert Selby, Jr., wrote Last Exit to Brooklyn."

== Works ==
=== Fiction ===
- Last Exit to Brooklyn (1964)
- The Room (1971)
- The Demon (1976)
- Requiem for a Dream (1978)
- Song of the Silent Snow (1986) (short stories)
- The Willow Tree (1998)
- Waiting Period (2002)

=== Spoken word ===
- Our Fathers Who Aren't in Heaven – Compilation by Henry Rollins. 2xCD set (1990)
- Live in Europe 1989 – Spoken word with Henry Rollins. CD. (1995)
- Blue Eyes and Exit Wounds – Spoken word with Nick Tosches. CD. (1998)

=== Filmography ===
- Jour et Nuit – Screenwriter. France / Switzerland (1986)
- Last Exit to Brooklyn – Writer and actor. United States/Germany (1989)
- Scotch and Milk – Actor (Cubby). United States (1998)
- Requiem for a Dream – Screenwriter and actor. United States (2000)
- Fear X – Screenwriter. Denmark / United Kingdom / Canada (2003)

=== Documentaries ===
- Memories, Dreams & Addictions. Interview with Ellen Burstyn. Special feature on Requiem for a Dream – Director's Cut DVD release. (2001)
- Hubert Selby Jr.: 2 Ou 3 Choses... (A Couple of Things About Hubert Selby Jr.) by Ludovic Cantais, France (2000)
- Hubert Selby Jr: It/ll Be Better Tomorrow (2005)

=== Unfinished and unpublished ===
At least one work-in-progress remained unfinished and unpublished at the time of Selby's death: The Seeds of Pain and the Seeds of Love. Excerpts from this work are heard on the Live in Europe 1989 CD.
