= Emmett Miller =

American minstrel show performer (1900–1962)

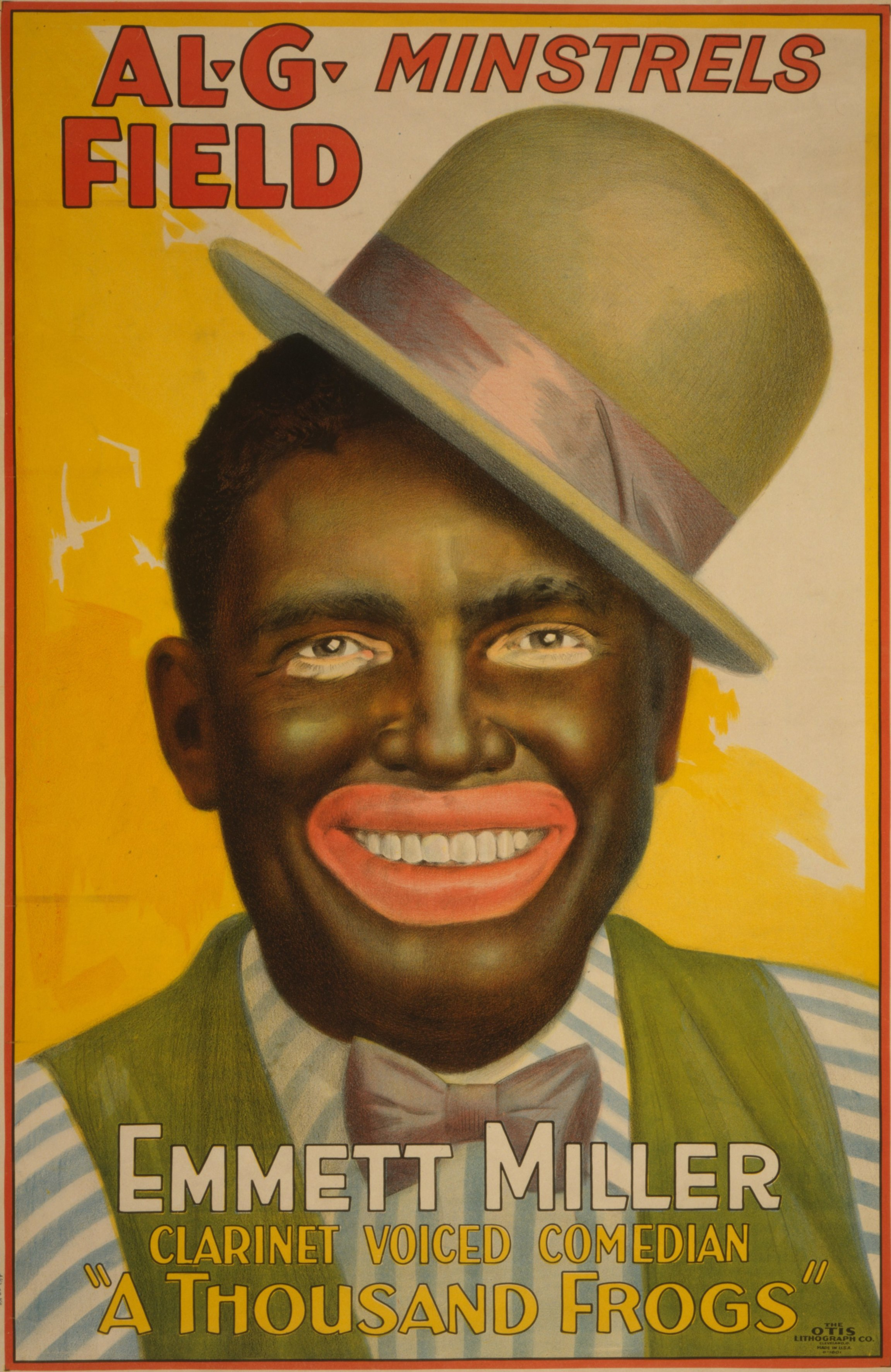
Blackface Emmett Miller in Al G. Field Minstrels

Emmett Miller (February 2, 1900 – March 29, 1962) was an American minstrel show performer and recording artist known for his falsetto, yodel-like voice. Miller was a major influence on many country music singers, including Hank Williams, Jimmie Rodgers, Bob Wills, Milton Brown, Tommy Duncan, and Merle Haggard. His music provides a link among old-time Southern music, minstrelsy, jazz, and Western swing.

== Life ==
Miller was born on February 2, 1900, in Macon, Georgia. His early life is largely undocumented, but it generally is acknowledged that he was performing in minstrel shows by the time he was in his early 20s. His first recordings were released by Okeh Records in 1924. His backup group, the Georgia Crackers, included from 1928-30, the noted jazz musicians Tommy Dorsey, Jimmy Dorsey, Gene Krupa, and Eddie Lang. Miller completed his final recordings for Okeh Records in 1936. Following this he would continue working in Minstrel shows. In 1949 Miller would go on his "Dixieana" tour, with fellow minstrel and associate of Millers named Turk Mcbee. In 1951 on the Dixeana tour he would be scouted by a movie executive and would make an appearance in the 1951 movie "Yes sir, Mr. Bones". Miller continued to perform in minstrel shows until he was well into his 50s, long after they had fallen out of fashion. He returned to Macon, where he died in 1962. He was buried in Fort Hill Cemetery.

== Legacy ==
Miller's influence on early country music is most apparent in Hank Williams's cover of the 1922 Friend–Mills song "Lovesick Blues" and Bob Wills's recording of "I Ain't Got Nobody", both of which closely resemble Miller's versions, and George Strait's Western Swing cover of "Right or Wrong". Merle Haggard, Van Dyke Parks, Ry Cooder, Leon Redbone, Louis Prima, Van Halen and their frontman David Lee Roth have recorded Miller's songs. A compilation, The Minstrel Man from Georgia, was released in 1996.

Emmett Miller: An Obscure Minstrel Yodeler Who Changed Music Forever is a biography by author/filmmaker Jack Norton.

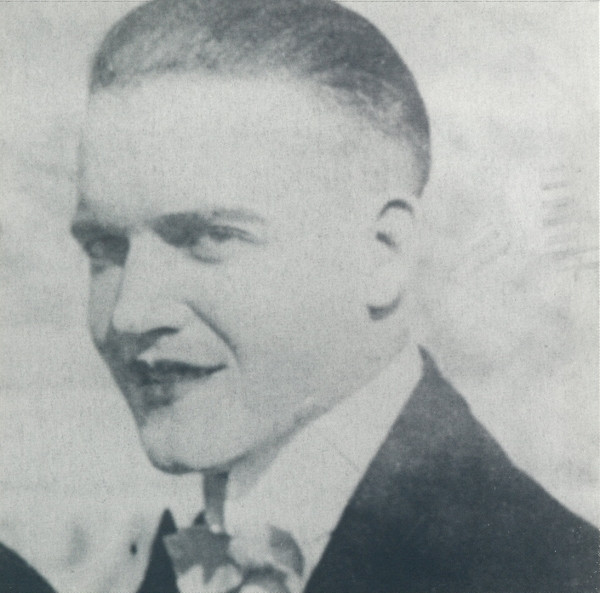
Young Emmett Miller taken sometime in the 1920s.

== Sources ==
- Tosches, Nick (2001). Where Dead Voices Gather. Boston: Little, Brown and Company. ISBN 0-316-89507-5.
- Tosches, Nick (1996). Country: The Twisted Roots of Rock 'n' Roll. New York: Da Capo Press. ISBN 0-306-80713-0.
