= In the Hand of Dante (novel) =

2002 novel by Nick Tosches

- Author: Nick Tosches
- Language: English
- Genre: Novel, Metafiction, Historical fiction
- Publisher: Little, Brown (USA)
- Publication date: September 3, 2002 (USA)
- Publication place: United States
- Media type: Print (Hardback & Paperback)
- Pages: 377 (hardback first edition)
- ISBN: 0-316-89524-5
- Dewey Decimal: 813/.54 21
- LC Class: PS3570.O74 I5 2002

In the Hand of Dante is the third novel by Nick Tosches.

== Plot ==
The book interweaves two separate stories, one set in the 14th century in Italy and Sicily and featuring Dante Alighieri, and another set in the autumn of 2001 and featuring a fictionalized version of Nick Tosches as the protagonist. The historical and modern stories alternate as Dante tries to finish writing his magnum opus and goes on a journey for mystical knowledge in Sicily. Meanwhile, Tosches, as something of a Dante expert, is called in by black market traders to attest to the authenticity of a manuscript of The Divine Comedy supposedly written by Dante himself.

Included in the modern sections of the book are musings by Tosches on the state of modern publishing, the futility of excessively flowery poetry and prose, references to his own previous books (including a lengthy passage directly out of the introduction to The Nick Tosches Reader), the September 11th attacks, and the Rolling Stones.

Louie Brunellesches, a small-time New York gangster who also appears in Tosches' novel Cut Numbers, returns in a smaller role, making this something of a sequel.

== Adaptation ==
Johnny Depp, through his production company Infinitum Nihil, purchased the film rights to the novel in 2008. As of September 2012, it was still a speculative project, though director Julian Schnabel reported that he was working with the actor to develop a screenplay with Depp playing the role of Tosches.

In September 2023, Schnabel revealed that Oscar Isaac was cast in the lead role, replacing Depp.

In October 2023, Jason Momoa and Gerard Butler were added to the cast, with production commencing in Italy that month under a SAG-AFTRA interim agreement.
