= Requiem for a Dream (novel) =

1978 novel by Hubert Selby Jr.

- First edition
- Author: Hubert Selby Jr.
- Language: English
- Genre: Modern tragedy
- Publisher: Playboy Press
- Publication date: 1978
- Publication place: United States
- Media type: Print
- Pages: 288
- ISBN: 0-87223-510-6
- Preceded by: The Demon
- Followed by: The Willow Tree

Requiem for a Dream is a 1978 novel by American writer Hubert Selby Jr. that concerns four New Yorkers whose lives spiral out of control as they succumb to their addictions.

== Plot ==
This story follows the lives of Sara Goldfarb, her son Harry, his girlfriend Marion Kleinmitz, and his best friend Tyrone C. Love, who are all searching for the key to their dreams in their own ways. In the process, they fall into devastating lives of addiction. Harry and Marion are in love and want to open their own business; their friend Tyrone wants to escape life in the ghetto. To achieve these dreams, they buy a large amount of heroin, planning to get rich by selling it.

Sara, Harry's lonely-widowed mother, dreams of being on television. When a phone call from a game show casting company gets her hopes up, she goes to a doctor, who gives her diet pills to lose weight. She spends the next few months on the pills, wanting desperately to look thin on TV and fit into a red dress from her younger days. However, the company never calls her back. She becomes addicted to the pills, develops amphetamine psychosis, and is ultimately committed against her will to a psychiatric institution, where she is last seen being forced to undergo electroconvulsive therapy (ECT).

Harry, Marion, and Tyrone are unable to find a buyer for the heroin and start using it instead. Eventually, when the supply runs out, they become paranoid, hiding the drugs they obtain from the others. Harry and Tyrone flee to Miami but are pulled over and arrested when drugs are found in their car. Harry's arm has become infected from repeat injections and has to be amputated; with his mother now out of his life, Harry has no one left to care for him. Tyrone is abused by several racist corrections officers and has to do backbreaking physical labor while going through withdrawal. Back in New York, Marion is now a heroin-addicted prostitute.

== Film adaptation ==
The novel was adapted into a film, released in 2000. The film was directed by Darren Aronofsky and stars Jared Leto, Jennifer Connelly, Marlon Wayans and Ellen Burstyn. Burstyn was nominated for the Academy Award for Best Actress for her performance as Sara.

== Release details ==
The only publicly available uncorrected proof copy, published in 1978 by Playboy Press, was put on sale by The Rarest Works in 2024.

- Paperback – ISBN 978-1-56025-248-1, published in 2000 by Da Capo Press.
