= Requiem for a Dream =

2000 film by Darren Aronofsky

- Theatrical release poster
- Directed by: Darren Aronofsky
- Screenplay by: Hubert Selby Jr.; Darren Aronofsky
- Based on: Requiem for a Dream by Hubert Selby Jr.
- Produced by: Eric Watson; Palmer West
- Starring: Ellen Burstyn; Jared Leto; Jennifer Connelly; Marlon Wayans
- Cinematography: Matthew Libatique
- Edited by: Jay Rabinowitz
- Music by: Clint Mansell
- Production companies: Thousand Words; Protozoa Pictures
- Distributed by: Artisan Entertainment (United States); Summit Entertainment (International)
- Release dates: May 14, 2000 (Cannes); October 6, 2000 (United States)
- Running time: 102 minutes
- Country: United States
- Language: English
- Budget: $4.5 million
- Box office: $7.4 million

Requiem for a Dream is a 2000 American psychological drama film directed by Darren Aronofsky and written by Aronofsky and Hubert Selby Jr., based on Selby's 1978 novel. It stars Ellen Burstyn, Jared Leto, Jennifer Connelly, Christopher McDonald and Marlon Wayans. The film depicts four characters affected by drug addiction and how it alters their physical and emotional states. Their addictions cause them to become imprisoned in a world of delusion and desperation. As the film progresses, each character deteriorates, and their delusions are shattered by the harsh reality of their situations, resulting in catastrophe.

Selby's novel was optioned by Aronofsky and producer Eric Watson. Selby had always intended to adapt the novel into a film, and he had written a script years prior. Aronofsky was enthusiastic about the story and developed the script with Selby, despite struggles to obtain funding. He and the cast said the film was about addiction in general, and not just drugs, and how chasing a dream can fuel an addiction with a theme of loneliness and avoidance of reality in different ways. Principal photography took place in Brooklyn, New York, from April to June 1999. The music was composed by Clint Mansell and Jay Rabinowitz was the editor.

Requiem for a Dream premiered at the 2000 Cannes Film Festival, selected as an out-of-competition entry, followed by the United States theatrical release on October 6, 2000, by Artisan Entertainment. It grossed $7 million on a $4 million budget and received positive reviews. Burstyn was nominated for a Golden Globe Award and the Academy Award for Best Actress.

== Plot ==
Sara Goldfarb, a widow living alone in Brighton Beach, New York City, watches television. Her son Harry and his friend Tyrone are heroin addicts. The two deal heroin in a bid to realize their dreams; Harry and his girlfriend Marion plan to open a clothing store for Marion's designs, while Tyrone seeks the approval of his mother and an escape from the ghetto. When Sara receives an invitation to appear on her favorite game show, she begins a restrictive crash diet, hoping to fit into a red dress that she wore at Harry's graduation.

At the advice of her friend Rae, Sara visits a physician who prescribes her amphetamines to control her appetite. She begins losing weight rapidly and is excited by how much energy she has. When Harry recognizes the signs of her drug abuse and implores her to stop taking the amphetamines, Sara insists that the chance to appear on television and the increased admiration from her friends Ada and Rae are her remaining reasons to live. As time passes, Sara becomes frantic waiting for the invitation and increases her dosage, which causes her to develop amphetamine psychosis.

Tyrone is caught in a shootout between drug traffickers and the Sicilian Mafia and is arrested despite his innocence. Harry has to use most of their saved money to post bail. As a result of the gang warfare, the local supply of heroin becomes restricted, and they are unable to find any to buy. Eventually, Tyrone hears of a large shipment coming to New York from Florida, but the price has doubled and the minimum purchase risk is high. Harry encourages Marion to engage in prostitution, particularly with her psychiatrist, Arnold, as a client. This request, along with their mounting withdrawal symptoms, strains their relationship.

Sara's increased dosage of amphetamines distorts her sense of reality, and she begins to hallucinate that she is mocked by the host and crowd from the television show, and attacked by her refrigerator. Sara flees her apartment and goes to the casting agency office in Manhattan to confirm when she will be on television. Sara's disturbed state causes her to be admitted to a psychiatric ward, where she undergoes electroconvulsive therapy after failing to respond to various medications. After the heroin shipment descends into a melee, Harry and Tyrone travel to Miami to buy heroin directly from the wholesaler. However, Harry's arm has become gangrenous from heroin use, so the two stop at a hospital. The doctor realizes that Harry is a drug addict and calls the police, resulting in Harry and Tyrone being arrested.

Back in New York City, a desperate Marion begins to work for a pimp, Big Tim, and participates in group sex for drugs. Sara's treatment leaves her in a catatonic state of dissociation, to the horror of Ada and Rae, who weep and try to comfort each other on a bench outside the hospital. Harry's arm is amputated above the elbow, and he breaks down in tears as he realizes Marion will not visit him (despite a gentle nurse trying to reassure him that she will come). Tyrone is subjected to grueling labor and psychological abuse from the racist prison guards, all while experiencing a painful heroin withdrawal. Marion returns home and lies on her sofa, clutching her score, and is surrounded by her crumpled and discarded clothing designs. Each of the four curls into a fetal position, ending with Sara, who imagines herself as the game show winner, with an engaged and successful Harry arriving as a guest and embracing her.

== Cast ==
- Ellen Burstyn as Sara Goldfarb
- Jared Leto as Harry Goldfarb
- Jennifer Connelly as Marion Silver
- Marlon Wayans as Tyrone C. Love
- Christopher McDonald as Tappy Tibbons
- Mark Margolis as Mr. Rabinowitz
- Louise Lasser as Ada
- Marcia Jean Kurtz as Rae
- Suzanne Shepherd as Mrs. Scarlini
- Sean Gullette as Arnold, Marion's psychiatrist
- Keith David as Big Tim, Marion's pimp
- Dylan Baker as Southern Doctor
- Ajay Naidu as Mailman
- Denise Dowse as Tyrone's mother
- Ben Shenkman as Dr. Spencer
- Hubert Selby Jr. as Laughing Guard
- Stanley B. Herman as Uncle Hank
- Darren Aronofsky (uncredited) as visitor

== Production ==
=== Development ===
Requiem for a Dream is not about heroin or about drugs... The Harry-Tyrone-Marion story is a very traditional heroin story. But putting it side by side with the Sara story, we suddenly say, 'Oh, my God, what is a drug?' The idea that the same inner monologue goes through a person's head when they're trying to quit drugs, as with cigarettes, as when they're trying to not eat food so they can lose 20 pounds, was really fascinating to me. I thought it was an idea that we hadn't seen on film and I wanted to bring it up on the screen.

— Aronofsky on Requiem for a Dream

The novel Requiem for a Dream by Hubert Selby Jr. was published in 1978. Aronofsky had been a fan of Selby's work during his school years. In a 2001 interview with the BBC, Aronofsky described Selby's work, saying, "Anyone that reads Selby's work can see how intense his world is. He writes the most discordant, angry words that tickle the air with some sweet music around it. It's an unbelievable experience to read his books. I knew that once I made a larger film it would be very difficult to do a project like this. I live my life not wanting to have any regrets, and I knew that Selby was cool, that he's a badass".

Eric Watson, producer and co-writer of Pi (1998), convinced Aronofsky to adapt the novel into a film. Selby was open to the idea and granted permission. Aronofsky and Watson optioned the film rights for $1,000, considered a large sum for them at the time. Aronofsky was still struggling financially after Pi, and financiers were also unconvinced on his idea of Requiem for a Dream. A screenplay had been written by Selby years prior, which was 80% similar to Aronofsky's. The pair compared their works, but Aronofsky wanted to cast younger characters to enhance the impact of drugs. However, the producers were against hiring a younger cast as they felt the film would be too unsettling for audiences; Aronofsky reluctantly agreed.

=== Casting ===
A number of actresses were considered for the role of Sara Goldfarb, but many of them, such as Faye Dunaway rejected the part. Ellen Burstyn also initially rejected the part due to the depressing content, but her manager convinced her to see Aronofsky's previous work; she was impressed and agreed to be cast in the lead role. Giovanni Ribisi, Neve Campbell and Dave Chappelle were considered for the roles of Harry Goldfarb, Marion Silver and Tyrone C. Love, respectively. All three declined. The producers settled with Jared Leto, who was interested in the challenge, followed by Jennifer Connelly. "When I read the script, it was really something I wanted to do. I thought the script was brilliant. It was so creative. I thought it was really brave. It was talking about really important issues," she said. Marlon Wayans read the novel three times and auditioned five times for the role of Tyrone before he was offered the part, eager to work with Aronofsky.

In preparation for filming, Leto spent time living on the streets of New York, surrounded by people who were in the same situation as his character. He also starved himself for months, losing 28 pounds (13 kg) to play his heroin-addicted character realistically. Aronofsky requested that Leto and Wayans refrain from having sex and consuming sugar so that their cravings would appear genuine on-screen. Burstyn also spent time in Brooklyn, learning about the lives of particular women, and how narrow they were. "Their life is about getting enough money to put food on the table to feed their children, and that's it", she said. Connelly prepared for the role by renting an apartment in the building where the character lived. Connelly isolated herself, painted, listened to music that she thought Marion would, designed clothes, and used the time to reflect about addictions and their origin. She also talked to addicts and attended Narcotics Anonymous meetings with a recovering friend.

=== Filming ===
Filming lasted 40 days from 19 April to 16 June 1999, on location in and around Coney Island, including the boardwalk, amusement parks and Brighton Beach. To capture Sara Goldfarb's weight loss throughout the film, Burstyn wore two fat suits; one simulated an additional 40 pounds (18 kg) in weight and one 20 pounds (9.1 kg). Burstyn also dieted during a two-week break in the filming schedule, allowing her to lose 10 pounds (4.5 kg). Makeup artists designed nine wigs and four necks for her, with some of the prosthetic pieces taking up to four hours to apply. Connelly's wardrobe consisted of pieces that she had made during her time preparing for the role.

During a grocery store scene, real drug addicts were brought in as extras. Aronofsky has recalled that some were injecting themselves during filming. One bathtub scene was inspired by Satoshi Kon's 1997 anime film Perfect Blue. Post-production also included approximately 150 special effects, created by Amoeba Proteus, a digital effects company formed by Aronofsky and his friends. After filming was completed, Burstyn said, "I don't think I've ever been this challenged in a role—it was harder than The Exorcist". Connelly also spoke of how "it was hard, really hard to go through, emotionally. It was draining, sad, and uncomfortable".

=== Editing ===
Rapid cuts in Requiem for a Dream (0:20)
One of the visual techniques is the use of rapid cuts or a hip hop montage. Whenever the characters use street drugs, a rapid succession of images illustrates their transition from sobriety to intoxication. In this scene, Harry and Tyrone deal drugs and Marion uses cocaine while she designs clothes. The speed of the footage and the cuts alternate as the characters become intoxicated and sober.

As with Aronofsky's previous film, Pi, montages of extremely short shots were used throughout the film; such techniques are sometimes referred to as hip hop montage but are also employed in traditional cinema, such as Man with a Movie Camera. While an average 100-minute film has 600 to 700 cuts, Requiem for a Dream features more than 2,000. Split-screen is used extensively, along with extremely tight close-ups. Long tracking shots, including shots where the camera is strapped to an actor and facing them, known as Snorricam, and time-lapse photography are also prominent stylistic devices.

Aronofsky alternates between extreme close-ups and extreme distance from the action, with sharp cuts between reality and characters' fantasies. The camerawork forces the viewer to explore the characters' states of mind, hallucinations, visual distortions, and inaccurate sense of time. The average length of scenes also shortens as the film progresses, from around 90 seconds to 2 minutes in the beginning, until the climactic scenes, which are cut very rapidly accompanied by incidental music. After the climax, there is a short period of silence and serenity. Pixelation and a fisheye lens are also techniques used to help reinforce the effect of drugs and the viewer's distance from the character.

=== Music ===
The soundtrack was composed by Clint Mansell. The string quartet arrangements were written by David Lang and performed by the Kronos Quartet. The soundtrack was re-released with the album Requiem for a Dream: Remixed, which contains remixes of the music by various artists including Paul Oakenfold, Josh Wink, Jagz Kooner, and Delerium. The track "Lux Aeterna" is an orchestral composition by Mansell, the leitmotif of Requiem for a Dream, and the penultimate piece in the film's soundtrack. The popularity of this piece led to its use in popular culture outside the film, in film and teaser trailers, and with multiple remixes and remakes by other producers.

== Reception ==
=== Box office ===
Requiem for a Dream premiered at the 2000 Cannes Film Festival on May 14, 2000, and the 2000 Toronto International Film Festival on September 13 before a wide release a month later. In the United States, the film opened on October 6, 2000, and grossed a total of $3,635,482, averaging $64,770 per theater. In other territories, the film earned $3,754,626, bringing a worldwide total of $7,390,108.

=== Rating ===
In the United States, the film was originally rated NC-17 by the Motion Picture Association of America, but Aronofsky appealed the rating, claiming that cutting any portion of the film would dilute its message. The appeal was denied, and Artisan Entertainment decided to release the film unrated. An R-rated version was released on video, with the sex scene edited, but the rest of the film identical to the unrated version.

In the United Kingdom, the film is rated 18 by the British Board of Film Classification.

=== Critical response ===
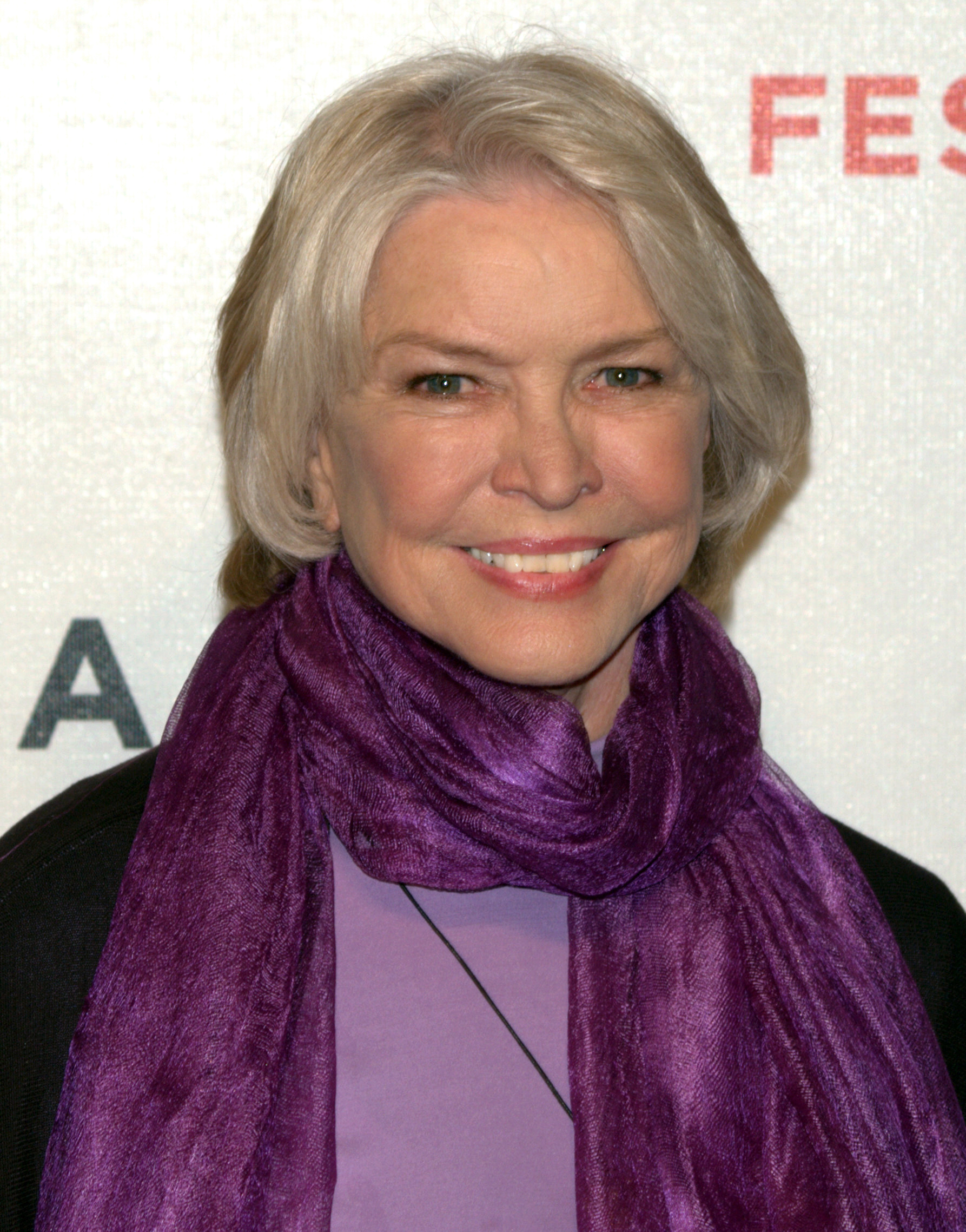
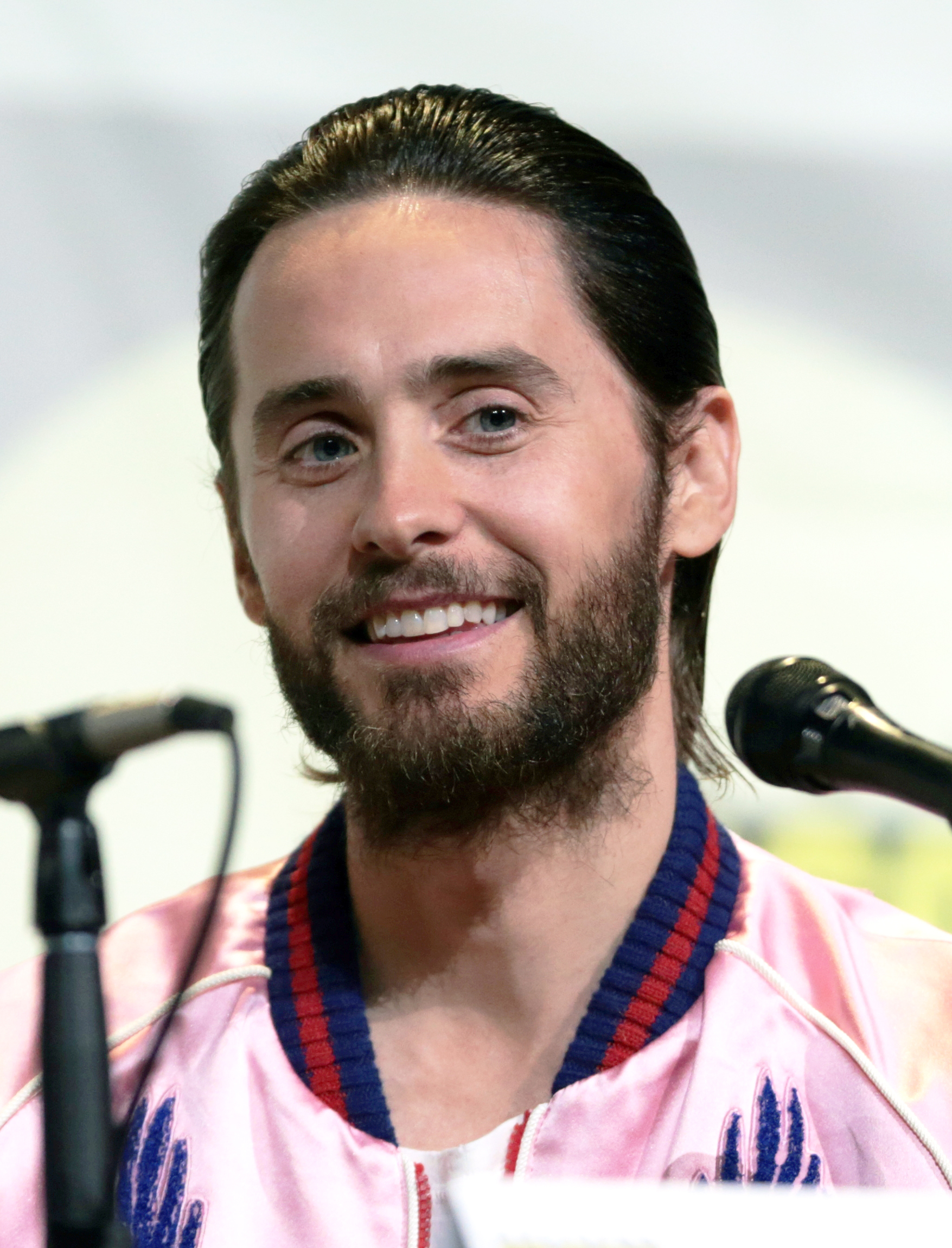
Burstyn and Leto received acclaim, with Burstyn earning a nomination for the Academy Award for Best Actress.

On Rotten Tomatoes, Requiem for a Dream is rated 79% based on 180 reviews, with an average score of 7.40/10. The consensus: "Though the film may be too intense for some to stomach, the wonderful performances and the bleak imagery are hard to forget." On Metacritic the film has a weighted average score of 71 out of 100 based on 32 critics, indicating "generally favorable reviews".

Film critic James Berardinelli ranked it the second-best film of the decade, behind The Lord of the Rings. Roger Ebert gave it 3½ out of 4, praising "how well [Aronofsky] portrays the mental states of his addicts...a window opens briefly into a world where everything is right. Then it slides shut." Elvis Mitchell of The New York Times liked the illustration of how the characters' "lives are so empty when they're not consuming."

Peter Bradshaw of The Guardian thought the film was both "formally pleasing" with an "unflinchingly grim portrait of drug abuse." Peter Travers of Rolling Stone wrote that its editing and distorted images "assault the senses." Owen Gleiberman of Entertainment Weekly, graded it "A": "hypnotically harrowing and intense, a visual and spiritual plunge into seduction and terror." He thought it "may be the first movie to fully capture the way drugs dislocate us." Scott Brake of IGN wrote the film was "addictive" and "relentless", praising the "bravura cinematic techniques (split screens, complex cross-cutting schemes, hallucinatory visuals) to Clint Mansell's driving, hypnotic score (performed by the Kronos Quartet)."

Some critics were less positive. Dessen Howe of The Washington Post did not think the film's style could "augment this one-note symphony of doom." David Sterritt of the Christian Science Monitor thought "the filmmaking gets addicted to its own flashy cynicism...seems as dazed and confused as the situations it wants to criticize." William Arnold of Seattle Post-Intelligencer wrote "Aronofsky hurls the full grammar of the cinema at us like a film student on an adrenaline rush: slow-motion, fast-forward, jump cuts, surreal fantasy sequences, endless glaring close-ups of dilating pupils, bizarre hand-held tracking shots." He admired the stylization, yet thought the editing was "brutalizing and counterproductive".

Some critics characterized Requiem for a Dream in the genre of "drug movies", with films like The Basketball Diaries, Trainspotting, Spun, and Fear and Loathing in Las Vegas.

=== Accolades ===
Award	Category	Recipient(s)	Result
Academy Awards	Best Actress	Ellen Burstyn	Nominated
American Film Institute Awards	Movie of the Year		Won
Austin Film Critics Association Awards	Top 10 Films of the Decade		5th Place
Awards Circuit Community Awards (2000)	Best Motion Picture	Eric Watson and Palmer West	Won
Awards Circuit Community Awards (2000)	Best Director	Darren Aronofsky	Won
Awards Circuit Community Awards (2000)	Best Actress in a Leading Role	Ellen Burstyn	Won
Awards Circuit Community Awards (2000)	Best Actress in a Supporting Role	Jennifer Connelly	Runner-up
Awards Circuit Community Awards (2000)	Best Adapted Screenplay	Hubert Selby Jr. and Darren Aronofsky	Runner-up
Awards Circuit Community Awards (2000)	Best Cinematography	Matthew Libatique	Runner-up
Awards Circuit Community Awards (2000)	Best Film Editing	Jay Rabinowitz	Won
Awards Circuit Community Awards (2000)	Best Original Score	Clint Mansell	Won
Awards Circuit Community Awards (2000)	Best Sound Editing		Runner-up
Awards Circuit Community Awards (2000)	Best Sound Mixing		Runner-up
Awards Circuit Community Awards (2000)	Best Cast Ensemble	Jared Leto, Ellen Burstyn, Jennifer Connelly, Marlon Wayans	Runner-up
Awards Circuit Community Awards (2012)	Best Original Score of the Decade	Clint Mansell	Won
Black Reel Awards	Outstanding Supporting Actor	Marlon Wayans	Nominated
Black Reel Awards	Outstanding Film Poster		Nominated
Boston Society of Film Critics Awards	Best Actress	Ellen Burstyn	Won
Boston Society of Film Critics Awards	Best Cinematography	Matthew Libatique	3rd Place
Bram Stoker Awards	Best Screenplay	Hubert Selby Jr. and Darren Aronofsky	Nominated
Chicago Film Critics Association Awards	Best Director	Darren Aronofsky	Nominated
Chicago Film Critics Association Awards	Best Actress	Ellen Burstyn	Won
Chlotrudis Awards	Best Movie		Won
Chlotrudis Awards	Best Director	Darren Aronofsky	Nominated
Chlotrudis Awards	Best Actress	Ellen Burstyn	Nominated
Chlotrudis Awards	Best Supporting Actor	Marlon Wayans	Nominated
Chlotrudis Awards	Best Supporting Actress	Jennifer Connelly	Nominated
Chlotrudis Awards	Best Adapted Screenplay	Hubert Selby Jr. and Darren Aronofsky	Nominated
Chlotrudis Awards	Best Cinematography	Matthew Libatique	Nominated
Chlotrudis Awards	Best Cast	Jared Leto, Ellen Burstyn, Jennifer Connelly, Marlon Wayans	Nominated
Dallas–Fort Worth Film Critics Association Awards	Best Actress	Ellen Burstyn	Nominated
Fangoria Chainsaw Awards	Best Limited-Release/Direct-to-Video Film		Nominated
Fangoria Chainsaw Awards	Best Actress	Ellen Burstyn	Won
Fangoria Chainsaw Awards	Best Supporting Actor	Marlon Wayans	Nominated
Fangoria Chainsaw Awards	Best Supporting Actress	Jennifer Connelly	Nominated
Fangoria Chainsaw Awards	Best Screenplay	Hubert Selby Jr. and Darren Aronofsky	Nominated
Fangoria Chainsaw Awards	Best Score	Clint Mansell	Nominated
Fangoria Chainsaw Awards	Best Makeup/Creature FX	Vincent J. Guastini	Nominated
Florida Film Critics Circle Awards	Best Actress	Ellen Burstyn	Won
Golden Globe Awards	Best Actress in a Motion Picture – Drama	Ellen Burstyn	Nominated
Golden Reel Awards	Best Sound Editing – Foreign Feature	Nelson Ferreira, Craig Henighan, Stephen Barden and Jill Purdy	Nominated
Golden Trailer Awards	Best of Show		Won
Golden Trailer Awards	Best Art and Commerce		Nominated
Golden Trailer Awards	Best Music		Nominated
Golden Trailer Awards	Most Original		Nominated
Independent Spirit Awards	Best Feature		Nominated
Independent Spirit Awards	Best Director	Darren Aronofsky	Nominated
Independent Spirit Awards	Best Female Lead	Ellen Burstyn	Won
Independent Spirit Awards	Best Supporting Female	Jennifer Connelly	Nominated
Independent Spirit Awards	Best Cinematography	Matthew Libatique	Won
International Horror Guild Awards	Best Movie		Nominated
Kansas City Film Critics Circle Awards	Best Actress	Ellen Burstyn	Won
Las Vegas Film Critics Society Awards	Best Actress	Ellen Burstyn	Won
Las Vegas Film Critics Society Awards	Best Supporting Actress	Jennifer Connelly	Nominated
Make-Up Artists and Hair Stylists Guild Awards	Best Innovative Hair Styling – Feature		Nominated
National Board of Review Awards	Special Recognition for Excellence in Filmmaking		Won
National Society of Film Critics Awards	Best Actress	Ellen Burstyn	3rd Place
New York Film Critics Circle Awards	Best Supporting Actress	Ellen Burstyn	Runner-up
New York Film Critics Circle Awards	Best Actor	Jared Leto	Nominated
Online Film & Television Association Awards (2000)	Best Picture	Eric Watson and Palmer West	Nominated
Online Film & Television Association Awards (2000)	Best Director	Darren Aronofsky	Nominated
Online Film & Television Association Awards (2000)	Best Actress	Ellen Burstyn	Won
Online Film & Television Association Awards (2000)	Best Screenplay – Based on Material from Another Medium	Hubert Selby Jr. and Darren Aronofsky	Nominated
Online Film & Television Association Awards (2000)	Best Cinematography	Matthew Libatique	Nominated
Online Film & Television Association Awards (2000)	Best Film Editing	Jay Rabinowitz	Won
Online Film & Television Association Awards (2000)	Best Original Score	Clint Mansell	Nominated
Online Film & Television Association Awards (2000)	Best Cinematic Moment	"Finale"	Nominated
Online Film & Television Association Awards (2000)	Best Cinematic Moment	"Shoot-Up Sequences"	Nominated
Online Film & Television Association Awards (2000)	Best Ensemble	Jared Leto, Ellen Burstyn, Jennifer Connelly, Marlon Wayans	Nominated
Online Film & Television Association Awards (2000)	Best Makeup		Nominated
Online Film & Television Association Awards (2000)	Best Sound Effects		Nominated
Online Film & Television Association Awards (2000)	Best Official Film Website		Won
Online Film & Television Association Awards (2021)	Hall of Fame – Scores		Won
Online Film Critics Society Awards	Top 10 Films		2nd Place
Online Film Critics Society Awards	Best Picture		Nominated
Online Film Critics Society Awards	Best Director	Darren Aronofsky	Won
Online Film Critics Society Awards	Best Actress	Ellen Burstyn	Won
Online Film Critics Society Awards	Best Supporting Actress	Jennifer Connelly	Nominated
Online Film Critics Society Awards	Best Cinematography	Matthew Libatique	Nominated
Online Film Critics Society Awards	Best Editing	Jay Rabinowitz	Won
Online Film Critics Society Awards	Best Original Score	Clint Mansell	Won
Online Film Critics Society Awards	Best Ensemble	Jared Leto, Ellen Burstyn, Jennifer Connelly, Marlon Wayans	Nominated
Phoenix Film Critics Society Awards	Best Picture		Nominated
Phoenix Film Critics Society Awards	Best Director	Darren Aronofsky	Nominated
Phoenix Film Critics Society Awards	Best Actress in a Leading Role	Ellen Burstyn	Won
Phoenix Film Critics Society Awards	Best Actress in a Supporting Role	Jennifer Connelly	Nominated
Phoenix Film Critics Society Awards	Best Screenplay – Adaptation	Hubert Selby Jr. and Darren Aronofsky	Nominated
Phoenix Film Critics Society Awards	Best Cinematography	Matthew Libatique	Nominated
Phoenix Film Critics Society Awards	Best Film Editing	Jay Rabinowitz	Won
Russian Guild of Film Critics Awards	Best Foreign Actress	Ellen Burstyn	Nominated
São Paulo International Film Festival	Best Feature Film	Darren Aronofsky	Nominated
Satellite Awards	Best Actress in a Motion Picture – Drama	Ellen Burstyn	Won
Saturn Awards	Best Horror Film		Nominated
Saturn Awards	Best Actress	Ellen Burstyn	Nominated
Screen Actors Guild Awards	Outstanding Performance by a Female Actor in a Leading Role	Ellen Burstyn	Nominated
SESC Film Festival	Best Foreign Actress (Critics Award)	Ellen Burstyn	Nominated
SESC Film Festival	Best Foreign Actress (Audience Award)	Ellen Burstyn	Won (Note: Tied with Maggie Cheung for In the Mood for Love.)
Southeastern Film Critics Association Awards	Best Picture		6th Place
Southeastern Film Critics Association Awards	Best Director	Darren Aronofsky	Runner-up
Southeastern Film Critics Association Awards	Best Actress	Ellen Burstyn	Won
Stockholm International Film Festival	Bronze Horse	Darren Aronofsky	Nominated
Stockholm International Film Festival	Best Actress	Ellen Burstyn	Won
Toronto Film Critics Association Awards	Best Supporting Actress	Ellen Burstyn	Runner-up
Valladolid International Film Festival	Golden Spike	Darren Aronofsky	Won (Note: Tied with The Town Is Quiet.)
Vancouver Film Critics Circle Awards	Best Actress	Ellen Burstyn	Nominated
Webby Awards	Websites – Movie & Film		Won

- In 2007, Requiem for a Dream was listed on the ballot for the American Film Institute's list of AFI's 100 Years...100 Movies (10th Anniversary Edition).
- In a 2016 international critics' poll conducted by the BBC, Requiem for a Dream was tied with Toni Erdmann (2016) and Carlos (2010) at 100th place in a list of the 100 greatest motion pictures since 2000.
- The film was listed as the 29th best-edited film of all time in a 2012 survey by members of the Motion Picture Editors Guild.
- In 2025, it was one of the films voted for the "Readers' Choice" edition of The New York Times' list of "The 100 Best Movies of the 21st Century," finishing at number 116.
