= Soul Asylum discography =

Band discography

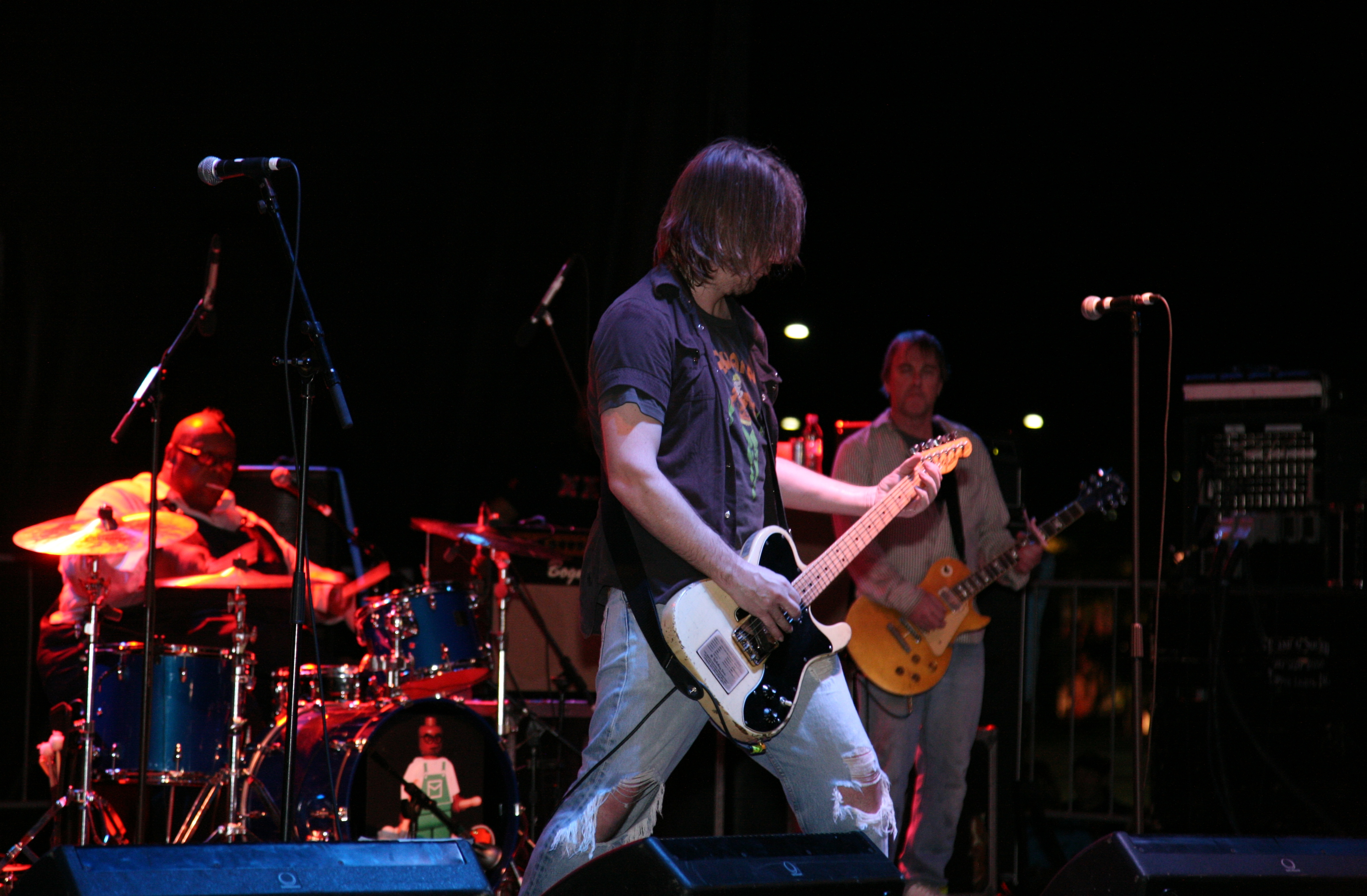
- Soul Asylum performing at a 2010 concert in Urbana, Illinois. From left to right: Michael Bland (drums), Dave Pirner (vocals, rhythm guitar), and Dan Murphy (lead guitar).
- Studio albums: 13
- Extended plays: 2
- Live albums: 2
- Compilation albums: 5
- Singles: 22
- Music videos: 17
- Other appearances: 15

The discography of American alternative rock band Soul Asylum consists of 13 studio albums, two live albums, five compilation albums, two extended plays (EPs), 22 singles, and 17 music videos. Formed in 1981 in Minneapolis, Minnesota using the name Loud Fast Rules, the band's original lineup consisted of vocalist Dave Pirner, guitarist Dan Murphy, bassist Karl Mueller, and drummer Pat Morley. The band changed their name to Soul Asylum prior to the release of Say What You Will... Everything Can Happen in 1984. Later that year, Morley was replaced on drums by Grant Young.

The band released two studio albums for Twin/Tone Records in 1986, Made to Be Broken and While You Were Out, as well as the cassette-only Time's Incinerator, a collection of B-sides, outtakes, and demos. Having a loyal and growing fan base, along with positive reviews from alternative rock critics, Soul Asylum signed with A&M Records in 1988. They recorded the Clam Dip & Other Delights EP for European release, followed by the full-length Hang Time in 1988. Produced by Lenny Kaye and Ed Stasium, Hang Time was well-received on college radio but the follow-up album, And the Horse They Rode in On (1990), was a critical and commercial disappointment, resulting in the band being dropped by A&M.

Soul Asylum signed with Columbia Records and released Grave Dancers Union in 1992. The album's first single, "Somebody to Shove", went to number one on the Modern Rock chart, and "Black Gold" also received significant airplay on radio and MTV. "Runaway Train" crossed over to the pop charts, peaking at number five on the Billboard Hot 100 in 1993 and winning the Grammy Award for Best Rock Song. The song's music video, directed by Tony Kaye, features photos of missing children and was adapted for several international markets. "Runaway Train" peaked at number one in Canada and reached the top 10 in the Netherlands, Germany, New Zealand, Sweden, Switzerland, and the United Kingdom. The song's success helped Grave Dancers Union achieve double-platinum certification by Music Canada and by the Recording Industry Association of America (RIAA) in the United States.

The band's seventh album, Let Your Dim Light Shine (1995), peaked at number six in the US and in Canada. It was certified double-platinum in Canada and platinum in the US. Lead single "Misery" charted at number three in Canada and was a top 30 hit in the US, Australia, New Zealand, and the UK. In September 1995, Soul Asylum performed at a concert commemorating the Rock and Roll Hall of Fame opening in Cleveland, Ohio. A two-disc compilation of the event released the following year features the band's performances of "Back Door Man" with Iggy Pop and "Sweet Jane" with Lou Reed. Soul Asylum's next studio album, Candy from a Stranger (1998), charted in the US and Canada but it sold fewer copies and received less favorable reviews than its predecessors. After taking a break, the band began recording a new album in 2004. However, sessions were put on hold when bassist Karl Mueller was diagnosed with throat cancer; he died the following year. Guest musicians—including bassist Tommy Stinson, who later joined the group as a permanent member—were brought in to complete the album The Silver Lining (2006). The band's next album, Delayed Reaction (2012), received positive reviews and it entered the US album charts, but founding member Dan Murphy left the group at the end of the year. Soul Asylum released their eleventh album, Change of Fortune, in 2016 and their twelfth album, Hurry Up and Wait, in 2020. Their latest, Slowly but Shirley, was released in 2024.

== Albums ==
=== Studio albums ===
List of studio albums, with selected chart positions and certifications
Title	Album details	Peak chart positions										Certifications
Title	Album details	US	AUS	AUT	CAN	GER	NL	NZ	SWE	SWI	UK	Certifications
Say What You Will...	Released: August 24, 1984; Label: Twin/Tone; Format: CS, CD, LP	—	—	—	—	—	—	—	—	—	—	
Made to Be Broken	Released: January 18, 1986; Label: Twin/Tone; Format: CS, CD, LP	—	—	—	—	—	—	—	—	—	—	
While You Were Out	Released: November 25, 1986; Label: Twin/Tone; Format: CS, CD, LP	—	—	—	—	—	—	—	—	—	—	
Hang Time	Released: April 25, 1988; Label: A&M; Format: CS, CD, LP	—	—	—	—	—	—	—	—	—	—	
And the Horse They Rode In On	Released: September 4, 1990; Label: A&M; Format: CS, CD, LP	—	—	—	—	—	—	—	—	—	—	
Grave Dancers Union	Released: October 6, 1992; Label: Columbia; Format: CS, CD, LP	11	63	2	10	8	30	7	12	4	27	BPI: Gold; BVMI: Gold; IFPI AUT: Gold; IFPI SWI: Gold; MC: 2× Platinum; RIAA: 2× Platinum
Let Your Dim Light Shine	Released: June 6, 1995; Label: Columbia; Format: CS, CD, LP	6	27	21	4	32	73	8	37	23	22	MC: 2× Platinum; RIAA: Platinum
Candy from a Stranger	Released: May 12, 1998; Label: Columbia; Format: CS, CD, LP	121	—	—	58	—	—	—	—	—	—	
The Silver Lining	Released: July 11, 2006; Label: Legacy; Format: CD	155	—	—	—	—	—	—	—	—	—	
Delayed Reaction	Released: July 17, 2012; Label: 429; Format: CD, LP	160	—	—	—	—	—	—	—	—	—	
Change of Fortune	Released: March 18, 2016; Label: Entertainment One; Format: CD, LP	—	—	—	—	—	—	—	—	—	—	
Hurry Up and Wait	Released: April 17, 2020; Label: Blue Élan Records; Format: CD, LP, CS	—	—	—	—	—	—	—	—	—	—	
Slowly But Shirley	Released: September 27, 2024; Label: Blue Élan Records; Format: CD, LP	—	—	—	—	—	—	—	—	—	—	
"—" denotes a recording that did not chart or was not released in that territory.

=== Live albums ===
List of live albums
Title	Album details	Peak chart positions
Title	Album details	AUT
Insomniac's Dream	Released: August 19, 1994; Label: Columbia; Format: CD	39
After the Flood: Live from the Grand Forks Prom, June 28, 1997	Released: October 5, 2004; Labels: Columbia/Legacy; Format: CD	—
Extended Versions	Released: 2010; Labels: Sony Music; Format: CD; Recorded at Aragon Ballroom, Chicago, IL - August 25, 1995	—
The Complete Unplugged NYC '93	Released: 2023; Labels: Columbia/Legacy; Format: Vinyl; Recorded live in New York City on MTV Unplugged, April 20, 1993	—

=== Compilation albums ===
List of compilation albums
Title	Album details
Time's Incinerator	Released: June 24, 1986; Label: Twin/Tone; Format: CS
Black Gold: The Best of Soul Asylum	Released: September 26, 2000; Labels: Columbia/Legacy; Format: CD
Closer to the Stars: Best of the Twin/Tone Years	Released: April 4, 2006; Label: Rykodisc; Format: CD
Welcome to the Minority – The A&M Years 1988–1991	Released: September 25, 2007; Label: Hip-O; Format: 3xCD
Playlist: The Very Best of Soul Asylum	Released: January 25, 2011; Labels: Columbia/Legacy; Format: CD

== Extended plays ==
List of extended plays
Title	Album details
Clam Dip & Other Delights	Released: April 14, 1989; Label: Twin/Tone; Format: CS, CD, LP
No Fun Intended	Released: July 16, 2013; Label: 429; Format: Digital download
Born Free	Released: October 16, 2020; Label: Blue Élan Records; Format: Digital download

== Singles ==
List of singles, with selected chart positions and certifications, showing year released and album name
Title	Year	Peak chart positions											Certifications	Album
Title	Year	US	US Alt	US Main. Rock	AUS	BEL (FL)	CAN	GER	NZ	SWE	SWI	UK	Certifications	Album
"Tied to the Tracks"	1985	—	—	—	—	—	—	—	—	—	—	—		Made to Be Broken
"Sometime to Return"	1988	—	—	—	—	—	—	—	—	—	—	—		Hang Time
"Cartoon"	1988	—	—	—	—	—	—	—	—	—	—	—		Hang Time
"Standing in the Doorway"	1988	—	—	—	—	—	—	—	—	—	—	—		Hang Time
"Spinnin'"	1990	—	15	—	—	—	—	—	—	—	—	—		And the Horse They Rode In On
"Easy Street"	1990	—	26	—	—	—	—	—	—	—	—	—		And the Horse They Rode In On
"Somebody to Shove"	1992	—	1	9	123	—	—	—	—	—	—	32		Grave Dancers Union
"Black Gold"	1992	—	6	4	197	—	58	—	25	—	—	26		Grave Dancers Union
"Runaway Train"	1993	5	13	3	11	8	1	4	2	2	2	7	ARIA: Gold; BVMI: Gold; IFPI AUT: Gold; IFPI SWE: Gold; RIAA: 2× Platinum; RMNZ: 2× Platinum	Grave Dancers Union
"Without a Trace"	1993	—	27	6	—	32	37	44	—	—	—	—		Grave Dancers Union
"Summer of Drugs"	1993	—	20	—	—	—	—	—	—	—	—	—		Sweet Relief: A Benefit for Victoria Williams
"Sexual Healing"	1993	—	10	—	—	—	—	—	—	—	—	—		No Alternative
"Can't Even Tell"	1994	—	16	24	194	—	—	—	—	—	—	—		Clerks: Music from the Motion Picture
"Misery"	1995	20	1	2	22	—	3	75	21	—	—	30		Let Your Dim Light Shine
"Just Like Anyone"	1995	—	19	11	114	—	54	—	—	—	—	52		Let Your Dim Light Shine
"Promises Broken"	1996	63	—	29	134	—	14	—	—	—	—	—		Let Your Dim Light Shine
"I Will Still Be Laughing"	1998	—	24	23	—	—	—	—	—	—	—	—		Candy from a Stranger
"Close"	1998	—	—	—	—	—	—	—	—	—	—	—		Candy from a Stranger
"Stand Up and Be Strong"	2006	—	—	—	—	—	—	—	—	—	—	—		The Silver Lining
"Gravity"	2012	—	—	—	—	—	—	—	—	—	—	—		Delayed Reaction
"Supersonic"	2016	—	—	—	—	—	—	—	—	—	—	—		Change of Fortune
"Doomsday"	2016	—	—	—	—	—	—	—	—	—	—	—		Change of Fortune
"Dead Letter"	2020	—	—	—	—	—	—	—	—	—	—	—		Hurry Up And Wait
"If I Told You"	2020	—	—	—	—	—	—	—	—	—	—	—		Hurry Up And Wait
"Got It Pretty Good"	2020	—	—	—	—	—	—	—	—	—	—	—		Hurry Up And Wait
"Here We Go (acoustic)"	2020	—	—	—	—	—	—	—	—	—	—	—		Born Free EP
"High Road"	2024	—	—	—	—	—	—	—	—	—	—	—		Slowly But Shirley
"Freak Accident"	2024	—	—	—	—	—	—	—	—	—	—	—		Slowly But Shirley
"The Only Thing I'm Missing"	2024	—	—	—	—	—	—	—	—	—	—	—		Slowly But Shirley
"—" denotes a recording that did not chart or was not released in that territory.

== Other appearances ==
Title	Year	Album	Notes
"Black and Blue" and "Propaganda"	1982	Barefoot and Pregnant (cassette)	Recorded as Loud Fast Rules. Reissued on CD in 1998.
"Bad Moon" and "Happy"	1982	Kitten Kompilation (cassette)	Recorded as Proud Crass Fools. Reissued as Kitten: A Compilation on CD in 1999.
"It's Not My Fault"	1988	Free To Be… A Family: Marlo Thomas & Friends	Later released on Welcome to the Minority – The A&M Years 1988–1991.
"Barstool Blues"	1989	The Bridge: A Tribute to Neil Young	Cover of a 1975 Neil Young song.
"Baby Baby"	1992	Freedom of Choice: Yesterday's New Wave Hits as Performed by Today's Stars	Cover of a 1977 Vibrators song.
"The Break"	1993	So I Married an Axe Murderer (Original Motion Picture Soundtrack)	Previously released on the B-side of "Black Gold".
"Somebody to Shove" (Live)	1994	The Unplugged Collection, Volume One	Live version from an appearance on MTV Unplugged.
"Misery" (Live)	1995	Minnesota Modern Rock: The Pachyderm Sessions	Acoustic performance for Minnesota radio station 93X.
"Miss This"	1996	Twister: Music from the Motion Picture Soundtrack	Featured in the 1996 film Twister.
"When I Ran Off and Left Her"	1996	Sweet Relief II: Gravity of the Situation	Cover of a 1993 Vic Chesnutt song.
"Eyes of a Child" (Live)	1996	Modern Rock Live	Live version from an appearance on the nationally syndicated radio show Modern Rock Live.
"Motel Notell"	1996	Honor: A Benefit for the Honor the Earth Campaign	Previously released on the B-side of "Promises Broken".
"Back Door Man" (Live; with Iggy Pop)	1996	The Concert for the Rock and Roll Hall of Fame	Live versions from a 1995 concert to celebrate the opening of the Rock and Roll Hall of Fame.
"Sweet Jane" (Live; with Lou Reed)	1996	The Concert for the Rock and Roll Hall of Fame	Live versions from a 1995 concert to celebrate the opening of the Rock and Roll Hall of Fame.
"Losin' It"	1997	I Know What You Did Last Summer (The Album)	Later released on Candy from a Stranger in Japan, and on the B-side of "I Will Still Be Laughing" in Europe.
"School's Out"	1998	The Faculty: Music from the Dimension Motion Picture	Cover of a 1972 Alice Cooper song.
"Good Morning Good Morning"	2010	Minnesota Beatle Project Vol. 2	Cover of a 1967 Beatles song; later released as a bonus track on Delayed Reaction.

== Music videos ==
List of music videos, with directors, showing year released
Title	Year	Director(s)
"Artificial Heart"	1988	Mike Etoll, Dave Pirner, David Roth
"P-9"	1988	Phil Harder
"Sometime to Return"	1988	Kevin Kerslake
"Cartoon"	1988	—N/a
"Easy Street"	1990	Drew Carolan
"Somebody to Shove"	1992	Zack Snyder
"Black Gold"	1993	David Roth
"Runaway Train"	1993	Tony Kaye
"Summer of Drugs"	1993	Chris Hegedus, D. A. Pennebaker
"Without a Trace"	1993	Meiert Avis
"Can't Even Tell"	1994	Kevin Smith
"Misery"	1995	Matt Mahurin
"Just Like Anyone"	1995	P. J. Hogan
"Promises Broken"	1995	Carlos Grasso
"I Will Still Be Laughing"	1998	Mark Neale
"Gravity"	2012	—N/a
"Supersonic"	2016	Dan Huiting
"Here We Go (acoustic)"	2020	Jeneen Anderson
"Hight Road (lyric video)"	2024	12 Inch Media
"Freak Accident (lyric video)"	2024	Jeffrey & Nikki Puccini
"The Only Thing I'm Missing"	2024	David Roth
