= List of people on the United States cover of Rolling Stone (1990s) =

This is a list of people (real or fictional) appearing on the cover of Rolling Stone magazine in the 1990s. This list is for the regular biweekly issues of the magazine, including variant covers, and does not include special issues. Issue numbers that include a slash (XXX/YYY) are combined double issues.

== 1990 ==
Issue number	Cover date	People on cover	Notes
569	January 11, 1990	Tom Cruise	
570	January 25, 1990	Billy Joel	
571	February 8, 1990	Paul McCartney	
572	February 22, 1990	Janet Jackson	
573	March 8, 1990	The Rolling Stones (Mick Jagger, Keith Richards)	
574	March 22, 1990	The B-52's (Kate Pierson, Fred Schneider, Keith Strickland, Cindy Wilson)	
575	April 5, 1990	Aerosmith (Tom Hamilton, Joey Kramer, Joe Perry, Steven Tyler, Brad Whitford)	
576	April 19, 1990	None	1950s issue
577	May 3, 1990	Bonnie Raitt	
578	May 17, 1990	Claudia Schiffer	The Hot List 1990
579	May 31, 1990	Warren Beatty	
580	June 14, 1990	Sinéad O'Connor	
581	June 28, 1990	Bart Simpson	
582/583	July 12–26, 1990	Tom Cruise	
584	August 9, 1990	Julia Roberts	
585	August 23, 1990	John Lennon	1960s issue
586	September 6, 1990	M.C. Hammer	
587	September 20, 1990	Led Zeppelin (Jimmy Page, Robert Plant)	1970s issue
588	October 4, 1990	Twin Peaks cast (Mädchen Amick, Lara Flynn Boyle, Sherilyn Fenn)	
589	October 18, 1990	Prince	
590	November 1, 1990	Living Colour (Will Calhoun, Corey Glover, Vernon Reid, Muzz Skillings)	
591	November 15, 1990	Bruce Springsteen	1980s issue
592	November 29, 1990	Kevin Costner	
593/594	December 13–27, 1990	People from covers of issues 569–575, 577-592	1990 year-end issue

== 1991 ==
Issue number	Cover date	People on cover	Notes
595	January 10, 1991	Johnny Depp	
596	January 24, 1991	Slash	
597	February 7, 1991	Sting	
598	February 21, 1991	Robin Williams	
599	March 7, 1991	Sinéad O'Connor	
600	March 21, 1991	Jodie Foster	
601	April 4, 1991	Jim Morrison	
602	April 18, 1991	Nuno Bettencourt, The Charlatans UK (Martin Blunt, Jon Brookes, Tim Burgess, Rob Collins, Jon Day), De La Soul (David Jude Jolicoeur, Vincent Mason, Kelvin Mercer), Chris Isaak	"New Faces '91" cover story
603	May 2, 1991	Wilson Phillips (Chynna Phillips, Carnie Wilson, Wendy Wilson)	
604	May 16, 1991	Winona Ryder	The Hot List 1991
605	May 30, 1991	The Black Crowes (Jeff Cease, Johnny Colt, Steve Gorman, Chris Robinson, Rich Robinson)	
606	June 13, 1991	Madonna	
607	June 27, 1991	R.E.M. (Bill Berry, Peter Buck, Mike Mills, Michael Stipe)	
608/609	July 11–25, 1991	Rachel Hunter, Rod Stewart	
610	August 8, 1991	Tom Petty	
611	August 22, 1991	Arnold Schwarzenegger	
612	September 5, 1991	Guns N' Roses (Duff McKagan, Dizzy Reed, Axl Rose, Slash, Matt Sorum, Izzy Stradlin)	
613	September 19, 1991	Sebastian Bach	
614	October 3, 1991	Paul Reubens	
615	October 17, 1991	Eric Clapton	
616	October 31, 1991	Jerry Garcia	
617	November 14, 1991	Metallica (Kirk Hammett, James Hetfield, Jason Newsted, Lars Ulrich)	
618	November 28, 1991	U2 (Bono, Adam Clayton, The Edge, Larry Mullen Jr.)	
619/620	December 12–26, 1991	People from covers of issues 595–601, 603-618	1991 year-end issue

== 1992 ==
Issue number	Cover date	People on cover	Notes
621	January 9, 1992	Michael Jackson	
622	January 23, 1992	Hunter S. Thompson	
623	February 6, 1992	Jimi Hendrix	
624	February 20, 1992	Beverly Hills, 90210 cast (Shannen Doherty, Luke Perry, Jason Priestley)	
625	March 5, 1992	R.E.M. (Bill Berry, Peter Buck, Mike Mills, Michael Stipe)	
626	March 19, 1992	Wayne's World cast (Dana Carvey, Mike Myers)	
627	April 2, 1992	Axl Rose	
628	April 16, 1992	Nirvana (Kurt Cobain, Dave Grohl, Krist Novoselic)	
629	April 30, 1992	Def Leppard (Rick Allen, Phil Collen, Joe Elliott, Rick Savage)	
630	May 14, 1992	Sharon Stone	The Hot List 1992
631	May 28, 1992	Tom Cruise	
632	June 11, 1992	None	25th anniversary issue; "The Great Stories" cover story
633	June 25, 1992	Red Hot Chili Peppers (Flea, Anthony Kiedis, Chad Smith)	John Frusciante was originally part of the cover photo, but was removed after he left the band
634/635	July 9–23, 1992	Batman	
636	August 6, 1992	Bruce Springsteen	
637	August 20, 1992	Ice-T	
638	September 3, 1992	Michelle Pfeiffer	
639	September 17, 1992	Bill Clinton	
640	October 1, 1992	Bono	
641	October 15, 1992	None	25th anniversary issue; "The Interviews" cover story
642	October 29, 1992	Sinéad O'Connor	
643	November 12, 1992	None	25th anniversary issue; "Portraits" cover story
644	November 26, 1992	Denzel Washington	
645/646	December 10–24, 1992	People from covers of issues 621–631, 633–640, 642-644	1992 year-end issue

== 1993 ==
Issue number	Cover date	People on cover	Notes
647	January 7, 1993	Spin Doctors (Chris Barron, Aaron Comess, Eric Schenkman, Mark White)	
648	January 21, 1993	Neil Young	
649	February 4, 1993	Neneh Cherry	
650	February 18, 1993	David Letterman	
651	March 4, 1993	Bono	
652	March 18, 1993	Natalie Merchant	
653	April 1, 1993	Garth Brooks	
654	April 15, 1993	James Hetfield	
655	April 29, 1993	Eric Clapton	
656	May 13, 1993	Dana Carvey	The Hot List 1993
657	May 27, 1993	Sting	
658	June 10, 1993	Whitney Houston	
659	June 24, 1993	Laura Dern	
660/661	July 8–22, 1993	Seinfeld cast (Jason Alexander, Julia Louis-Dreyfus, Michael Richards, Jerry Seinfeld)	
662	August 5, 1993	Soul Asylum (Karl Mueller, Dan Murphy, Dave Pirner, Grant Young)	
663	August 19, 1993	Beavis and Butt-head	
664	September 2, 1993	Jerry Garcia	
665	September 16, 1993	Janet Jackson	René Elizondo Jr.'s hands are covering Jackson's breasts on the cover
666	September 30, 1993	Dr. Dre, Snoop Dogg	
667	October 14, 1993	The Edge	
668	October 28, 1993	Pearl Jam (Dave Abbruzzese, Jeff Ament, Stone Gossard, Mike McCready, Eddie Vedder)	
669	November 11, 1993	Blind Melon (Glen Graham, Shannon Hoon, Brad Smith, Rogers Stevens, Christopher Thorn)	
670	November 25, 1993	Shaquille O'Neal	
671	December 9, 1993	Bill Clinton	
672/673	December 23, 1993 – January 6, 1994	Cindy Crawford	

== 1994 ==
Issue number	Cover date	People on cover	Notes
674	January 27, 1994	Nirvana (Kurt Cobain, Dave Grohl, Krist Novoselic)	
675	February 10, 1994	Howard Stern	
676	February 24, 1994	Bob Marley	
677	March 10, 1994	Winona Ryder	
678	March 24, 1994	Beavis and Butt-head	
679	April 7, 1994	Anthony Kiedis	
680	April 21, 1994	The Smashing Pumpkins (Jimmy Chamberlin, Billy Corgan, James Iha, D'arcy Wretzky)	
681	May 5, 1994	None	"Drugs in America" cover story
682	May 19, 1994	Melrose Place cast (Laura Leighton, Josie Bissett, Heather Locklear, Daphne Zuniga, Courtney Thorne-Smith)	The Hot List 1994
683	June 2, 1994	Kurt Cobain	
684	June 16, 1994	Soundgarden (Matt Cameron, Chris Cornell, Ben Shepherd, Kim Thayil)	
685	June 30, 1994	Counting Crows (Steve Bowman, David Bryson, Adam Duritz, Charlie Gillingham, Matt Malley, Dan Vickrey)	
686/687	July 14–28, 1994	Julia Roberts	
688	August 11, 1994	Beastie Boys (Ad-Rock, Mike D, Adam Yauch)	Matthew Rolston appears on the cover reflected in a mirror while taking the cover photo
689	August 25, 1994	The Rolling Stones (Mick Jagger, Keith Richards, Charlie Watts, Ron Wood)	
690	September 8, 1994	Trent Reznor	
691	September 22, 1994	Jerry Seinfeld	Seinfeld appears as a young Elvis Presley
691	September 22, 1994	Jerry Seinfeld	Seinfeld appears as an old Elvis Presley
692	October 6, 1994	Liz Phair	
693	October 20, 1994	R.E.M. (Bill Berry, Peter Buck, Mike Mills, Michael Stipe)	
694	November 3, 1994	Liv Tyler, Steven Tyler	
695	November 17, 1994	None	"Generation Next" cover story
696	December 1, 1994	Brad Pitt	
697	December 15, 1994	Courtney Love	
698/699	December 29, 1994 – January 12, 1995	David Letterman	

== 1995 ==
Issue number	Cover date	People on cover	Notes
700	January 26, 1995	Green Day (Billie Joe Armstrong, Tré Cool, Mike Dirnt)	
701	February 9, 1995	Demi Moore	
702	February 23, 1995	Led Zeppelin (Jimmy Page, Robert Plant)	
703	March 9, 1995	Ethan Hawke	
704	March 23, 1995	Dolores O'Riordan	
705	April 6, 1995	Eddie Van Halen	
706	April 20, 1995	Belly (Tanya Donelly, Chris Gorman, Tom Gorman, Gail Greenwood)	
707	May 4, 1995	Tom Petty	
708	May 18, 1995	Friends cast (Jennifer Aniston, Courteney Cox, Lisa Kudrow, Matt LeBlanc, Matthew Perry, David Schwimmer)	
709	June 1, 1995	Melissa Etheridge	
710	June 15, 1995	Drew Barrymore	
711	June 29, 1995	Soul Asylum (Sterling Campbell, Karl Mueller, Dan Murphy, Dave Pirner)	
712/713	July 13–27, 1995	Jim Carrey	
714	August 10, 1995	Hootie & the Blowfish (Mark Bryan, Dean Felber, Darius Rucker, Jim Sonefeld)	
715	August 24, 1995	Hole (Melissa Auf der Maur, Eric Erlandson, Courtney Love, Patty Schemel)	The Hot List 1995
716	September 7, 1995	Alicia Silverstone	
717	September 21, 1995	Jerry Garcia	
718	October 5, 1995	Foo Fighters (William Goldsmith, Dave Grohl, Nate Mendel, Pat Smear)	
719	October 19, 1995	Red Hot Chili Peppers (Flea, Anthony Kiedis, Dave Navarro, Chad Smith)	
720	November 2, 1995	Alanis Morissette	
721	November 16, 1995	The Smashing Pumpkins (Jimmy Chamberlin, Billy Corgan, James Iha, D'arcy Wretzky)	
722	November 30, 1995	Lenny Kravitz	
723	December 14, 1995	Mick Jagger	
724/725	December 28, 1995 – January 11, 1996	Green Day (Billie Joe Armstrong, Tré Cool, Mike Dirnt)	Coolio, Billy Corgan, Sheryl Crow, Jerry Garcia, Courtney Love, Alanis Morissette, and John Travolta appear in the "Rock & Roll Yearbook" banner in the middle of the cover

== 1996 ==
Issue number	Cover date	People on cover	Notes
726	January 25, 1996	Live (Patrick Dahlheimer, Chad Gracey, Ed Kowalczyk, Chad Taylor)	
727	February 8, 1996	Layne Staley	
728	February 22, 1996	John Travolta	
729	March 7, 1996	Jennifer Aniston	
730	March 21, 1996	Joan Osborne	
731	April 4, 1996	Sean Penn	
732	April 18, 1996	Gavin Rossdale	
733	May 2, 1996	Oasis (Liam Gallagher, Noel Gallagher)	
734	May 16, 1996	The X-Files cast (Gillian Anderson, David Duchovny)	
735	May 30, 1996	David Letterman	
736	June 13, 1996	Beck, Jimmy Buffett, Sandra Bullock, Billy Corgan, Chris Cornell, Perry Farrell, Kiss (Peter Criss, Ace Frehley, Gene Simmons, Paul Stanley), Alanis Morissette, John Popper, James Taylor	"Rock & Roll Summer" cover story
737	June 27, 1996	Metallica (Kirk Hammett, James Hetfield, Jason Newsted, Lars Ulrich)	
738/739	July 11–25, 1996	Jenny McCarthy	
740	August 8, 1996	Jerry Garcia	
741	August 22, 1996	Cameron Diaz	The Hot List 1996
742	September 5, 1996	The Fugees (Lauryn Hill, Wyclef Jean, Pras)	
743	September 19, 1996	Conan O'Brien	
744	October 3, 1996	Brooke Shields	
745	October 17, 1996	R.E.M. (Bill Berry, Peter Buck, Mike Mills, Michael Stipe)	
746	October 31, 1996	Tupac Shakur	
747	November 14, 1996	Sheryl Crow	
748	November 28, 1996	Eddie Vedder	
749	December 12, 1996	Dennis Rodman	
750/751	December 26, 1996 – January 9, 1997	Pamela Anderson, Beavis and Butt-head	

== 1997 ==
Issue number	Cover date	People on cover	Notes
752	January 23, 1997	Marilyn Manson	
753	February 6, 1997	Stone Temple Pilots (Dean DeLeo, Robert DeLeo, Eric Kretz, Scott Weiland)	
754	February 20, 1997	Gillian Anderson	Chris Carter appears on the cover wearing a Creature from the Black Lagoon costume; the inside article features a picture of Carter wearing the costume with the head removed
755	March 6, 1997	David Lynch, Trent Reznor	
756	March 20, 1997	Howard Stern	
757	April 3, 1997	Brad Pitt	
758	April 17, 1997	Beck	
759	May 1, 1997	No Doubt (Tom Dumont, Tony Kanal, Gwen Stefani, Adrian Young)	
760	May 15, 1997	Jewel	
761	May 29, 1997	U2 (Bono, Adam Clayton, The Edge, Larry Mullen Jr.)	Allen Ginsberg appears at the top of the cover in honor of his death
762	June 12, 1997	Jakob Dylan	
763	June 26, 1997	Sandra Bullock	
764/765	July 10–24, 1997	Spice Girls (Victoria Beckham, Mel B, Emma Bunton, Melanie C, Geri Halliwell)	
766	August 7, 1997	Sean Combs	
767	August 21, 1997	Keith Flint	The Hot List 1997
768	September 4, 1997	Zack de la Rocha, RZA	
769	September 18, 1997	Neve Campbell	
770	October 2, 1997	Chris Rock	
771	October 16, 1997	Salt-N-Pepa (Sandra "Pepa" Denton, DJ Spinderella, Cheryl "Salt" James)	
772	October 30, 1997	Fleetwood Mac (Lindsey Buckingham, Mick Fleetwood, Christine McVie, John McVie, Stevie Nicks)	
773	November 13, 1997	Courtney Love, Madonna, Tina Turner	30th anniversary issue; "Women of Rock" cover story
774	November 27, 1997	Saturday Night Live cast (Will Ferrell, Chris Kattan, Cheri Oteri, Molly Shannon)	
775	December 11, 1997	The Rolling Stones (Mick Jagger, Keith Richards)	
776/777	December 25, 1997 – January 8, 1998	Scream 2 cast (Neve Campbell, Sarah Michelle Gellar, Heather Graham, Jada Pinkett Smith, Tori Spelling)	

== 1998 ==
Issue number	Cover date	People on cover	Notes
778	January 22, 1998	Fiona Apple	
779	February 5, 1998	Mariah Carey	
780	February 19, 1998	South Park cast (Kyle Broflovski, Eric Cartman, Stan Marsh, Kenny McCormick)	
781	March 5, 1998	Kate Winslet	
782	March 19, 1998	Jack Nicholson	
783	April 2, 1998	Sarah Michelle Gellar	
784	April 16, 1998	Richard Ashcroft	
785	April 30, 1998	Sarah McLachlan	
786	May 14, 1998	Jerry Springer	
787	May 28, 1998	Seinfeld cast (Jason Alexander, Julia Louis-Dreyfus, Michael Richards, Jerry Seinfeld)	
788	June 11, 1998	Johnny Depp	
789	June 25, 1998	Tori Amos	
790/791	July 9–23, 1998	Madonna	
792	August 6, 1998	Beastie Boys (Ad-Rock, Mike D, Adam Yauch)	
793	August 20, 1998	Laetitia Casta	The Hot List 1998
794	September 3, 1998	Shania Twain	
795	September 17, 1998	Katie Holmes	
796	October 1, 1998	Janet Jackson	
797	October 15, 1998	Marilyn Manson	
798	October 29, 1998	Jay-Z, Wyclef Jean, Master P	"Hip-Hop Now: The Top 50 Players" cover story
799	November 12, 1998	Bill Clinton	
800	November 26, 1998	Alanis Morissette	
801	December 10, 1998	Will Smith	
802/803	December 24, 1998 – January 7, 1999	Jewel	

== 1999 ==
Issue number	Cover date	People on cover	Notes
804	January 21, 1999	Beastie Boys (Ad-Rock, Mike D, Adam Yauch)	
805	February 4, 1999	Rob Zombie	
806	February 18, 1999	Lauryn Hill	
807	March 4, 1999	Jennifer Aniston	
808	March 18, 1999	Mark McGrath	
809	April 1, 1999	Jimi Hendrix	
810	April 15, 1999	Britney Spears	
811	April 29, 1999	Eminem	
812	May 13, 1999	Kurt Cobain	
813	May 27, 1999	Backstreet Boys (Nick Carter, Howie Dorough, Brian Littrell, AJ McLean, Kevin Richardson)	
813	May 27, 1999	Jennifer Love Hewitt	
814	June 10, 1999	Mike Myers	
815	June 24, 1999	Jar Jar Binks	Cover includes a picture of Chewbacca, Carrie Fisher, Harrison Ford, and Mark Hamill from the cover of issue 246
816/817	July 8–22, 1999	Nicole Kidman	
818	August 5, 1999	Ricky Martin	Martin appears with unidentified models
819	August 19, 1999	Angelina Jolie	The Hot List 1999
820	September 2, 1999	Trey Anastasio, Sheryl Crow, Jonathan Davis, DMX, Fred Durst, James Hetfield, Wyclef Jean, Jewel, Kid Rock, Dave Matthews, Alanis Morissette, Red Hot Chili Peppers (Flea, Anthony Kiedis), Zack de la Rocha, Tom Rowlands, Bruce Springsteen	Summer concerts cover story; Peter Stroud appears in the Crow photo; Max Weinberg appears in the Springsteen photo; cover includes unidentified concertgoers
821	September 16, 1999	David Spade	Spade appears with models Manon von Gerkan and Tatjana Patitz
822	September 30, 1999	Eddie Vedder	"The Greatest Concerts of the '90s" cover story; cover includes unidentified concertgoers
823	October 14, 1999	Trent Reznor	
824	October 28, 1999	Brad Pitt	
825	November 11, 1999	Nicolas Cage	
826	November 25, 1999	Rage Against the Machine (Tim Commerford, Tom Morello, Zack de la Rocha, Brad Wilk)	
827	December 9, 1999	Christina Ricci	
828/829	December 16–23, 1999	Drew Barrymore, Bono, David Bowie, Frances Bean Cobain, Kurt Cobain, Bob Dylan, Aretha Franklin, Mick Jagger, John Lennon, LL Cool J, Courtney Love, Madonna, Joni Mitchell, Jack Nicholson, Lou Reed, Keith Richards, Britney Spears, Bruce Springsteen	"Behind the Scenes: 1967–1999" cover story; the Barrymore, Bono, and Jagger photos include unidentified people
830/831	December 30, 1999 – January 6, 2000	Muhammad Ali, Pamela Anderson, Beck, Yasmine Bleeth, Ray Bolger, Bono, Marlon Brando, James Brown, Billie Burke, Fidel Castro, Charlie Chaplin, Chuck D, Eric Clapton, Bill Clinton, Hillary Clinton, Kurt Cobain, Lou Costello, Walter Cronkite, Tom Cruise, Miles Davis, James Dean, Diana, Princess of Wales, Bob Dylan, Clint Eastwood, Albert Einstein, E.T. the Extra-Terrestrial, Carrie Fisher, Flavor Flav, Flea, Sarah Michelle Gellar, Allen Ginsberg, Betty Grable, Jack Haley, Mark Hamill, Margaret Hamilton, Oliver Hardy, George Harrison, Hugh Hefner, Jimi Hendrix, Jesse Jackson, Mick Jagger, Elton John, Enzo Junior,Brian Jones, Janis Joplin, John F. Kennedy, Anthony Kiedis, Martin Luther King Jr., Stephen King, Bert Lahr, Fabio Lanzoni, Stan Laurel, Lucy Lawless, Bruce Lee, John Lennon, David Letterman, Little Richard, John Lydon, Madonna, Nelson Mandela, Marilyn Manson, Ricky Martin, Paul McCartney, Darryl McDaniels, Marilyn Monroe, Clayton Moore, Mike Myers, Jack Nicholson, Ol' Dirty Bastard, Roy Orbison, Alexandra Paul, Elvis Presley, Paul Reubens, Keith Richards, R2-D2, Babe Ruth, Carlos Santana, Martin Scorsese, Jerry Seinfeld, Joseph Simmons, Slash, Chad Smith, Kevin Sorbo, Bruce Springsteen, Ringo Starr, Hunter S. Thompson, Pete Townshend, Andy Warhol, Charlie Watts, John Wayne, Stevie Wonder, Bill Wyman	Millennium issue; cover includes unidentified celebrities, models, and lookalikes of David Bowie, Boy George, Cher, Peter Criss, La Toya Jackson, Michael Jackson, Elton John, Madonna, Marilyn Monroe, Patti Smith, Britney Spears, and Vanilla Ice

== Sources ==
- Rolling Stone Coverwall 1967–2013
- Rolling Stone: 1,000 Covers: A History of the Most Influential Magazine in Pop Culture, New York, NY: Abrams, 2006. ISBN 0-8109-5865-1
