= Black Gold: The Best of Soul Asylum =

Greatest hits album by Soul Asylum
- Released: September 26, 2000
- Recorded: 1988–1998
- Genre: Alternative rock
- Length: 73:40
- Label: Columbia / Legacy
- Producer: Lenny Kaye; Bruce Dickinson; Soul Asylum

Soul Asylum chronology
Candy from a Stranger (1998)	Black Gold: The Best of Soul Asylum (2000)	After the Flood: Live from the Grand Forks Prom, June 28, 1997 (2004)

Professional ratings
Review scores
Source	Rating
AllMusic	4.5/5 stars
Entertainment Weekly	B−

Black Gold: The Best of Soul Asylum is the second compilation album by Soul Asylum. It contains 19 of their greatest hits.

The title of the album comes from Soul Asylum's song of the same name, which was a hit single from their 1992 breakthrough album Grave Dancers Union.

The disc contains two outtakes ("Candy from a Stranger" and "Lonely for You") from Soul Asylum's previous album Candy from a Stranger, as well as two previously unreleased live recordings ("Closer to the Stars" and "Stranger").

== Track listing ==
All songs written by Dave Pirner, unless otherwise noted.

1. "Just Like Anyone" – 2:47
2. "Cartoon" – 3:53 (Murphy)
3. "Closer to the Stars" (Recorded Live at The Palais Royale in Toronto, Ontario on April 3, 1995) – 3:52
4. "Somebody to Shove" – 3:15
5. "Close" – 4:34
6. "String of Pearls" – 4:52
7. "Tied to the Tracks" – 2:43
8. "Runaway Train" – 4:27
9. "Sometime to Return" – 3:30
10. "Misery" – 4:26
11. "We 3" – 4:08
12. "Without a Trace" – 3:40
13. "I Will Still Be Laughing" - 3:45
14. "Black Gold" – 3:56
15. "Summer of Drugs" – 4:06 (Williams)
16. "Candy from a Stranger" – 4:16 (Campbell, Mueller, Pirner)
17. "Stranger" (Recorded Live - MTV Unplugged in New York City on April 21, 1993) – 4:07
18. "Can't Even Tell" - 3:14
19. "Lonely for You" (Outtake from "Candy from a Stranger" album) – 4:09

The Japanese release also contained one previously unreleased bonus track, "When I Ran Off and Left Her" (Chesnutt), for a total of 20 songs.
