= Welcome to the Minority – The A&M Years 1988–1991 =

Welcome To The Minority – The A&M Years 1988–1991

Compilation album by Soul Asylum
- Released: August 10, 2007
- Recorded: 1988–91
- Genre: Rock
- Label: Hip-O Select
- Producer: Lenny Kaye, Steve Jordan, Soul Asylum

Soul Asylum chronology
The Silver Lining (2006)	Welcome To The Minority – The A&M Years 1988–1991 (2007)	Playlist: The Very Best of Soul Asylum (2011)

Welcome to the Minority – The A&M Years 1988–1991 is a compilation album that contains three CDs of Soul Asylum's work during the time they were under their A&M label. 5,000 copies were issued for this limited edition set.

The title of the album, Welcome to the Minority comes from the song "Down on Up to Me" which was from Soul Asylum's 1988 album Hang Time.

== Track listing ==
All songs written by David Pirner, unless otherwise noted.

Disc One - Hang Time

1. "Down on Up to Me"
2. "Little Too Clean"
3. "Sometime to Return"
4. "Cartoon" (Dan Murphy)
5. "Beggars and Choosers"
6. "Endless Farewell"
7. "Standing in the Doorway"
8. "Marionette"
9. "Ode"
10. "Jack of All Trades"
11. "Twiddly Dee"
12. "Heavy Rotation"
13. "Put the Bone In"
14. "Just Plain Evil" † (Originally released on Clam Dip & Other Delights)
15. "It's Not My Fault" † (Originally released on Free To Be...A Family compilation) (Sarah Durkee, Christopher Cerf)

Disc Two - And the Horse They Rode in On

1. "Spinnin'"
2. "Bitter Pill"
3. "Veil of Tears"
4. "Nice Guys (Don't Get Paid)"
5. "Something Out of Nothing"
6. "Gullible's Travels" (Murphy)
7. "Brand New Shine"
8. "Easy Street" (Murphy, Pirner)
9. "Grounded"
10. "Be On Your Way"
11. "We 3"
12. "All the King's Friends"
13. "Something Out of Nothing" Remix †

Disc Three - Live in Chicago, IL, and Ann Arbor, MI, Oct 1990 †

1. "The Tracks of My Tears" (Smokey Robinson, Warren Moore, Marvin Tarplin)
2. "Something Out of Nothing"
3. "Freaks"
4. "Put a Spell on You" (Screamin' Jay Hawkins)
5. "Cartoon" (Murphy)
6. "Be On Your Way"
7. "Closer to the Stars"
8. "Marionette"
9. "All the King's Friends"
10. "Made to Be Broken"
11. "Little Too Clean"
12. "Movin' On" (Billy Gibbons, Dusty Hill) ††
13. "Nice Guys (Don't Get Paid)"
14. "To Sir with Love" (Don Black, Mark London)

† = First time release or available on another format.

†† = Though listed on Welcome to the Minority as "Movin' On" with writer unknown, the song was originally recorded by ZZ Top as "Move Me On Down The Line" on their 1973 album Tres Hombres.
