= Playlist: The Very Best of Soul Asylum =

Greatest hits album by Soul Asylum
- Released: January 25, 2011
- Recorded: 1988–2006
- Genre: Alternative rock
- Length: 53:17
- Label: Columbia/Legacy

Soul Asylum chronology
Welcome To The Minority - The A&M Years 1988-1991 (2007)	Playlist: The Very Best of Soul Asylum (2011)	Delayed Reaction (2012)

Professional ratings
Review scores
Source	Rating
Allmusic	4/5 stars

Playlist: The Very Best of Soul Asylum is a compilation album containing 14 of the greatest hits by Soul Asylum.

The album is part of the Playlist album series issued by Columbia Records and Legacy Recordings.

The disc contains live recordings of the songs "Never Really Been", "Without a Trace" and "I Will Still Be Laughing", as well as the song "By the Way", previously released only as a B-side on the Runaway Train single.

== Track listing ==
All songs written by Dave Pirner, unless otherwise noted.

1. "Never Really Been" (live) - 3:12
2. "Cartoon" - 3:53 (Murphy)
3. "Easy Street" - 3:36
4. "Somebody to Shove" - 3:14
5. "Runaway Train" - 4:25
6. "By the Way" - 3:44
7. "Black Gold" - 3:55
8. "Sexual Healing" - 4:41 (Brown, Gaye, Ritz)
9. "Misery" - 4:26
10. "Without a Trace" (live) - 3:18
11. "Just Like Anyone" - 2:48
12. "When I Ran Off and Left Her" - 3:57 (Chesnutt)
13. "I Will Still Be Laughing" (live) - 3:44
14. "Stand Up and Be Strong" - 4:24
