= Closer to the Stars: Best of the Twin/Tone Years =

Greatest hits album by Soul Asylum
- Released: April 4, 2006
- Recorded: 1983–1986
- Genre: Alternative rock
- Length: 44:36
- Label: Rykodisc
- Producer: Tom Herbers; Bob Mould; Chris Osgood; Soul Asylum

Soul Asylum chronology
After the Flood: Live from the Grand Forks Prom, June 28, 1997 (2004)	Closer to the Stars: Best of the Twin/Tone Years (2006)	The Silver Lining (2006)

Professional ratings
Review scores
Source	Rating
Allmusic	link

Closer to the Stars: Best of the Twin/Tone Years is Soul Asylum's third compilation greatest hits album. This album contains all of their greatest hits during the time they were under the Twin/Tone label (1983–1986). The album also contains two previously unreleased cover tracks, "Move Over" and "Jukebox Hero" that were not available in the U.S. These songs were only available on the UK release of Clam Dip & Other Delights.

== Track listing ==
All songs written by Dave Pirner unless otherwise noted.

1. "Closer To The Stars" – 2:53
2. "Can't Go Back" – 3:05 (Murphy)
3. "Jukebox Hero" – 4:03 (Gramm, Jones)
4. "Stranger" – 3:44
5. "Another World, Another Day" – 1:59
6. "Draggin' Me Down" – 2:08
7. "Tied To The Tracks" – 2:42
8. "Miracle Mile" – 2:18 (Murphy)
9. "Move Over" – 2:25 (Joplin)
10. "Never Really Been" – 2:52
11. "No Man's Land" – 2:57
12. "Freaks" – 3:27
13. "Carry On" – 2:22
14. "Long Way Home" – 2:28 (Murphy)
15. "Crashing Down" – 2:16 (Murphy)
16. "Ship Of Fools" – 2:49

== Personnel ==
- Tom Herbers – Producer
- Bob Mould – Producer
- Chris Osgood – Producer
