= Delayed Reaction =

Studio album by Soul Asylum
- Released: July 17, 2012
- Recorded: 2010–2012
- Studio: Flowers, Minneapolis, Minnesota
- Genre: Alternative rock
- Length: 33:02
- Label: 429
- Producer: Soul Asylum, John Fields

Soul Asylum chronology
Playlist: The Very Best of Soul Asylum (2007)	Delayed Reaction (2012)	Change of Fortune (2016)

Delayed Reaction is Soul Asylum's 10th full-length studio album and follow-up to their 2006 studio release The Silver Lining. It was released on July 17, 2012, and debuted at No. 160 on Billboard. It is their first album released on 429 Records.

== Reception ==
Professional ratings
Aggregate scores
Source	Rating
Metacritic	72/100
Review scores
Source	Rating
AllMusic	3.5/5 stars
The A.V. Club	B
Consequence of Sound	C−

Delayed Reaction received positive reviews from critics upon release. On Metacritic, the album holds a score of 72/100 based on 4 reviews, indicating "generally favorable reviews".

== Track listing ==
All tracks are written by Dave Pirner.

No.	Title	Length
1.	"Gravity"	4:32
2.	"Into the Light"	3:58
3.	"The Streets"	2:49
4.	"By the Way"	3:21
5.	"Pipe Dream"	2:45
6.	"Let's All Kill Each Other"	2:40
7.	"Cruel Intentions"	3:54
8.	"The Juice"	3:38
9.	"Take Manhattan"	2:55
10.	"I Should've Stayed in Bed"	5:10

Exclusive Best Buy edition bonus tracks
No.	Title	Length
11.	"Leave This Town"	3:08
12.	"Time Will Tell"	3:03
13.	"Your Generation"	3:07
14.	"Good Morning Good Morning"	2:41

"By the Way" was originally released in demo form 20 years earlier as a B-Side to the 1992 single "Somebody to Shove"; "Let's All Kill Each Other" was originally released on Saturday, October 25, 2008, on EnterTheSoulAsylum.com as a free download until the 2008 U.S. Election Day (Tuesday, November 4, 2008), and "I Should've Stayed in Bed" was originally released in 1998 on Live at the Palais Royale and "Good Morning, Good Morning" is a cover of The Beatles song from their album Sgt. Pepper's Lonely Hearts Club Band

== Band members ==
- Dave Pirner – lead vocals, rhythm guitar
- Dan Murphy – lead guitar, backing vocals
- Tommy Stinson – bass
- Michael Bland – drums
