= Alex Etheridge =

American musician and bone cancer patient (died 2023)

- Born: October 22, 2009
- Died: July 19, 2023 (aged 13); Phoenix, Arizona, U.S.
- Known for: "Home Sweet Home"
- Website: alexetheridge.com

Alex Etheridge (October 22, 2009 – July 19, 2023) was an American boy from Phoenix, Arizona, whose battle with bone cancer received international attention, leading to recording with the Minneapolis rock band Soul Asylum and a viral video of a meeting with his musical hero, Travis Barker of Blink-182.

== Background ==
Alex Etheridge was diagnosed with bone cancer in January 2022, at age 12. After then he underwent treatment including chemotherapy, radiation, and two clinical trials, which required travel to Houston, Texas.

Etheridge played drums and guitar since age 5. Playing music gave him a positive focus during long, painful hospital stays. He was a fan of pop-punk bands such as Green Day and Blink-182, in particular drummer Travis Barker.

In January 2023, doctors estimated that Etheridge had only six months to live.

== Soul Asylum and "Home Sweet Home" ==
Through the nonprofit organization Kill Kancer, Etheridge met the members of Minnesota alternative rock group Soul Asylum, first through a Zoom call and in March 2023, at the band's invitation, Etheridge and his family traveled to Minneapolis to meet in person. (Kill Kancer was founded by Mary Beth Mueller, the widow of original Soul Asylum bassist Karl Mueller, who died of esophageal cancer in 2005.)

Soul Asylum singer Dave Pirner and bassist Jeremy Tappero met Etheridge at Flowers Studio in Minneapolis, which was founded by musician Ed Ackerson, who died of pancreatic cancer in 2019; Ackerson's widow Ashley donated the studio time to Etheridge. At Flowers, the trio recorded Etheridge's song "Home Sweet Home". The song is about how Etheridge's thoughts of returning home helped him deal with being in the hospital. It was largely written by Etheridge himself, who had worked out the drum parts, lyrics, and main guitar riff before meeting with Soul Asylum. He and the band spent four hours in the studio working on the song, which was later released on SoundCloud.

Etheridge performed his music live in May 2023 with the Arizona punk band Authority Zero.

== Blink-182 ==
A report on Phoenix TV station KSAZ-TV was seen by Australian social-media influencer Samuel Weidenhofer, who traveled from Melbourne to help arrange a meeting with Alex's idol Travis Barker. Etheridge met Barker backstage at Blink-182's June 14, 2023, concert in Phoenix, and Etheridge and his family sat in the front row for the concert later. The two spent more than an hour together, talking and playing drums, including an introduction to Barker's wife Kourtney Kardashian via FaceTime.

Weidenhofer recorded the meeting with Barker and released it later as a TikTok video, which has received more than 17 million views as of July 2023.

== Death ==
Etheridge's condition worsened around July 18, and friends and family gathered to say goodbye. He also received a message from Barker, and spoke with LSU gymnast Olivia Dunne and actress Jennifer Lawrence.

Alex Etheridge died on the morning of July 19, 2023, at the age of 13.
