= The Tomatoes =

- Origin: New Orleans
- Genres: Rock
- Years active: 2004

The Tomatoes are an American rock band from New Orleans, Louisiana. The band is composed of vocalist/guitarist Will Burdette, drummer Woody Dantagnan, and bassist/vocalist George Ortolano. Their music has been compared to everyone from the Afghan Whigs, Pearl Jam, MC5, and The Ramones, to acts such as the Butthole Surfers, The Stooges, Bruce Springsteen, The Hold Steady, and Nine Inch Nails.

== Background ==
The Tomatoes formed in 2004 over pints of Guinness at a bar in Metairie, LA, a suburb of New Orleans. The band recorded their first LP later that same year; Dave Pirner of Soul Asylum co-produced the lead track “She Wore A Yellow Gas Mask” with George Ortolano. Grammy TM Award winning Engineer, Trina Shoemaker, provided additional input on the recording of the album. The Rise And Fall Of The Tomatoes was released in New Orleans record stores and on the Internet in March 2005, which garnered much praise from the New Orleans music press.

Early in their career, The Tomatoes toured the U.S. in a heatless, AC-less 1982 Ford Econoline van they dubbed “The Blue Runner,” in honor of the popular New Orleans brand of canned red beans. They performed coast-to-coast from the Sunset Strip in L.A., to a German social club in San Antonio, TX, and finally NY, NY. Friend and fellow New Orleans musician Scott Frilot also joined the band on guitar for a short time. Frilot later started his own band, Ginger and The Bee. While continuing to perform mostly in New Orleans, New York, and Atlanta, The Tomatoes quickly released two more LPs that garnered critical acclaim: Trendy in 2006 and Divisionism in 2008. For part of 2006 the band resided in New York, NY, at times performing in red and white marching band jackets. They also performed at the 2007 CMJ Music Marathon.

== Discography ==
The Rise and Fall of The Tomatoes, March 2005

Standing (Right Next to You) (single), September 2005

Trendy, October 2006

Divisionism, November 2008

The Tomatoes, October 2011

Into the Blackout EP, December 2012
