= Grant Young (musician) =

American drummer

- Born: Grant Young; January 5, 1964 (age 61); Iowa City, Iowa, U.S.
- Genres: Alternative rock, Rock
- Occupation: Musician
- Instrument(s): Drums, percussion
- Years active: 1984–1995
- Labels: Twin/Tone, A&M
- Formerly of: Soul Asylum

Grant Young (born January 5, 1964) is an American musician who was the drummer for the alternative rock band Soul Asylum from 1984–1995. He replaced Pat Morley shortly after the release of Soul Asylum's debut album, Say What You Will, Clarence...Karl Sold the Truck in 1984. Young's last appearance on a Soul Asylum record album was the breakthrough album, Grave Dancers Union. He was replaced in the middle of the recording sessions by Sterling Campbell, who has also since left the band and is primarily associated with David Bowie, as part of his touring bands.

Young has said that he played on five or six of the songs on the album. He did not, however, record on the band's biggest hit, "Runaway Train" (recorded by Campbell) but did initially play it with Soul Asylum in concerts.

Young was born in Iowa City, Iowa. After his departure from the band, he and his wife Catherine owned and operated a resort in the Boundary Waters region near Ely, Minnesota, close to the Canada–US border.

== Discography with Soul Asylum ==
- Made to Be Broken (Twin/Tone 1986)
- Time's Incinerator (Twin/Tone 1986)
- While You Were Out (Twin/Tone 1986)
- Hang Time (A&M 1988)
- And the Horse They Rode in On (A&M 1990)
- Grave Dancers Union (Columbia 1992)
