= Just Like Anyone =

Just Like Anyone may refer to:

- "Just Like Anyone," a song by Soul Asylum from their 1995 album Let Your Dim Light Shine
- "Just Like Anyone," a song by Aimee Mann from her 2000 album Bachelor No. 2
