= Lap of Luxury (disambiguation) =

Lap of Luxury may refer to:

- Lap of Luxury, a 1988 album by Cheap Trick
- "Lap of Luxury", a song by Soul Asylum from their 1986 album While You Were Out
- "Lap of Luxury", a song by Jethro Tull from their 1984 album Under Wraps
- "Lap of Luxury", a song by Nazareth
- "Lap of Luxury", a song by Oingo Boingo
- "Lap of Luxury", a song by Louie Louie
- "Lap of Luxury", the fictional reality show within The Joe Schmo Show
- "Alone Again in the Lap of Luxury", a song by Marillion from their 1994 album Brave (on some of their live albums titled simply as "Lap of Luxury")
