= The Silver Lining (Soul Asylum album) =

Studio album by Soul Asylum
- Released: July 11, 2006
- Recorded: 2004–2006
- Genre: Alternative rock
- Length: 51:39
- Label: Legacy
- Producer: John Fields, Steve Hodge

Soul Asylum chronology
Closer to the Stars: Best of the Twin/Tone Years (2006)	The Silver Lining (2006)	Welcome to the Minority – The A&M Years 1988–1991 (2007)

Professional ratings
Aggregate scores
Source	Rating
Metacritic	55/100
Review scores
Source	Rating
AllMusic	3/5 stars
Robert Christgau	(choice cut)
E! Online	B
PopMatters	4/10 stars
Rolling Stone	3/5 stars

The Silver Lining is the ninth album by American rock band Soul Asylum. It was released on July 11, 2006, eight years after Candy from a Stranger.

It is the last studio album with original bassist Karl Mueller, who died of cancer on June 17, 2005. Mueller was able to play on most of the tracks, while Tommy Stinson and producer John Fields played some bass guitar for the record.

The single "Stand Up and Be Strong" was chosen by ABC and ESPN for their college football coverage for the 2006–2007 season.

Fellow Minneapolis musician Prince recorded a cover of "Stand Up and Be Strong" in 2010, which was released on his 2021 posthumous record Welcome 2 America.

== Track listing ==
All songs written by Dave Pirner.

1. "Stand Up and Be Strong" – 4:22
2. "Lately" – 3:27
3. "Crazy Mixed Up World" – 3:55
4. "All Is Well" – 3:13
5. "Bus Named Desire" – 3:04
6. "Whatcha Need" – 3:50
7. "Standing Water" – 4:38
8. "Success Is Not So Sweet" – 4:56
9. "The Great Exaggerator" – 4:06
10. "Oxygen" – 4:01
11. "Good for You" – 3:52
12. "Slowly Rising" – 3:55
  "Fearless Leader" (hidden track) – 3:32

== Singles ==
1. "All Is Well"
2. "Stand Up and Be Strong"
3. "Standing Water"
4. "Good for You"

== Charts ==
Chart performance for The Silver Lining
Chart (2006)	Peak position
US Billboard 200	155

== Personnel ==
- Dave Pirner – lead vocals, rhythm guitar
- Dan Murphy – lead guitar, backing vocals
- Karl Mueller – bass
- Michael Bland – drums

Additional personnel

- Tommy Stinson – bass
- John Fields – bass
- Jeff Victor – keyboards
- Joey Huffman – keyboards
