= Say What You Will, Clarence... Karl Sold the Truck =

Say What You Will, Clarence...Karl Sold the Truck

Studio album by Soul Asylum
- Released: 1984
- Recorded: 1981–84
- Genre: Punk rock
- Length: 41:11
- Label: Twin/Tone
- Producer: Bob Mould

Soul Asylum chronology
Say What You Will, Clarence...Karl Sold the Truck (1984)	Made to Be Broken (1986)

Say What You Will... (also known as Say What You Will, Clarence...Karl Sold the Truck and Say What You Will...Anything Can Happen) is the debut studio album by American rock band Soul Asylum, released in 1984 by Twin/Tone Records, and produced by Hüsker Dü's Bob Mould.

== Releases ==
Now out of print, the original version Say What You Will... consisted of nine songs, and sold 6,738 vinyl copies and 2,639 cassettes. The album was reissued under the title Say What You Will, Clarence...Karl Sold the Truck on CD in 1988 with five extra songs that had been cut from the original release. These five had been previously available only on Soul Asylum's rare cassette release, Time's Incinerator (1986). It was then reissued again in 2018 on CD and vinyl, which also included tracks from Soul Asylum's prior band, Loud Fast Rules. The 2018 release was retitled to Say What You Will...Anything Can Happen.

"Karl Sold the Truck" refers to bassist Karl Mueller selling their Chevrolet pickup truck for a larger Dodge van which would be their transportation for their 1984 tour.

Professional ratings
Review scores
Source	Rating
AllMusic	3/5 stars
Spin Alternative Record Guide	7/10

== Track listing ==
All songs written by Dave Pirner.

1. "Draggin' Me Down" – 2:08*
2. "Long Day" – 2:46
3. "Money Talks" – 2:32
4. "Voodoo Doll" – 3:42
5. "Stranger" – 3:44
6. "Do You Know" – 1:54*
7. "Sick of That Song" – 0:52
8. "Religiavision" – 5:09
9. "Spacehead" – 2:08*
10. "Walking" – 2:20
11. "Broken Glass" – 2:23*
12. "Masquerade" – 5:16*
13. "Happy" – 2:45
14. "Black and Blue" – 3:27

Notes:

*: Songs added to the re-release of the album.

== Singles ==
1. "Walking"
2. "Happy"
3. "Religiavision"

== Personnel ==
Soul Asylum

- Pat Morley – drums
- Karl Mueller – bass guitar
- Dan Murphy – guitar, vocals
- Dave Pirner – vocals, guitar, saxophone

Production

- Steve Fjelstad – engineer
- Blake Gumprecht – co-producer
- Bob Mould – producer
- Howie Weinberg – mastering (original edition)
