= After the Flood: Live from the Grand Forks Prom, June 28, 1997 =

Live album by Soul Asylum
- Released: October 5, 2004
- Recorded: June 28, 1997
- Venue: Grand Forks Air Force Base, Emerado, North Dakota
- Genre: Alternative rock
- Length: 69:50
- Label: Columbia/Legacy
- Producer: Jeff Magrid

Soul Asylum chronology
Black Gold: The Best of Soul Asylum (2000)	After the Flood: Live from the Grand Forks Prom, June 28, 1997 (2004)	Closer to the Stars: Best of the Twin/Tone Years (2006)

Professional ratings
Review scores
Source	Rating
Allmusic	3.5/5 stars

After the Flood: Live from the Grand Forks Prom, June 28, 1997 is the second live album released by Soul Asylum. It was recorded on June 28, 1997, about two months after the Red River Flood of 1997 hit the city of Grand Forks, North Dakota. Soul Asylum played the concert for the joint prom of the local high schools. The event took place in one of the hangars at nearby Grand Forks Air Force Base. The image of the burnt out downtown Security Building taken by Eric Hylden for the Grand Forks Herald is shown on the back cover of the album.

== Track listing ==
1. "School's Out" (Bruce, Buxton, Cooper, Dunaway, Smith) – 3:54
2. "Misery" (Pirner) – 3:45
3. "Black Gold" (Pirner) – 3:36
4. "See You Later" (Pirner) – 4:38
5. "Without a Trace" (Pirner) – 3:19
6. "Losin' it" (Pirner) – 3:02
7. "Somebody to Shove" (Pirner) – 3:25
8. "Just Like Anyone" (Pirner) – 2:47
9. "The Tracks of My Tears" (Moore, Robinson, Tarplin) – 3:02
10. "Runaway Train" (Pirner) – 4:34
11. "We 3" (Pirner) – 4:03
12. "I Know" (Davis, DuVall) – 3:22
13. "Sexual Healing" (Brown, Gaye, Ritz) – 4:43
14. "The Game" (Pirner) – 4:35
15. "I Can See Clearly Now" (Nash) – 2:53
16. "Black Star" (Pirner) – 3:20
17. "To Sir, with Love" (Black, London) – 2:48
18. "Rhinestone Cowboy" (Weiss) – 4:53
