= Made to Be Broken =

Studio album by Soul Asylum
- Released: January 18, 1986
- Recorded: 1985
- Genres: Punk rock, alternative rock
- Length: 33:31
- Label: Twin/Tone
- Producer: Bob Mould

Soul Asylum chronology
Say What You Will, Clarence...Karl Sold the Truck (1984)	Made to Be Broken (1986)	Time's Incinerator (1986)

Made to Be Broken is the second full-length album by Soul Asylum. It was released on January 18, 1986. It was the first of the three albums released by Soul Asylum in 1986.

The song "Never Really Been" contains the line "And where will you be in 1993." The band performed the song on their 1993 appearance on MTV Unplugged, by which time they'd seen their first platinum-selling album and number one single.

== Critical reception ==
Professional ratings
Review scores
Source	Rating
AllMusic	3.5/5 stars
Robert Christgau	B
The Encyclopedia of Popular Music	3/5 stars
MusicHound Rock: The Essential Album Guide	4/5 stars
Q	3/5 stars
The Rolling Stone Album Guide	3/5 stars
Spin Alternative Record Guide	8/10

Trouser Press called the album "an essential Soul Asylum LP," writing that "raging dual vocals and interwoven guitar work by Pirner and Dan Murphy, supported by new arrival Grant Young’s precise, varied drumming, make the tuneful power of 'Tied to the Tracks,' 'Ship of Fools,' 'New Feelings' and the countryish title track shatteringly original." The Spin Alternative Record Guide wrote that "[Dave] Pirner's punch-drunk, night-stand poetry took on real power when framed by new drummer Grant Young's off-kilter, rhythmic swerve and guitarist Dan Murphy's dual vocals."

In a retrospective review, Stylus Magazine wrote that Made to Be Broken "taps into a potent spirit of underdog defeatism; it’s the sound of watching the tour bus through the window of the cramped van, gazing at the hotel en route to the fan’s couch or floor, and imagining a bath while showering in a sink."

== Track listing ==
All songs written by David Pirner, unless otherwise noted.

1. "Tied to the Tracks" – 2:45
2. "Ship of Fools" – 2:48
3. "Can't Go Back" — (Dan Murphy) – 3:05
4. "Another World, Another Day" – 1:59
5. "Made to Be Broken" – 2:35
6. "Never Really Been" – 2:52
7. "Whoa!" – 2:32
8. "New Feelings" – 1:46
9. "Growing Pain" – 2:17
10. "Long Way Home" – 2:27
11. "Lone Rider" – 1:50
12. "Ain't That Tough" – 3:34
13. "Don't It (Make Your Troubles Seem Small)" – 2:48

== Personnel ==
- Dave Pirner – lead vocals, guitars, piano, saxophone
- Dan Murphy – guitars, backing vocals; lead vocals on "Can't Go Back"
- Karl Mueller – bass
- Grant Young – drums

== Singles ==
1. "Never Really Been"
2. "Tied to the Tracks"
3. "Made to Be Broken"
