= Hopes Up =

Hopes Up may refer to:

- "I Won't", a song by Soul Asylum from the 1995 album Let Your Dim Light Shine
- "Hopes Up", a song by H.E.R. from her 2017 self-titled album
