= Hurry Up and Wait =

Hurry Up and Wait may refer to:

- Hurry up and wait, an English-language expression
- Hurry Up and Wait (Joe Lynn Turner album), 1998
- Hurry Up and Wait (Riddlin' Kids album), 2002
- Hurry Up and Wait (Dune Rats album), 2020
- Hurry Up and Wait (Soul Asylum album), 2020
- "Hurry Up and Wait" (song), a 1999 song by Stereophonics
- Hurry Up and Wait (Soul Asylum album), 2020
- "Hurry Up and Wait", a 2004 song by Pitbull from M.I.A.M.I.
