= Candy from a Stranger =

Studio album by Soul Asylum
- Released: May 12, 1998
- Recorded: 1997–1998
- Genre: Alternative rock
- Length: 45:17
- Label: Columbia
- Producer: Chris Kimsey

Soul Asylum chronology
Let Your Dim Light Shine (1995)	Candy from a Stranger (1998)	Black Gold: The Best of Soul Asylum (2000)

Singles from Candy from a Stranger
- 1. "I Will Still Be Laughing" Released: 1998

Professional ratings
Review scores
Source	Rating
AllMusic	2.5/5 stars
Chicago Tribune	2/4 stars
Christgau's Consumer Guide	(dud)
Entertainment Weekly	B−
Pitchfork	2.5/10
NME	5/10
Rolling Stone	2.5/5 stars
Spin	5/10

Candy from a Stranger is Soul Asylum's eighth studio album. It was released on May 12, 1998 (see 1998 in music). It follows 1995's Let Your Dim Light Shine.

"I Will Still Be Laughing" achieved fame after it was featured in the closing credits of the 1998 comedy BASEketball. It is also the band's last single to date to appear on Billboard's Modern Rock and Mainstream Rock charts.

== Track listing ==
All songs written by Dave Pirner except as noted.

1. "Creatures of Habit" – 3:23
2. "I Will Still Be Laughing" – 3:46
3. "Close" – 4:33
4. "See You Later" – 4:46
5. "No Time for Waiting" – 3:16
6. "Blood into Wine" (Dan Murphy, Elizabeth Herman) – 4:03
7. "Lies of Hate" (Dave Pirner, Sterling Campbell) – 4:39
8. "Draggin' the Lake" – 3:38
9. "New York Blackout" – 4:05
10. "The Game" – 4:27
11. "Cradle Chain" – 4:45
12. "Losin' It" (bonus track on the Japanese edition)

== Singles ==
1. "I Will Still Be Laughing"
2. "Close"

== Charts ==
Album - Billboard (United States)

Year	Chart	Position
1998	The Billboard 200	121

Singles - Billboard (United States)

Year	Single	Chart	Position
1998	"I Will Still Be Laughing"	Mainstream Rock Tracks	23
1998	"I Will Still Be Laughing"	Modern Rock Tracks	24

== Band members ==
- Dave Pirner – lead vocals, rhythm guitar
- Dan Murphy – lead guitar, backing vocals
- Karl Mueller – bass
- Sterling Campbell – drums
