= Faces & Names =

Studio album by Dave Pirner
- Released: 30 July 2002
- Recorded: 2001–2002
- Genre: Pop rock
- Length: 42:31
- Label: Ultimatum Music
- Producer: Dave Pirner; Mike Napolitano tracks 3–11; David Gamson, Oliver Leiber tracks 1–2

Professional ratings
Review scores
Source	Rating
AllMusic	4/5 stars
Rolling Stone	3/5 stars

Faces & Names is Dave Pirner's first solo studio album. It was released in the United States on 30 July 2002.

== Track listing ==
All songs written by Dave Pirner.

1. "Teach Me To Breathe" – 3:46
2. "Never Recover" – 3:45
3. "Faces & Names" – 4:21
4. "Feel the Need" – 4:01
5. "Someday Love" – 3:49
6. "364" – 4:06
7. "I'll Have My Day" – 4:21
8. "Tea" – 3:33
9. "Much Too Easy" – 3:39
10. "Levitation" – 3:26
11. "Start Treating People Right" – 3:55

== Personnel ==
- Dave Pirner - vocals, guitar, trumpet
- Pat Sansone - keyboards, guitar, backing vocals
- Anthony Tidd - bass
- Chris Joyner - organ, piano
- Ian Mussington - drums, percussion, backing vocals
- Sophia Jones - backing vocals
- Oliver Leiber - guitar, bass, drums on "Teach Me to Breathe" and "Never Recover"
- Mark Brown - bass on "Never Recover"
- Billy Preston - organ, Wurlitzer on "Never Recover"
- Chris Whitley - dobro on "Faces & Names" and "Start Treating People Right"
- Brady Kish - double bass on "Faces & Names"
- Kraig Jarret Johnson - guitar on "Someday Love"
- Mike Napolitano - guitar on "Tea" and "Levitation"
- Michael Blum - pedal steel on "Much Too Easy"
- Eric "Skerik" Walton - tenor saxophone on "Levitation"

== Singles ==
1. "Tea"
2. "Levitation"
3. "Feel the Need"
