= Time's Incinerator =

- Photo by: David Pirner

Compilation album by Soul Asylum
- Released: June 24, 1986
- Recorded: 1980–86
- Genre: Alternative rock
- Length: 53:46
- Label: Twin/Tone
- Producer: Bob Mould, Soul Asylum

Soul Asylum chronology
Made to Be Broken (1986)	Time's Incinerator (1986)	While You Were Out (1986)

Time's Incinerator is a compilation released by Soul Asylum in 1986. It is a rare cassette-only release which contains b-sides, outtakes and demos from the Soul Asylum and the former Loud Fast Rules days.

The album name comes from Soul Asylum's song "Can't Go Back" from the album Made To Be Broken, where the lyrics are "fifteen years later caught in time's incinerator... yesterday's worries are today's".

The five songs (denoted with a star) were outtakes from their 1984 debut album, Say What You Will... Everything Can Happen. These songs eventually made it to the 1988 CD release (and rerelease) of the album, which was titled, Say What You Will, Clarence...Karl Sold the Truck.

The final song on side two is an improvised live track by Madison, WI Hardcore band Mecht Mensch during equipment troubles at a shared gig.

Professional ratings
Review scores
Source	Rating
Allmusic	link
Spin Alternative Record Guide	5/10

== Track listing ==
Side one

1. "Dragging Me Down"*
2. "Freeway"
3. "Broken Glass"*
4. "Goin' Down"
5. "The Snake"
6. "Hot Pants"
7. "Job for Me"
8. "Swingin'"
9. "Take It to the Root" (later on Clam Dip & Other Delights, released in 1989)
10. "Fearless"

Side two

1. "Do You Know"*
2. "Spacehead"*
3. "Cocaine Blues"
4. "Out of Style"
5. "Nowhere to Go"
6. "Hey Bird"
7. "Friends"
8. "Ramblin' Rose"
9. "Your Clock"
10. "Masquerade"*
11. "Soul Asylum"

== Singles ==
1. "Cocaine Blues"
2. "Freeway"
3. "Your Clock"
4. "Goin' Down"
5. "Job for Me"
