= Let Your Dim Light Shine =

Studio album by Soul Asylum
- Released: June 6, 1995
- Recorded: 1994–1995
- Studios: Smart (Madison, Wisconsin)
- Genre: Alternative rock
- Length: 49:59
- Label: Columbia
- Producers: Butch Vig; Soul Asylum

Soul Asylum chronology
Grave Dancers Union (1992)	Let Your Dim Light Shine (1995)	Candy from a Stranger (1998)

Singles from Let Your Dim Light Shine
- 1. "Misery" Released: May 15, 1995; 2. "Just Like Anyone" Released: November 20, 1995 (UK); 3. "Promises Broken" Released: 1995

Let Your Dim Light Shine is the seventh studio album by American rock band Soul Asylum, released June 6, 1995, on Columbia Records. Critically, it suffered in comparison to its predecessor, Grave Dancers Union, the band's breakout release. It includes the hit "Misery", which was parodied by "Weird Al" Yankovic as "Syndicated Inc." on his album Bad Hair Day.

It was the first Soul Asylum album with drummer Sterling Campbell, who had previously played drums on half of the tracks on Grave Dancers Union.

The album's title comes from a lyric of the song "Promises Broken".

== Reception ==
Professional ratings
Review scores
Source	Rating
AllMusic	2/5 stars
Chicago Tribune	2.5/4 stars
Christgau's Consumer Guide	B+
Entertainment Weekly	B
Los Angeles Times	2.5/4 stars
Q	4/5 stars
Rolling Stone	4/5 stars
Spin	7/10

AllMusic gave a mostly critical summary of Let Your Dim Light Shine, with Stephen Thomas Erlewine commenting that the music "isn't quite as impressive" compared to previous efforts, and moreover that this element is easily overlooked because of the "self-importance" of the lyrics.

== Track listing ==
All songs written by David Pirner unless noted otherwise.

1. "Misery" – 4:24
2. "Shut Down" – 2:51
3. "To My Own Devices" – 2:59
4. "Hopes Up" – 3:45
5. "Promises Broken" (Dan Murphy, Marc Perlman) – 3:14
6. "Bittersweetheart" – 3:34
7. "String of Pearls" – 4:56
8. "Crawl" (Stephen Jordan, Pirner) – 4:00
9. "Caged Rat" – 3:03
10. "Eyes of a Child" – 3:35
11. "Just Like Anyone" – 2:47
12. "Tell Me When" (Pirner, David Samuels) – 3:42
13. "Nothing to Write Home About" – 3:14
14. "I Did My Best" – 3:46

For the Japanese release of Let Your Dim Light Shine, an additional track was added to the album. It was a cover of the Descendents song "Hope". Note that "Bittersweetheart" fades out at 3:17, but the guitar feedback remains, therefore "Bittersweetheart" quickly segues into "String of Pearls". The running time of both songs equals about 8 minutes and 30 seconds long.

== Personnel ==
Soul Asylum

- Dave Pirner – lead vocals, rhythm guitar, keyboards, trumpet, producer
- Dan Murphy – lead guitar, backing vocals, producer
- Karl Mueller – bass guitar, producer
- Sterling Campbell – drums, percussion, vocals, producer

Additional musicians

- Trini Alvarado – backing vocals
- John Devries – backing vocals
- Joey Huffman – organ, piano, mellotron
- Eric Pierson – guitar (on "Hopes Up", and "Caged Rat")
- Jane Scarpantoni – cello
- Dave Schramm – pedal steel guitar (on "I Did My Best")
- Tim Ray – piano, electric piano

Production

- John Siket – engineer
- Michael Stern – engineer (non credited)
- Butch Vig – producer
- Andy Wallace – mixer
- Howie Weinberg – mastering

== Charts ==
=== Weekly charts ===
Weekly chart performance for Let Your Dim Light Shine
Chart (1995)	Peak position
Australian Albums (ARIA)	27
Austrian Albums (Ö3 Austria)	21
Belgian Albums (Ultratop Flanders)	45
Canada Top Albums/CDs (RPM)	6
Dutch Albums (Album Top 100)	73
Finnish Albums (Suomen virallinen lista)	23
German Albums (Offizielle Top 100)	32
New Zealand Albums (RMNZ)	8
Scottish Albums (Official Charts)	27
Swedish Albums (Sverigetopplistan)	37
Swiss Albums (Schweizer Hitparade)	23
UK Albums (Official Charts)	22
US Billboard 200	6

=== Year-end charts ===
Year-end chart performance for Let Your Dim Light Shine
Chart (1995)	Position
US Billboard 200	97

=== Singles ===
Chart performance for singles from Let Your Dim Light Shine
Year	Single	Chart	Position
1995	"Misery"	US Billboard Hot 100	20
1995	"Misery"	US Mainstream Rock Tracks	2
1995	"Misery"	US Modern Rock Tracks	1
1995	"Just Like Anyone"	US Mainstream Rock Tracks	11
1995	"Just Like Anyone"	US Modern Rock Tracks	19
1996	"Promises Broken"	US Billboard Hot 100	63
1996	"Promises Broken"	US Mainstream Rock Tracks	29
1996	"Promises Broken"	US Adult Contemporary	29

== Certifications ==
Certifications for Let Your Dim Light Shine
Region	Certification	Certified units/sales
Canada (Music Canada)	2× Platinum	200,000^{^}
United States (RIAA)	Platinum	1,000,000^{^}
^{^} Shipments figures based on certification alone.
