= Change of Fortune =

Studio album by Soul Asylum
- Released: March 18, 2016
- Recorded: 2014
- Genre: Alternative rock
- Length: 39:25
- Label: Entertainment One
- Producer: John Fields, Soul Asylum

Soul Asylum chronology
Delayed Reaction (2012)	Change of Fortune (2016)	Hurry Up and Wait (2020)

Professional ratings
Review scores
Source	Rating
AllMusic	2.5/5 stars

Change of Fortune is the eleventh studio album by Soul Asylum. It is the follow-up to their 2012 album Delayed Reaction. It was released on March 18, 2016. It is their first album released on Entertainment One.

== Track listing ==
All tracks are written by Dave Pirner.

Change of Fortune track listing
No.	Title	Length
1.	"Supersonic"	3:01
2.	"Can't Help It"	3:01
3.	"Doomsday"	2:59
4.	"Ladies Man"	3:23
5.	"Moonshine"	4:03
6.	"Make it Real"	2:19
7.	"When I See You"	3:47
8.	"Dealing"	4:05
9.	"Don't Bother Me"	3:28
10.	"Morgan's Dog"	3:36
11.	"Change of Fortune"	2:56
12.	"Cool"	2:55

== Band members ==
- Dave Pirner – lead vocals, rhythm guitar
- Justin Sharbono – lead guitar, backing vocals
- Winston Roye – bass
- Michael Bland – drums
