= Just Like Anyone (song) =

1995 single by Soul Asylum

Single by Soul Asylum

from the album Let Your Dim Light Shine
- B-side: "Fearless Leader"; "You'll Live For Now"
- Released: November 20, 1995
- Length: 2:47
- Label: Columbia
- Songwriter: Dave Pirner
- Producers: Butch Vig; Soul Asylum

Soul Asylum singles chronology
"Misery" (1995)	"Just Like Anyone" (1995)	"Promises Broken" (1996)

"Just Like Anyone" is a 1995 song by American alternative rock band Soul Asylum from its seventh album, Let Your Dim Light Shine. Written by the lead singer, Dave Pirner, and produced by the band with Butch Vig, the song was the second single released as the album. It entered the singles charts in Canada and the United Kingdom and reached number 19 on the US Billboard Modern Rock Tracks chart. The song was included on the band's 2000 greatest hits album, Black Gold: The Best of Soul Asylum, and a live version appears on the band's 2004 After the Flood: Live from the Grand Forks Prom, June 28, 1997 album.

== Reception ==
"Just Like Anyone" peaked at number 52 in the United Kingdom and number 55 in Canada, where it also reached number 12 on the Alternative chart. In the United States, the song was not released as a commercial single, but it received enough radio airplay to peak at number 11 on the Billboard Album Rock Tracks chart and number 19 on the Modern Rock Tracks chart.

The New York Times music critic, Jon Pareles, said the song's lyrics "could have been written for the insecure high school students in the television drama My So-Called Life," in which Danes also starred.

== Music video ==
A music video for the song was filmed in Los Angeles during summer 1995. Directed by P. J. Hogan and produced by Michelle Alexander, the video features the actress Claire Danes, who plays a high school student who is rejected and taunted by other students because she has two noticeable bumps on her back. Hidden beneath the bumps are angel wings, which are revealed later as she takes flight during a school dance. The video was shown on MTV and MuchMusic, reaching the most-played charts on both networks.

== Track listings ==
CD1

1. "Just Like Anyone"
2. "Get On Out" (live at Paradise Rock Club, June 4, 1995)
3. "Do Anything You Wanna Do"

CD2

1. "Just Like Anyone"
2. "Fearless Leader"
3. "You'll Leave For Now"

== Charts ==
Chart (1995)	Peak position
Australia (ARIA)	114
Canada Top Singles (RPM)	54
Canada Rock/Alternative (RPM)	12
Scottish Singles Sales (Official Charts)	52
UK Singles (Official Charts)	52
UK Rock & Metal (Official Charts)	2
US Alternative Airplay (Billboard)	19
US Mainstream Rock (Billboard)	11

== Release history ==
Region	Date	Format(s)	Label(s)	Ref.
United States	1995	Radio	Columbia	
United Kingdom	November 20, 1995	CD; cassette	Columbia	
