= And the Horse They Rode In On =

Studio album by Soul Asylum
- Released: September 4, 1990
- Recorded: 1990
- Genre: Alternative rock
- Length: 42:14
- Label: A&M
- Producer: Steve Jordan

Soul Asylum chronology
Clam Dip & Other Delights (1989)	And the Horse They Rode In On (1990)	Grave Dancers Union (1992)

Singles from And the Horse They Rode In On
- 1. "Spinnin" Released: 1990; 2. "Easy Street" Released: 1990

And the Horse They Rode In On is the fifth full-length album by the American rock band Soul Asylum, released on A&M Records in 1990. The vinyl, cassette, and CD versions of the album have different, but related, cover art. The band supported the album with a North American tour. The first single was "Spinnin'".

== Production ==
The album was produced by Steve Jordan. The majority of it was recorded live on an A&M sound stage in Los Angeles, and finished in Cannon Falls. The band decided to record what they felt like, rather than worry about a consistent style. Soul Asylum spent so much time recording that they collected several outtakes. "We 3" is about an eternal triangle. "Nice Guys (Don't Get Paid)" is about drug dealing.

== Critical reception ==
Professional ratings
Review scores
Source	Rating
AllMusic	3/5 stars
Robert Christgau	(dud)
Entertainment Weekly	A−
Orlando Sentinel	4/5 stars
Q	3/5 stars
Rolling Stone	3.5/5 stars
Spin Alternative Record Guide	6/10
Vancouver Sun	4.5/5 stars
Windsor Star	B+

The Windsor Star wrote that "'Gullible's Travels' is one of the best half-dozen rock tracks of the year." The Vancouver Sun determined that Soul Asylum "have channelled their hardcore angst and drunkards-on-skateboards mentality into some of the freshest and most melodic songwriting around."

The Dallas Morning News stated that the band "maintains its tradition of combining tightly flexed funk rhythms, sharp melodies, raggedly tuneful guitars and rough, passionate vocals." The Richmond Times-Dispatch noted that "All the King's Friends" "impressively welds a '60s-sounding rock melody to an almost speed-metal structure."

== Track listing ==
All songs written by Dave Pirner unless otherwise noted.

1. "Spinnin'" – 2:37
2. "Bitter Pill" – 2:49
3. "Veil of Tears" – 4:06
4. "Nice Guys (Don't Get Paid)" – 4:45
5. "Something Out of Nothing" – 3:15
6. "Gullible's Travels" – 4:18 (Murphy)
7. "Brand New Shine" – 3:15
8. "Easy Street" – 3:34 (Pirner, Murphy)
9. "Grounded" – 3:17
10. "Be on Your Way" – 3:01
11. "We 3" – 4:08
12. "All the King's Friends" – 3:09

== Singles ==
1. "Brand New Shine"
2. "Easy Street"
3. "Veil of Tears"
4. "Nice Guys (Don't Get Paid)"
