= Hurry Up and Wait (Soul Asylum album) =

Studio album by Soul Asylum
- Released: April 17, 2020
- Studio: Nicollet Studios, Minneapolis, Minnesota, US
- Genre: Alternative rock
- Language: English
- Label: Blue Élan
- Producer: John Fields; Dave Pirner

Soul Asylum chronology
| Change of Fortune (2016) | Hurry Up and Wait (2020) | Slowly But Shirley (2024) |

Soul Asylum, first and foremost, is a guitar band. The drums on the records have never been particularly flashy. I think part of that has to do with the fact that Dave plays drums as well. His choices are clear and informed, when he’s asking me to do, or not do something. Dave likes it to be kept pretty straightforward. So I generally go with the simplest of choices, and try not to grandstand or bring unnecessary attention to what I’m doing.

—Drummer Michael Bland on Soul Asylum's approach to recording.

Hurry Up and Wait is the twelfth studio album by American alternative rock band Soul Asylum, released in 2020.

== Recording, release, and promotion ==
This music represents the first work by Soul Asylum frontman Dave Pirner since his divorce and moving back to Minnesota from several years living in New Orleans and these songs were a spontaneous response to these life events. The album's lyrics explore Pirner's emotions and also mundane life.

The album was preceded by the single "Social Butterfly", a song that explores Pirner's attempts to develop a social life after the end of his marriage, and was supported by a concert tour.

== Reception ==
Editors at AllMusic rated this album 3.5 out of 5 stars, with critic Mark Deming writing that this release shows the evolution of songwriter Dave Pirner, with his "more pensive and introspective side" displayed in the music and that he "handl[es] maturity better than the average rock dude in deep middle age". Jeremy Lukens of Glide Magazine wrote that this album is "a good representation of frontman Dave Pirner’s vision" for matching "the band’s heavier aspects with intricate melodies and hummable vocals". Dana Miller of QRO Magazine praised the album's songwriting and emotional depth, highlighting Pirner's lyricism and describing Hurry Up and Wait as one of the richest releases of the year.

== Track listing ==
All songs written by Dave Pirner.

1. "The Beginning" – 3:55
2. "If I Told You" – 3:51
3. "Got It Pretty Good" – 3:16
4. "Make Her Laugh" – 4:03
5. "Busy Signals" – 2:54
6. "Social Butterfly" – 3:52
7. "Dead Letter" – 3:05
8. "Landmines" – 3:14
9. "Here We Go" – 3:05
10. "Freezer Burn" – 3:26
11. "Silent Treatment" – 4:02
12. "Hopped Up Feelin'" – 3:22
13. "Silly Things" – 3:51

== Personnel ==
Soul Asylum

- Michael Bland – drums; backing vocals on "Got It Pretty Good", "Make Her Laugh", "Silent Treatment", and "Hopped Up Feelin'"; percussion on "Freezer Burn"; additional recording at Sonic Matrimony; additional engineering at Sonic Matrimony
- Dave Pirner – guitar, vocals, trumpet on "The Beginning", percussion on "Busy Signals", piano on "Freezer Burn", bass guitar bridge on "Hopped Up Feelin'", recording, engineering, production, art direction, design, illustration, photography
- Winston Roye – bass guitar on "The Beginning", "If I Told You", "Make Her Laugh", "Social Butterfly", "Dead Letter", "Here We Go", "Hopped Up Feelin'", and ""Silly Things"; additional recording at Leisuretowne Studios; additional engineering at Leisuretowne Studios
- Ryan Smith – lead guitar, backing vocals

Additional personnel

- Chris Allgood – mastering at The Lodge
- Jeneen Anderson – backing vocals on "Got It Pretty Good", additional design, layout, photography
- John Fields – percussion on "The Beginning", "If I Told You", "Social Butterfly", "Here We Go", and "Hopped Up Feelin'"; keyboards on "If I Told You", "Here We Go", "Silent Treatment", and "Silly Things"; guitar on "If I Told You"; Wurlitzer electric piano on "Make Her Laugh"; Arp SE-IV String Ensemble synthesizer on "Busy Signals"; accordion on "Dead Letter"; backing vocals on "Here We Go"; recording; mixing; production
- Paul David Hager – mixing
- Vito Ingerto – photography
- Michelle Kinney – cello on "If I Told You", "Social Butterfly", and "Silent Treatment"
- Emily Lazar – mastering
- Paul Moore – additional design, layout, photography
- George Ortolano – additional recording at Stealth, additional engineering at Stealth
- Ryan Smith – additional recording at Flight Simulator, additional engineering at Flight Simulator, photography
- Pete Suttman – backing vocals on "Got It Pretty Good"
- Jeremy Tappero – bass guitar on "Got It Pretty Good", "Make Her Laugh", "Busy Signals", "Landmines", "Freezer Burn", and "Silent Treatment"; percussion on "Got It Pretty Good", "Make Her Laugh", "Silent Treatment", and "Silly Things"; vocals on "Got It Pretty Good", "Make Her Laugh", "Here We Go", and "Hopped Up Feelin'"; additional recording at Noise Below; additional engineering at Noise Below

== See also ==
- List of 2020 albums
