= Clam Dip & Other Delights =

EP by Soul Asylum
- Released: April 14, 1989
- Recorded: 1987–1988
- Genre: Alternative rock
- Length: 18:49
- Label: Twin/Tone
- Producer: Soul Asylum, Tom Herbers

Soul Asylum chronology
Hang Time (1988)	Clam Dip & Other Delights (1989)	And the Horse They Rode in On (1990)

Professional ratings
Review scores
Source	Rating
AllMusic	4/5 stars
Q	4/5 stars
Spin Alternative Record Guide	5/10

Clam Dip & Other Delights is a 1989 EP by the Minneapolis band Soul Asylum. The title and cover art are parodies of Herb Alpert and the Tijuana Brass's album Whipped Cream & Other Delights. It was a humorous nod to their new record label, A&M (the "A" standing for "Alpert"). Bassist Karl Mueller sat in for the original album's model, Dolores Erickson. Dave Ayers, the band's first manager, said that Mueller had to sit for hours in a foul-smelling combination of sour cream, paint, whipped cream and seafood. Also, the album makes fun of the A&M logo being under the title of the album, incorporating the Twin/Tone Records logo instead.

The EP originally was released in Britain featuring three covers: Foreigner's "Juke Box Hero," Janis Joplin's "Move Over" and "Chains," by an obscure Minneapolis group called the Wad. Only "Chains" was included on the American release.

The song "P-9" was written to benefit striking Hormel workers in Austin, Minnesota.

It is currently in print on Rykodisc Records.

== Track listing ==
1. "Just Plain Evil" – 3:01
2. "Chains" – 3:18
3. "Secret No More" – 2:43
4. "Artificial Heart" – 3:37
5. "P-9" – 2:32
6. "Take It to the Root" – 3:38
