= Hang Time (album) =

Studio album by Soul Asylum
- Released: 1988
- Recorded: 1988
- Genre: Alternative rock
- Length: 39:13
- Label: A&M
- Producer: Lenny Kaye, Ed Stasium

Soul Asylum chronology
While You Were Out (1986)	Hang Time (1988)	Clam Dip & Other Delights (1989)

Professional ratings
Review scores
Source	Rating
AllMusic	4/5 stars
Robert Christgau	B−
Q	4/5 stars
Rolling Stone	4/5 stars
Spin Alternative Record Guide	5/10

Hang Time is the fourth full-length studio album by the American rock band Soul Asylum. Released in 1988 by A&M Records, the album was the band's debut for a major label.

Singer/guitarist Dave Pirner wrote the majority of the album. Guitarist Dan Murphy chimed in with "Cartoon," released as one of the album's singles. The CD version features the "bone-us" (bonus) track "Put the Bone In", by Terry Jacks.

== Track listing ==
All songs written by Dave Pirner unless otherwise noted.

1. "Down On Up to Me" – 2:46
2. "Little Too Clean" – 3:15
3. "Sometime to Return" – 3:28
4. "Cartoon" – 3:52 (Murphy)
5. "Beggars and Choosers" – 2:57
6. "Endless Farewell" – 3:21
7. "Standing in the Doorway" – 3:06
8. "Marionette" – 3:24
9. "Ode" – 2:18
10. "Jack of All Trades" – 2:53
11. "Twiddly Dee" – 3:00
12. "Heavy Rotation" – 3:54
13. "Put the Bone In" – 3:34 (bone-us track, CD Only) (Terry Jacks)

== Singles ==
1. "Marionette"
2. "Little Too Clean"
3. "Cartoon"
