= Somebody to Shove =

1992 single by Soul Asylum

Single by Soul Asylum

from the album Grave Dancers Union
- B-side: "By the Way" (demo)
- Released: 1992
- Genre: Alternative rock; garage rock; hard rock; power pop
- Length: 3:15
- Label: Columbia
- Songwriter: Dave Pirner
- Producer: Michael Beinhorn

Soul Asylum singles chronology
"Easy Street" (1990)	"Somebody to Shove" (1992)	"Black Gold" (1993)

"Somebody to Shove" is a song by American alternative rock band Soul Asylum, released in 1992. The song was written by Soul Asylum's lead singer, Dave Pirner. It was the first single from their sixth studio album, Grave Dancers Union (1992). It reached number one on the US Billboard Modern Rock Tracks chart and number nine on the Billboard Album Rock Tracks chart. The music video for the song was directed by American filmmaker Zack Snyder, who also directed the "Black Gold" videoclip.

== Style ==
Musically the song is an alternative rock, garage rock, hard rock, post-grunge, and power pop song.

== Track listings ==
UK CD single

1. "Somebody to Shove"
2. "Somebody to Shove" (unplugged)
3. "Stranger" (unplugged)
4. "Without a Trace" (live)

UK 7-inch and cassette single

A. "Somebody to Shove" – 3:15
B. "By the Way" (demo) – 3:44

UK 12-inch single

1. "Somebody to Shove" – 3:15
2. "By the Way" (demo) – 3:45
3. "Somebody to Shove" (live version) – 3:17
4. "Runaway Train" (live version) – 4:11

== Charts ==
Chart (1992–1994)	Peak position
Australia (ARIA)	123
Scotland Singles (OCC)	34
UK Singles (OCC)	32
US Alternative Airplay (Billboard)	1
US Mainstream Rock (Billboard)	9

== Release history ==
Region	Date	Format(s)	Ref.
Australia	February 28, 1993	CD; cassette	
United Kingdom	August 23, 1993	12-inch vinyl; CD; cassette	

== Other versions ==
An acoustic version of the song was include as a track on The Unplugged Collection, Volume One.

== See also ==
- List of Billboard Modern Rock Tracks number ones of the 1990s
