= Misery (Soul Asylum song) =

1995 single by Soul Asylum

Single by Soul Asylum

from the album Let Your Dim Light Shine
- B-side: "Hope"; "Fearless Leader"; "You'll Live for Now"; "Summer of Drugs"
- Released: May 15, 1995
- Genre: Alternative rock
- Length: 4:24
- Label: Columbia
- Songwriter: Dave Pirner
- Producers: Butch Vig; Soul Asylum

Soul Asylum singles chronology
"Summer of Drugs" (1994)	"Misery" (1995)	"Just Like Anyone" (1995)

"Misery" is a song by Minneapolis rock band Soul Asylum, released as the lead single from their seventh studio album, Let Your Dim Light Shine (1995). The track was serviced to US alternative radio in May 1995 and was later issued as a commercial single. "Misery" reached number 20 on the US Billboard Hot 100, number one on the Billboard Modern Rock Tracks chart, and number three in Canada.

== Music video ==
The music video for "Misery", directed by Matt Mahurin, features footage of the band performing onstage intercut with shots of a record plant pressing copies of the "Misery" CD single itself.

== Track listings ==
- US 7-inch, CD, and cassette single
1. "Misery"
2. "Hope"
- US and Canadian maxi-CD single
1. "Misery" – 4:24
2. "Hope" – 2:06
3. "Fearless Leader" – 5:28
4. "You'll Live for Now" – 3:12
5. "Summer of Drugs" – 4:06
- Australian CD and cassette single
1. "Misery" (edit)
2. "String of Pearls"
3. "Misery"
- UK 7-inch and cassette single; European CD single
1. "Misery"
2. "String of Pearls"
- UK CD single
1. "Misery"
2. "String of Pearls"
3. "Hope"
4. "I Did My Best"
- European maxi-CD single
1. "Misery"
2. "String of Pearls"
3. "Caged Rat"
4. "I Did My Best"
- Japanese CD single
1. "Misery" (edit)
2. "Summer of Drugs"
3. "Misery" (live version)

== Charts ==
=== Weekly charts ===
Weekly chart performance for "Misery"
Chart (1995)	Peak position
Australia (ARIA)	22
Canada Top Singles (RPM)	3
Canada Rock/Alternative (RPM)	1
Europe (European Hit Radio)	11
Germany (GfK)	75
Italy Airplay (Music & Media)	7
New Zealand (Recorded Music NZ)	21
Scottish Singles Sales (Official Charts)	31
UK Singles (Official Charts)	30
US Billboard Hot 100	20
US Alternative Airplay (Billboard)	1
US Mainstream Rock (Billboard)	2
US Pop Airplay (Billboard)	13

=== Year-end charts ===
Year-end chart performance for "Misery"
Chart (1995)	Position
Canada Top Singles (RPM)	16
Canada Rock/Alternative (RPM)	3
US Billboard Hot 100	99
US Album Rock Tracks (Billboard)	13
US Modern Rock Tracks (Billboard)	28

== Release history ==
Release dates and formats for "Misery"
Region	Date	Format(s)	Label(s)	Ref.
United States	May 15, 1995	Alternative radio	Columbia	
Australia	June 12, 1995	CD; cassette	Columbia	
United Kingdom	July 3, 1995	7-inch vinyl; CD; cassette	Columbia	
Japan	August 19, 1995	CD	Sony	

== See also ==
- Number one modern rock hits of 1995
- List of RPM Rock/Alternative number-one singles (Canada)
