= While You Were Out (album) =

Studio album by Soul Asylum
- Released: 1986
- Recorded: 1986
- Genre: Rock
- Length: 33:34
- Label: Twin/Tone
- Producer: Chris Osgood

Soul Asylum chronology
Time's Incinerator (1986)	While You Were Out (1986)	Hang Time (1988)

While You Were Out is the third full-length studio album by the American band Soul Asylum, released in 1986. It was produced by Chris Osgood. While You Were Out was the band's third release of 1986.

"The Judge" was covered by the Wildhearts on their album Stop Us If You've Heard This One Before, Vol 1. "Closer to the Stars" was covered by Automatic 7 on their debut release.

== Critical reception ==
Professional ratings
Review scores
Source	Rating
AllMusic	3/5 stars
Robert Christgau	B+
Los Angeles Daily News	A
The Rolling Stone Album Guide	3/5 stars
Spin Alternative Record Guide	7/10

Robert Christgau noted that "once again the most striking track is a slow country-folk rip." The New York Times wrote that Soul Asylum "plays explosive speed-rock in jubilant major keys, the sound of frustration transmuted into sheer momentum." The Advocate deemed the album "professional level garage band music that embodies the very spirit of rock and roll." The Los Angeles Daily News concluded that the band "has moved beyond its punk roots without sacrificing its raw power."

== Track listing ==
1. "Freaks" – 3:26
2. "Carry On" – 2:22
3. "No Man's Land" – 2:56
4. "Crashing Down" – 2:16
5. "The Judge" – 3:09
6. "Sun Don't Shine" – 2:45
7. "Closer to the Stars" – 2:51
8. "Never Too Soon" – 2:59
9. "Miracle Mile" – 2:17
10. "Lap of Luxury" – 1:53
11. "Passing Sad Daydream" – 6:13
