= Sterling Campbell =

American musician

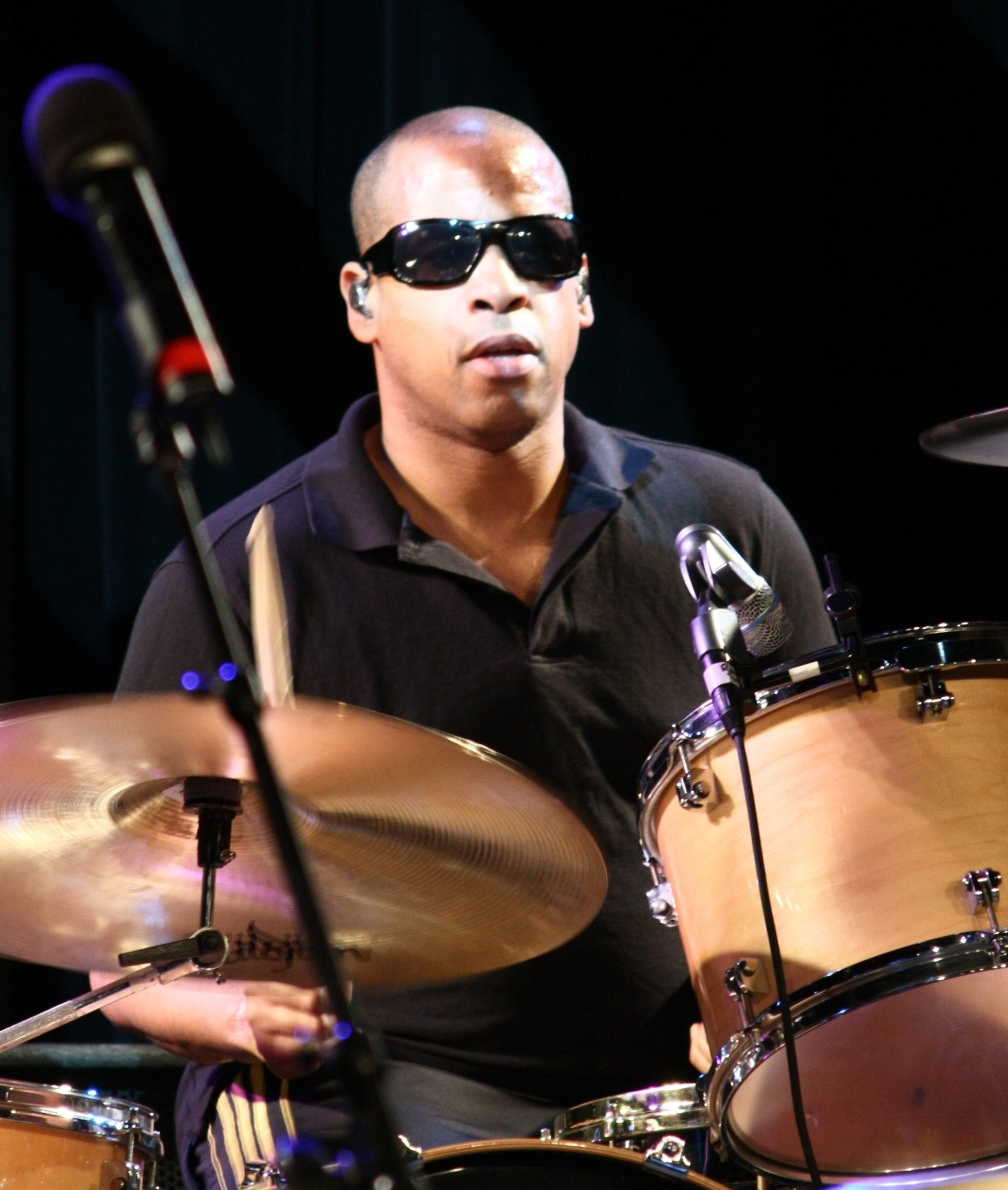
- Campbell supporting the B-52s during a 2009 tour

Background information
- Born: May 3, 1964 (age 62); New York City, United States
- Genres: Rock; alternative rock; funk
- Occupations: Musician; songwriter
- Instruments: Drums; percussion
- Years active: 1986–present
- Member of: The B-52s
- Formerly of: Duran Duran; Soul Asylum

Sterling Campbell (born May 3, 1964) is an American drummer and songwriter who has worked with numerous high-profile acts, including Chic, the B-52s, Duran Duran, Soul Asylum, Cyndi Lauper, Nena, Grayson Hugh, Spandau Ballet, Gustavo Cerati, and David Bowie.

== Early life ==
Campbell was born and raised in New York City, in an African-American family with five older brothers, all of whom enjoyed music from funk and Motown, to rock and beyond, where he began learning to play the drums at age twelve. When he was fourteen years old, then-drummer in David Bowie's backing band, Dennis Davis, moved into the apartment building where Campbell's family resided. Davis invited him to come with him to see a Bowie concert, galvanizing the student to apply himself further on the drum kit. He attended high school at the High School of Music & Art (a part of the Fiorello H. LaGuardia High School of Music & Art and Performing Arts) from which he graduated. Campbell practiced, and composed his own songs, finding work as a session musician.

== Career ==
Campbell rose to international attention in 1986, touring with Cyndi Lauper on her True Colors World Tour. For the next ten years, he played with several notable bands which drew from different genres. In 1989, Campbell joined Duran Duran, and later was hired first as a session player in 1991 by Soul Asylum, playing on half of the tracks on their 1992 release, Grave Dancer's Union including their Grammy Award-winning single, "Runaway Train". Campbell soon replaced Soul Asylum's drummer Grant Young, and played with them from 1995 to 1998.

Campbell began recording with David Bowie in 1991 and later joined his band in 1992, touring with him for fourteen years, until the end of his A Reality Tour, in 2004. Campbell has worked with artists such as David Byrne, the B-52s, Chic, Tina Turner, Grayson Hugh and Gustavo Cerati. In 2007, he reunited with the B-52s and toured with the band into 2012. He toured with Cyndi Lauper again during her Girls Just Wanna Have Fun Farewell Tour (2024-2025).

== Falun Gong ==
In 1996, Campbell began practicing Falun Gong, a form of meditative qigong practice whose followers are persecuted in China. He traveled to Beijing in 2002 to demonstrate against the suppression, and was detained and beaten by police. He has since continued to advocate for human rights in China.
