= Soul Asylum =

American alternative rock band

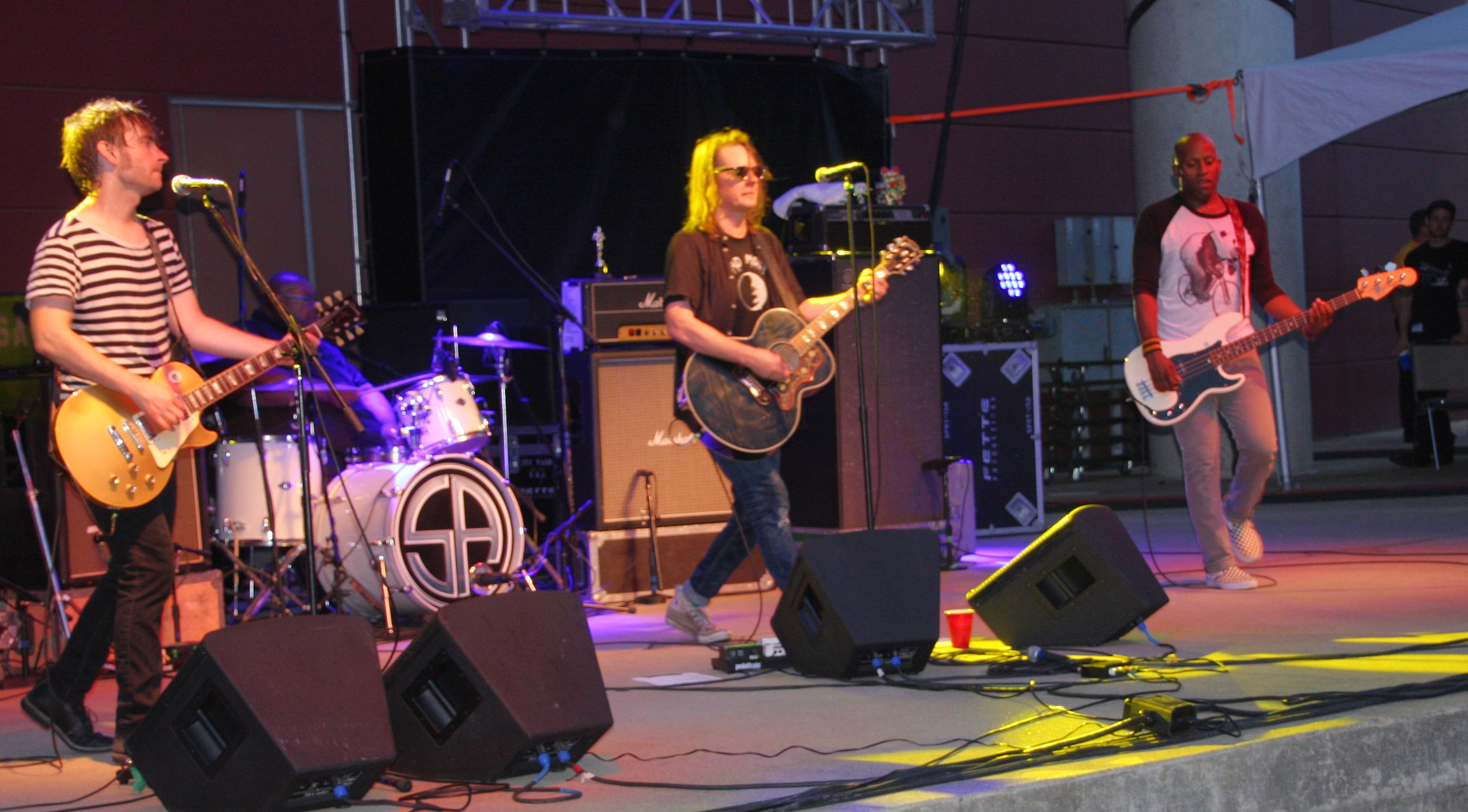
- Soul Asylum performing in Rochester, Minnesota, 2016

Background information
- Also known as: Loud Fast Rules (1981–83)
- Origin: Minneapolis, Minnesota, United States
- Genres: Alternative rock; grunge; country rock; punk rock (early)
- Years active: 1981–present
- Labels: Twin/Tone; A&M; Columbia/Legacy; 429 Records; Sire; eOne; Blue Élan Records
- Members: Dave Pirner; Michael Bland; Ryan Smith; Jeremy Tappero
- Past members: See members section
- Website: soulasylum.com

Soul Asylum is an American rock band formed in 1981 in Minneapolis, Minnesota. Their 1993 hit "Runaway Train" won the Grammy Award for Best Rock Song.

The band was originally called Loud Fast Rules, with a lineup consisting of Dave Pirner, Dan Murphy, Karl Mueller, and Pat Morley. They changed their name to Soul Asylum in 1983. Morley was replaced by Grant Young in 1984.

The band recorded three albums with Twin/Tone Records and two with A&M Records, with little commercial success. In 1992, they released the triple-platinum album Grave Dancers Union, featuring "Runaway Train". The band played at the inauguration of President Bill Clinton early the next year. They also scored a platinum record with the album Let Your Dim Light Shine three years later. In 1998 they recorded Candy from a Stranger. The band released four more albums over the next 15 years. Their most recent releases are Hurry Up and Wait in 2020, their twelfth studio release; and Slowly But Shirley in 2024, their thirteenth release.

Mueller was diagnosed with cancer in 2004, and the band organized a benefit concert on his behalf. Mueller died a year later.

== History ==
=== Formation and early years ===
The group was an outgrowth of a previous band, Loud Fast Rules, formed in 1981 by drummer and lead vocalist Dave Pirner, guitarist and backing vocalist Dan Murphy, and bassist Karl Mueller. Pirner switched to rhythm guitar, and Pat Morley took over on drums. As Loud Fast Rules, two of their songs were released on the 1982 Reflex Records cassette compilation Barefoot and Pregnant. On the following Reflex compilation, Kitten (recorded live at Goofy's Upper Deck), they were billed as Proud Crass Fools. Soul Asylum began performing around the Minneapolis–St. Paul area (including the First Avenue nightclub) and quickly developed a core following while becoming known for their powerful, dynamic stage shows.

Their 1984 debut album, Say What You Will... Everything Can Happen was originally released on LP and cassette by local record label Twin/Tone as a nine-song EP. It is out of print but was re-released on CD as Say What You Will, Clarence...Karl Sold the Truck, which includes five additional tracks that were cut from the original album. Between the release of Say What You Will and their second album, Grant Young joined the group, taking over the drums from Morley. In 1986, Soul Asylum released three albums: Made to Be Broken, Time's Incinerator (on cassette only) and While You Were Out.

The band toured relentlessly in its early years, opening for other American touring bands and later performing as a headliner act after gaining exposure on the "Flip Your Wig" tour with fellow Twin Cities band Hüsker Dü in early 1986. Contrasted with some of the popular underground and alternative styles at the time, audiences were struck by the band's onstage swagger, scruffy Midwestern appearance and extremely loud, frenetic sound, mixing tuneful but unrestrained punk, hardcore, 1970s rock, country and self-effacing kitsch. One early review described their sound as "some unholy mix of Kiss and Hank Williams thrown under the wheels of a runaway train." All elements contributed to the band's being described as a "grunge precursor", a claim often recited in comparisons between pre-Nirvana Minneapolis and Seattle bands. Despite critical acclaim locally and internationally, they remained unknown to a larger U.S. audience and radio market.

=== Mainstream popularity and success: 1988–1999 ===
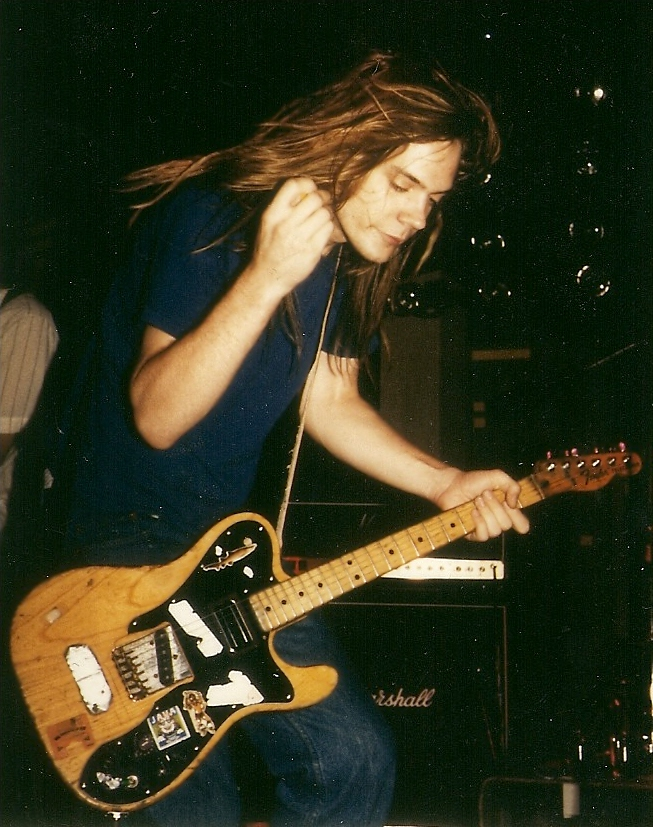
Dave Pirner at a Soul Asylum concert in Germany in 1990

The group signed with A&M Records in 1988. Their first offering on that label was Clam Dip & Other Delights (1989), the title and cover art being a parody of Whipped Cream & Other Delights, by A&M Records co-founder Herb Alpert. Hang Time was released in 1988, followed by And the Horse They Rode In On in 1990 (produced by X-pensive Winos drummer Steve Jordan). Because of poor sales and Pirner's hearing problems, the group considered disbanding.

After playing a series of acoustic shows in the early 1990s, they were picked up by Columbia Records. In 1992 they released Grave Dancers Union, which became their most popular album. On January 20, 1993, the group performed at the first inauguration of United States President Bill Clinton. Later that year, the band performed "Sexual Healing" for the AIDS benefit album No Alternative, produced by the Red Hot Organization. The band added keyboard player Joey Huffman in the summer of 1993. He toured with the band until joining Matchbox Twenty in 1998. Huffman played on the albums Let Your Dim Light Shine, After the Flood: Live from the Grand Forks Prom, June 28, 1997, and The Silver Lining. Soul Asylum won the 1994 Grammy Award for Best Rock Song for "Runaway Train". The music video for that song featured photographs and names of missing children, in the style of a public service announcement. At the end of the video, Pirner appeared and said, "If you've seen one of these kids, or you are one of them, please call this number", and then the telephone number of a missing children's help line was shown. For use outside the U.S., the video was edited to include photos and names of missing children from the area where the video would be shown. The video was instrumental in reuniting several children with their families.

Before their next studio album, drummer Grant Young was fired and was replaced by Sterling Campbell. Campbell had been credited as providing percussion on Grave Dancers Union (although he had actually done at least half of the drumming on that album). The next release, Let Your Dim Light Shine, included the track "Misery", which reached the Top 20, but the album was not as successful as the band's previous one. In 1997 Soul Asylum performed a benefit concert for North Dakota students whose prom had been cancelled because of the Red River Flood of 1997. Some of the songs played during the prom were later released on After the Flood: Live from the Grand Forks Prom, June 28, 1997 in 2004. The group released Candy from a Stranger the following year. The album was unsuccessful, and the band was dropped by Columbia Records. Pirner said, "It's sort of sad to say, but you could see the whole grunge-rock-band thing getting totally over-saturated and people were looking for something new." The band took a step back; Pirner explained, "We needed to reassess how far we've gone and how much further we're going to go and which way we want to go and what we do right and what we do wrong. It was kind of time to take inventory."

=== 2000s ===
Pirner became friends with the film director Kevin Smith, a longtime Soul Asylum fan. Soul Asylum contributed music to three Kevin Smith films, Clerks, Clerks II, and 1997's Chasing Amy (in which Pirner provided the score). Smith directed the music video for the song "Can't Even Tell," which was featured on the Clerks soundtrack.

In May 2004, bassist Mueller was diagnosed with throat cancer and underwent treatment. In October 2004, a benefit concert was held for him in Minneapolis at The Quest nightclub, featuring popular local groups and musicians, including Soul Asylum, the Gear Daddies, Paul Westerberg, and former Hüsker Dü bandmates Bob Mould and Grant Hart, who reunited for their first performance together in sixteen years. The benefit raised over $50,000. At the time, Mueller's cancer was in remission, and he played with his bandmates during the show. Mueller later recorded his last Soul Asylum album, The Silver Lining. However, the cancer returned, and he died at his home on June 17, 2005. Soul Asylum released The Silver Lining on July 11, 2006, their first album of new material since Candy from a Stranger, released eight years earlier.

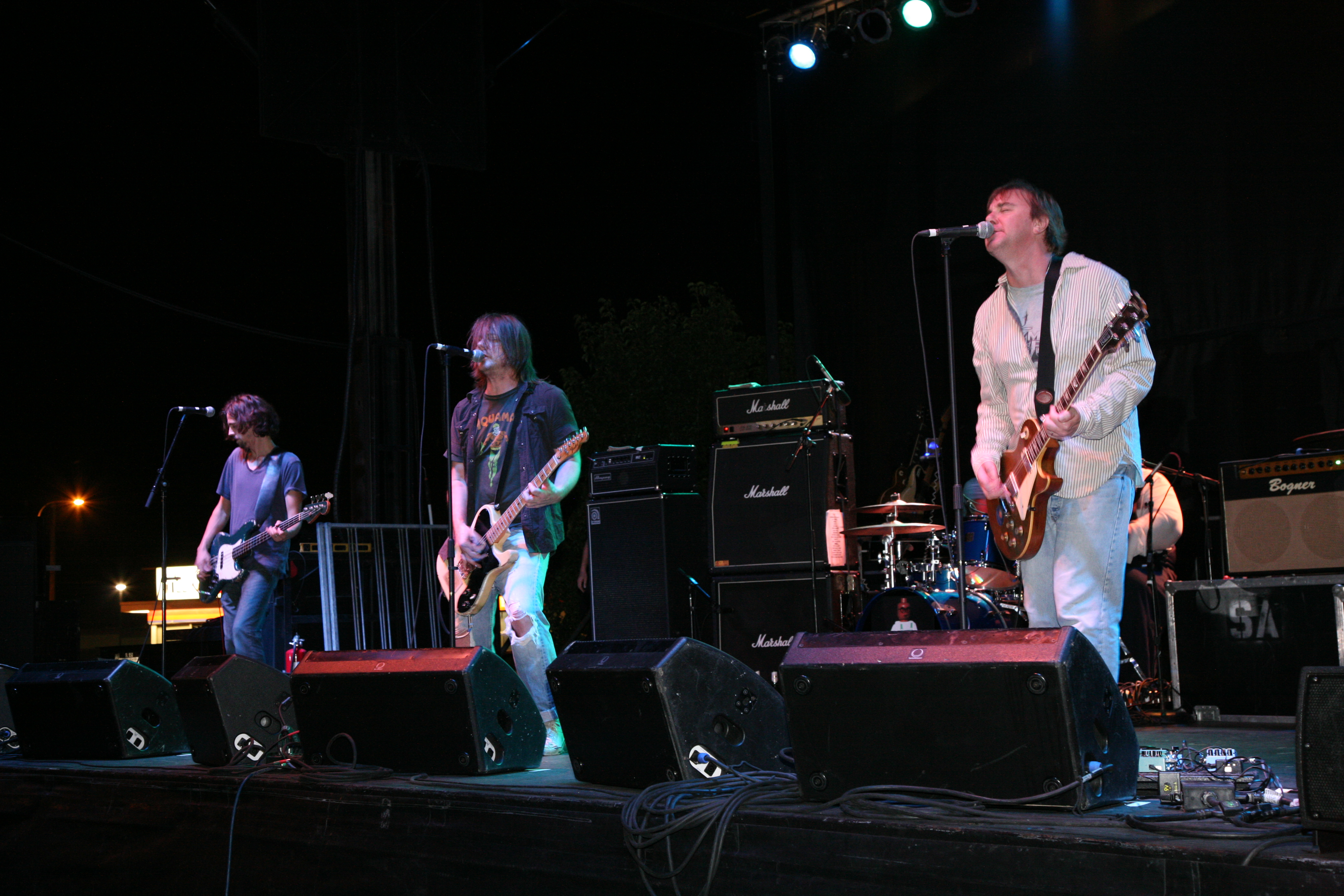
Soul Asylum in 2010

In late 2005, ex-Replacements bassist (and former Guns N' Roses bassist) Tommy Stinson and former Prince drummer Michael Bland joined Soul Asylum. The band completed its American tour in support of The Silver Lining in late 2006. In November and December 2006 they opened for Cheap Trick on that band's American tour. On March 10, 2007, Soul Asylum joined Cyndi Lauper, Mint Condition, and Lifehouse in a concert to benefit Wain McFarlane, the leader of the reggae band Ipso Facto, to help pay for the expenses of a kidney transplant.

=== 2010s & 2020s ===
Stinson was a permanent member until 2012, but in 2006 and 2007, while he was on tour with Guns N' Roses, his place was temporarily filled by George Scot McKelvey. During the 2010 Guns N' Roses world tour, his fill-in was Pete Donnelly. Soul Asylum released the album Delayed Reaction in 2012.

On October 9, 2012, guitarist Dan Murphy retired from Soul Asylum to focus on his private life.

In November 2012, Winston Roye replaced Tommy Stinson on bass and Justin Sharbono replaced Dan Murphy on guitar. In 2016, Ryan Smith replaced Sharbono.

In 2014, Karl Mueller's widow Mary Beth founded the nonprofit Kill Kancer in Karl's memory to help continue the fight against cancer.

The band's twelfth studio album, Hurry Up and Wait, was released on April 17, 2020.

The COVID-19 pandemic interrupted the 2020 tour in support of "Hurry Up and Wait" with a final performance at the Teragram Ballroom in Los Angeles on March 11, 2020. Pirner and Smith instead hosted frequent "live" performances during the 2020 shutdown via Facebook and Instagram.

Soul Asylum returned to the stage on June 26, 2021 performing in New Lenox, Illinois as the opening act for the Bodeans.

In March 2023, through Kill Kancer, singer Dave Pirner and bassist Jeremy Tappero met with Alex Etheridge, a 13-year-old Phoenix musician suffering from bone cancer, at Flowers Studio in Minneapolis. Flowers was founded by musician Ed Ackerson, who died of pancreatic cancer in 2019; Ackerson's widow Ashley donated the studio time to Alex. The trio recorded Alex's song "Home Sweet Home". The song is about how Alex's thoughts of returning home helped him deal with being in the hospital. It was largely written by Alex himself, who had worked out the drums parts, lyrics, and main guitar riff before meeting with Soul Asylum. He and the band spent four hours in the studio working on the song, which was later released on SoundCloud. Alex died on July 19, 2023.

In June 2024, the band released a new single "Trial By Fire,” followed by “High Road” on July 17 from their upcoming thirteenth studio album, Slowly but Shirley, set to be released in the fall.

== Musical style & legacy ==
The band have been described musically as alternative rock, grunge, country rock, punk rock, pop rock, post-grunge and indie rock.

In 2025, Jeff Mezydlo of Yardbarker included the band in his list of "20 underrated bands from the 1990s who are worth rediscovering".

== Awards & honors ==
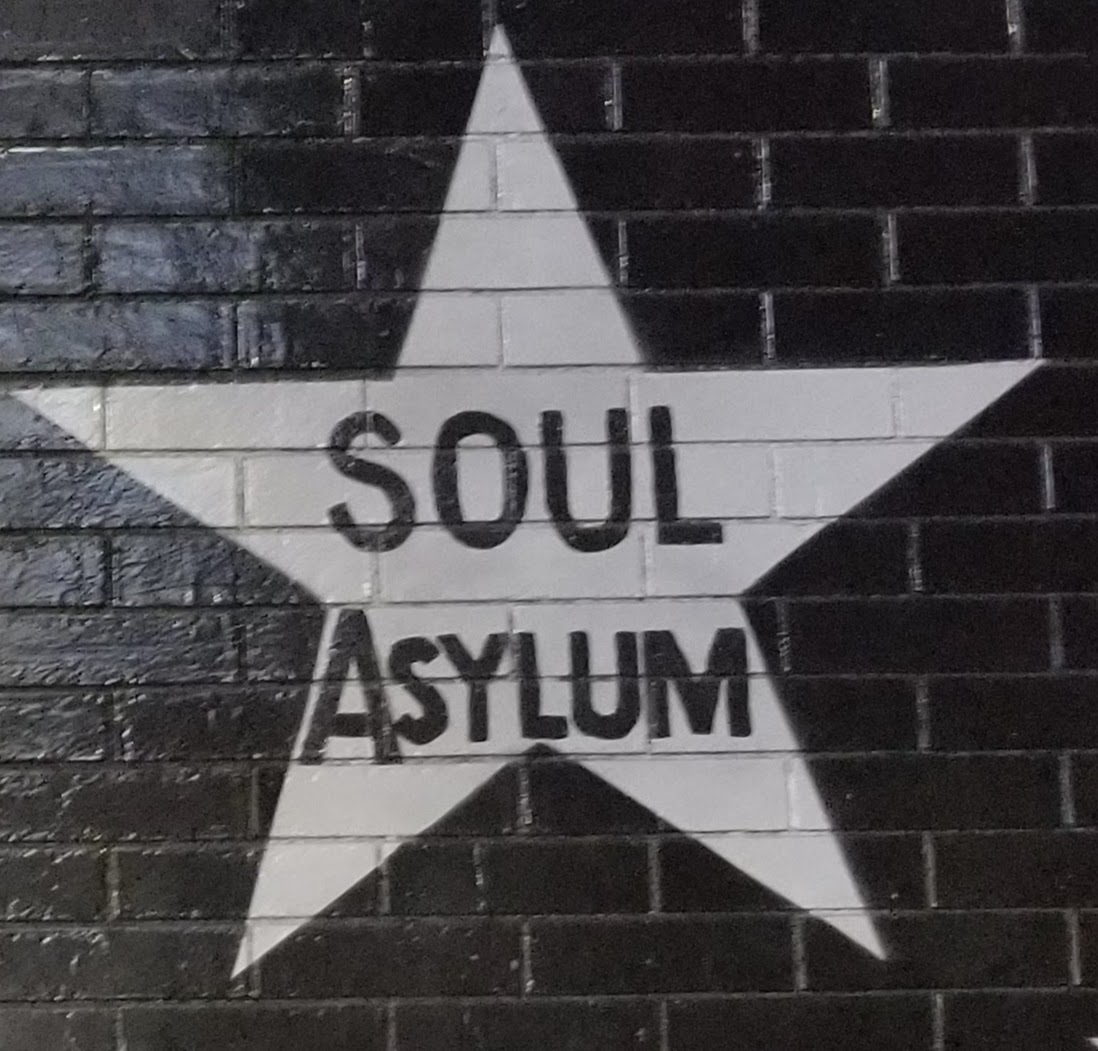
Soul Asylum's star on the outside mural of the Minneapolis nightclub First Avenue

The band has been honored with a star on the outside mural of the Minneapolis nightclub First Avenue, recognizing performers that have played sold-out shows or have otherwise demonstrated a major contribution to the culture at the iconic venue. Receiving a star "might be the most prestigious public honor an artist can receive in Minneapolis," according to journalist Steve Marsh.

== Band members ==
Current members

- Dave Pirner – lead vocals (1981–present), drums (1981–83), rhythm guitar, saxophone, piano (1983–present)
- Jeremy Tappero – bass guitar, backing vocals (2020–present)
- Ryan Smith – lead guitar, backing vocals (2016–present)
- Michael Bland – drums, backing vocals (2005–present)

Former members

- Dan Murphy – lead guitar, backing vocals (1981–2012)
- Karl Mueller – bass guitar (1981–2005)
- Pat Morley – drums (1983–84)
- Grant Young – drums (1984–94)
- Sterling Campbell – drums (1992, session; 1994–98)
- Joey Huffman – keyboards (1993–97, session; 2003–06, session)
- Ian Mussington – drums (1998–2005)
- Tommy Stinson – bass guitar (2005–12)
- Justin Sharbono – lead guitar, backing vocals (2012–16)
- Ian Prince – drums (2019)
- Winston Roye – bass guitar, backing vocals (2012–20)

Former touring members

- George Scot McKelvey – bass guitar (2006–07)
- Pete Donnelly – bass guitar (2010)

== Discography ==
- Say What You Will... (Twin/Tone, 1984)
- Made to Be Broken (Twin/Tone, 1986)
- While You Were Out (Twin/Tone, 1986)
- Hang Time (A&M, 1988)
- And the Horse They Rode In On (A&M, 1990)
- Grave Dancers Union (Columbia, 1992)
- Let Your Dim Light Shine (Columbia, 1995)
- Candy from a Stranger (Columbia, 1998)
- The Silver Lining (Legacy, 2006)
- Delayed Reaction (429, 2012)
- Change of Fortune (Entertainment One, 2016)
- Hurry Up and Wait (Blue Élan, 2020)
- Slowly but Shirley (Blue Élan, 2024)
