= Dan Murphy (musician) =

American musician (born 1962)

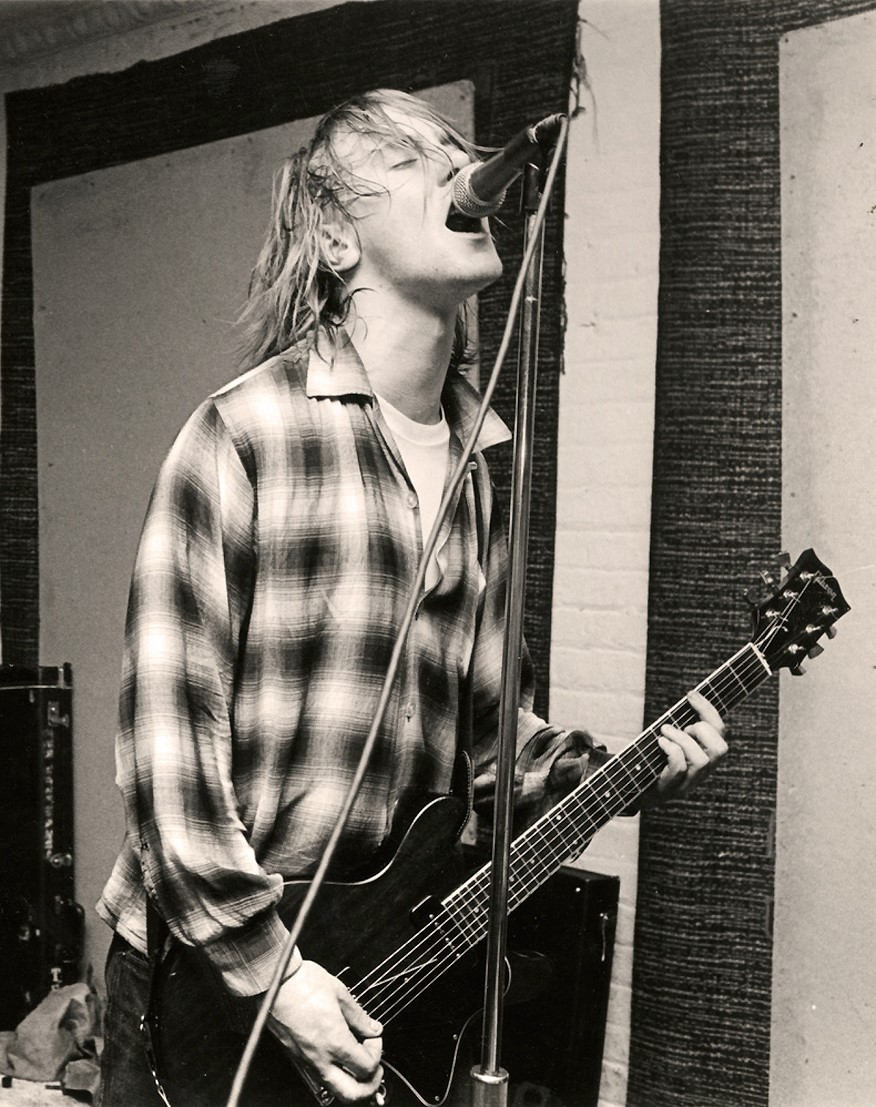
- Murphy practicing at Soul Asylum's Studio on Nicollet Avenue in South Minneapolis in 1986

Background information
- Born: Daniel Murphy; July 12, 1962 (age 64); Duluth, Minnesota, U.S.
- Genres: Alternative rock
- Occupations: Musician, songwriter
- Instruments: Guitar, vocals
- Years active: 1981–2012, 2019-present
- Labels: A&M, Columbia

Daniel David Murphy (born July 12, 1962, in Duluth, Minnesota) is an American musician best known as a co-founder lead guitarist for the alternative rock band, Soul Asylum from 1981 to 2012. He is also a member of Golden Smog.

== History ==
Murphy was the secondary songwriter in Soul Asylum, with Dave Pirner responsible for writing most of the band's material. Some of Murphy's solo writing credits include "Can't Go Back" from Made to Be Broken, "Cartoon" off Hang Time and "Gullible's Travels" from And the Horse They Rode in On. Additionally, he and Pirner co-wrote "Easy Street" which appeared on And the Horse They Rode in On, and he co-wrote "Promises Broken" off Let Your Dim Light Shine with Marc Perlman.

In 1988, Murphy formed Golden Smog, a Minneapolis supergroup made up of members of The Replacements, The Jayhawks and Run Westy Run. Murphy was credited as 'David Spear' on the group's second album, Down by the Old Mainstream, because of contractual obligations.

In 1992, Murphy appeared on the debut solo album by former Replacements drummer Chris Mars, Horseshoes and Hand Grenades.

Soul Asylum's success in the early 1990s gave Murphy the funds to start collecting pin-up art. This interest led to the opening of his own art gallery, the Grapefruit Moon Gallery, in 2003.

On October 9, 2012, Murphy announced his departure from Soul Asylum on the forum of "EnterTheSoulAsylum.com". In his announcement, he explained that "To survive in the game of music...one needs an unhealthy and combustive internal combination of two seemingly distant attributes - naivety and swagger. I no longer have either..." He further stated that he "look[ed] forward to a quieter life with friends and family".

On the occasion of his retirement he donated his Gibson Les Paul guitar, which he had used on every Soul Asylum album, to the Minnesota Historical Society. Since 2012, he has focused on running Grapefruit Moon Gallery.

In July 2019, Murphy reunited with members of Golden Smog for a one-off performance celebrating his 57th birthday. This performance was followed by the announcement of a Golden Smog show in April 2020. This latter performance was postponed due to COVID-19 concerns, eventually taking place on April 4, 2022.

In January 2020, Murphy started writing and recording new music with Jeff Arundel for a new music project called The Scarlet Goodbye. Their debut album "Hope's Eternal" was released March 24, 2023.
