= Karl Mueller =

American musician

- Born: July 27, 1963
- Died: June 17, 2005 (aged 41)
- Genres: Alternative rock
- Members: Soul Asylum

Karl Mueller (July 27, 1963 – June 17, 2005) was an American rock musician. He was the bass guitarist and a founding member of the Minneapolis alternative rock band Soul Asylum.

In May 2004, Mueller was diagnosed with esophageal cancer, and a benefit concert was held to help him with his medical bills. In September of that year, Grant Hart and Bob Mould of Hüsker Dü reunited for the first time in 17 years at the Rock for Karl benefit in Minneapolis. Paul Westerberg also made an appearance, as did Soul Asylum, in Mueller's last public performance. Mueller died of cancer in June 2005. He was cremated and his remains reside at Lakewood Cemetery in Minneapolis. His widow, Mary Beth, resides in Minneapolis. In 2014, she founded the nonprofit Kill Kancer in her husband's memory to help continue the fight against cancer.
