= Dave Pirner =

American musician (born 1964)

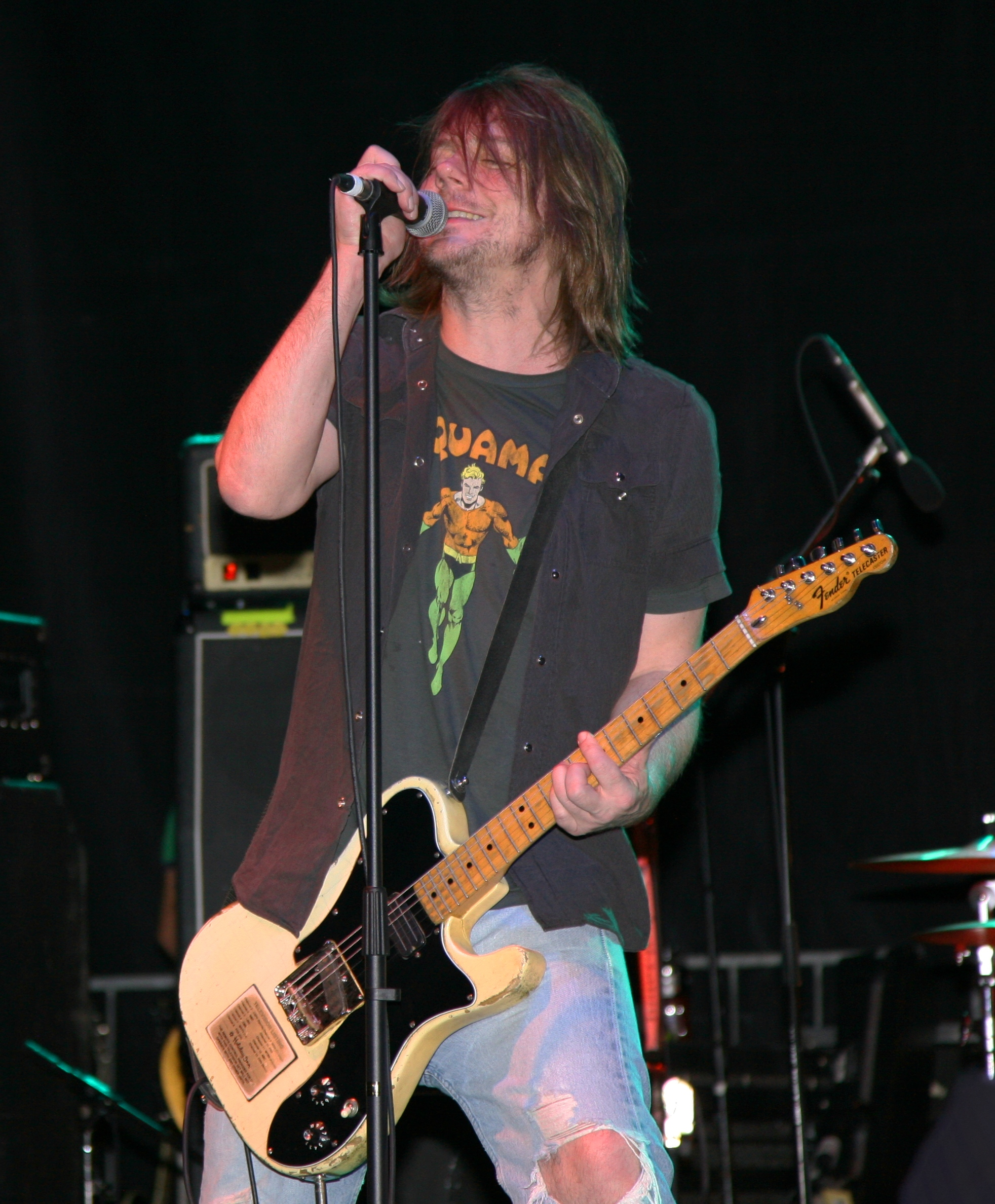
- Pirner in 2010

Background information
- Born: David Anthony Pirner; April 16, 1964 (age 62); Minneapolis, Minnesota, U.S.
- Genres: Alternative rock, grunge
- Occupations: Musician, songwriter, record producer
- Instruments: Vocals, guitar, trumpet, drums, percussion, keyboard, harmonica, saxophone
- Years active: 1981–present
- Labels: A&M, Columbia

David Anthony Pirner (born April 16, 1964) is an American songwriter, singer, and producer best known as the lead vocalist and frontman for the alternative rock band Soul Asylum.

== Early life and work ==
Pirner was born in Minneapolis, Minnesota, and graduated from Minneapolis West High School in 1982. He taught himself how to play the drums. By age 20, Pirner started his career drumming with a punk band called Loud Fast Rules as part of the Minneapolis scene, together with Karl Mueller (bass) and Dan Murphy (guitar). When Pirner switched to singing and playing rhythm guitar, Pat Morley joined on drums. Morley was later replaced by Grant Young, and the band changed their name to Soul Asylum. After touring the United States for a number of years they gathered a cult following of fans, but did not quite reach commercial visibility. Pirner at the time was the band's songwriter and he produced the album, Coup De Grace, by the Minneapolis metal band the Coup de Grace in 1990. In the late 1980s and early 1990s, he was a member of the supergroup Golden Smog.

== Commercial success ==
The band achieved commercial success and visibility on MTV and VH1 with the 1993 single "Runaway Train", followed by another hit song, "Black Gold"; both from their album Grave Dancers Union. As Soul Asylum grew in popularity, Pirner was seen guesting on albums of differing genres, including artists like Paul Westerberg, Jason Karaban, Mike Watt, The Autumn Defense and Victoria Williams.

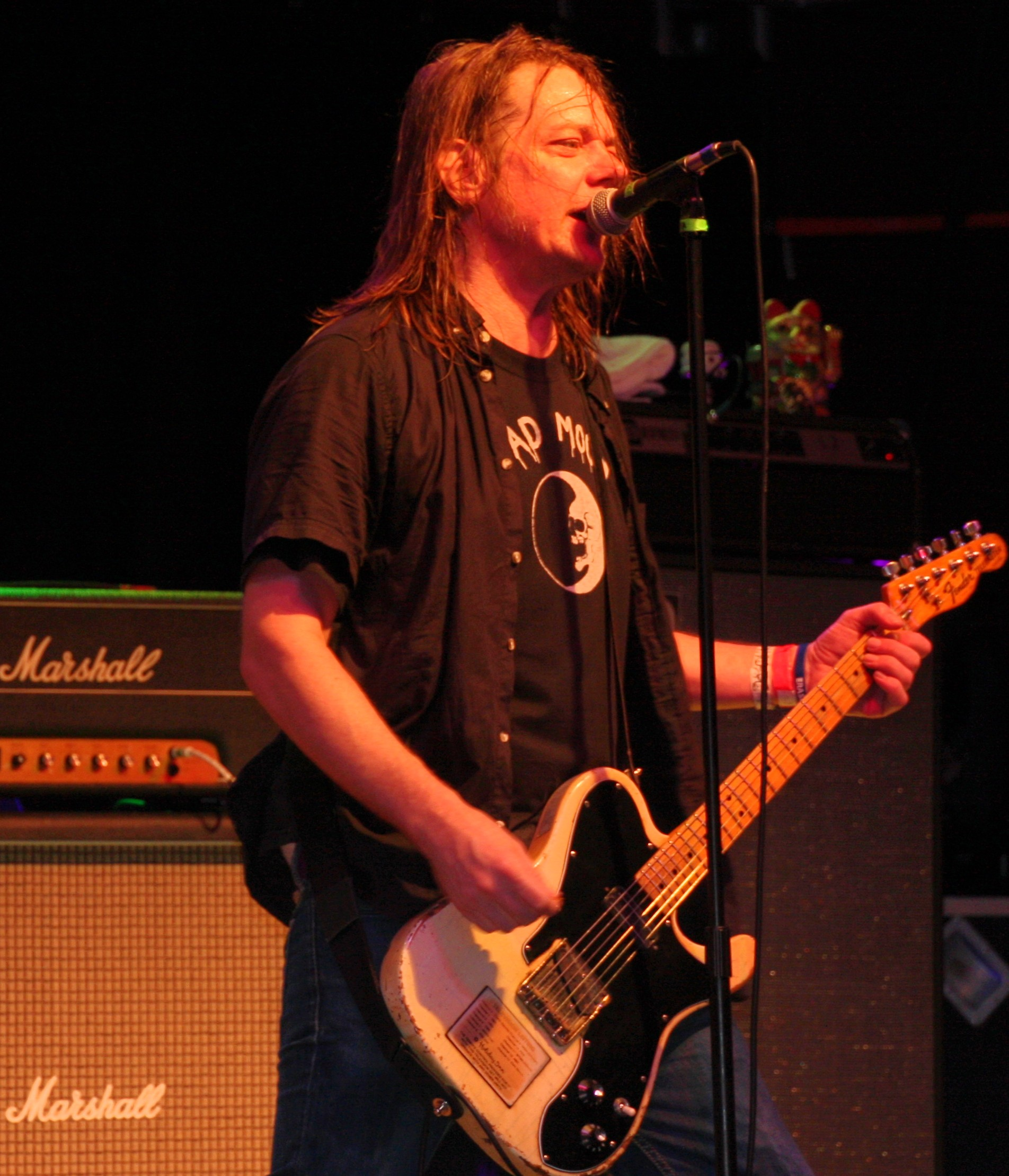
Pirner playing with Soul Asylum in 2016

By 1999, Soul Asylum went into hiatus after making their eighth album Candy from a Stranger (1998). After four years, the band reunited and started writing songs in the studio. Bassist Karl Mueller died in 2005, at the age of 42, from esophageal cancer. About a year after his death, Soul Asylum released The Silver Lining on Legacy Recordings which was dedicated to Mueller. Soul Asylum toured with their new line-up, which consisted of Pirner on guitar and vocals, Dan Murphy on lead guitar, Michael Bland on drums and Tommy Stinson on bass (as well as John Fields standing in on bass and piano for Mueller). In 2012, Soul Asylum released an album titled Delayed Reaction, followed in 2016 by Change of Fortune and in 2020 by Hurry Up And Wait.

Pirner had a small role in the film Reality Bites in 1994. He was also part of the all-star band assembled for the soundtrack of the 1994 film Backbeat. Pirner also contributed to the soundtrack of Kevin Smith's 1997 film Chasing Amy with an instrumental song called "Tube Of Wonderful". There are two songs by the band Soul Asylum featured in the film: "Lucky One" and "We 3". Pirner also composed the incidental music for the film. The song "Can't Even Tell" is featured in Smith's Clerks, and Smith used "Misery" in the sequel, Clerks II.

In 2002 Pirner released his first solo album, titled Faces & Names, on Ultimatum Music. He also contributed guest vocals on the song "Chillout Tent" in The Hold Steady's 2006 release, Boys and Girls in America. In 2020 he released the book Loud Fast Words: Soul Asylum Collected Lyrics and when the pandemic stopped the tour Soul Asylum was making for their new album, Pirner and the band's guitar player Ryan Smith played 100 original songs on weekly Facebook streams that were called The Quarantine Sessions.

== Personal life ==
Pirner started dating actress Winona Ryder after the pair were introduced at Soul Asylum's performance on MTV Unplugged in 1993. They broke up three years later.

Pirner lived in Carrollton, New Orleans, Louisiana for a time and still maintains a residence and recording studio in New Orleans. He also maintains a residence in Minneapolis. He has a son with his ex-wife.

== Discography ==
=== Solo ===
- 2002: Faces & Names (Ultimatum Music)

=== Guest appearances ===
- 2006: The Hold Steady – "Chillout Tent" (Boys and Girls in America)
- 2014: Within Temptation – "Whole World Is Watching" (Hydra)

== Bibliography ==
- Pirner, Dave (2020). Loud Fast Words: Soul Asylum Collected Lyrics. St. Paul, MN: Minnesota Historical Society Press. p. 344. ISBN 978-1-68134-172-9.
