= Motion City Soundtrack discography =

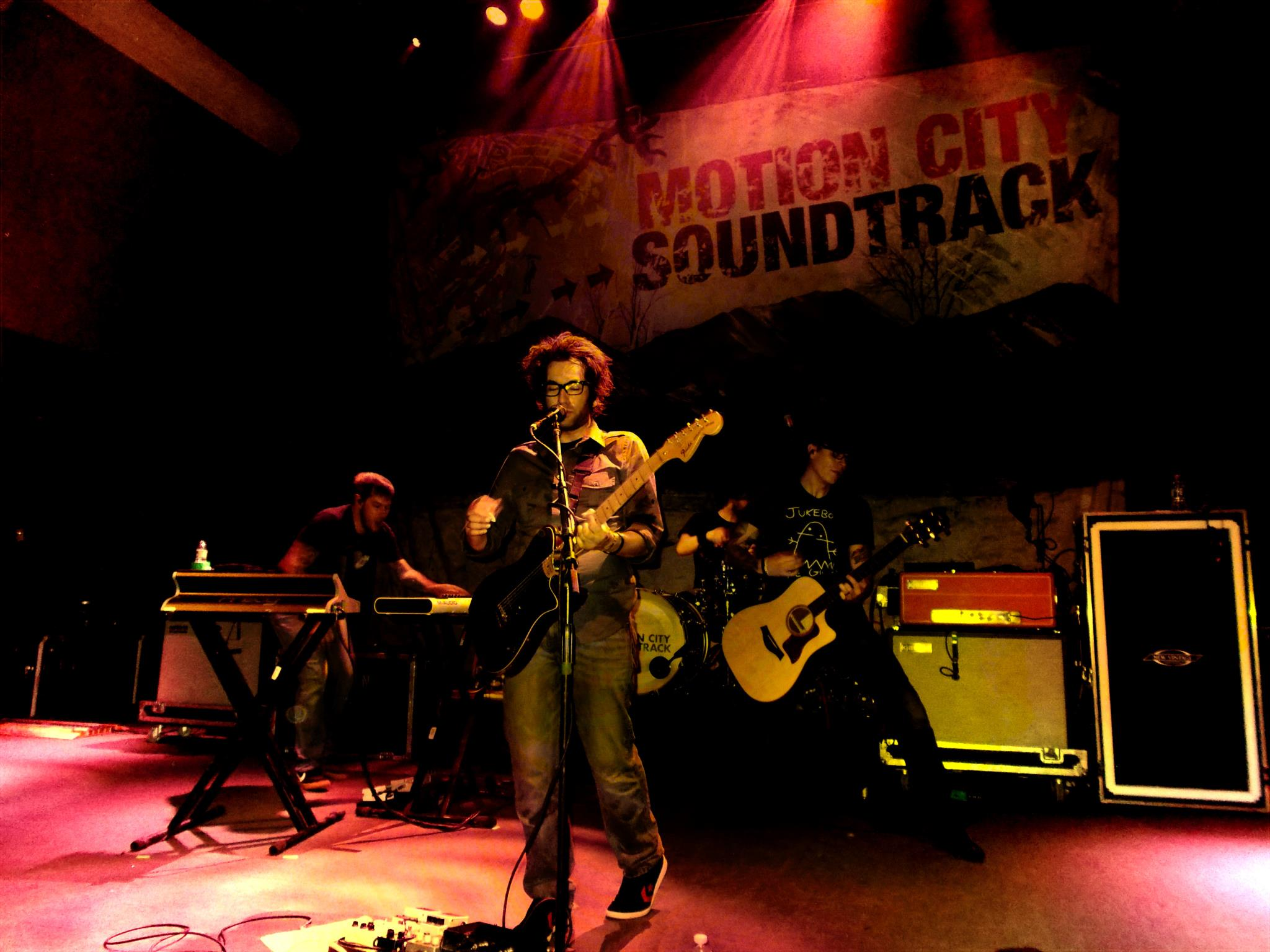
- Motion City Soundtrack performing in Washington, D.C. in 2012
- Studio albums: 7
- Extended plays: 5
- Live albums: 1
- Singles: 19
- Music videos: 15
- Split, EPs: 5

The following is the discography of Motion City Soundtrack, an American rock band that formed in Minneapolis, Minnesota in 1997. The band's line-up consisted of vocalist and guitarist Justin Pierre, lead guitarist Joshua Cain, keyboardist Jesse Johnson, bassist Matthew Taylor, and drummer Tony Thaxton. Over the course of their nearly twenty-year career, the group toured heavily and released seven studio albums, the majority on independent label Epitaph Records. The band's sound, at times described as pop punk or emo, made notable use of the Moog synthesizer.

Their first album, I Am the Movie, was originally self-released in 2002 before the group signed to Epitaph, which re-released the album in 2003. Their breakthrough album, Commit This to Memory, arrived in 2005; it achieved the highest sales in the band's discography, selling over 500,000 albums worldwide. Their third record, Even If It Kills Me (2007), also achieved commercial success. The band briefly signed to major label Columbia for their fourth album, My Dinosaur Life (2010), which represented their best performance on U.S. charts, peaking at number 15 on the Billboard 200. They rejoined Epitaph for Go in 2012 and Panic Stations in 2015, both of which represented large drop-offs in sales and chart performance. The band split up in 2016, but reformed in 2019 and released their seventh album, The Same Old Wasted Wonderful World in September 2025.

The band's discography consists of seven studio albums, one live album, twenty singles, five extended plays, and five split EPs. The group also produced fifteen music videos and appeared on numerous compilation albums.

== Albums ==
=== Studio albums ===
List of studio albums, with selected chart positions and sales figures
Title	Album details	Peak chart positions							Sales	Certifications
Title	Album details	US	US Ind.	US Alt.	US Rock	AUS	CAN	UK	Sales	Certifications
I Am the Movie	Released: December 27, 2002; Re-released: June 24, 2003; Label: Self-released, Epitaph (re-release)	—	42	—	—	—	—	—		
Commit This to Memory	Released: June 7, 2005; Label: Epitaph	72	2	—	—	—	—	—	US: 285,000	RIAA: Gold
Even If It Kills Me	Released: September 18, 2007; Label: Epitaph	16	1	5	5	52	86	113	US: 33,000	
My Dinosaur Life	Released: January 19, 2010; Label: Columbia	15	—	3	3	50	48	191	US: 27,000	
Go	Released: June 12, 2012; Label: Epitaph	46	8	8	21	84	—	—		
Panic Stations	Released: September 18, 2015; Label: Epitaph	141	22	18	28	80	—	—		
The Same Old Wasted Wonderful World	Released: September 19, 2025; Label: Epitaph	—	—	—	—	—	—	—		
"—" denotes a recording that did not chart or was not released in that territory.

=== Live albums ===
Title	Album details
Spotify Sessions	Released: 2013; Label: Epitaph; Format: Streaming audio (Spotify)

== Extended plays ==
Title	EP details
Kids for America	Released: 2000; Label: Modern Radio Records / Self-release
Back to the Beat	Released: 2000; Label: Modern Radio Records / Self-release
Live at Lollapalooza 2007: Motion City Soundtrack	Released: 18 September 2007; Label: Lolla Records / IODA; Format: Live EP
Acoustic EP	Released: 6 May 2008; Exclusive to iTunes Store; Format: Digital EP
Making Moves 7"	Released: 6 November 2012; Label: Mad Dragon Records; Format: Vinyl, Digital EP

=== Splits ===
List of splits
Title	Extended play details	Other artist(s)
Motion City Soundtrack / Schatzi	Released: April 22, 2003; Label: Doghouse; Formats: 12" vinyl, CD	Schatzi
Matchbook Romance / Motion City Soundtrack	Released: September 7, 2004; Label: Epitaph; Formats: 10" vinyl, CD	Matchbook Romance
Motion City Soundtrack / Limbeck	Released: September 21, 2004; Label: Vinyl Nerd; Formats: 7" vinyl	Limbeck
Wait So Long / Disappear	Released: November 22, 2011; Label: Banjodad; Formats: 7" vinyl	Trampled By Turtles
(Sort Of) A Song for Patsy Cline / It's (Sort Of) A Pleasure to Meet You	Released: December 1, 2015; Label: Hopeless; Formats: 7" vinyl	The Wonder Years

== Singles ==
List of singles, with selected chart positions and certifications, showing year released and album name
Title	Year	Peak chart positions				Certifications	Album
Title	Year	US Bub.	AUS	UK	UK Indie	Certifications	Album
"Promenade / Carolina"	1999	—	—	—	—		Non-album single
"The Future Freaks Me Out"	2003	—	—	156	—		I Am the Movie
"My Favorite Accident"	2003	—	—	—	—		I Am the Movie
"Everything Is Alright"	2005	16	—	—	—	RIAA: Gold	Commit This to Memory
"Hold Me Down"	2006	—	—	—	—		Commit This to Memory
"L.G. Fuad"	2006	—	—	—	—		Commit This to Memory
"Broken Heart"	2007	—	—	—	—		Even If It Kills Me
"This Is for Real"	2007	—	48	154	6		Even If It Kills Me
"It Had to Be You"	2008	—	—	—	—		Even If It Kills Me
"Fell in Love Without You" (Acoustic)	2008	—	—	—	—		Even If It Kills Me – Acoustic EP
"Disappear"	2009	—	—	—	—		My Dinosaur Life
"Her Words Destroyed My Planet"	2009	—	—	—	—		My Dinosaur Life
"A Lifeless Ordinary (Need a Little Help)"	2010	—	—	—	—		My Dinosaur Life
"True Romance"	2012	—	—	—	—		Go
"Timelines"	2012	—	—	—	—		Go
"Inside Out"	2013	—	—	—	—		Non-album single
"TKO"	2015	—	—	—	—		Panic Stations
"Lose Control"	2015	—	—	—	—		Panic Stations
"It's a Pleasure to Meet You"	2015	—	—	—	—		Panic Stations
"Crooked Ways"	2020	—	—	—	—		Non-album single
"Stop Talking"	2024		—	—	—		Non-album single
"—" denotes a recording that did not chart or was not released in that territory.

=== Promotional singles ===
List of promotional singles, showing year released and album name
Title	Year	Album
"When "You're" Around"	2005	Commit This to Memory
"Attractive Today"	2006	Commit This to Memory

== Guest appearances ==
List of guest appearances, showing year released and album name
Title	Year	Album
"The Greatest Fall (Of All Time)"	2003	Punk-O-Rama 8
"Capital H" (Live) "Red Dress" (Live)	2004	Mountain Dew Presents: Dew Music Showcase (Note: Mountain Dew Presents: Dew Music Showcase was a promotional CD consisting of live performances recorded on March 19, 2004 at La Zona Rosa in Austin, Texas. It was released with the July 2004 issue of Alternative Press (issue 191).)
"My Favorite Accident" (Acoustic)	2004	In Honor: A Compilation to Beat Cancer
"Pop Song 89"	2005	Punk Goes 80's
"Truth Hits Everybody"	2005	¡Policia!: A Tribute to the Police
"The Worst Part"	2006	Sound of Superman
"Always Running Out of Time"	2010	Almost Alice
"Waiting"	2010	Lost Out in the Machinery – The Songs of the Rentals
"Here Comes the Sun"	2011	Minnesota Beatle Project Vol. 3
"Left and Leaving"	2014	Friends

== Music videos ==
Year	Title	Director
2003	"The Future Freaks Me Out"	Andrew Carranza
2003	"My Favorite Accident"	Andrew Carranza
2005	"Everything Is Alright"	Christopher Mills, Chris Grismer
2006	"Hold Me Down"	Matt McDermitt
2006	"L.G. Fuad"	Josh Thacker
2007	"Broken Heart"	Jesse Cain
2007	"This Is for Real"	Jay Martin
2008	"It Had to Be You"	Lauren Simpson
2008	"Fell in Love Without You" (Acoustic)	Jesse Cain
2009	"Disappear"	Jesse Cain
2010	"Her Words Destroyed My Planet"	Isaac Rentz
2010	"A Lifeless Ordinary (Need a Little Help)"	Shane Nelson
2012	"True Romance"	Jesse Cain
2015	"Lose Control"	Dan Huiting
2015	"It's a Pleasure to Meet You"	David Prindle

== See also ==
- List of songs recorded by Motion City Soundtrack
