= List of songs recorded by Motion City Soundtrack =

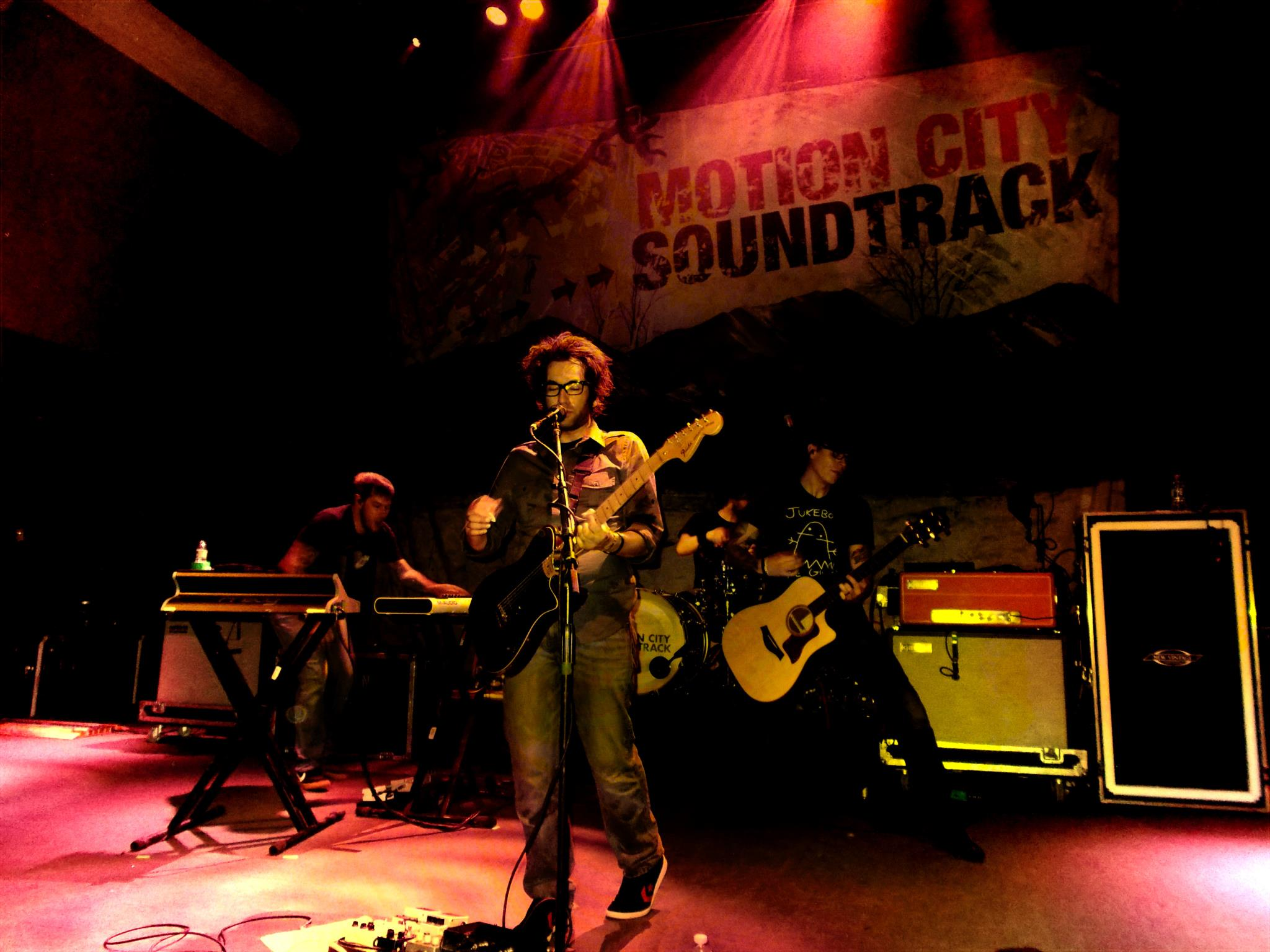
Motion City Soundtrack performing in Washington, D.C. in 2012

American rock band Motion City Soundtrack recorded songs for six studio albums, various soundtracks, compilations, and non-album singles. The majority of the group's original material was written by vocalist and guitarist Justin Pierre. The band also recorded cover versions of other artists' songs at various points throughout their career, including by the Beatles, Limbeck, the Police, R.E.M., the Rentals, Rilo Kiley, Trampled by Turtles, and the Weakerthans. In all, the group has recorded 111 songs, nine of which are covers.

== Songs ==
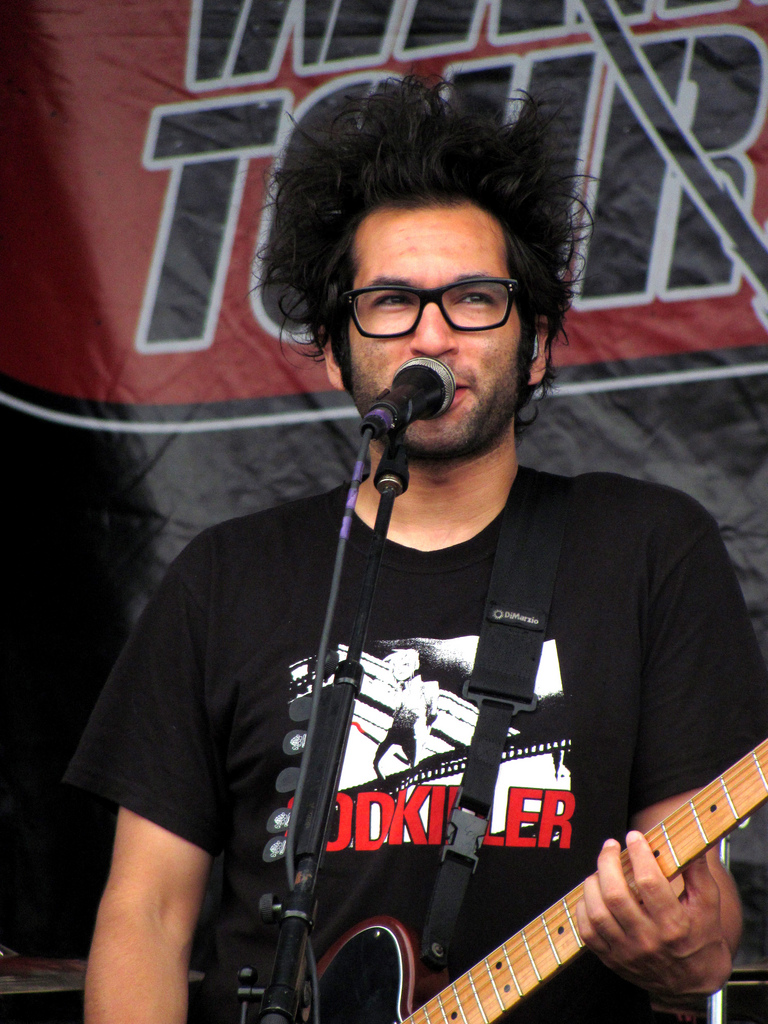
Justin Pierre, the band's lead vocalist and guitarist, was the primary lyricist for the band.

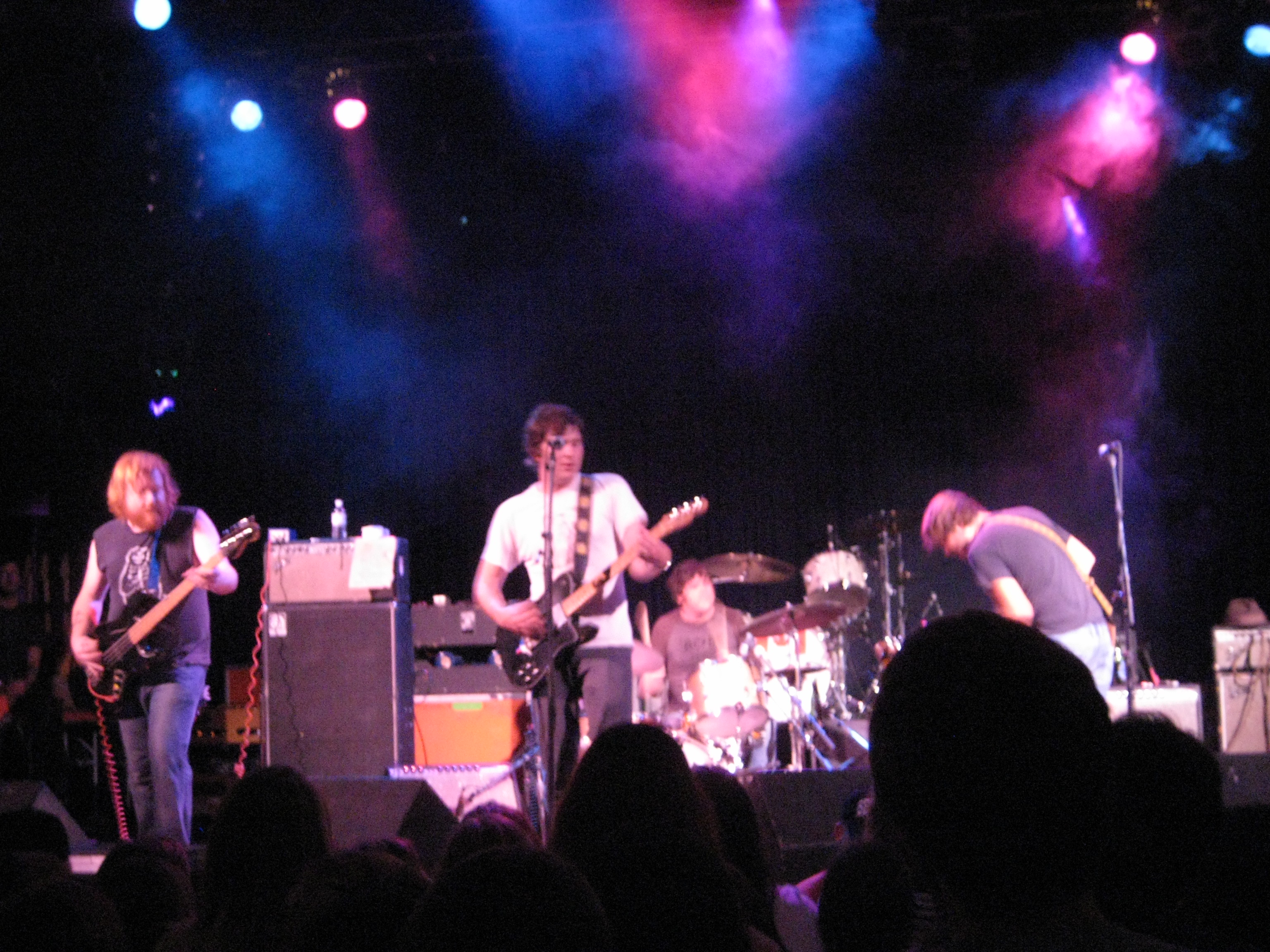
The band covered one song by their tour-mate Limbeck.

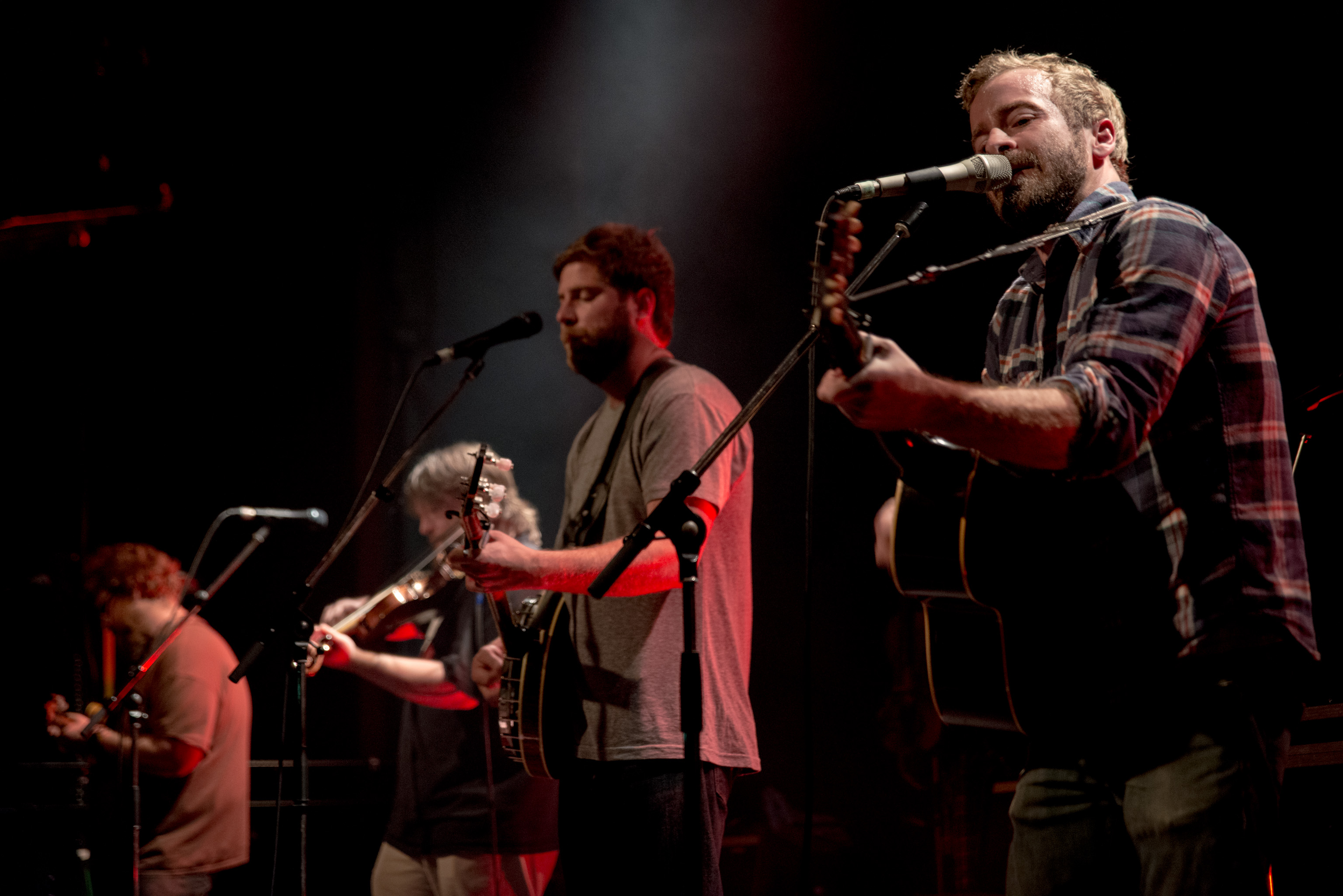
The band covered "Wait So Long" by Trampled by Turtles in 2011.

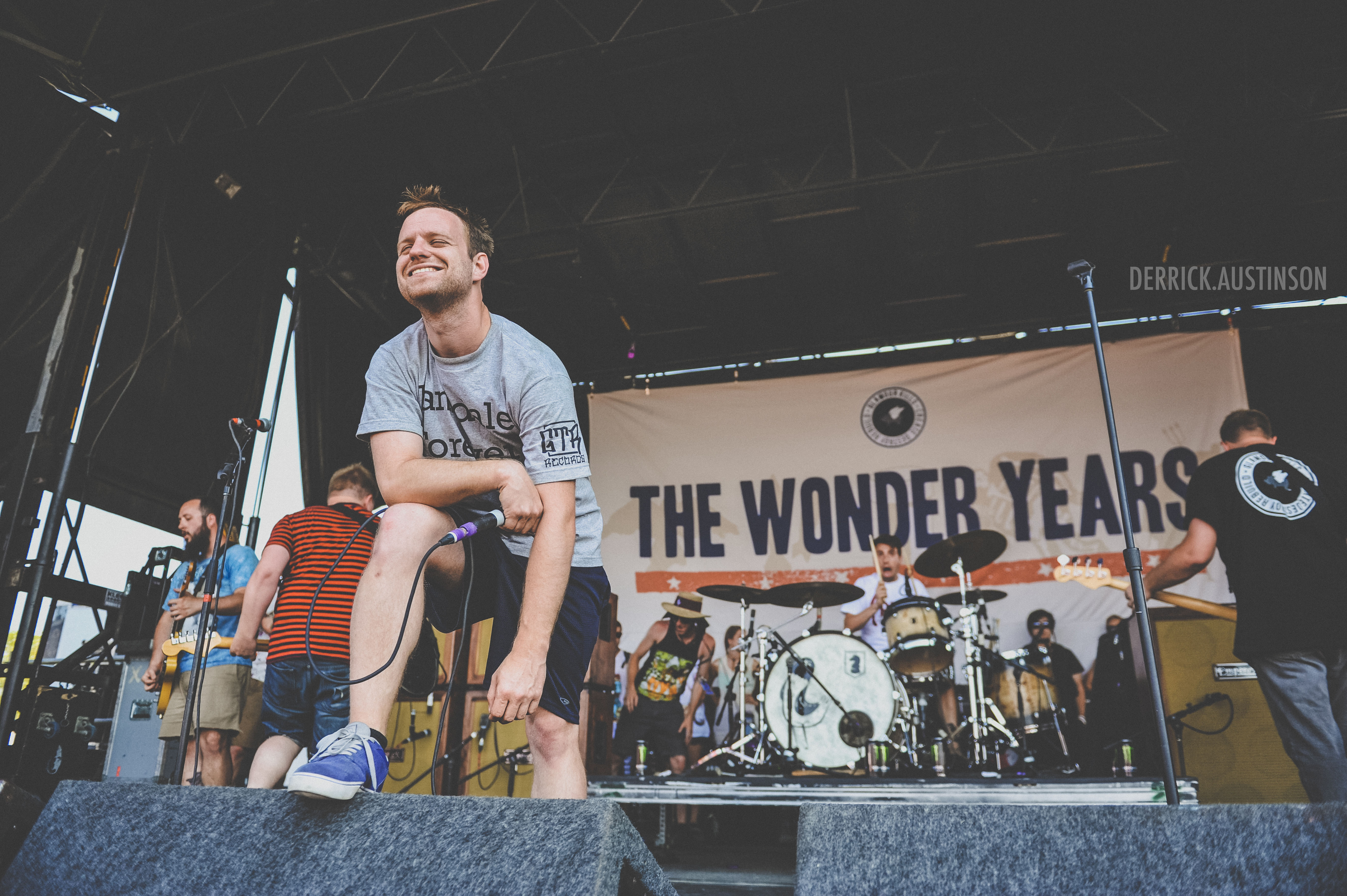
The band allowed Dan Campbell of The Wonder Years to rework their song "It's a Pleasure to Meet You" in 2015.

Key
†	Indicates single release
•	Indicates cover versions

Name of song, originating album, and year released.
Song	Album	Year	Ref.
"1000 Paper Cranes"	Kids for America	2000	
"4th of December"	Kids for America	2000	
"@!#?@!"	My Dinosaur Life	2010	
"Alcohol Eyes"	Go	2012	
"A Life Less Ordinary (Need a Little Help)" †	My Dinosaur Life	2010	
"Always Running Out of Time"	Almost Alice	2010	
"Antonia"	Even If It Kills Me	2007	
"Anything at All"	Panic Stations	2015	
"A-OK"	I Am the Movie	2003	
"Attractive Today"	Commit This to Memory	2005	
"Autographs & Apologies "	I Am the Movie	2003	
"Back to the Beat"	Back to the Beat	2000	
"Bad Idea"	Go	2012	
"Better Open the Door"	Commit This to Memory	2005	
"Bloodline"	The Same Old Wasted Wonderful World	2025	
"Bomb Pops"	Kids for America	2000	
"Boombox Generation"	I Am the Movie	2003	
"Bottom Feeder"	Go	2012	
"Boxelder"	Go	2012	
"Broken Arrow"	Panic Stations	2015	
"Broken Heart" †	Even If It Kills Me	2007	
"Calling All Cops"	Even If It Kills Me	2007	
"Cambridge"	Kids for America	2000	
"Can't Finish What You Started"	Even If It Kills Me	2007	
"Capital H"	Back to the Beat	2000	
"Carolina" †	"Promenade / Carolina"	1999	
"Circuits and Wires"	Go	2012	
"The Coma Kid"	Go	2012	
"The Conversation"	Even If It Kills Me	2007	
"Crooked Ways" †	Non-album single	2020	
"Days Will Run Away"	Panic Stations	2015	
"Delirium"	My Dinosaur Life	2010	
"A Dip in the Ocean"	Saving for a Custom Van	2020	
"Disappear" †	My Dinosaur Life	2010	
"Don't Call It a Comeback"	I Am the Movie	2003	
"Downer"	The Same Old Wasted Wonderful World	2025	
"Everyone Will Die"	Go	2012	
"Everything Is Alright" †	Commit This to Memory	2005	
"Everything Is Fine"	Panic Stations (Japanese Bonus Track)	2016	
"Even If It Kills Me"	Even If It Kills Me	2007	
"Feel Like Rain"	Commit This to Memory	2005	
"Fell in Love Without You"	Even If It Kills Me	2007	
"Floating Down the River"	Go	2012	
"The Future Freaks Me Out" †	I Am the Movie	2003	
"Give Up/Give In"	Go	2012	
"Gravity"	Panic Stations	2015	
"Hangman"	Commit This to Memory	2005	
"Happy Anniversary"	Go	2012	
"Heavy Boots"	Panic Stations	2015	
"Hello Helicopter"	Even If It Kills Me	2007	
"The Here Away"	Back to the Beat	2000	
"Her Words Destroyed My Planet" †	My Dinosaur Life	2010	
"Here Comes the Sun" •	Minnesota Beatle Project Vol. 3	2011	
"History Lesson"	My Dinosaur Life	2010	
"Hold Me Down" †	Commit This to Memory	2005	
"Hysteria"	My Dinosaur Life	2010	
"I Can Feel You "	Panic Stations	2015	
"Indoor Living"	I Am the Movie	2003	
"Inside Out" †	Non-album single	2013	
"Intersection"	Kids for America	2000	
"Invisible Monsters"	Commit This to Memory (Deluxe Edition)	2006	
"It Had to Be You" †	Even If It Kills Me	2007	
"It's a Pleasure to Meet You" †	Panic Stations	2015	
"It's (Sort of) A Pleasure to Meet You" (with Dan Campbell)	(Sort of) A Song for Patsy Cline / It's (Sort of) a Pleasure to Meet You	2015	
"Last Night"	Even If It Kills Me	2007	
"Left and Leaving" •	Friends	2014	
"L.G. FUAD" †	Commit This to Memory	2005	
"Lose Control" †	Panic Stations	2015	
"Make Out Kids"	Commit This to Memory	2005	
"Major Leagues"	Making Moves Vol. 6	2012	
"Mary Without Sound"	I Am the Movie	2003	
"Melancholia"	The Same Old Wasted Wonderful World	2025	
"Mi Corazón"	The Same Old Wasted Wonderful World	2025	
"Modern Chemistry"	I Am the Movie	2003	
"My Favorite Accident" †	I Am the Movie	2003	
"My Valuable Hunting Knife" •	"The Future Freaks Me Out"	2003	
"Not Asking You to Leave"	Even If It Kills Me	2007	
"Opening Night"	Back to the Beat	2000	
"Over It Now"	Panic Stations	2015	
"Particle Physics" (with Patrick Stump) †	The Same Old Wasted Wonderful World	2025	
"Perfect Teeth"	I Am the Movie	2003	
"Pictures of Success" •	Making Moves Vol. 6	2012	
"Plymouth Rock"	Even If It Kills Me	2007	
"Point of Extinction"	Even If It Kills Me	2007	
"Pop Song 89" •	Punk Goes 80's	2005	
"Promenade" †	"Promenade / Carolina"	1999	
"Pulp Fiction"	My Dinosaur Life	2010	
"Red Dress"	I Am the Movie	2003	
"Resolution"	Commit This to Memory	2005	
"The Same Old Wasted Wonderful World"	The Same Old Wasted Wonderful World	2025	
"The Samurai Code"	Panic Stations	2015	
"Severance"	Making Moves Vol. 6	2012	
"She Is Afraid" †	The Same Old Wasted Wonderful World	2025	
"Shiver"	I Am the Movie	2003	
"Skin and Bones"	My Dinosaur Life	2010	
"So Long Farewell"	My Dinosaur Life	2010	
"Some Wear a Dark Heart"	The Same Old Wasted Wonderful World	2025	
"Son of a Gun"	Go	2012	
"Stand Too Close"	My Dinosaur Life	2010	
"Stop Talking" †	Soundtrack for the film 'Dìdi'	2024	
"Sunday Warning"	Kids for America	2000	
"Sunny Day"	My Dinosaur Life	2010	
"The Sun Woke Up the Whole State" •	Motion City Soundtrack / Limbeck	2004	
"Things Like This" (with Sincere Engineer)	The Same Old Wasted Wonderful World	2025	
"This Is for Real" †	Even If It Kills Me	2007	
"Throw Down"	Back to the Beat	2000	
"Timelines" †	Go	2012	
"Time Turned Fragile"	Commit This to Memory	2005	
"TKO" †	Panic Stations	2015	
"Together We'll Ring in the New Year"	Commit This to Memory	2005	
"True Romance" †	Go	2012	
"Truth Hits Everybody" •	¡Policia!: A Tribute to the Police	2005	
"Waiting" •	Lost Out in the Machinery – Songs of the Rentals	2010	
"Wait So Long" •	Wait So Long / Disappear	2011	
"The Weakends"	My Dinosaur Life	2010	
"When "You're" Around"	Matchbook Romance / Motion City Soundtrack	2004	
"Where I Belong"	Even If It Kills Me	2007	
"Worker Bee"	My Dinosaur Life	2010	
"The Worst Is Yet to Come"	Go	2012	
"The Worst Part..."	Even If It Kills Me	2007	
"You Know Who the Fuck We Are" †	The Same Old Wasted Wonderful World	2025	
"Your Days Are Numbered" (with Mat Kerekes) †	The Same Old Wasted Wonderful World	2025	
