= Panic Stations =

Panic Stations is a term originating from a naval command which may refer to:

- Panic Stations, a 1975 comedy play by Derek Benfield
- Panic Stations, a 1995 novel by Judith Clarke
- Panic Stations, a 2009 collection of cartoons by Sempé
- Panic Stations (album), a 2015 album by American rock band Motion City Soundtrack
- "Panic Station" (song) by English rock band Muse 2013
