= The Same Old Wasted Wonderful World =

Studio album by Motion City Soundtrack
- Released: September 19, 2025
- Studios: Electrical; The Green Room; Reelsounds; Defhaus; Flowers; Diamond City; Interdimensional Breakthrough; Studio Ela; The Wilderness
- Length: 35:31
- Label: Epitaph
- Producer: Sean O'Keefe

Motion City Soundtrack chronology
Panic Stations (2015)	The Same Old Wasted Wonderful World (2025)

Singles from The Same Old Wasted Wonderful World
- 1. "She Is Afraid" Released: June 17, 2025; 2. "You Know Who the Fuck We Are" Released: July 21, 2025

The Same Old Wasted Wonderful World is the seventh studio album by American rock band Motion City Soundtrack. Produced by Sean O'Keefe, the album released on September 19, 2025, by Epitaph Records. The album comes after a protracted, ten-year absence, marking their longest gap between records. The band, mainstays of the 2000s emo scene, decided to disband after their last album, 2015's Panic Stations. They reunited in the 2020s for a series of anniversary tours. The record includes guest vocal spots from Fall Out Boy's Patrick Stump, Citizen's Mat Kerekes, and Sincere Engineer's Deanna Belos.

== Background ==
Motion City Soundtrack rose to prominence at the height of the 2000s emo movement, with their Moog-heavy sound and lyrical themes of anxiety, alienation, and self-destruction. Led by singer-songwriter Justin Pierre, the band had last released an album, Panic Stations, through longtime label Epitaph in 2015. Having toured and recorded for a decade straight, the band announced their breakup the next year, citing exhaustion and personal life changes. They completed a farewell tour mid-2016, ending with a sold-out show in Chicago. Pierre remained active, releasing solo material in the interim.

After a three-year hiatus, the band reunited in 2019, touring domestically in 2020 before the pandemic halted further plans. They resumed activity in 2022, releasing covers and unreleased tracks, and hinting at future music. For a period, they embarked on a series of anniversary tours celebrating their past work, and performed at nostalgia festivals like When We Were Young. In August 2024, they released "Stop Talking", their first original single since 2015, tied to the film Dìdi.

== Recording and release ==
The album was recorded by Sean O'Keefe, a veteran producer who worked with bands like Fall Out Boy, Hawthorne Heights and the Plain White T's; he most recently had been making albums with bands like Beach Bunny. The band had previously worked with O'Keefe back in the 2000s, for split EPs with the bands Matchbook Romance and Schatzi. The Same Old Wasted Wonderful World was tracked at Electrical Audio, Steve Albini's space.

The group announced The Same Old Wasted Wonderful World on June 17, 2025, releasing its lead single "She Is Afraid" alongside a music video inspired by Severance. Reflecting on the new album's creation, guitarist Joshua Cain said it was about reconnecting with what originally made the band special. Frontman Justin Pierre added that, unlike past records focused on personal struggles and confusion, he had since found clarity and a stronger sense of identity through working through those challenges. "You Know Who the Fuck We Are" was released as the album's second single on July 21, 2025.

== Track listing ==
All tracks are written by Motion City Soundtrack (Joshua Cain, Jesse Mack Johnson, Justin Pierre, Matthew Taylor, and Tony Thaxton) except where noted.

The Same Old Wasted Wonderful World track listing
No.	Title	Writer(s)	Length
1.	"Some Wear a Dark Heart"		2:46
2.	"She Is Afraid"	Motion City Soundtrack, Claudio Rivera	3:42
3.	"Particle Physics" (featuring Patrick Stump)	Motion City Soundtrack, Patrick Stump	3:26
4.	"You Know Who the Fuck We Are"		3:05
5.	"Melancholia"		3:05
6.	"Your Days Are Numbered" (featuring Mat Kerekes)	Motion City Soundtrack, Rivera	3:42
7.	"Downer"		3:32
8.	"Mi Corazón"		2:43
9.	"Bloodline"		1:41
10.	"Things Like This" (featuring Deanna Belos of Sincere Engineer)	Motion City Soundtrack, Rivera	3:49
11.	"The Same Old Wasted Wonderful World"		4:00
Total length:			35:31

== Personnel ==
All credits for The Same Old Wasted Wonderful World are adapted from the album's liner notes.

=== Motion City Soundtrack ===
- Joshua Cain – guitars, vocals, keyboards; additional production and engineering (guitar, vocals, keyboards)
- Jesse Mack Johnson – keyboards
- Justin Pierre – vocals, guitars
- Matthew Taylor – bass, vocals, keyboards, percussion; additional production
- Tony Thaxton – drums, vocals, percussion

=== Additional musicians ===
- Patrick Stump – vocals (3)
- Mat Kerekes – vocals (4, 6)
- Deanna Belos – vocals (4, 10)
- Kate Steinberg – vocals (2, 11)
- Melissa Lozada-Oliva – vocals (8)
- Claudio Rivera – songwriting (2, 6, 10)

=== Technical personnel ===
- Sean O'Keefe – production, engineering, mixing
- Jacob Carlson – engineering; slide whistle (2)
- Nick Pilotta – engineering assistance
- Brian Fox – engineering assistance
- Ayad Al Adhamy – additional vocal engineering
- Daniel Buettner – paintings
- Ben Pier – photography
- Jason Link – layout

== Charts ==
Chart performance for The Same Old Wasted Wonderful World
Chart (2025)	Peak position
UK Album Downloads (Official Charts)	72
UK Independent Album Breakers (OCC)	20
US Top Album Sales (Billboard)	37
