= In the Drink (disambiguation) =

In the Drink may refer to:

- In the Drink, a 1999 novel by Kate Christensen
- "In the Drink", song by the Barenaked Ladies from Born on a Pirate Ship
- In the Drink, a solo album by Justin Pierre
