= In the Drink =

Studio album by Justin Courtney Pierre
- Released: October 12, 2018
- Studio: Interdimensional Breakthrough Sound
- Genre: Indie rock; pop punk
- Length: 26:58
- Label: Epitaph
- Producer: Joshua Cain

Justin Courtney Pierre chronology
In the Drink (2018)	Open Mic at the Lo-Fi Vol. 1 (2019)

In the Drink is the debut studio album by American singer-songwriter Justin Courtney Pierre. Produced by Joshua Cain, the album was released on October 12, 2018 in the United States by Epitaph Records. Pierre was previously known as the frontman of indie rock group Motion City Soundtrack, which formed in 1997 and released six albums, also mainly on Epitaph. After the band went on a break in 2016 and re-emerged in 2019, Pierre settled into family life and began developing In the Drink. It was recorded with his former bandmate Joshua Cain.

== Background ==
The origins of Pierre's first solo effort lie in the dissolution of his former group, Motion City Soundtrack. The band, over their nearly twenty-year career, toured heavily and released six studio albums, the majority on independent label Epitaph Records. By 2016, much of the members were starting families and found time spent touring less desirable. They announced a farewell tour, which culminated in a career-spanning set at Chicago's Metro in September 2016. Following that show, Pierre returned to his hometown of Minneapolis and settled into home life with his wife and daughter. He entered therapy, gained weight, and considered options for his future. He briefly considered becoming an accountant, but was drawn back to music within a short time.

In the Drink was recorded over a period of seven months, and was produced by Pierre's former bandmate, Joshua Cain, and recorded at his studio, Interdimensional Breakthrough Sound. Cain had developed his skills as a producer over the years, and due to their history, it was natural to reconnect with him for the project. Pierre plays every instrument on the album, aside from the trumpet and drums, which were played by David Jarnstrom of Gratitude.

== Release and reception ==
In the Drink was announced on July 31, 2018. Pierre returned to Epitaph Records to distribute the release. The album was a promoted with a series of music videos, the first of which was influenced by French New Wave cinema, with the rest interconnected in an ethereal sense.

== Track listing ==
All tracks are written by Justin Courtney Pierre.

In the Drink
No.	Title	Length
1.	"Undone"	2:48
2.	"Anchor"	2:40
3.	"I Don't Know Why She Ran Away"	2:09
4.	"Moonbeam"	2:21
5.	"Ready Player One"	2:30
6.	"I'm a Liar"	4:27
7.	"Sooner"	3:24
8.	"Shoulder the Weight"	2:26
9.	"In the Drink"	1:41
10.	"Goodnight Hiroyuki"	2:31

== Personnel ==
Credits adapted from the album's liner notes.

- Justin Pierre – lead vocals, guitar, songwriting, art direction
- David Jarnstrom – drums
- Molly Solomon – backing vocals
- Jenny O'Neill – backing vocals
- Joshua Cain – producer, engineer
- Jacob Carlson – drum engineer
- Marc McClusky – mixing
- Jason Link – layout
- Greg Calbi – mastering
