= Go (Motion City Soundtrack album) =

Studio album by Motion City Soundtrack
- Released: June 12, 2012
- Recorded: June–October 2011; Flowers (Minneapolis, Minnesota)
- Genres: Alternative rock; indie rock
- Length: 38:07
- Labels: Epitaph; The Boombox Generation
- Producers: Ed Ackerson; Motion City Soundtrack

Motion City Soundtrack chronology
| My Dinosaur Life (2010) | Go (2012) | Panic Stations (2015) |

Singles from Go
- 1. "True Romance" Released: April 13, 2012; 2. "Timelines" Released: May 22, 2012

Go is the fifth studio album by American rock band Motion City Soundtrack. Produced by Ed Ackerson and the band, the album was released on June 12, 2012, in the United States by Epitaph Records and the band's own label, The Boombox Generation. Previously, the group had released their major-label debut, My Dinosaur Life (2010) on Columbia; the band parted ways with the label due to the record's lackluster commercial response. Following this, the band returned to their home of Minneapolis, Minnesota, with producer and longtime friend Ackerson. The band entered a local studio and recorded their next effort on their own time and finances. The band recorded Go without a label, and put it upon themselves to pay for mixing and mastering and have conversations with distributors later.

Frontman Justin Pierre composed the lyrics for Go, which is themed around mortality, growing older, and learning to live in the moment. The reflective tone includes subjects such as procrastination, relationship miscommunication, and optimism, but also personal struggles such as the death of loved ones. Many songs on Go were developed over years at a time, and several date to the band's first few studio albums. Musically, the album retains the band's pop-rock, Moog-based sound, with a heavier emphasis on electronic experimentation. Following the album's recording, the band entered talks with Epitaph Records, where they were signed from 2003 to 2008. Discussions with label founder Brett Gurewitz led the band to re-sign with Epitaph, who co-released Go alongside the band's own label, The Boombox Generation. It is the final album by the band to feature long-time drummer Tony Thaxton before he announced his departure on March, 20th, 2013.

Go received mixed reviews from contemporary music critics, and peaked at number eight on Billboard's Independent Albums chart. "True Romance" was the album's lead single, and featured a one-shot music video reminiscent of the works of Spike Jonze.

== Background ==
In 2010, Motion City Soundtrack released their fourth studio album, My Dinosaur Life, on Columbia Records. The band had signed to the label two years prior, and it was the band's major-label debut. The album peaked at number 15 on the Billboard 200, representing a career best, and earned strong reviews. However, Columbia dropped the band later that year, with the commercial performance of My Dinosaur Life leading to the split. "I guess we didn't do as well as they hoped or expected us to," said Pierre that year. "And we felt that having all their resources at our disposal would perhaps propel us into another dimension. But we are what we are regardless of what label or machine is behind us. We did exceptionally well, though, if you want to look strictly at sales numbers in today's climate."

== Recording and production ==
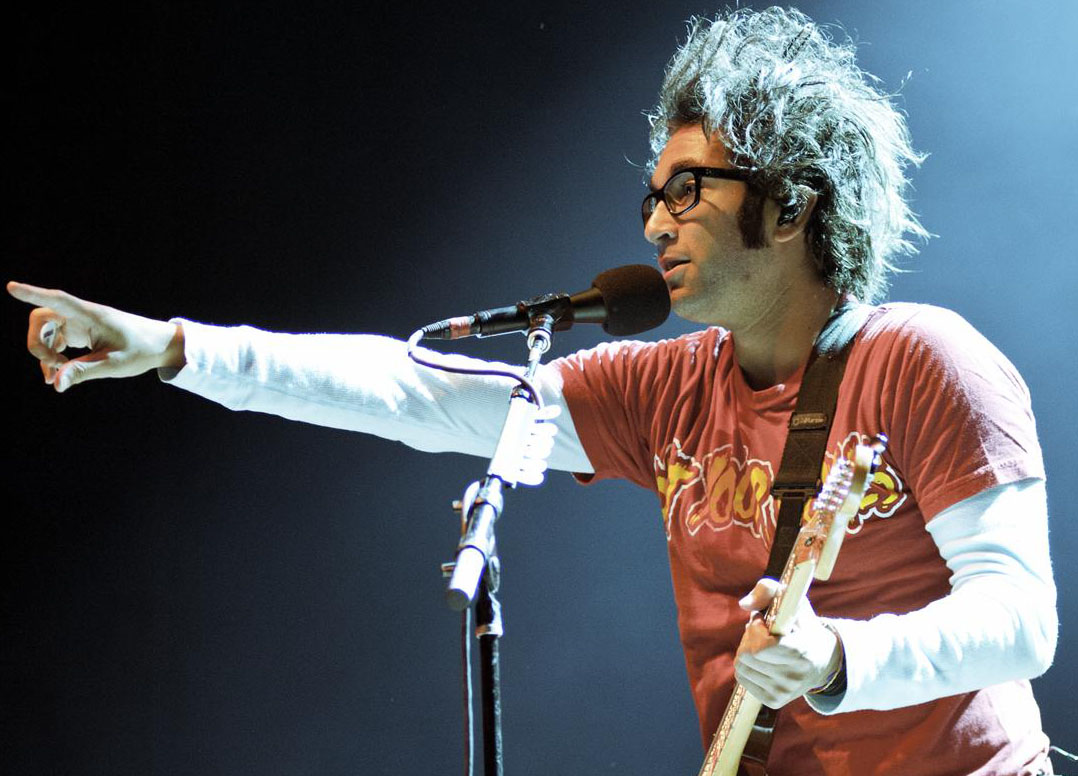
Lead vocalist Justin Pierre penned the album's lyrics on learning to live in the moment.

Go was recorded with Ackerson from June to October 2011 at his studio, Flowers Studio, in the band's home of Minneapolis, Minnesota. The band recorded on their own time with their own resources, which both provided comfort and a sense of nervous to the group. Typically, for an album such as their previous effort, the band would head to Los Angeles with booked studio time, balancing the schedules of producers, on budget with a set timeline. The band did not sit down and preconceive the album as a change in style, but rather relaxed and took their time writing it. "This time we just felt like it was like we were just taking our time and just kinda living life and not worrying about too much other than getting together and making music," remarked Taylor. "Before we would just work on material, make edits, add guitars and then finish. On this record, we kind of worked on a song and then decided to work on a new idea to come up with something," said Cain.

Ackerson was not worried with the album being perfect; for example, when Pierre forgot to record a lyric at the studio, he recorded it on his computer and sent it to Ackerson, who simply added reverb and mixed it into the recording. The band at the time considered their work on Go a step further than anything they had done prior, which included hiring a live string ensemble to perform. The band finished 16–17 songs, using 11 for the album and the remainder for B-sides and bonus tracks.

Pierre has since looked back on Go with mixed emotions; he later cited it as his personal least favorite album by the band. He remembered the band were "burnt out and miserable" while recording, noting that drummer Thaxton left the band a year later due to depression. He personally was struggling with dark thoughts as well: " I was thinking about death a lot and had a lot of back pain and was grumpy and it was winter. [...] A lot of people who were close to me died around that time and I just felt this strange floating sensation like I was sleepwalking through life. It wasn't bad or good, it was just weird and I feel like that somehow translated to that record."

== Music ==
=== Composition and lyrics ===
The album's themes include mortality and growing older, or, as Taylor described it, "just realizing, 'I'm not as young as I used to be, what am I going to do with myself? I don't have eternity to stay here so I need to get up and do something and make it worthwhile'—whatever that means." Pierre's lyricism includes a mix of fact and fiction, which is intended to leave the listener guessing. The album's tone is reflective, which was spurred from Pierre having time to sit at home to write and think. He looked at his relationship with lead guitarist Joshua Cain, noting that the two had written and played music together for 15 years at that point. Pierre felt "overwhelmed with the eventual demise of everything," and considered the fact that "nothing lasts forever" is one of the album's most important points. Occasionally, Pierre's lyricism was considered too personal or dark by other members. One lyric from "Timelines", paraphrased by Pierre in an interview as "rushing into every pore, the whiskey stench of open sores", was changed to "scattered seeds of sycamore," as Cain found the lyric gross, noting it "literally made [his] stomach sick."

Musically, "there are still some simple four-chord pop or rock songs, but there's a lot of experimental, electronic noise as well," said Pierre. He considered the album's centerpiece, "Everyone Will Die", reminiscent of "Disarm" by the Smashing Pumpkins. Pierre began to adapt to more contemporary technology, such as recording on his own and sending files to other members, which helped the process considerably.

=== Songs ===
I put my heart and soul into everything I do, so it's hard when four guys are saying, 'Let's try something else.' But I've been more open to figuring out a way to make everybody happy as opposed to just me. I'm a very stubborn person. I like what I do and to be told to rewrite a song, I see as a challenge. […] It's okay to have mistakes and imperfections, rather than us trying to be perfect.

— Justin Pierre on growing during the recording process

"Circuits and Wires" originated during sessions for the band's 2010 album, My Dinosaur Life, and nearly became a B-side for Go before it was decided it had the energy the band hoped to open the album with. "True Romance" was recorded late into the process; drums for the entire album had already been recorded and the group's drummer, Tony Thaxton, was to be leaving town on a plane the very next day; he tracked drums two hours prior to his flight. "Son of a Gun" was described as "just a quirky love song about a guy who doesn't really get it." Cain's guitar solo was written as a joke of sorts, but was eventually kept on the record which Cain later found amusing. "Timelines" is directly autobiographical, covering Pierre's beginnings in Catholic school, a stuttering problem, and losing his virginity at 17. It was developed from an acoustic guitar lick Cain created while on tour; the initial eight bars of the song were recorded and quickly forgotten about. Taylor later found the file when sifting through his computer, and the band tackled the song from there. The influence behind the lyrics came from Pierre's father. "Something my Dad used to always say to me, he would just say, 'J, it's all about timing. Being at the right place at the right time.'"

"Everyone Will Die" ("a celebration of life, not necessarily a death song," said Pierre) was first recorded as a scratch demo on the band's tour bus, and the original vocal track from that recording was kept for the album version, as it represented the emotion the band were striving for. A string section was employed for the bridge. "Having real strings was like a dream come true for me. I've always wanted to arrange parts, and I finally got to," said Taylor. "The Coma Kid" relates to procrastination: "The Coma Kid...somebody who's unable to 'do.' Somebody who's thinking of 'doing,' but not actually 'doing.'" The song was described as a throwback of sorts to "Modern Chemistry", a track from the band's debut, I Am The Movie. "Boxelder" was written uniquely, in an attempt to break songwriting routine; as a result, the song switches between time signatures, going from seven to four-four during the chorus. "A boxelder needs the tree to live, because they infest the trees, but for them to live they end up killing the tree, and [Justin] relates that to a relationship, which I think is very interesting," said Johnson. "The Worst Is Yet to Come" dates as far back as 2009, and was recorded in the span of one day. Tony Thaxton was not involved in the initial writing due to an arm infection, which also was an issue in the recording process of My Dinosaur Life. Because of his absence, Claudio Rivera of Saves the Day, who would later replace Thaxton after his departure from the band, stood in as the drummer for the original demo; Thaxton's drum part was developed later and is present on the album. Likewise, "Bad Ideas" is the oldest song on the album, first attempted during sessions for 2005's Commit This to Memory.

"Happy Anniversary" is written from the point of view of a dying loved one, which Pierre based on his grandmother, who died several years prior of cancer. "[The song] is basically [...] from the person's point of view who is dying, and all of the things that they can't necessarily say to the person that they're leaving behind," remarked Pierre. The event occurred in late 2009, shortly after the band had learned of a "big break, this big opportunity," which Pierre skipped out on to go see his ailing grandmother. "It was a weird experience being with this shell of a woman that I used to know. She couldn't move or communicate," he later said; she passed the next morning. He noted that had he not gone, he would not have had another experience with her, which factored into the song's lyrics to live in the moment. The band considered it the darkest on the album. The song was so personal, it affected the group recording the song. "The song gives me shivers. I couldn't sing the song [...] I kept breaking down every time I tried to sing it. It was really weird," said Pierre. Pierre interpreted the final song on the album, "Floating Down the River", as a celebration of his newfound excitement for life.

== Release and reception ==
Professional ratings
Review scores
| Source | Rating |
|---|---|
| AllMusic | 3/5 stars |
| Alternative Press | 4/5 stars |
| Punknews.org | 4/5 stars |
| Spin | 5/10 |

Following the recording of Go, the band set out on the "4 Albums. 2 Nights. 7 Cities" tour, which found the band performing their past discography over two nights. During that time period, they searched for the label to release Go, which was being mixed at the time. Several labels were interested from samples the band sent them. Another plan the band had was to pay entirely for mastering and manufacturing, and to then find a distributor. The band took meetings with various label heads, including with Brett Gurewitz, former Bad Religion guitarist and head of Epitaph Records, where the band was signed from 2003 to 2008. It was clear from the first meeting that the band would return to their "first home," with Pierre noting that, "We had always enjoyed working with [Epitaph] and we loved the people there. We were taking meetings, but once we were hanging out with Brett, we got right back into the swing of things."

Go received mixed reviews from contemporary music critics. "The scenes may change, but the Soundtrack remains the same: sweet, flawed, sort-of-optimistic emo-pop," said Kory Grow of Spin. Gregory Heaney of AllMusic wrote that while previous effort My Dinosaur Life was a summer record released in winter, Go is the exact opposite; he also complimented the band's poppier sound, noting, "Once fans shift into the proper gear, [Go] really shows that these guys are capable of something more expansive than anything they've done before." Jason Pettigrew of Alternative Press opined that Pierre's neurotic lyricism took on a more sophisticated form, summarizing that, "On Go, Motion City Soundtrack have successfully navigated both personal and aesthetic maturity, making this a win-win situation for themselves and fans."

== Track listing ==
All lyrics written by Justin Pierre; all music composed by Motion City Soundtrack.

1. "Circuits and Wires" – 3:07
2. "True Romance" – 3:21
3. "Son of a Gun" – 3:20
4. "Timelines" – 4:04
5. "Everyone Will Die" – 2:46
6. "The Coma Kid" – 3:30
7. "Boxelder" – 3:20
8. "The Worst Is Yet to Come" – 3:56
9. "Bad Idea" – 3:04
10. "Happy Anniversary" – 4:17
11. "Floating Down the River" – 3:09

=== Deluxe edition bonus tracks ===
1. "Bottom Feeder" – 3:21
2. "Give Up/Give In" – 3:39
3. "Alcohol Eyes" – 2:57

== Personnel ==
Credits adapted from the album's liner notes.

Motion City Soundtrack

- Justin Pierre – lead vocals, guitar
- Joshua Cain – guitar, vocals
- Jesse Johnson – Moog, keyboard
- Matt Taylor – bass guitar, keyboards, programming, string arrangements on "Everyone Will Die"
- Tony Thaxton – drums, percussion

Additional musicians

- Dan Lawonn – cello on "Everyone Will Die"
- Erica Burton – viola on "Everyone Will Die"
- Josh Misner – violin on "Everyone Will Die"
- Zachary Scanlan – violin on "Everyone Will Die"
- The Laurels String Quartet – strings

Production

- Ed Ackerson – production, engineer
- Chris Shaw – mixing engineer
- Peter Anderson – assistant engineer
- Bradley Hale – art direction, design
- Sue Marcus – publicity
- Geoff Meall – booking
- Ron Opaleski – booking
- Josh Newman – management
- Doug Lefrak – management
- Greg Calbi – mastering engineer

== Charts ==
| Chart (2012) | Peak position |
|---|---|
| Australian Albums (ARIA) | 84 |
| US Top Alternative Albums (Billboard) | 8 |
| US Independent Albums (Billboard) | 8 |
| US Top Rock Albums (Billboard) | 21 |
| US Billboard 200 | 46 |
