= True Romance (Motion City Soundtrack song) =

Single by Motion City Soundtrack

from the album Go
- Released: April 13, 2012
- Recorded: June–October 2011; Flowers Studio (Minneapolis, Minnesota)
- Genre: Emo, pop punk, indie rock
- Length: 3:22
- Label: Epitaph
- Songwriter(s): Joshua Cain, Jesse Johnson, Matthew Taylor, Tony Thaxton, Justin Pierre
- Producer(s): Ed Ackerson

Motion City Soundtrack singles chronology
"Wait So Long" (2011)	"True Romance" (2012)	"Timelines" (2012)

"True Romance" is a song by American rock band Motion City Soundtrack, released on April 13, 2012 as the lead single from the group's fifth studio album, Go (2012). The song's music video was released on June 12, 2012.

== Background ==
The song originated from Joshua Cain, who brought the song to the band late in the recording process, but struggled to expand the idea into what he wanted. The song came together gradually, much like the recording process for Go. The band's bass guitarist, Matthew Taylor, regarding the recording process, says that "there's always a certain point for me, and I think Josh too, during recording, we start to sift through every idea we have." Taylor sent Cain a mock keyboard part he had written for "True Romance", and both decided at the last minute that the track should be recorded and considered for the album. However, drums for the entire album had already been recorded and the group's drummer, Tony Thaxton, was to be leaving town on a plane the very next day. That next morning, two hours before Thaxton's flight, he came into the studio and tracked drums for "True Romance". Jesse Johnson, the group's keyboard player, acknowledges the absurdity of the task they were putting before Thaxton by saying, "You gotta go play another song, that you haven't really heard, and don't know how it goes, and haven't written a part, but go do it. And you have an hour".

Regarding the meaning of the song, the lead vocalist, Justin Pierre, said "'True Romance' is a love song about two people who seemingly don't have much in common except their love for the time they share in the bedroom. In my experience, opposites do attract. And if you can get over the superficialities, you often find you have more in common than you initially thought. Perhaps you even find love."

== Music video ==
The song's music video, directed by Cain's brother Jesse Caine, is a one shot clip that involved "upwards of 30 people behind the scenes, running up and down the street, stopping traffic, moving cars, running around." While also being filmed backwards. The video features adult film star Kleio Valentien. The clip took 15 takes to perfect. "Growing up in the 1990s, with guys like Spike Jonze always doing these one-take video, it's just always been fun to watch," said Pierre. "If you do it well, no one notices how much work goes into it."

== Personnel ==
Motion City Soundtrack

- Justin Pierre – lead vocals, guitar
- Joshua Cain – guitar, vocals
- Jesse Johnson – Moog, keyboard
- Matt Taylor – bass guitar, percussion
- Tony Thaxton – drums

Production

- Ed Ackerson – producer
