= My Favorite Accident =

Single by Motion City Soundtrack

from the album I Am the Movie
- Released: 9 December 2003 (Europe)
- Recorded: 2003
- Genre: Pop punk, emo
- Length: 3:20
- Label: Epitaph
- Songwriter(s): Joshua Cain, Jesse Johnson, Matthew Taylor, Tony Thaxton, Justin Pierre
- Producer(s): Ed Rose

Motion City Soundtrack singles chronology
"The Future Freaks Me Out" (2003)	"My Favorite Accident" (2003)	"Everything Is Alright" (2005)

"My Favorite Accident" is a song by the pop punk band Motion City Soundtrack. It features on their debut album, I Am the Movie and was released as their second single in Europe. This song was featured in the video game Burnout 3: Takedown, and also featured in Tony Hawks Gigantic Skatepark Tour along with "The Future Freaks Me Out".

== Formats and track listings ==
- CD
  1. "My Favorite Accident" - 3:20
  2. "Boombox Generation" - 3:07

== Music video ==
The video for "My Favorite Accident" was shot at Joshua Cain's brother's home on a very limited budget, and has been noted for "poking fun at your usual music video relationship". The video features frontman Justin Pierre going through a rough patch in his relationship with a large pink bunny rabbit. It also includes the band's moog player, Jesse Johnson, doing his now famous "moogstand", where he does a handstand on his moog synthesizer.
