= Panic Stations (album) =

Studio album by Motion City Soundtrack
- Released: September 18, 2015
- Recorded: June 2014
- Studios: Pachyderm (Cannon Falls, Minnesota)
- Genres: Pop punk; alternative rock; indie rock
- Length: 38:33
- Label: Epitaph
- Producers: John Agnello; Mike Sapone (additional)

Motion City Soundtrack chronology
Go (2012)	Panic Stations (2015)	The Same Old Wasted Wonderful World (2025)

Singles from Panic Stations
- 1. "TKO" Released: June 16, 2015; 2. "Lose Control" Released: August 3, 2015; 3. "It's a Pleasure to Meet You" Released: August 31, 2015

Panic Stations is the sixth studio album by American rock band Motion City Soundtrack. Produced by John Agnello, the album was released on September 18, 2015, by Epitaph Records. Following an extended touring cycle in which the group performed several past albums in full, Motion City Soundtrack lost one of its longest-serving members: drummer Tony Thaxton, who resigned from the group in 2013. The band continued to tour with new drummer Claudio Rivera over the ensuing year while writing new material for a sixth album.

Recorded at Pachyderm Studio in Cannon Falls, Minnesota, the album was tracked live, in a departure from the group's previous albums. The group lived together at the studio and completed its recording process in 14 days, the band's shortest time spent on an album. Upon its release, Panic Stations attracted positive reviews from music critics, but it debuted low on the charts in the U.S. and Australia. The following year, they announced their dissolution and a farewell tour, but they reunited in 2019.

== Background ==
Following the recording of Go (2012), the band set out on the "4 Albums. 2 Nights. 7 Cities" tour, which found the band performing the group's past discography over two nights. During that time period, the group searched for the label to release Go, which was being mixed at the time. The band took meetings with various label heads, but eventually returned to Epitaph Records at the behest of label founder Brett Gurewitz. Go received mixed reviews from contemporary music critics, and it charted much lower than the group's prior releases at number 45 on the Billboard 200. Drummer Tony Thaxton departed the group in March 2013 following battles with tour-related depression. The band enlisted longtime friend Claudio Rivera of Saves the Day as the group's new drummer, and released a one-off single with him, "Inside Out", in celebration.

The band embarked on a tour celebrating the tenth anniversary of Commit This to Memory between January and February 2015, playing the album in its entirety. The group later extended this anniversary tour, and further toured the album between June and August 2015.

== Recording and production ==
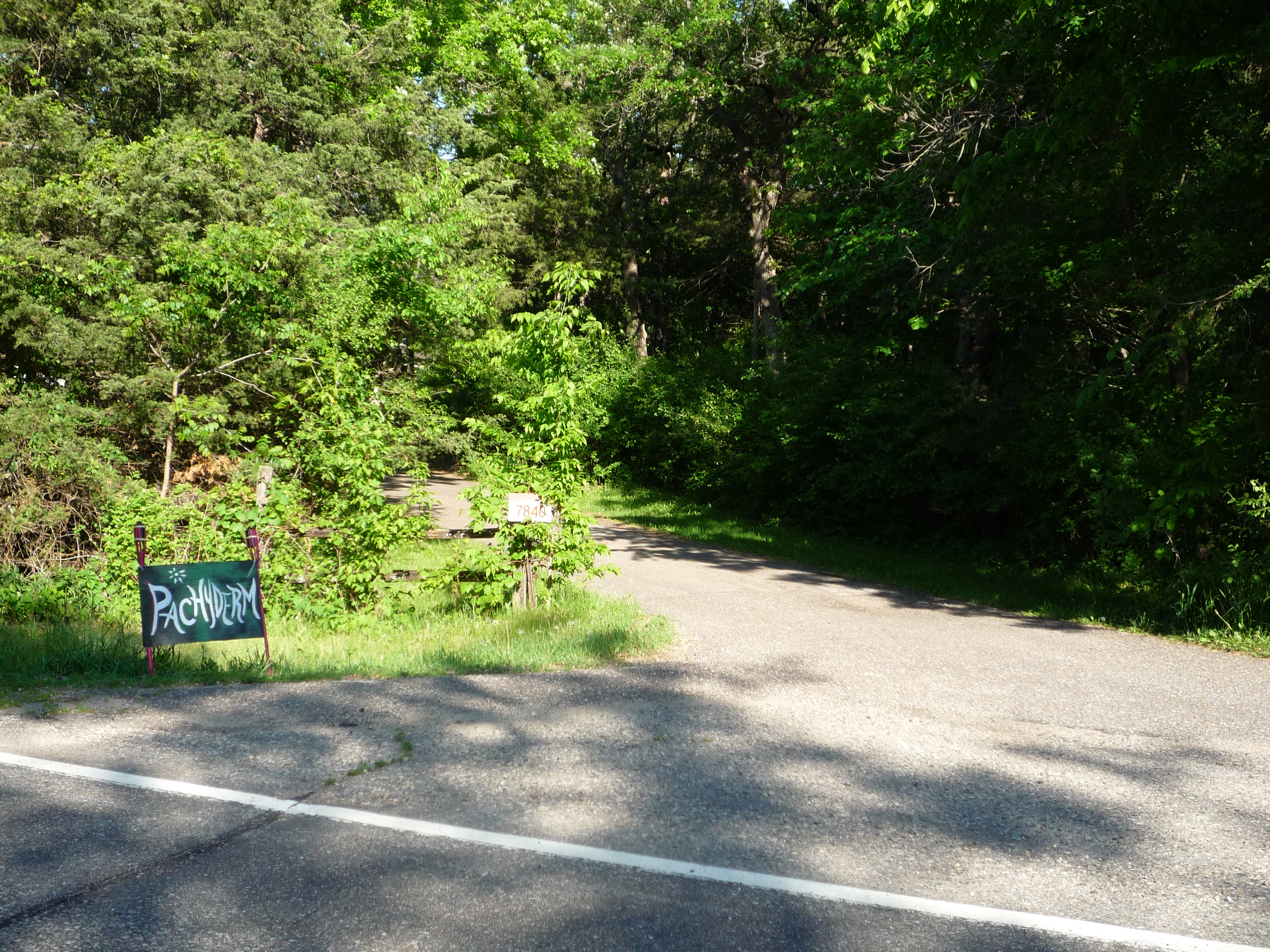
Sign and driveway for the secluded Pachyderm Studio, located in an old-growth forest.

The group recorded Panic Stations over two weeks at Pachyderm Studio in Cannon Falls, Minnesota in June 2014. Pachyderm, a studio best known for recording artists such as PJ Harvey, Superchunk, and, most famously, Nirvana's In Utero (1993), was in a state of disrepair for many years. John Kuker purchased it out of foreclosure in 2011, and he and engineer Nick Tveitbakk remodeled the home over three years. Motion City Soundtrack was one of the first bands to record in the newly revamped Pachyderm. Pierre considered it a "magical" place to record, due to its associations with Nirvana. Additional production was contributed by engineer and record producer Mike Sapone.

For the album, the group collaborated with producer John Agnello, well known for his work with Dinosaur Jr., Walt Mink, and Sonic Youth. For the band's previous few records, the band's songwriting methods involved sending audio files back and forth to one another. Panic Stations was an attempt to break away from that method by writing songs together rather than apart. The band was engulfed in writing for the album in the second half of 2013, and were nearly set to record that October before there was an undisclosed setback. The band entered the studio with dozens of song ideas, "maybe 50 in total," according to Pierre. Agnello advised the band to track the entire album live, a request that the band members had received from friends for many years. The process was designed to capture the energy of the group's live performances; as a result, the group was less critical of musical mistakes in recording in the interest of just having fun. The five members and Agnello lived together while creating the record at Pachyderm.

Pierre spoke on the "back-to-basics" approach of creating Panic Stations:

When we were all younger it was like we just wrote and made music. We would get together in the practice space and just start playing. Somebody would start and everyone else would join in. And we started overthinking everything slowly over time. This was about trying to forget everything we'd learned and going back to the fresh, new feeling. Once the music is written and recorded, you can get back to the other, more complicated aspects of being in a band.

The band came to the studio well-rehearsed and often recorded songs in one take. The recording process was completed in 14 days, marking the shortest time the group had spent recording an album.

== Reception ==
Upon its release, Panic Stations received positive reviews from music critics. On Metacritic, the album achieved an average score of 80 out of 100 based on five reviews, signifying "generally favorable reviews".

Colin McGuire of PopMatters characterized the music as a "burst of energy," noting that "There's an assurance here that hasn't been present on the band's previous sets, and at the end of the day, it has provided an essential layer to a rock formula that needed forward movement to survive in the first place." Jonathan Diener of Alternative Press deemed it their "most straightforward release," commenting, "Although the lovable weirdness seems absent this time around, fans will be in for a solid and consistent rock album from start to finish." Rod Yates, of the Australian edition of Rolling Stone, felt it "one of the best records of their career." The Daily Breeze's Sam Gnerre was effusive, describing the record as "11 slices of brilliant, fully realized bursts of unstoppable energy" that "sounds fresher in sound and spirit than any of the band's prior albums."

== Track listing ==
All tracks are written by Motion City Soundtrack.

No.	Title	Length
1.	"Anything at All"	2:40
2.	"TKO"	3:38
3.	"I Can Feel You"	4:47
4.	"Lose Control"	2:31
5.	"Heavy Boots"	3:01
6.	"It's a Pleasure to Meet You"	3:43
7.	"Over It Now"	2:46
8.	"Broken Arrow"	3:11
9.	"Gravity"	2:59
10.	"The Samurai Code"	3:54
11.	"Days Will Run Away"	5:23

== Personnel ==
Motion City Soundtrack

- Justin Pierre – lead vocals, guitar, keyboards
- Joshua Cain – guitar, vocals
- Jesse Johnson – Moog, keyboards, vocals
- Matt Taylor – bass guitar, vocals, keyboards, programming, percussion
- Claudio Rivera – drums, percussion, vocals, keyboards

Production

- John Agnello – production, engineering
- Mike Sapone – additional production
- Nick Tvietbakk – additional engineering
- Marc McClusky – mixing
- Howie Weinberg – mastering
- Gentry Studer – assistant mastering

== Charts ==
Chart (2015)	Peak position
Australian Albums (ARIA)	80
US Top Alternative Albums (Billboard)	18
US Independent Albums (Billboard)	22
US Top Rock Albums (Billboard)	28
US Billboard 200	141
