= I Am the Movie =

I Am The Movie

Studio album by Motion City Soundtrack
- Released: June 24, 2003
- Recorded: February 2002 – January 2003
- Studios: Black Lodge, Eudora, Kansas
- Genres: Pop punk; alternative rock; emo
- Length: 43:03
- Label: Epitaph
- Producer: Ed Rose

Motion City Soundtrack chronology
Back to the Beat (2000)	I Am The Movie (2003)	Commit This to Memory (2005)

Original cover

Singles from I Am the Movie
- 1. "The Future Freaks Me Out" Released: November 17, 2003; 2. "My Favorite Accident" Released: December 9, 2003

Professional ratings
Review scores
Source	Rating
AllMusic	2.5/5 stars
IGN	7.5/10 stars
musicOMH	Favorable
Punknews.org	(2002) (2003)

I Am the Movie is the debut studio album by American rock band Motion City Soundtrack, released on June 24, 2003, through Epitaph Records. The band had recorded several EPs prior to recording a full-length album, and their first attempts at doing so were unsuccessful.

The album was originally recorded in 10 days at Black Lodge Studios in Eudora, Kansas, with producer Ed Rose in February 2002. The band found the sessions stressful considering the lack of time. They started distributing the album in mid-2002 at their concerts (in the form of a CD hand-packaged inside a floppy disk) and online. The group attracted attention from several labels by the end of the year and signed with independent label Epitaph in January 2003. They returned to Black Lodge for additional recording and remixing, with new bassist Matthew Taylor dubbing over the original bassist's parts, who had since left the band.

Epitaph's version of the album—which included four new songs—was released on June 24, 2003, to critical acclaim. In the U.S., the album peaked at number 42 on Billboard's Independent Albums chart. It was supported by the singles "My Favorite Accident" and "The Future Freaks Me Out".

== Background ==
Motion City Soundtrack was formed in Minneapolis, Minnesota, in 1997 by singer-songwriter Justin Pierre and guitarist Joshua Cain, who had previously played in a number of bands. The band went through several lineup changes. Through these, Cain and Pierre would often have to take over keyboard duties during shows. The group's first release was a 7-inch single, "Promenade / Carolina", released in 1999. Their next two releases, both extended plays—Kids for America and Back to the Beat—were released the following year.

Over the course of the early 2000s, the band continued to tour and shuffle through members. In late 2001, while touring in Milton, Pennsylvania with the band Submerge, they convinced two of its members—bassist Matthew Taylor and drummer Tony Thaxton—to join Motion City. The band originally recorded an album prior to making I Am the Movie that they were unsatisfied with. The members of the band Ultimate Fakebook, with whom Motion City would often play shows, suggested they employ producer Ed Rose. They sent the original album to Rose in hopes of salvaging some material, but he advised them to just start over. Jesse Johnson, a friend and co-worker of Cain's, joined the band as keyboardist just three weeks before the band recorded the album. Johnson had never played the keyboard before but Cain taught him the parts that had already been written.

== Recording and production ==
I Am the Movie was recorded at Red House Studios (later known as Black Lodge Recording) in Eudora, Kansas in February 2002 with producer Ed Rose, who also engineered and mixed the recordings. During their time in Eudora, the band stayed at a $100 a night two-bedroom apartment owned by Red House. "There were a bunch of mattresses thrown on the floor and we were living up there in one room," guitarist Josh Cain remembered. The title of the album came from Cain's older brother, Brian. Pierre considered each song from the album like a scene from a film, and he considered the title a joke on him. Austin Lindstrom originally recorded bass guitar on the album.

The bulk of the album was recorded over a ten-day period. Due to the short amount of time they had to record, several choruses on the album feature copy-and-pasted (or duplicated) vocal tracks. The sessions with Rose were difficult; he would insult the members if they made a mistake. "It was a combination because he had some weird sort of back surgery that week; we sucked as musicians and thought we could do the whole album in ten days," Pierre recalled. Though they budgeted for a $4,000 recording, the original version of I Am the Movie ended up costing $6,000 to make.

== Release ==
I Am the Movie was first released in the summer of 2002, as a hand-packaged floppy disk; the band cut open floppy disks and packed a CD-R inside. These were available on the band's website and at their concerts. Pierre estimated that 3,000 copies of this edition were sold. By the end of 2002, the band began receiving offers from various record labels, including Universal, Triple Crown Records, and Drive-Thru Records, and they performed at industry showcases. Meanwhile, Brett Gurewitz, founder of Epitaph Records, learned of the band from members of the group Matchbook Romance. He attended four of their shows in Los Angeles that Pierre later regarded as among his worst, as his voice was poor from constant touring. While they were interested in Universal, they chose to sign to Epitaph as they felt the contract was less restrictive and more honest. Eli Janney from Girls Against Boys helped the band secure management and a lawyer. Motion City became part of a slew of Epitaph signings, including Matchbook Romance, Scatter the Ashes and From First to Last, amid concerns the Southern California label had strayed too far from its roots, and seemed "a little too emo."

With more time and money available, the band returned to Red House for additional recording over a period of 12 days. Taylor re-recorded the bass lines for the entire album, while Pierre recorded more vocals and Johnson added more keyboard parts. They also took more time to properly mix the album, as they were unsatisfied with the hurried original mix. Prior to signing with Epitaph, the band wrote and recorded three new songs—"Perfect Teeth", "Modern Chemistry", and "Autographs & Apologies". These were initially slated for a split EP with Reggie and the Full Effect and Ultimate Fakebook which never saw release. They also recorded a new version of "Capital H", as they did not like how the original sounded. Epitaph chose the aforementioned songs for inclusion on the re-released I Am the Movie, while also cutting "1000 Paper Cranes" from the track listing to repurpose as a B-side. Don C. Tyler mastered the recordings at Precision Mastering in Hollywood, California.

Epitaph re-released I Am the Movie on June 24, 2003. The song "The Future Freaks Me Out" was released to radio on September 16, 2003, accompanied by a music video with allusions to the movie Rushmore. It is set as a school play with several different scenes including the old west, an office, ocean, a funeral and a concert. It is the second music video the band made. The guitarist Joshua Cain's family helped in the making of it, and star in it as well.

Three different versions of this album exist. The original, unsigned release had eleven tracks. The first two versions of the album were housed in 5¼" floppy discs and their respective paper sleeves. The second floppy disc release also contains a credit card with a track listing. Four new tracks were added for the Epitaph release. These new tracks replaced "1000 Paper Cranes", which is not found in the regular version (but is included as a "bonus track" on the vinyl LP, briefly available from the band's website, and on the Japanese import).

== Track listing ==
All songs written by Motion City Soundtrack.

=== Original release ===
1. "Cambridge" – 2:30
2. "Shiver" – 2:54
3. "The Future Freaks Me Out" – 3:37
4. "Indoor Living" – 3:45
5. "My Favorite Accident" – 3:21
6. "Boombox Generation" – 3:11
7. "Don't Call It a Comeback" – 1:51
8. "The Red Dress" – 2:37
9. "Mary Without Sound" – 3:00
10. "1000 Paper Cranes" – 2:29
11. "A.O.K." – 3:39

=== Epitaph release ===
1. "Cambridge" – 2:30
2. "Shiver" – 2:54
3. "The Future Freaks Me Out" – 3:36
4. "Indoor Living" – 3:47
5. "My Favorite Accident" – 3:20
6. "Perfect Teeth" – 3:29*
7. "Boombox Generation" – 3:07
8. "Don't Call It a Comeback" – 1:51
9. "Modern Chemistry" – 2:22*
10. "Capital H" – 2:52*
11. "Red Dress" – 2:36
12. "Mary Without Sound" – 3:00
13. "Autographs & Apologies" – 3:52*
14. "A-OK" – 3:47
15. "1000 Paper Cranes" (Japanese bonus track) – 2:20

== Personnel ==
Personnel per 2003 edition booklet.

Motion City Soundtrack

- Joshua Cain – guitars, backing vocals
- Tony Thaxton – drums, percussion
- Justin Pierre – vocals, guitars, piano
- Jesse Johnson – Moog, bells
- Matthew Taylor – bass, backing vocals, piano

Additional musicians

- Austin Lindstrom – bass (original release)

Production

- Ed Rose – producer, engineer, mixing
- Dave Pinksy – mastering (original release)
- Doug Lefrak – management (original release)
- Jason Rio – management (original release)
- Josh Newman – management (original release)
- Jason Dickman – CD design (original release)
- Jesse Cain – photography (original release)
- Richard Grabel – legal (original release)
- Don C. Tyler – mastering
- Chris Strong – cover, back cover, band photography
- Bryan Sheffield – lyric photography
- Nick Pritchard – design
