= Sincere Engineer =

United States rock band

- Origin: Chicago, Illinois, U.S.
- Genres: Punk rock, pop punk
- Years active: 2017-present
- Labels: Hopeless; Red Scare
- Members: Deanna Belos; Adam Beck; Kyle Geib; Nick Arvanitis
- Website: sincereengineer.com

Sincere Engineer is an American punk rock band based in Chicago, Illinois. The band consists of Deanna Belos on lead vocals and guitar, Adam Beck on drums, Kyle Geib on guitar, and Nick Arvanitis on bass. The band has released four full-length albums. Their first album, Rhombithian, was released in 2017 via Red Scare Industries. In 2021, the group signed to Hopeless Records and released their second full-length album, titled Bless My Psyche. In 2023, the group released their third full-length album, titled Cheap Grills.. They released their fourth album, Probable Claws, on June 26th, 2026, featuring actor Wil Wheaton's spoken word on the song "LOL".

On May 1, 2025, Deanna Belos released a self-made documentary, titled Nobody's Gonna Do It for You: Ten Years of Sincere Engineer, to commemorate the band's tenth anniversary. The documentary was uploaded to YouTube and Veeps, and also had two special showings at the Top Note Theatre, located above the popular Chicago music venue Metro.

== Discography ==
Studio albums

- Rhombithian (2017, Red Scare Industries)
- Bless My Psyche (2021, Hopeless Records)
- Cheap Grills (2023, Hopeless Records)
- Probable Claws (2026, Hopeless Records)
