= Schatzi =

American rock band

- Origin: Austin, Texas, U.S.
- Genres: Alternative rock, power pop
- Years active: 1996–2004
- Labels: Humongous Fungus Records (1998–2000); Mammoth Records (2001–2002); Doghouse Records (2003); Quadraphonic Records (current)
- Members: Christian Kyle; Montez Williams; V. Marc Fort; Kyle Schneider; Davey McEathron
- Past members: Jason Westbrook(1996–98); Robt Ptak (1998); Jayson Altman (1996–00); Erick Sanger (1999–01); Nik Snell (2000–01); Tripp Wiggins (2000–01); Kyle Schneider (2000–02, 2013–present); Ed Davis (2003); Davey McEathron (2003–04, 2013–present)

Schatzi is an American band from Oklahoma, based in Austin, Texas, formed in 1996 by Montez Williams, Christian Kyle, Jason Westbrook and Jason Altman.

== Biography ==
Montez Williams, Christian Kyle, and Jason Westbrook met each other in Oklahoma, and played together in Brave New World. They moved on to start their own band, Blunderwheel that recorded one album, Roly Poly, and promptly moved to Austin, TX. The album was released in 1993 in Austin by Humongous Fungus Records. The band added drummer Jayson Altman and eventually changed the name to Schatzi in 1996. This lineup recorded their first album, Joanie Loves Schatzi, also released by Humongous Fungus, in 1998. Only 1000 copies of the album were made. In 1998 the former Size 14 Bassist Robt Ptak played some shows with the band; during this time lead singer Christian Kyle was helping Ptak with songs for Ptak's solo project Artificial Joy.

In 2000, with funding from the members of fellow Austin band Dynamite Hack, they recorded the Death of the Alphabet EP with drummer Kyle Schneider and bassist Erick Sanger, releasing it locally under Woppitzer Records. Their song "Death of the Alphabet", that included back-up vocals by Adrianne Verhoeven of The Anniversary, received heavy airplay on Austin's KROX-FM. This allowed them to get a spot in the KROX Christmas concert. The band and its EP became the subject of major-label bidding in 2001, and they were ultimately signed by Mammoth Records, who re-released their EP (produced by Ed Rose) nationally. V. Marc Fort and Mark Ford joined on bass and drums, respectively, between the release of the two versions.

Four songs from Death of the Alphabet made it onto their 2002 full-length album, Fifty Reasons to Explode. Released by Mammoth, Fifty Reasons to Explode reached #1 on the "Radio 200 Adds" chart of CMJ New Music Report in March 2002 and appeared on the magazine's "Radio 200" list for 11 weeks during that year, peaking at #20. CMJ New Music Monthly called the album "well produced pop punk that has just as much in common with NOFX and Lagwagon as it does with Jimmy Eat World and Braid." The Post and Courier's reviewer cited the record's "power pop gems and compared the band to Foo Fighters, Superdrag, The Ramones, and The Posies.

In 2003 they released a split EP with Motion City Soundtrack on Doghouse Records. That same year they recorded their third full-length, Snow Is for Saving Hearts, in Lincoln, NE with producer Mike Mogis and featured Orenda Fink of Azure Ray on a few tracks. The album was shelved by Hollywood Records after Mammoth Records was dissolved. After the departure of Williams, the band continued touring through 2004. Their final show was in 2005 with Motion City Soundtrack in Austin.

Throughout their career they played and toured with the likes of The Get Up Kids, Motion City Soundtrack, Shiner, Superchunk, The Promise Ring, Hey Mercedes, Jimmy Eat World, At The Drive-In, Ultimate Fakebook, The Anniversary, Ozma, Cadillac Blindside, Seville among others.

== Post-breakup ==
Schatzi played a reunion show in 2009 at Emo's in Austin, TX. Drummer Mark Ford continues to play in the band Magnet School (where he sings and plays guitar) and bass guitarist V. Marc Fort took on a full-time job at the Texas Music Office as a consultant, while continuing to play bass in the dream pop/rock band Paraguay. Christian is the owner of Orbit Salon (2000-present) and owner of White Light Realty.

In 2012, two reunion shows took place in Austin at The Parish on February 11 and Mohawk May 24.

Snow Is for Saving Hearts was released Valentine's Day 2012 on the band's own Quadraphonic Records.

== Members ==
=== Current ===
- Christian Kyle – lead vocals, guitar (1996–present)
- Montez Williams – vocals, guitar (1996–present)
- V. Marc Fort – bass guitar (1998–1999 and 2001–present)
- Kyle Schneider – drums (2013–present)
- Davey McEathron – keyboards, guitar (2013–present)

== Discography ==
- Joanie Loves Schatzi (1998)
- "Death of the Alphabet" EP (2001)
- Fifty Reasons to Explode (2002)
- Motion City Soundtrack/Schatzi split EP (2003)
- Snow Is for Saving Hearts (2012)
