= Motion City Soundtrack =

American rock band

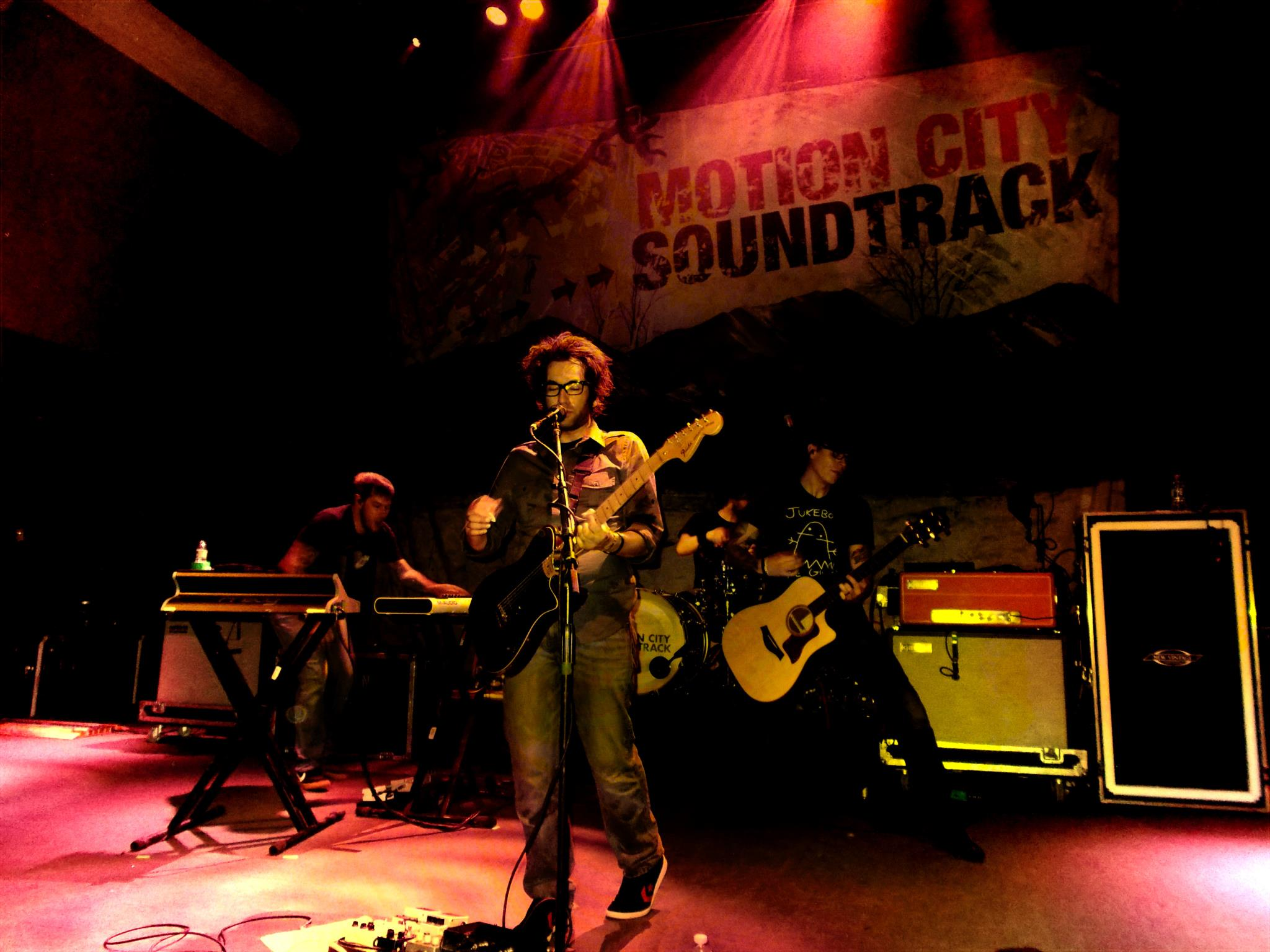
- Motion City Soundtrack performing in Washington, D.C. in 2012

Background information
- Origin: Minneapolis, Minnesota, U.S.
- Genres: Alternative rock; pop punk; pop rock; emo; power pop; indie rock
- Years active: 1997–2016; 2019–present
- Labels: Epitaph; Columbia; The Boombox Generation; Modern Radio
- Members: Justin Pierre; Joshua Cain; Jesse Johnson; Matthew Taylor; Tony Thaxton
- Past members: Joe Skinner; Andrew Whitney; Andrew Gruhn; Austin Lindstrom; Joel Habedank; Matt Potocnik; Sidney Burgdorf; Claudio Rivera
- Website: motioncitysoundtrack.com

Motion City Soundtrack is an American rock band formed in Minneapolis, Minnesota in 1997. The band's line-up consists of vocalist and guitarist Justin Pierre, lead guitarist Joshua Cain, keyboardist Jesse Johnson, bassist Matthew Taylor, and drummer Tony Thaxton. Over the course of their career, the group has toured heavily and released seven studio albums, the majority on independent label Epitaph Records. The band's sound, usually described as pop punk and/or emo, makes notable use of the Moog synthesizer. Pierre mainly handles the band's lyrics, which often touch on themes of anxiety, alienation, relationships, and self-destructive behavior.

The band was founded by Cain and Pierre, and took several years to form a stable lineup. I Am the Movie, the group's debut album, was released in 2003. Their commercial breakthrough, Commit This to Memory, arrived in 2005, and its follow-up Even If It Kills Me (2007) was similarly successful. For many years, the band was a staple of the Warped Tour. They briefly signed to major label Columbia for My Dinosaur Life (2010), but the label dropped the band shortly after and rejoined Epitaph for Go in 2012. Its follow-up, Panic Stations, arrived in 2015. The group disbanded the following year, but they announced a reunion in 2019, issuing their seventh album, The Same Old Wasted Wonderful World, in 2025.

The staff of Consequence ranked the band at number 75 on their list of "The 100 Best Pop Punk Bands" in 2019. In 2025, Terry Bezer of Screen Rant included the band in his list of "10 Forgotten Pop-Punk Bands Who Deserve To Be Better Remembered".

== History ==
=== Formation and early years (1997–2003) ===
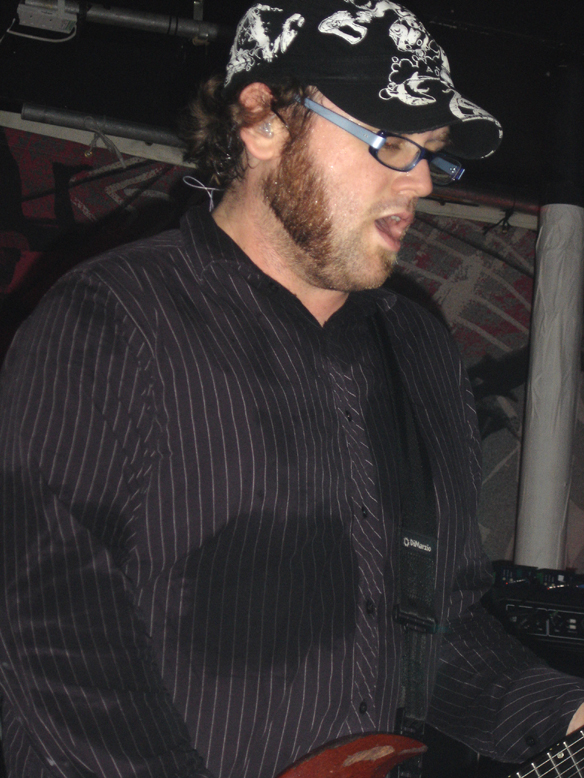
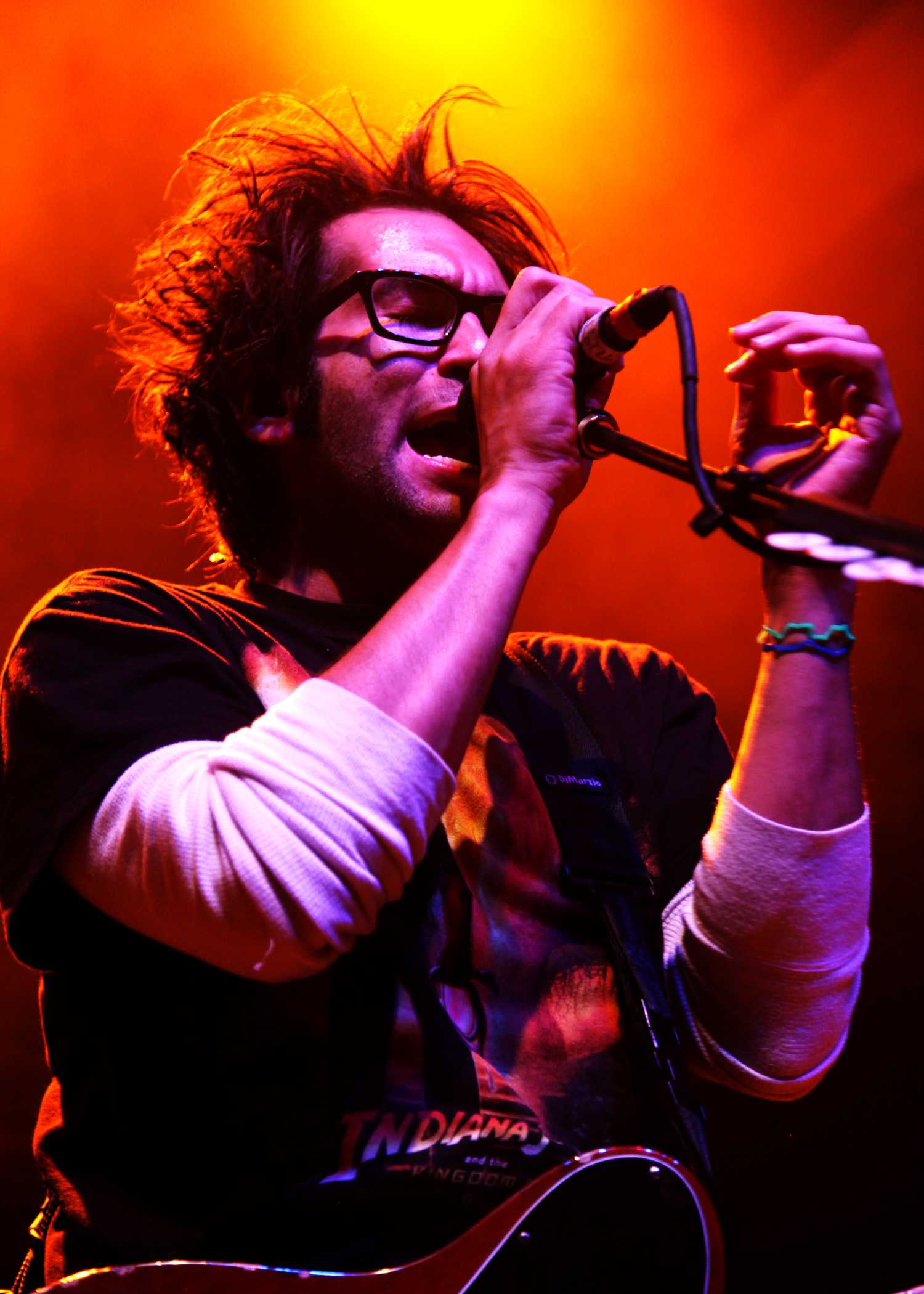
The band was founded by guitarist Joshua Cain (left) and vocalist Justin Pierre (right).

Motion City Soundtrack was formed in Minneapolis, Minnesota in 1997 by singer-songwriter Justin Courtney Pierre and guitarist Joshua Allen Cain. Previously, the duo had separately played in a number of bands. Cain was in a group named the Saddest Girl Story, and recruited Pierre to join as a singer. He was subsequently in a band called Boxcar, and following its dissolution, he and Pierre founded Motion City Soundtrack together. The band's name was inspired by a defunct film project that was originally created by Cain's brother, Brian. Their early days were difficult, as they found it hard to break out of their local scene. When they could get weeks off from their jobs, they would tour. According to Cain, the members of the band soon realized that there "wasn't really anywhere to play [shows] in Minneapolis", and that they would have to "tour all the time" to rise in popularity. In its early years, the group went through several lineup changes. Through these, Cain and Pierre would often have to take over keyboard duties during shows. The group's first release was a 7-inch single, "Promenade / Carolina", released in 1999. Their next two releases, both extended plays—Kids for America and Back to the Beat—were released the following year.

Over the course of the early 2000s, the band continued to tour and shuffle through members. In late 2001, while touring in Milton, Pennsylvania with the band Submerge, they convinced two of its members—bassist Matthew Scott Taylor and drummer Tony Richard Thaxton—to join the band. Thaxton initially took about a year to convince to join the band. Jesse Mack Johnson, a friend and co-worker of Cain's, joined the band as keyboardist just three weeks before the band recorded their first album. Johnson had never played the keyboard before but Cain taught him the parts that had already been written. After their first attempt at self-recording an album failed, the band culled together $6,000 to record with producer Ed Rose, best known for his work with the Get Up Kids. They recorded much of their debut album, I Am the Movie, in ten days. Initial copies were hand-packaged inside floppy disks, which were sold out of the back of their tour van for a year.

The band began receiving offers from various record labels, including Universal, Triple Crown Records, and Drive-Thru Records, and they performed at industry showcases. Meanwhile, Brett Gurewitz, founder of Epitaph Records, learned of the band from members of the group Matchbook Romance. He attended four of their shows in Los Angeles that Pierre later regarded as among his worst, as his voice was poor from constant touring. While they were interested in Universal, they chose to sign to Epitaph as they felt the contract was less restrictive and more honest. Eli Janney from Girls Against Boys helped the band secure management and a lawyer. Motion City became part of a slew of Epitaph signings, including Matchbook Romance, Scatter the Ashes and From First to Last, amid concerns the Southern California label had strayed too far from its roots, and seemed "a little too emo."

=== Breakthrough and success (2003–2006) ===
After signing with Epitaph, they recorded three new songs with the bands Reggie and the Full Effect and Ultimate Fakebook for a triple split EP which was never released. The new songs were added to the second release of I Am the Movie, which was released via Epitaph on June 24, 2003. Epitaph afforded the quartet wider distribution and a proper budget, which allowed them to re-record several songs on the album to match their original vision. During this time, the band visited the United Kingdom for the first time in 2003 while on tour with Sugarcult, followed by an inaugural stint on Warped Tour 2003. The band continued to tour heavily into the next year, with US dates alongside Rufio, Mae, and Fall Out Boy, plus Simple Plan and MxPx. A European leg—titled the "Totally Wicked Awesome Tour"—featured the group with Sugarcult, the All-American Rejects, and Limbeck. That year, the band also filmed music videos for the singles "The Future Freaks Me Out" and "My Favorite Accident". Their fame grew concurrently with a second appearance on the Warped Tour 2004, where they were considered by fans to be a "must-see" act.

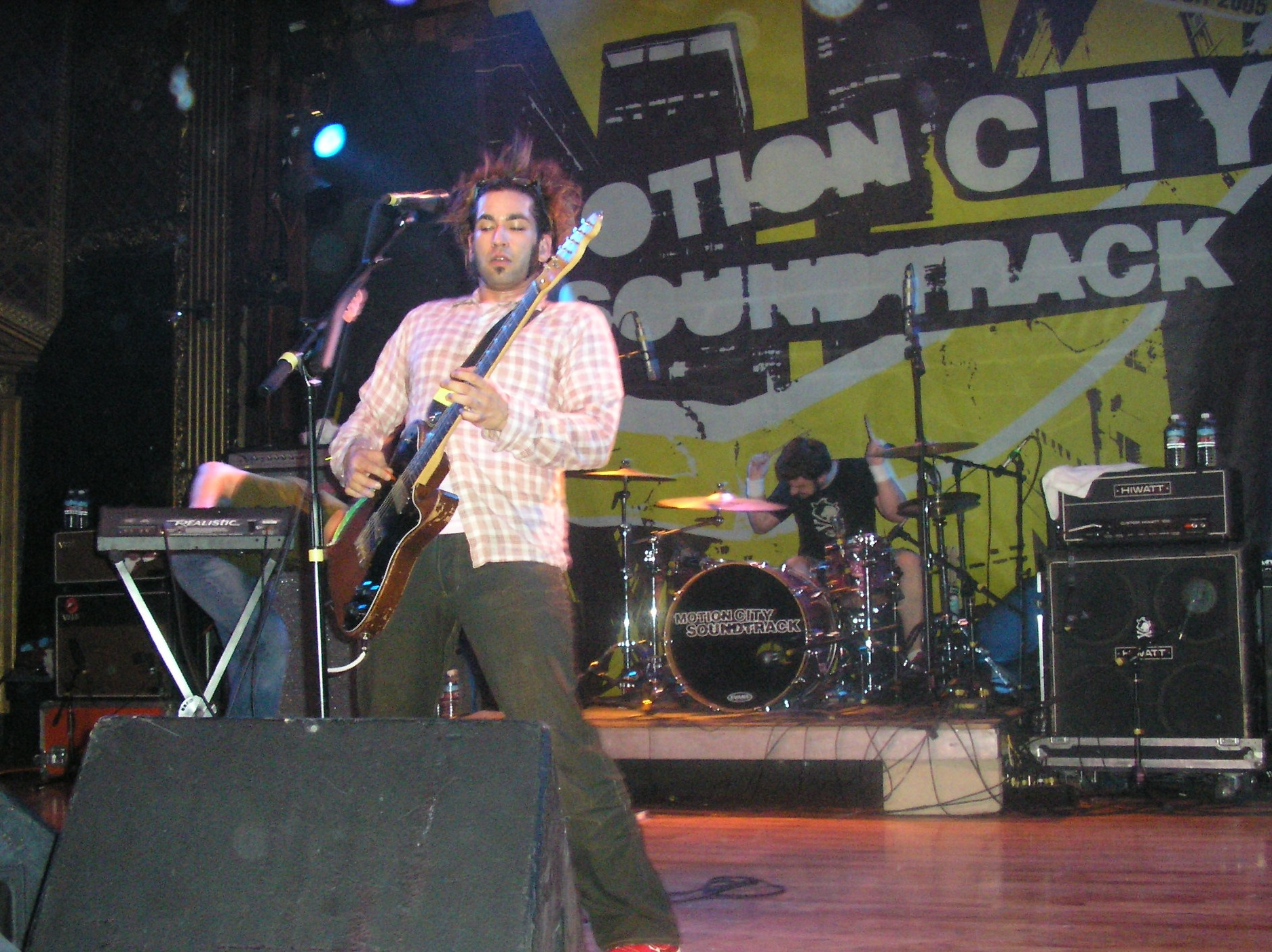
The band performing in Denver, Colorado in 2005.

The band joined Blink-182 for touring stints in Europe and Japan later in the year, at the recommendation of the band's bassist, Mark Hoppus. Cain invited Hoppus to produce Motion City's sophomore album, and he accepted. The album, Commit This to Memory, was recorded at Seedy Underbelly Studios, a suburban home converted into a studio in Los Angeles' Valley Village region. It was written partially in their hometown of Minneapolis and in Los Angeles, during a period in which Pierre was seeking treatment for alcohol abuse. Commit This to Memory was the first album by the band to feature material crafted by each musician in the group, as previous releases had featured songs written in the years prior to each member joining. In addition, the band also had more time and funds to create the album. During its recording process, Motion City embarked on their first headlining tour, titled "The Sub-Par Punk Who Cares Tour 2004". At the year's end, the band had played over 270 concerts.

"Attractive Today"
This sample of the first song on Commit This to Memory illustrates Pierre's lyrics – often centering on relationships and time – as well as Johnson's Moog synthesizer.

Commit This to Memory, which was leaked to file sharing websites months before its official debut, saw release on June 7, 2005, peaking at number two on Billboard's Independent Albums chart. Pierre estimated that by 2015 the album had sold nearly 500,000 copies. The band's music videos found regular rotation on networks such as MTV2, and the band also performed on Late Night with Conan O'Brien. However, their mainstream breakthrough brought detractors, and they became a target for critics of pop punk: "[the band was] frequently characterized as the sort of ultra-commercial punk poseurs who water down the genre to the point of drowning it," wrote Michael Roberts of Westword. The group continued to tour constantly, and started attracting larger crowds. They began the year with the inaugural Epitaph Tour, alongside Matchbook Romance and From First to Last. It was followed by dates on the Warped Tour 2005, and the Nintendo Fusion Tour with Fall Out Boy, Panic! at the Disco, and the Starting Line, which was their largest nationwide tour to that point.

=== Continued success (2007–2011) ===
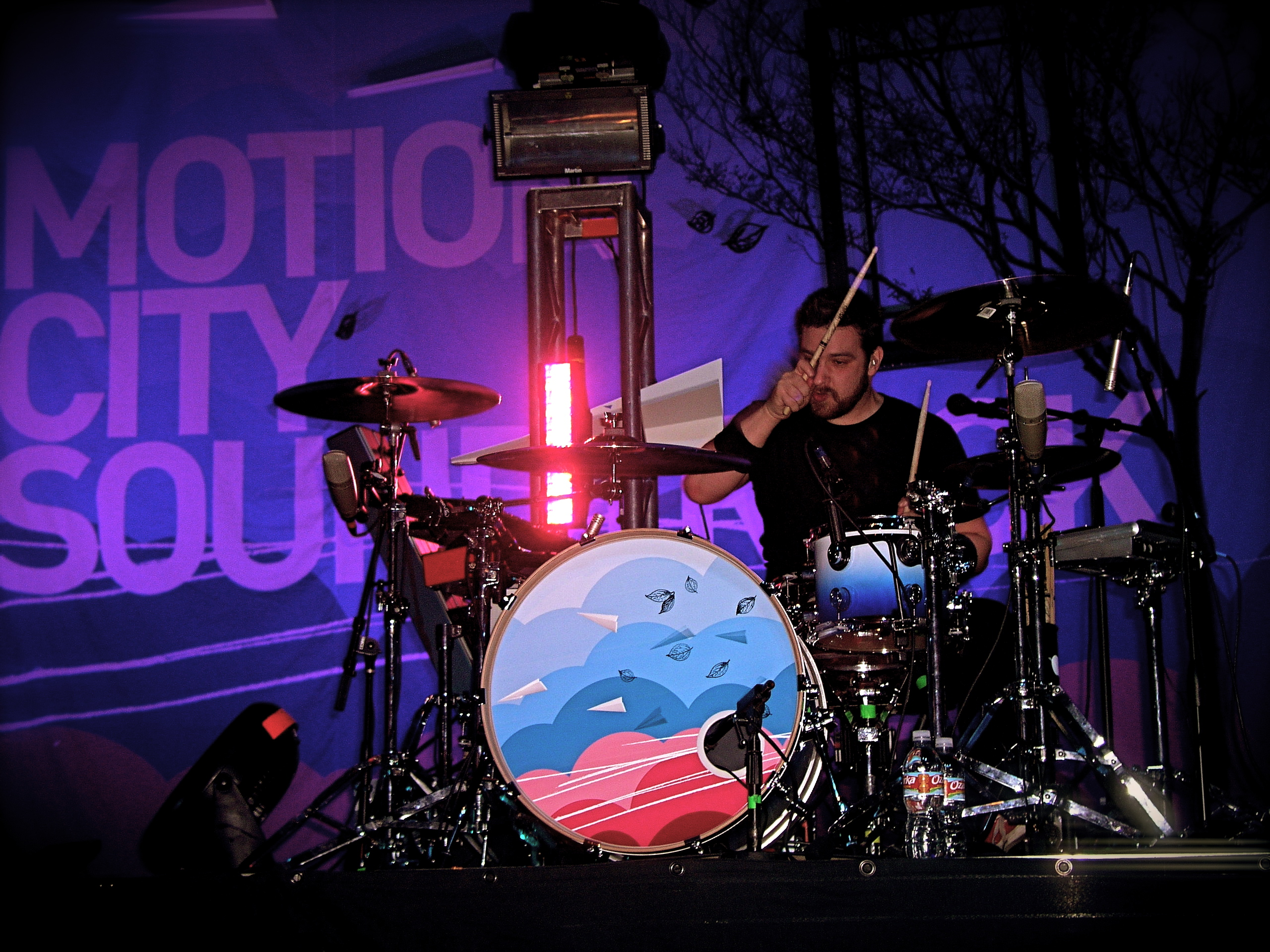
Drummer Tony Thaxton performing with the band in 2007.

The band's follow-up, Even If It Kills Me (2007), was recorded in New York City with Eli Janney, Adam Schlesinger of Fountains of Wayne, and Ric Ocasek of the Cars. The group, though big fans of his work, were disappointed with Ocasek's role. "He just confused me the whole time," said Pierre later, who noted that he was afraid to disclose that the experience was a "bum-out." Pierre struggled with writer's block during the sessions and found himself writing lyrics while recording the songs, which he had never done before. The band was also worried their songs would not be catchy enough after their last album was so successful. During this time, Pierre's substance issues nearly disbanded the group. "I think it's an understatement to say it is tough to be tied to Justin's emotions," Cain remarked at the time. Following completion of the album, Pierre entered a rehabilitation program for alcohol and drug abuse. The band was apart for a six-week stretch in mid-2007, marking their longest break apart in five years. "It might sound clichéd, but we all had a chance to do some growing up," said Cain.

Even If It Kills Me was released on September 18, 2007, and represented a large leap from the group's last chart performance: it peaked at number 16 on the Billboard 200 and number one on the magazine's Independent Albums chart. "This Is for Real" became their best-charting single, peaking at number 48 in Australia. Cain later felt that the band placed far too much emphasis at the time on "numbers and trajectory instead of the creative process." The following year saw a rise in profile for the band: they worked out promotional deals with Coca-Cola and Pepsi, their music was licensed in various television shows, movies, and video games, and they toured heavily. The band released an acoustic EP featuring songs from Even if It Kills Me in May 2008. After the release of that EP, the band toured on the Honda Civic Tour with Panic at the Disco and Phantom Planet, and then joined the last weeks of the Warped Tour 2008. In September, they headlined on The Left Handed Forms of Human Endeavor Tour.

Motion City signed a multiple-album deal with Columbia Records several months before releasing their previous album. Following the move, the guitarist Joshua Cain said, "It just felt right to make the move when there was the right interest there." With the new signing, the band's promotional team aimed to develop a balance between the benefits of a new major label and their previous grass-roots approach. Their next album saw the band reunite with producer Mark Hoppus, and the album was mostly recorded at his studio in North Hollywood, Opra Music, between April and June 2009. Hoppus said that the band wanted to follow in the tracks of Commit This to Memory, but to push things further. Pierre later recalled that the atmosphere in the studio was more loose than their first time working with Hoppus. The band picked the title My Dinosaur Life after a quote Pierre kept repeating—they felt it a nice representation of the album's themes, which include growing old and feeling out of place. After completing the album, the band toured with Blink-182 on their reunion tour, and Pierre undertook a promotional tour called On the Dino Trail wherein he performed acoustic sets.

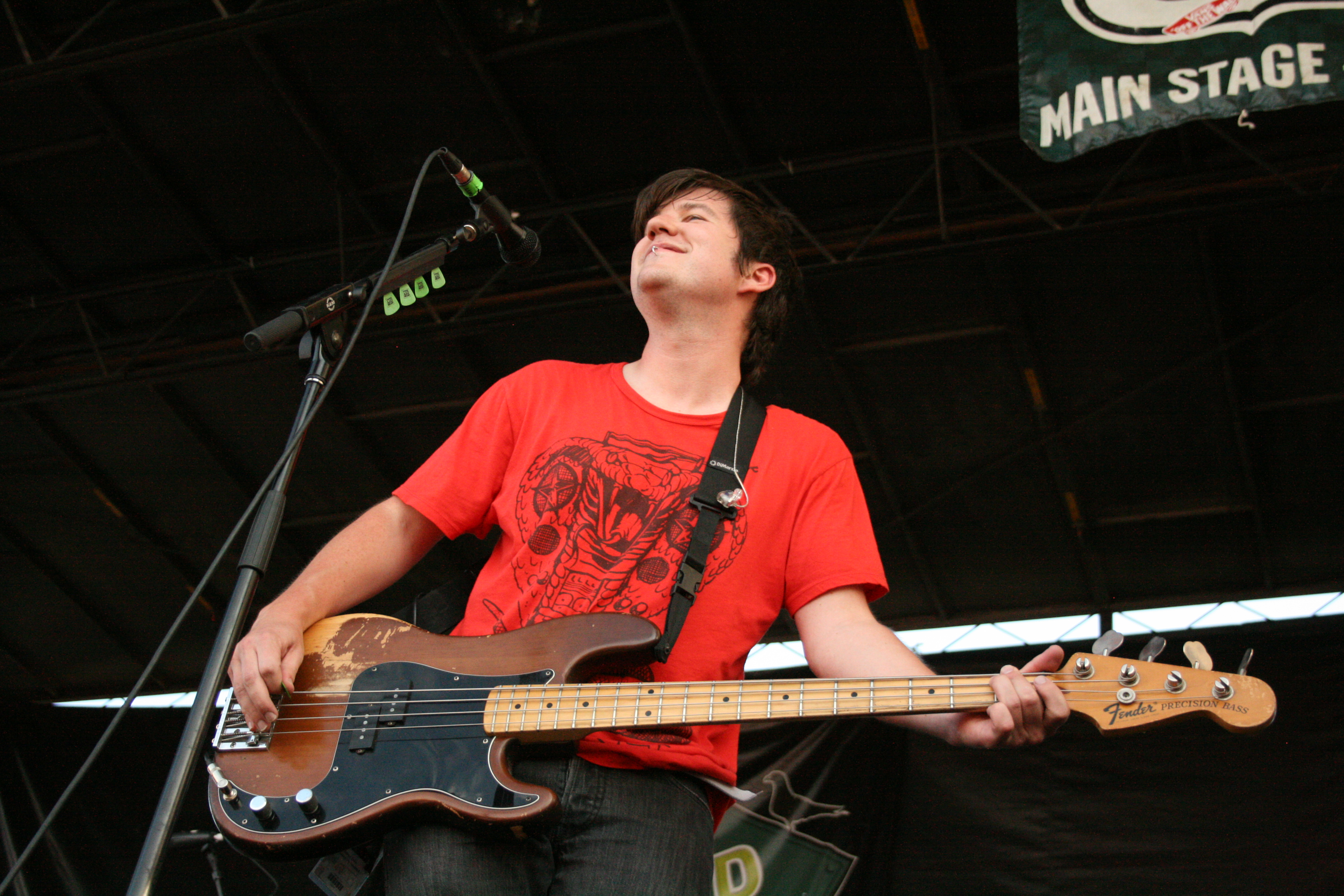
Bassist Matthew Taylor on the Warped Tour in 2008.

My Dinosaur Life was released to acclaim from music critics upon its debut on January 19, 2010, and it represented the band's all-time best chart performance, peaking at number 15 on the Billboard 200. They supported Weezer on several dates during this time, and they began a headlining tour in late January in the US. In the first three months following the album's release, the band continued to tour heavily: they traveled to Australia for the national Soundwave festival, as well as to Japan and the UK. The band also began to receive radio airplay for the first time in their career, and they released a music video for the single "Her Words Destroyed My Planet". The group embarked on a large tour with Say Anything between October and November 2010, and premiered a self-shot video for "A Lifeless Ordinary" during that time. Columbia dropped the band later that year, with the commercial performance of My Dinosaur Life leading to the split. "I guess we didn't do as well as they hoped or expected us to," said Pierre that year. "And we felt that having all their resources at our disposal would perhaps propel us into another dimension. But we are what we are regardless of what label or machine is behind us. We did exceptionally well, though, if you want to look strictly at sales numbers in today's climate."

=== Final years and split (2012–2016) ===
After being dropped by Columbia, the band set off to Brazil to support All Time Low in January 2011. They subsequently began recording their fifth studio album with producer and longtime friend Ed Ackerson at his studio, Flowers Studio, in Minneapolis. The band recorded on their own time with their own resources, which both provided comfort and a sense of nervousness to the group. They relaxed and took their time writing it, and did not preconceive the album as a change in style. "We just felt like it was like we were just taking our time and just kinda living life and not worrying about too much other than getting together and making music," remarked Taylor. Pierre has since looked back on Go with mixed emotions, citing it as his personal least favorite album by the band. He noted that he was struggling with dark thoughts and felt that the band's collective misery translated to the record.

Following the recording of Go, the band set out on the "4 Albums. 2 Nights. 7 Cities" tour, which found the band performing their past discography over two nights. They also covered "Wait So Long" by Trampled by Turtles for a split 7-inch, which was released in November 2011. During that time period, they searched for a label to release Go, ultimately returning to Epitaph. Go was released on June 12, 2012, and received mixed reviews from contemporary music critics. Its chart performance represented a large drop-off from its predecessors, peaking at number 46 on the Billboard 200 and number eight on the Independent Albums chart. "True Romance" was the album's lead single, and featured a one-shot music video reminiscent of the works of Spike Jonze. The group spent much of the remaining year on the road, including dates in Asia in mid-2012 and a headlining US tour in October and November.

Drummer Tony Thaxton departed the group in March 2013 following battles with depression, due in part to their ceaseless touring schedule. The band enlisted longtime friend Claudio Rivera of Saves the Day as their new drummer, and released a one-off single with him, "Inside Out", in celebration. The band immediately began writing a new album, but progress was slow. The group shelved a group of demos they recorded with Mike Sapone, who also worked with Brand New. In the meantime, a video documentary, I Am the Movie: The Movie, was released in 2013. It mainly consists of footage shot of the band around the time of the album's creation. The group participated in Warped Tour 2013 and went on a co-headlining tour with Relient K that November.

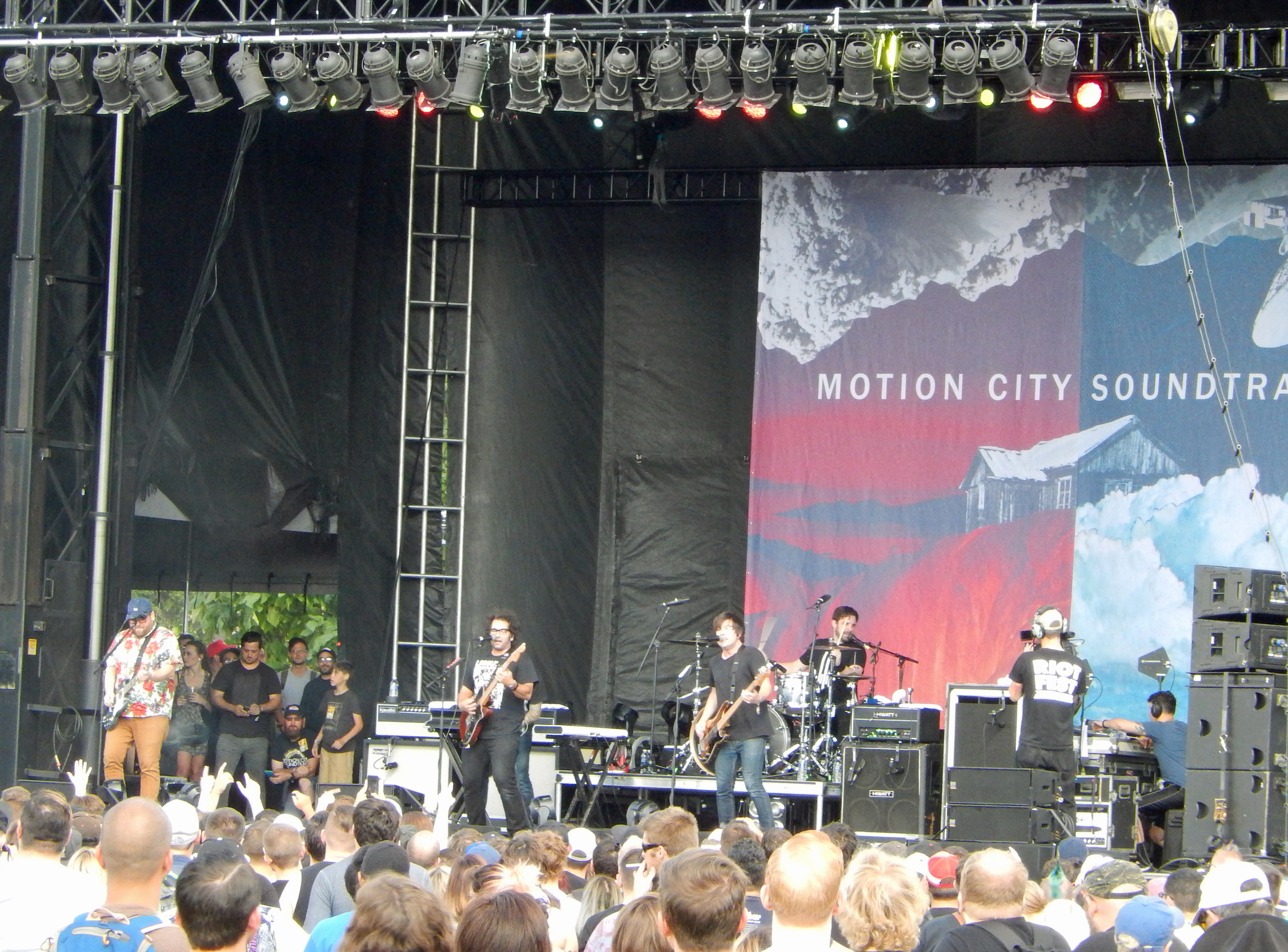
Motion City playing their penultimate show at Riot Fest in 2016.

The group recorded their sixth album, Panic Stations, over two weeks at Pachyderm Studio in Cannon Falls, Minnesota in June 2014. The group collaborated with producer John Agnello, well known for his work with Dinosaur Jr., Walt Mink, and Sonic Youth. The album was largely recorded live. The album's release was delayed by over a year, however, due to the birth of Pierre's daughter. In the interim, the group embarked on a tour celebrating the tenth anniversary of Commit This to Memory between January and February 2015, playing the album in its entirety. The band later extended this anniversary tour, and further toured the album between June and August 2015. Panic Stations was released on September 18, 2015, to positive reviews from music critics, but it debuted even lower on music charts than its predecessor. A tour with the Wonder Years followed between October and November 2015, and saw the release of a split 7-inch between the two bands.

As the band entered 2016, Cain felt the future for the group was bright: "We're not done yet. I think we got more music in us," he told Substream Magazine in January 2016. Two months later, however, the band announced their break-up with a statement that read, in part: "We have no idea what the future holds, but for now we are done." In interviews later that year, Pierre detailed the band's reasoning, noting that their exhaustion with touring and growing families contributed to their decision: "We've done this one thing constantly for so many years nonstop. We all wanted to have something else to look ahead to in our lives." The band embarked on the So Long, Farewell Tour across North America between May and September 2016, with original drummer Tony Thaxton returning. It concluded with a sold-out show at the Metro in Chicago on September 18, 2016.

=== Reunion (2019–2024) ===
During their three-year break, all of the members moved to different states and pursued different interests. Pierre continued to record music and tour as a solo act, issuing his debut solo album In the Drink in 2018, which Cain assisted him in producing. The following June, the band announced their reformation with a U.S. tour. In an interview, Pierre explained their inactivity had given rise to an "excitement" to focus on the band again. The tour, named "Don't Call It a Comeback" for a song on their debut album, took place in January 2020. Thaxton returned to the band in an official capacity for the tour. The band were scheduled to travel to the U.K. for the Slam Dunk Festival that May, but plans were shelved due to the COVID-19 pandemic. The five-piece continued to tour in 2022, celebrating the seventeenth anniversary of Commit This to Memory.

In 2020, the group released three new songs. The first, a cover of Fountains of Wayne's "A Dip in the Ocean", was featured on Saving for a Custom Van – a tribute compilation celebrating the life of Fountains of Wayne bassist and songwriter Adam Schlesinger. who had passed away earlier that year. Midway through the year, the quartet issued a previously unreleased track, "Crooked Ways"; it was recorded a decade prior and submitted for consideration for inclusion in the Twilight film saga. Author Stephenie Meyer, in a blog post, suggested it was inspiration for her novel Midnight Sun. Lastly, the group recorded a cover of Ed Ackerson's "Wired Weird" for a tribute album to Ackerson, who produced their 2012 album Go and had died in 2019. Cain claimed there was "no official plan" for further music at that point, although he believed the band was "not entirely finished" making new music. In an Instagram livestream, Pierre hinted at the future possibility of the band releasing new music while answering a viewer's question. Pierre responded, "I would like that. I'm not sure if anyone else would, but I would."

In 2023, the band supported the All-American Rejects on the Wet Hot All-American Summer Tour, staging appearances at Adjacent Fest and When We Were Young. In 2024, the band embarked on an anniversary tour celebrating I Am the Movie. Zach Comtois was introduced on this tour as the band's new touring rhythm guitarist; Pierre had found himself unable to play guitar live due to a back injury, leaving him to focus solely on lead vocals when performing. The group released the single "Stop Talking" in August 2024 to coincide with the theatrical release of the 2024 film Dìdi, which the song features in. The single was the first original new material released by the band since Panic Stations in 2015.

=== The Same Old Wasted Wonderful World (2025–present) ===
On June 15, 2025. the band played the 30th anniversary revival of Vans Warped Tour in Washington, D.C.. Two days later, the group announced their seventh studio album, The Same Old Wasted Wonderful World, on June 17, 2025, releasing its lead single "She Is Afraid" alongside a music video inspired by Severance. The album marked their first in ten years, marking their longest gap between records, as well as the first album to feature the band's classic line-up since 2012's Go. Reflecting on the new album’s creation, guitarist Joshua Cain said it was about reconnecting with "what originally made the band special". Frontman Justin Pierre added that, unlike past records focused on personal struggles and confusion, he had since "found clarity and a stronger sense of identity through working through those challenges". The album was recorded by Sean O'Keefe, a veteran producer who has previously worked with bands like Fall Out Boy, Hawthorne Heights the Plain White T's, and Beach Bunny. The band had previously worked with O'Keefe back in the 2000s, for split EPs with the bands Matchbook Romance and Schatzi.

The band was confirmed to be performing at the 2026 Sonic Temple music festival in Columbus, Ohio.

== Musical style and influences ==
=== Music ===
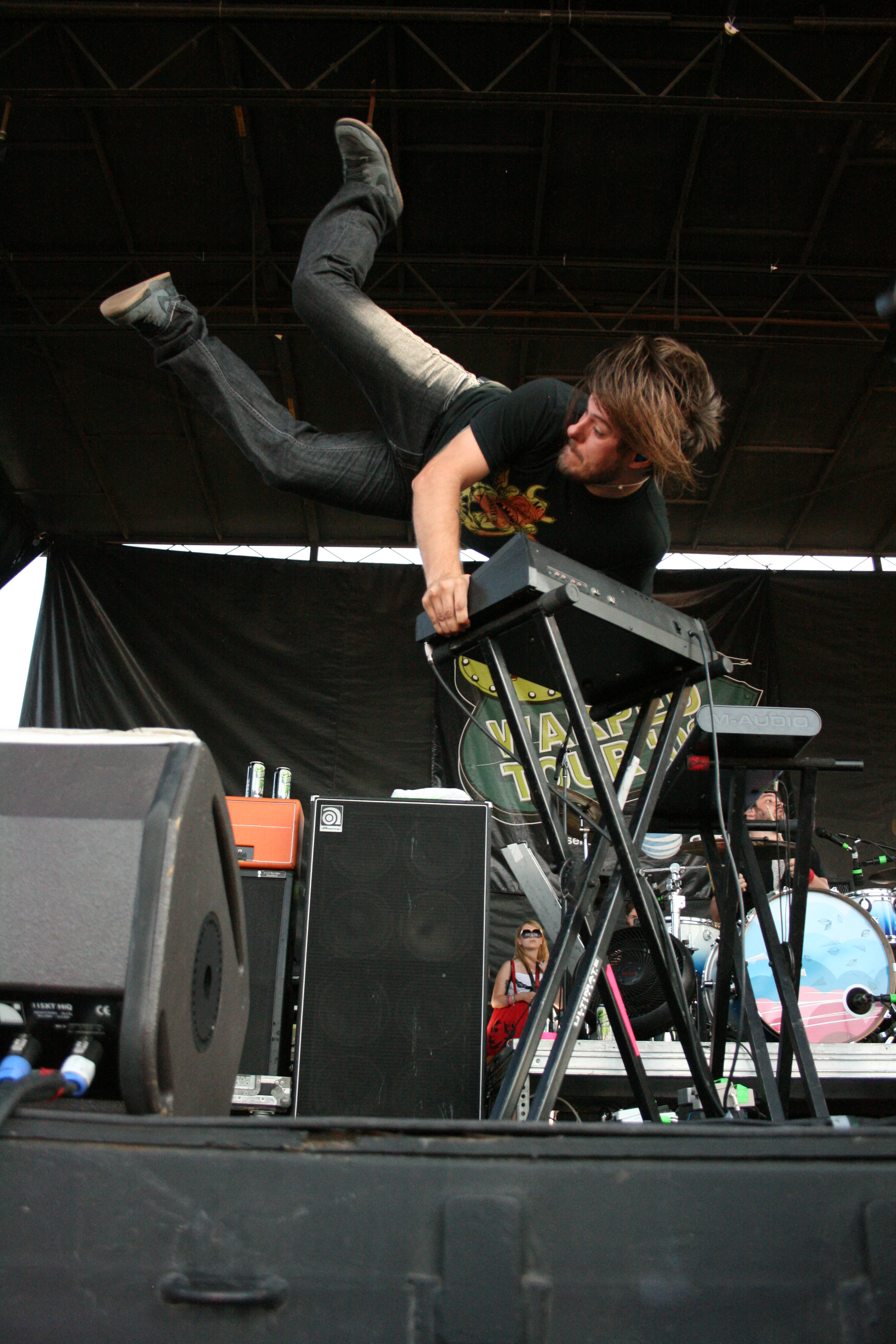
Keyboardist Jesse Johnson's signature "moogstand" in 2008.

The three main influences that unite all members of Motion City Soundtrack are Superchunk, Jawbox, and Pixies. Both Justin Pierre and Matt Taylor are also influenced by Ben Folds Five, Fugazi, and Braid. Pierre also takes inspiration from Poster Children, the Carpenters, the Cardigans, Pavement, Tom Waits, the Flaming Lips, and Sunny Day Real Estate, while Taylor cites That Dog, Swervedriver, Radiohead, the Rentals, and Burning Airlines as additional influences.

Pierre quoted Waits that "all anybody ever does is imitate their favorite artist—badly," adding, "we're just regurgitating all the crap we listened to in the late '80s and early '90s, the music that got us into playing music in the first place."

The band's musical style is widely recognizable by its unique blend of pop-punk with the Moog synthesizer. The usage of the Moog stems from Cain, who first heard the instrument employed on the Rentals' album Return of the Rentals (1995). He subsequently bought a cheap Moog at a pawn shop and wanted it to be an integral part of Motion City upon their formation. Terry Bezer of Screen Rant said: "Motion City Soundtrack were probably too quirky for mass acceptance. [...] Their music is a kaleidoscope of wonder where playful keyboards dance around guitars that constantly shift and drums that rarely stay at one tempo." Johnson became known for his signature "Moogstand" in live performances, which consisted of a handstand on the instrument. The group has been widely attributed to a number of different genres, including pop rock, power pop, indie rock, emo, and pop-punk. Joshua Cain dismissed this latter label, remarking, "I definitely wouldn't consider us a pop-punk band. Our influences are more based on '90s bands like Superchunk and early Weezer." Pierre characterized the band's music as "dirty, fast, happy, emotional rock songs."

Nylon compared the music of their debut album, I Am the Movie, to All and the Get Up Kids. It has been described as having a "distinctly unified and identifiable style." Subsequent releases varied in style. My Dinosaur Life, for example, saw the band attempting to emulate their favorite post-hardcore acts, such as Archers of Loaf and Dinosaur Jr.

=== Lyrics ===
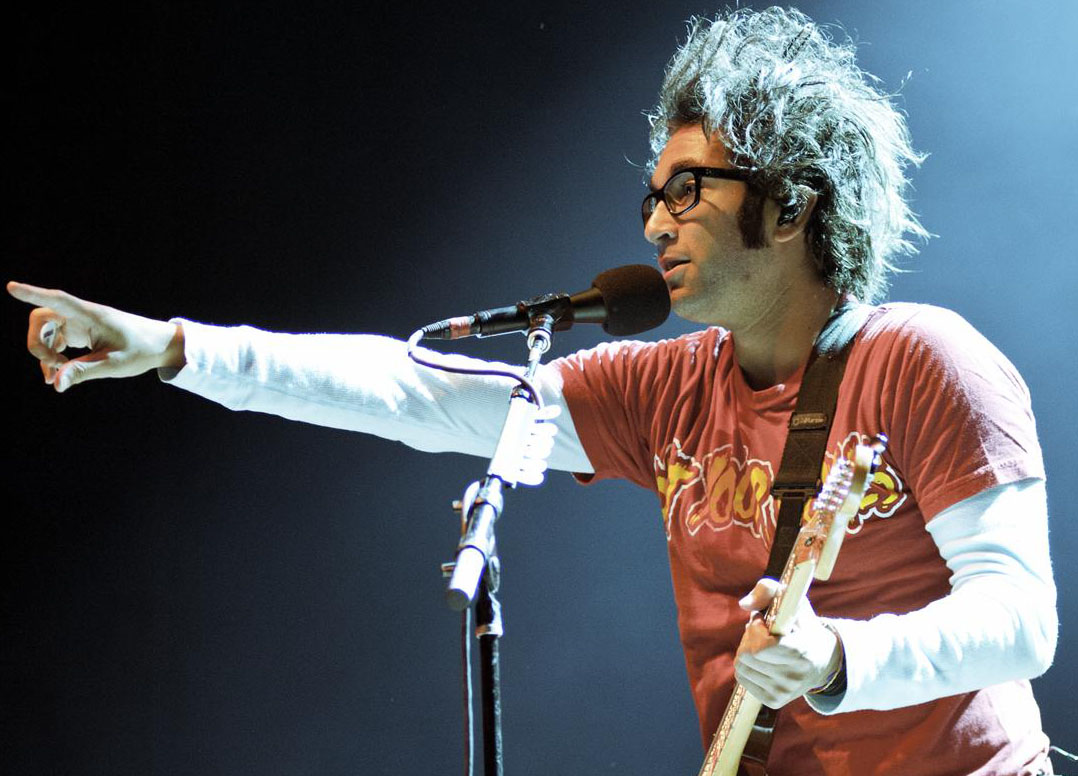
Justin Pierre, frontman and primary lyricist for the band, in 2010.

Most of Motion City Soundtrack's lyrical content was written by lead vocalist, Justin Pierre. This material was largely affected by his personal life and past experiences. Songs came about in myriad ways. Many times, the band would write music first that Pierre would set words to, other times Pierre would write a song on guitar with words and bring it to the band. Pierre could often "spend hours and days and weeks and months on lyrics—sometimes they come quick, sometimes they don't come at all," he said. He noted that he had a screenwriting teacher in film school that taught him to "write what you know," but in his case, he could only write about "being a self-obsessed pessimistic sort of loser." This led him to characterize his writing as a sort of therapy for him and a vehicle to better understand the human condition.

Commit This to Memory "addresses the themes of substance abuse, psychological disorders and failing relationships." For the record, he intended to simplify his lyrics to enhance storytelling and he drew inspiration from Tom Waits, Ben Folds, and John K. Samson's writing styles. In some cases, he chose to write from another individual's point of view, rather than his own. Their next album, Even If It Kills Me, was Pierre's first "written completely sober, after battling drugs and alcohol for years;" consequently, the record is more optimistic and less self-loathing. My Dinosaur Life has lyrics relating to relationships, procrastination, and Pierre's own desire for a life away from his self-destructive behavior. Much of the lyricism on fifth album Go is consumed with death and "the eventual demise of everything."

== Honors and awards ==
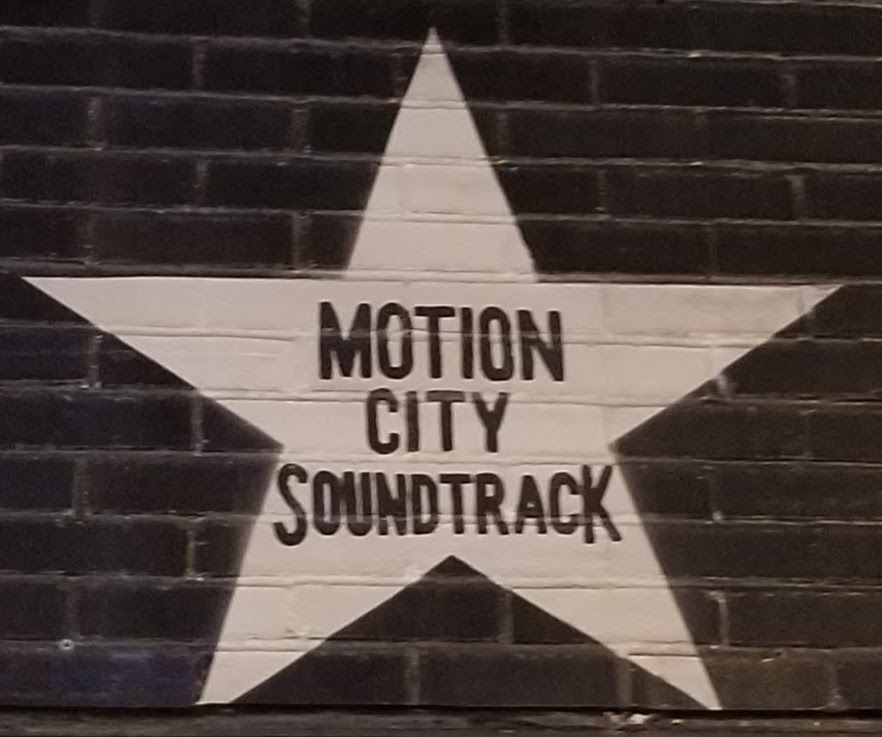
Motion City Soundtrack's star on the outside mural of the Minneapolis nightclub First Avenue

Motion City Soundtrack were nominated for three MTVU Woodie Awards while the awards were active between 2004 and 2017, winning two of them. In 2005, the band won the Breaking Woodie for Best Emerging Artist – beating Matisyahu, Paul Wall, The Bravery and The Decemberists. They were nominated again in 2007 in the Best Video category for their "Broken Heart" video, but were beaten by Say Anything's "Wow, I Can Get Sexual Too". They were nominated again the following year in the same category, winning the award for their music video for "It Had To Be You" over clips by fellow nominees Adele ("Chasing Pavements"), Erykah Badu ("Honey"), Gnarls Barkley ("Who's Gonna Save My Soul"), and Vampire Weekend ("Mansard Roof").

The band were honored with a star on the outside mural of the Minneapolis nightclub First Avenue in 2010, shortly after the release of My Dinosaur Life. The venue's mural stare recognizes performers that have played sold-out shows, or have otherwise demonstrated a major contribution to the culture, at the venue. Receiving a star "might be the most prestigious public honor an artist can receive in Minneapolis," according to journalist Steve Marsh.

On October 31, 2017, the band's 2005 single "Everything Is Alright" received an official gold status by the Recording Industry Association of America. The album that it stems from, Commit This to Memory, has also been certified gold in the US, having sold over a quarter-million copies.

== Band members ==
Current members

- Justin Pierre – lead vocals, rhythm guitar (1997–2016, 2019–present), keyboards (1998–2001), lead guitar (2002)
- Joshua Cain – lead guitar (1998–2002, 2002–2016, 2019–present), backing vocals (1998–2016, 2019–present), bass (1997–1998, 2002), keyboards (1998–2001)
- Jesse Johnson – synthesizer, keyboards, piano (2001–2016, 2019–present)
- Matthew Taylor – bass, backing vocals, keyboards (2002–2016, 2019–present)
- Tony Thaxton – drums, percussion, backing vocals (2002–2013, 2016, 2019–present)

Current touring musicians

- Zach Comtois – rhythm guitar (2023–present) (Note: Comtois plays Pierre's parts live, who is currently unable to sing and play guitar simultaneously due to recovering from back surgery.)

Former members

- Joe Skinner – lead guitar (1997–1997)
- Andrew Whitney – drums (1997–1998)
- Andrew Gruhn – keyboards (1998)
- Austin Lindstrom – bass (1998–2000, 2001–2002)
- Joel Habedank – drums (1998–2000)
- Matt Potocnik – bass (2000–2001)
- Sidney Burgdorf – drums (2001)
- Claudio Rivera – drums (2013–2016)

Former touring musicians

- Kate Steinberg – synthesizer, keyboards, piano (2024; live substitute for Jesse Johnson)
- Jacob Carlson — lead guitar (2025; live substitute for Joshua Cain)
- Patrick Stump – lead vocals (2025; live substitute for Justin Pierre)

== Discography ==
Studio albums

- I Am the Movie (2003)
- Commit This to Memory (2005)
- Even If It Kills Me (2007)
- My Dinosaur Life (2010)
- Go (2012)
- Panic Stations (2015)
- The Same Old Wasted Wonderful World (2025)
