= Joshua Cain =

American musician (born 1976)

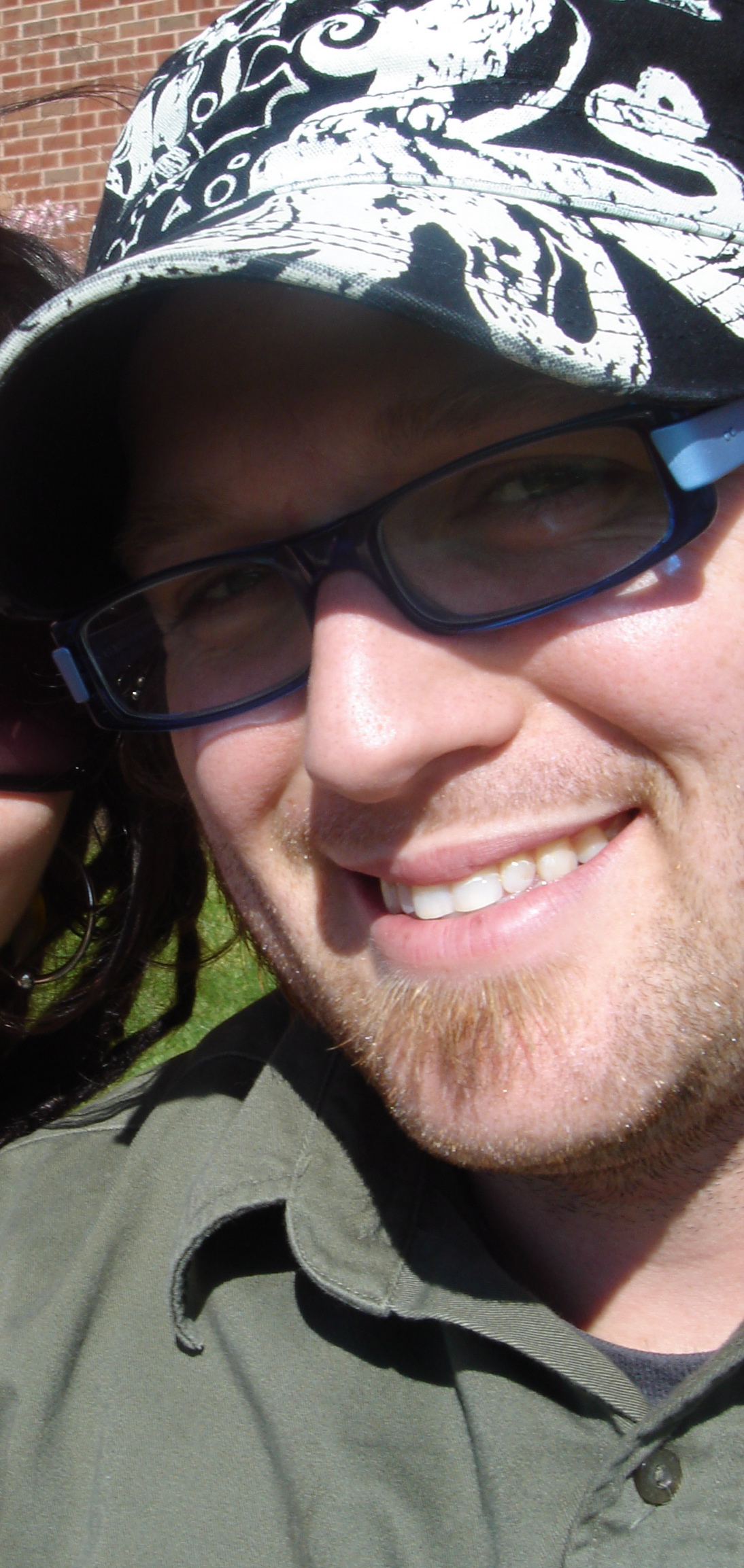

Background information
- Born: Joshua Allen Cain; July 31, 1976 (age 50)
- Origin: St. Paul, Minnesota
- Genres: Pop punk, indie rock
- Occupations: Musician; record producer
- Instruments: Guitar; vocals
- Years active: 1997–present
- Label: Columbia Records
- Member of: Motion City Soundtrack

Joshua Allen Cain (born July 31, 1976) is a guitarist and record producer from Saint Paul, Minnesota. He is the co-founder and lead guitarist of American pop punk band Motion City Soundtrack. Cain is also a music producer with multiple past projects; comprising an EP for Epitaph-signed band Sing It Loud and two songs (including the lead single) from Metro Station's debut album.

== History ==
Joshua Cain played in numerous bands before joining the much more successful Motion City Soundtrack. Prior to Motion City he had roles in bands Superette, Saddest Girl Story, and Boxcar. He then co-founded Motion City Soundtrack with guitarist and lead vocalist Justin Pierre in 1997. Cain took on a lot of managerial responsibilities when the band first began, including booking the band's first shows. He is lead guitar in the band, playing a 1965 Gibson SG Junior through a Vox AC-30 Custom Classic. Cain also sings many of the band's backup vocals, including a notable solo in the song "Capital H" from the band's debut studio album, I Am the Movie. Cain and longtime girlfriend Jill Lipski married on September 8, 2007, during a ceremony at the Gale Mansion in his hometown of Minneapolis. In 2010, the couple welcomed their first child, Dot Cain.

=== Production ===
Cain took up his first production job outside of any Motion City Soundtrack project in 2006. Alongside fellow band member Justin Pierre, he produced two tracks for the pop rock band Metro Station. "Kelsey" and "Seventeen Forever" both featured on the band's self-titled debut album, Metro Station, after "Seventeen Forever" had gained the band exposure on Myspace. "Kelsey" was the first single to be released from the album, ahead of the chart hit "Shake It", which peaked at #3 on Hot Digital Songs, #9 in the Pop 100 and #10 in the Billboard Hot 100. In 2008, the album went on to peak at #43 in the Billboard 200, #1 Top Electronic Albums and #2 in the Top Heatseekers.

In 2007, Cain was appointed to produce the second EP for Motion City Soundtrack's fellow hometown band from Minneapolis, Sing it Loud. He produced all five songs for the band's 2008 release, coinciding with their signing to Epitaph Records.
