= Flowers Studio =

Minneapolis recording studio founded by Ed Ackerson

Flowers Studio logo

Flowers Studio is a recording studio in Minneapolis founded by Ed Ackerson, leader of the alternative rock bands Polara and the 27 Various, and co-founder of the Susstones Records label. Many notable musicians have recorded at the studio, including the Jayhawks, The Replacements, Motion City Soundtrack, Brian Setzer, Golden Smog, Mark Mallman, Soul Asylum, the Old 97's Rhett Miller, Clay Aiken, the Wallflowers, Pete Yorn, Juliana Hatfield, Free Energy, Lizzo, Jeremy Messersmith, and Joseph Arthur.

== History ==
The Flowers building, in the Lowry Hill East neighborhood of Minneapolis, was formerly a greenhouse and floral shop before being used as a warehouse space for a guitar store. A self-described "gear freak," Ackerson had been a sound engineer at legendary Twin Cities club First Avenue and had already collected a wide variety of recording equipment on his own before deciding to start his own studio. Ackerson founded Flowers largely through money earned from his band Polara's contract with major label Interscope Records in the 1990s as well as an otherwise unsuccessful deal with Chris Blackwell's Palm Pictures. After Polara was dropped by Interscope, Ackerson went independent both as a musician with Polara and other bands, and as a producer at Flowers.

Ackerson got advice on constructing Flowers from veteran recording engineers including Glyn Johns and Fort Apache producer Paul Kolderie, and worked with acoustic designer Dave Ahl, who was the drummer for seminal punk band Suicide Commandos. The second floor of the building was partially removed to create high ceilings for capturing an acoustically friendly environment. The control room was built from the blueprints of Kolderie's studio, Fort Apache, in Massachusetts. The greenhouse space became a lounge. The studio's large, open space is designed to accommodate either a full band playing together or isolated multitrack recording.

Ackerson died of pancreatic cancer in October 2019. The studio remains open, now run by Ackerson's family; before his death, Ackerson chose Kris Johnson, guitarist in Minneapolis band Two Harbors, to be Flowers’ head engineer and studio manager.

In March 2023, the studio hosted a recording session with Alex Etheridge, a 13-year-old Phoenix musician suffering from bone cancer, and Soul Asylum singer Dave Pirner and bassist Jeremy Tappero. The meeting was set up through the nonprofit organization Kill Kancer, founded by Mary Beth Mueller, the widow of original Soul Asylum bassist Karl Mueller, who died of esophageal cancer in 2005. Ackerson's widow Ashley donated the studio time to Alex. At Flowers, the trio recorded Alex's song "Home Sweet Home". The song is about how Alex's thoughts of returning home helped him deal with being in the hospital. It was largely written by Alex himself, who had worked out the drums parts, lyrics, and main guitar riff before meeting with Soul Asylum. He and the band spent four hours in the studio working on the song, which was later released on SoundCloud."

== Approach to production ==
Ackerson took a holistic approach to making music, viewing composition, performance, recording and post-production all as steps in a single process of creating a song. He told an interviewer in Guitar Player magazine, "It's all part of the same thing—amps, guitars, effects. You're playing it all." In an interview for Tape Op magazine, he said that the energy and vibe of a performance was more important to him than technical perfection, saying that as a producer "sometimes you have to be willing to get out of the way of the moment."

== Selected discography ==
Polara, Formless/Functional (1998)
The Jayhawks, Smile (2000)
Mark Mallman and Vermont, Mark Mallman and Vermont (2001)
Mark Mallman, The Red Bedroom (2002)
Polara, Jetpack Blues (2002)
The Jayhawks, Rainy Day Music (2003)
Limbeck, Let Me Come Home (2005)
Sarah Lee Guthrie & Johnny Irion, Exploration (2005)
Brian Setzer, 13 (2006)
Golden Smog, Another Fine Day (2006)
The Replacements, Don't You Know Who I Think I Was? (songs "Message To the Boys" and "Pool & Dive," 2006)
The Brian Setzer Orchestra, Wolfgang's Big Night Out (2007)
Golden Smog, Blood On The Slacks (2007)
Metro Station, Metro Station (2008)
Polara, Beekeeping (2008)
Sing It Loud, Come Around (2008)
Motion City Soundtrack, My Dinosaur Life (song "History Lesson," 2010)
Farewell Continental, ¡Hey, Hey Pioneers! (2011)
Joseph Arthur, The Graduation Ceremony (2011)
I Was Totally Destroying It, Vexations (2012)
Mark Mallman, Double Silhouette (2012)
Motion City Soundtrack, Go (2012)
Soul Asylum, Delayed Reaction (2012)
A Great Big Pile Of Leaves, You're Always On My Mind (2013)
Houndmouth, From The Hills Below The City (2013)
Joseph Arthur, The Ballad of Boogie Christ (2013)
The Replacements, Songs for Slim (2013)
Mark Mallman, The End Is Not The End (2016)
Hippo Campus, Landmark (2017)
Hippo Campus, Bambi (2018)
The Jayhawks, Back Roads and Abandoned Motels (Legacy, 2018)
