= Let Me Come Home =

Let Me Come Home.

Studio album by Limbeck
- Released: August 9, 2005
- Genre: Rock; alternative country; indie rock
- Length: 39:31
- Label: Doghouse Records
- Producer: Gary Louris

Limbeck chronology
Hi, Everything's Great (2003)	Let Me Come Home. (2005)	Limbeck (2007)

Professional ratings
Review scores
Source	Rating
Allmusic	3.5/5 stars

Let Me Come Home is the third album by American rock band Limbeck. It was released in 2005 on Doghouse Records.

== Track listing ==
1. "People Don't Change" - 3:18
2. "Long Way to Go" - 2:52
3. "Everyone's In the Parking Lot" - 3:18
4. "Making the Rounds" - 2:43
5. "Sin City" - 4:10
6. "Usually Deluded" - 3:36
7. "Names for Dogs" - 2:05
8. "Watchin' the Moon Rise Over Town" - 2:19
9. "Home (Is Where the Van Is)" - 2:19
10. "Television" - 3:13
11. " To Hell with Having Fun" - 3:16
12. "I Saw You Laughing" - 3:42
13. "'91 Honda" - 2:42

== Personnel ==
- Robb MacLean - guitars, lead vocals, percussion, wind chimes, photography
- Patrick Carrie - guitars, backing vocals, electric sitar, harmonica, glockenspiel, gong, percussion
- Justin Entsminger - bass
- Matt Stephens - drums, percussion

== Additional artists ==
- Limbeck: Composer
- Ed Ackerson: Audio Production, Composer, Engineer, Farfisa Organ, Fender Rhodes, Mixing, Organ (Hammond), Percussion, Piano, Producer, Vocals, Wurlitzer
- Rachael Cantu: Vocals
- Jeff Lipton: Mastering
- Gary Louris: Accordion, Audio Production, Composer, Fender Rhodes, Glockenspiel, Percussion, Piano, Producer, Slide Guitar, Synthesizer, Vocals
- Justin Pierre: Vocals
- Nick Pritchard: Design, Layout Design
- Bryan Sheffield: Photography
