= The Benjamins =

American punk rock group, 1998 to 2001

The Benjamins were an American, Milwaukee, Wisconsin-based pop punk/rock band, that were together from 1998 to 2001.

== History ==
The Benjamins began with the lineup of brothers Jay Stys (vocalist/guitarist) and Chris Stys (drummer), guitarist Dan Hinz, and bassist Ron Forchette). Soon after, they were discovered at a local club by bassist Ben Perlstein (formerly with Milwaukee ska group The Invaders), who replaced Forchette, and brought drummer Jon Phillip (formerly with Shaft) into the group. The Benjamins recorded their first disc, Bordering on Boredom, on Labor Day of 1999. The EP features six songs that earned favorable attention for the band after the album was released in February 2000.

After garnering a solid fanbase throughout the Midwest — including shows with Alkaline Trio, The Mr. T Experience, and Superdrag — The Benjamins were interviewed for an online zine by a fan named Jared Blohm at a concert at the Rock 'n' Roll High School in Green Bay, Wisconsin. The fan turned out to be a street team representative for Drive-Thru Records, and after a brief courtship, the label agreed to sign the band. Their second release and first full-length album, The Art of Disappointment — featuring the production of the Grammy-nominated Nick Raskulinecz (Foo Fighters, Superdrag, Queens of the Stone Age), graphic design of former The Promise Ring guitarist Jason Gnewikow, and cover-modeling of Aiko Sakai — was released on the California-based Drive-Thru Records in February 2001. In May and June 2001, the band toured with Mock Orange. While constant touring was done in support on The Art of Disappointment, The Benjamins were regularly part of mismatched tours, including dates alongside Reel Big Fish, Sum 41, and Showoff, in addition to a brief stint on the 2001 Warped Tour. In October, the band reportedly broke up; the band initially denied this, before it was later confirmed.

=== Post-breakup ===
After the breakup, the members formed various bands: Philip formed Versa with a member of the Promise Ring, and Nice Outfit; and Hinz and Perlstein started Carolina, alongside a member of Camden, and the Drugs. In the years that followed, the band performed the occasional reunion show in Milwaukee, the last one being in 2004. Perlstein currently lives in New York City and works in music management, and his clients include Tommy Stinson/The Replacements, Smoking Popes and Trapper Schoepp & The Shades and runs Good Land Records with Jon Phillip. Following time in The Obsoletes with former members of Yesterday's Kids, Phillip joined the Orange County, California-based Limbeck in August 2005 until their disbanding in 2010. In 2011, Phillip both joined Trapper Schoepp & The Shades on drums and co-founded Good Land Records. Hinz has become a permanent member of Maritime with former members of The Promise Ring and The Dismemberment Plan. Stys remains based in Milwaukee, like Hinz and Phillip, and has moved over into the culinary world. The band reunited on July 10, 2013 at a local outdoor music festival for a brief, surprise set and that they will co-headline a benefit show at Turner Hall in Milwaukee with fellow Milwaukee underground legends Alligator Gun on January 18, 2014.

== Discography ==
=== Albums ===
- Bordering on Boredom (2000)
- The Art of Disappointment (2001)
- Back on Track (2014)

=== Non-album tracks ===
- "3720 to 1"
- "Just Like Heaven" (The Cure cover)
- "Prove My Love" (Violent Femmes cover)

== Members ==
- Dan Hinz — Guitar
- Jay Stys — Vocals/Guitar
- Jon Phillip — Drums
- Ben Perlstein — Bass
