= All the Young Dudes (disambiguation) =

"All the Young Dudes" is a 1972 song by David Bowie, recorded and released by Mott the Hoople.

All the Young Dudes may also refer to:

- All the Young Dudes (album), a 1972 Mott the Hoople album containing and named for the song
- All the Young Dudes (fan fiction), a 2018 Harry Potter fan fiction by MsKingBean89
- All the Young Dudes (radio show), a 2001 BBC drama radio show
- "All the Young Dudes", a 2019 episode of Carole & Tuesday
- "All the Young Dudes", a 2009 episode of Life on Mars
- "All the Young Dudes", a poem by Rowan Ricardo Phillips

== See also ==
- The Young Dudes, an indie rock band from California started in 2010
- All the Young Men, a 1960 film about the racial integration of the US military
