= Farewell Continental (EP) =

EP by Farewell Continental
- Released: May 25, 2009; 15 years ago
- Genre: Alternative rock
- Length: 12:58
- Language: English
- Label: Paper + Plastick
- Producer: Farewell Continental

Farewell Continental chronology
Farewell Continental (2009)	EP#2 (2010)

Farewell Continental is the first extended-play release by American alternative-rock band Farewell Continental, released on May 25, 2009, by Paper + Plastick.

== Track listing ==
1. "Depend on Me" – 4:08
2. "We Are Cosmonaut" – 2:25
3. "Do You Wanna Tangle?" – 4:19
4. "One Last Lunge of the Big Time Washed-Up" – 2:09

== Personnel ==
- Justin Pierre – vocals, guitar
- Kari Gray – vocals, keyboards
- Thomas Rehbein – guitar
- Jim Adolphson – bass
- Josh McKay – drums

== See also ==
- 2009 in music
