= Run All Night =

Run All Night may refer to:

- Run All Night (album), the 2006 debut indie rock/folk album of Rachael Cantu
- Run All Night (film), a 2015 action neo-noir gangster thriller starring Liam Neeson, Joel Kinnaman, Common, and Ed Harris
