= Bobby Patterson (musician) =

American singer

Bobby Patterson (born March 13, 1944, Dallas, Texas, United States) is an American musician, singer, songwriter and record producer.

Patterson produced records for Fontella Bass, Chuck Jackson, Ted Taylor, Shay Holiday, Roscoe Robinson, The Montclairs, Tommie Young, and Little Johnny Taylor. Albert King recorded the song "That's What the Blues is All About", which Patterson co-wrote. A version appeared on King's album I Wanna Get Funky. A song Patterson cowrote (with Strickland), "She Don't Have to See You", was recorded by Golden Smog for their 1995 album, Down by the Old Mainstream.

He recorded a live album at the Longhorn Ballroom in 2002.

Patterson worked as a DJ on the Dallas-based radio station KKDA 730 AM, until station owner Hyman Childs laid off most of KKDA's on-air staff, including Patterson, in May 2012.

Patterson released a new album, I Got More Soul!, in July 2014.
