= Come Around (Sing It Loud album) =

Studio album by Sing It Loud
- Released: September 23, 2008
- Studio: Flowers, Minneapolis, Minnesota
- Genre: Pop punk; power pop; neon pop punk
- Length: 36:15
- Label: Epitaph
- Producer: Joshua Cain

Sing It Loud chronology
Come Around EP (2008)	Come Around (2008)	Everything Collide (2010)

Professional ratings
Review scores
Source	Rating
AllMusic	3.5/5 stars
AbsolutePunk	57/100
Rock Sound	6/10 stars

Come Around is the debut studio album from American pop rock band Sing It Loud. It was released on Epitaph Records on September 23, 2008. The band toured with Valencia in August and September 2008, prior to their own headlining tour, and then a supporting slot for Cobra Starship until November 2008. On April 21, 2009, a music video was released for "Don't Save Me". Between June and August 2009, the band appeared on the Warped Tour.

== Track listing ==
All tracks by Sing it Loud

1. "I've Got a Feeling" – 2:54
2. "We're Not Afraid" (featuring Justin Pierre) – 2:57
3. "Come Around" – 3:22
4. "Don't Save Me" – 3:31
5. "Give it Up" – 3:13
6. "MPLS" – 3:13
7. "No One Can Touch Us" (featuring Alex Gaskarth) – 3:15
8. "Marionettes" – 3:47
9. "Over You" – 3:23
10. "Fade Away" – 2:45
11. "Best Beating Heart" – 3:47

== Personnel ==
- Pat Brown – lead vocals, guitar
- Kieren Smith – lead guitar, background vocals
- Nate Flynn – bass guitar
- Ben Peterson – keyboards
- Chris "Sick Boy" Lee – drums

The band's previous drummer, Dane Schmidt, plays drums and sings backup vocals on this album. He was replaced by Chris "Sick Boy" Lee several months after the album was recorded.

=== Additional credits ===
- Ed Ackerson – engineer
- Joshua Cain – producer
- Mark Trombino – mixing
- Eli Janney – engineer
- Dane Schmidt – drums, background vocals
- UE Nastasi – mastering
- Eric Gorvin – songwriter ("No One Can Touch Us")
- Claudio Rivera – drums
- Peter Anderson – percussion, assistant engineer
- Alex Gaskarth – additional vocals
- Justin Pierre – additional vocals
