= Ed Ackerson =

American musician and producer (1965–2019)

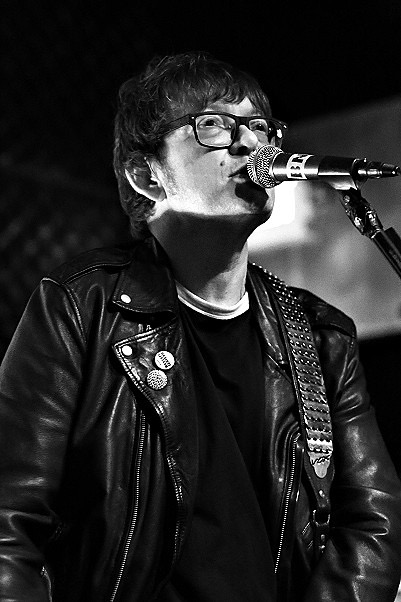

Background information
- Born: Edwin C. Ackerson; July 18, 1965; Stillwater, Minnesota
- Died: October 4, 2019 (aged 54) Minneapolis, Minnesota
- Genres: Indie rock, alternative rock
- Occupations: Singer, songwriter, producer, engineer
- Instruments: Guitar, drums
- Years active: 1989–2019
- Labels: Susstones, Interscope, Clean, Twin/Tone
- Formerly of: Polara, The 27 Various, BNLX, Antenna
- Website: Official website

Edwin C. Ackerson (July 18, 1965 – October 4, 2019) was an American musician and producer from Minneapolis. He produced or engineered dozens of records including works by prominent artists such as The Jayhawks, The Replacements, Motion City Soundtrack, Soul Asylum, Golden Smog, Dave Davies of The Kinks, Wesley Stace, Mason Jennings, Mark Mallman, John Strohm, Brian Setzer, Lizzo, Pete Yorn, The Wallflowers, Rhett Miller of The Old 97s, Jeremy Messersmith, and Juliana Hatfield. He owned a recording studio in Minneapolis, Flowers, and co-founded the Susstones record label. Ackerson led several notable Twin Cities pop/rock bands including Polara and The 27 Various, and released several solo records under his own name. He was also a prolific producer of albums by Twin Cities bands, and was regarded as one of the linchpins of the Minnesota music scene.

== Early life ==
Ackerson was born in Stillwater, Minnesota and was valedictorian of his high school class. In 1985, he turned down a scholarship to Yale to pursue a career in music in Minneapolis.

== Career ==
=== As musician ===
==== The Dig ====
Ackerson's early band The Dig, formed in the mid-1980s, was influenced by The Jam and 1960s English mod rock like The Who. Though the Dig earned critical praise for the single "Problem With Mary," Ackerson told an interviewer in 1997 that he felt the band had been too "angry," and determined to take a more positive tack with his next project.

==== The 27 Various ====
His next band, the 27 Various, blended Ackerson's mod influences with Syd Barrett-style psychedelia, both of which would continue to be touchstones throughout his career. The group's first two albums, 1987's Hi and 1989's Yes, Indeed, self-described by Ackerson as "whimsical," were limited releases on Ackerson's own Susstones label. The third, 1990's Approximately, moved to the larger label Clean (Twin/Tone), but despite the band's increased profile, the album suffered when Twin/Tone's distributor, Rough Trade, went out of business. Trouser Press writer Ira Robbins praised Approximately as a turning point "for Ackerson, who was on his way to becoming an assured and able multi-faceted rocker." The band put out two more records in 1992, the power-pop set Up and the more dreamlike Fine, before breaking up that year. Robbins called Up "another excellent showcase for Ackerson's thoughtfully modulated guitar playing and genre-jumping songwriting," praising his ability to work in many styles, and noted that the heavy distortion effects on Fine were a sign of the sound Ackerson would pursue in his next project, Polara. Bryan Carroll of Allmusic called Fine's blend of shoegazer and Brit-pop "near-perfect" and lamented that "probably due to promotion/distribution, the record never received the praise or audience it deserved."

==== Polara ====
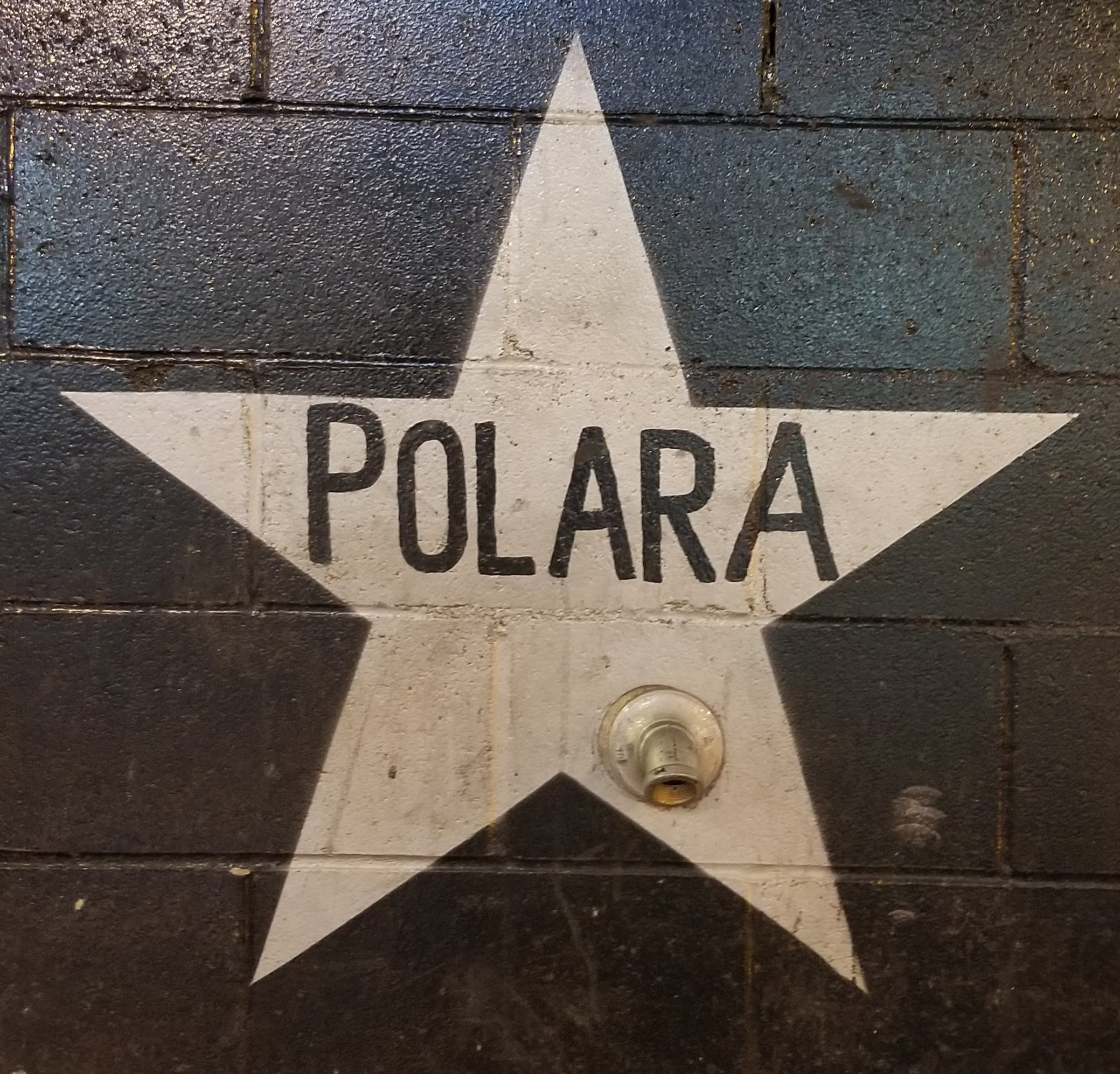
Polara's star on the outside mural of the Minneapolis nightclub First Avenue

After a short stint as second guitarist in Blake Babies singer John Strohm's band Antenna, Ackerson formed Polara with guitarist Jennifer Jurgens, bassist Jason Orris, and Trip Shakespeare's Matt Wilson on drums, continuing his interest in 1960s psychedelic pop but adding a heavy element of Krautrock-inspired electronics and keyboards. Polara was Ackerson's first band to gain significant national attention. The group released a self-titled debut in 1995, which Allmusic writer Rick Anderson called "weird but lovable" and "as fresh and bracing as a bucket of ice water in the face." Billboard writer Chris Morris called it "the first truly great album (I have) heard in 1995." Strohm also contributed to the debut album. Critical acclaim for the album led to a bidding war by several major labels; Polara eventually signed to Interscope for its second album, C'est La Vie, in 1997, with Peter Anderson replacing Wilson on drums. Billboard writer Deborah Russell called Ackerson and Polara the front of "the emergence of a new local (Twin Cities) scene" more interested in pop music and postpunk than the punk rock of bands like Hüsker Dü and the Replacements. Matt Hendrickson of Rolling Stone called him "the kingpin of a resurgent Minneapolis music scene." Though Ackerson produced most of C'est la Vie himself, the band also worked with prominent producers Alan Moulder (Smashing Pumpkins), Sean Slade, and Paul Q. Kolderie on several tracks. Ackerson took a holistic approach to making music, viewing composition, performance, recording and post-production all as steps in a single process of creating a song. He told an interviewer in Guitar Player magazine, "It's all part of the same thing—amps, guitars, effects. You're playing it all." Ackerson believed that constant experimentation with new sounds was at the heart of his songwriting approach with Polara, which he stated "would never make the same record twice." In contrast to Polara, his intention on C'est la Vie was to play more straightforward rock. "The first album had no lead (guitar parts), and that was very deliberate. I was kind of politicized about it. But when we started to get this record together I realized that I am a rock guitar player, and we felt like making a record more related to rock." A third album, Formless/Functional, followed in 1998. Despite a generally warm reception by critics (Trouser Press' Ira Robbins called it "stylish and sophisticated"), the album received little support from its record label. Corporate mergers involving Interscope soon led the label to drop many bands, including Polara. Ackerson put Polara on hold in favor of other projects, but Jurgens and new bassist Dan Boen rejoined Ackerson for 2002's Jetpack Blues, released on Susstones. Greg Winter of CMJ called Jetpack Blues "exquisite," with "short but sweet guitar solos and beautiful vocal harmonies." A final album, Beekeeping, came out in 2008.

Polara has been honored with a star on the outside mural of famed Twin Cities club First Avenue. Ackerson himself was a sound engineer at the club in the 1990s. The stars recognize performers that have played sold-out shows or have otherwise demonstrated a major contribution to the culture at the iconic venue. Receiving a star "might be the most prestigious public honor an artist can receive in Minneapolis," according to journalist Steve Marsh.

Polara composed an original score for the silent film The Fall of the House of Usher, which they performed live at the John Anson Ford Amphitheatre as part of the 2002 Los Angeles Film Festival. Polara's song "Scorched Youth Policy" appears on the soundtrack to the 1996 Jackie Chan film Supercop.

==== BNLX ====
In 2010, Ackerson started a new group, BNLX (named after the abbreviation for Belgium-Netherlands-Luxembourg) with his wife Ashley Ackerson. A blend of punk rock and Britpop, BNLX released about a dozen EPs and two albums on Susstones. The first four BNLX EPs, which were thematically connected and released consecutively over the course of 2010, were named No. 6 in a list of the top 10 Minnesota records of 2010 in the Star Tribune's annual survey of Twin Cities music critics. The 2015 BNLX album Good Light tied for 15th place in that year's edition of the same poll.

Ackerson also released two solo albums, Ed Ackerson and Ackerson2, in 2007 and 2008, as well as a 2002 instrumental album, Oblivion And Points Beyond, under the name Sideways.

=== As producer ===
A self-described "gear freak," Ackerson's abiding interest in recording technology and studio experimentation led to a successful career as a producer. In 1999, Ackerson opened a recording studio in Minneapolis, Flowers, so named because the space had formerly been a greenhouse. There, he produced or engineered records by nationally prominent artists and dozens of Twin Cities bands. With his friend John Kass, Ackerson also started a record label, Susstones, on which he would release much of his own music as well as that of many other Minneapolis bands. Ackerson was known for being collaborative and inventive in his work, and was described by many who worked with him, including the Jayhawks' Gary Louris and Motion City Soundtrack's Justin Pierre, as an extremely knowledgeable and experimental producer who was also humble and egalitarian.

The Jayhawks made three albums with Ackerson, including 2000's Smile and 2003's Rainy Day Music, one of the band's most commercially successful discs. 2018's Back Roads and Abandoned Motels was recorded in two sessions at Flowers, with Ackerson co-producing. Ackerson also worked several times with the Jayhawks-associated supergroup Golden Smog, which also included members of Soul Asylum, The Replacements, and Wilco, on their 2006 and 2007 albums Another Fine Day and Blood On The Slacks.

In 2006, Ackerson was asked by the Replacements to produce two songs for the Rhino Records retrospective set Don't You Know Who I Think I Was?, the tracks "Message To the Boys" and "Pool & Dive." He worked with the group again for the 2013 five-song EP Songs for Slim, a benefit for the critically ill Slim Dunlap.

Ackerson also worked frequently with Pierre, recording two of his bands at Flowers, Motion City Soundtrack's 2012 album Go and ¡Hey, Hey Pioneers! by Farewell Continental.

Ackerson was named Producer of the Year at the 2005 Minnesota Music Awards.

Flowers Studio remains open, now run by Ackerson's family; before his death, Ackerson chose Kris Johnson, guitarist in Minneapolis band Two Harbors, to be Flowers’ head engineer and studio manager.

== Selected discography ==
=== As musician ===
- The Dig, "Mr. Nobody"/"Send It Through The Post" and "Problem With Mary"/"Trains" 7-inch singles (1985, Susstones); compiled on Complete Studio Recordings 1985-86 (2002, Susstones)
- The 27 Various, Hi (1987, Susstones)
- The 27 Various, Yes, Indeed (1989, Susstones)
- The 27 Various, Approximately (1990, Clean/Twin/Tone)
- The 27 Various, Up (1992, Clean/Twin/Tone)
- The 27 Various, Fine (1992, Clean/Twin/Tone)
- Antenna, Hideout (Mammoth, 1993)
- Polara, Polara (1995, Clean/Restless)
- Polara, Pantomime EP (1996, Interscope)
- Polara, C'est La Vie (1997, Interscope)
- Polara, Formless/Functional (1998, Interscope)
- Polara, Jetpack Blues (2002, Susstones)
- Sideways, Oblivion And Points Beyond (2002, Susstones)
- Polara, Green Shoes EP (2006, Susstones)
- Ed Ackerson, Ed Ackerson (2007, Susstones)
- Polara, Beekeeping (2008, Susstones)
- Ed Ackerson, Ackerson2 (2008, Susstones)
- BNLX, EPs #1-4 (2010, Susstones)
- BNLX, LP (2012, Susstones)
- BNLX, Produit Collecté (Collected Product) (2013, Susstones)
- BNLX, Good Light (2015, Susstones)
- Polara, "Closer To Heaven" single (Susstones, 2020)

=== As producer ===
- The Blue Up?, Now EP (Still Sane Records, 1988)
- The Hang Ups, Comin' Through (Clean Records, 1993)
- The Hang Ups, He's After Me (Clean Records, 1993)
- John P. Strohm, Vestavia (Flat Earth Records, 1999)
- Mason Jennings, Birds Flying Away (2000)
- Mark Mallman, The Red Bedroom (Guilt Ridden Pop, 2002)
- Kraig Jarret Johnson, Kraig Jarret Johnson (2004)
- Sarah Lee Guthrie & Johnny Irion, Exploration (New West Records, 2005)
- Tim Easton, Ammunition (2006)
- Golden Smog, Another Fine Day (Lost Highway, 2006)
- The Replacements, Don't You Know Who I Think I Was? (songs "Message To the Boys" and "Pool & Dive," 2006)
- Golden Smog, Blood On The Slacks (Lost Highway, 2007)
- Motion City Soundtrack, My Dinosaur Life (song "History Lesson," 2010)
- Farewell Continental, ¡Hey, Hey Pioneers! (2011)
- I Was Totally Destroying It, Vexations (2012)
- Motion City Soundtrack, Go (Epitaph, 2012)
- Soul Asylum, Delayed Reaction (2012)
- A Great Big Pile Of Leaves, You're Always On My Mind (2013)
- The Replacements, Songs for Slim (2013)
- The Jayhawks, Back Roads and Abandoned Motels (Legacy, 2018)

=== As engineer ===
- John P. Strohm, Caledonia (1996)
- The Jayhawks, Smile (American Recordings, 2000)
- The Jayhawks, Rainy Day Music (American Recordings, 2003)
- Mark Mallman, Mr. Serious (2004)
- Clay Aiken, A Thousand Different Ways (2006)
- Metro Station, Metro Station (2007)
- John P. Strohm, Everyday Life (2007)
- Sing It Loud, Come Around (2008)
- Joseph Arthur, The Graduation Ceremony (2011)
- Joseph Arthur, The Ballad of Boogie Christ (2013)
- Dave Davies, I Will Be Me (2013)
- Wesley Stace, Wesley Stace's John Wesley Harding (2017)

=== Tribute album ===
- Various artists, Closer To Heaven: A Tribute To Ed Ackerson (Susstones, 2020)

== Personal life ==
Ackerson was married to his BNLX bandmate, Ashley Ackerson. The couple have a daughter.

== Death ==
Ackerson was diagnosed in 2018 with stage IV pancreatic cancer. He kept his illness private and continued working, but revealed the diagnosis publicly after Pete Townshend of The Who wished him good health and a speedy recovery onstage during a St. Paul concert in September 2019. Ackerson died less than a month later, on October 4, 2019. Friends and former bandmates set up a GoFundMe page to help pay for his family's medical expenses. A concert celebrating Ackerson's life was held at First Avenue February 15, 2020, which was also the 25th anniversary of Polara’s debut. Ackerson's bands played, as well as the Jayhawks, the Kraig Johnson Experience, Mark Mallman, and Two Harbors.

== Tribute album ==
On October 5, 2020, the first anniversary of Ackerson's death, the Susstones label released a 30-song tribute album via Bandcamp, Closer To Heaven: A Tribute To Ed Ackerson, featuring 30 bands reinterpreting Ackerson songs. Artists included The Jayhawks, Motion City Soundtrack, Tanya Donelly, Dandy Warhols, and The Ocean Blue. The title was taken from Polara's last single, which had been released as a digital-only track in 2009 and was nearly forgotten until its rediscovery during work on the tribute album; Susstones re-released it also on the same day as the tribute album's release. Profits from Closer To Heaven went to an education fund for Ackerson's daughter.
