= Jon Phillip =

American drummer (born 1979)

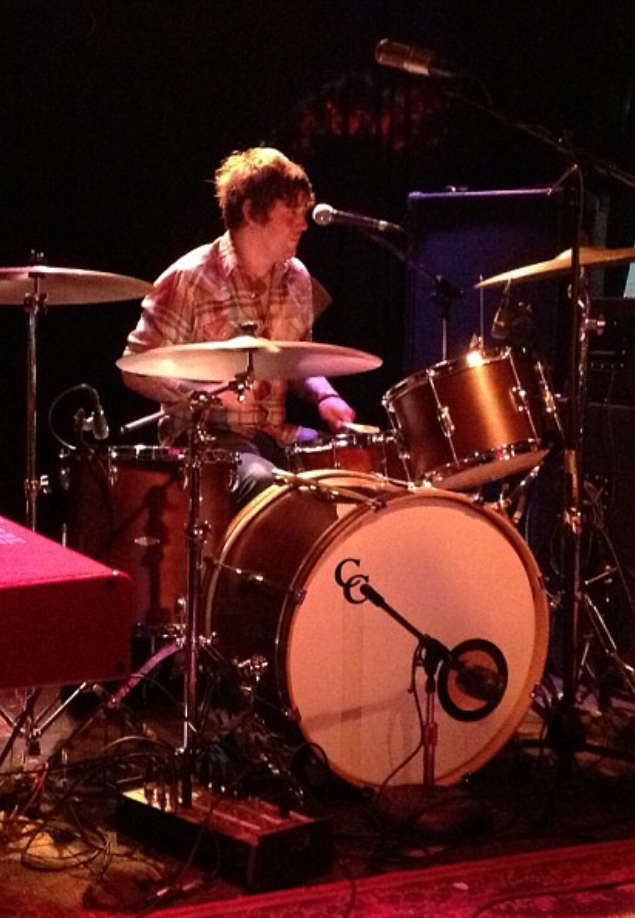
- Phillip live with the Paul Collins Beat at Record Bar (KCMO) in 2014

Background information
- Born: Jonathan Thomas Phillip; May 18, 1979 (age 47)
- Origin: Kenosha, Wisconsin, United States
- Genres: Americana, rock, punk rock, country, power pop
- Occupations: Musician, record producer
- Instruments: Drums, bass guitar, guitar, vocals
- Years active: 1993–present
- Website: goodlandrecords.com

Jon Phillip is an American rock musician who has played drums with Limbeck, The Benjamins, and The Obsoletes.

While living in Milwaukee, Wisconsin in late 2010, he co-founded Good Land Records with Andrew Wieland.

== Discography ==
- The Benjamins • Bordering on Boredom EP • self-released • 1999
- The Benjamins • The Art of Disappointment • Drive-Thru Records • 2001
- Limbeck • Hey, Everything's Fine. • Doghouse Records • 2003
- The Obsoletes • Is This Progress? • 1-4-5 Records • 2004
- Nob Dylan & His Nobsoletes • 12 Positively Stiff Dylans • Alternative Tentacles • 2005
- Limbeck • Limbeck • Doghouse Records • 2007
- Ben Weasel • The Brain That Wouldn't Die • Asian Man Records • 2009
- Trapper Schoepp & The Shades • Run, Engine, Run • (SideOneDummy Records • Good Land Records) • 2012
- Limbeck • Already Gone b/w Skyway 7" (SideOneDummy Records • Good Land Records) • 2012
- Frankie Lee • "Times Like This" from Rockin' Here Tonight, the Songs For Slim CD/LP compilation • New West Records • 2013
- Limbeck • "Sound Of Running" from While No One Was Looking, Toasting 20 Years of Bloodshot Records CD/LP compilation • Bloodshot Records • 2013
- The Benjamins • Back on Track EP • Good Land Records • 2014
- Dwight Twilley/Josh Berwanger • Shooting Stars b/w Some Other Guy 7" • Good Land Records • 2015
- Trolley • Caught In The Darkness • Easter Records • Sugarbush Records •2016
- Trapper Schoepp • Rangers & Valentines • Xtra Mile Recordings • 2016
- Josh Berwanger • Exorcism Rock • Doghouse Records • 2016
- Josh Berwanger • The Star Invaders • Good Land Records • 2017
- Mini Meltdowns • Mini Meltdowns 7" • Good Land Records • 2018
- Josh Berwanger/Casey James Prestwood • Cities b/w A New Kind of Love 7" • Lost Broadcast Records • 2019
- Cabin Essence • For Your Love b/w No More 7" • Good Land Records • 2019
- Josh Berwanger • Watching A Garden Die • Wiretap Records • 2019
- Mini Meltdowns • Destined For Disaster EP • Good Land Records • 2019
- Josh Berwanger • Happy In the Saddest Way • Good Land Records • 2020
