= Everything Collide =

Studio album by Sing It Loud
- Released: May 11, 2010
- Genre: Power pop
- Length: 37:15
- Label: Epitaph Records
- Producer: Jordan Schmidt

Sing It Loud chronology
Come Around (2008)	Everything Collide (2010)

Professional ratings
Review scores
Source	Rating
Allmusic	2.5/5 stars
AbsolutePunk	(73/100)

Everything Collide is the second release from the Minneapolis, Minnesota pop rock band Sing It Loud. It was released on Epitaph Records on May 11, 2010.

== Track listing ==
All tracks are written by All tracks by Sing it Loud, except where noted.

Everything Collide
No.	Title	Length
1.	"Sugar Sweet"	2:58
2.	"Thunderstorms"	3:47
3.	"Here With You" (Sing it Loud, Schmidt)"	3:04
4.	"Only One" (Sing It Loud, Cruz, Suarez)"	3:22
5.	"Addicted to When You're Gone"	3:12
6.	"Shadows"	3:21
7.	"Believe in Me"	4:06
8.	"Light it Up"	3:11
9.	"Letting Go"	4:04
10.	"I Can't"	2:44
11.	"Wonder Why"	3:26
Total length:		37:15

== Credits ==
- Pat Brown - Lead Vocals, Guitar
- Kieren Smith - Lead Guitar, background vocals, lead vocals on "Shadows"
- Nate Flynn - Bass Guitar
- Ben Peterson - Keyboards, Background vocals
- Chris "Sick Boy" Lee - Drums

=== Additional credits ===
- Jordan Schmidt - Composer on "Here With You", Engineer, Mixer, Producer
- Don Clark - Design
- Janice Cruz - Composer on "Only One"
- Todd Kolojeski - Engineer
- UE Nastasi - Mastering
- Rob Oesterlin - Assistant Engineer
- Mike Shipley - Mixing
- Alexandro Suarez - Composer on "Only One"
- Brian Wohlgemuth - Assistant, Pro-Tools
