= Hi, Everything's Great. =

Studio album by Limbeck
- Released: June 17, 2003
- Genre: Rock, Americana, alt-country
- Length: 37:40
- Label: Doghouse Records
- Producer: Ed Rose

Limbeck chronology
This Chapter Is Called Titles (2000)	Hi, Everything's Great. (2003)	Let Me Come Home (2005)

Professional ratings
Review scores
Source	Rating
Allmusic	link

Hi, Everything's Great. is the second album by Doghouse Records recording artist Limbeck. Limited Editions of the album came with the companion disc, Hey, Everything's Fine., which included the whole album done live, and acoustic with many of their close friends. The vinyl edition of the record features two bonus tracks "Yeah Totally" and "The State".

== Track listing ==
1. "Honk + Wave" – 3:28
2. "Silver Things" – 3:01
3. "Julia" – 2:48
4. "This Place is Deserted" – 2:56
5. "I Wrote This Down" – 3:18
6. "The Sun Woke the Whole State" – 3:39
7. "Tan + Blue" – 3:32
8. "Gamblin' Man" – 3:10
9. "In Ohio on Some Steps" – 3:33
10. "Brand New Orange" – 2:46
11. "Albatross + Ivy" – 2:01
12. "Comin' From Tucson" – 3:28

== Personnel ==
- Robb MacLean - electric and lap steel guitars, vocals, banjo, percussion, photography
- Justin Entsminger - bass
- Matt Stephens - drums
- Patrick Carrie - electric and lap steel guitars, vocals, banjo

=== Additional musicians ===
- Rachael Cantu: Vocals
- Chris Cron: Fender Rhodes, Hammond B3, Organ, Piano
- Ed Rose: Percussion
