= Pantomime (Polara EP) =

1996 EP by Minneapolis alternative rock band Polara

EP by Polara
- Released: November 5, 1996
- Genre: Alternative rock, indie rock
- Length: 15:23
- Label: Interscope
- Producer: Ed Ackerson

Polara chronology
Polara (1995)	Pantomime (1996)	C'est la Vie (1997)

Pantomime is a 1996 five-song EP by Minneapolis alternative rock band Polara, released shortly before their second full-length C'est la Vie, their major-label debut for Interscope Records.

Though bandleader Ed Ackerson produced most of Pantomime and C'est La Vie himself, the band also worked with Alan Moulder (Smashing Pumpkins), Sean Slade, and Paul Q. Kolderie on several tracks. Completing C'est La Vie took longer than anticipated, so the band released an EP, Pantomime, in November 1996 before the full-length album which was ready the following April.

== Reception ==
Professional ratings
Review scores
Source	Rating
AllMusic	2.5/5 stars
Trouser Press	(positive)

The EP was well-received by critics. The Los Angeles Times pop-music critic Robert Hilburn said that "the music filters '90s sensibilities with all sorts of classic rock elements—from Beatles and Stones to R.E.M.—in the manner of Oasis and the Smashing Pumpkins. Polara serves warning in this EP that it has the vision and command to be a major player." Jenny Eliscu of CMJ New Music Monthly said that "the real meat of each Polara song is comprised of a sharp, shining hook, a bouncy rhythm and an immediately accessible vocal melody. But since Ackerson's looked at sound boards from both sides now, there are always plenty of sound effects to act as the dressing on these tunes—a bit of Moog or Farfisa, some low-grade feedback or an unidentifiable drone." Bryan Carroll of AllMusic said that the EP combined electronica, "a progressive political sensibility, and a love of cavernously huge-sounding production with the conventions of alternative rock," but felt that the music "sounds flat and half-baked."

== Track listing ==
All tracks are written by Ed Ackerson.

No.	Title	Length
1.	"Pantomime"	2:31
2.	"Idle Hands"	3:30
3.	"Light the Fuse and Run"	3:52
4.	"Confusing Times"	3:01
5.	"Pantomime (Kindler and Gentler Version)"	2:33
