= C'est la Vie (Polara album) =

1997 album by Minneapolis alternative rock band Polara

Studio album by Polara
- Released: April 22, 1997
- Genre: Alternative rock, indie rock
- Length: 54:43
- Label: Interscope Records
- Producer: Ed Ackerson

Polara chronology
Pantomime (1996)	C'est la Vie (1997)	Formless/Functional (1998)

Professional ratings
Review scores
Source	Rating
Allmusic	3.5/5 stars
Los Angeles Times	3/4 stars
Rolling Stone	3.5/5 stars
Trouser Press	(positive)

C'est la Vie is the second album by Minneapolis alternative rock band Polara, and their first for Interscope Records.

The group was founded and led by musician and producer Ed Ackerson after the breakup of his previous band, the 27 Various, with guitarist Jennifer Jurgens, bassist Jason Orris, and Trip Shakespeare's Matt Wilson on drums. The new group continued his interest in 1960s mod-rock and Syd Barrett-style psychedelia and added a heavy element of Krautrock-inspired electronics and keyboards. Critical acclaim for Polara's 1995 self-titled debut album led to a bidding war by several major labels; Polara eventually signed to Interscope Records, with Peter Anderson replacing Wilson on drums.

The album was recorded in 1996 in sporadic sessions in between tours. Though Ackerson produced most of C'est La Vie himself, the band also worked with prominent producers Alan Moulder (Smashing Pumpkins), Sean Slade, and Paul Q. Kolderie on several tracks. Completing the album took longer than anticipated, so the band released an EP, Pantomime, in November 1996 before the full-length was ready the following April. Ackerson took a holistic approach to making music, viewing composition, performance, recording and post-production all as steps in a single process of creating a song. He told an interviewer in Guitar Player magazine, "It's all part of the same thing—amps, guitars, effects. You're playing it all." Ackerson believed that constant experimentation with new sounds was at the heart of his songwriting approach with Polara, which he stated "would never make the same record twice." In contrast to Polara, his intention on C'est la Vie was to play more straightforward rock. "The first album had no lead (guitar parts), and that was very deliberate. I was kind of politicized about it. But when we started to get this record together I realized that I am a rock guitar player, and we felt like making a record more related to rock."

== Reception ==
The album was well received by critics. Los Angeles Times pop-music critic Robert Hilburn called it "a work for all rock eras, a collection of exceptionally accessible tunes combining the memorable melodic hooks found in the best classic rock with the attitude and bite of the most polished '90s alternative rock" such as Smashing Pumpkins and Oasis. Alec Foege of Rolling Stone said that Polara was "one of the first indie bands to have computerization as second nature … seething with textured noise samples and programmed atmospheric squiggles." He called the band's approach more than just a novelty, but "a genuine glimpse at mainstream rock's plausible near future." Trouser Press writer Ira Robbins described the record as similar in concept to Polara's previous album: "psychedelic distortion, wild sound for the hell of it, crossed with tuneful songwriting and innocently cryptic lyrics." Ned Raggett of Allmusic compared the album to Spiritualized and Oasis, and called it "a partially over-the-top but still enjoyable hour's worth of songs."

== Personnel ==
- Ed Ackerson: vocals, guitar, synthesizer, sampler, loops
- Jennifer Jurgens: vocals, guitar, organ, synthesizer, sequencer
- Jason Orris: bass guitar, vocals
- Peter Anderson: drums, percussion
- John Strohm: other
- Erik Mathison: snare on "Elasticity"
- Mastered by Bob Ludwig, Brian Lee, Brian Dunton
- Produced by Ed Ackerson
- Recorded by Ed Ackerson and Jason Orris
- "Transformation" mixed by Alan Moulder, Matt Sime
- "Sort It Out," "Idle Hands" mixed by Paul Q. Kolderie, Sean Slade
- Recorded at Terrarium Studio, Minneapolis
- Mixed at The Church, London, and Fort Apache
- Mastered at Gateway Mastering Studios and Fort Apache

== Track listing ==
All tracks are written by Ed Ackerson.

No.	Title	Length
1.	"Transformation"	3:21
2.	"Sort It Out"	3:54
3.	"Light the Fuse and Run"	3:47
4.	"Quebecois"	3:28
5.	"So Sue Me"	3:22
6.	"Make It Easy"	2:55
7.	"Incoming"	3:04
8.	"Elasticity"	4:26
9.	"Idle Hands"	3:26
10.	"Other Side"	3:54
11.	"Pantomime"	2:12
12.	"Shanghai Bell"	7:51
13.	"Untitled"	9:03
