= Down by the Old Mainstream =

Studio album by Golden Smog
- Released: 1995
- Recorded: Pachyderm Studio; The Terrarium and Triclops Recording
- Genres: Americana; alternative country
- Length: 50:17
- Label: Rykodisc
- Producers: Golden Smog, Sir James Bunchberry

Golden Smog chronology
On Golden Smog (1992)	Down by the Old Mainstream (1995)	Weird Tales (1998)

Down by the Old Mainstream is the debut album by American alternative country band Golden Smog, released in 1995. Its title is from a line in both the Wilco song "Someday Soon" from the album, Being There, and from "Radio King", the last track on this album.

== Background ==
Golden Smog was a loosely connected group of musicians comprising, at various times, members of Soul Asylum, the Replacements, Wilco, the Jayhawks, Run Westy Run, the Honeydogs and Big Star. Golden Smog's lineup has often changed, but relative constants who appear on all the recordings are guitarists Kraig Johnson (Run Westy Run), Dan Murphy (Soul Asylum) and Gary Louris (the Jayhawks), along with bassist Marc Perlman (the Jayhawks).

== Reception ==
Professional ratings
Review scores
Source	Rating
AllMusic	4/5 stars
Chicago Tribune	3/4 stars
Christgau's Consumer Guide	(neither)
Entertainment Weekly	B
NME	8/10

Writing for AllMusic, music critic Stephen Thomas Erlewine called the album "a loose, relaxed affair that sounds like it was a lot of fun to record...it has an offhand, relaxed charm that is sometimes lacking from Jayhawks and Soul Asylum albums. Not all of the songs are first rate—'Pecan Pie' and 'Red Headed Stepchild' are a bit too cute to be effective—but the performances are full of grit and fire, which is what makes Down By the Mainstream such an engaging listen." Jeff Gordinier of Entertainment Weekly wrote, "Golden Smog’s comfort food cries out for a little spice, but it warms you up, nonetheless."

== Track listing ==
1. "V" (Gary Louris, Kraig Johnson)
2. "Ill Fated" (Dan Murphy)
3. "Pecan Pie" (Jeff Tweedy)
4. "Yesterday Cried" (Johnson)
5. "Glad & Sorry" (Ronnie Lane)
6. "Won't Be Coming Home" (Louris, Mark Olson)
7. "He's a Dick" (Johnson)
8. "Walk Where He Walked" (Tweedy)
9. "Nowhere Bound" (Marc Perlman, Murphy, Johnson)
10. "Friend" (Johnson)
11. "She Don't Have to See You" (Bobby Patterson, Strickland)
12. "Red Headed Stepchild" (Murphy, Perlman)
13. "Williamton Angel" (Johnson)
14. "Radio King" (Tweedy, Louris)

== Personnel ==
The band members of Golden Smog used pseudonyms in the credits.

- Rodney Amber (Joey Huffman) – organ, piano
- Andrew Conlee – background vocals
- Jarret Decatur (Kraig Johnson) – Chamberlin, drums, guitar, Bass, harmonica, mandolin, piano, slide guitar, tambourine, vocals, background vocals
- Anthony James (Dave Pirner) – vocals
- Michael Macklyn (Gary Louris) – guitar, piano, slide guitar, vocals, background vocals
- Leonardson Saratoga (Noah Levy) – drums, sound effects, tambourine, background vocals
- David Spear (Dan Murphy) – guitar, vocals, background vocals
- Scot Summit (Jeff Tweedy) – bass, guitar, vocals, background vocals
- Raymond Virginia (Marc Perlman) – bass, E-Bow, fuzz bass, guitar, mandolin, background vocals

== Production notes ==
- Sir James Bunchberry (Brian Paulson) – engineer, mixing, producer
- Clive Mills – executive producer
- Scott Hull – mastering
- Rip Nordhaugan – photography
- Brent Sigmeth – assistant engineer
- Michael Sommens – drawing
- Ken Lau – photography
- Kraig Jarret – art direction, design

== Charts ==
Chart (1996)	Peak position
US Heatseekers Albums (Billboard)	14
