= Polara (album) =

Self-titled 1995 debut album by Minneapolis alternative rock band Polara

Studio album by Polara
- Released: February 14, 1995
- Genres: Alternative rock, indie rock
- Length: 46:27
- Label: Clean (Twin/Tone)
- Producer: Ed Ackerson

Polara chronology
Polara (1995)	Pantomime (1996)

Polara is the first album by Minneapolis alternative rock band Polara.

The group was founded and led by musician and producer Ed Ackerson. The band was considered one of the most prominent and creative groups to emerge from Minneapolis in the 1990s. Billboard writer Deborah Russell called Ackerson and Polara the front of "the emergence of a new local (Twin Cities) scene" more interested in pop music and postpunk than the punk rock of bands like Hüsker Dü and the Replacements, and Matt Hendrickson of Rolling Stone called him "the kingpin of a resurgent Minneapolis music scene." After the breakup of his previous band, the 27 Various, and a short stint as second guitarist in Blake Babies singer John Strohm's band Antenna, Ackerson formed Polara in 1994 with guitarist Jennifer Jurgens, bassist Jason Orris, and Trip Shakespeare's Matt Wilson on drums. The new group continued his interest in 1960s mod-rock and Syd Barrett-style psychedelia and added a heavy element of Krautrock-inspired electronics and keyboards. Released on the Twin Cities label Clean (Twin/Tone), Polara built on the 27 Various' increasing critical buzz, gaining significant national attention. Besides the main band members, Strohm also contributed on multiple instruments.

== Reception ==
Professional ratings
Review scores
Source	Rating
AllMusic	4/5 stars
Rolling Stone	3.5/5 stars

The album was well-received by critics. Los Angeles Times music critic Robert Hilburn called it a "wonderfully appealing indie debut" with "solid songwriting craft … sweet melodies and soulful introspection." AllMusic writer Rick Anderson called it "weird but lovable" and "as fresh and bracing as a bucket of ice water in the face," and said that the band's ability to shift between musical styles made it hard to pigeonhole. Billboard writer Chris Morris called it "the first truly great album (I have) heard in 1995." Another Billboard review called the song "Counting Down" "one of the best modern rock singles of the year." Paul Evans of Rolling Stone praised Ackerson's production, saying "he that delivers sheer infectious fun—songs packed with sing-along choruses and catchy, heavily reverbed effects." Joe Gore of Guitar Player called the album "an inspired blend of blissful pop melody and whacked-out psychedelia," comparing it favorably with Medicine and My Bloody Valentine. Trouser Press writer Ira Robbins called it "challenging, uneven and rewarding," and that Polara's sound offered "a door opening to many new possibilities" for Ackerson's love of studio experimentation.

Critical acclaim for Polara led to a bidding war by several major labels; Polara eventually signed to Interscope Records for its second album, C'est la Vie, in 1997.

== Track listing ==
All tracks are written by Ed Ackerson.

No.	Title	Length
1.	"Counting Down"	4:15
2.	"Allay"	5:03
3.	"Source of Light"	2:53
4.	"Squelch"	3:59
5.	"Listening Now"	4:45
6.	"Taupe"	2:54
7.	"Avenue E"	4:06
8.	"Anniversary 6"	4:23
9.	"One Foot"	2:33
10.	"a+b=y"	4:43
11.	"State"	3:06
12.	"Letter Bomb"	3:47

== Personnel ==
- Ed Ackerson: bass, guitar, Moog synthesizer, organ, percussion, piano, programming, sampling, vocals
- Jennifer Jurgens: vocals
- Jason Orris: electronics
- Matt Wilson: drums
- Lisa Klipsic: loop, background vocals, wah wah piano
- Jay Hurley, Matt Olson: background vocals
- John P. Strohm: drums, guitar, loops, sampling, vocals, wah wah piano
- Produced by Ed Ackerson
- Engineered by Ed Ackerson and Jason Orris
- Ronald Clark: cover design
