= A Great Big Pile of Leaves =

US musical group

- Origin: Brooklyn, New York, U.S.
- Genres: Indie rock, emo revival
- Years active: 2007–present
- Members: Pete Weiland; Tyler Soucy; Tucker Yaro
- Past members: Matt Fazzi
- Website: agreatbigpileofleaves.com

A Great Big Pile of Leaves is an American indie rock band from Brooklyn, New York, currently signed to Topshelf Records. It was founded by guitarist/singer Pete Weiland and drummer Tyler Soucy, who began creating and recording their music in 2007. After the release of their first two EPs The Fiery Works and The Fiery Works II, Tucker Yaro joined the group. The trio then recorded their first full-length album, Have You Seen My Prefrontal Cortex?. In November 2011, the band released two EPs entitled Boom! and Live from the Living Room with Topshelf Records. Both EPs were released on limited edition vinyl and are also available for digital download. Their third LP, Pono_{,} was released on August 13, 2021.

== Formation ==
A Great Big Pile of Leaves formed when Farewell to Arms, a band that Weiland and Soucy were in, split up. The duo then moved from Connecticut to Brooklyn, New York and released their first two EPs. Tucker Yaro then joined the band as the bassist and they began playing live shows. Along with their music, the band are known for their unique name. In an interview with AMP, Tyler Soucy, the band's drummer, said that Weiland and himself "would always go to this brewery in [his] hometown after writing and recording. We’d sit there for hours talking about names, Google searching to see what had been taken, and it probably took us about a month to settle on the name A Great Big Pile of Leaves. It was actually one of Pete’s first suggestions and it seemed to be the name that we kept circling back to, and one day it just stuck. I think it’s pretty memorable and I’d like to think it stands out from the sea of band names out there today." He also described the name as being "a throwback to being a kid and having fun".

== The Fiery Works 1 & 2 ==
In 2007, Soucy and Weiland began work on the first of the two EPs entitled The Fiery Works I & II respectively. Both EPs were home recorded using recording equipment that both members had collected. On November 21, 2007 the duo released The Fiery Works I. Following the success of the first EP, A Great Big Pile of Leaves released their second EP on April 17, 2008. The artwork for both albums was created by close friend of the group, Justin Michael Smith.

== Have You Seen My Prefrontal Cortex? ==
In the Fall of 2009, A Great Big Pile of Leaves started recording for their new album. The band released a series of YouTube videos showing the recording process for the album. On June 16, 2010, a video was released for the song 'Alligator Bop'. On June 22, 2010, the band released their debut full-length album Have You Seen My Prefrontal Cortex?. The album was released on vinyl November 9, 2010. On January 16, a new music video for 'We Don't Need Our Heads' premiered on AbsolutePunk. The video features footage of the song being played while touring with Saves the Day, Motion City Soundtrack and Say Anything. Following the release of the album, the band also toured with The Appleseed Cast and Hellogoodbye.

== Boom! and Live from the Living Room ==
It was announced on 4 August 2011 that the band were to be releasing two new acoustic EPs on Topshelf Records. After playing a headline show on 23 October 2011, the band released both on November 1. Boom! is an acoustic studio EP while Live from the Living Room was recorded at a party in manager, Jesse Johnson's living room. Both EPs were released on limited edition vinyl as well as digital download.

== Making Moves EP ==
On 4 February 2012, A Great Big Pile of Leaves announced that they will be releasing an EP on MAD Dragon Records and Motion City Soundtrack's new record label, The Boombox Generation. The EP will be part of a series of EPs to be released on the label between April and November 2012. The EP was released on 24 July 2012. In March and April 2012, the band headlined a US tour with Young Statues and Mansions. On 25 June 2012, Matt Fazzi officially joined the band after being a touring guitarist during many of their 2011 and 2012 shows.

== You're Always On My Mind ==
In early 2012, the band also announced that they have been in the pre-production and writing stages for a new full-length record. On 30 July 2012, the band began the recording process for their second LP with producer Ed Ackerson. On August 10, Justin Pierre of Motion City Soundtrack contributed guest vocals to the album. The recording process lasted two weeks and was completed on 12 August 2012. On 16 January 2013, the band announced that Roger Seibel would be mastering the album. On 27 March 2013, the band revealed their second album would be titled You're Always On My Mind and was subsequently released on July 2 by Topshelf Records.

The record debuted on the following Billboard charts:

Heatseekers: #15
Alternative New Artist: #8
Vinyl: #9
Internet: #20
Independent Albums: #89

== Pono ==
After eight years without a release, on 7 July 2021, the band announced their upcoming album Pono; the album was released by Topshelf Records on 13 August 2021. The album was produced by the band and recorded primarily at their home studio, mixed by touring guitarist Matthew Weber at Gradwell House Recording, and mastered by Dave Downham (Beach Slang, Into It. Over It.). The announcement came with the release of the album's first single "Beat Up Shoes".

== Discography ==
=== Studio albums ===
- Have You Seen My Prefrontal Cortex? (2010)
- You're Always on My Mind (2013)
- Pono (2021)

=== EPs ===
- The Fiery Works (2007)
- The Fiery Works II (2008)
- Boom! (2011)
- Live from the Living Room (2011)
- Making Moves (2012)

=== Singles ===
- "Beat Up Shoes" (2021)

=== Music videos ===
- "Alligator Bop" (2010)
- "We Don't Need Our Heads" (2011)
- "Vampires in Love" (Live) (2011)
- "Snack Attack" (2013)
