= Jetpack Blues =

2002 album by Minneapolis alternative rock band Polara

Studio album by Polara
- Released: October 22, 2002
- Studio: Flowers Studio
- Genre: Alternative rock, indie rock
- Length: 45:31
- Label: Susstones Records
- Producer: Ed Ackerson

Polara chronology
Formless/Functional (1998)	Jetpack Blues (2002)	Beekeeping (2008)

Professional ratings
Review scores
Source	Rating
Allmusic	2.5/5 stars
Trouser Press	(positive)
CMJ	(positive)
Pitchfork	7.5/10 stars
babysue	5/6 stars

Jetpack Blues is a 2002 album by Minneapolis alternative rock band Polara, their fourth full-length record, and first after breaking with Interscope Records and going independent. It was released on bandleader Ed Ackerson's Susstones Records label, and produced by Ackerson at his recording studio, Flowers, which he founded by reinvesting the money from the band's Interscope deal as well as an otherwise unsuccessful deal with Chris Blackwell's Palm Pictures.

The lineup on Jetpack Blues included founding members Ackerson and guitarist Jennifer Jurgens, as well as bassist Dan Boen. Rather than a single drummer, the album featured three percussionists and a drum machine. Gary Louris of The Jayhawks plays lead guitar on "Obsolete," and Blake Babies and Antenna frontman John Strohm arranged the horn section on the song "Is This It?"

== Reception ==
Trouser Press writer Ira Robbins named Jetpack Blues the best of Polara's career, calling it "a modern Anglo-American power-pop noisefest that pushes hard and really gets somewhere. ... The album surges with energy, enthusiasm and a personable tone that cuts through the daunting curtain of sound." Chris Riemenschneider of the Minneapolis-St. Paul Star Tribune compared Jetpack Blues to My Bloody Valentine, calling it "a genuine blast, full of richly noisy, orchestrated guitar parts and layered Brit-pop melodies." Greg Winter of CMJ called Jetpack Blues "exquisite," with "short but sweet guitar solos and beautiful vocal harmonies." Eric Carr of Pitchfork was enthusiastic about the title track, calling it "sterling space-gospel," but less so about the rest of the album, which he called "solid, uptempo kernels of sci-fi sounds (that) begin to blend together into what might as well be a single (albeit damn fine) forty-minute epic." Robert L. Doerschuk of Allmusic wrote that "each track feels sleek and streamlined, with massive textural depth," but felt that the music was "formulaic and, worse, dispirited." A reviewer for the online magazine babysue praised the album as "exceptional" and "full of slick melodic pop music with superb vocals and wild guitar work."

== Personnel ==
- Ed Ackerson: Vocals, guitar, bass, organ, piano, synthesizer, loops, percussion
- Jennifer Jurgens: Vocals, guitar, piano, organ, synthesizer
- Dan Boen: Bass, synthesizer
- Erik Mathison: Drums on "Is This It?," "Obsolete," "Other," "The Story So Far"
- Peter Anderson: Drums on "Jetpack Blues," "Is This It?," "Sweep Me Away," "Wig On"
- Marc Iwanin: Drums on "Other"
- Gary Louris: Lead guitar on "Obsolete"
- Janey Winterbauer: Backing vocals on "Wig On"
- John Strohm: Horn arrangement on "Is This It?"
- Producer: Ed Ackerson
- Mastered by Jeff Lipton
- Ed Ackerson, Jennifer Jurgens: Design
- Nick Tangborn, Tricia Boland: Design concept

Recorded at Flowers Studio, Minneapolis

== Track listing ==
All tracks are written by Ed Ackerson.

No.	Title	Length
1.	"Can't Get Over You"	3:48
2.	"Jetpack Blues"	5:02
3.	"Is This It?"	4:24
4.	"Sweep Me Away"	4:25
5.	"Wig On"	4:08
6.	"Obsolete"	4:54
7.	"Hold on to the Thread"	3:02
8.	"Overboard"	4:02
9.	"Other"	3:56
10.	"The Story So Far"	4:46
11.	"Eight by Twelve"	3:04
