= Beekeeping (album) =

2008 album by Minneapolis alternative rock band Polara

Studio album by Polara
- Released: May 6, 2008
- Studio: Flowers Studio
- Genre: Alternative rock, indie rock
- Label: Susstones Records
- Producer: Ed Ackerson

Polara chronology
Jetpack Blues (2002)	Beekeeping (2008)

Professional ratings
Review scores
Source	Rating
Trouser Press	(positive)
City Pages	(positive)
WeHeartMusic	4/5 stars
Star Tribune	(positive)

Beekeeping is a 2008 album by Minneapolis alternative rock band Polara, their fifth and final full-length release. It was released on bandleader Ed Ackerson's Susstones Records label and produced by Ackerson at his recording studio, Flowers.

Released six years after the band's previous album Jetpack Blues and a few months after the more introspective solo album Ed Ackerson, the lineup on Beekeeping included founding members Ackerson and guitarist Jennifer Jurgens, as well as drummer Peter Anderson.

During this period, the band's live group included Jayhawks guitarist Marc Perlman, Tim Oesau, and Ackerson's wife Ashley Ackerson, who also led the group The Mood Swings.

== Reception ==
Trouser Press writer Ira Robbins praised the album as "a straightforward guitar pop album with few digressions that drops Polara right back in action with all of its strengths not only intact but more smoothly integrated than ever."

Chris Riemenschneider of the Minneapolis-St. Paul Star Tribune said that after the mellower Ed Ackerson album, Beekeeping had brought Ackerson back "to the feistier, fuzzier sound of his old band", comparing the sound to a more "psychedelic" Stone Roses.

A reviewer for the music blog WeHeartMusic said that "Polara possesses what I consider the classic Twin Cities rock sound" and that Beekeeping "filled me with a sort of heady euphoria that will have me buzzing around the neighborhood for hours." Andrea Myers of City Pages said that Polara "masterfully balance the accessibility of hooky Britpop with the oddity of adding layers of fuzz and feedback to an otherwise clean sound."

== Track listing ==
All tracks are written by Ed Ackerson.

No.	Title	Length
1.	"Longest Day"	3:46
2.	"Game Over"	3:14
3.	"Another Phase"	3:29
4.	"Talk Me Down"	3:44
5.	"E Flat"	3:38
6.	"Beekeeping"	3:24
7.	"Both Ends Burning"	3:00
8.	"So Long"	2:57
9.	"Out Of Your Hands"	4:11
10.	"Happy Ending"	3:49
11.	"Live And Learn"	3:47
