= Formless/Functional =

1998 album by Minneapolis alternative rock band Polara

Studio album by Polara
- Released: March 24, 1998
- Studio: Flowers Studio
- Genre: Alternative rock, indie rock
- Label: Interscope Records
- Producer: Ed Ackerson

Polara chronology
| C'est la Vie (1997) | Formless/Functional (1998) | Jetpack Blues (2002) |

Professional ratings
Review scores
| Source | Rating |
|---|---|
| Allmusic | 2.5/5 stars |
| Trouser Press | (positive) |
| babysue | 6/6 stars |

Formless/Functional is a 1998 album by Minneapolis alternative rock band Polara, their third full-length album and their last for Interscope Records.

Despite a generally warm reception by critics, the album received little support from its record label. Corporate mergers involving Interscope soon led the label to drop many bands, including Polara.

== Reception ==
Trouser Press writer Ira Robbins described the album as "frisky electro-dance" that moved Polara's sound "into the rhythmatic post-guitar realm of synthesizers, loops and samples," and noted that Jurgens' contributions to the band were especially prominent. Although he felt that "the album goes on a bit too long," Robbins called it "stylish and sophisticated" and said that songwriter and producer Ed Ackerson's "creativity is no less colorful or effective in this realm." Jason Anderson of Allmusic wrote that Ackerson's "ability to completely ignore stylistic boundaries is admirable," but felt that the album did not have a cohesive theme and "sounds thrown together and random." A reviewer for the online magazine babysue praised the album's mix of introspective pop and electronic production, calling it "completely cool" and "absolutely beautiful."

== Personnel ==
- Ed Ackerson: Vocals, guitar, bass, organ, piano, synthesizer, samples, sequences, programming
- Jennifer Jurgens: Vocals, guitar, organs, synthesizer
- Peter Anderson: Drums, percussion
- Engineered by Ed Ackerson (Flowers Studio) and Jason Orris (Terrarium Studio)
- Mastered by Stephen Marcussen
- Design by Ron Clark

== Track listing ==
All tracks are written by Ed Ackerson.

| No. | Title | Length |
|---|---|---|
| 1. | "Whassup?" | 3:54 |
| 2. | "A Brighter Day" | 3:55 |
| 3. | "Trainwreck" | 4:25 |
| 4. | "Got The Switch!" | 3:03 |
| 5. | "Halo" | 2:54 |
| 6. | "Peaking Charlie" | 2:21 |
| 7. | "I Can Believe" | 1:44 |
| 8. | "Semi-Detached" | 3:55 |
| 9. | "Verging" | 1:45 |
| 10. | "Midtown Greenway" | 3:10 |
| 11. | "Tread Lightly" | 3:53 |
| 12. | "Corporate Hegemony (Smash The State!)" | 3:37 |
