= Weird Tales (album) =

Studio album by Golden Smog
- Released: October 13, 1998
- Recorded: Ardent Studios, Memphis, The Terrarium, Minneapolis
- Genre: Alternative country
- Length: 55:48
- Label: Rykodisc
- Producer: Brian Paulson

Golden Smog chronology
| Down by the Old Mainstream (1995) | Weird Tales (1998) | Another Fine Day (2006) |

Weird Tales is American band Golden Smog's second album, released in 1998. The title comes from the pulp magazine Weird Tales; the cover art, by Margaret Brundage, is from the October 1933 issue.

== Reception ==
Professional ratings
Review scores
| Source | Rating |
|---|---|
| AllMusic | 3/5 stars |
| The A.V. Club | B+ |
| Entertainment Weekly | A− |

Writing for AllMusic, music critic Michael Gallucci wrote of the album "...as expected, the best songwriters here (Gary Louris of the Jayhawks and Wilco's Jeff Tweedy) contribute Weird Tales' most solid tracks. A pet project aimed more toward fans of the genre than the casual listener, Golden Smog nonetheless deliver the goods with a good deal of twangy heart and soul." Joshua Klein of The A.V. Club wrote the album "reveals that even a musical goof-off can develop into a potent band in its own right." and called it "a first-rate collaboration that's unified in both vision and spirit." The Washington Post called the group's sound "melodic, economical -- if not especially ambitious -- country-rock."

== Track listing ==
1. "To Call My Own" (Dan Murphy) – 3:31
2. "Looking Forward to Seeing You" (Kraig Johnson) – 2:47
3. "Until You Came Along" (Gary Louris) – 4:59
4. "Lost Love" (Jeff Tweedy) – 3:00
5. "If I Only Had a Car" (Johnson, Louris) – 4:03
6. "Jane" (Louris, Marc Perlman) – 4:29
7. "Keys" (Johnson, Louris) – 3:28
8. "I Can't Keep From Talking" (Tweedy) – 3:50
9. "Reflections on Me" (Murphy) – 2:53
10. "Making Waves" (Johnson) – 4:01
11. "White Shell Road" (Louris) – 4:14
12. "Please Tell My Brother" (Tweedy) – 2:10
13. "Fear of Falling" (Jody Stephens, Louris, Tweedy) – 3:31
14. "All the Same to Me" (Sparks, Tweedy) – 3:05
15. "Jennifer Save Me" (Louris, Johnson) – 4:47

== Personnel ==
- Jeff Tweedy – vocals, guitar, bass guitar, harmonica, percussion
- Gary Louris – vocals, guitar, organ, Mellotron, background vocals
- Dan Murphy – vocals, guitar, piano, drums, background vocals, Mellotron, Wurlitzer
- Kraig Johnson – vocals, guitar, bass guitar, piano, background vocals
- Marc Perlman – guitar, bass guitar, background vocals
- Jody Stephens – drums, percussion, bells
- Jim Dickinson – Wurlitzer
- Jessy Greene – violin, background vocals
- Jim Boquist – background vocals
- Jason Orris – background vocals
- Bryan Hanna – tambourine, background vocals
- Brian Paulson – Minimoog

Production notes

- Brian Paulson – producer
- Jason Orris – engineer
- Bryan Hanna – engineer
- Pete Matthews – engineer, assistant engineer
- Jim Scott – mixing
- Mike Scotella – mixing assistant
- Steve Marcusson – mastering

== Chart positions ==
| Year | Chart | Position |
|---|---|---|
| 1998 | Billboard Heatseekers Albums | 34 |
