= Another Fine Day =

Studio album by Golden Smog
- Released: July 18, 2006
- Recorded: Paco Loco Studios; Flowers Studio
- Genre: Folk Rock, Alt-Country
- Length: 1:04:03
- Label: Lost Highway
- Producer: Paco Loco

Golden Smog chronology
Weird Tales (1998)	Another Fine Day (2006)	Blood on the Slacks (2007)

Another Fine Day is Golden Smog's third full-length album. It was released on July 18, 2006. It reached number 95 on the Billboard 200 chart.

== Background ==
Golden Smog's lineup was chiefly made up of Kraig Johnson (Run Westy Run), Dan Murphy (Soul Asylum) Jeff Tweedy (Wilco) and Gary Louris and bassist Marc Perlman (both of The Jayhawks). It had been 8 years since 1998's Weird Tales release by the group. In the meantime, the Jayhawks broke up and Soul Asylum went on hiatus. Tweedy's band Wilco had achieved success with albums such as Yankee Hotel Foxtrot and A Ghost Is Born.

Another Fine Day features vocals by Tweedy, Murphy and Louris. It included a cover version of The Kinks' 1970 song "Strangers".

== Reception ==
Professional ratings
Review scores
Source	Rating
Allmusic	3.5/5 stars
Pitchfork Media	(6.4/10)

Writing for Allmusic, music critic Mark Deming wrote of the album "Another Fine Day sounds less scattershot and more unified than Golden Smog's earlier efforts, which makes sense since the core of this band had been working together for years, and the results seem less like a genially thrown-together side project than the work of a real band. The only drawback for fans is this Golden Smog doesn't bear much aural resemblance to the band that made Down by the Old Mainstream and Weird Tales; then again, the bands who make up Golden Smog's membership don't sound much like they did back then, either, so that shouldn't come as much of a surprise." Marc Hogan of Pitchfork Media writes "the relaxed spirit of the album's predecessors remains, even as the sound has grown a little bit more rock'n'roll. Non-supergroup supergroups at least aren't likely collar-poppers, but that doesn't mean they're always perversely super; sometimes strangely fine is enough for family fun."

== Track listing ==
1. "You Make It Easy" (Gary Louris, Kraig Jarret Johnson) – 4:12
2. "Another Fine Day" (Louris, Dan Murphy) – 4:18
3. "5-22-02" (Louris, Johnson, Marilyn) – 3:46
4. "Long Time Ago" (Jeff Tweedy, Louris) – 2:59
5. "Corvette" (Golden Smog) – 3:46
6. "Beautiful Mind" (Louris, Johnson) – 6:20
7. "Listen Joe" (Louris, Tweedy) – 5:13
8. "Cure for This" (Marc Perlman) – 3:44
9. "Hurricane" (Murphy) – 4:04
10. "Strangers" (Dave Davies) – 3:22
11. "Frying Pan Eyes" (Johnson, Louris) – 4:22
12. "Gone" (Louris) – 5:12
13. "Never Felt Before" (Murphy) – 3:42
14. "I Can" (Johnson, Louris, Ackerson) – 3:34
15. "Think About Yourself" (Johnson, Louris) – 5:24

== Personnel ==
- Kraig Jarrett Johnson – vocals ("I Can", "You Make It Easy", "5-22-02", "Beautiful Mind", "Frying Pan Eyes", "Think About Yourself"), bass acoustic guitar, piano
- Daniel Murphy – guitar, ebow slide guitar, vibrato guitar, electric piano, vocals ("Corvette", "Hurricane", "Never Felt Before")
- Gary Louris – piano, guitar, electric slide guitar, acoustic slide guitar, fuzz guitar, 12-string acoustic guitar, banjo, Wurlitzer, piano, SK-60 keyboard, glockenspiel, omnichord, synthesizer, Mellotron, lead vocals ("Another Fine Day", "Corvette", "Listen Joe", "Cure For This", "Strangers", "Gone", "Think About Yourself"), backing vocals
- Marc Perlman – bass guitar, guitar
- Ed Ackerson – percussion, piano, Hammond organ, Wurlitzer
- Jeff Tweedy – guitars, banjo, vocals ("Long Time Ago", "Strangers", "Listen Joe"), screwdriver guitar solo ("Think About Yourself"), backing vocals
- Linda Pitmon – drums
- Jody Stephens – drums, percussion
- Holly Marilyn – backing vocals
- Jose Guillanot – trombone
- Francis Salas – saxophone
- Miguel Angel Minoz – trumpet
- Jim Boquist – backing vocals
- Muni Camon – vocals ("Cure For This")

== Chart positions ==
Year	Chart	Position
2006	Billboard Top 200 Albums	95
