= On Golden Smog =

EP by Golden Smog
- Released: December 11, 1992
- Recorded: Pachyderm (Cannon Falls, Minnesota)
- Genre: Alternative country
- Length: 21:54
- Label: Crackpot Records
- Producer: Paul Pacific

Golden Smog chronology
On Golden Smog (1992)	Down by the Old Mainstream (1995)

On Golden Smog is the debut EP from American band Golden Smog, released in 1992.

== Background ==
Golden Smog was a loosely connected group of musicians comprising, at various times, members of Soul Asylum, The Replacements, Wilco, The Jayhawks, Run Westy Run, The Honeydogs and Big Star. Golden Smog's lineup has often changed, but relative constants who appear on all the recordings are guitarists Kraig Johnson (Run Westy Run), Dan Murphy (Soul Asylum) and Gary Louris (The Jayhawks), along with bassist Marc Perlman (The Jayhawks).

The album consists entirely of cover songs. The album sleeve art was by the band's then-drummer, Chris Mars. The track "Shooting Star" was featured in the 1994 film Clerks.

On Golden Smog was reissued in 1996 by Rykodisc.

== Reception ==
Professional ratings
Review scores
Source	Rating
Allmusic	2.5/5 stars

Writing for Allmusic, music critic Jason Ankeny wrote of the album "After a few years of haphazard shows in and about their native Minneapolis, the members of Golden Smog were approached by a small local label to put out a record; many, many beers later, On Golden Smog appeared."

== Track listing ==
1. "Son (We've Kept the Room Just the Way You Left It)" – 4:26 - A Michaelangelo cover.
2. "Easy to Be Hard" – 3:20 - A Hair Cover. (Sung by The Jayhawks' Gary Louris)
3. "Shooting Star" – 4:44 - A Bad Company Cover. (Sung by Soul Asylum's Dave Pirner).
4. "Back Street Girl" – 3:55 - A Rolling Stones Cover.
5. "Cowboy Song" – 5:29 - A Thin Lizzy Cover. (Sung by Soul Asylum roadie, Bill Sullivan).

== Personnel ==
The band members of Golden Smog used pseudonyms in the credits.

- Anthony James (Dave Pirner) – vocals
- Johnny Vincent (Bill Sullivan) – voices
- David Spear-Way (Dan Murphy) – vocals, voices in your head, guitar, ocarina
- Jarret Decatur-Laine (Kraig Johnson) – vocals, guitar, choreography, light show
- Raymond Virginia-Circle (Marc Perlman) – bass, staplegun, fish, synthesizer
- Eddie Garfield-Avenue (Chris Mars) – drums, kazoo
- Michael Macklyn-Drive (Gary Louris) – vocals, bass pedals, kettle drums, string arrangements
- The Straight Shooter Chorus – background vocals

== Production notes ==
- Paul Pacific – producer
- Sir James Bunchberry – engineer
- Chris Mars – artwork
- Dave Pinsky – editing
- Bonnie Lynn Butler – photography
- Dave Biljan – design
