= Farewell Continental =

American rock band

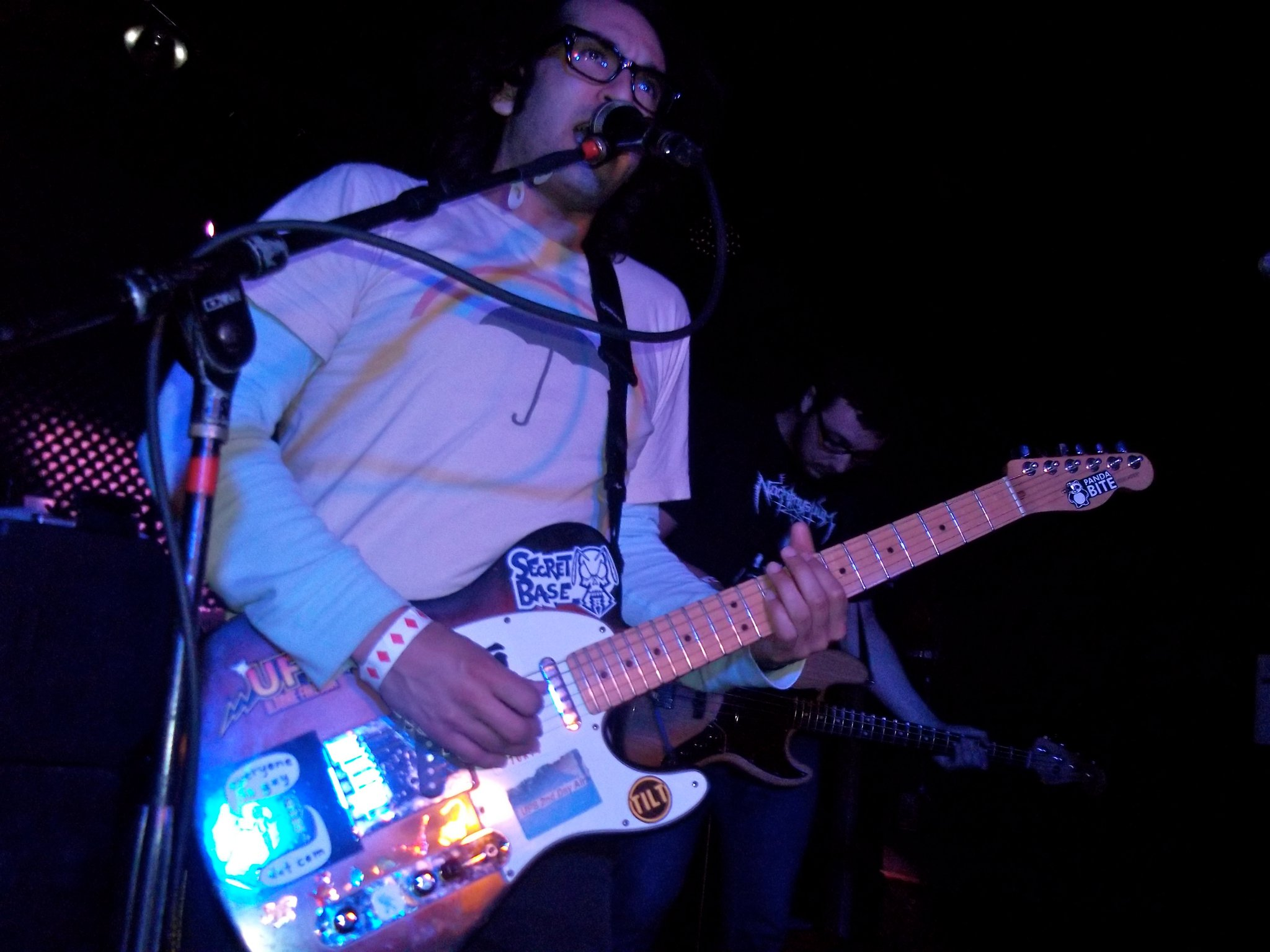
- Farewell Continental perform at the Rock and Roll Hotel in Washington, DC in 2011

Background information
- Origin: Minneapolis, Minnesota, U.S.
- Genres: Alternative rock, Indie rock, Emo
- Years active: 2007–2019
- Label: Paper + Plastick
- Members: Justin Pierre; Kari Gray; Thomas Rehbein; Jim Adolphson; Josh McKay
- Website: Official website

Farewell Continental is an American rock band from Minneapolis, Minnesota, formed in 2007. The group is the side project of Motion City Soundtrack frontman, Justin Pierre. The group also features keyboardist and vocalist Kari Gray, guitarist Thomas Rehbein, bassist Jim Adolphson and drummer Josh McKay. They have released two EPs and a full-length LP through Paper + Plastick Records.

== History ==
The group began in 2007 consisting of Justin Pierre and Thomas Rehbein. Pierre was in the middle of recording the album, Even If It Kills Me with his other band, Motion City Soundtrack and decided to make something considerably less poppy. In early 2008, they added three additional members, Kari Gray, Jim Adolphson and Josh McKay to round out the lineup.

In a Twitch stream with Joshua Cain, Justin talked about the importance of producer Ed Ackerson, saying he was "kind of like our sixth member." After Ackerson's death in 2019, Justin felt that the group was finished, saying "I feel like I would totally do other music, but I think that band is done." Though he did express interest in releasing unfinished material recorded with Joshua Cain.

== Tours ==
The group did a short tour in February 2011 with The Jealous Sound, as well as a full US tour with Gold Motel in the summer of 2011.

== Members ==
- Justin Pierre – vocals, guitar (2007–present)
- Kari Gray – vocals, keyboards (2008–present)
- Thomas Rehbein – guitar (2007–present)
- Jim Adolphson – bass (2008–present)
- Josh McKay – drums (2008–present)

== Discography ==
- Farewell Continental (2009)
- EP #2 (2010)
- ¡Hey, Hey Pioneers! (2011)
