= Polara (band) =

Alternative rock band from Minneapolis

- Origin: Minneapolis, Minnesota, United States
- Genres: Alternative rock, indie rock
- Years active: 1994–2019
- Labels: Clean Records, Interscope Records, Susstones Records
- Members: Ed Ackerson: guitar, vocals, production Peter Anderson: drums Jennifer Jurgens: guitar, vocals, organ Jason Orris: bass, vocals Dan Boen: bass Matt Wilson: drums
- Website: susstones.com

Polara is an American alternative rock band formed in 1994 by Ed Ackerson, a musician and producer from Minneapolis, Minnesota. The band was considered one of the most prominent and creative groups to emerge from Minneapolis in the 1990s. Billboard writer Deborah Russell called Ackerson and Polara the front of "the emergence of a new local (Twin Cities) scene" more interested in pop music and postpunk than the punk rock of bands like Hüsker Dü and The Replacements.

== Formation ==
Ackerson's previous band, the 27 Various, blended 1960s mod-rock influences with Syd Barrett-style psychedelia, and released five albums between 1987 and 1992—the first two limited releases on Ackerson's own Susstones label, and the others on the larger label Clean (Twin/Tone). Despite an increasingly visible profile and critical praise over the course of its career, the band's prospects suffered when Twin/Tone's distributor, Rough Trade, went out of business. Nevertheless, Ackerson was seen as a rising star. Trouser Press writer Ira Robbins, in an overview of Ackerson's career, called the Various' album Approximately a turning point "for Ackerson, who was on his way to becoming an assured and able multi-faceted rocker," and noted that the heavier sound Ackerson would pursue in Polara was starting to be apparent on the 27 Various' final album, 1992's Fine. After a short stint as second guitarist in Blake Babies singer John Strohm's band Antenna, Ackerson formed Polara in 1994 with guitarist Jennifer Jurgens, bassist Jason Orris, and Trip Shakespeare's Matt Wilson on drums, continuing his interest in 1960s psychedelic pop but adding a heavy element of Krautrock-inspired electronics and keyboards.

== Career ==
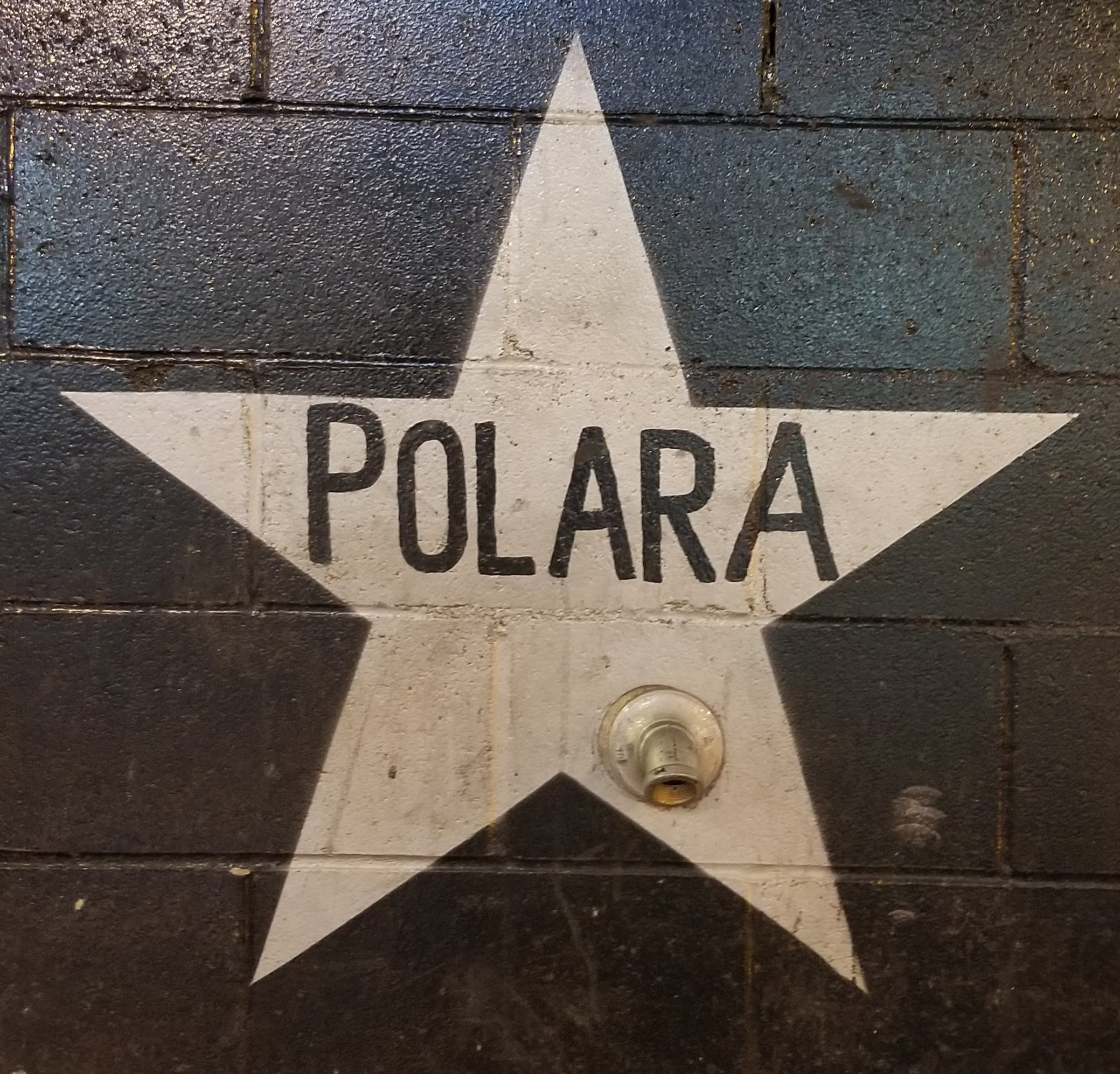
Polara's star on the outside mural of the Minneapolis nightclub First Avenue

Polara was Ackerson's first band to gain significant national attention. The group released a self-titled debut in 1995, which Allmusic writer Rick Anderson called "weird but lovable" and "as fresh and bracing as a bucket of ice water in the face." Billboard writer Chris Morris called it "the first truly great album (I have) heard in 1995." Strohm also contributed to the debut album. Critical acclaim for Polara led to a bidding war by several major labels; Polara eventually signed to Interscope for its second album, C'est La Vie, in 1997, with Peter Anderson replacing Wilson on drums. Though Ackerson produced most of C'est La Vie himself, the band also worked with prominent producers Alan Moulder (Smashing Pumpkins), Sean Slade, and Paul Q. Kolderie on several tracks. Ackerson took a holistic approach to making music, viewing composition, performance, recording and post-production all as steps in a single process of creating a song. He told an interviewer in Guitar Player magazine, "It's all part of the same thing—amps, guitars, effects. You're playing it all." Ackerson believed that constant experimentation with new sounds was at the heart of his songwriting approach with Polara, which he stated "would never make the same record twice." In contrast to Polara, his intention on C'est la Vie was to play more straightforward rock. "The first album had no lead (guitar parts), and that was very deliberate. I was kind of politicized about it. But when we started to get this record together I realized that I am a rock guitar player, and we felt like making a record more related to rock." A third album, Formless/Functional, followed in 1998. Despite a generally warm reception by critics (Trouser Press Ira Robbins called it "stylish and sophisticated"), the album received little support from its record label. Corporate mergers involving Interscope soon led the label to drop many bands, including Polara. Ackerson put Polara on hold in favor of other projects, but Jurgens and new bassist Dan Boen rejoined Ackerson for 2002's Jetpack Blues, released on Susstones. Greg Winter of CMJ called Jetpack Blues "exquisite," with "short but sweet guitar solos and beautiful vocal harmonies." A final album, Beekeeping, came out in 2008.

Polara has been honored with a star on the outside mural of famed Twin Cities club First Avenue. Ackerson himself was a sound engineer at the club in the 1990s. The stars recognize performers that have played sold-out shows or have otherwise demonstrated a major contribution to the culture at the iconic venue. Receiving a star "might be the most prestigious public honor an artist can receive in Minneapolis," according to journalist Steve Marsh.

Polara composed an original score for the silent film The Fall of the House of Usher, which they performed live at the John Anson Ford Amphitheatre as part of the 2002 Los Angeles Film Festival. Polara's song "Scorched Youth Policy" appears on the soundtrack to the 1996 Jackie Chan film Supercop.

After Polara, Ackerson started a new group, BNLX (named after the abbreviation for Belgium-Netherlands-Luxembourg) with his wife Ashley Ackerson. He also released two solo albums, Ed Ackerson and Ackerson2, in 2007 and 2008, as well as a 2002 instrumental album, Oblivion And Points Beyond, under the name Sideways.

Ackerson died on October 4, 2019, of pancreatic cancer.

=== Tribute album ===
On October 5, 2020, the first anniversary of Ackerson's death, the Susstones label released a 30-song tribute album via Bandcamp, Closer To Heaven: A Tribute To Ed Ackerson, featuring 30 bands reinterpreting Ackerson songs. Artists included The Jayhawks, Motion City Soundtrack, Tanya Donelly, Dandy Warhols, and The Ocean Blue. The title was taken from Polara's last single, which had been released as a digital-only track in 2009 and was nearly forgotten until its rediscovery during work on the tribute album; Susstones re-released it also on the same day as the tribute album's release. Profits from Closer To Heaven went to an education fund for Ackerson's daughter.

== Selected discography ==
=== Singles ===
- "Millepore of Florida" (1994, Generator)
- "Monongahela" (1995, Generator)
- "Carpet of Horses" (1996, Generator, b/w Red Red Meat, "Listening Now")
- "Closer To Heaven" (2020, Susstones)

=== Albums and EPs ===
- Polara (1995, Clean/Restless)
- Pantomime EP (1996, Interscope)
- C'est la Vie (1997, Interscope)
- Formless/Functional (1998, Interscope)
- Jetpack Blues (2002, Susstones)
- Green Shoes EP (2006, Susstones)
- Beekeeping (2008, Susstones)

=== Tribute album ===
Various artists, Closer To Heaven: A Tribute To Ed Ackerson (Susstones, 2020)
