= The Young Dudes =

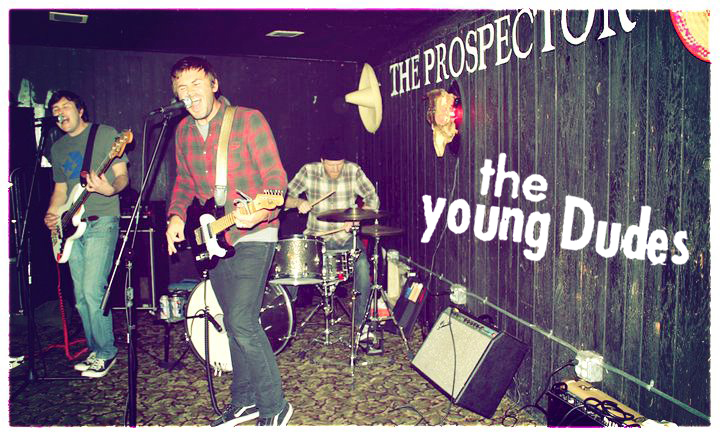
- The Young Dudes at the Prospector

Background information
- Origin: California, United States
- Genres: Indie rock
- Years active: 2010-Present
- Labels: Unsigned
- Members: Robb MacLean; Patrick Carrie; Gabe Palmer
- Website: http://theyoungdudes.net

The Young Dudes are an indie rock band from California.

== Background ==
On December 11, 2010 the Limbeck Twitter feed was updated to say "Robb and Patrick have a new band called The Young Dudes." The Young Dudes played their first concert, a house show, with Hellogoodbye in Silver Lake, California on December 10, 2010. Their first single -- "I Got Nothing Cool"—was released on December 12, 2010 as a free download.

In August 2011, The Young Dudes played two shows in San Francisco at The Fillmore with Motion City Soundtrack.

=== Singles ===
- I Got Nothing Cool
