= Blood on the Slacks =

Studio album by Golden Smog
- Released: April 24, 2007
- Genre: Pop, rock
- Length: 24:53
- Label: Lost Highway
- Producer: Ed Ackerson, Paco Loco, Golden Smog

Golden Smog chronology
Another Fine Day (2006)	Blood on the Slacks (2007)

Blood on the Slacks is the fourth full-length album by the American band Golden Smog. It was released by Lost Highway Records on April 24, 2007, less than a year after their previous album, Another Fine Day. The album's name is a play on Bob Dylan's 1975 album Blood On The Tracks. It was the first release from the group to not feature the Wilco frontman Jeff Tweedy as part of the lineup since 1992's On Golden Smog.

== Reception ==
Professional ratings
Review scores
Source	Rating
Allmusic	3.5/5 stars

Writing for Allmusic, music critic Mark Deming praised Louris' song "Without a Struggle" and wrote of the album "Blood on the Slacks' pearly moments suggest these guys might be saving some of their top-shelf ideas for this band for a change, even if they didn't spend a lot of time sweating over the finished product."

== Track listing ==
1. "Can't Even Tie Your Own Shoes" (Kraig Jarret Johnson, Gary Louris, Dan Murphy) – 3:09
2. "Starman" (David Bowie) – 4:42
3. "Look At You Now" (Louris) – 3:04
4. "Scotch on Ice" (Johnson, Louris, Murphy) – 3:14
5. "Magician" (Johnson, David Pirner) – 1:20
6. "Without a Struggle" (Louris, Murphy, Mark Perlman) – 3:14
7. "Tarpit" (J Mascis) – 3:07
8. "Insecure" (Murphy) – 3:03

== Personnel ==
- Gary Louris – vocals, background vocals, synthesizer, guitar, harmonica, piano, Glockenspiel, Mellotron
- Dan Murphy – vocals, background vocals, guitar, piano, slide guitar
- Kraig Jarret Johnson – vocals, background vocals, guitar, piano
- Marc Perlman – bass, percussion, conga, drums, tambourine, background vocals
- Ed Ackerson – percussion, background vocals
- Peter Anderson – drums, percussion, background vocals
- Muni Camón – vocals
- Jose Guillanot – trombone
- Miguel Ángel Muñoz – trumpet
- Linda Pitmon – drums
- Francis Salas – saxophone

== Production notes ==
- Ed Ackerson – producer, engineer, mixing
- Paco Loco – producer, engineer
- Richard Dodd – mastering
- John Fields – mixing
- Anna Marie Gabriel – art direction, design
- Jim Gavenus – photography
- Jennifer Turner – artwork
- Kim Buie – A&R
