= Sing It Loud =

American pop rock band

- Origin: Minneapolis, Minnesota, U.S.
- Genres: Pop punk, pop rock
- Years active: 2007–2010
- Label: Epitaph
- Past members: Pat Brown; Nate Flynn; Ben Peterson; Kieren Smith; Christopher Lee; Dane Schmidt

Sing It Loud was an American pop rock band from Minneapolis, Minnesota.

== History ==
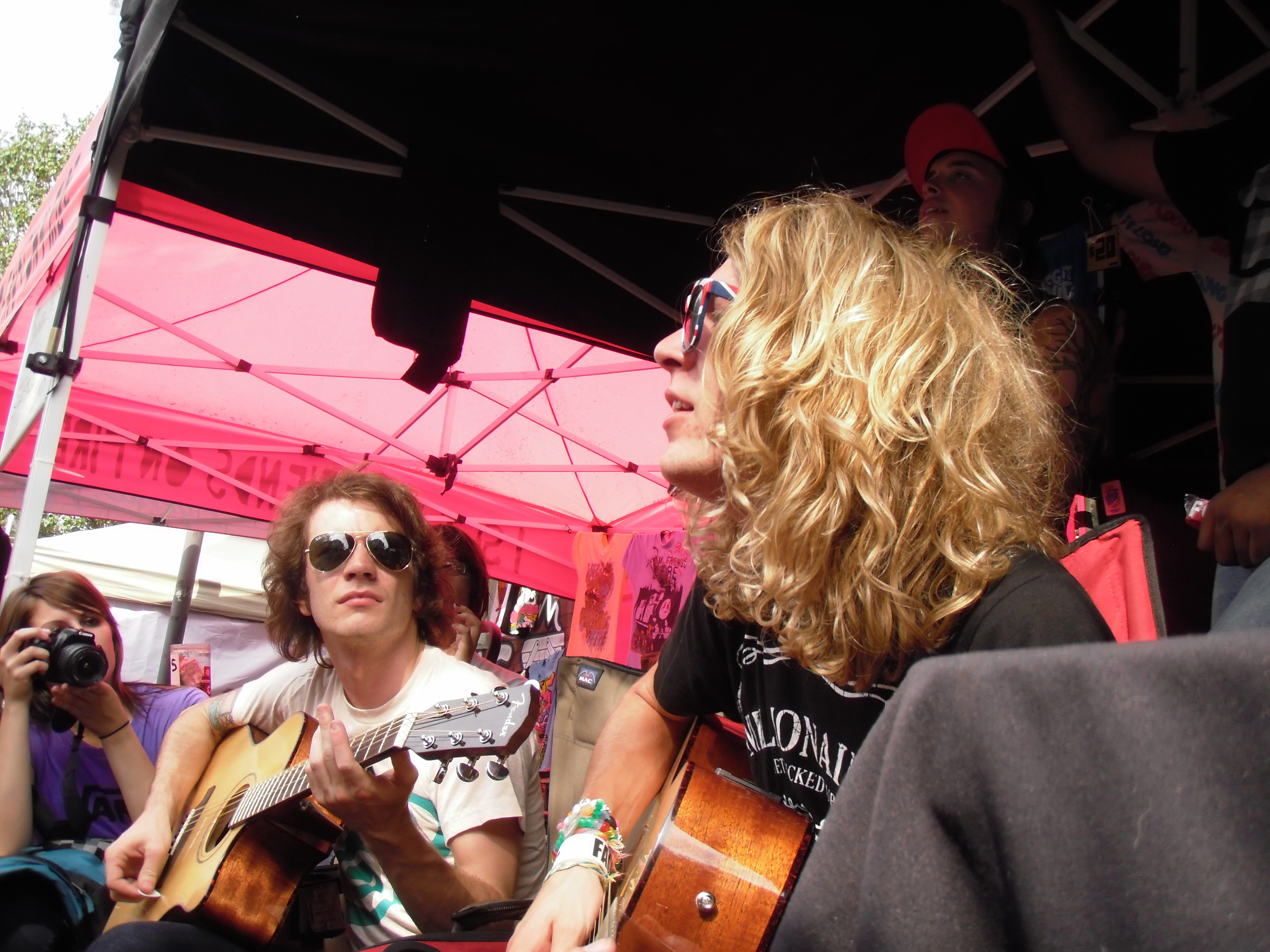
Sing It Loud playing acoustically at Warped Tour in Charlotte, NC in July 2009

Sing It Loud grew out of a friendship between cousins vocalist Pat Brown and guitarist Kieren Smith, who founded the group together and added members whom they met locally in the Minneapolis music scene. Brown officially brought the group together after his previous band, The Semester, called it quits. He was the former singer and guitarist for local legends The Semester. Frustrated with their lack of mainstream success, The Semester played one final show in the Minneapolis suburb Savage. Drummer Jason Grietens went on to spawn hardcore project Get Young.

Sing It Loud was offered a contract with Epitaph Records after playing only seven shows together. Their debut release for Epitaph was an EP produced by Josh Cain of Motion City Soundtrack, released in March 2008. The group then toured with We the Kings, This Providence, Ludo, The Morning Light, Valencia, Every Avenue, Hit the Lights, All Time Low, Farewell, Cobra Starship, Forever the Sickest Kids, Single File, Cash Cash, Motion City Soundtrack, and others. A full-length produced by Cain and mixed by Mark Trombino was released on Epitaph on September 23, 2008. The album features guest appearances from Justin Pierre of Motion City Soundtrack and Alex Gaskarth of All Time Low. Come Around hit No. 44 on the Billboard Heatseekers chart.

The band spent the summer of 2009 on Warped Tour 2009 on the Hurley Stage.

Pat Brown recently announced during a live acoustic performance online that Sing It Loud will be releasing their new album in May. Sing It Loud's upcoming album includes a track called "Shadows" that features lead vocals by Kieren Smith and backup vocals by Pat Brown. This will be the first time the two have ever switched roles.

In April 2010, the band supported Motion City Soundtrack on their headlining US tour. Their next album, Everything Collide, containing 11 tracks it came out May 11, 2010. The album reached No. 28 on the Billboard Heatseekers chart.

On September 14, 2010, after three years as a band, the members decided to go their separate ways. The split was announced via their MySpace page. Their final show was played on October 9, 2010 at Station 4 in their hometown.

== 2012 reunion show ==
The band played a reunion show on October 6, 2012 in Minneapolis. They were joined by Steve Salazar, The Role Call, Love Out Loud, and William Beckett.

== Band members ==
Final line-up

- Pat Brown - vocals, guitar
- Kieren Smith - guitar, backing vocals
- Nate Flynn - bass
- Ben Peterson - keyboard, synthesizer
- Christopher Lee - drums

Former members

- Dane Schmidt - Drums

== Discography ==
=== Studio albums ===
- Come Around (Epitaph Records, September 23, 2008)
- Everything Collide (Epitaph Records, May 11, 2010)

=== Extended plays ===
- Sing It Loud EP (Self-released, October 6, 2007)
- Come Around EP (Epitaph Records, March, 2008)
