= Justin Courtney Pierre =

American musician (born 1976)

Justin Pierre
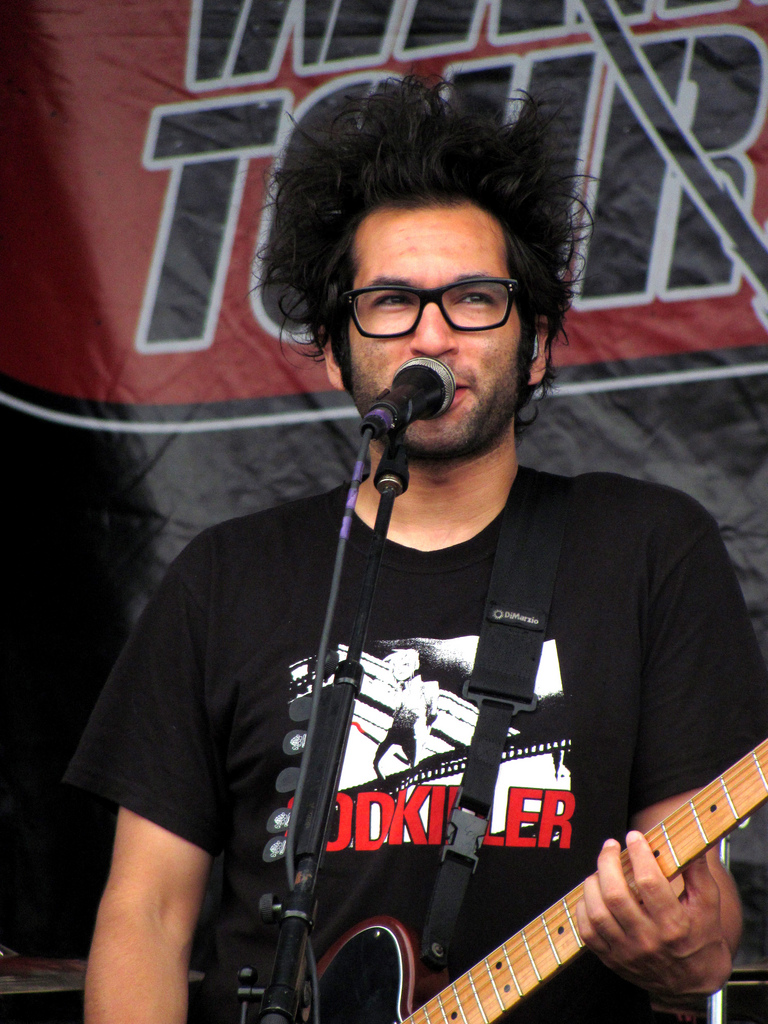
- Pierre performing at the 2010 Warped Tour

Background information
- Born: Justin Courtney Pierre; May 26, 1976 (age 50)
- Origin: Mahtomedi, Minnesota, U.S.
- Genres: Pop punk; indie rock; alternative rock; emo
- Occupation: Musician
- Instruments: Vocals; guitar
- Years active: 1995–present
- Labels: Epitaph; Columbia; The Boombox Generation; Modern Radio
- Member of: Motion City Soundtrack

Justin Courtney Pierre (born May 26, 1976) is an American singer, songwriter, and guitarist originally from Mahtomedi, Minnesota. He is the co-founder, lead vocalist and rhythm guitarist of the pop punk band Motion City Soundtrack. He has also produced short films.

== Early life ==
Justin Pierre was raised in Mahtomedi, Minnesota. During his childhood, he enjoyed skateboarding and listening to hip-hop such as Run-DMC and the Beastie Boys. As a teen, Pierre became a fan of alternative metal band Faith No More; in 1990, he regularly watched their You Fat Bastards videotape and the performance of frontman Mike Patton greatly influenced him. He would later mention the Faith No More album Angel Dust as one of his favorite records of all time.

Pierre studied at Mahtomedi High School, where he developed an interest in indie rock. During this time, Pierre became a fan of bands such as Sonic Youth, The Boo Radleys, and The Pixies. Pierre played guitar and sang in a band called Slide Coaster, who released an album in 1995 titled Thrown. The group eventually disbanded, leaving Pierre to focus more on his hobby of making short films. However, his friend Joshua Cain convinced him to continue making music and recruited Pierre to join his band, which would eventually become Motion City Soundtrack.

== Musical career ==
Justin Pierre formed Motion City Soundtrack in 1997 with friend Joshua Cain, becoming the lead singer as well as playing rhythm guitar. He and Cain both previously took stints on the moog synthesizer in the band, until the foundation of the current lineup. Pierre was the primary lyricist for the band, and visually became noted for his pronounced sideburns, wild hair and glasses (which are Kirk Originals).

Pierre has struggled with alcohol and substance abuse problems in the past, and during the recording of the album Commit This To Memory, he relapsed and binge drank due to the ending of a relationship. Pierre has asthma, having to use his inhaler on stage at times.

The band released its fourth album, My Dinosaur Life, on January 19, 2010. Pierre was "trucking along on The Dino Trail" to promote the album. He began his promotional tour in Chicago on November 1 and was making his way around the United States doing "meet ups, impromptu performances, in store appearances, and other shenanigans that will surely ensue along the way."

The band's 5th album, Go, was released on June 12, 2012. The band's sixth album, Panic Stations, was released on September 18, 2015.

== Film making ==
Pierre makes short films, went to Minneapolis Community and Technical College for film, but did not complete a degree. He now works on independent short films while at home, recording, and on tour. His film "Karen" was in a few film festivals early winter and spring 2007, including the 3rd annual Griffon International Film Festival (GIFF) and The Sacramento International Film Festival.

Pierre has been involved in the direction of music videos for fellow bands. He co-directed the music video for "Big Drag" by Limbeck, as well as co-directing with Shane Nelson the video for Sing It Loud's "No One Can Touch Us", which was produced by MCS' guitarist Joshua Cain.

== Other works ==
In addition to singing for Motion City Soundtrack, Justin has sung guest vocals on Fall Out Boy's "Chicago is So Two Years Ago", Small Towns Burn A Little Slower's "Alias: The Bookkeeper", Metro Station's "Kelsey", Sing It Loud's "We're Not Afraid", The Rocket's "Shadow" (which he co-wrote with Joshua Cain and The Rocket) and is thought to have been heard singing numerous times on the Limbeck album Hi, Everything's Great. He also sings and helped write a song with Michigan City band, Grown Ups, called Are You Kitten Me? and was featured in Revolution on Canvas, Volume 2: Poetry From the Indie Music Scene inputting a short story about the love and loss of a certain person in his life who was also addicted to alcohol. Pierre also produced two songs (along with Joshua Cain) on Metro Station's self-titled debut album.

Pierre joined actors Lance Henriksen, Bill Moseley, Danielle Harris and Tiffany Shepis, as well as AFI's Davey Havok and Battlestar Galactica's Nicki Clyne in the cast of the "illustrated film" series Godkiller. Pierre voiced the lead role of Tommy, a boy on a mission to save his dying sister in a post-nuclear wasteland.

Pierre is also in a band called Farewell Continental, whose first full-length album was released on May 10, 2011, followed by a United States tour.

Pierre and his wife, Lindsay Pierre, host a podcast called Book Narcs, in which the couple ask guests about their book history and interests.

In 2017, Pierre announced The Rapture Twins, a rock collaboration between himself and Game Informer Executive Editor Andrew Reiner. The band's lyrics and branding reflect themes from the world of video games (including Overblood and the BioShock series). Their first single, "Would You Kindly?," was released on February 14, 2017. It was followed by the group's second single, "Eternity," which was released during Game Informer's November 2017 Extra Life charity event, with all proceeds from the single's sale going to Gillette Children's Specialty Healthcare.

In 2021 he appeared in Eric Smith and Lauren Gibaldi's Young Adult anthology, Battle of the Bands, published with Candlewick Press. It was a Read Across America selection and a Bank Street Best Book pick.

== Equipment ==
Pierre plays a variety of Fender Telecasters from Fender Telecaster Deluxes, to Fender Telecaster Customs to American Fender Telecasters. He has also played a Gibson SG in the past.

== Discography ==
=== Solo ===
Albums

- In the Drink (2018)

Extended plays

- Open Mic At The Lo-Fi : Vol 1 (2019)
- An Anthropologist on Mars (2021)
- The Price of Salt (2021)
- Ghost World (2021)
- Permanent Midnight (2022)

=== with Motion City Soundtrack ===
- I Am the Movie (2003)
- Commit This to Memory (2005)
- Even If It Kills Me (2007)
- My Dinosaur Life (2010)
- Go (2012)
- Panic Stations (2015)
- The Same Old Wasted Wonderful World (2025)

=== with Farewell Continental ===
- ¡Hey, Hey Pioneers! (2011)

=== with Slide Coaster ===
- Thrown - EP (1995)
