= Golden Smog =

Alternative country-rock supergroup

- Origin: Minneapolis, Minnesota, U.S.
- Genres: Rock, alternative country, blues
- Years active: 1989–present
- Labels: Rykodisc; Lost Highway
- Members: Kraig Johnson; Dan Murphy; Gary Louris; Marc Perlman; Jeff Tweedy; Steve Gorman
- Past members: Dave Pirner; Chris Mars; Noah Levy; Jody Stephens

Golden Smog is an alternative country-rock supergroup of loosely connected musicians mostly from the Minneapolis-St. Paul area. At various times members of Soul Asylum, The Replacements, Wilco, The Jayhawks, Run Westy Run, The Honeydogs, and Big Star have worked with Golden Smog. Given the fluid collaborative nature of Golden Smog the lineup has often changed, but relative constant members who appear on all the recordings are guitarists Kraig Johnson (Run Westy Run), Dan Murphy (Soul Asylum), and Gary Louris (The Jayhawks) along with bassist Marc Perlman (The Jayhawks).

The group took their name from a nickname given to Fred Flintstone in The Flintstones episode "Hot Lips Hannigan", which, in turn, was a parody of singer Mel Tormé's nickname (The Velvet Fog).

== History ==
=== Pre-history: The Take It To The Limit Band (1987) and Her Satanic Majesty's Paycheck (1989) ===
The definitive beginning of Golden Smog is hard to pinpoint given the mercurial nature of the band's lineup. However, some claim that the group that would evolve into Golden Smog debuted in January 1987, when a band billed as "The Take It To The Limit Band" played an (almost) all-Eagles cover show at the Uptown Bar in Minneapolis. The band consisted of Dan Murphy and Dave Pirner (both of Soul Asylum), Jim Boquist (later of Son Volt), and Martin Zellar (Gear Daddies). The show ended with a cover of then Bangles hit song "Walk Like an Egyptian." That same group later played a Rolling Stones-themed show in 1989 under the band name "Her Satanic Majesty's Paycheck."

=== First incarnation (1989–1998) ===
The group first came together under the name "Golden Smog" in the Minneapolis-St. Paul area in 1989. The band was conceived as a country-rock reaction to the punk and hardcore music that dominated the Twin Cities' musical scene at the time. Eventually Golden Smog became something of a fixture at local clubs where they played a handful of shows annually, consisting almost entirely of cover songs.

Membership in the early days of the band was loose and fluid, but in 1992, Murphy and Pirner of Soul Asylum, Louris and Perlman of The Jayhawks, Johnson of Run Westy Run, and drummer Chris Mars (of The Replacements) released Golden Smog's first CD, a covers EP entitled On Golden Smog. All of the band members were credited under pseudonyms for this release as a result of contractual obligations to other record companies. Over the next few years, members of Golden Smog began adding original material to the group's repertoire, although cover songs would continue to be featured in concert and on record throughout their career.

In 1995, the group released its full-length debut, Down by the Old Mainstream (recorded at Pachyderm Recording Studio), consisting of mostly original songs, with a handful of covers. By this time, Mars had left Golden Smog and the band consisted of Johnson, Murphy, Louris, and Perlman, along with two new members: Wilco frontman Jeff Tweedy and Honeydogs drummer Noah Levy. As with the band's debut EP, all of the band members were credited under pseudonyms (which consisted of their middle names and the names of the streets where they grew up) as performers—although they all used their real names in the writing credits.

At a New Year's Eve show in 1996/97 Jody Stephens (of Big Star) took over for Noah on the drums, and subsequently became a full band member. Golden Smog then released their second full-length studio album Weird Tales in 1998, with all band members credited under their real names as both writers and performers.

=== Second incarnation (2005–2007) ===
After a period of inactivity, in 2005 a new incarnation of Golden Smog formed and recorded the Another Fine Day album in the village of El Puerto de Santa María, Spain produced by Paco Loco. At that point the band consisted of Johnson, Louris, Murphy and Perlman; guest performers on several tracks included Tweedy, Spanish female vocalist Muni Camón, drummers Linda Pitmon and Jody Stephens, and multi-instrumentalist Ed Ackerson.

In the summer of 2006, the Johnson/Louris/Murphy/Perlman version of Golden Smog undertook a concert tour, augmented by a touring keyboardist and drummer. This same line-up of the band then issued Blood on the Slacks in 2007; with no permanent drummer, various drummers filled the position on this disc, including Pitmon, Ackerson, Peter Anderson and even Marc Perlman.

=== Third incarnation (2019-present) ===
Golden Smog reunited on July 12, 2019, to play a small "surprise" performance celebrating Dan Murphy's 57th birthday. The show marked Murphy's first public musical performance since his retirement from Soul Asylum in 2012. Murphy was joined onstage by Johnson, Louris, and Perlman as well as Miles Zuniga of the band Fastball.

A performance was scheduled for April 4, 2020, at First Avenue in Minneapolis. However, the show was postponed due to COVID-19 concerns. The band reunited at First Avenue on April 2, 2022, with Tweedy and Stephens both rejoining the band.

From 2022 forward, the group has held an annual show at First Avenue, always occurring near the end of the year. In December 2022 and again in December 2023, the group (still consisting of Gary Louris, Kraig Johnson, Dan Murphy, and Marc Perlman) played a special holiday show. The 2022 gig was billed as an "Unplugged" show; the 2023 date featured guest drummer Steve Gorman. For their 2024 gig, held in November, Golden Smog was now billed as a quintet, with Gorman as an official member.

Jeff Tweedy rejoined the group, now a sextet, for their three-city tour of December 2025. Appearing outside of the Twin Cities for the first time in nearly two decades, Golden Smog played gigs in Jersey City, New York City, and Chicago.

== Discography ==
=== Albums ===
- Down by the Old Mainstream (1995)
- Weird Tales (1998)
- Another Fine Day (2006)
- Blood on the Slacks (2007)

=== Compilation albums ===
- Stay Golden, Smog: The Best of Golden Smog—The Rykodisc Years (2008)

=== EPs ===
- On Golden Smog (1992)

=== Compilation appearances ===
- "Shooting Star" (from On Golden Smog) on the Clerks soundtrack (1994)
- "Prison Wife" on Minnesota Modern Rock: The Pachyderm Sessions, (1995) (previously unreleased song)
- "Looking Forward to Seeing You" (from Weird Tales) on the Alt.Country Exposed Roots compilation (1999)
- "Looking Forward to Seeing You" (from Weird Tales) on the Rykodisc 20th Anniversary compilation (2004)
