= ¡Hey, Hey Pioneers! =

Studio album by Farewell Continental
- Released: May 10, 2011
- Recorded: August 19–22, 2009, March 10–14, 2010, July 19–22, 2010, and July 27–29, 2010
- Genre: Alternative rock
- Length: 38:50
- Label: Paper + Plastick
- Producers: Ed Ackerson & Farewell Continental

Farewell Continental chronology
EP#2 (2010)	¡Hey, Hey Pioneers! (2011)

Professional ratings
Review scores
Source	Rating
AbsolutePunk.net	(76%)
Alter The Press	4.5/5 stars

¡Hey, Hey Pioneers! is the first studio album by the American alternative rock band Farewell Continental, released on May 10, 2011, by Paper + Plastick.

== Track listing ==
No.	Title	Length
1.	"Seasoned Veterans"	2:06
2.	"Capybara"	2:54
3.	"Who's The Boss?"	1:48
4.	"The Greatest Of All Time (How You Feelin' Now?)"	2:50
5.	"Dagger, Dagger: Terror, Terror"	2:58
6.	"A Story From The Bottom Of The Sea"	2:26
7.	"Immolated"	3:45
8.	"New Tile Floor"	3:02
9.	"Radio, Radio: Are You Getting This?"	2:55
10.	"The Explorer Settles Down"	2:39
11.	"Mad Operator"	1:54
12.	"I Feel Everything (Can You Feel It As Well?)"	2:10
13.	"The Reflecting Skin"	4:03
14.	"Tiger Claw"	3:20

== Personnel ==
- Justin Pierre – vocals, guitar
- Kari Gray – vocals, keyboards
- Thomas Rehbein – guitar
- Jim Adolphson – bass guitar
- Josh McKay – drums
