= Rachael Cantu =

American singer-songwriter

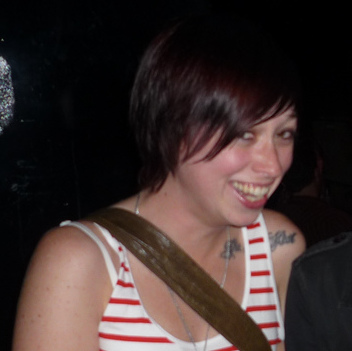
- Cantu in 2009
- Born: June 8, 1981 (age 44); Orange County, California, U.S.
- Occupations: Singer; songwriter
- Years active: 2004–present
- Spouse: Liz Feldman (m. 2013)
- Musical career
- Instrument: Vocals
- Years active: 1997–present

Rachael Cantu (born June 8, 1981) is an American singer-songwriter. She was born and grew up in Orange County, California. She currently lives in Los Angeles.

== Career ==
Cantu started her career fronting a southern Californian indie rock band called Quite Satellite while still in high school from 1997 through 2000, releasing a few singles with other local bands like Driving By Braille and Machine-Gun Kelly. She later wrote and performed as a solo artist in Los Angeles and San Diego, and opened for bands such as The Get Up Kids, Saves the Day and Karate. After moving to Boston, her reputation grew amongst fellow artists. Cantu opened for Canadian indie pop duo Tegan and Sara on two North American tours, and also for Limbeck and Ben Lee.

Cantu's first release was the EP Blood Laughs. After signing to Q Division Records, in 2006 she released her debut album Run All Night. The album has been well received by critics, and was successful in the independent album charts. Since then she has toured North America to promote the album.

Tegan Quin of Tegan and Sara appeared as a backing vocalist on Saturday, as well as Tony Goddess of Papas Fritas. Cantu has also recorded songs with Limbeck, Kori Gardner of Mates of State, and Jason Gnewikow of The Promise Ring.

Musically, Cantu has been described as "something of a mix of The Pretenders' Chrissie Hynde, PJ Harvey, Sarah McLachlan, and Norah Jones". She has also been compared vocally to Björk and Patty Griffin.

In January 2009, Cantu's song "Devil's Thunder" was featured on ABC's "Private Practice." In February 2009, Cantu's self-titled EP was released. In 2009 and 2010, she opened on various dates for blues legend B.B. King. In November 2009, she released her second studio album, Far and Wide, created with Vancouver-based producer Garth Futcher (best known for his work with Be Good Tanyas).

Her music has been widely celebrated by press including SPIN, Stereogum, Buzzfeed, Autostraddle and Rookie. Rachael's song "Make Our Own Way", by her studio project with Harlan Silverman, Little Brutes, was commissioned as the theme song for the NBC/Ellen Degeneres-produced sitcom, ‘One Big Happy’, with many of her songs have been featured on numerous TV shows including ‘Pretty Little Liars’, ‘Shameless’, ‘Private Practice’, ‘Royal Pains’ and ‘Degrassi’.

Rachael's third solo EP, Love Rush, was released Spring of 2018. The record is a lush, evocative collection of deeply personal songs about love and loss. Love Rush reflects a shift into pop territory, which, in part, was inspired by her volunteer work with the Songs For Kids Foundation, an organization that brings musicians into children's hospitals to sing popular music.

== Personal life ==
Rachael Cantu is lesbian and since 2013, she is married to the actress, comedian, writer, and producer Liz Feldman.

== Discography ==
=== Albums ===
- Split EP with Robb MacLean (Limbeck)
- Blood Laughs EP (2004)
- Run All Night (2006)
- Far and Wide (2009)
- Covers (2013)
- Little Brutes EP (2011)
- Little Brutes – Desire EP (2015)
- Love Rush EP (2018)

=== Compilations ===
- Sound Relief Volume One: From CA to NYC (2001) – "Best Wishes"
- Paupers, Peasants, Princes & Kings: The Songs of Bob Dylan (2006) – "I Threw It All Away"
- Terrible Thrills, Vol. 1 (2010) – "Soldier in the Army"
- Bother Me Tomorrow: An Indie Tribute to Creedence Clearwater Revival (2014) – "Proud Mary"
