= Limbeck =

American rock band

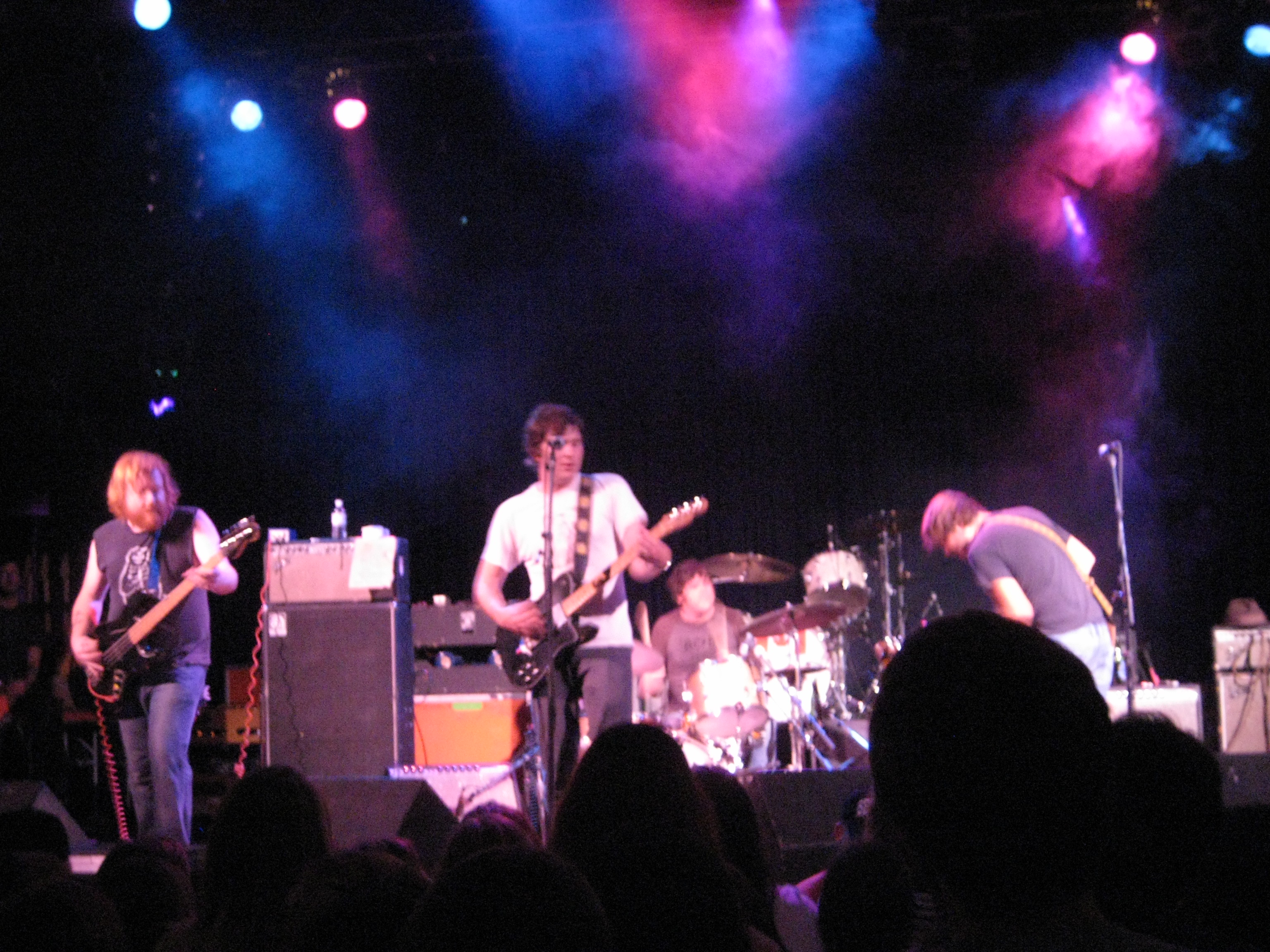
- Limbeck performing in 2007

Background information
- Origin: Southern California, United States
- Genres: Alternative country, Americana, pop punk
- Years active: 1999–present
- Labels: Doghouse, Utility, Bearhouse
- Members: Robb MacLean; Patrick Carrie; Justin Entsminger; Jon Phillip
- Past members: Matthew Stephens; Cy Scott; Tom Moser; Mike Seretan; David Del Fonzo "Spacey" Casey Prestwood; Marko Buzard; Joe Camerlengo
- Website: http://www.limbeck.net/

Limbeck is an American rock band that formed in Southern California, in 1999. The group featured Robb MacLean on lead vocals and guitar, Patrick Carrie guitar and backing vocals, Justin Entsminger on bass, and Jon Phillip, who replaced Matthew Stephens on drums in 2005. Their sound was a mix of alternative country with pop punk origins.

Their debut album, This Chapter Is Called Titles, was released in 2000. Their sound had shifted by the release of Hi, Everything's Great in 2003 to showcase a more country-indebted sound. The group toured heavily, often supporting or touring alongside bands such as Motion City Soundtrack and the All-American Rejects. Their third album, Let Me Come Home saw release in 2005, and the band issued their final, self-titled release in 2007. Though the band largely ceased touring and recording by 2010, they have continued to reunite for several shows and mini-tours.

== Background ==
The band's name comes from the (misspelled) name of a character on the television show Charles in Charge, Buddy Lembeck. The group claimed to be influenced by Fleetwood Mac, Wilco, The Beach Boys, Tom Petty, Ryan Adams, Beck, ELO, Big Star, Queen, The Replacements, The Beatles, Old 97's and The Flying Burrito Brothers.

While classified as indie rock due to their relatively small niche in Southern California, the band's musical style has also been described as alternative country music. Their style has been likened to that of Old 97's, Ryan Adams, and Teenage Fanclub. Their original sound was very power pop and emo inspired, as heard in their early releases, including This Chapter Is Called Titles. Slowly, the band became more and more alt. country influenced and changed their sound almost entirely with their release of Hi, Everything's Great. By the end of their time as a band, Limbeck had all but abandoned their early songs, rarely playing this material live, if ever.

The band titled the 2005 album Let Me Come Home in part as a reaction to critics frequently saying that the previous album, Hi, Everything's Great, was a "road-trip album".

The band has discussed the influence of their lengthy tours upon their music. Limbeck has toured the US several times, including as opening act for The All-American Rejects in 2003. They also opened for the band during their UK tour in 2004 together with Motion City Soundtrack. Geography plays a role in the band's recordings: several songs name interstate highways known to Orange County and San Diego County residents, such as I-8, CA-22, and I-15.

In 2000, the band was featured in an iMac commercial. The commercial featured the iMac video editing software in which the band created a music video under the name Garage Monkeys.

The band never officially broke up, though each of the members have since moved on to other projects: Carrie & MacLean are still in Southern California, where they've started a new group called The Young Dudes; Entsminger is playing bass for Source Victoria in Phoenix, Arizona; and Jon Phillip relocated to Milwaukee, Wisconsin, where he started a record label called Good Land Records, but moved to Nashville, TN in 2015. In 2011, Jonny joined Milwaukee, WI band Trapper Schoepp & The Shades, but left the band in late 2014. JP is currently attending school to become a substance abuse counselor, does studio recording, and plays drums for Josh Berwanger of the Anniversary.

In December 2012, Limbeck reunited for the "Holidaze with Limbeck" tour. The tour included three shows in California and a show in Phoenix, Arizona. Reubens Accomplice and Trapper Schoepp and The Shades opened the shows. On March 4, 2016, Limbeck played Phoenix, AZ at the Rebel Lounge to celebrate 15 years of doing shows with Psyko Steve. In September 2016, Limbeck played 5 shows out west with their past tour buddies Piebald. The tour brought them to San Francisco, Anaheim, Los Angeles, San Diego, and Phoenix.

On Oct 9, 2017, Doghouse Records announced that Limbeck's 2007 album Limbeck, will be reissued by the end of the year, to celebrate its 10-year anniversary. The album will come out on LP and digital format, and will feature updated artwork by Jesse LeDoux, a full remaster, and contain demos and b-sides from that era.

== Legacy ==
Limbeck's pioneering mix of alt-country and emo proved influential on a host of musicians, even if it did not equate to mainstream success. Chris Carrabba of Dashboard Confessional has suggested "Limbeck's legacy can be heard clearly in bands like the Gaslight Anthem, the Menzingers, the Front Bottoms and in garage-fueled anthems from far and wide." Matty Healy of British group the 1975 has remarked that he "loved" Limbeck, mentioning them as an influence on the song "Roadkill" from their 2020 album Notes on a Conditional Form.

== Discography ==
=== Studio albums ===
- This Chapter Is Called Titles (2000)
- Hi, Everything's Great (2003)
- Let Me Come Home (2005)
- Limbeck (2007)

=== EPs ===
- The Skiball Champs EP (1999)
- Connection EP (2000)
- Tour Support EP (2003)
- Limbeck/Motion City Soundtrack 7" Split (2004)
- Tour EP (2006)

=== Live ===
- Hey, Everything's Fine. (2004)
- The Delicacy of Living Modestly (2008)

=== Singles ===
- "Julia"
- "People Don't Change"
- "The State" - iTunes exclusive digital single
- "Big Drag" (2007), Doghouse - b/w "Home (Is Where the Van Is)", "Let's Talk About the Weather"
- "Let Me Come Home" (2008)

=== Compilations ===
- A Tribute to Tom Petty: Pacific Ridge Record's Heroes of Classic Rock - "The Apartment Song"
- Sound Relief Volume One: From CA to NYC - "Why Don't You Just Leave Already? (Dance Remix)"
- We're Not Generation X (out of print)
- Sound Relief Volume One: From CA to NYC - "Why Don't You Just Leave Already? (Dance Remix)"
- Doghouse 100 - "Don't Turn Around, She's Not Worth It"
- ¡Policia! - A Tribute to the Police - "So Lonely"
- Paupers, Peasants, Princes & Kings: The Songs of Bob Dylan - "Tonight, I'll Be Staying Here With You"
