= Trapper Schoepp =

American singer-songwriter

- Born: Red Wing, Minnesota, United States
- Origin: Milwaukee, Wisconsin, United States
- Genres: Rock, Americana
- Years active: 2007–present
- Labels: Grand Phony; Xtra Mile Recordings; SideOneDummy; Good Land
- Website: http://www.trapperschoepp.com/

Trapper Schoepp is an American singer-songwriter based in Milwaukee, Wisconsin.

After releasing two albums in his teens, Schoepp signed with SideOneDummy Records and released Run, Engine, Run (2012) as Trapper Schoepp & the Shades. In 2016, he signed with Xtra Mile Recordings and has released four albums under his own name: Rangers & Valentines (2016), Bay Beach Amusement Park (2017), and Primetime Illusion (2019). He later signed with Grand Phony Records to release May Day (2021).

== Early life ==
Trapper Schoepp was born in Red Wing, Minnesota and grew up in the nearby town of Ellsworth, Wisconsin. Tanner Schoepp co-writes and tours alongside his brother. After a back injury from BMX bike riding, his mother signed him up for guitar lessons as a "safer hobby". While recovering from the injury, he heard Bob Dylan's song "Hurricane" in the movie of the same name which inspired him to become a musician: "That first A minor chord got my blood pumping. Hearing the conviction in his voice as he told the story of an innocent man wrongly accused was life-changing".

== Musical career ==
=== 2007–2015: Early work ===
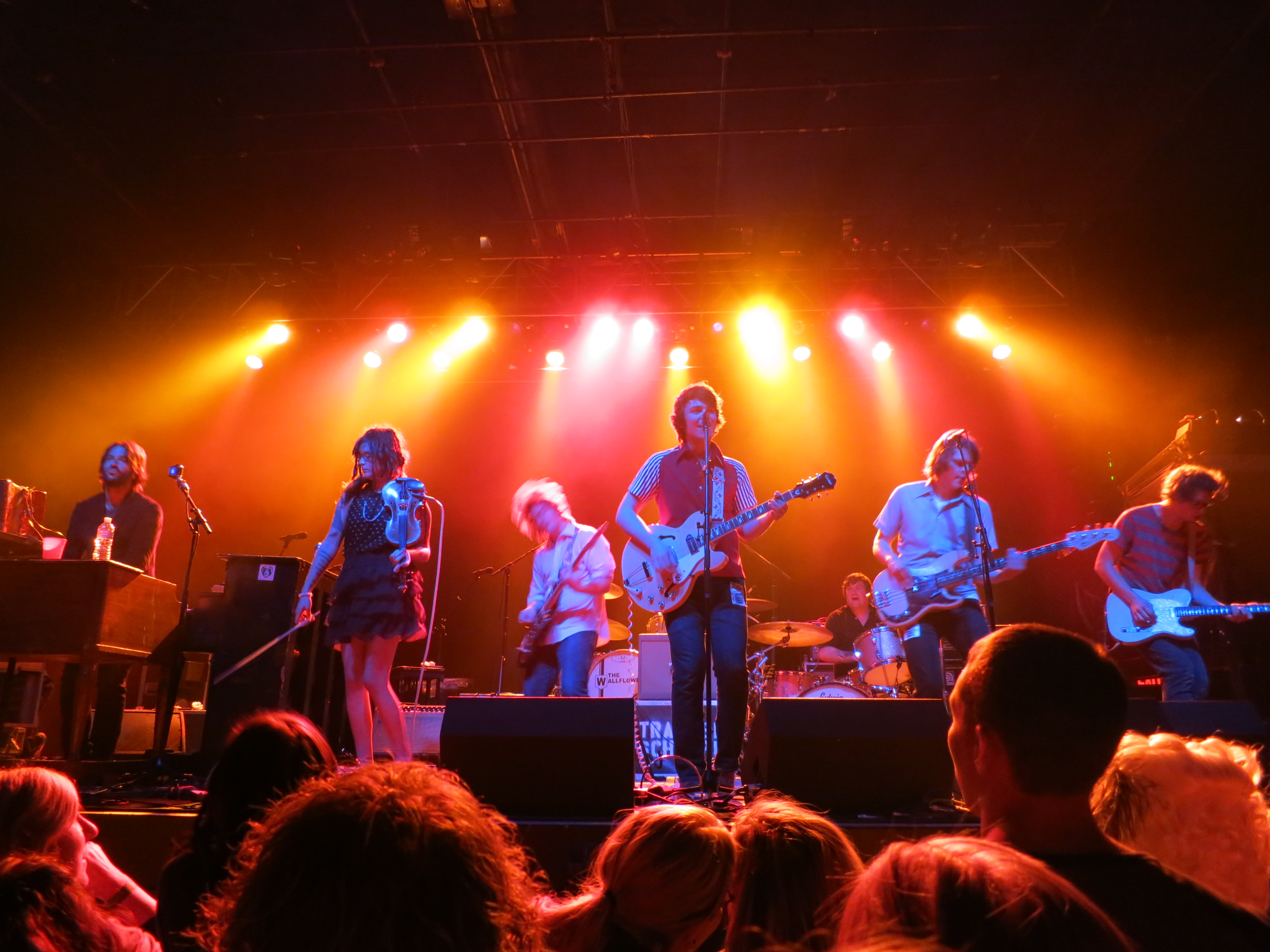
Trapper Schoepp & the Shades opening for The Wallflowers at the Mainroom of First Avenue in Minneapolis, Minnesota, 2012

At age 17, he started a band called The Trapper Schoepp Band with his brother, Tanner Schoepp (bassist) and local friends, while attending Ellsworth High School. The Trapper Schoepp Band released an early debut album called A Change in the Weather (2007) before the Schoepp brothers moved to Milwaukee, Wisconsin for college.

At age 19 he started a new band with his brother called Trapper Schoepp & the Shades, while attending the University of Wisconsin–Milwaukee (UWM) and released Lived and Moved (2009), which refers to his move from his small town to Milwaukee: "I really wanted to get out of that small town, but I think that everyone who goes through that transitional phase feels a little lost. You have all this ambition, but you're really clueless and you don't know what to do with it. There's this uncertainty. So for me, recording this record was definitely a way to deal with those adolescent blues that I think everyone experiences around this age".

Schoepp graduated from UWM with a degree in journalism focusing on radio broadcasting and obtained a Certificate in Rock-and-Roll while studying under the late Dr. Martin Jack Rosenblum, who was a music history and literature professor at the University.

Trapper Schoepp & the Shades signed a record deal with SideOneDummy Records and released their national debut Run, Engine, Run in September 2012. Rolling Stone premiered the album's title track on September 20, 2012. The song, a tribute to the Schoepps' grandfather and his 1964 Mercedes-Benz, was also featured on Car Talk's Whad'Ya Know?. The band toured on a 25-stop with The Wallflowers and also alongside Old 97's, The Jayhawks, Soul Asylum, Tommy Stinson, Social Distortion, The Reverend Peyton's Big Damn Band, Frank Turner, Cory Chisel and The Wandering Sons.

=== 2016–2019: Rangers and Valentines, Bay Beach Amusement Park and Primetime Illusion ===
Schoepp signed to Xtra Mile Recordings and released his second album, Rangers and Valentines on April 1, 2016. The album's name, along with the featured track "Dream", paid tribute to Geo Valentine and Schoepp's former professor Dr. Martin Jack Rosenblum (stage name Holy Ranger), both of whom were influential in developing his music education. The music video for the song "Settlin' or Sleepin' Around" features Richard Riehle and was shown at the 2016 Milwaukee Film Festival.

In 2017, Schoepp released Bay Beach Amusement Park, a six-song concept album based on the rides at the amusement park of the same name in Green Bay, Wisconsin. "Each song takes the listener on a different ride. I had this idea for years but it took me years to piece together how I wanted the songs to flow and what rides I wanted to sing about... It was pretty funny, the whole process, because when I started telling my band about it, they thought I was a crazy person until I had all the demos of the songs. It kind of started as an inside joke and the whole idea kind of exploded". The album was recorded in Pachyderm Studio in Cannon Falls, Minnesota. The album is inspired by the sounds of Little Richard, Chuck Berry, and Elvis Presley as an ode to the retro rides at the park, including the Zippin Pippin, Presley's favorite rollercoaster. The band commemorated the album with a performance celebrating the 125th anniversary of the amusement park, as well as nationwide tours with Ha Ha Tonka and BoDeans. "The Scat" became the theme song for the Onion's inaugural podcast “A Very Fatal Murder."

In 2018, Schoepp wrote music and additional lyrics to the unfinished Bob Dylan song "On, Wisconsin", originally written in 1961. Sharing a co-writing credit with Dylan, Schoepp recorded the song at Wauwatosa's Wire & Vice studio for his 2019 album Primetime Illusion. The album was produced by Patrick Sansone of Wilco and released on January 25, 2019. The songs for the album came at a time when Schoepp "was at a personal rock bottom. I had re-herniated a disk in my back that I had surgery on a few years prior. My longtime partner and I had just split and my creative well was just running dry". Two weeks prior to the release of Primetime Illusion, Schoepp released his single "What You Do to Her" featuring Nicole Atkins. The song is the story of someone who gets away with sexual assault, and how everyone is affected by the crime. According to Schoepp: "We're all affected by this–not only the victims, but their families, their friends, and the community as a whole. For too long men have stood on the sidelines and allowed this to become primarily a women's issue. I think everyone has an obligation to call out behavior like this. It's one thing to show solidarity behind the scenes but we need to be more vocal as men". He joined Rape, Abuse & Incest National Network's National Leadership Council as an advocate in supporting survivors of sexual violence and bringing their perpetrators to justice.

=== 2020–present: May Day ===
After the cancellation of his European tour due to the COVID-19 pandemic, Schoepp returned to the studio and recorded May Day, which was released May 21, 2021 on Grand Phony records. The additional downtime due to the pandemic also meant he could finetune his piano skills, which were featured for the first time on this album. The album title comes from the pagan origins of May Day, with Schoepp explaining, "On May Day, I use the natural world as a motif because I feel a strong connection to it. Nature is something real that I can feel, see, smell and touch, and it's a place where I've found comfort in these times...The pandemic devastated the live music industry but the need to be transported through song remained. I hope May Day offers that sort of escape". Tom Lanham of the San Francisco Examiner referred to the album as among the best of 2021. Writing for Rock Cellar magazine, Jeff Slate referred May Day as "a remarkable new album...Classic-sounding, old school pop songs that pack a bigger punch than just about anything currently on the charts".

Siren Songs was release April 21, 2023 (Grand Phony Records).

== Discography ==
=== Studio albums ===
- Run, Engine, Run (2011 - Good Land Records/2012 - SideOneDummy Records reissue, released as Trapper Schoepp & the Shades)
- Rangers & Valentines (2016 - Xtra Mile Recordings)
- Bay Beach Amusement Park (album) (2017 - Xtra Mile Recordings)
- Primetime Illusion (2019 - Xtra Mile Recordings)
- May Day (2021 - Grand Phony Records)
- Siren Songs (2023 - Grand Phony Records)

=== Compilations ===
- American Songwriter July 2012 Sampler - "So Long"
- Good Land Records Summer 2012 Sampler - "Pins and Needles"
