= My Dinosaur Life =

Studio album by Motion City Soundtrack
- Released: January 19, 2010
- Recorded: Various: April–June 2009; Opra Music Studios (North Hollywood, California); East West Studios (Hollywood, California); Flowers Studio (Minneapolis, Minnesota)
- Genres: Emo; pop punk; power pop
- Length: 39:56
- Label: Columbia
- Producer: Mark Hoppus

Motion City Soundtrack chronology
Even If It Kills Me (2007)	My Dinosaur Life (2010)	Go (2012)

Singles from My Dinosaur Life
- 1. "Disappear" Released: October 19, 2009; 2. "Her Words Destroyed My Planet" Released: December 1, 2009; 3. "A Lifeless Ordinary (Need a Little Help)" Released: November 11, 2010

My Dinosaur Life is the fourth studio album by the American rock band Motion City Soundtrack. Produced by Mark Hoppus, the album was released on January 19, 2010 by Columbia Records. After many years on independent label Epitaph Records, Motion City Soundtrack signed to major label Columbia in 2006, prior to the release of their third album, Even If It Kills Me (2007). Blink-182 bassist Mark Hoppus returned to produce the album; he had previously worked with the band on their 2005 breakthrough Commit This to Memory.

The album was largely recorded at Opra Music Studios in North Hollywood, California. The album's themes largely center on growing older; its lyricism, written by Pierre, concerns such subjects as relationships, drug abuse, and procrastination. Musically, the album retains the band's sound with less of an emphasis on the Moog synthesizer. Drummer Tony Thaxton broke his arm prior to recording, which led the band to use a drum machine on early recordings.

Their only major-label release, My Dinosaur Life was well received by music critics. The album represented their highest peak position in the U.S., charting at number fifteen on the Billboard 200. In support of the album, the group toured worldwide, making appearances in the U.S., the United Kingdom, Australia, and Japan.

== Recording and production ==
After releasing three records on the independent Epitaph label, Motion City Soundtrack signed a multiple-album deal with Columbia Records in late 2006, months before releasing their previous album Even If It Kills Me. Following the move, the guitarist Joshua Cain said, "It just felt right to make the move when there was the right interest there." With the new signing, the band's promotional team aimed to develop a balance between the benefits of a new major label and their previous grass-roots approach.

The album was produced by the Blink-182 frontman Mark Hoppus, who also worked with the band for their second album, Commit This to Memory. Hoppus said that the band wanted to follow in the tracks of Commit This to Memory, but to push things further. He said the album would incorporate a heavier, more experimental side of the group. "There's an edge on this record that I'm really excited about getting into," he said, "But it still has all the catchiness of everything that I personally love about Motion City Soundtrack. As a fan, it's really exciting to get to work with them again and help them flesh out this new vision of themselves." Pierre later recalled that the atmosphere in the studio was more loose than their first time working with Hoppus.

The band announced that they were to begin recording sessions with Hoppus in April 2009. Due to drummer Tony Thaxton's broken arm, the band were forced to rearrange the sequence in which they recorded. The drums were replaced by electronic beats and drum machines until Thaxton was able to play properly in the last week of recording. It was confirmed that recording had been completed on June 28, 2009.

== Music and lyrics ==
The band picked the title My Dinosaur Life after a quote Pierre kept repeating—they felt it a nice representation of the album's themes, which include growing old and feeling out of place. The album title was derived from frontman Justin Pierre misquoting a line ("My dragon life") from the 2008 film American Teen. The album's music is inspired by post-hardcore music; Pierre cited Archers of Loaf, Fugazi, and Dinosaur Jr. as inspirations for the album's sound. "Worker Bee" was chosen to open the album due to its short, energetic, "to-the-point" tone. Pierre created the song on his own at home, later bringing the completed music to the band. "A Life Less Ordinary (Need A Little Help)" came about early in the writing process. Pierre wrote the song quickly as the group had an opportunity to record it with producer John Fields, though they would eventually re-record it with Hoppus. Pierre took the title from the film A Life Less Ordinary, though it has "nothing to do with that film"; he interpreted it as wishing for a more rigid, "normal" life as opposed to self-destructive behavior.

"Her Words Destroyed My Planet" was one of the last songs recorded for the album; the band regarded it a signature track from the album, in the vein of past singles "Everything Is Alright". Pierre deemed it the most "honest" song he had written to that point. "Disappear" was a favorite of the band for its darker, more aggressive quality. "Delirium" came together in the first writing session. Bassist Matthew Taylor felt its lyrics regarded someone getting treatment for addiction and "taking initiative" to get past their burdens. "History Lesson" was likened to a rowdy, "Irish drinking song" by the band; they felt it evocative of a protagonist looking back fondly on his more youthful, "wilder days." It is the only song on the album produced by Ed Ackerson, who recorded a "re-worked" version of it with the band after sessions for the album were complete.

"Stand Too Close" was an autobiographical take on Pierre's relationship history. They considered it unconventional in its lack of a traditional chorus; likewise, drummer Tony Thaxton employed different instruments in its percussion, such as triangles and concert bass drums. "@!#?@!" was largely Pierre's creation; the rest of the band were initially unreceptive to it. He wrote it as a type of tongue-in-cheek "nerd's anthem". The title is a reference to the video game Q*bert and the main character's comic swear speech bubble. The band considered "Hysteria" a more eccentric song; it was nearly cut from the album's final track listing. "Skin and Bones" concerns questioning one's place in life and existence. It was a favorite of Pierre's, who regarded it as both depressing and beautiful. Hoppus joked after he recorded his vocal track that the band "writes some pretty uplifting songs." The album's final song, "The Weakends", is dark in tone but ends on a hopeful note. Pierre dubbed it a "procrastination anthem."

== Promotion and release ==
Whilst on tour with Blink-182, Motion City Soundtrack did an interview for MTV with Hoppus, in which it was revealed that the band's fourth album would be titled My Dinosaur Life.

Throughout November 2009, Pierre undertook a promotional tour called On the Dino Trail. Along with the band's tour manager and a friend, Pierre made appearances and played acoustic shows throughout the US Midwest and East Coast. The tour's itinerary was planned with fans' help through Twitter, with it all being chronicled online at MyDinosaurLife.com. The guitarist Joshua Cain commented that he felt their use of Twitter had helped to reconnect the band with fans. "I feel like in the last few years, that stuff's gotten harder to do... [Twitter has] really re-engaged us as a band to be able to communicate with everybody." The band played three sold-out Chicago shows in mid-December, each of which featured one of the band's previous records in full. They then arranged a touring schedule which would include supporting Weezer on several dates in December and January, as well as beginning a headlining tour in late January covering the United States. Following the album's release, they recommenced touring; in the first three months the band travelled to Australia for the national Soundwave festival, as well as to Japan and the United Kingdom.

On November 3, 2009, My Dinosaur Life was announced to have a release date of January 19, 2010. Pre-orders for the album went on sale through the band's official website on November 13, 2009. The pre-orders came in three varieties: digital, standard and deluxe edition. The physical form of the deluxe edition has five bonus tracks, a hard-bound book with six 7-inch picture discs, a signed Pulp Fiction—style lyric booklet and album artwork for each song by Joe Ledbetter. The digital deluxe edition includes the bonus tracks and the artwork in PDF form.

In October 2009, the band released the first song from the album, "Disappear", as a free download on their website, with a music video online for the song on November 19, 2009. "Her Words Destroyed My Planet" was first publicly released in November 2009 on Spin's website for streaming; the song was one of the site's most popular streams in 2009. Becoming the album's first single, "Her Words" was serviced to modern rock radio in December 2009, before having a music video released on January 11, 2010. A third song, "A Lifeless Ordinary (Need a Little Help)", was also released on Spin before the album.

In January 2010, the band undertook a series of song by song video testimonials for each of the album's tracks. The clips were released on numerous music websites including AbsolutePunk, Spin, Buzznet, Purevolume, Alternative Press, Punknews.org, Alloy.com, The Minneapolis Star Tribune, The A.V. Club, Ultimate Guitar Archive, Buzzgrinder.com and Twitvid. The album was uploaded for streaming on the band's MySpace on January 12, 2010.

== Reception ==
Professional ratings
Review scores
Source	Rating
Allmusic	4/5 stars
Alternative Press	5/5 stars
The A.V. Club	(B+)
Entertainment Weekly	(A−)
Idobi	4.5/5 stars
Lincoln Journal Star	(B−)
Punknews.org	4/5 stars
Slant	3/5 stars
Spin	3.5/5 stars
The Washington Post	(favorable)

My Dinosaur Life was a critical success. At Metacritic, which assigns a normalized rating out of 100 to reviews from critics, the album received a score of 79 from thirteen reviews.

Scott Heisel of Alternative Press was effusive, writing "Motion City Soundtrack have made the best album of their career [...] the album is aggressive, dense and complex, yet still retains a strong sense of melody and never takes itself too seriously." Entertainment Weekly writer Andy Greenwald praised the album's "soaring choruses," dubbing it a "winning fourth album." Mikael Wood, in a pre-release review for Spin, felt the record "strikes a radio-ready balance between mayhem and melody." The Washington Post's Allison Stewart called the album "scruffy, peppy, [and] hopelessly likable" that evokes "punk-pop's halcyon." The A.V. Club critic Kyle Ryan felt it "another in a series of impeccably constructed pop albums" by the group, noting, "There isn’t a dud among the album’s 12 tracks, and more than a few have a catchiness that borders on oppressive." A reviewer for Revolver felt "the real standouts on the band's fourth full-length are the grittier, unexpected moments."

Lincoln Journal Star journalist L. Kent Wolgamott stated that "My Dinosaur Life is full of complaints and clever cultural observations, insecurities and determination to move forward, a heap of modern confusion that is bound together by the catchy if repetitive music". A reviewer-Billboard opined that "Motion City Soundtrack's smart-aleck tendencies combine nicely with a harder sound on "My Dinosaur Life," pushing the band back to its roots with enough twist to propel it in a new direction." Matthew Cole of Slant Magazine felt the album best in small doses, praising what he felt were highlights and commenting, "With any luck, the band’s big-studio backing will find those winning tunes a home on the radio, as power-pop this well crafted surely deserves a little Top 40 success." PopMatters' Jennifer Cooke considered the album's darkness is what "keeps Motion City Soundtrack interesting and worthy of more serious consideration than other bands of its ilk."

=== Accolades ===
Publication	Country	Accolade	Year	Rank
Kerrang!	United Kingdom	51 Greatest Pop Punk Albums Ever	2015	18

* denotes an unordered list

== Track listing ==
All lyrics written by Justin Pierre; all music composed by Motion City Soundtrack.

1. "Worker Bee" – 2:25
2. "A Lifeless Ordinary (Need a Little Help)" – 3:23
3. "Her Words Destroyed My Planet" – 3:38
4. "Disappear" – 3:12
5. "Delirium" – 3:28
6. "History Lesson" – 2:35
7. "Stand Too Close" – 2:48
8. "Pulp Fiction" – 3:53
9. "@!#?@!" – 2:59
10. "Hysteria" – 3:05
11. "Skin and Bones" – 3:36
12. "The Weakends" – 4:48

=== Bonus tracks ===
iTunes pre-order/Japanese bonus track

13. "Sunny Day" – 3:10

Deluxe edition bonus disc

1. "A Life Less Ordinary (Need a Little Help)" (alternate version) – 3:20
2. "Pulp Fiction" (alternate version) – 3:23
3. "So Long Farewell" – 3:07
4. "Worker Bee" (alternate version) – 2:36
5. "Disappear" (alternate version) – 4:07

== Personnel ==
Credits adapted from the My Dinosaur Life liner notes.

Motion City Soundtrack

- Justin Pierre – lead vocals, rhythm guitar
- Joshua Cain – lead guitar, backing vocals
- Jesse Johnson – Moog synthesizer, keyboard
- Matthew Taylor – bass guitar, backing vocals, keyboards
- Tony Thaxton – drums, percussion, backing vocals

Additional musicians

- Kieren Smith – violin, backing vocals on "History Lesson"
- Claudio Rivera – backing vocals on "@!#?@!"

Production

- Mark Hoppus – producer
- Chris Holmes – co-producer, recording engineer
- Jordan Schmidt – recording engineer
- Robbes Stieglitz – assistant engineer
- Ed Ackerson – producer and recording engineer on "History Lesson"
- Peter Anderson – assistant engineer on "History Lesson"
- Joe Ledbetter – artwork
- Andy Wallace – mixing engineer
- Ted Jensen – mastering engineer

== Charts ==
Chart performance
Chart (2010)	Peak position
Australian Albums (ARIA)	50
Canadian Albums (Nielsen SoundScan)	48
UK Albums (Official Charts)	191
US Billboard 200	15
US Indie Store Album Sales (Billboard)	3
US Top Alternative Albums (Billboard)	3
US Top Rock Albums (Billboard)	3
