= Teles =

Teles may refer to:

== People ==
- Teles of Megara, (fl. c. 235 BC), Cynic philosopher and teacher
- Teles (mythology), mythological son of Heracles
- Teles (surname)
- Vitali Teleš (born 1983), Estonian footballer

== Other uses ==
- Teles River, a river in Perm Krai, Russia
- TELES, a German company

== See also ==
- Teles Pires, river in Brazil
- Tele (disambiguation)
