= Disappear (Motion City Soundtrack song) =

Single by Motion City Soundtrack

from the album My Dinosaur Life
- Released: October 19, 2009
- Recorded: April–June 2009; Opra Music Studios (Los Angeles, California)
- Genre: Emo, pop punk, indie rock
- Length: 3:13
- Label: Columbia
- Songwriters: Joshua Cain, Jesse Johnson, Matthew Taylor, Tony Thaxton, Justin Pierre
- Producer: Mark Hoppus

Motion City Soundtrack singles chronology
| "Fell in Love Without You" (2008) | "Disappear" (2009) | "Her Words Destroyed My Planet" (2009) |

"Disappear" is a song by American rock band Motion City Soundtrack, released on October 19, 2009 as the lead single from the group's fourth studio album, My Dinosaur Life (2010). The song's music video was released on November 19, 2009.

== Background ==
"Disappear" was considered by frontman Justin Pierre to be the darkest on the album, trying to capture a "crazy energy" that he felt he lacked on the band's previous effort, Even If It Kills Me (2007). Much of the group too considered it a more "evil, […] progressive" cut. The song, like album track "Delirium", drop Jesse Johnson's keyboards from the band's sound.

== Release and reception ==
In October 2009, the band released the song as a free download on their website, with a music video online for the song on November 19, 2009.

Alternative Press considered it "dark, swirling second-wave emo recalling the best the mid-to-late '90s underground had to offer."

== Personnel ==
Motion City Soundtrack

- Justin Pierre – lead vocals, guitar
- Joshua Cain – guitar, vocals
- Jesse Johnson – Moog, keyboard
- Matt Taylor – bass guitar, percussion
- Tony Thaxton – drums

Production

- Mark Hoppus – producer
