= Her Words Destroyed My Planet =

Single by Motion City Soundtrack

from the album My Dinosaur Life
- Released: December 1, 2009
- Recorded: April–June 2009; Opra Music Studios (Los Angeles, California)
- Genre: Emo, pop punk, indie rock
- Length: 3:39
- Label: Columbia
- Songwriter(s): Joshua Cain, Jesse Johnson, Matthew Taylor, Tony Thaxton, Justin Pierre
- Producer(s): Mark Hoppus

Motion City Soundtrack singles chronology
"Disappear" (2009)	"Her Words Destroyed My Planet" (2009)	"A Lifeless Ordinary (Need A Little Help)" (2010)

"Her Words Destroyed My Planet" is a song by American rock band Motion City Soundtrack, released on December 1, 2009, as the second single from the group's fourth studio album, My Dinosaur Life (2010). The song's music video was released on January 7, 2010.

== Background ==
"Her Words Destroyed My Planet" came fairly late in the recording process, after the band had nearly the full album recorded. The song follows past singles such as "The Future Freaks Me Out" and "Everything Is Alright" with quirky, pop culture-referencing lyrics masking personal introspection. Pierre considered it the most honest song written for My Dinosaur Life. "I think this is kinda the quintessential Motion City Soundtrack song," said producer Mark Hoppus. In keeping with the pop culture theme of the song, the music video was filmed at the Hollywood United Methodist Church where many films have been filmed, including the Enchantment Under The Sea dance from Back To The Future.

== Reception ==
"Her Words Destroyed My Planet" was first publicly released in November 2009 on Spin's website for streaming; the song was one of the site's most popular streams in 2009. The song was serviced to modern rock radio on January 26, 2010. Alternative Press considered the song the album's finest, calling it "an emotionally devastating track about an attempt to win back a former lover that could be the psychic sequel to Weezer's 'Across the Sea'."

== Format and track listing ==
US CD (2010)

1. "Her Words Destroyed My Planet" (Radio Edit) – 3:39

UK CD (2010)

1. "Her Words Destroyed My Planet" (Radio Edit) – 3:39
2. "Her Words Destroyed My Planet" (Album Version) – 3:39
3. "Her Words Destroyed My Planet" (Instrumental) – 3:39

== Personnel ==
Motion City Soundtrack

- Justin Pierre – lead vocals, guitar
- Joshua Cain – guitar, vocals
- Jesse Johnson – Moog, keyboard
- Matt Taylor – bass guitar, percussion
- Tony Thaxton – drums

Production

- Mark Hoppus – producer
