= Telly =

Telly may refer to:

- A British colloquial term for television
- Telly Monster on Sesame Street
- Indian Telly Awards
- Telly (company), a television set manufacturer
- Telly (home entertainment server), a range of computer systems
- Telly Inc, American video discovery platform company
- Telly, the third MGM lion
- An abbreviated name for the Fender Telecaster guitar

== People ==
- Telly Hughes, American sportscaster
- Telly Leung (born 1980), American actor, singer, and songwriter
- Telly Savalas (1922–1994), American actor
