= L.G. Fuad =

Single by Motion City Soundtrack

from the album Commit This to Memory
- Released: 2006
- Recorded: October–November 2004; Seedy Underbelly Studios (Valley Village, California)
- Genre: Emo; pop punk; indie rock
- Length: 3:06
- Label: Epitaph
- Songwriter(s): Justin Pierre; Joshua Cain; Jesse Johnson; Matthew Taylor; Tony Thaxton
- Producer(s): Mark Hoppus

Motion City Soundtrack singles chronology
"Hold Me Down" (2006)	"L.G. Fuad" (2006)	"Broken Heart" (2007)

"L.G. Fuad" (abbreviation of "Let's Get Fucked Up and Die") is a song by American rock band Motion City Soundtrack, released in 2006 as the third and final single from the group's second studio album, Commit This to Memory (2005).

== Background ==
"L.G. FUAD"—which stands for "Let's Get Fucked Up and Die"—grew out of a night on Motion City Soundtrack's 2003 UK tour with the All-American Rejects, in which the latter band's merchandise manager was severely inebriated. He stood on the merchandise stand and shouted what became the song's refrain. All involved found great humor in the "mantra", which went on to be printed on business cards as a joke. The song takes from the Promise Ring's song "Forget Me" and its lyrical mention of forget-me-nots and marigolds. The song was recorded at Seedy Underbelly Studios, a suburban home converted into a studio in the city's Valley Village region. The song's title, and the non-capitalization of "Fuad", is a reference to L.L.Bean: "The band might disagree with my recollection of things, but I swear I was trying to reference the L.L.Bean catalogues my sister subscribed to that were all over the apartment we shared," Pierre wrote on Twitter in 2019.

The song's music video was directed by Josh Thacker. It was released with the deluxe edition of Commit This to Memory, first issued on June 19, 2006, and included on the accompanying Hooray for the Madness DVD.

== Reception ==
Nina Corcoran called it among the top 30 emo songs of all-time for a ranking by Vulture, writing: "With its comedically timed ellipses and overall air of dark humor, “L.G. FUAD” is a how-to lesson in sarcasm as a coping method, and it’s only gotten better with age."

== Personnel ==
Adapted from Commit This to Memory's liner notes.

Motion City Soundtrack

- Justin Pierre – lead vocals, guitar
- Joshua Cain – guitar, vocals
- Jesse Johnson – Moog, keyboard
- Matt Taylor – bass guitar, percussion, piano, vocals
- Tony Thaxton – drums, vocals

Production

- Mark Hoppus – production
- Tom Lord-Alge – mixing
- Ryan Hewitt – engineer, co-production
- Eric Olsen – engineer
- Jacques Wait – engineer
- Chris Testa – assistant engineer
- Femio Hernandez – assistant mixing
