= TeleSAT =

TeleSAT may refer to:

- Telecommunications satellite
- Telesat, a Canadian telecom satellite operator
- TéléSAT, a Belgian satellite television company

== See also ==
- Satellite television
- Satellite telephone
- Tele (disambiguation)
- SAT (disambiguation)
