= Commit This to Memory =

Studio album by Motion City Soundtrack
- Released: June 7, 2005
- Recorded: October–November 2004; Seedy Underbelly Studios (Valley Village, California); Sound Castle (Silver Lake, California); Cello Studios (Hollywood, California)
- Genres: Emo; pop punk
- Length: 39:19
- Label: Epitaph
- Producer: Mark Hoppus

Motion City Soundtrack chronology
I Am the Movie (2003)	Commit This to Memory (2005)	Even If It Kills Me (2007)

Singles from Commit This to Memory
- 1. "Everything Is Alright" Released: 2005; 2. "Hold Me Down" Released: 2006; 3. "L.G. Fuad" Released: 2006

Commit This to Memory is the second studio album by American rock band Motion City Soundtrack. Produced by Mark Hoppus, the album was released on June 7, 2005, in the United States by Epitaph Records. The Minnesota-based rock act formed in 1997, developing their emotionally-charged, pop-punk sound over the interim years. Their debut album, I Am the Movie, saw release on independent label Epitaph in 2003. It was followed with a heavy touring schedule, including stints on the Warped Tour and as the opening act for multi-platinum group Blink-182. Blink bassist Hoppus took a liking to the quintet, offering to produce their next studio effort.

Recorded over six weeks in late 2004, Commit This to Memory was created largely at Seedy Underbelly Studios, a suburban home converted into a studio in Los Angeles' Valley Village region. The album was partially composed there and in their hometown of Minneapolis, during a period in which frontman Justin Pierre was seeking treatment for alcohol abuse. He aimed for stronger storytelling in his lyricism, inspired by the work of Tom Waits, Ben Folds, and John K. Samson. Hoppus mainly worked with the band on finalizing song arrangements.

Commit This to Memory became the band's breakthrough and remains the band's most successful release. Both the album and main single "Everything Is Alright" were certified gold by the Recording Industry Association of America. The album peaked at number two on Billboard's Independent Albums chart. The singles' music videos achieved rotation on cable channel MTV2 while the band toured alongside Fall Out Boy and Panic! at the Disco. In 2014, The A.V. Club referred to the album as a pop punk classic, "full of hook-laden, keyboard-assisted songs whose bright melodies don't mask the despair and self-loathing lurking beneath them."

== Background ==
Motion City Soundtrack was formed in Minneapolis, Minnesota. Vocalist Justin Pierre and guitarist Joshua Cain were friends who had come up playing in several local bands. Influenced by the synth-heavy rock of bands like the Rentals and Superchunk, the duo formed Motion City Soundtrack in 1997. It went through several lineup changes, with the band gaining permanent members Tony Thaxton (drums), Jesse Johnson (keys) and Matthew Taylor (bass) in 2001. The quintet recorded and self-released their debut album, I Am the Movie, in 2002, selling copies out of the back of their tour van for a year. The next year, it was picked up for larger distribution through California-based independent label Epitaph, best known as the home of punk rockers the Offspring and Bad Religion. The group were part of an abundance of Epitaph signings, including Matchbook Romance and From First to Last, amid concerns the label had strayed too far from its roots, or "a little too emo." The band toured heavily in support of the LP, attracting a new fanbase; their 2004 stint on the famed Vans Warped Tour was considered a "must-see" among punk fans.

Their rise to prominence continued when the group joined Blink-182 - then one of the largest pop-punk acts worldwide - on a European arena tour. That band's bassist, Mark Hoppus, had first heard of the group from an employee at his clothing company, Atticus Clothing. He enjoyed the group so much that he raved about them in Rolling Stone magazine, and invited them to open for Blink. The six musicians became quick friends, frequently talking backstage before performances. Hoppus was developing an interest in recording music from a production standpoint, having recently acquired a large amount of gear and amplifiers. At the final show of the tour, Cain went to Hoppus' dressing room and asked him to produce their next record. Although Hoppus had never produced anything before, he was excited to be a part of the album and accepted the offer.

== Recording and production ==
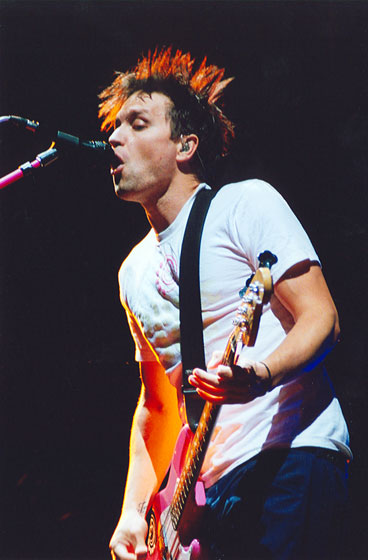
Mark Hoppus of Blink-182 produced the album.

The band first began writing songs at their rehearsal space in Minneapolis, which they nicknamed the "Dungeon" due to its ability to "suck the life and energy out of the band." For Pierre, the album came at the brink of a personal transition in which he began to seek treatment for alcohol abuse. He left the band during the writing stages for Los Angeles where he moved in with Epitaph founder Brett Gurewitz and began attending Alcoholics Anonymous meetings. Afterwards, the group rejoined Pierre in L.A. to begin recording demos for a month; the change of scenery brought about a new energy for the quintet. Commit This to Memory would be the first album by the band to feature material crafted by each musician in the group, as previous releases had featured songs written in the years prior to each member joining. "It was also the first time we had a lot more time and money to go in and feel like we were making a real record this time, whereas I Am the Movie was recorded in little segments here and there and eventually pieced together," said drummer Tony Thaxton.

Recording sessions for Commit This to Memory were booked by Hoppus and scheduled over six weeks at Seedy Underbelly Studios in the L.A. suburb of Valley Village. The studio was actually a rented house that had once belonged to Jeff Porcaro, the drummer for Toto. The band had, according to Hoppus, "a million ideas and a lot of energy and enthusiasm to make a great record". Living in a suburb, the neighbors had called police to the band and Hoppus several times for being too loud at night time, especially when Hoppus brought a Roland TR-808 drum machine outside to work on a song late at night. According to Pierre, Hoppus was not interested in putting his own stamp on the music, but rather bringing out the best in what he saw in the group. Hoppus generally modeled his production after Jerry Finn (a longtime producer of Blink-182), and therefore it involved much watching and listening. "Mark kept telling us, 'Your name is going to be a lot bigger on the front than mine is on the back'," recalled Justin Pierre, "So he would throw suggestions out there but always say, 'Feel free to turn these down.' And we would!"

Pierre characterized Hoppus as both "very involved and not involved", with his job as producer mainly giving notes on the sound of the instruments and offering suggestions to improve songs. Hoppus mostly worked with the band on arrangements, believing the songs were too packed and "needed to breathe". Hoppus mentioned that label politics had hindered the creativity of Blink's Take Off Your Pants and Jacket (2001), and did not want to see the same fate befall the band. He was "meticulous" in his approach, partially due to the fact that it was his first production job. Hoppus was the one who advised the band to merge two previously unrelated songs—a slower, softer song and a pulsating drum track—into one, which became "Time Turned Fragile". The frontman of Fall Out Boy, Patrick Stump, contributed guest vocals to "Everything Is Alright", and Hoppus to "Hangman". With production completed, Hoppus was very excited for the band that he felt was on the cusp of "great things", recalling, "After six weeks of these guys living all together in two rooms of this house with a studio attached they created this amazingly beautiful and honest album. Justin's lyrics are so brutally truthful." The group completed recording in November 2004, and judged final mixes over the interim months. Pierre later called Commit This to Memory his personal favorite album by the band.

== Music and lyrics ==
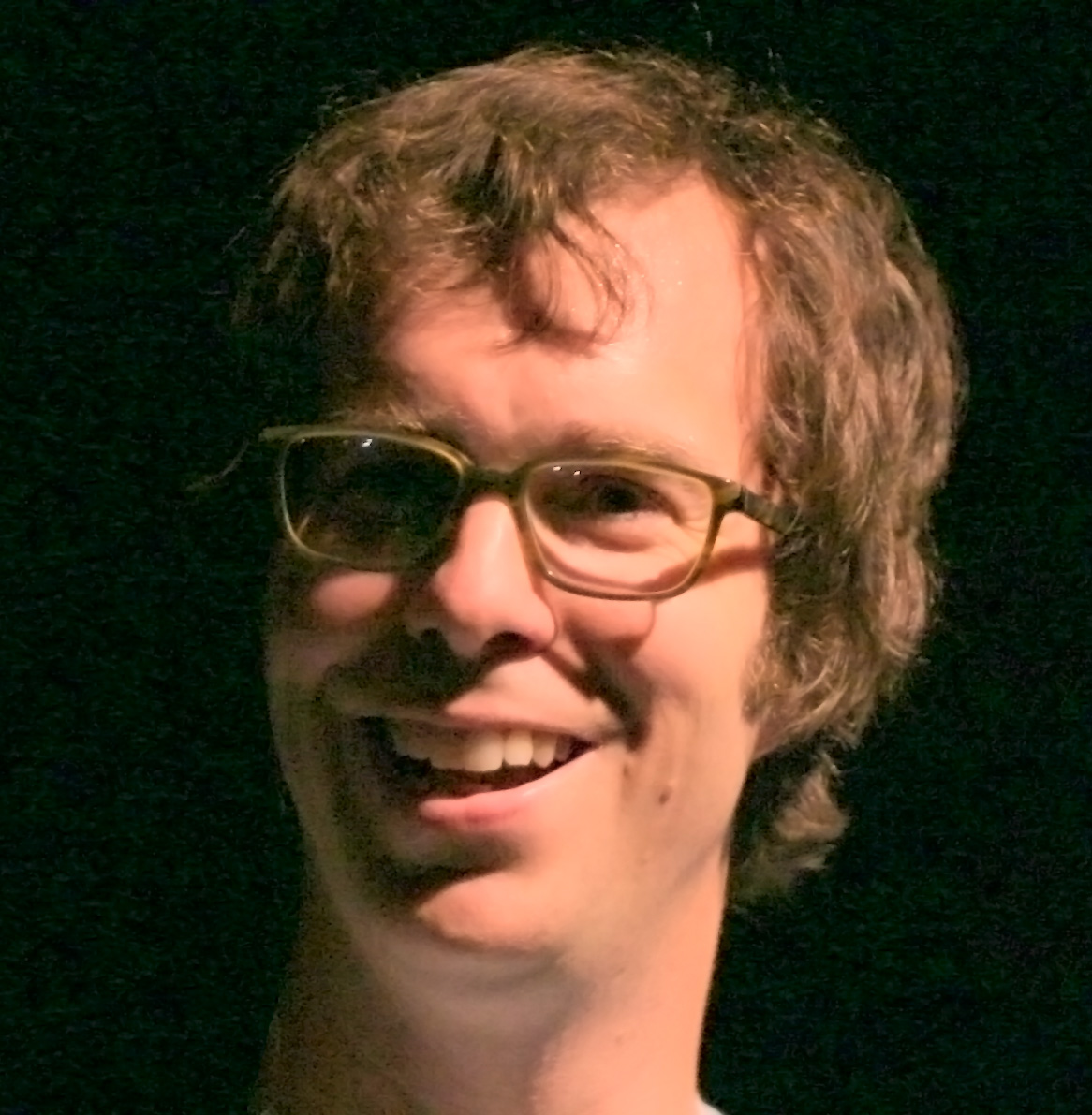

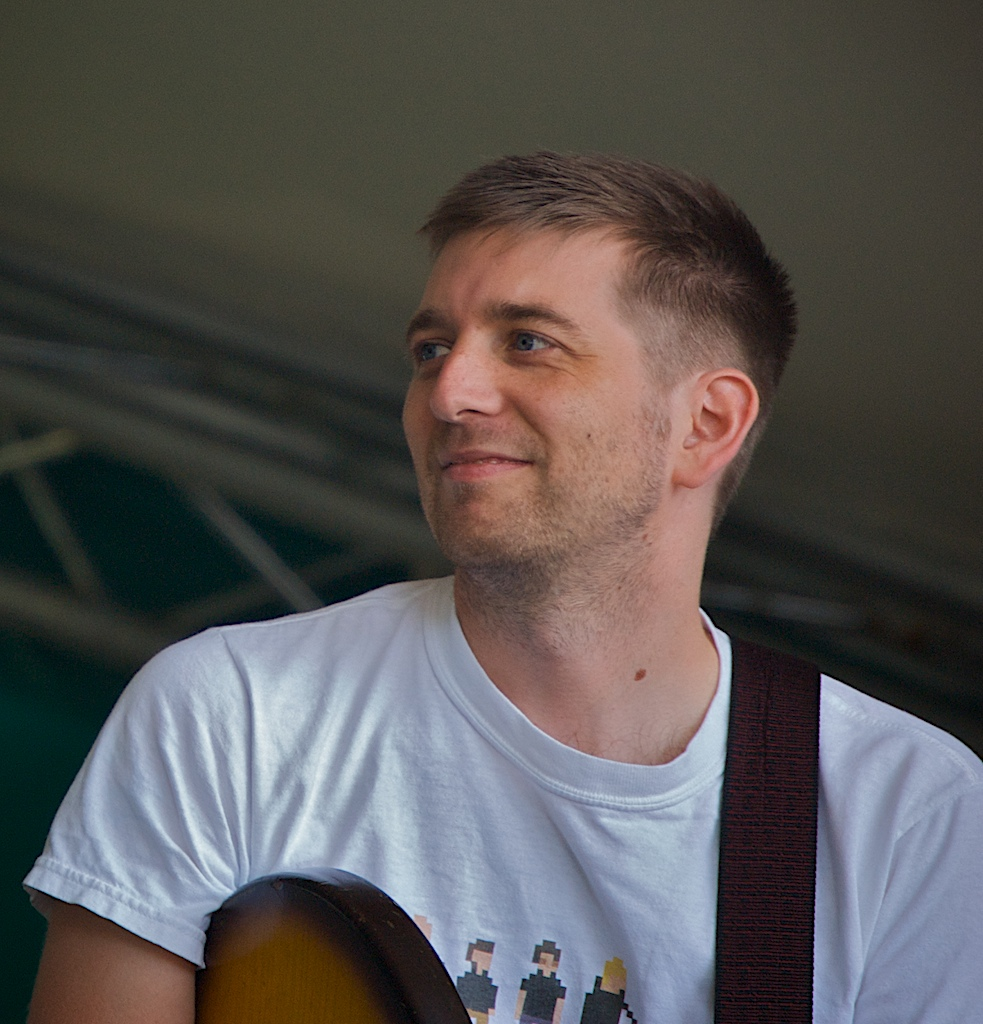
Pierre hoped to emulate the writing styles of Tom Waits, Ben Folds and John K. Samson.

In a 2015 interview, Pierre notes that fans have told him that they find Commit This to Memory a "winter album", to which he agrees, noting the unintentional mention of the new year in several songs. His lyricism on Commit This to Memory centralizes around change and, in his words, "being a complete fuckup, yet, at the same time, being somewhat successful". On the record, he "addresses the themes of substance abuse, psychological disorders and failing relationships." Pierre penned "Everything Is Alright" as a summary of his OCD (Obsessive–compulsive disorder) tendencies. He intended to utilize his social anxiety and fears in the song's form, which he has since employed in numerous other compositions. "I don't think the [phrase] "tongue-in-cheek" is correct, but it's something where the verses are one thing and then the chorus is another, but it's sort of like giving yourself a pep talk", said Pierre. The song's lyrics include hating such mundane things as "theme parks, flying, strangers, [and] waiting in line," things that Pierre genuinely disliked at the time of the song's writing. For the record, he intended to simplify his lyrics to enhance storytelling and he drew inspiration from Tom Waits, Ben Folds and John K. Samson's writing styles. Keeping in the Waits/Folds inspiration, Pierre strove to write from another person's point of view; in the case of "Time Turned Fragile", it is sung from the perspective of his father. Pierre has also suggested the Carpenters were an unlikely influence, observing "it’s similar how both their music and [Memory] has a darkness lurking underneath it all."

"L.G. Fuad"
The band's style combines Pierre's dark lyrics with more upbeat music, including prominent use of the Moog synthesizer.

Pierre has in retrospect labeled half of the album's writing as being completed while inebriated and the other half while getting sober. For example, he penned the lyrics to "Attractive Today" and "Time Turned Fragile" while drunk in his apartment, in a "sad and lonely place". In this approach, words mostly "just came out", and were not substantially revised. In addition, he was listening to the 2003 album Reconstruction Site by the Weakerthans, and found himself inspired by the songwriting of frontman John K. Samson. Pierre would often take lyrics from other bands songs for song titles; "Time Turned Fragile" is lifted from a lyric in Limbeck's "Julia", while "Together We'll Ring in the New Year" was pulled from the Tom Waits song "Please Wake Me Up". "L.G. Fuad"—which stands for "Let's Get Fucked Up and Die"—grew out of a night on Motion City Soundtrack's 2003 UK tour with The All-American Rejects, in which the latter band's merchandise manager was severely inebriated. He stood on the merchandise stand and shouted what became the song's refrain. All involved found great humor in the "mantra", which went on to be printed on business cards as a joke. "Hold Me Down" was inspired by a former roommate of Pierre's. After she had moved out, Pierre found a portion of her math homework in a couch cushion, leading to him imagining a scenario of finding a letter from a departed lover.

The album has been called definitive of pop punk. Joshua Cain dismissed this label, remarking, "I definitely wouldn't consider us a pop-punk band. Our influences are more based on '90s bands like Superchunk and early Weezer." Pierre strove for the record to have a sound that resembled the bands Braid, Superchunk, Jawbox and the Pixies.

== Reception and legacy ==
Professional ratings
Review scores
Source	Rating
AbsolutePunk	(Favorable)
Allmusic	3.5/5 stars
Alternative Press	link
Entertainment Weekly	(mixed)
PopMatters	(5/10)

Upon its release, Commit This to Memory received general acclaim from music critics. Scott Heisel of Alternative Press wrote that "Memory is an inspired, mature sophomore disc chock full of catchy, intelligent pop-rock." Allmusic's Johnny Loftus considered the band more intelligent and sophisticated than their Warped Tour peers: "Motion City Soundtrack['s] wistful memories, tales of breaking up, and frantic searches for answers [are] realer than the next pop-punk combo on the quadruple summertime bill." Jennifer Maerz of Entertainment Weekly ended her review with the note that "MCS' slick, soaring anthems ultimately unite the spirits of those who see themselves, like Pierre, as 'lifeless corners of this empty frame.'" Mark Griffiths of Kerrang! wrote, "It's a bright and invigorating affair [...] and is, in short, fantastic." The Washington Post's Marianne Meyer opined that the record "nimbly moves from skittish rhythms to genuinely tender sentiment."

Jessica Grose of Spin favorably compared it to Blink-182's Enema of the State (1999). Tony McMenamin of Blender deemed it the publication's album of the month, calling it "a charged mix of instantly catchy pop-punk lashings and somber acoustic wailings."

The album was leaked to file sharing websites within a day of the final mastering and months before its official release. It debuted on the Billboard 200 in the issue dated June 25, 2005 at position 72, selling 16,000 copies in its opening week. It charted better on the magazine's Independent Albums chart, where it peaked at number two. By the end of its inaugural year, the album had moved 125,000 units. The last official estimate placed it at 285,000 albums sold in the U.S., but Pierre said in 2015 interview that the number is closer to 500,000. The band's music videos found regular rotation on networks such as MTV2, and the band also performed on Late Night with Conan O'Brien. Rolling Stone's Lauren Gilton considered the album a sleeper hit. Nevertheless, the band's breakthrough brought naysayers, and the group became targets for critics of pop punk: "[the band was] frequently characterized as the sort of ultra-commercial punk poseurs who water down the genre to the point of drowning it."

Subsequent reviews of the album have continued to be positive. In 2014, The A.V. Club referred to the album as a classic of pop punk, "full of hook-laden, keyboard-assisted songs whose bright melodies don't mask the despair and self-loathing lurking beneath them." Reyan Ali of Cincinnati CityBeat wrote that Commit This to Memory "absolutely bleeds charm", commenting, "Even with all the dire thematic matter Pierre's lyrics covered, [...] the band framed the words with music that sparkled, owing to spunky, inspired hooks, full-sounding record production and ample doses of Moog." Alternative Press's Tyler Sharp deemed the record a "classic", while Taylor Morgan of OC Weekly called it "the soundtrack of millennial youth, reminiscent of breakups, making out, goofing off, and growing up." James Rettig at Stereogum termed it their best album. BuzzFeed included the album at number 21 on their "36 Pop Punk Albums You Need To Hear Before You F——ing Die" list. NME listed the album as one of "20 Pop Punk Albums Which Will Make You Nostalgic".

Angelo Spagnolo of BuzzFeed wrote that "Commit This To Memory is the type of record your ex left in your car and you pull it from beneath the seat a year later and listen as a flood of memories punches you in the lungs."

== Touring ==
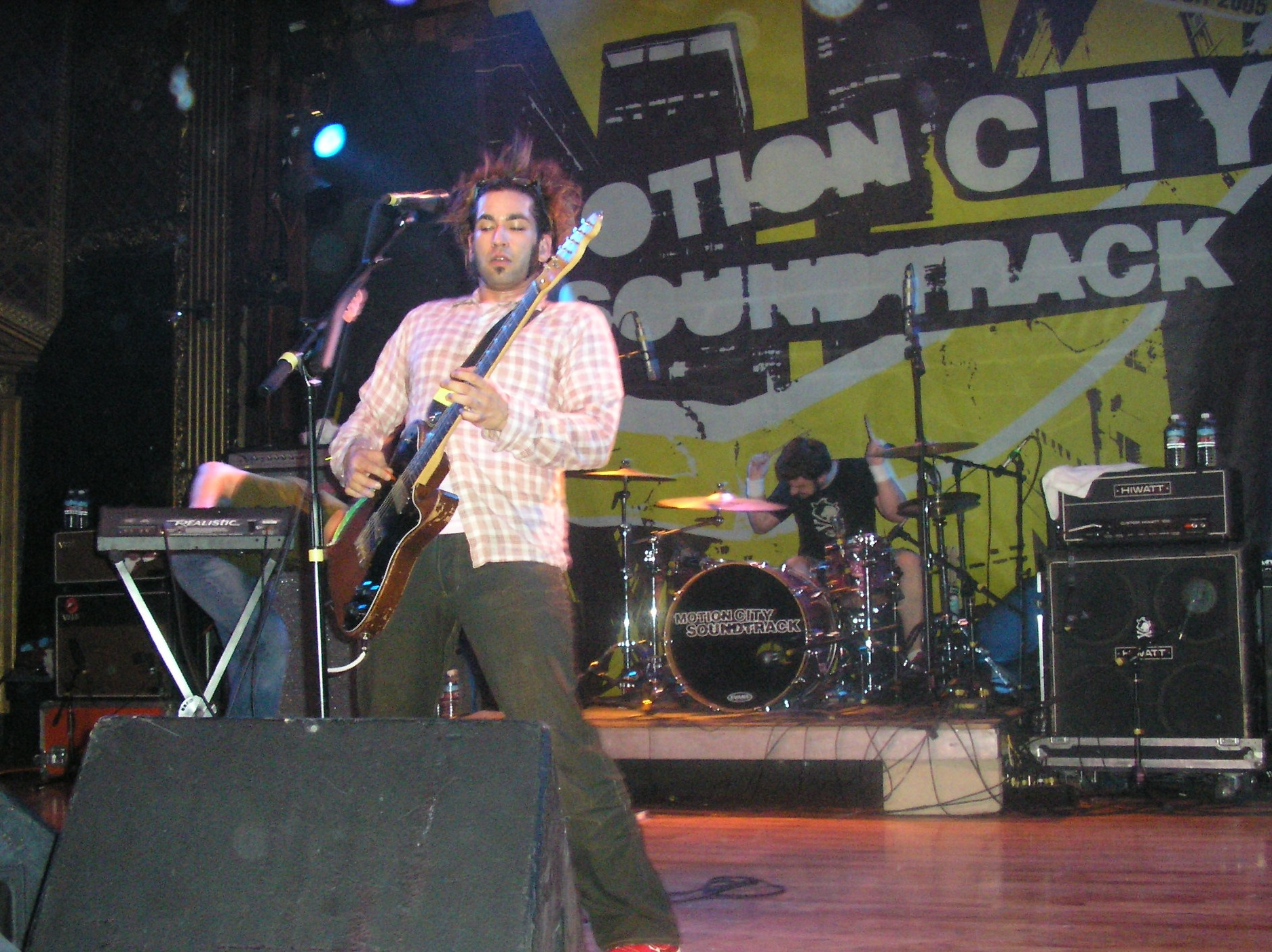
The band performs in Denver, Colorado in February 2005.

During the recording of the album, the band embarked on their first headlining tour, The Sub-Par Punk Who Cares Tour 2004. After recording, the band set out on the inaugural Epitaph Tour, alongside Matchbook Romance and From First to Last, with appearances by the Matches and Scatter the Ashes on select dates. The tour visited every major US city, and ran from February 2 to March 19, 2005. The band played to larger crowds on the tours supporting the album, including over 9,000 fans on a Chicago date in 2005. The group "toured incessantly", including dates on the Warped Tour 2005. Afterwards, the band joined the Nintendo Fusion Tour with Fall Out Boy, Panic! at the Disco, and The Starting Line, which was their largest nationwide tour to that point. The group had been friends with Fall Out Boy for many years prior, having both played side-by-side before either group found their respective success. The next year, the band also played more U.S. shows with OK Go and Plain White Ts, and again headlined the Warped Tour.

The band has on two occasions celebrated the album's tenth and seventeenth anniversaries, respectively, with full-album concerts. The band first played the album in full in 2009; in 2012, they played the full record as part of their "4 Albums. 2 Nights. 7 Cities" jaunt. They embarked on a tour celebrating the tenth anniversary of the album between January and February 2015; the group later extended this outing, and further toured the album between June and August 2015. The band planned to celebrate the album's fifteenth birthday with another anniversary tour, but the COVID-19 pandemic shunted their plans; these shows were later performed in 2022.

== Track listing ==
All tracks are written by Motion City Soundtrack.

Commit This to Memory
No.	Title	Length
1.	"Attractive Today"	1:42
2.	"Everything Is Alright"	3:26
3.	"When "You're" Around"	2:51
4.	"Resolution"	3:48
5.	"Feel Like Rain"	3:34
6.	"Make Out Kids"	3:04
7.	"Time Turned Fragile"	4:15
8.	"L.G. Fuad"	3:06
9.	"Better Open the Door"	3:00
10.	"Together We'll Ring in the New Year"	2:13
11.	"Hangman"	2:51
12.	"Hold Me Down"	5:19

Deluxe Edition
No.	Title	Length
13.	"Invisible Monsters"	3:55

== Personnel ==
Credits adapted from the album's liner notes.

Band

- Justin Pierre – lead vocals, guitar
- Joshua Cain – guitar, backing vocals
- Jesse Johnson – Moog, keyboards
- Matt Taylor – bass guitar, backing vocals, piano, percussion
- Tony Thaxton – drums, percussion

Additional musicians

- Patrick Stump – additional vocals on "Everything Is Alright"
- Robb MacLean – additional vocals on "Everything Is Alright"
- Patrick Carrie – additional vocals on "Everything Is Alright"
- Mark Hoppus – additional vocals on "Hangman"

Production

- Mark Hoppus – producer
- Ryan Hewitt – co-producer, engineer
- Chris Testa – assistant engineer
- Jacques Wait – additional assistance
- Eric Olsen – additional assistance
- Tom Lord-Alge – mixing (tracks 1–4, 8)
- Mark Trombino – mixing (tracks 5–7, 9–13)
- Femio Hernandez – assistant mix engineer (tracks 1–4, 8)
- Cameron Barton – assistant mix engineer (tracks 5–7, 9–13)
- Tom Baker – mastering

Design

- Nick Pritchard – artwork, design
- Bryan Sheffield – photography

== Charts ==
=== Weekly charts ===
Chart (2005)	Peak position
UK Independent Albums (Official Charts)	41
UK Rock & Metal Albums (Official Charts)	37
US Billboard 200	72
US Independent Albums (Billboard)	2

=== Year-end charts ===
Chart (2005)	Position
US Independent Albums (Billboard)	39

== Certifications ==
Region	Certification	Certified units/sales
United States (RIAA)	Gold	500,000^{‡}
^{‡} Sales+streaming figures based on certification alone.
