= Broken Heart (Motion City Soundtrack song) =

Single by Motion City Soundtrack

from the album Even If It Kills Me
- Released: June 26, 2007 (Digital download); July 18, 2007 (Japan)
- Genre: Pop punk, emo
- Length: 3:01
- Label: Epitaph
- Songwriters: Joshua Cain, Jesse Johnson, Matthew Taylor, Tony Thaxton, Justin Pierre

Motion City Soundtrack singles chronology
"L.G. Fuad" (2006)	"Broken Heart" (2007)	"This Is for Real" (2007)

"Broken Heart" is the first single from American band Motion City Soundtrack's 2007 album Even If It Kills Me. It was released on June 26, 2007 through most digital outlets. It was also released physically and exclusively in Japan on July 18, 2007. A video for the single was released a few days prior.

== Music video ==
The song's music video was directed by Jesse Cain, brother of the band's guitarist Joshua Cain, and stars Nels Lennes, who also appears in the video for "L.G. FUAD" as well as Justin Pierre's short film "Karen". It was filmed in Minneapolis, Minnesota.

The video starts out with a door being shut on a man whose girlfriend and he likely just had a bitter breakup. The man reaches into a hole in his chest and pulls out his heart, dropping it on the ground and walking away. The heart reappears as another man in a heart costume. He walks around, depressed. Back at his apartment he sees an advertisement for a self-help book called How to be Happy. He follows the instructions in the book, respectively: "1. Smile, 2. Treat Your Body Well, 3. Eat Right, 4. Be At Peace and You Are So Happy!"

After finishing the final chapter, still failing to be happy, the heart sees two dogs playing together in a pet store. This makes him more depressed which results in him trying to kill himself. He is rescued and the next scene is of him in a hospital bed next to a young girl that needed a heart transplant. He smiles and dances around in his bed. The heart is then transplanted into the girl. The final scene shows her jumping off her swing smiling wide. The camera zooms-in on the heart, which is also very happy and dancing in place inside the girl.

== Track listings ==
=== Digital download ===
1. "Broken Heart" – 3:06

=== Japan single ===
1. "Fell in Love Without You" – 2:33
2. "Broken Heart" – 3:03
3. "The Worst Part..." – 4:19
4. "The Future Freaks Me Out" (Live) – 4:26
5. "L.G. Fuad" (Live) – 3:06
