= This Is for Real (song) =

Single by Motion City Soundtrack

from the album Even if it Kills Me
- Released: August 7, 2007
- Recorded: 2007
- Genre: Pop punk
- Length: 3:10
- Label: Epitaph
- Songwriters: Joshua Cain, Jesse Johnson, Matthew Taylor, Tony Thaxton, Justin Pierre

Motion City Soundtrack singles chronology
"Broken Heart" (2007)	"This Is for Real" (2007)	"It Had to Be You" (2008)

"This Is for Real" is a song by the pop punk band Motion City Soundtrack. It is the second single off their third studio album, Even If It Kills Me. It was digitally released on August 7, 2007, and physically released on September 3, 2007, in the United Kingdom. The song impacted radio on September 25, 2007.

== Music video ==
The music video, directed by Jay Martin, features the band playing in a bowling alley. In addition to performing the song as Motion City Soundtrack, each band member, except for Pierre, plays as a different character that appears in the video. Johnson plays an old man, Taylor plays a Boy Scout, Cain plays a biker, and Thaxton plays as a man with an '80s style mullet. The video was officially released by the band on September 10, 2007, on mtvU.com.

== Trivia ==
- A portion of the song is also featured on an AMC commercial advertising its annual "Monsterfest" 10-day special.
- The song was released into the Singstar Singstore on December 12.
- The song was also featured in the trailer for the film 17 Again starring Zac Efron that came out April 17, 2009.
- The bass guitar is a Fender Japanese Jaguar Hot Rod Red Bass.

== Track listing ==
CD

1. "This Is for Real"
2. "Plymouth Rock (Lifter Puller cover)"

CD 2

1. "This Is for Real"
2. "Not Asking You to Leave"

AU CD

1. "This Is for Real"
2. "Not Asking You to Leave"
3. "Plymouth Rock (Lifter Puller cover)"

iTunes download

1. "This Is for Real"
2. "Broken Heart" (Acoustic)

Download

1. "This Is for Real"
2. "The Worst Part..."

== Charts ==
Chart (2007)	Peak position
Australia (ARIA)	48
UK Singles (Official Charts Company)	154
UK Indie (OCC)	6
