= Nuno Borges Carvalho =

Portuguese professor and a senior research scientist

Nuno Miguel Gonçalves Borges de Carvalho from the Universidade de Aveiro, Aveiro, Portugal was named Fellow of the Institute of Electrical and Electronics Engineers (IEEE) in 2015 for contributions on characterization and design of nonlinear RF circuits.

Carvalho was born in Luanda, Angola, in 1972. He received the Diploma and Doctoral degrees in electronics and telecommunications engineering from the University of Aveiro in Portugal, in 1995 and 2000, respectively.

Carvalho is currently a full professor and a senior research scientist with the Institute of Telecommunications, University of Aveiro and an IEEE Fellow. He coauthored Intermodulation in Microwave and Wireless Circuits (Artech House, 2003), Microwave and Wireless Measurement Techniques (Cambridge University Press, 2013) and White Space Communication Technologies (Cambridge University Press, 2014).

Carvalho has been a reviewer and author of over 200 papers in magazines and conferences. He is associate editor of the IEEE Microwave Magazine and Cambridge Wireless Power Transfer Journal and former associate editor of the IEEE Transactions on Microwave Theory and Techniques.

He is the co-inventor of six patents. His main research interests include software-defined radio front-ends, wireless power transmission, nonlinear distortion analysis in microwave/wireless circuits and systems, and measurement of nonlinear phenomena. He has recently been involved in the design of dedicated radios and systems for newly emerging wireless technologies.

Carvalho is the chair of the IEEE MTT-20 Technical Committee and the past-chair of the IEEE Portuguese Section and MTT-11 and also belong to the technical committees, MTT-24 and MTT-26. He is also the vice-chair of the URSI Commission A (Metrology Group). He was the recipient of the 1995 University of Aveiro and the Portuguese Engineering Association Prize for the best 1995 student at the University of Aveiro, the 1998 Student Paper Competition (Third Place) of the IEEE Microwave Theory and Techniques Society (IEEE MTT-S) International Microwave Symposium (IMS), and the 2000 IEE Measurement Prize.

Carvalho is a Distinguished Microwave Lecturer for the IEEE Microwave Theory and Techniques Society.

Last 2 years publications in Journals

1. R. Cordeiro, A.P. Prata, A. Oliveira, J. Vieira, N.B.C. Carvalho, Agile All-Digital RF Transceiver Implemented in FPGA, IEEE Trans. on Microwave Theory and Tech., Vol. 65, No. 11, pp. 4229 – 4240, November, 2017
2. F. Pereira, R. Correia, N.B.C. Carvalho, Passive Sensors for Long Duration Internet of Things Networks, MDPI Sensors, Vol. 17, No. 10, pp. 2268 – 2268, October, 2017,
3. A.P. Prata, J. Santos, A. Oliveira, N.B.C. Carvalho, Agile All-Digital DPD Feedback Loop, IEEE Trans. on Microwave Theory and Tech., Vol. 65, No. 7, pp. 2476 – 2484, July, 2017,
4. N.B.C. Carvalho, P. Pinho, A. Boaventura, P.M. Cruz, R. D. Fernandes, R. Gonçalves, D. Belo, Europe and the Future for WPT : European Contributions to Wireless Power Transfer Technology, IEEE Microwave Magazine, Vol. 18, No. 4, pp. 56 – 87, June, 2017,
5. M. Jordão, P.M. Cruz, D. Ribeiro, A.P. Prata, N.B.C. Carvalho, M. Bossche, D. Vye, Mixed-Signal Instrumentation for Design and Test of 5G Systems, Microwave Journal, Vol. 60, No. 4, pp. 98 – 111, April, 2017
6. R. Correia, A. Boaventura, N.B.C. Carvalho, Quadrature Amplitude Backscatter Modulator for Passive Wireless Sensors in IoT Applications, IEEE Trans. on Microwave Theory and Tech., Vol. 65, No. 4, pp. 1103 – 1110, February, 2017
7. R. Gonçalves, P. Pinho, N.B.C. Carvalho, Small antenna design for very compact devices and wearables, IET Microwaves Antennas & Propagation, Vol. --, No. --, pp. 1 – 12, January, 2017
8. A.P. Prata, D. Ribeiro, P.M. Cruz, A. Oliveira, N.B.C. Carvalho, RF Subsampling Feedback Loop Technique for Concurrent Dual-Band PA Linearization, IEEE Trans. on Microwave Theory and Tech., Vol. 64, No. 12, pp. 1 – 9, December, 2016
9. R. Gonçalves, P. Pinho, N.B.C. Carvalho, Wireless energy transfer: Dielectric lens antennas for beam shaping in wireless power-transfer applications, Comptes Rendus Physique, Vol. 1, No. 1, pp. 1 – 1, December, 2016,
10. N.B.C. Carvalho, J. Santos, A. Oliveira, A. Boaventura, Perfect Isolation: Dealing with Self-Jamming in Passive RFID Systems, IEEE Microwave Magazine, Vol. 17, No. 11, pp. 20 – 39, November, 2016,
11. R. Correia, N.B.C. Carvalho, S. Kawasaki, Continuously Power Delivering for Passive Backscatter Wireless Sensor Networks, IEEE Trans. on Microwave Theory and Tech., Vol. PP, No. 99, pp. 1 – 9, September, 2016
12. J. Santos, DACD Dinis, D. Riscado, G. Anjos, D. Belo, A. Oliveira, P. Monteiro, N.B.C. Carvalho, A flexible physical layer and fronthaul research testbed for C-RAN, Journal of Microprocessors and Microsystems (MICPRO), Vol. 00, No. 00, pp. 1 – 11, September, 2016,
13. W. Jang, R. Cordeiro, A. Oliveira, N.B.C. Carvalho, A Broadband Almost-Digital Radio Frequency Transmitter with an Efficient Power Amplifier, IEEE Trans. on Microwave Theory and Tech., Vol. 64, No. 5, pp. 1526 – 1534, May, 2016,
14. P. Pinho, N.B.C. Carvalho, T.M. Moura, High-efficiency D-TV energy harvesting system for low-input power, Wireless Power Transfer, Vol. 3, No. 1, pp. 34 – 42, March, 2016,
15. R. Gonçalves, R. L. Magueta, P. Pinho, N.B.C. Carvalho, Dissipation Factor and Permittivity Estimation of Dielectric Substrates Using a Single Microstrip Line Measurement, Applied Computational Electromagnetics Society Journal, Vol. 31, No. 2, pp. 118 – 125, February, 2016
