= Even If It Kills Me =

Even if It Kills Me

Studio album by Motion City Soundtrack
- Released: September 18, 2007
- Recorded: Early 2007
- Studios: Stratosphere (Chelsea, Manhattan); Electric Lady (Greenwich Village, Manhattan)
- Genres: Alternative rock; power pop; emo; pop punk
- Length: 43:29
- Label: Epitaph
- Producers: Ric Ocasek; Adam Schlesinger; Eli Janney; Motion City Soundtrack

Motion City Soundtrack chronology
Commit This to Memory (2005)	Even if It Kills Me (2007)	My Dinosaur Life (2010)

Singles from Even if It Kills Me
- 1. "Broken Heart" Released: June 26, 2007; 2. "This Is for Real" Released: August 7, 2007; 3. "It Had to Be You" Released: March 11, 2008

Even if It Kills Me is the third studio album by American rock band Motion City Soundtrack. Produced by Ric Ocasek, Adam Schlesinger, and Eli Janney, the album was released on September 18, 2007, in the United States by Epitaph Records. Motion City Soundtrack, based in Minneapolis, Minnesota, made a breakthrough with their second album, Commit This to Memory, garnering praise and independent buzz upon its 2005 release. Following the release, the band toured relentlessly over the next two years, during which time frontman Justin Pierre struggled with alcohol and substance abuse. These addictions were infused into the writing process of Even If Kills Me, which was recorded in early 2007 Stratosphere Studios in Chelsea and the legendary Electric Lady Studios in Greenwich Village.

The album debuted at number 16 on the Billboard 200 and number one on the magazine's Independent Albums chart, representing a career best at the time. "Broken Heart" and "This Is for Real" were the album's first two singles. The album received largely favorable reviews from music critics; Spin called the set "near-perfect pop", while The New York Times described it as "one long sugar rush".

== Background ==
The band played to larger crowds on the tours supporting Commit This to Memory, including over 9,000 fans on a Chicago date in 2005. The group "toured incessantly", including dates on the Warped Tour 2005. Afterwards, the band joined the Nintendo Fusion Tour with Fall Out Boy, Panic! at the Disco, and The Starting Line, which was their largest nationwide tour to that point.

During this time, Pierre's substance abuse nearly disbanded the group. "I think it's an understatement to say it is tough to be tied to Justin's emotions," Cain later remarked.

== Recording and production ==
Even if It Kills Me was recorded in early 2007 at Stratosphere Studios in Chelsea and Electric Lady Studios in Greenwich Village. While recording the album, Pierre strove to sing more softly than he had in the past, out of fear he would blow his voice out touring the album. He later felt his vocal performances on the album were not his best. He struggled with writer's block during the sessions and found himself writing lyrics while recording the song, which had never happened before. In addition, the band were worried their songs would not be catchy enough after their predecessor was so successful. The album was co-produced by Adam Schlesinger of Fountains of Wayne and Eli Janney of Girls Against Boys. "Adam works 10 times faster than most people and he's already onto the next thing before you have a chance to think about what you did, so it was kind of like playing catch up," Pierre later recalled.

The record was also partly produced by Ric Ocasek of The Cars. Weezer's 1994 debut (produced by Ocasek) was among the band's collective favorite albums, and they jumped at the chance to work with Ocasek. The band was close to not booking Ocasek, "but he called us back at the 11th hour," said Pierre. Schlesinger and Janney pushed the band to try new things, while Ocasek was more content with leaving things as is; "Working with Ric, we'd think the guitars were out of tune, but he'd be, 'Perfect!'" said Taylor. Pierre expanded upon this in a 2015 interview, noting that he was disappointed with Ocasek's involvement:

Then the other half of the record was working with Ric Ocasek… when he showed up. That was probably one of the weirdest experiences because I think we thought one thing and found out another; oftentimes he would be there for a couple of hours a day and he just confused me the whole time and I didn't really know what he was talking about. [...] For a while, I was nervous about saying anything about my experience of working with Ric but it was kind of a bum-out because literally, I didn't understand a thing he said. I would do something terrible and he'd go, "It doesn't get any better than that." And then I'd do something I thought was great and he'd be like, "Do it again." So I think he was just playing some sort of head game with me or us the whole time.

Pierre called Chris Shaw, Ocasek's engineer, the "MVP" of the album, noting that he picked the best vocal takes and made it sound "amazing." Following completion of the album, Pierre entered a three-week rehabilitation program for alcohol and drug abuse. The band was apart for a six-week stretch in the summer of 2007, marking their longest break apart in five years. "It might sound cliched, but we all had a chance to do some growing up," said Cain.

== Composition ==
Pierre's improved mental state inspired the lyrics; whereas his work on Commit This to Memory was dark and lonely due to being in a "bad state of mind," Even if It Kills Me is more optimistic and less self-loathing. The album still finds Pierre "stuck between bursting bouts of giddiness and depression," best reflected in the album's singles, which represent "flip sides of the romantic coin." The presence of Johnson's Moog is stronger than it was on the band's last effort, where it took a back seat to guitar-driven rock.

"Last Night" originated counter to the band's typical writing process: Cain began finger-picking on the guitar, which was already unusual to the band's style, and the group composed the song on the spot. Pierre wrote the lyrics in one sitting, with the demo version's lyrics bearing close resemblance to the final version. Drawing inspiration from the film Memento (2000), he noted to an interviewer that he included a secret code to the song: "Think of that movie and then listen to that song again. It might make more sense." The song lacks traditional elements of pop music, but retains its catchiness; the song was Cain's favorite, as it reminded him of the work of the Cure or Death Cab for Cutie. "The Conversation" is a "minimalist piano ballad" unlike much anything the band had done to this point. The song arose when Taylor was tooling around a piano at the band's rehearsal space, and Pierre accompanied him. Initially, they were unsure due to the song's bare structure (piano and vocals only), and felt it too reminiscent of the work of Ben Folds (the band's resident Ben Folds fanatic, drummer Tony Thaxton, urged them to go ahead with the original, which he deemed "not too Ben Folds. In fact, it's not Ben Folds enough.") The song is based on a conversation Pierre had with his girlfriend during a relationship that fell apart during the writing of their previous album.

"Hello Helicopter" is the band's only overtly political track, and is written from an apathetic point of view. "I try not to be too heavy-handed. It's kind of just a laundry list of things that bum me out," said Pierre. The song includes guest vocals from Max Bemis of Say Anything, Rachel Minton of Zolof the Rock and Roll Destroyer and Shawn Harris of The Matches. "Antonia" was written about the idiosyncrasies that compose one unique individual.

== Release ==
While the band were aware that Even If Kills Me could be considered their commercial breakthrough, the record that "propels [them] into a Fall Out Boy-like orbit within the mainstream," Cain told a reporter in 2007 that "ultimately I don't think we care that much. We do our thing, and people like it or they don't." While CD sales had fallen dramatically over the course of the decade, the band did very well on the touring circuit. Johnson noted that while the band failed to secure a gold record, radio airplay or MTV hits, they nonetheless had "dedicated fans, and we're really lucky for that." The band's music was considered not "edgy" enough for modern rock playlists and not mainstream enough for contemporary hit radio.

Even if It Kills Me was a career-best upon its debut: it peaked at number 16 on the Billboard 200 and number one on the magazine's Independent Albums chart. The album debuted with 33,000 copies sold, according to Nielsen SoundScan, which more than doubled their best sales week two years prior. Three songs from Even if It Kills Me were released as singles. The first, "Broken Heart", was released three months before the album as a digital download on June 26, 2007. "This Is for Real" was released as the second single on August 7, 2007, in the US and on September 3 in the UK. It was released digitally, on CD and on limited edition 7" vinyl, and included three different B-sides; "Not Asking You to Leave", an acoustic version of "Broken Heart" (featuring Korin Louise Cox of The Hard Lessons) and a cover version of the Lifter Puller song "Plymouth Rock". The band shot a video for "This Is for Real" in Southern California in August 2007, which was premiered on mtvU.com on September 10. The third single, "It Had to Be You", was released in early 2008, with a stop motion music video accompanying it.

== Reception ==
Professional ratings
Review scores
Source	Rating
AbsolutePunk	83%
AllMusic	3.5/5 stars
Alternative Press	3/5 stars
Big Cheese	5/5 stars
Blender	3/5 stars
CWG	4/4 stars
PopMatters	6/10
Rocklouder!	4/5 stars
Spin	(favorable)

Even if It Kills Me received a Metascore of 68 on aggregator Metacritic, indicating generally favorable reviews from six critics. Spin endorsed the album, saying, "Motion City have deftly filled that space between emotional adolescence and responsible adulthood with this set of near-perfect pop." The New York Times reviewer Kelefa Sanneh commended the record. "Together they made an album that sounds like one long sugar rush, and so long as the rush lasts, it sounds pretty great." He praised singer Justin Pierre who he says "never sounds better than when he's rushing from an overwritten verse into a perfectly simple refrain." Allmusic's Andrew Leahey also praised Pierre, saying he "is the star of this album". Leahey said the departure of Blink-182 from the fray could have prompted Motion City Soundtrack to become "the genre's new torchbearers". He went on to state that the band's "dedication to the pop genre... with roots in something harder" is a trait that could also be attributed to The Cars, of which one of the album's producers Ric Ocasek, was the frontman. He declared the band's choice to use three producers avoided "that nebulous point on Memory and I Am the Movie where the albums' final tracks begin to suffer from being so similar to their predecessors... There's no lull here, just fast-paced fun". However, entangled with the positivity, Leahey did observe the album's tendency to "consciously aim for commercial acceptance, but rarely at the expense of the quirks and literate lyrics that first endeared Motion City Soundtrack to its fans."

Alternative Press gave the album 3/5 and was dismayed by it being too much of the same, saying "Much of the disc is business as usual." Andy Greenwald of Blender rated the album 3/5 also. "Every generation needs a Weezer... and Motion City Soundtrack is the Weezer of emo." He was indifferent when it came to scrutinising Pierre, saying he "is a savvy melodic songwriter and, refreshingly, he's completely incapable of taking himself seriously," noting an unusual lyric from the "bouncy standout 'It Had to Be You.'" PopMatters reviewer Colin McGuire alluded numerous times to the simplicity the band exhibits that makes them appealing: "it's their honestly simple lyrics that make Minneapolis's most interesting five-piece so attractive," and "It's no secret that it's MCS's inconsolably simplistic wit that has made them cult heroes." He rated the album 6/10; summing up in saying the "album has proven its loyalty to the sound that gained Motion City Soundtrack its legion of fans—colorful pop-punk led by a guy with tremendous hair singing about his heart being broken."

== Track listing ==
All tracks are written by Motion City Soundtrack.

No.	Title	Length
1.	"Fell in Love Without You"	2:31
2.	"This Is for Real"	3:10
3.	"It Had to Be You"	3:48
4.	"Last Night"	3:17
5.	"Calling All Cops"	3:24
6.	"Can't Finish What You Started"	3:56
7.	"The Conversation"	2:50
8.	"Broken Heart"	3:01
9.	"Hello Helicopter"	4:23
10.	"Where I Belong"	3:23
11.	"Point of Extinction"	2:39
12.	"Antonia"	3:16
13.	"Even if It Kills Me"	3:51

B-sides
No.	Title	Length
1.	"Not Asking You to Leave" (Japanese bonus track)	3:50
2.	"The Worst Part" (Sound of Superman soundtrack)	4:17
3.	"Plymouth Rock" (B-side on the UK version of the "This Is for Real" single)	0:53
4.	"Broken Heart" (acoustic; featuring Korin Louise Cox)	3:11

iTunes Acoustic EP
No.	Title	Length
1.	"Fell in Love Without You"	3:25
2.	"It Had to Be You"	3:40
3.	"Broken Heart"	3:16
4.	"Can't Finish What You Started"	3:22
5.	"Point of Extinction"	2:52

- Tracks 1, 3, 6, 9–12 produced by Adam Schlesinger & Eli Janney.
- Tracks 2, 4, 5, 8 and 13 produced by Ric Ocasek.
- Track 7 produced by Motion City Soundtrack.
- Some copies of the album incorrectly read "Fell In Love Without You" as "Fell In Love With You".

== Personnel ==
Band

- Joshua Cain — guitars, backing vocals
- Jesse Johnson — Moog, keyboards, glockenspiel, backing vocals
- Justin Pierre — lead vocals, guitars, keyboards
- Matt Taylor — bass guitar, backing vocals, keyboards, piano
- Tony Thaxton — drums, percussion, backing vocals

Additional musicians

- Max Bemis — additional vocals (tracks 9, 11)
- Shawn Harris — additional vocals (tracks 9, 11)
- Eli Janney — strings arrangement (track 9)
- Rachel Minton — additional vocals (tracks 3, 9, 11)
- Ric Ocasek — additional keyboards (track 5)
- Adam Schlesinger — piano (track 3)

Production

- Arjun Agerwala — engineer (track 7), additional engineering (tracks 1, 3, 6, 9–12)
- Tom Baker — mastering
- Rudyard Lee Cullers — additional engineering (tracks 1, 3, 6, 9–12)
- Chuck Gladfelter – additional engineering (track 5)
- Femio Hernández — assistant mix engineer (tracks 1–6, 8–13)
- John Holbrook — additional engineering (tracks 1, 3, 6, 9–12)
- Tom Lord-Alge — mixing (tracks 1–6, 8–13)
- Dror Mohar – assistant engineer (tracks 2, 4, 5, 8, 13)
- Geoff Sanoff — engineer (tracks 1, 3, 6, 7, 9–12)
- Chris Shaw — engineer (tracks 2, 4, 5, 8, 13), mixing (track 7)
- Michael Trepagnier — assistant engineer (tracks 2, 4, 5, 8, 13)

Design

- Nick Pritchard — art direction, design
- Bryan Sheffield — photography
- James Thornton — band photography

== Charts ==
=== Weekly charts ===
Weekly chart performance
Chart (2007)	Peak position
Australian Albums (ARIA)	52
Canadian Albums (Nielsen SoundScan)	86
UK Albums (Official Charts)	113
UK Independent Albums (Official Charts)	6
US Billboard 200	16
US Independent Albums (Billboard)	1
US Top Alternative Albums (Billboard)	5
US Top Rock Albums (Billboard)	5

=== Year-end charts ===
Year-end chart performance
Chart (2007)	Position
US Independent Albums (Billboard)	48
