= Teles (surname) =

Teles is a surname. Notable people with the surname include:

- Amelinha Teles, Brazilian journalist, writer, and human writes activist
- André Teles (born 1997), Portuguese football midfielder
- Antônio Teles (born 1982), Brazilian football midfielder
- Antônio de Queirós Teles, Brazilian politician
- Basílio Teles, Portuguese author
- Bruno Teles (born 1986), Brazilian football left back
- Cláudia Teles (born 1992), Brazilian rugby sevens player
- David Teles (born 1998), Portuguese football midfielder
- Deisy and Sarah Teles (both born 1983), Brazilian-born identical twin pair that appeared as Playboy Playmates of the Month for December 2003
- Filipe Teles, political scientist at the University of Aveiro
- Geferson Cerqueira Teles (born 1994), Brazilian football defensive midfielder
- Gilberto Mendonça Teles, Brazilian writer
- Iago Teles (born 2000), Brazilian football forward
- José da Câmara Teles, member of the House of Camara
- José Homem Correia Teles, Portuguese jurist, judge, and politician
- Karine Teles, Brazilian actress, screenwriter, and filmmaker
- Leomir Silva Teles (born 1989), Brazilian football striker
- Leonor Teles, queen consort of Portugal
- Márcio Teles (born 1994), Brazilian hurdles runner
- Paulo Teles (born 1993), Portuguese football central midfielder
- Ralf de Souza Teles (born 1984), Brazilian football defensive midfielder
- Ruan Teles (born 1997), Brazilian football forward
- Sebastião Teles, Portuguese politician and military officer
- Steven Teles, American political scientist
- Tasya Teles, Canadian actress
