= 17 Again (film) =

2009 film by Burr Steers

- Theatrical release poster
- Directed by: Burr Steers
- Written by: Jason Filardi
- Produced by: Jennifer Gibgot; Adam Shankman
- Starring: Zac Efron; Leslie Mann; Thomas Lennon; Michelle Trachtenberg; Matthew Perry
- Cinematography: Tim Suhrstedt
- Edited by: Padraic McKinley
- Music by: Rolfe Kent
- Production companies: New Line Cinema; Offspring Entertainment
- Distributed by: Warner Bros. Pictures
- Release date: April 17, 2009
- Running time: 102 minutes
- Country: United States
- Language: English
- Budget: $40 million
- Box office: $139.5 million

17 Again is a 2009 American teen fantasy comedy film directed by Burr Steers and written by Jason Filardi. It stars Zac Efron, Leslie Mann, Thomas Lennon, and Michelle Trachtenberg, with Melora Hardin, Sterling Knight, and Matthew Perry in supporting roles. The film follows a 37-year-old man (Perry) who becomes his 17-year-old self (Efron) after a chance accident.

The film was released in the United States by Warner Bros. Pictures on April 17, 2009, to mixed reviews from critics, and was a box-office success, grossing $139.5 million on a $40 million budget.

== Plot ==
In 1989, 17-year-old star basketball player Mike O'Donnell finds out that his girlfriend, Scarlet Porter, is pregnant. She tells him about her pregnancy moments before his likely scholarship-clinching high-school championship basketball game. Mike plays the first few seconds of the game before walking off the court to go after Scarlet, abandoning his hopes of going to college and eventually having a professional basketball career.

Years later, Mike, now in his thirties, finds his life stagnant and boring, and Scarlet has filed for divorce. He moves in with his life-long best friend Ned Gold, who is wealthy, geeky, and also unhappy. After being passed over for a promotion at work he believed he deserved, Mike smashes his boss's earpiece, resulting in him being fired. His high school-age children, 18-year-old Maggie and 16-year-old Alex, want nothing to do with him.

Mike revisits the high school's memorabilia case, finding his senior year team photo. A janitor comes by, and he vents about his life, admitting he'd wish for a do-over. Later that night, while driving in the rain, Mike comes across the janitor on a bridge who suddenly falls into the water. While attempting to look for him, Mike falls in himself, and resurfaces as his 17-year-old self.

When he finally believes Mike is who he says he is, Ned theorizes that his magical transformation was caused by a mystical spirit guide who is trying to steer him on a better path. Mike enrolls in high school by posing as Mark Gold, Ned's son. He plans to go to college on a basketball scholarship.

As Mike befriends his own son, Alex, he discovers that he is being bullied. Mike also learns that his daughter Maggie has a boyfriend named Stan, who does not respect her and frequently torments Alex. Mike comes to believe that his mission is to help his children.

Through their children, Mike spends time with Scarlet, who notes his remarkable resemblance to Mike in high school, but rationalizes it as an odd coincidence. Attempting to fix his relationship with Scarlet, Mike begins to finish all the garden projects he had abandoned as an adult. He does his best to separate Stan and Maggie while encouraging Alex to be more confident. Mike has difficulty resisting his desire for Scarlet despite the relationship's clear inappropriateness.

Mike throws a party to celebrate a basketball game win at Ned's house. He confronts Stan, who has recently dumped Maggie for refusing to have sex with him. Mike gets knocked out by Stan and after Mike wakes up, he sees that Maggie is trying to seduce him. He tells her he is in love with someone else and Maggie leaves, much to Mike's relief.

Scarlet arrives at the party, and Mike shows her that Alex has finally managed to get together with his crush. The two have an intimate conversation where Mike, caught up in the moment, starts to kiss Scarlet. Disgusted, she storms off as he tries unsuccessfully to explain his true identity.

On the day of the court hearing to finalize the divorce, Mike makes one last attempt to win Scarlet back (as Mark) by emotionally reading a supposed letter from Mike. After he exits, Scarlet postpones the divorce by a month. She is then shocked to discover that the "letter" was actually just directions to the courtroom.

Frustrated that he could not save his marriage, Mike decides to once again pursue a scholarship and move on with his new life. During a basketball game, Scarlet has flashbacks to high school and finally realizes Mark's true identity – her estranged husband, Mike. She runs away, and Mike abandons the game to chase her down – just like he did in 1989 – thus also abandoning his chance at a new life as a basketball star. Mike transforms back into his 37-year-old self, happily reunites and reconciles with Scarlet, and realizes that she is the best decision he ever made.

As Mike prepares for his first day as the new basketball coach at his kids' school, Ned—who has successfully started a relationship with Jane, the principal—gifts him a whistle. Both are happy with the fresh starts in their lives.

== Cast ==
- Matthew Perry / Zac Efron as Mike O'Donnell / Mark Gold. Perry portrays Mike at age 37, while Efron portrays Mike at age 17 in the opening flashback from 1989 and after Mike has undergone his magical transformation into posing as Mark Gold, son of his friend Ned.
- Leslie Mann as Scarlet Porter O'Donnell, Mike's soon-to-be former wife and the mother of his children.
  - Allison Miller as young Scarlet
- Thomas Lennon as Ned Gold, Mike's best friend and a tech millionaire.
  - Tyler Steelman as young Ned
- Michelle Trachtenberg as Maggie O'Donnell, Mike and Scarlet's 18-year-old daughter. Her conception was the reason Mike chose to abandon his dreams and marry Scarlet. She is dating Stan.
- Melora Hardin as Principal Jane Masterson, the principal of the high school all characters attend or attended. She is also Ned's love interest.
- Sterling Knight as Alex O'Donnell, Mike and Scarlet's 16-year-old son. He is bullied by other students, especially Stan.
- Hunter Parrish as Stan, Maggie's boyfriend. He's nice to everyone except Alex, whom he bullies even in his house.
- Nicole Sullivan as Naomi, Scarlet's best friend.
- Kat Graham, Tiya Sircar and Melissa Ordway as Jamie, Samantha, and Lauren, the three girls who are friends with Maggie, and constantly trying to flirt with "Mark".
- Brian Doyle-Murray as Janitor, the magical spirit guide who makes the transformation possible.
- Josie Loren as Nicole, the head cheerleader and Alex's crush.
- Jim Gaffigan as Coach Murphy, the high school basketball coach, who has been there for 20 years.
- Margaret Cho as Mrs. Dell, a teacher.

== Reception ==
=== Critical response ===
On Rotten Tomatoes the film has an approval rating of 57% based on 148 reviews, with an average rating of 5.4/10. The site's critics consensus reads, "Though it uses a well-worn formula, 17 Again has just enough Zac Efron charm to result in a harmless, pleasurable teen comedy." On Metacritic, the film has a weighted average score of 48 out of 100, based on reviews from 27 critics, indicating "mixed or average" reviews. Audiences polled by CinemaScore gave the film an average grade of "A−" on an A+ to F scale.

Roger Ebert gave the film 3 stars out of 4, writing: "17 Again is pleasant, harmless PG-13 entertainment, with a plot a little more surprising and acting a little better than I expected." Justin Chang of Variety wrote: "Zac Efron's squeaky-clean tweener-bait profile is unlikely to be threatened by 17 Again, an energetic but earthbound comic fantasy that borrows a few moves, if little inspiration, from Big and It's a Wonderful Life."

=== Box office ===
The film was projected to take in around $20 million in its opening weekend. Opening in 3,255 theaters in the United States and Canada, the film grossed $23.7 million, ranking #1 at the box office, with 70% of the audience consisting of young women. By the end of its run, 17 Again grossed $64.2 million in North America and $72.1–75.3 million internationally, totaling $136.3–139.5 million worldwide.

== Soundtrack ==
17 Again: Original Motion Picture Soundtrack was released on April 21, 2009, by New Line Records.

=== Track listing ===
1. "On My Own" by Vincent Vincent and the Villains
2. "Can't Say No" by The Helio Sequence
3. "L.E.S. Artistes" by Santigold
4. "Naïve" by The Kooks
5. "This Is Love" by Toby Lightman
6. "You Really Wake Up the Love in Me" by The Duke Spirit
7. "The Greatest" by Cat Power
8. "Rich Girls" by The Virgins
9. "This Is for Real" by Motion City Soundtrack
10. "Drop" by Ying Yang Twins
11. "Cherish" by Kool & the Gang
12. "Bust a Move" by Young MC
13. "Danger Zone" by Kenny Loggins

=== Additional music credits ===
- "Kid (Acoustic Version)" by The Pretenders
- "Nookie" by Limp Bizkit
- "The Underdog" by Spoon
- "High School Never Ends" by Bowling for Soup (Used in movie trailer/commercial)
- "Push It Fergasonic (DJ Axel Mashup)" by Fergie, Salt-n-Pepa, JJ Fad

The orchestral score was written by Rolfe Kent and orchestrated by Tony Blondal. It was recorded at Skywalker Sound.

== Adaptation ==
A South Korean television series titled 18 Again based on the film aired on JTBC from September 21 to November 10, 2020.

There is also a musical adaptation of 17 Again, with a studio cast recording made in 2023.

== See also ==
- Big, 1988 comedy drama film about a boy who becomes a full-grown man
- Young Again, 1986 Canadian made-for-television film starring Keanu Reeves about a 40-year-old man who becomes 17 years old again in order to reunite with his high school girlfriend. Originally broadcast as part of the Disney Sunday Movie series.
- Back to the Future, 1985 a film about a son who time travels to when his parents were in high school
- A Distant Neighborhood, a 1990s Japanese manga about an adult re-living his teenage life
- The Kid, 2000 American fantasy comedy-drama about a grown man who encounters his younger self
- Seventeen Again, 2000 American fantasy–comedy film about two grandparents who are turned 17 years old
- Freaky Friday, 2003 American fantasy-comedy film about a mother and daughter switching bodies, the daughter experiences the hardship of adulthood, while the mother experiences the difficulty of what is like being a teenager again
- 13 Going on 30, 2004 American romantic comedy film about a 13-year-old girl who suddenly turns 30
- Mr. Destiny, 1990 American comedy film with similar plot
- Miss Granny, 2014 South Korean film about woman in her 70s who magically finds herself in the body of her 20-year-old self after having her picture taken at a mysterious photo studio
- The Poof Point, 2001 American science-fiction comedy film about two scientist parents who accidentally regress their age during an experiment
- Mrs. Doubtfire, 1993 American comedy film about a father who disguises himself to get closer to his estranged family
- Little, 2019 American comedy film about an evil boss who becomes a little girl
- 18 Again!, 1988 American comedy film about an 81-year-old man George Burns who switches bodies with his 18-year-old grandson
