= University of Aveiro =

Public polytechnic university in Aveiro, Portugal

Coordinates: 40.6303°N 8.6575°W

- Universidade de Aveiro
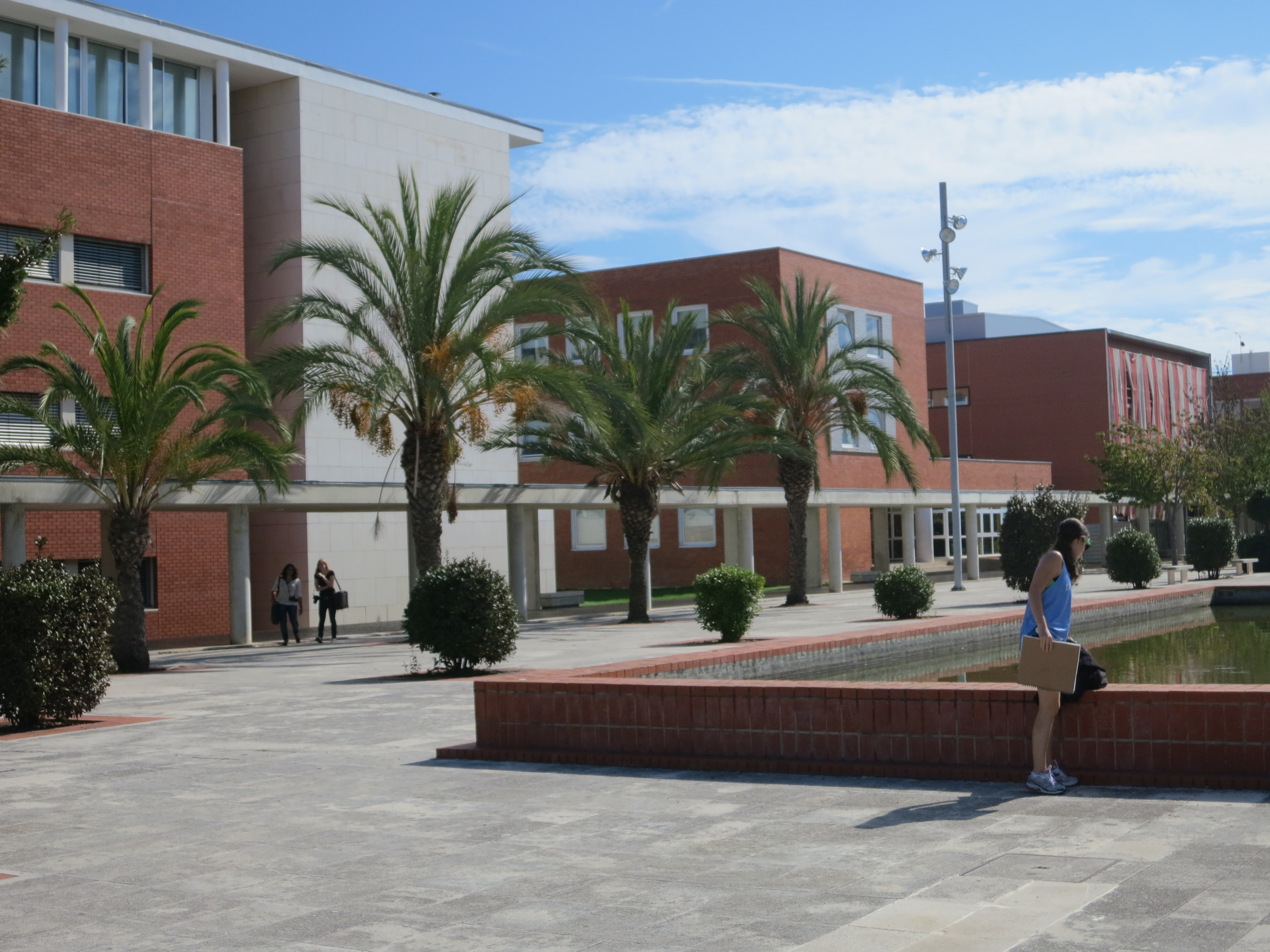
- Motto: Theoria, Poiesis, Praxis
- Type: Public University
- Established: 1973
- Affiliations: Campus Europae, EUA, ECIU, ESDP-Network, UNIMED
- Rector: Artur Manuel Soares da Silva
- Administrative staff: 927
- Students: 14,280 (2018)
- Postgraduates: 2,718
- Location: Aveiro, Portugal
- Campus: Urban, 92 hectares (227.3 acres)
- Colours: White and green
- Website: www.ua.pt

The University of Aveiro (Portuguese: Universidade de Aveiro) is a public university, in addition to providing polytechnic education, located in the Portuguese city of Aveiro. Founded in 1973, it has a student population of approximately 12,500, distributed among 58 graduate, 40 Masters of Science and 25 PhD programs, distributed by departments and autonomous sections, with specialized faculties. It is a Research & Development university, with research departments developing programmes in fundamental and applied mathematics, physics, chemistry, telecommunications, robotics, bioinformatics, sea sciences, materials, design, business administration and industrial engineering.

The main campus and nearby Administration and Accounting Institute, are located in the city centre of Aveiro. There are external/regional campuses in Águeda (Higher Education Technological and Management School of Águeda) and Oliveira de Azeméis (Higher Education School of North Aveiro). It serves as a pole for the inter-university Doctoral program, along with the universities of Porto and Minho. Its integrated Masters in Electronics and Telecommunications Engineering was the first Portuguese IT oriented European Accredited Engineering Masters (EUR-ACE) by the European Network for Accreditation of Engineering Education.

== History ==
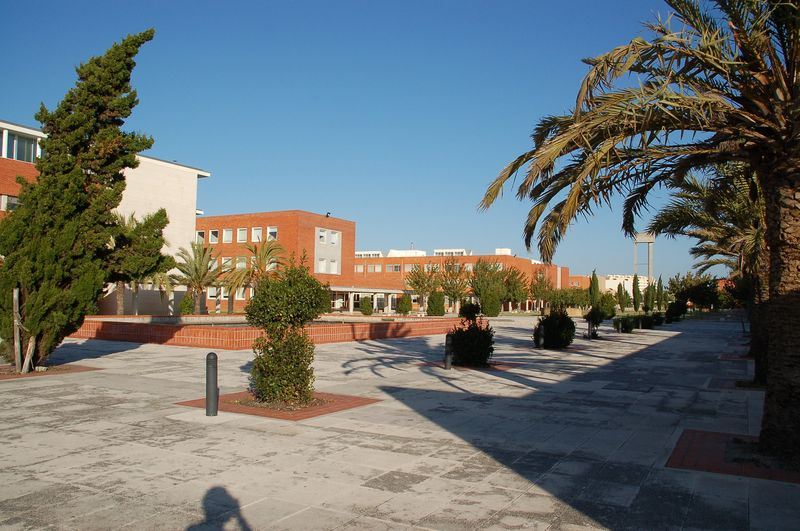
The main concourse between department blocks at the main campus

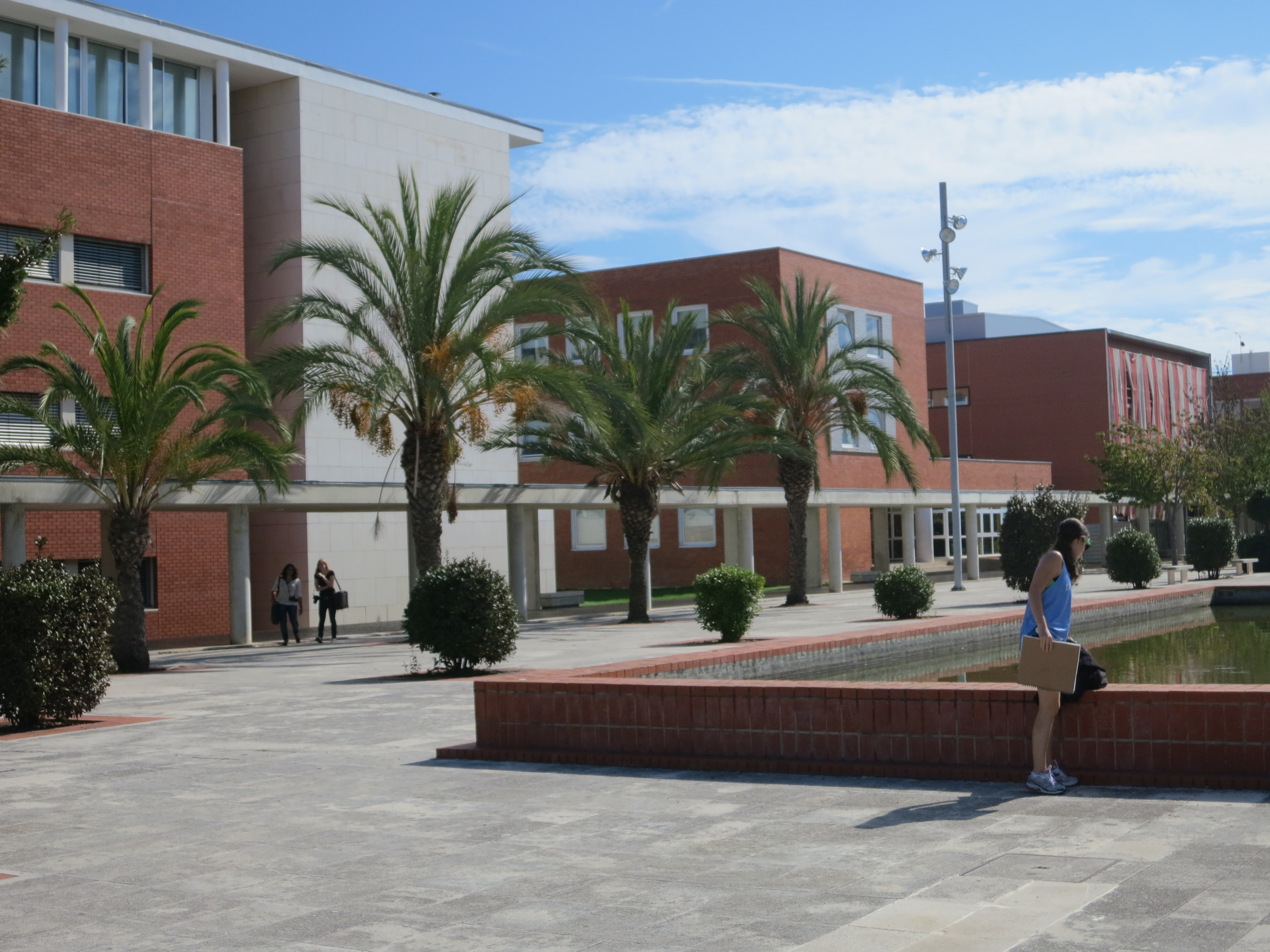
The University of Aveiro central campus area with colonnades and department buildings.

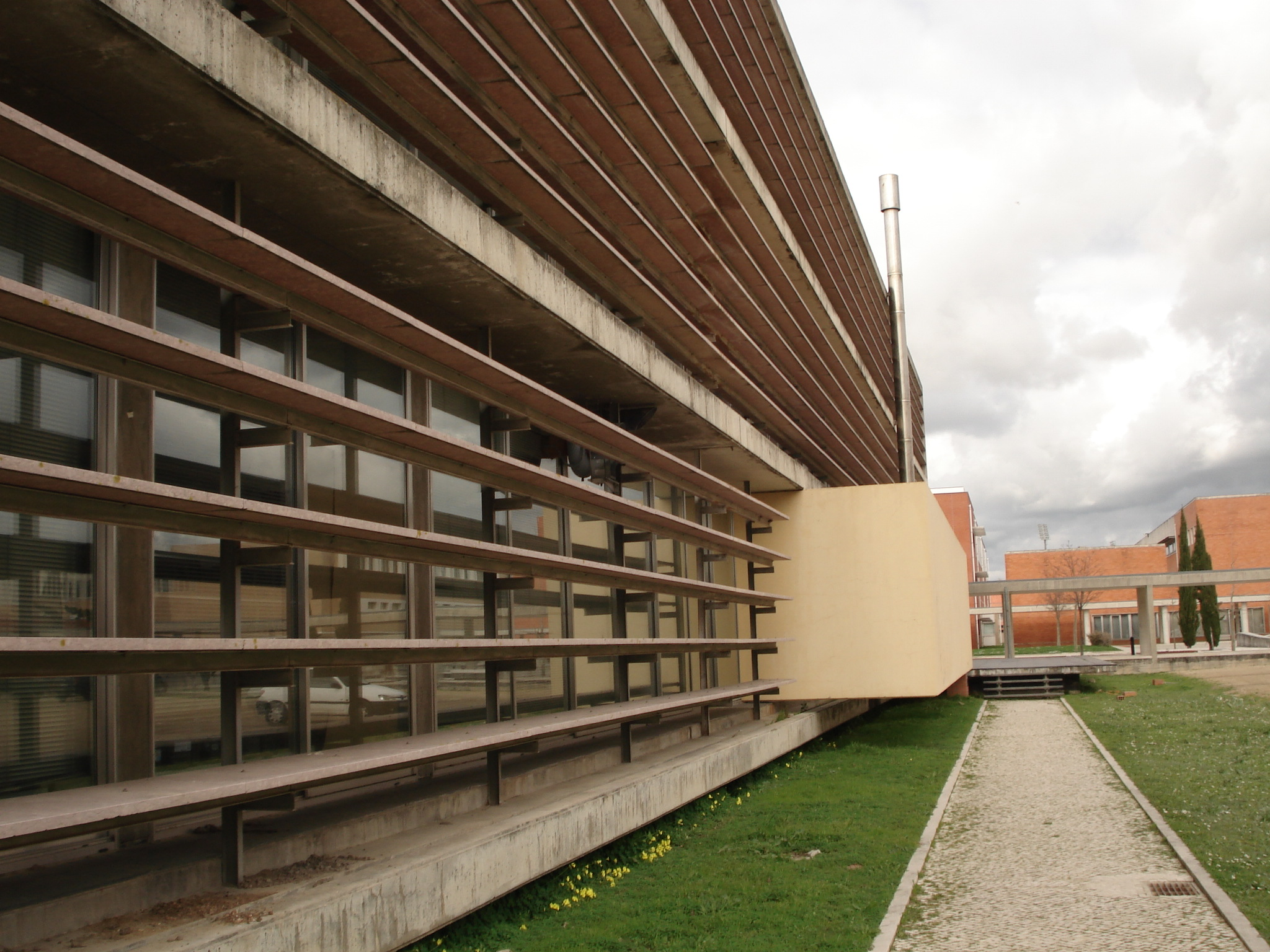
The Geosciences department at the university

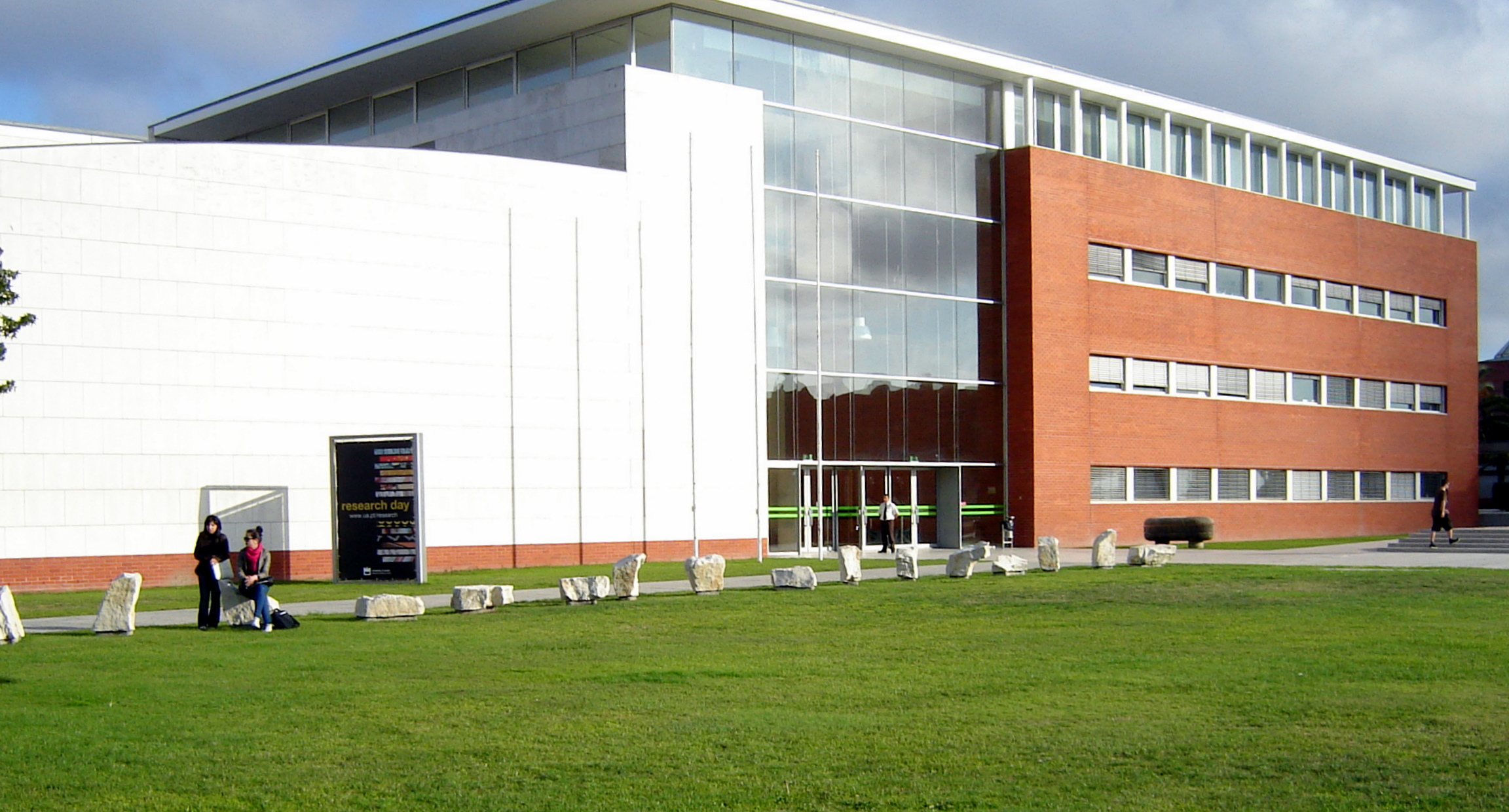
The rectory building at the university

University rankings

Global – Overall
- ARWU World: 401–500 (2023)
- QS World: 419 (2026)
- THE World: 601–800 (2024)
- USNWR Global: 525 (2023)

On 15 December 1973, at the inaugural speech of Professor José Veiga Simão, then Minister of National Education (Portuguese: Ministro da Educação Nacional) the new rector, stated:

"In the peaceful construction of the future and in defense of sacred and enduring values, here will rise the University of Aveiro.

Announced in a speech at the Museum of Aveiro, the event was held to mark the first meeting of the commission establishing the University of Aveiro, that included José Simão and other members of academic society and Aveiro. The first pedagogical and scientific activities began in 1974, with first days classes in the telecommunication course, comprising 46 students.

The licentiate courses established at the University of Aveiro (UA) were the first courses in innovative areas, that were not explored by traditional universities at the time in Portugal, but important to regional or national initiatives. By 1976 there were courses in environmental science and education, natural sciences and education, mathematics and education, Portuguese-English and education and Portuguese-French and education. The student population included 338. It was only in that year that the first infrastructure were established in the area later known as the University Campus of Santigao (Portuguese: Campus Universitário de Santiago).

During the 1977–1978 lecture year, there was a proposal to create a pilot project: the first Centro Integrado de Formação de Professores (CIFOP), today the Integrated Unit for Continuing Education (Portuguese: Unidade Integrada de Formação Continuada, UINFOC), in the country. At UA, the intention was to establish a training institute for professors/teachers, from infant education to secondary school, using the latest pedagogical resources and innovative methods. The project was headed by Professor João Evangelista Loureiro, the former vice-rector at UA.

A period of consolidation occurred at the university in the 1980s, resulting in internal regulation and the creation of fundamental bodies (during the mandate of the second rector Dr. José Mesquita Rodrigues) as well as the conclusion of the purchase of lands for the campus, later completed during the mandate of Dr. Renato Araújo. By the end of the 1980s (specifically 24 September 1988), the law for university autonomy, permitted the consolidation of the university organic laws, and homologation of the university statutes, in June 1989. Meanwhile, a team coordinated by architect Nuno Portas, had begun selecting among various prestigious Portuguese architects in 1986 to design the Santigao University Campus, that fell in line with their attempt to harmonize the structures with the architectural heritage of the city. Many of the buildings, therefore, were designed by internationally recognized architects, among them: Alcino Soutinho, Álvaro Sisa Vieira, Pedro Ramalho, Luís Ramalho, José Maria Lopo Prata, Eduardo Souto Moura, Adalberto Dias, Rebello de Andrade, Jorge Kol de Carvalho, Gonçalo Byrne and Figueiredo Dias, whose works have annually been visited by national and international specialists. By the mid-1980s teaching had expanded with innovative courses in Environment, Industrial Management, Music, Tourism, Chemical Industry and New Technologies.

The 1990s was marked by a new phase at UA, with priorities redefined to position the university towards internationalization and cooperation, namely European programs, reinforcing relationships with Portuguese-speaking and Latin states, and building protocols between international institutes, organs and companies abroad. In parallel there were initiatives in continuing education, distance learning and improving student satisfaction and quality. In 1994, an Internet search engine, SAPO, was created in this university. Since 1998, the university has been developing an ecological motor vehicle, Ícaro, aiming to run the largest distance with the smallest amount of consumed fuel, having participated in the international competition Shell Eco-marathon.

During the second mandate of the fourth rector, Dr. Júlio Pedrosa, the student population was 8000, and the university had the most number of internationally recognized programs. During 25th anniversary celebrations, UA advanced with the integration of polytechnical study into early training programs. The creation of the Escola Superior de Tecnologia e Gestão de Águeda (in 1997), the integration of the Instituto de Contabilidade e Administração de Aveiro (in 1999), the implementation of the Escola Superior de Saúde (in 2000), and the implementation of a polytechnical school in the northern district, the Escola Superior Aveiro-Norte], was part of this process of integration. In 2012–13, it was ranked 351–400 in the Times Higher Education World University rankings. Rankings

The first mandate of its sixth rector, Dr. Maria Helena Nazaré, was marked by the start of professional program in technology (2002–2003). Since 2009, it has hosted a SexLab aimed at studying sexual health.

In February 2010 Professor Manuel António de Assunção took charge as the seventh rector, a position held for two mandates until May 2018. During this time he promoted the establishment of the Fábrica – Centro de Ciência Viva de Aveiro.

On 8 May 2018 Paulo Jorge Ferreira took office as the eight rector.

On 20 May 2026 Artur Manuel Soares da Silva took office as the ninth rector.

== Culture ==
The university hosts 3810-UA, a weekly national public television program.

In mid-spring, a one-week break from formal studies is allowed, wherein anyone may participate in academic activities, concerts or Enterro do Ano, a local academic parade.

The university is a regular participant or organizer of robotics inter-university or inter-school competitions, i.e.: Micro-Rato (hardware robotics) and Cyber-Rato (behavioral software). In 2008, one of its teams won the Robocup world competition, in China.

The university occasionally organizes mathematics competitions, mostly aimed at pre-university level students.

== University Campus Santiago ==
The university architecture is modern, with more than 25 buildings.

As an organization, the university is composed of departments (one of them built by Eduardo Souto de Moura), autonomous sections, research units, administrative and service facilities, a library (built by Álvaro Siza), a mediateque, a field track, a multisports building with gym, a residential complex, green spaces, ecological spots and parking lots. The rectory (built by Gonçalo Byrne) is located in a white building near the campus centre.

The campus also has an entire Administration and Accounting Institute, which has its own service facilities and parking lots.

== Research ==
The projects developed by UA are developed under 20 research centres, of many different scientific areas:

1. Centre for Environmental and Marine Studies (CESAM)
2. Center for Research in Higher Education Policies (CIPES)
3. Aveiro Research Centre of Risks and Sustainability in Construction (RISCO)
4. Research Centre for Didactics and Technology in Teacher Education (CIDTFF)
5. Centre of Research and Development in Mathematics and Applications (CIDMA)
6. Digital Media and Interaction (DigiMedia)
7. Center for Health technology and Services Research (CINTESIS)
8. William James Research Center (WJCR)
9. Centre for Languages, Literature and Cultures (CLLC)
10. Centre for Mechanical Technology and Automation (TEMA)
11. GeoBioSciences, GeoTechnologies and GeoEngineering (GEOBIOTEC)
12. Institute of Telecommunications (IT)
13. Institute of Biomedicine of Aveiro (IBIMED)
14. Institute of Electronics and Informatics Engineering of Aveiro (IEETA)
15. Institute of Ethnomusicology - Centre of Music and Dance Studies (INET-Md)
16. Research Institute for Design, Media and Culture (ID+)
17. Aveiro Institute of Materials (CICECO)
18. Institute for Nanostructures, Nanomodelling and Nanofabrication - Physics of Semicondutors, Optoelectronics and Disordered Systems (I3N-FSCOSD)
19. REQUIMTE – Network of Chemistry and Technology
20. Governance, Competitiveness and Public Policies (GOVCOPP)

As a research-led institution, during 2015, 316 research and technology transfer projects were active in UA. 80 of these projects are/were funded by International and European Programmes, of which 27 by the 7th Framework Programme, 13 by the Horizon 2020 and 17 by the ERASMUS +.

== Faculty and alumni ==
- Catarina Fagundes, windsurfer at 1996 Summer Olympics
- Jacinta, jazz singer
- José Carlos Pedro, researcher at IT, professor, IEEE Fellow
- Filipe Teles, political scientist
- Miguel Viegas, Member of the European Parliament
- Eduardo Marçal Grilo, mechanical engineer and politician
- Delfim F. M. Torres, professor, CIDMA Director
- Nuno Borges De Carvalho, professor, IEEE Fellow
- Miguel Monteiro, Paralympic bronze medal winner and former world recordist of longest shot put throw

== See also ==
- ECIU
- EUA
- IEEE
- ESDP-Network
- List of universities in Portugal
- Higher education in Portugal
