= José Carlos Pedro =

José Carlos Pedro is a researcher and scientist in the areas of wireless communication and microwave engineering. He has been awarded for his contributions several times. In 2007, he became a Fellow of the Institute of Electrical and Electronics Engineers, for his outstanding contributions to distortion analysis. He is a full Professor of the University of Aveiro. He involved in many projects in the IT(Institute of Telecommunications, Aveiro), of which he became the President of the Board of Directors, in 2021. He is a speaker of scientific topics and research methods.
