= Catarina Fagundes =

Portuguese windsurfer (born 1977)

Catarina Fagundes (born 8 April 1977 in Funchal, Madeira) is a Portuguese sailor. She competed in the Mistral Windsurf Class at the 1996 Summer Olympics in Atlanta, Georgia, and achieved the 21st position. She was the first Portuguese female athlete to enter an Olympic event in a sailing class.

Graduated by University of Aveiro for Tourism Planning and Management.

At present she is a business entrepreneur, ornithologist and windsurfing coach in Madeira, Portugal. CEO of Wind Birds.
