= Tele =

Tele may refer to:

== People ==
- Tele (footballer) (born 1990), Brazilian footballer
- Tele Ikuru, (born 1966), Nigerian politician
- Tele Samad (1945–2019), Bangladeshi actor
- Telê Santana (1931–2006), Brazilian football manager
- Tiele people, an ancient Turkic tribal confederation

== Places ==
- Télé, Mali, a rural commune of the Cercle of Goundam in the Tombouctou Region of Mali
- Lake Tele, Republic of the Congo
- Tele River, a tributary of the Oranje River

== Other uses ==
- Television
- Tele (band), a German rock/pop band
- Telemarketing
- Telegraphy
- Evening Telegraph (Dundee), a local newspaper in Dundee, Scotland
- Fender Telecaster, a guitar
- Telemark skiing, a style of skiing

== See also ==
- Telly
