= Everything Is Alright =

Single by Motion City Soundtrack

from the album Commit This to Memory
- Released: 2005
- Recorded: October–November 2004; Seedy Underbelly Studios (Valley Village, California)
- Genre: Emo; pop punk; indie rock
- Length: 3:27
- Label: Epitaph
- Songwriters: Joshua Cain, Jesse Johnson, Matthew Taylor, Tony Thaxton, Justin Pierre
- Producer: Mark Hoppus

Motion City Soundtrack singles chronology
"My Favorite Accident" (2003)	"Everything Is Alright" (2005)	"Hold Me Down" (2006)

"Everything Is Alright" is a song by American rock band Motion City Soundtrack, released in 2005 as the lead single from the group's second studio album, Commit This to Memory (2005). The song concerns neurotic, obsessive problems and social anxiety, and was written by frontman Justin Pierre. The song also contains backing vocals from Fall Out Boy frontman Patrick Stump. It was featured on the soundtracks of the 2005 film Bad News Bears, and the 2006 video games MLB 06: The Show and Saints Row.

The song is generally considered the band's signature song, and has been played at live performances since its inception. A music video for the single was released in 2005. On October 31, 2017, "Everything Is Alright" was certified gold by the Recording Industry Association of America (RIAA), denoting sales of over 500,000 units.

== Background ==
Motion City Soundtrack frontman Justin Pierre penned the song as a summary of his OCD (Obsessive–compulsive disorder) tendencies. He intended to utilize his social anxiety and fears in the song's form, which he has since employed in numerous other compositions. "I don't think the [phrase] "tongue-in-cheek" is correct, but it's something where the verses are one thing and then the chorus is another, but it's sort of like giving yourself a pep talk," said Pierre. The song's lyrics include hating such mundane things as "the ocean, theme parks, and airplanes, talking with strangers, waiting in line," things that Pierre genuinely disliked at the time of the song's writing. Incorporating his deepest feelings into the song was inspired by advice given by a screenwriting professor during his tenure at the Minneapolis Community Technical College in the mid-1990s. He instructed the students, who were "trying to make Pulp Fiction II or Goodfellas II," to simply write what they know; Pierre took the advice literally and began writing autobiographical screenplays that feature protagonists with asthma, unable to talk to women.

You kind of have to look at yourself in the mirror and repeat the words to yourself until one day, eventually, you're okay.

— Justin Pierre

The song was one of the last written for Commit This to Memory, when the band arrived in Los Angeles in the winter of 2004–05. The song was recorded largely at Seedy Underbelly Studios, a suburban home converted into a studio in the city's Valley Village region. Pierre's most prominent memory of recording the song, told to Alternative Press writer Jason Pettigrew in 2013, was a moment in which he attempted to impress a friend. He returned to the studio at one in the morning with the friend, where the band was still recording. The members were in the process of crafting the song's intro, which features "far away sounding" drums and guitar, and half of the song's chorus. "I said, 'Let's just do it right now. Play it and I’ll sing it in the middle of the room with the mic in the back room picking me up,'" recalled Pierre. "We did it in one take and I was really proud. I just know that I liked how "in-the-moment" that was and how scary it was. I knew that if I didn't nail it I would look like an idiot, but I came in real cocky. I think my friend was impressed a little bit."

== Reception ==
"Everything Is Alright" is generally considered the band's signature song. In 2013, Alternative Press wrote that the song combines "caffeinated pop hooks, synthesizers and loud guitars […] into a gloriously neurotic, yet completely life-affirming pop song." The magazine lists in a feature chronicling what they deem "the [pop punk/emo] scene's most resonant songs." MTV News writer James Montgomery compared the song to the then-recently broken up Blink-182, "[The song] starts out with a Travis-Barker-esque cadence, picks up with some power chords, and then rides to a climax atop some sweet two-part harmony. It's kind of like Motion City Soundtrack are trying to pick up where Blink-182 left off."

Ashley Laderer from Paste praised its song and video. Variety's Angelique Jackson called it one of the best emo songs of all-time, observing that the worry-riddled track "has soothed many a fan who battles the same anxieties." In a large assessment from Cleveland's Plain Dealer, Troy L. Smith ranked it among the best pop-punk songs ever, stating that: "it sounds like a massive pop hit [...] When a genre goes mainstream, it can fall into complacency. But Motion City Soundtrack was still being inventive." Ryan Piers from Alternative Press suggested its frank discussion of anxiety was refreshing: "Contemporary bands never shy from the topic, but early 2000s groups seemed to concern themselves more with lost loves and escaping hometowns."

== Track listing ==
CD single (2005)

1. "Everything Is Alright" – 3:27

== Personnel ==
Motion City Soundtrack

- Justin Pierre – lead vocals, guitar
- Joshua Cain – guitar, vocals
- Jesse Johnson – Moog, keyboard
- Matt Taylor – bass guitar, percussion, piano, vocals
- Tony Thaxton – drums, vocals

Additional musicians

- Patrick Stump – backing vocals

== Charts ==
Chart (2006)	Peak position
US Bubbling Under Hot 100 (Billboard)	16

== Certifications ==
Region	Certification	Certified units/sales
United States (RIAA)	Gold	500,000^{‡}
^{‡} Sales+streaming figures based on certification alone.
