= Telly (company) =

American TV set manufacturing company

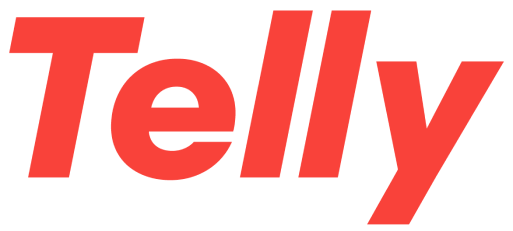
- Type: Private
- Industry: Television
- Founded: 2021
- Founder: Ilya Pozin
- Headquarters: Los Angeles, California, United States
- Key people: Ilya Pozin (CEO)
- Products: Smart Display
- Website: telly.com

Telly is a Los Angeles-based TV set manufacturing company. The Telly television set became available to the public in 2023 and is distributed for free to users in the United States. Telly was founded by Ilya Pozin in 2021. The TV set contains a secondary screen that displays soundless, unobtrusive advertisements. The large amount of commercials are reported to be in place to pay for the expenses of the free product.

== History ==
Telly was founded in May 2021 by Ilya Pozin who previously co-founded Pluto TV.

In May 2023, Telly initiated a waitlist and began distributing its ad-supported TVs to initial users in July.

Telly's investors include Rich Greenfield, a general partner at LightShed Ventures, and Gary Vaynerchuk's VaynerMedia.

== Features ==
Telly is a TV set that includes a 55-inch primary display, a secondary display called Smart Display that continuously shows ads, regardless of the main screen's content, and a soundbar located between the primary and secondary display. Smart Display also displays widgets such as sports scores, news tickers, weather updates, and prices of company shares.

Telly has a camera for video calls, a voice assistant, and built-in games. It also contains a sensor that measures viewer engagement, three HDMI inputs, two USB inputs, and a tuner for over-the-air broadcasts.

Telly runs on its own operating system, TellyOS, but is also compatible with other streaming devices like Roku, Amazon Fire Stick, and Apple TV.

Telly ads are actionable, and a user can buy products or services directly from the television.

== Controversy ==
Telly has faced scrutiny over privacy issues, as the secondary screen collects data on viewing habits and interactions with ads as well as number of people watching. Critics have argued that Telly's business model relies heavily on data collection, which may raise concerns about consumer privacy. In response, Telly has stated that it takes user privacy seriously and that all data collected is anonymized and used solely for improving the ad experience.
