= Filipe Teles =

Political scientist

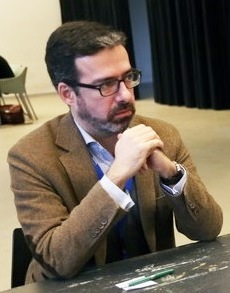
- Born: Portugal
- Scientific career
- Fields: Local government; Political science; Public policy
- Institutions: Department of Social, Political and Territorial Sciences, University of Aveiro
- Doctoral advisor: Gerry Stoker

Filipe Teles is a political scientist and associate professor in the Department of Social, Political and Territorial Sciences at the University of Aveiro, Portugal, where he teaches courses in the fields of public policy and political science. He is acting as prorector for regional development and urban policies at the university.

He holds a PhD in political science and is a member of the Research Unit on Governance, Competitiveness and Public Policy, where he has developed research work on governance and local government, territorial reform, political leadership and innovation. He participates in several national and international projects and is the author and co-author of several books and articles in international journals.

He is the president of the European Urban Research Association. Member of the Portuguese Association of Political Science, the Political Studies Association (UK), the International Political Science Association, and of the steering committee of the Local Government and Politics Standing Group (European Consortium for Political Research).

== Selected bibliography ==
=== Books ===
- Series Co-editor: "Palgrave Studies in Sub-National Governance"
- Teles, F.; Swianiewicz, P. (eds.) (2018), Inter-municipal Cooperation in Europe: Institutions and Governance, Palgrave. ISBN 978-3-319-62819-6
- Teles, Filipe (2016). Local governance and Inter-municipal Cooperation. Palgrave. ISBN 978-1137445735.
- Ramos, A.M.; Teles, F. (2012), Memória das Políticas Educativas em Timor-Leste: a Consolidação de um Sistema, Ed. Universidade de Aveiro
- Teles, F.; Pinto, L.C. (2009), Ser capaz de adquirir competências, Programa Escolhas, ACIDI: Lisboa

==== Forthcoming ====
- Hlepas, N.; Kersting, N.; Kuhlman, S.; Swianiewicz, P.; Teles, F. (2018). Sub-municipal Governance in Europe: Decentralization Beyond the Municipal Tier.

=== Book chapters ===
- Teles, F.; Swianiewicz, P. (2018), Motives for Revisiting Inter-municipal Cooperation, in Teles, F. and Swianiewicz, P. (eds.) (2018), Intermunicipal cooperation in Europe: Institutions and Governance, Palgrave
- Swianiewicz, P.; Teles, F. (2018), Inter-municipal Cooperation Diversity, Evolution and Future research Agenda, in Teles, F. and Swianiewicz, P. (eds.) (2018), Intermunicipal cooperation in Europe: Institutions and Governance, Palgrave
- Steen, T.; Teles, F.; Torsteinsen, H. (2017), "Improving Local Service Delivery: Increasing Performance Through Reforms", in Schwab, C., Bouckaert, G. & Kuhlmann, S. (eds.), The Future of Local Government in Europe: Lessons from Research and Practice in 31 Countries, Berlin:Nomos/Edition Sigma
- Kettunen, P, Teles, F, Navarro, C, Richter, P, Hlepas, N, et al. (2016) "Child day-care in transition: scaling and re-scaling in comparative perspective", in Geert Bouckaert and Sabine Kuhlmann (eds.) "Local Public Sector Reforms in Times of Crisis: National Trajectories and International Comparisons", Palgrave.
- Rodrigues, C.; Teles, F (2016), The fourth helix in Smart Specialization Strategies - the gap between discourse and practice, in Carayannis and Monteiro (eds.) The Quadruple Innovation Helix Nexus: A Smart Growth Model, Quantitative Empirical Validation and Operationalization for OECD Countries, Springer / Palgrave.
- Teles, F. e Kettunnen, P. (2016), " Why Municipal Cooperation Matters: Diversity and research agendas", in Ugur Sadioglu and Kadir Dede (eds.), " Theoretical Foundations and Discussions on the Reformation Process in Local Governments", IGI Global, Hershey PA, pp:140-152.
- Teles, F. (2016), "Gobierno Local en Portugal: Identidad y Transición", in José Manuel Ruano y Camilo Vial (eds.) Gobiernos Locales en Iberoamérica, CLAD.
- Teles, F. (2015) "Órgãos autárquicos: limitações e alternativas", in Sousa, L., Cruz, N., Tavares, A. e Jorge, S. (eds.) "A reforma do poder local em debate", ICS: Lisboa, pp:123-128.
- Teles, Filipe (2008), "Autarquias no Fio da Navalha: Governação Local e as Estratégias de Reforço do Capital Social", in J.M. Moreira, C. Jalali e A.A. Alves (Eds.), Estado, Sociedade Civil e Administração Pública: para um novo paradigma do serviço público, Almedina: Coimbra

==== Forthcoming ====
- Silva, P.; Teles, F. The biggest loser? Local Public Services under austerity measures in Portugal, in Lippi, A. & Tsekos, T. (eds.), Local Public Services in Times of Austerity across Mediterranean Europe
- Tavares, A.; Teles, F. (2018), Deeply rooted but still striving for a role: the Portuguese Freguesias under reform, in Hlepas, N., Kersting, N., Kuhlman, S, Swianiewicz, P. and Teles, F. (Eds.), Sub-municipal Governance in Europe: In search of expressive and responsive communities?
- Hlepas, N.; Kersting, N.; Kuhlmann, S.; Swianiewicz, P.; Teles, F. (2018) Introduction: Decentralization Beyond the Municipal Tier, in Hlepas, N., Kersting, N., Kuhlman, S, Swianiewicz, P. and Teles, F. (Eds.), Sub-municipal Governance in Europe: Decentralization Beyond the Municipal Tier, Palgrave

=== Articles ===
- Silva, P. Rosa Pires, A. e Teles, F (2016) "Paving the (hard) way for regional partnerships: evidences from Portugal", Regional and Federal Studies
- Teles, Filipe (2015), Ambiguity is the leader's new double edged sword, in Tony Middlebrooks (ed.) Symposium: Provoking Perspectives of Creativity and Innovation in Leadership, Journal of Leadership Studies, Volume 9, issue 3, 55-56
- Teles, Filipe (2015), Local Political Leaders and Context Awareness: identifying perceptions of autonomy and efficacy, Space and Polity (Published online: 06 Mar 2015), DOI: 10.1080/13562576.2015.1017227
- Teles, Filipe (2015), The distinctiveness of Democratic Political Leadership, Political Studies Review, 13 (1): 22-36 doi: 10.1111/1478-9302.12029 (pub online 11 oct 2013)
- Teles, Filipe (2014), Facilitative mayors in complex environments: why political will matters, Local Government Studies, 40(5): 809-829 DOI:10.1080/03003930.2013.801835
- Teles, Filipe (2014), Local Government and the Bailout: reform singularities in Portugal, European Urban and Regional Studies, DOI: 10.1177/0969776413517249 (pub online 27 jan 2014)
- Teles, Filipe (2013), Local Co-Governance: An exploratory study on third sector's artificial autonomy, Croatian and Comparative Public Administration, Vol.13(3): 783-802
- Teles, Filipe (2012), Effective Local Government Arrangements, Identity and Social Capital: a Framework for institutional design and administrative reform, Theoretical and Empirical Researches in Urban Management, Vol.7(4): 20-34
- Teles, Filipe (2012), Beyond Paternalism towards social capital: local governance reform in Portugal, International Journal of Public Administration, 35:13, 864-872
- Teles, Filipe (2012), Political leaders: the paradox of freedom and democracy, Revista Enfoques, Ciência Política y Administración Pública (Chile), Vol X, n.16, pp. 112–131

==== Forthcoming ====
- Silva, P.; Teles, F.; Ferreira, J. (2018), "Intermunicipal cooperation cooperation: the quest for governance capacity?", International Review of Administrative Sciences, Vol. 84 (4)

== Current Research Projects ==
- PI of CeNTER – Community-led Networks for Territorial Innovation Apr2017-Apr2020
- Quality of Local Governance, Mar2016-Mar2018
- Management Committee of Local public sector reforms: an international comparison – LocRef, COST Action IS1207, ISCH, COST-European Cooperation in Science and Technology (2013-2017)
