= Mahatat =

Mahatat, Inc.
- Formerly: TwitVid Inc., Telly Inc.
- Type: Private
- Industry: Entertainment
- Founded: 2009; 17 years ago
- Headquarters: Kuwait
- Areas served: Middle East and North Africa
- Key people: Nasser M. Al-Sabah (chairman); CW Kruger (CEO)
- Brands: Telly Plus (2012)
- Services: Video streaming, Video on demand
- Website: www.mahatat.com

Mahatat (formerly Telly, Inc. and Twitvid Inc.) is a Kuwait-based company that operates a video on demand platform and offers video streaming services in the Middle East and North Africa. The platform also features Bollywood films and locally produced content, TV shows and exclusive Original contents as well as Kuwaiti Short Films on their website.

== History ==
Mahatat Inc, formerly Telly, Inc and Twitvid Inc, was founded in 2009 in the United States. The company primarily serves Saudi Arabia, Bahrain, the United Arab Emirates, Kuwait, Qatar, Oman, Lebanon, Jordan, Egypt, Morocco, Algeria, Tunisia, Iraq, and Yemen with local presence and offices in Kuwait & Dubai.

After its launch in 2012, Mahatat made social recommendations for videos that a visitor's social contacts may have been watching. Mahatat claims to have had about 115 million views in February and has raised a cumulative of $20 million from different investors such as DFJ, Lumia Capital and Azure Capital with a majority stake by Cinemagics in Kuwait, one of the leading production companies in the region. With the knowledge that no one had yet cracked the video-on-demand market in the Middle East, Mahatat and Icflix became the main competitors when they entered a fragmented market affected by piracy and little investment yet with 14.5 million hours of videos are watched per day. Mahatat soon signed deals with Sony Pictures Television, Samsung mobile and Miramax as well as independent content owners for more than 1,000 television shows and films.

In 2013, the company acquired Sha-Sha (شاشا), which was dubbed as the Netflix of the Middle East, to serve video streaming to the Arab world. Later, Mahatat teamed up with Telfaz 11, Saudi Arabia's primary Internet television network, to cater this customer base for a first window before the show hits YouTube.

In June 2015, co-produced with Cinemagics A Song in her eyes, starred by Haya Abdul Salam & Fouwad Ali. This is the first move towards original production and programming for Mahatat.

== Services ==
The company has signed up with major studios like Sony Pictures for series like Breaking Bad and films like The Social Network and There Will Be Blood. Mahatat has been reported to leverage the trend of smart TVs, and smartphones in emerging markets, an approach that has also been cited for Netflix. Mahatat has hence been mainly serving these two types of customers that prefer to stream videos online. This service has specifically been cited to be enabled in Panasonic Smart TVs as a pre-loaded service to market to Middle East with Hollywood and Arabic movies and TV shows.

== See also ==
- Comparison between OTT and IPTV
- Digital television
