= Realistic Concertmate MG-1 =

Monophonic analog synthesizer

Concertmate MG-1
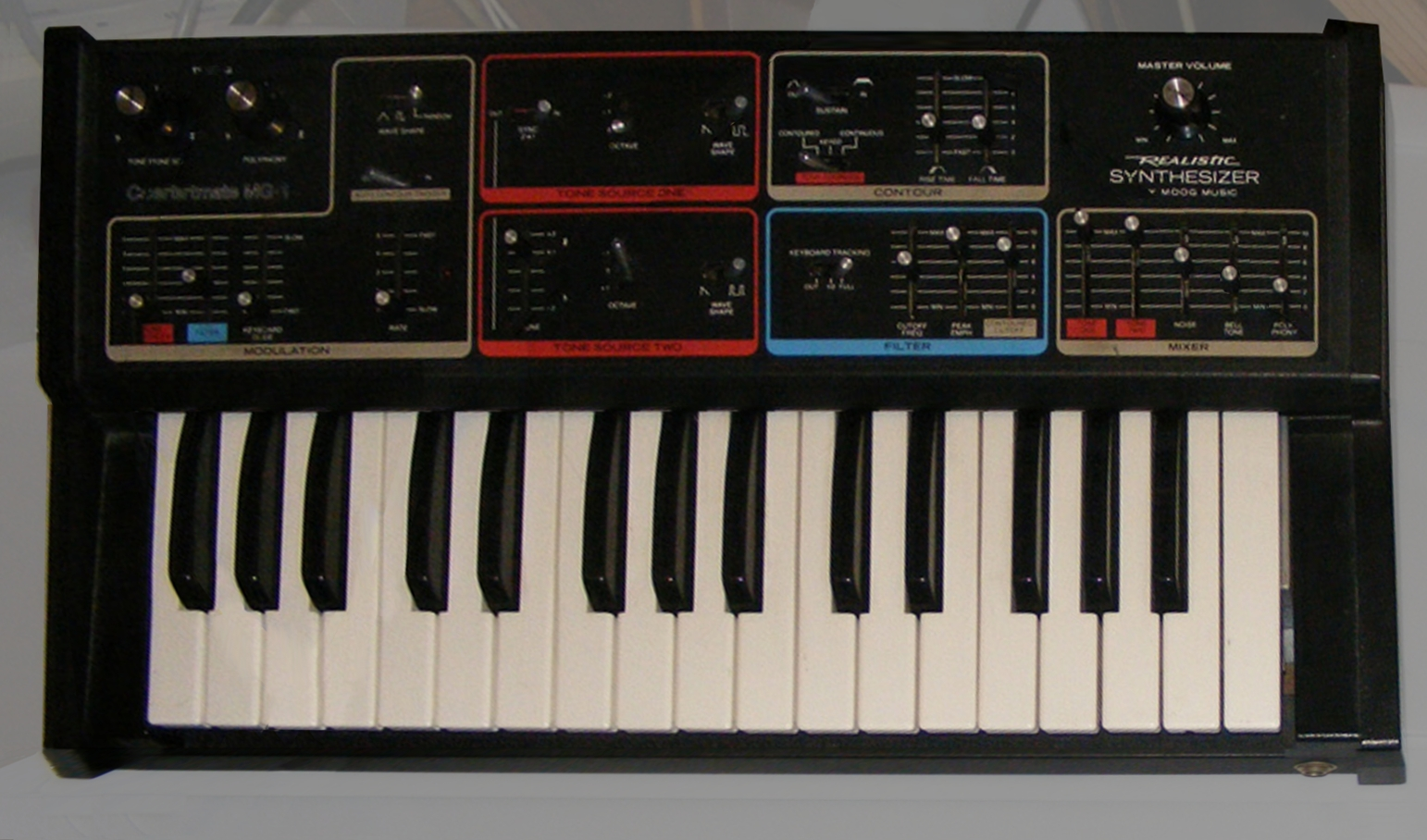
- Manufacturer: Moog Music
- Dates: 1981
- Price: $499.95

Technical specifications
- Polyphony: Monophonic; Organ section
- Timbrality: Duotimbral
- Oscillator: 3 (2 mono, 1 poly)
- LFO: 1
- Synthesis type: Analog Subtractive
- Filter: low-pass
- Attenuator: ASR
- Storage memory: none
- Effects: Ring modulation

Input/output
- Keyboard: 32 keys
- External control: CV/Gate

The Realistic Concertmate MG-1 is an analog synthesizer co-developed by Tandy and Moog Music as a basic, low-priced synthesizer to be sold by Radio Shack under their "Realistic" brand. With estimated unit sales of 23,000 from 1982 to 1983, the MG-1 became the best-selling synthesizer ever manufactured by Moog Music, and is one of the most widely-owned of all vintage Moog synthesizers.

== Background ==
In 1980, Moog Music was seeking to contract manufacture a mass-marketable synthesizer which could be sold via a large retailer. Moog representatives secured an appointment at the Radio Shack corporate offices for a 5-minute demonstration. Radio Shack approved the concept, and Paul Schreiber (then employed by Tandy Systems Development) worked together with Moog on the synthesizer's design to achieve Radio Shack's price requirements.

== Design and features ==
The MG-1 includes:

- Two oscillators with sync and detune; one producing either a square or sawtooth waveform, with the other producing either a pulse or sawtooth waveform
- One 24 dB/oct low-pass filter/VCF, which can use the envelope generator, has three-position keyboard tracking, and is capable of self-oscillation
- Three-part envelope generator, with separately adjustable attack and decay or release, and selectable sustain (on or off). The envelope generator can be triggered by either the keyboard, or the LFO
- Oscillator 2 can be tuned independently or hard-synced to oscillator 1
- Noise generator. (Digital pseudo-random noise)
- Ring modulation (labeled "Bell Tone"), which is actually amplitude modulation of VCO 1 and 2
- Polyphonic oscillator. This is a divide-down, square wave generator. It is routed to the VCF and the VCA
- LFO that can modulate the oscillators and the filter using a triangle, square, or random sample-and-hold waveform
- Voltage controlled amplifier with keyed, hold, and envelope modes (accessed via three-way switch, misleadingly only labeled "Tone Sources" but also affecting poly signal)
- Portamento (labeled "Glide")
- External control inputs for CV/Gate

The MG-1 was produced without some standard Moog features, such as pitch and modulation wheels, as a cost-cutting measure aimed at achieving a lower price for the consumer market. The synthesizer also featured a stereo pair of pass-through RCA inputs, which allowed users to mix a stereo signal from a radio, phonograph, or other sound source together with the synthesizer's sound output so that the user could "play along with their favorite tunes".

=== Polyphonic sound ===
The polyphonic features of this synthesizer are of particular interest as polyphony was rare in synthesizers of the time. The square-wave based polyphony section is described as a "cheesy organ sound" by some, and well-used by others. Since the polyphony section is independently tunable, it can function as a rudimentary third oscillator, allowing the user to create more complex tones than on similar two-oscillator synths. All of the sound-generating features come together in a mixer allowing the levels for the two monophonic tone sources, noise, bell tone, and polyphony to be adjusted independently. The multiple notes of polyphony feed into the single filter, giving a paraphonic result. In 1982–1983, few electronic musical instruments had the MG-1 combination of paraphonic poly section and monophonic synthesizer in one instrument.

It is a common misconception that the poly tones are not affected by the Contour settings. In reality, the poly tones can be affected by the rise time (attack) and fall time (decay) sliders. The contour settings can only affect polyphony while a key is pressed due to the polyphonic gate design. When a key is released, the polyphony tone for that key stops immediately. Therefore, it is true that the poly tones are not "faded out" by the fall time (release) contour setting when a key is released. Similarly, the poly tones are not "held" with the two VCOs when in "continuous" (hold or drone) mode. The rest of the modulation, including the sample-and-hold, will affect the polyphonic signal via the filter section. One thing to note however; the LFO cannot be used to modulate the pitch to create a vibrato of the polyphony section. Against these limitations, the polyphony is total, meaning all 32 keys can sound all at once.

=== Contour triggering ===
When the contour (envelope) is triggered by the LFO, it allows for periodic LFO-type waves to be applied to the VCF or VCA, depending on the rise and fall settings. This allows the creation of saw and ramp waves, as well as asymmetrical triangle waves and unusual trapezoid waves, not otherwise found through modulating with the LFO alone.

=== Unique modulation options ===
Although this synthesizer is often erroneously described as having fewer features than its Moog siblings the Liberation and the Rogue, there is a patch which only the MG-1 can do: The LFO can have independent amounts sent to the VCOs and the VCF on the MG-1. The Liberation and Rogue have to route both through the modulation wheel with the same amount level. This is a benefit of not having pitch and modulation wheels.

=== Control panel and branding ===
The synthesizer's control panel is labeled with terminology intended to be consumer-friendly, rather than standard synthesizer terminology. Oscillators are labeled "Tone Source" and the envelope filter is labeled "Contour", with attack labeled as "Rise Time" and decay or release labeled as "Fall Time". Similarly, the ring modulation is labeled "Bell Tone". Colorful red, blue, and tan graphics outline different control panel sections to make it more easily understood by the general public not familiar with analog synthesizers.

The synthesizer has a large white REALISTIC logo on the back panel, with smaller print that states: "Custom manufactured by Moog Music in U.S.A. for Radio Shack, a division of Tandy Corporation".

== Impact and legacy ==
This Realistic Concertmate MG-1 is considered an inexpensive way to achieve "Moog Bass" sounds. On the contrary, it contains black polyurethane foam insulation which, over time, disintegrates and interferes with various moving parts of the synth, so much so that complete sets of replacement switches and faders specifically for the MG-1 have been available from aftermarket retailers.

=== Similarities to Moog Rogue ===
Moog developed and introduced the similar Moog Rogue after the MG-1. Both models share exactly the same plastic casing, but are different machines in many respects. The Rogue does not have the MG-1's polyphonic tone section or "Bell Tone" (ring modulation) section. Both Rogue oscillators share the same waveforms and octave range selectors, whereas the MG-1 has separate selectors for each. The Rogue features Moog's traditional pitch and modulation wheels, while the MG-1 has two independent sliders for VCF and VCO modulation. Finally, the Rogue has an external, "wall wart" type power supply, while the MG-1's power supply is internal.

Because the MG-1 was produced in great quantities for distribution in the consumer market through Radio Shack stores instead of specialized music stores, it was easily found and was usually less expensive than a Rogue, despite actually offering more features.

== Notable users ==
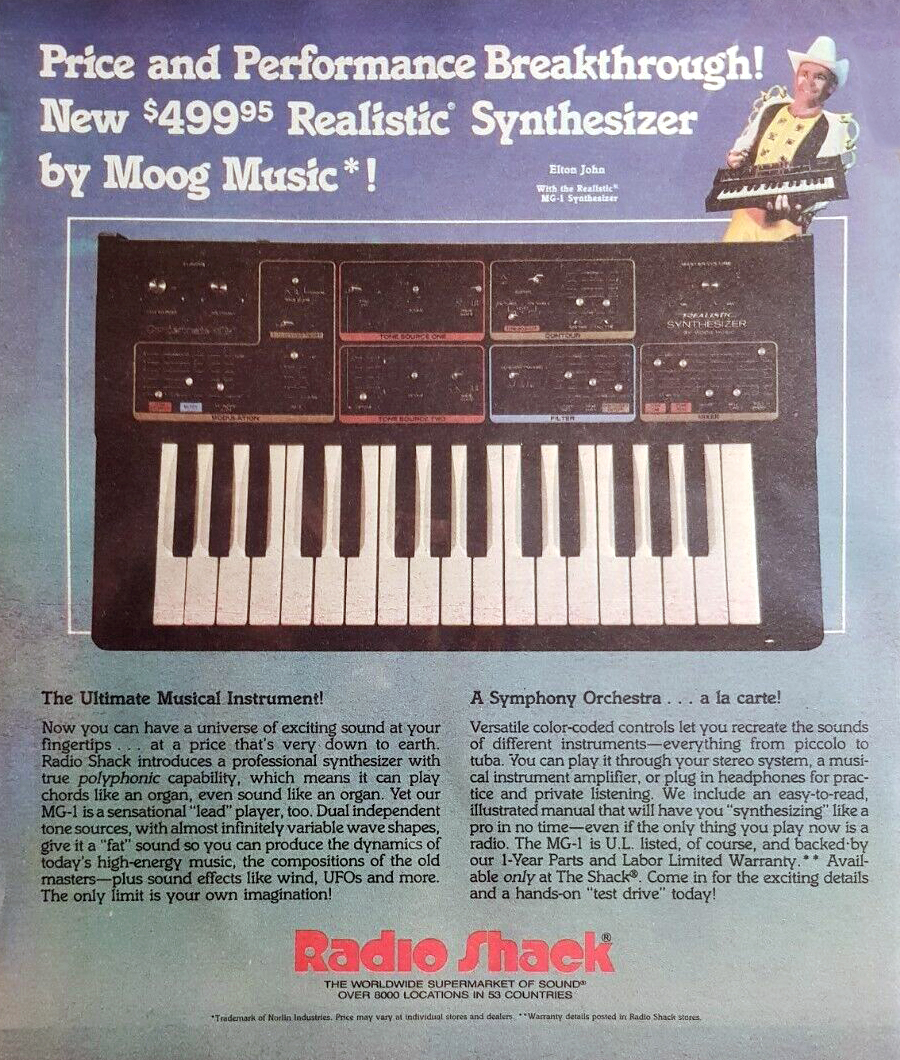
Elton John Advertising the MG-1 c. 1981

Although a picture of Elton John holding the MG-1 on his arm appears alongside the description of this synthesizer in Radio Shack's 1982 and 1983 catalogs, it isn't credited on any of his recordings or performances. The photo was the product of a publicity contract with the Tandy Corporation.

Notable MG-1 users include:

- 808 State
- Clues
- Davo of Pull Tiger Tail
- DJ Fonzi of IBOPA
- John Dwyer of Thee Oh Sees
- Aaron Freeman of Ween
- Peter Gabriel
- Gerling
- The High Llamas
- Sam Hughes of The Spinto Band
- Jesse Johnson of Motion City Soundtrack
- KMFDM
- Man or Astro-Man
- Math the Band
- Moka Only
- Anton Newcombe of Brian Jonestown Massacre
- No Doubt
- Kevin Parker of Tame Impala
- Pond
- Questlove
- Sam Rosenthal of Black Tape For A Blue Girl
- Robert Schneider of The Apples in Stereo
- Remy Shand
- Avey Tare of Animal Collective
- Tim Taylor of Brainiac
- Diego Tuñón of Babasónicos
