= Mandy Moore discography =

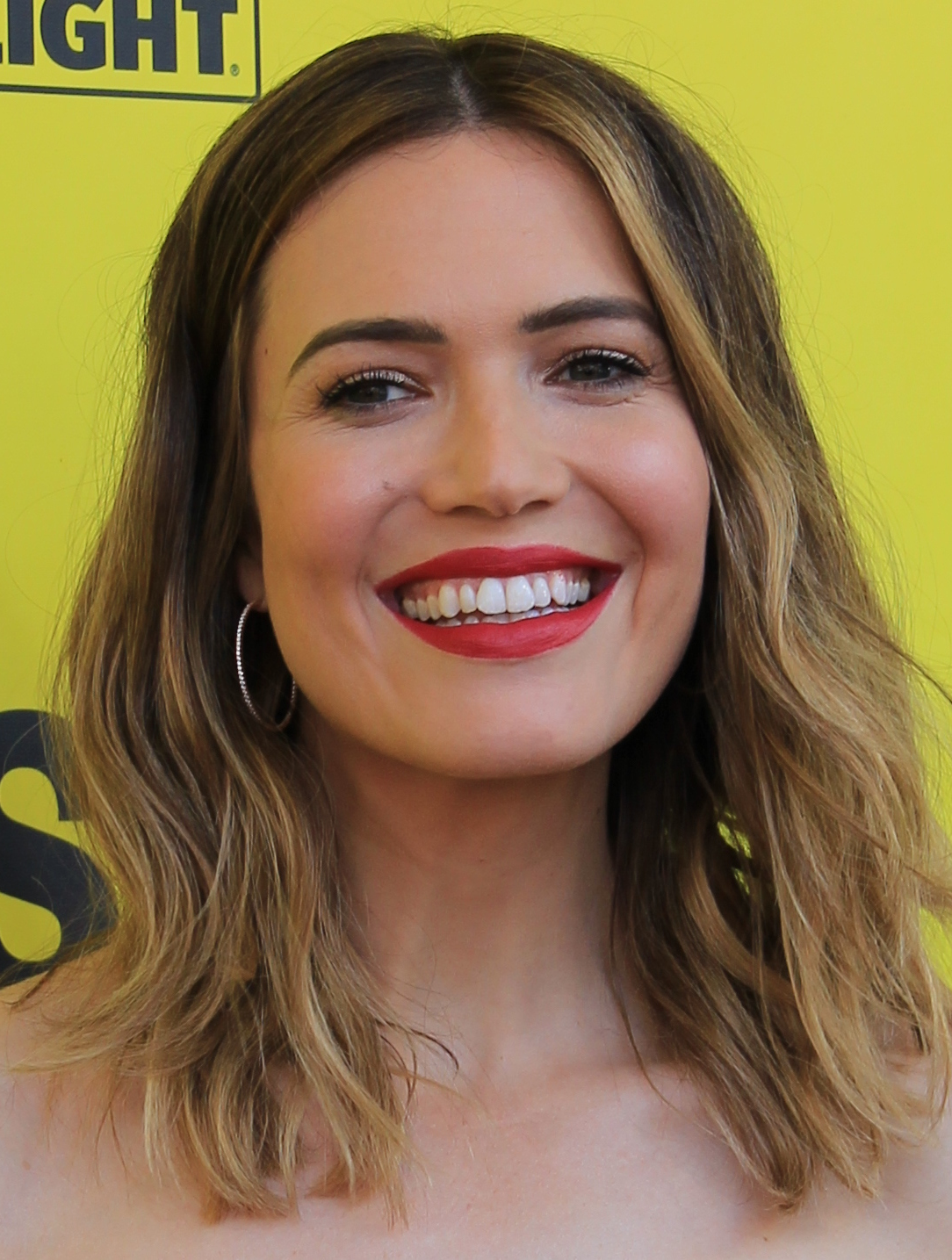
- Moore at SXSW at Austin, Texas in 2018
- Studio albums: 7
- Soundtrack albums: 18
- Compilation albums: 4
- Singles: 19
- Video albums: 2
- Music videos: 17
- Music video cameo: 4

American singer Mandy Moore has released seven studio albums, four compilation albums, two video albums, nineteen singles, and thirteen music videos. After being spotted singing at a recording studio by an artists and repertoire representative for Epic Records, Moore was signed to Sony Music. Moore has sold 2.7 million records in the US. Her debut album, So Real, was released in December 1999. The album performed moderately on the charts, peaking at number thirty-one on the Billboard 200 and was certified Platinum by the Recording Industry Association of America (RIAA). According to Nielsen SoundScan, So Real had sold about 950,000 copies in the United States by June 2009. Her debut single, "Candy", peaked at number forty-one on the US Billboard Hot 100, and was certified Gold by the RIAA. It also reached the top forty in Canada, France, Ireland, and Switzerland and the top ten in Australia, New Zealand, and the United Kingdom. In Australia the song peaked at number two on the ARIA Singles Chart and was certified Platinum by the Australian Recording Industry Association (ARIA). So Real was followed up with I Wanna Be with You, in May 2000. In North America, it was marketed as a "new version" of So Real, with remixed tracks and a few new songs. The album reached number twenty-one on the Billboard 200 and was certified Gold by the RIAA. It also went on to sell about 805,000 copies in the US by June 2009. The album spawned the single "I Wanna Be with You", which peaked at number twenty-four on the Hot 100, becoming Moore's only top-thirty song in the US and her highest peak to date. The song also reached number thirteen in Australia and was certified Gold by the ARIA.

In 2001, Mandy Moore released her self-titled second studio album, which was influenced by pop rock and Middle Eastern music. It debuted at number thirty-five on the Billboard 200, and was later certified Gold by the RIAA. By June 2009, it had sold 464,000 copies in the US and spawned three singles. The lead single, "In My Pocket", peaked at number 11 Australia and was certified Gold by the ARIA. The follow-up single, "Crush", peaked at number twenty-five in Australia. Coverage, Moore's third studio album and her first cover album, was released in October 2003. The album contained covers of songs from the 1980s and 1990s like the ones of Carole King, Joni Mitchell and Carly Simon. It debuted and peaked at number fourteen on the Billboard 200 chart. The position remains her highest peak on the chart to date, and as of June 2009 has sold 294,000 copies in the US. Moore and Sony parted ways in 2004, citing creative differences. A compilation album, The Best of Mandy Moore, followed the split. The compilation reached number 148 on the Billboard 200 and has sold about 104,000 copies in the US. A DVD of the same title, containing Moore's music videos from 1999 to 2003, was also released.

In July 2006, Moore signed a record deal with The Firm, a record label run by EMI. The singer's fourth studio album, Wild Hope, was released in June 2007. A departure from her previous style, Moore incorporated folk and acoustic music into the album. The album peaked at number thirty on the Billboard 200 chart and went on to sell about 109,000 copies in the US. In May 2009, Moore's fifth studio album, Amanda Leigh, was released through Storefront Recordings. Following the same musical style as Wild Hope, the album's title was taken from Moore's full name. It debuted at number twenty-five on the Billboard 200 and has sold 16,000 copies in the US, as of June 2009. The singles from Wild Hope and Amanda Leigh were commercially unsuccessful and failed to chart. On March 6, 2020, she released her sixth studio album, Silver Landings, her first album in 11 years.

== Albums ==
=== Studio albums ===
List of studio albums, with selected details, chart positions, certifications, and sales
Title	Details	Peak chart positions				Certifications	Sales
Title	Details	US	AUS	CAN	NZL	Certifications	Sales
So Real	Released: December 7, 1999; Label: 550 Music (BK 69917); Formats: CD, digital download	31	—	—	—	RIAA: Platinum	US: 950,000
Mandy Moore	Released: June 19, 2001; Label: Epic (EK 61430); Formats: CD, digital download	35	37	—	39	RIAA: Gold	US: 464,000; PH: 200,000
Coverage	Released: October 21, 2003; Label: Epic (EK 90127); Formats: CD, DVD, digital download	14	97	59	—		US: 294,000
Wild Hope	Released: June 19, 2007; Label: EMI/The Firm, Inc. (81006-70112-2-8); Formats: CD, digital download	30	—	84	—		World: 350,000; US: 109,000
Amanda Leigh	Released: May 26, 2009; Label: Storefront Recordings (7669-29946-3-2); Formats: CD, digital download	25	—	—	—		US: 16,000
Silver Landings	Released: March 6, 2020; Label: Verve Forecast; Formats: CD, digital download, streaming	134	—	—	—		US: 6,800
In Real Life	Released: May 13, 2022; Label: Verve Forecast; Formats: CD, LP, digital download, streaming	— (Note: In Real Life did not enter on the Billboard 200, but debuted at number 41 on the US Top Album Sales chart.)	—	—	—		
"—" denotes items which failed to chart or were not released in that country.

=== Reissues ===
List of reissues, with selected details, chart positions, and sales
Title	Details	Peak chart positions					Certifications	Sales
Title	Details	US	AUS	JPN	NZL	UK	Certifications	Sales
I Wanna Be with You	Released: May 9, 2000; Label: 550 Music (BK 62195); Formats: CD, digital download	21	55	49	6	52	RIAA: Gold	US: 805,000

=== Compilation albums ===
List of compilation albums, with selected details, chart positions, and sales
Title	Details	Peak chart positions	Sales
Title	Details	US	Sales
The Best of Mandy Moore	Released: November 16, 2004; Label: Epic (EK 93458); Formats: CD, CD+DVD, digital download	148	US: 104,000
Candy	Released: April 5, 2005; Label: Sony Music (93741); Format: CD	—	
Super Hits	Released: August 28, 2007; Label: Sony Music (712338); Format: CD	—	
"—" denotes items which failed to chart or were not released in that country.

== Singles ==
List of singles, with selected chart positions, showing year released, certifications and album name
Title	Year	Peak chart positions										Certifications	Album
Title	Year	US	US Pop	AUS	CAN	FRA	GER	NZL	SCO	SWI	UK	Certifications	Album
"Candy"	1999	41	27	2	35	16	72	10	5	39	6	RIAA: Gold; ARIA: Platinum	So Real and I Wanna Be with You
"Walk Me Home"	1999	—	38	—	—	—	—	—	—	—	—		So Real and I Wanna Be with You
"I Wanna Be with You"	2000	24	11	13	24	—	—	—	19	—	21	ARIA: Gold	I Wanna Be with You and Center Stage: Music from the Motion Picture
"So Real"	2000	—	—	21	—	—	—	18	—	—	—		I Wanna Be with You
"In My Pocket"	2001	— (Note: "In My Pocket" did not enter the Billboard Hot 100 but peaked on the Bubbling Under Hot 100 Singles chart at number two.)	21	11	—	—	—	26	—	—	—	ARIA: Gold	Mandy Moore
"Crush"	2001	—	35	25	—	—	—	—	—	—	—		Mandy Moore
"Cry"	2001	—	—	—	—	—	—	—	—	—	—		Mandy Moore and A Walk to Remember: Music From the Motion Picture
"Have a Little Faith in Me"	2003	—	39	—	—	—	—	—	—	—	—		Coverage
"Drop the Pilot"	2003	—	—	—	—	—	—	—	—	—	—		Coverage
"Senses Working Overtime" (live)	2004	—	—	—	—	—	—	—	—	—	—		Coverage
"Extraordinary"	2007	— (Note: "Extraordinary" did not enter the Billboard Hot 100 but peaked on the Bubbling Under Hot 100 Singles chart at number two.)	—	—	—	—	—	—	—	—	—		Wild Hope
"Nothing That You Are"	2007	—	—	—	—	—	—	—	—	—	—		Wild Hope
"I Could Break Your Heart Any Day of the Week"	2009	—	—	—	—	—	—	—	—	—	—		Amanda Leigh
"When I Wasn't Watching"	2019	— (Note: "When I Wasn't Watching" did not enter the Billboard Hot 100 but peaked on the US Alternative Digital Song Sales chart at number twenty four.)	—	—	—	—	—	—	—	—	—		Silver Landings
"I’d Rather Lose"	2019	—	—	—	—	—	—	—	—	—	—		Silver Landings
"Save a Little for Yourself"	2020	—	—	—	—	—	—	—	×	—	—		Silver Landings
"Fifteen"	2020	—	—	—	—	—	—	—	×	—	—		Silver Landings
"In Real Life"	2022	—	—	—	—	—	—	—	×	—	—		In Real Life
"Little Dreams"	2022	—	—	—	—	—	—	—	×	—	—		In Real Life
"Four Moons"	2022	—	—	—	—	—	—	—	×	—	—		In Real Life
"—" denotes items which failed to chart or were not released in that country. "×" denotes periods where charts did not exist or were not archived.

== Soundtrack appearances ==
Song	Year	Certifications	Film
"Stupid Cupid"	2001		The Princess Diaries: Original Soundtrack
"On the Line" (with *NSYNC, Christian Burns and True Vibe)	2001		On the Line: Original Motion Picture Soundtrack
"Only Hope"	2002		A Walk to Remember: Music From the Motion Picture
"Someday We'll Know" (with Jonathan Foreman)	2002		A Walk to Remember: Music From the Motion Picture
"It's Gonna Be Love"	2002		A Walk to Remember: Music From the Motion Picture
"Top of the World"	2002		Stuart Little 2
"Song of Life"	2002		Tarzan & Jane
"Secret Love"	2003		Mona Lisa Smile
"One Way or Another"	2006		Aquamarine: Music from the Motion Picture
"Dreamz with a Z"	2006		American Dreamz
"Mommy Don't Drink Me to Bed Tonight"	2006		American Dreamz
"When Will My Life Begin (Reprise 1)"	2010		Tangled: Original Soundtrack
"When Will My Life Begin?"	2010	RIAA: 3× Platinum; BPI: Platinum	Tangled: Original Soundtrack
"I See the Light"(with Zachary Levi)	2010	RIAA: 3× Platinum; BPI: Gold	Tangled: Original Soundtrack
"When Will My Life Begin (Reprise 2)"	2010		Tangled: Original Soundtrack
"I've Got a Dream" (with Brad Garrett, Jeffrey Tambor, Zachary Levi, Company)	2010	RIAA: Platinum; BPI: Silver	Tangled: Original Soundtrack
"Healing Incantation"	2010		Tangled: Original Soundtrack
"The Tear Heals"	2010		Tangled: Original Soundtrack
"Sheriff Callie's Wild West Theme Song"	2014		Sheriff Callie's Wild West (Music from the TV Series)
"Cowgirl Twirl"	2014		Sheriff Callie's Wild West (Music from the TV Series)
"Amazing Lucky Scarf"	2014		Sheriff Callie's Wild West (Music from the TV Series)
"We're Gonna Clean Up Our Town"	2014		Sheriff Callie's Wild West (Music from the TV Series)
"You're Not a Tattletale"	2014		Sheriff Callie's Wild West (Music from the TV Series)
"Chugga Chugga Choo Choo Train"	2014		Sheriff Callie's Wild West (Music from the TV Series)
"Sparky, Come Back to Me"	2014		Sheriff Callie's Wild West (Music from the TV Series)
"Picture Perfect"	2014		Sheriff Callie's Wild West (Music from the TV Series)
"Sayin' I'm Sorry"	2014		Sheriff Callie's Wild West (Music from the TV Series)
"Cattle Drive"	2014		Sheriff Callie's Wild West (Music from the TV Series)
"Those Peppers"	2014		Sheriff Callie's Wild West (Music from the TV Series)
"Ask for Help"	2014		Sheriff Callie's Wild West (Music from the TV Series)
"Willin'"	2017		This Is Us (Music From the Series)
"Wind in My Hair"	2019		Rapunzel’s Tangled Adventure (Music from the TV Series)
"Life After Happily Ever After" (with Zachary Levi & Clancy Brown)	2019		Rapunzel’s Tangled Adventure (Music from the TV Series)
"Wind in My Hair (Reprise)"	2019		Rapunzel’s Tangled Adventure (Music from the TV Series)
"I've Got This" (with Eden Espinosa)	2019		Rapunzel’s Tangled Adventure (Music from the TV Series)
"Listen Up" (with Danielle Brooks, Steve Blum, Jeffrey Tambor, Charles Harlford, Paul F. Tompkins & M. C. Gainey)	2019		Rapunzel’s Tangled Adventure (Music from the TV Series)
"Set Myself Free"	2019		Rapunzel’s Tangled Adventure (Music from the TV Series)
"Ready As I'll Be" (with Jeremy Jordan, Eden Espinosa, Zachary Levi, Clancy Brown & cast	2019		Rapunzel’s Tangled Adventure (Music from the TV Series)
"If I Could Take This Moment Back" (with Zachary Levi)	2019		Rapunzel’s Tangled Adventure (Music from the TV Series)
"Next Stop Anywhere" (with Zachary Levi & Eden Espinosa)	2019		Rapunzel’s Tangled Adventure (Music from the TV Series)
"Next Stop Anywhere (Reprise)" (with Zachary Levi)	2019		Rapunzel’s Tangled Adventure (Music from the TV Series)
"The View from up Here" (with Eden Espinosa)	2019		Rapunzel’s Tangled Adventure (Music from the TV Series)
"With You by My Side" (with Zachary Levi & Eden Espinosa)	2019		Rapunzel’s Tangled Adventure (Music from the TV Series)
"Crossing the Line" (with Eden Espinosa)	2019		Rapunzel’s Tangled Adventure (Music from the TV Series)
"Stronger Than Ever Before" (with Zachary Levi & James Monroe Iglehart)	2019		Rapunzel’s Tangled Adventure (Music from the TV Series)
"The Girl Who Has Everything"	2019		Rapunzel’s Tangled Adventure (Music from the TV Series)
"The Girl Who Has Everything (Reprise)	2019		Rapunzel’s Tangled Adventure (Music from the TV Series)
"Through It All" with cast	2019		Rapunzel’s Tangled Adventure (Music from the TV Series)
"I'd Give Anything"	2019		Rapunzel’s Tangled Adventure (Music from the TV Series)
"Life After Happily Ever After (Reprise)" with cast	2019		Rapunzel’s Tangled Adventure (Music from the TV Series)

== Videography ==
=== Video releases ===
Title	Album details	Notes
The Real Story	Released: December 19, 2000; Label: Sony Music Distribution; Format: DVD	Authorized video biography of Moore.; Includes interviews, footage from her early years and music videos for "Candy", "I Wanna Be With You", "Walk Me Home", and "So Real".; Also features production stills, a trivia game, and a commentary track by Moore.
The Best of Mandy Moore	Released: November 16, 2004; Label: Sony Music Distribution; Format: DVD	A compilation of all the music videos by Mandy Moore from 1999 to 2003.; Performances at the Sessions@AOL also included.

=== Music videos ===
Title	Year	Director
"Candy"	1999	Chris Robinson
"Walk Me Home"	2000	Gregory Dark
"I Wanna Be with You"	2000	Nigel Dick
"So Real"	2000	Gregory Dark
"In My Pocket"	2001	Matthew Rolston
"Crush"	2001	Chris Applebaum
"On the Line"	2001	Marc Webb
"Cry"	2002	Chris Applebaum
"Drop the Pilot"	2003	Nick DiBella
"Have a Little Faith in Me"	2003	Christopher Mills
"Extraordinary"	2007	Ace Norton
"I Could Break Your Heart Any Day of the Week"	2009	Ghost Town Media
"When I Wasn't Watching"	2019	Lauren Dukoff
"Save A Little For Yourself"	2020	Liz Hart & Sonja Tsypin
"Fifteen"	2020	Liz Hart
"Tryin' My Best, Los Angeles"	2020	—N/a
"In Real Life"	2022	Anya Salmen
"Four Moons"	2022	Lauren Dukoff

=== Music video appearances ===
Title	Year	Original artist
"Little Things"	2000	Good Charlotte
"Original Sin"	2002	Elton John
"Make You Crazy"	2008	Brett Dennen featuring Femi Kuti
"Stand Up 2 Cancer"	2010	Various Artists
"Our Fight Song"	2016	Democratic National Convention featuring Various Artists
