= The Best of Mandy Moore =

Greatest hits album by Mandy Moore
- Released: November 16, 2004
- Recorded: 1999–2003
- Length: 53:16
- Label: Epic
- Producers: Jive Jones; Tony Battaglia; Shaun Fisher; Keith Thomas; Kenny Gioia; Shep Goodman; James Renald; John Fields

Mandy Moore chronology
Coverage (2003)	The Best of Mandy Moore (2004)	Candy (2005)

The Best of Mandy Moore is the first greatest hits album from American singer Mandy Moore, released on November 16, 2004, by Epic Records. The compilation includes tracks from her first three studio albums as well as I Wanna Be with You in addition to a few tracks from soundtracks Moore was part of. It also includes music videos and live performances.

The album debuted at number 148 on the US Billboard 200 chart. The album has sold 104,000 copies in the United States.

== Content ==
Moore's earliest hit to be featured on the album is "Candy", the first single from her debut album So Real (1999). The two other songs that are included from So Real are "Walk Me Home" and "So Real". "I Wanna Be with You" was first featured on I Wanna Be with You (2000). "In My Pocket" was the first single from her self-titled second studio album. "Crush" was the album's second single following the mildly successful "In My Pocket". "Cry" and Moore's cover of Only Hope by American band Switchfoot tied in with the romantic drama film A Walk to Remember, Moore's debut as a lead actress. Four songs from her third studio album Coverage (2003), were included, among which is Moore's own versions of "Have a Little Faith in Me" and "Senses Working Overtime". "Top of the World" was featured in the films Stuart Little 2, Bridge to Terabithia, and Surf's Up. The final track in the compilation is a cover of Doris Day's "Secret Love" from the Mona Lisa Smile soundtrack.

== Critical reception ==
Professional ratings
Review scores
Source	Rating
Allmusic	4.5/5 stars
Blender	3/5 stars

Allmusic writer Stephen Thomas Erlewine described the album as "one of the better artifacts of the teen pop boom" and "stronger and more enjoyable than almost any other teen pop record from its time."

== Track listing ==
Disc 1 (CD)
No.	Title	Writer(s)	Producer(s)	Length
1.	"Candy"	Denise Rich, Dave Katz, Denny Kleiman, Tony Battaglia	Jive Jones, Tony Battaglia, Shaun Fisher	3:54
2.	"Walk Me Home"	Tony Battaglia, Shaun Fisher, Wasabees	Tony Battaglia, Shaun Fisher	4:22
3.	"So Real"	Tony Battaglia, Shaun Fisher, Wasabees		3:50
4.	"I Wanna Be with You"	Shelly Peiken, Tiffany Arbuckle, Keith Thomas	Keith Thomas	4:13
5.	"In My Pocket"	Randall Barlow, Emilio Estefan Jr., Liza Quintana, Gian Marco Zignago	Kenny Gioia, Shep Goodman, James Renald	3:39
6.	"Crush"	Kenny Gioia, Shep Goodman	Kenny Gioia, Shep Goodman, James Renald	3:42
7.	"Cry"	James Renald	James Renald	3:43
8.	"Only Hope"	Jonathan Foreman	Mervyn Warren	3:54
9.	"Have a Little Faith in Me"	John Hiatt	John Fields	4:04
10.	"Can We Still Be Friends"	Todd Rundgren	John Fields	3:38
11.	"Senses Working Overtime"	Andy Partridge	John Fields	4:08
12.	"I Feel the Earth Move"	Carole King	John Fields	3:08
13.	"Top of the World"	Jeff Cohen, Leah Haywood, Daniel Pringle	Gregg Wattenberg	3:23
14.	"Secret Love"	Sammy Fain, Paul Webster	Trevor Horn	3:40
Total length:				53:16

Disc 2 (DVD)
No.	Title	Length
1.	"Candy" (music video)	3:58
2.	"Walk Me Home" (music video)	3:42
3.	"So Real" (music video)	3:48
4.	"I Wanna Be with You" (music video)	4:11
5.	"In My Pocket" (music video)	3:38
6.	"Crush" (music video)	3:50
7.	"Cry" (music video)	3:40
8.	"Have a Little Faith in Me" (music video)	4:03
9.	"Moonshadow" (live from Sessions@AOL)	2:55
10.	"Senses Working Overtime" (live from Sessions@AOL)	4:08
11.	"Drop the Pilot" (live from Sessions@AOL)	3:54
12.	"Have a Little Faith in Me" (live from Sessions@AOL)	3:44
Total length:		45:31

== Charts ==
Chart performance for The Best of Mandy Moore
Chart (2004)	Peak position
US Billboard 200	148
