= List of awards and nominations received by Mandy Moore =

Mandy Moore awards and nominations
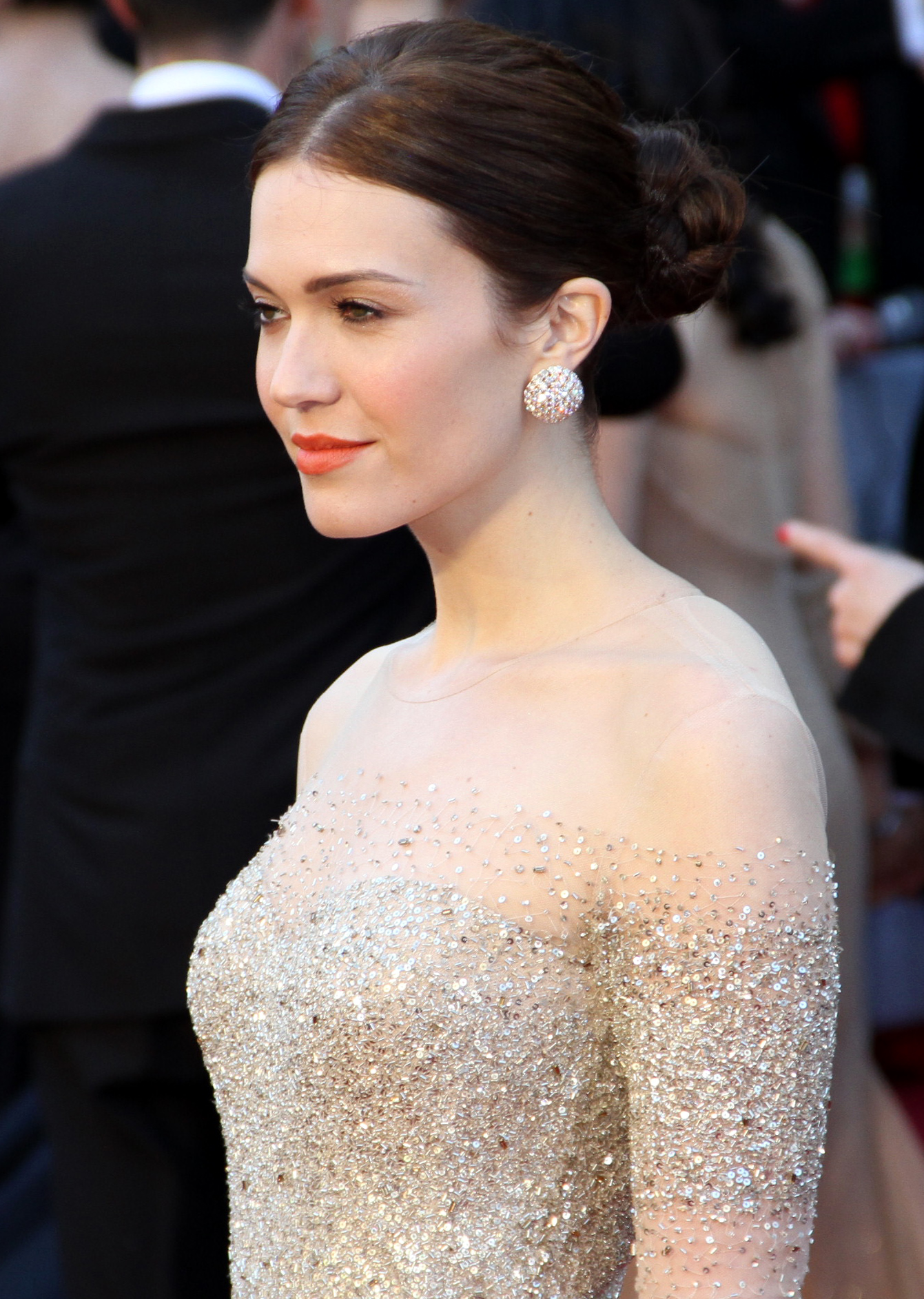
- Moore at the 83rd Academy Awards, 2011
Awards and nominations
Award	Wins	Nominations
Golden Globe Awards	0	1
MTV Movie & TV Awards	1	3
Nickelodeon Kids Choice Awards	1	1
Screen Actors Guild Awards	2	2
Primetime Emmy Awards	0	1
Teen Choice Awards	3	8
Young Hollywood Awards	2	2

Totals (Note: Certain award groups do not simply award one winner. They acknowledge several different recipients, have runners-up, and have third place. Since this is a specific recognition and is different from losing an award, runner-up mentions are considered wins in this award tally. For simplification and to avoid errors, each award in this list has been presumed to have had a prior nomination.)
- Wins: 18
- Nominations: 54

The following is a list of awards and nominations received by American actress and singer Mandy Moore.

Amanda Leigh Moore is an American singer, songwriter, and actress. She rose to fame with her debut single, "Candy", which peaked at number 41 on the Billboard Hot 100. Her debut studio album, So Real (1999), received a platinum certification from the RIAA. The title single from her reissue of So Real, I Wanna Be With You (2000), became Moore's first top 40 song in the US, peaking at number 24 on the Hot 100. Moore subsequently released the studio albums Mandy Moore (2001), Coverage (2003), Wild Hope (2007), Amanda Leigh (2009), Silver Landings (2020), and In Real Life (2022). Overall Moore has sold 2.7 million albums in the US according to Billboard.

Moore made her feature film debut in 2001, with a minor voice role in the comedy film Dr. Dolittle 2, before starring as Lana Thomas in the comedy film The Princess Diaries. She received recognition for her starring role as Jamie Sullivan in the romantic drama film A Walk to Remember (2002), and starred in the films Chasing Liberty (2004), Saved! (2004), Racing Stripes (2005), Because I Said So (2007), License to Wed (2007), Love, Wedding, Marriage (2011), 47 Meters Down (2017), The Darkest Minds (2018), and Midway (2019). Moore also voiced Princess Rapunzel in the Disney animated fantasy musical comedy film Tangled (2010) and her later appearances in Disney media.

Beginning in 2016, Moore starred as Rebecca Pearson in the NBC family comedy-drama series This Is Us. For her performance, she was nominated for the Golden Globe Award for Best Supporting Actress and the Primetime Emmy Award for Outstanding Lead Actress in a Drama Series, and won two Screen Actors Guild Awards for Outstanding Performance by an Ensemble in a Drama Series. In 2019, Moore was awarded a star on the Hollywood Walk of Fame. In 2012, Moore was ranked number 96 on VH1's list of "100 Greatest Women in Music" as well as number 63 on their "Sexiest Artists of All Time List".

== Awards and nominations ==
Award	Year (Note: Indicates the year of ceremony. Each year is linked to the article about the awards held that year, wherever possible.)	Recipient(s) and nominee(s)	Category	Result	Ref.
Alliance of Women Film Journalists	2010	Tangled	Best Animated Female	Nominated	
ACE Awards	2007	–	Fashion Innovator	Won	
Behind The Voice Actors Awards	2018	Tangled: Before Ever After	Best Female Lead Vocal Performance in a TV Special/Direct-to-DVD Title or Short	Won	
Behind The Voice Actors Awards	2018	Tangled: Before Ever After	Best Vocal Ensemble in a TV Special/Direct-to-DVD Title or Short	Nominated	
Blockbuster Entertainment Awards	2001	–	Favorite Female New Artist	Nominated	
Critics' Choice Awards	2023	This Is Us	Best Actress in a Drama Series	Nominated	
G-Phoria	2003	Kingdom Hearts	Best Live Action/Voice Female Performance	Nominated	
Golden Globe Awards	2017	This Is Us	Best Supporting Actress – Series, Miniseries or Television Film	Nominated	
Guild of Music Supervisors Awards	2020	Invisible Ink	Best Song Written and/or Recorded for Television	Nominated	
Hollywood Critics Association TV Awards	2021	This Is Us	Best Actress in a Broadcast Network or Cable Series, Drama	Nominated	
Hollywood Critics Association TV Awards	2022	This Is Us	Best Actress in a Broadcast Network or Cable Series, Drama	Nominated	
Hollywood Critics Association TV Awards	2022	This Is Us	Virtuoso Award	Won	
Hollywood Walk of Fame	2019	This Is Us	Television	Inducted	
MTV Movie Awards	2002	A Walk to Remember	Breakthrough Female Performance	Won	
MTV Movie Awards	2002	A Walk to Remember	Best Musical Sequence	Nominated	
MTV Movie Awards	2017	This Is Us	Best Actor in a Show	Nominated	
MYX Music Awards	2002	Cry	Song of The Year	Won	
Nickelodeon Kids Choice Awards	2000	I Wanna Be with You	Favorite Rising Star	Won	
Online Film and Television Association	2011	Tangled	Best Voice-Over Performance	Nominated	
Online Film and Television Association	2011	Tangled	Best Music, Original Song	Nominated	
People's Choice Awards	2017	This Is Us	Favorite Actress in a New TV Series	Nominated	
People's Choice Awards	2018	This Is Us	The Female TV Star of 2018	Nominated	
People's Choice Awards	2019	This Is Us	The Female TV Star of 2019	Nominated	
People's Choice Awards	2020	This Is Us	The Female TV Star of 2020	Nominated	
People's Choice Awards	2020	This Is Us	The Drama TV Star of 2020	Won	
People's Choice Awards	2021	This Is Us	The Female TV Star of 2021	Nominated	
People's Choice Awards	2021	This Is Us	The Drama TV Star of 2021	Nominated	
People's Choice Awards	2022	This Is Us	The Female TV Star of 2022	Nominated	
People's Choice Awards	2022	This Is Us	The Drama TV Star of 2022	Nominated	
Primetime Emmy Awards	2019	This Is Us	Outstanding Lead Actress in a Drama Series	Nominated	
Radio Disney Music Awards	2001	–	Best Female Artist	Won	
Radio Disney Music Awards	2001	I Wanna Be with You	Song of the Year	Won	
Radio Disney Music Awards	2001	I Wanna Be with You	Best Homework Song	Nominated	
Radio Disney Music Awards	2001	I Wanna Be with You	Best Album	Nominated	
Radio Disney Music Awards	2004	–	Best Actress Turned Singer	Nominated	
Screen Actors Guild Awards	2018	This Is Us (shared with This is Us cast)	Outstanding Performance by an Ensemble in a Drama Series	Won	
Screen Actors Guild Awards	2019	This Is Us (shared with This is Us cast)	Outstanding Performance by an Ensemble in a Drama Series	Won	
Shorty Awards	2016	–	Arts & Entertainment – Actress	Nominated	
Shorty Awards	2019	–	Best Actor	Nominated	
The Stinkers Bad Movie Awards	2006	Dreamz with a Z	Worst Song or Song Performance in a Film or Its End Credits	Nominated	
Teen Choice Awards	2000	–	Choice Music: Female Artist	Nominated	
Teen Choice Awards	2002	A Walk To Remember	Choice Breakout Movie Actress	Won	
Teen Choice Awards	2002	A Walk To Remember	Choice Movie Chemistry	Won	
Teen Choice Awards	2003	–	Choice Crossover Artist (Music/Acting)	Won	
Teen Choice Awards	2004	Saved!	Choice Movie Villain	Nominated	
Teen Choice Awards	2004	Saved!	Choice Movie Hissy Fit	Nominated	
Teen Choice Awards	2004	Chasing Liberty	Choice Drama Movie Actress	Nominated	
Teen Choice Awards	2017	47 Meters Down	Choice Summer Movie Actress	Nominated	
Television Critics Association Awards	2022	This Is Us	Individual Achievement in Drama	Won	
TRL Awards	2003	–	Quit Your Day Job Award	Nominated	
Us Against Alzheimer's	2020	–	Bea Lerner Award	Won	
World Soundtrack Awards	2011	Tangled:Official Soundtrack	World Soundtrack Award	Nominated	
Yahoo!	2011	–	Favorite Actress of the 2000s	Nominated	
Young Hollywood Awards	2002	–	Superstar of Tomorrow – Female	Won	
Young Hollywood Awards	2003	–	Unstoppable Vision	Won	

== Listicles ==
Name of publisher, name of listicle, year(s) listed, and placement result
Publisher	Year	Listicle	Placement	Ref.
Ask Men	99 Most Desirable Women	2002	97th place	
Ask Men	99 Most Desirable Women	2003	63rd Place	
Ask Men	99 Most Desirable Women	2005	40th place	
Ask Men	99 Most Desirable Women	2006	58th place	
Ask Men	99 Most Desirable Women	2007	53rd Place	
FHM	100 Sexiest Women of the Year	2001	94th place	
FHM	100 Sexiest Women of the Year	2002	52nd Place	
FHM	100 Sexiest Women of the Year	2003	51st Place	
FHM	100 Sexiest Women of the Year	2004	62nd Place	
FHM	100 Sexiest Women of the Year	2005	35th place	
FHM	100 Sexiest Women of the Year	2006	31st Place	
FHM	100 Sexiest Women of the Year	2007	24th place	
Forbes	Celebrity 100	2002	86th place	
Maxim Magazine	100 Sexiest Women's List	2001	25th place	
Maxim Magazine	100 Sexiest Women's List	2002	22nd Place	
Maxim Magazine	100 Sexiest Women's List	2004	73rd Place	
Maxim Magazine	100 Sexiest Women's List	2006	28th place	
Maxim Magazine	100 Sexiest Women's List	2007	48th place	
Maxim Magazine	100 Sexiest Women's List	2008	75th place	
VH1	100 Hottest Hotties list	2003	43rd place	
VH1	50 Greatest Teen Idols list	2003	46th place	
VH1	100 Greatest Women in Music list	2012	96th place	
VH1	Sexiest Artists of All Time list	2012	63rd place	
