= So Real =

So Real may refer to:

== Music ==
- So Real (album), a 1999 album by Mandy Moore
  - "So Real" (Mandy Moore song), from the album of the same name
- So Real: Songs from Jeff Buckley, a 2007 album by Jeff Buckley
  - "So Real" (Jeff Buckley song), from the 1994 album Grace
- "So Real", a song by the Black Eyed Peas from the single "My Humps"
- "So Real", a song by Bloc Party from the album Hymns, 2016
- "So Real", a song by Candlebox from the album Happy Pills, 1998
- "So Real", a song by Love Decade, 1991
- "So Real", a song by Simon Townshend from the album Sweet Sound, 1983
- "So Real (Warriors)", a song by Too Many Zooz vs. KDA featuring Jess Glynne from the deluxe edition of Always In Between, 2018

== Other ==
- SoReal Cru, a hip-hop dance crew from Houston, Texas
