= Charlie Sims =

Charlie Sims may refer to:

- Charlie Sims (The Only Way Is Essex)
- Charlie Sims, character in Center Stage (2000 film)
