= Shakiem Evans =

American actor

Shakiem Evans is a stage and screen actor, dancer, and singer. He is best known for his role as Erik O. Jones in Center Stage (2000). He toured the U.S. in Disney's High School Musical as Chad Danforth (2007).

Evans graduated with a B.F.A. with Honors from the prestigious Carnegie Mellon School Of Drama in Pittsburgh, Pennsylvania. His stage work includes Fame on 42nd Street! (2004), Mamma Mia! (2005), and High School Musical (2007). His television work includes appearances on Sabrina The Teenage Witch (2000), That's Life (2000), and Providence (2002). Additionally he appeared as Tito Jackson in the made for television movie The Jacksons: An American Dream (1992). He is perhaps best known for the dance centered drama Center Stage in which he plays Erik O. Jones (2000).
