= I Wanna Be with You (Mandy Moore song) =

2000 song by Mandy Moore

Single by Mandy Moore

from the album I Wanna Be with You and Center Stage: Music from the Motion Picture
- B-side: "Let Me Be the One"; "Love Shot"
- Released: April 3, 2000
- Genre: Teen pop
- Length: 4:57
- Label: Epic; 550 Music
- Songwriters: Tiffany Arbuckle; Shelly Peiken; Keith Thomas
- Producer: Keith Thomas

Mandy Moore singles chronology
"Walk Me Home" (2000)	"I Wanna Be with You" (2000)	"So Real" (2000)

Audio sample
- file; help

Music video
- "I Wanna Be with You" on YouTube

"I Wanna Be with You" is a song by American singer Mandy Moore. It was released on April 3, 2000, as the lead single from I Wanna Be with You, the 2000 reissue of Moore's debut album, So Real. It was also released as a single from the soundtrack to the 2000 film Center Stage. The song received positive reviews from critics and peaked at number 24 on the Billboard Hot 100 chart, becoming Moore's first and only top-30 single in the United States. The song also peaked at number 13 in Australia and was certified gold by the Australian Recording Industry Association (ARIA). The music video for the song, directed by Nigel Dick, shows Moore singing the song to her love interest in a dance studio.

== Composition ==
"I Wanna Be with You" is written in the key of E♭ major and is set in the time signature of common time. It is moderately paced with a tempo of 76 beats per minute. The song also follows the sequence of E♭maj7–A♭–E♭7–A♭maj7 as its chord progression. Mandy Moore's vocals in the song spans from the note of A♭_{3} to D♭_{5}. The version used in the 2000 film Center Stage has more poppy beats

== Reception ==
Billboard magazine praised the song and said, "Top 40 programmers and listeners alike will love Moore more with this track...just delightful", and AllMusic chose the song as a highlight track on the 2000 parent album I Wanna Be with You, a reissue of Moore's 1999 debut album So Real.

== Chart performance ==
The single was released in April 2000 and soon became Moore's highest-charting song in the US, reaching number 24, becoming her only top-40 song in the nation. It spent 16 weeks on the Billboard Hot 100 and peaked during its ninth week on the chart. In Australia, the single reached number 13 on the ARIA Singles Chart and spent 19 weeks in the top 50. It also peaked at number 21 in the United Kingdom, becoming her second and final single to chart there.

== Track listings ==
Australian maxi-CD single

1. "I Wanna Be with You" – 4:12
2. "Let Me Be the One" – 3:48
3. "Candy" (Rhythm Masters club mix) – 7:35
4. "I Wanna Be with You" (Soul Solution remix extended) – 10:16

European CD1

1. "I Wanna Be with You" (radio edit) – 4:12
2. "I Wanna Be with You" (Soul Solution remix radio edit) – 4:21

European CD2

1. "I Wanna Be with You" (radio edit) – 4:12
2. "I Wanna Be with You" (Soul Solution remix extended) – 10:16
3. "Candy" (Rhythm Masters club mix) – 7:35

UK CD1

1. "I Wanna Be with You" – 4:12
2. "Let Me Be the One" – 3:48
3. "Love Shot" – 4:23

UK CD2

1. "I Wanna Be with You" – 4:12
2. "I Wanna Be with You" (Soul Solution remix radio edit) – 4:21
3. "Candy" (Wade Robson remix) – 7:35
4. "I Wanna Be with You" (video)

UK cassette single

1. "I Wanna Be with You" – 4:12
2. "Let Me Be the One" – 3:48

== Credits and personnel ==
Credits are adapted from the I Wanna Be with You liner notes.

- Writing – Shelly Peiken, Tiffany Arbuckle
- Writing, production, arrangement – Keith Thomas
- Lead vocals – Mandy Moore
- Backing vocals – Tiffany Arbuckle
- Bass guitar, acoustic guitar, drum programming, synthesizer – Keith Thomas
- Electric guitar – Jerry McPhershon, Kenny Greenberg
- Engineering assistant – Hadyn Buxton
- Engineering, mixing – Bill Whittington
- Production coordination, Pro Tools – Shaun Shankel
- Additional programming – Dan Muckala

== Charts ==
=== Weekly charts ===
Chart (2000)	Peak position
Australia (ARIA)	13
Canada Top Singles (RPM)	24
Canada Adult Contemporary (RPM)	77
Europe (European Hot 100 Singles)	68
Ireland (IRMA)	34
Scottish Singles Sales (Official Charts)	19
UK Singles (Official Charts)	21
US Billboard Hot 100	24
US Pop Airplay (Billboard)	11
US Rhythmic Airplay (Billboard)	31
US Top 40 Tracks (Billboard)	14

=== Year-end charts ===
Chart (2000)	Position
Australia (ARIA)	70
US Hot Soundtrack Singles (Billboard)	10
US Mainstream Top 40 (Billboard)	41

== Certifications ==
Region	Certification	Certified units/sales
Australia (ARIA)	Gold	35,000^{^}
^{^} Shipments figures based on certification alone.

== Release history ==
Region	Date	Format(s)	Label(s)	Ref(s).
United States	April 3, 2000	Contemporary hit radio	Epic; 550 Music	
United States	June 26, 2000	Adult contemporary; hot adult contemporary radio	Epic; 550 Music	
United Kingdom	August 7, 2000	CD; cassette	Epic; 550 Music	
