= Walk Me Home (Mandy Moore song) =

1999 single by Mandy Moore

Single by Mandy Moore

from the album So Real and I Wanna Be with You
- Released: December 4, 1999
- Genre: Teen pop
- Length: 4:21
- Label: Epic; 550
- Songwriters: Tony Battaglia; Shaun Fisher
- Producer: The Wasabees

Mandy Moore singles chronology
"Candy" (1999)	"Walk Me Home" (1999)	"I Wanna Be with You" (2000)

Music video
- "Walk Me Home" on YouTube

"Walk Me Home" is a song by American singer Mandy Moore from her debut album, So Real (1999), and released as the album's second single in December 4, 1999. The song was featured in the film Center Stage and on the reissue of So Real, I Wanna Be with You (2000). It was written and produced by Tony Battaglia and Shaun Fisher, credited as the production duo the Wasabees. Chuck Taylor from Billboard provided a positive review of the song, describing it as "the best song Janet Jackson never recorded."

The single did not achieve the same success as "Candy" and failed to enter the US Billboard Hot 100. Following its re-release on October 3, 2000, it peaked at number 38 on the Billboard Mainstream Top 40 chart that November."Walk Me Home" has sold 2,000 physical copies and 104,000 paid digital downloads according to Nielsen SoundScan.

== Music video ==
The music video for the song was directed by Gregory Dark. Eric Lively plays the part of Moore's romantic interest, whom she meets at a magical movie premiere while traveling through an L.A. airport.

== Charts ==
Chart (2000)	Peak position
US Pop Airplay (Billboard)	38
