= List of Sheriff Callie's Wild West songs =

Sheriff Callie's Wild West is a Disney Junior television show and every episode has a song. The following is a list of songs.

== Soundtrack ==
A soundtrack containing Sheriff Callie's Wild West songs was released as an iTunes album on December 23, 2014, and then later released on CD format on June 30, 2015, containing 26 songs from the series.

== Season 1 songs ==
Episode Title	Song Title	Music By	Lyrics By	Songwriters/Composers
Horseshoe Peck	"Horseshoe Peck is the Best"	Mike Himelstein	Joe Ansolabehere & Mike Himelstein	Joe Ansolabehere, Mike Himelstein, Michael Turner
Callie's Gold Nugget	"Count On Us"	Mike Himelstein	Holly Huckins	Mike Himelstein, Holly Huckins, Lisa Kettle, Mike Turner
Train Bandits	"Chugga Chugga Choo Choo Train"	Mike Himelstein	Mike Himelstein & Ford Riley	Mike Himelstein, Ford Riley, Mike Turner
A Dirty Dusty Apology	"Sayin' I'm Sorry"	Mike Himelstein	Mike Himelstein & Krista Tucker	Mike Himelstein, Krista Tucker, Mike Turner
Tricky Trouble	"This Shirt Will Make Ya Strong"	Mike Himelstein	Mike Himelstein	Scott Gray, Mike Himelstein, Mike Turner
Toby's Untrue Achoo!	"Just a Little T.L.C."	Mike Himelstein	Kent Redeker & Mike Himelstein	Mike Himelstein, Kent Redeker, Mike Turner
Stagecoach Stand-Ins	"Who Could It Be?"	Mike Himelstein	Lisa Kettle	Mike Himelstein, Lisa Kettle, Krista Tucker, Mike Turner
Gold Mine Mix-Up	"There's No Gold in Tricky Mine"	Mike Himelstein	Joe Ansolabehere	Joe Ansolabehere, Mike Himelstein, Mike Turner
The Pesky Kangaroo Rat	"Pesky Little Critter"	Holly Huckins	Joe Ansolabehere & Holly Huckins	Joe Ansolabehere, Holly Huckins, Michael Turner
Cattle Overdrive	"Cattle Drive"	Mike Himelstein	Mike Himelstein & Scott Gray	Scott Gray, Mike Himelstein, Mike Turner
Sparky's Rival	"Sparky, Come Back to Me"	Mike Himelstein	Mike Himelstein	Mike Himelstein, Mike Turner
Jail Crazy	"By the Book"	Mike Himelstein	Carin Greenberg	Carin Greenberg, Mike Turner, Mike Himelstein
Toby Gets Nosy	"Picture Perfect"	Mike Himelstein & Kent Redeker	Mike Himelstein, Holly Huckins & Kent Redeker	Mike Himelstein, Holly Huckins, Kent Redeker, Mike Turner
Peck Takes It Back	"Apology Song"	Mike Himelstein	Mike Himelstein	Mike Himelstein, Mike Turner
Sparky's Lucky Day	"Amazing Lucky Scarf"	Mike Himelstein	Mike Himelstein	Mike Himelstein, Mike Turner
Peck's Bent Beak	"There's a Scary Looking Wolf in Town"	Mike Himelstein	Mike Himelstein & Holly Huckins	Mike Himelstein, Holly Huckins, Mike Turner
Toby the Cowsitter	"Milkshake Shake"	Kent Redeker	Kent Redeker	Kent Redeker, Mike Turner
Callie's Blue Jay Blues	"Ask for Help"	Mike Himelstein	Krista Tucker & Mike Himelstein	Mike Himelstein, Krista Tucker, Mike Turner
Peck's Darling Clementine	"If You Could Go Fast"	Mike Himelstein	Mike Himelstein	Mike Himelstein, Mike Turner
Lasso Come Home	"Wish I Could Do Tricks Like That"	Mike Himelstein	Mike Himelstein & Joe Ansolabehere	Joe Ansolabehere, Mike Himelstein, Mike Turner
Twist and Shout	"I Wish I'd Never Lied (Hero Song)"	Mike Himelstein	Ford Riley	Mike Himelstein, Ford Riley, Mike Turner
Calamity Priscilla	"The Spotlight"	Mike Himelstein	Mike Himelstein	Mike Himelstein, Krista Tucker, Mike Turner
King Stinky	"Those Peppers"	Mike Himelstein	Ford Riley & Krista Tucker	Mike Himelstein, Ford Riley, Krista Tucker, Mike Turner
Abigail's Extra Big Story	"Vanilla Plains"	Mike Himelstein	Mike Himelstein & Holly Huckins	Mike Himelstein, Holly Huckins, Michael Turner
Horsefeathers	"The Fabulous Fantastic Flying Mule"	Mike Himelstein	Ford Riley	Mike Himelstein, Ford Riley, Michael Turner
My Brother's Sleeper	"May the Best Brother Win"	Mike Himelstein	Krista Tucker	Krista Tucker, Mike Himelstein, Michael Turner
Callie Asks for Help	"Ridin'"	Mike Himelstein	Krista Tucker	Krista Tucker, Mike Himelstein, Michael Turner
Peck's Trail Mix Mix Up	"I'm Gonna Get to the Bottom of This"	Mike Himelstein	Krista Tucker & Joe Ansolabehere	Krista Tucker, Mike Himelstein, Joe Ansolabehere, Michael Turner
Priscilla's Lost Love Bird	"Super Shiny Deputy Star"	Mike Himelstein	Krista Tucker	Krista Tucker, Mike Himelstein, Michael Turner
Callie's Cowgirl Twirl	"Dancin' the Cowgirl Twirl"	Mike Himelstein	Krista Tucker	Krista Tucker, Mike Himelstein, Michael Turner
The Pie Thief	"The Pie Thief"	Mike Himelstein	Mike Himelstein	
Fool's Gold	"Big City"	Mike Himelstein	Mike Himelstein	
Peck and Toby's Big Yarn	"How Hard Can It Be to Knit?"	Mike Himelstein	Mike Himelstein	
My Fair Stinky	"That's How a Gentleman Does It"	Mike Himelstein	Mike Himelstein	Mike Himelstein, Holly Huckins, Mike Turner
Parroting Pedro	"We're Gonna Get Along Just Fine"	Mike Himelstein	Steve Sullivan & Andy Guerdat & Mike Himelstein	
Toby Gets the Scoop	"Gonna Find My Story"	Mike Himelstein	Mike Himelstein & Lisa Kettle	
Here Comes the Sun	"Hot Hot Heat"	Mike Himelstein	Ford Riley	
Bug Trouble	"Gotta Pick 'Em Fast"	Mike Himelstein	Mike Himelstein	
Moustache Toby	"My Moustache and Me"	Mike Himelstein	Ford Riley & Krista Tucker	
Doc's Cheatin' Chili	"The Whole Town's Cookin'"	Mike Himelstein	Mike Himelstein	
The Prickly Pair	"I Found a Prickly Pal"	Mike Himelstein	Kent Redeker	
Crystal Cave Caper	"I'm Not A-Scared Of Nothin'"	Mike Himelstein	Joe Ansolabehere	
Toby Braves the Bully	"You're Not a Tattletale"	Mike Himelstein	Mike Himelstein & Lisa Kettle	Mike Himelstein, Ford Riley, Mike Turner
The Tumbling Tumbleweed	"We're Gonna Clean Up Our Town"	Mike Himelstein	Mike Himelstein	Mike Himelstein, Holly Huckins, Mike Turner
Hike to Wish Mountain	"Follow Me"	Mike Himelstein	Mike Himelstein	
Rhymin' Rodeo	"Rustle Up That Rhyme"	Mike Himelstein	Lisa Kettle	

== Season 2 songs ==
Episode Title	Song Title	Music By	Lyrics By
Boots or Consequences	"The Bandit Life"	Mike Himelstein	Mike Himelstein & Holly Huckins
The Good, the Bad, and the Yo-Yo	"Ballad Of El Yo-Yo"	Mike Himelstein	Joe Ansolabehere
A Fistful of Flowers	"You'll Be Surprised"	Mike Himelstein	Mike Himelstein
Peck's Deputy Drill	"I Can Do Anything"	Mike Himelstein	Krista Tucker & Mike Himelstein
Quiltin' Time	"Founders Day Hoedown"	Mike Himelstein	Andy Guerdat, Steve Sullivan & Mike Himelstein
When Dirty Turned Purty	"Brother's Gone Clean"	Mike Himelstein	Andy Guerdat & Steve Sullivan
Barrel Full of Trouble	"Fixin' To Surprise 'Em"	Mike Himelstein	Mike Himelstein
Peck Clowns Around	"Rodeo Clown"	Mike Himelstein	Michele Gendelman & Ursula Ziegler
Toby's Christmas Critter	"A Critter I Can Ride"	Mike Himelstein	Andy Guerdat & Steve Sullivan
A Very Tricky Christmas	"The Christmas March" / "We'll Have A Nice And Friendly Christmas"	Mike Himelstein	Mike Himelstein
Bandit Toby	"Blame It On Toby"	Mike Himelstein	Chelsea Beyl
Barnstorming Bandit	"I Gotta Do Somethin'"	Mike Himelstein	Andy Guerdat & Mike Himelstein
Peck Gets Fooled	"Wait Til You See This Trick"	Mike Himelstein	Andy Guerdat & Steve Sullivan
Doc's Runaway Balloon	"Doc Knows It All"	Mike Himelstein	Mike Himelstein & Jean Ansolabehere
Sparky Runs Wild	"Play All Day"	Mike Himelstein	Mike Himelstein & Krista Tucker
Milkshake Shakedown	"Shake, Stir, & Serve With Pizzazz"	Mike Himelstein	Mike Himelstein
Toby's First Snow	"Snow Day"	Mike Himelstein	Steve Sullivan
Blazing Skaters	"Get Up And Try Again"	Mike Himelstein	Chelsea Beyl
The Long Adios	"Please Don't Leave Me"	Mike Himelstein	Andy Guerdat
Fire Engine Fuss	"Our New Fire Engine"	Mike Himelstein	Andy Guerdat & Steve Sullivan
Wrong Way Wagon Train	"Wagons Ho"	Mike Himelstein	Steve Sullivan & Mike Himelstein
Peck and Toby's Tall Twirl	"Now That I'm Tall"	Mike Himelstein	Mike Himelstein
The Prize Fight	"It's My Turn Now"	Mike Himelstein	Andy Guerdat
Buckle Hustle	"Gotta Get A Buckle"	Mike Himelstein	Michele Gendelman & Mike Himelstein
Peck's Prisoner Promise	"She Won't Stop"	Mike Himelstein	Mike Himelstein, Holly Huckins & Andy Guerdat
Toby's Two-Step Trouble	"Strut Our Stuff"	Mike Himelstein	Mike Himelstein & Kim Duran
The Ballad of Sweet Strings	"Songettes" / "Ballad Of Sweet Strings"	Mike Himelstein	Holly Huckins & Steve Sullivan / Steve Sullivan & Mike Himelstein
Lost Popcorn Cavern	"Popcorn And Glory"	Mike Himelstein	Bart Jennett & Mike Himelstein
Homestead Alone	"We Run This Town"	Mike Himelstein	Rachel Forman
Where's Our Wishing Well?	"My Wish For You"	Mike Himelstein	Steve Sullivan & Mike Himelstein
How the Water Was Won	"You Can Do It"	Mike Himelstein	Bart Jennett & Mike Himelstein
Double Trouble	"My Friend And I"	Mike Himelstein	Steve Sullivan, Andy Guerdat, Holly Huckins, Robert Lamoreaux & Michelle Lamoreaux
The Great Halloween Robbery	"Why We Love Halloween"	Mike Himelstein	Steve Sullivan & Mike Himelstein
The Ghost of the Scary Prairie	"The Ghost Of Scary Prairie"	Mike Himelstein	Andy Guerdat
Ella Sneaks a Peek	"There's A Present For Me"	Mike Himelstein	Joe Ansolabehere & Mike Himelstein
Tunnel of Trouble	"I'm Gonna Get Me Some Milk"	Mike Himelstein	Rachel Forman, Robert Lamoreaux & Michelle Lamoreaux
Stagecoach to Yonderville	"There's Always Room For More"	Mike Himelstein	Andy Guerdat
The Wild Brunch	"The Fastest Flipper"	Mike Himelstein	Scott Gray & Mike Himelstein
Callie's Got Trouble	"Everybody's Got Some Good In Them"	Mike Himelstein	Steve Sullivan & Holly Huckins
Outlaw Roundup	"I'm Gonna Be Big News"	Mike Himelstein	Krista Tucker
New Sheriff in Town	"New Sheriff In Town"	Mike Himelstein & Tim James	
Buzzard Bust-Out	"Nobody Flies Like Me"	Mike Himelstein	Andy Guerdat
The Heartless Valentine's Day	"Getting Valentines"	Mike Himelstein	Andy Guerdat & Mike Himelstein
Mine All Mine	"Mine All Mine"	Mike Himelstein	Scott Gray
