= I Wanna Be with You (album) =

Studio album (reissue) by Mandy Moore
- Released: May 5, 2000
- Recorded: 1999–2000
- Genre: Pop; teen pop
- Length: 47:08
- Label: Epic
- Producer: Ken Ross; Nick Trevisick; Soul Solution; Wade Robson; Peter Mansson; Jan Kask; Shaun Fisher; The Wasabees; Tony Moran; Rogers & Sturken

Mandy Moore chronology
So Real (1999)	I Wanna Be with You (2000)	Mandy Moore (2001)

Singles from I Wanna Be with You
- 1. "Candy" Released: February 20, 2000; 2. "I Wanna Be with You" Released: April 3, 2000; 3. "So Real" Released: June 13, 2000; 4. "Walk Me Home" Released: October 14, 2000

I Wanna Be with You is the reissue of American singer Mandy Moore's debut studio album, So Real (1999). It was released on May 5, 2000, through Epic Records, five months after the release of its parent album. Internationally, I Wanna Be with You was released as Moore's debut album as opposed to So Real. Upon its release, I Wanna Be with You garnered mixed reviews from music critics, with many deeming it an improvement over its predecessor So Real while also criticizing the album for containing previously released material. The album has sold over 805,000 copies in the United States and was certified gold.

Worldwide, the album was released in a variety of formats. All versions of the album contain five new songs but have varied track listings and content, most of which was first featured on the So Real album. The North American edition features three new remixes while other editions released worldwide omit these remixes and borrow more heavily from So Real.

Four singles were released from I Wanna Be With You. The first single from the album in the United States was the title track, "I Wanna Be with You". It was a moderate commercial success and peaked at number twenty-four on the US Billboard Hot 100. In Australia, the song peaked at number thirteen and was certified gold. Other singles released from the album were "Candy", "So Real", and "Walk Me Home".

== Background ==
Moore recorded four of the five new songs on I Wanna Be with You in the beginning of 2000. The album was quickly conceived following the recording of the title track and its inclusion on the Center Stage soundtrack. Scott Carter, senior director of product marketing for 550 Music said: "Instead of just releasing it on the soundtrack, we thought we'd like to do something special. We didn't feel like waiting the standard 18 months [to release another album]. With the remixes and the videos, we loaded up to bring more value to it. It happened very quickly." The new track "Everything My Heart Desires" is a cover of the 1999 single originally by Adam Rickitt. Other tracks new to the release were "Want You Back", "The Way to My Heart", and "Your Face". "Let Me Be the One", which was previously included on So Real, is a cover of the 1985 single originally by Five Star and appears on the Japanese and Asian editions of I Wanna Be with You.

The album was intended to feature a more mature side to Moore. Moore explained: "I've grown as a person. Obviously, I'm a more confident person and performer, and I don't know if 'Candy' was representing me as well anymore. Maybe at that point it was. I still don't think it was where I wanted to go with my music."

== Release ==
I Wanna Be with You was released in numerous editions worldwide. In North America, the album followed the release of So Real five months prior. The album was marketed as "a new version of Mandy's debut", containing five new songs, three remixes, and four songs from So Real. Internationally, I Wanna Be with You was released as Moore's debut album as opposed to So Real. These international editions omit the remixes and borrow more heavily from So Real but still contain the five new songs. The European and Australian editions of the album have an alternative track list and feature eight songs from So Real. The Japanese edition of the album also has an alternate track list and features all of the songs from So Real except "Love Shot". A version distributed by Sony Music Asia in other Asian countries such as Taiwan and Malaysia feature the same initial track list as So Real and contain all of the songs originally featured on the album, but add the five new tracks at the end as bonus tracks. The Australian release of I Wanna Be with You has the same cover photograph as the one featured on So Real. Worldwide, releases that were issued on compact disc are enhanced CDs containing the music videos for "Candy" and "Walk Me Home" alongside an electronic press kit.

=== Singles ===
In the United Kingdom and Australia, where the So Real album was not released, "Candy" was marketed as the first single from I Wanna Be with You. The single peaked at number six on the UK Singles Chart and spent 14 weeks on the chart. In Australia, the single spent 18 weeks on the ARIA charts, peaked at number two, and was certified Platinum.

In the United States, "I Wanna Be with You" was the first single released from the album and as a single from the soundtrack to the 2000 film Center Stage on April 3, 2000. It spent 16 weeks on the Billboard Hot 100 and peaked at number 24 in its ninth week on the chart. In the UK, it was released as the second single from the album, spent five weeks on the chart, and peaked at number 21, becoming her second and final single to chart in the country. The single was more successful in Australia, where it was released as the third single from the album in September 2000. It spent 19 weeks on the ARIA charts, peaked at number 13, and was certified Gold.

"So Real" was released as the second single from the album in Australia (but third single overall) on June 13, 2000. It spent 11 weeks on the ARIA charts and peaked at number 21.

"Walk Me Home" was first released on December 4, 1999, as the second single in the US from So Real, but did not chart. In October 2000, the song was re-released to promote I Wanna Be with You and peaked at number 38 on the Billboard Pop Airplay chart, spending two weeks on the chart.

== Critical reception ==
Professional ratings
Review scores
Source	Rating
AllMusic	3/5 stars
Amazon	mixed
Dotmusic	4/5 stars
Rhapsody	mixed
Q	3/5 stars

The album received generally mixed reviews from music critics. Many reviewers were critical of the album containing material from So Real, with Rickey Wright from Amazon writing that the album was released "mainly to ride the success of its title single" and Rolling Stone describing the album as "reconfigured, slightly improved reissue" of So Real. Stephen Thomas Erlewine of AllMusic called the album a "crass marketing move" and Linda Ryan of Rhapsody described the release as "ostentatious". Despite this, both Erlewine and Ryan described the album as stronger than its predecessor. Erlewine noted that the album contained "all [the] essential ingredients for a good teen pop album" and Ryan described the remixes on the album as "slick and radio-friendly". Wright was critical of the Wade Robson remixes, calling them "inferior", and described So Real as "the better of her releases".

Danny Scott from Q compared the album to works of Christina Aguilera and Britney Spears, describing it as "predictably polished and irrepressibly upbeat". Sean Richardson from The Boston Phoenix wrote "Moore’s vocals are both stronger and more understated than Britney’s, but her material has far less personality." James Roberts from Dotmusic described the production style on the album as being different from the works of Spears, writing "there is more to Mandy than most who heard 'Candy' would give her credit for."

== Commercial performance ==
I Wanna Be with You debuted at number 21 on the US Billboard 200, selling 58,000 copies in its first week. In July 2000, it was certified gold in the US for shipments of 500,000 copies. By June 2009, it had sold over 805,000 copies in the country.

In New Zealand, the album peaked at number six.

== Track listing ==
No.	Title	Writer(s)	Producer(s)	Length
1.	"I Wanna Be with You"	Tiffany Arbuckle; Shelly Peiken; Keith Thomas; Dominic Riccitello	Keith Thomas	4:13
2.	"Everything My Heart Desires"	Karsten Dahlgaard; Michael Jay; Johnny Pedersen	Cory Rooney; Dan Shea	3:41
3.	"Want You Back"	Lisa Lindebergh; Peter Mansson	Peter Mansson	3:18
4.	"The Way to My Heart"	Dahlgaard; Pedersen; Paul Rein	Rooney; Shea	3:39
5.	"So Real" (Wade Robson Remix)	Tony Battaglia; Shaun Fisher	The Wasabees; Wade Robson^{[a]}	3:44
6.	"Lock Me in Your Heart"	Battaglia; Fisher	The Wasabees	3:33
7.	"Walk Me Home"	Battaglia; Fisher	The Wasabees	4:22
8.	"I Like It"	Howie Dorough; Mike Lorello; Tony Moran; Denise Rich	Tony Moran	4:26
9.	"So Real"	Battaglia; Fisher	The Wasabees	3:50
10.	"Candy" (Wade Robson Remix)	Battaglia; Jive Jones; Dave Katz; Rich	JIVE; Charlie; The Wasabees; Robson^{[a]}	3:38
11.	"Your Face"	David Rice; Mark Stevens	Nick Trevisick; David Rice	4:17
12.	"I Wanna Be with You" (Soul Solution Remix)	Arbuckle; Peiken; Thomas	Thomas; Soul Solution^{[a]}	4:19
Total length:				47:08

European and Australian edition
No.	Title	Writer(s)	Producer(s)	Length
1.	"I Wanna Be with You"	Arbuckle; Peiken; Thomas; Riccitello	Thomas	5:02
2.	"Candy"	Battaglia; Katz; Jones; Rich	JIVE; Charlie; The Wasabees	3:55
3.	"What You Want"	Battaglia; Fisher; Skip Masland	The Wasabees	3:41
4.	"So Real"	Battaglia; Fisher	The Wasabees	3:50
5.	"Everything My Heart Desires"	Dahlgaard; Jay; Pedersen	Rooney; Shea	3:41
6.	"Want You Back"	Lindebergh; Mansson	Mansson	3:18
7.	"The Way to My Heart"	Dahlgaard; Pedersen; Rein	Rooney; Shea	3:40
8.	"Lock Me in Your Heart"	Battaglia; Fisher	The Wasabees	3:32
9.	"Telephone (Interlude)/Quit Breaking My Heart"	Battaglia; Fisher	The Wasabees	4:08
10.	"Walk Me Home"	Battaglia; Fisher	The Wasabees	4:23
11.	"Love You for Always"	Battaglia; Fisher	The Wasabees	3:21
12.	"I Like It"	Dorough; Lorello; Moran; Rich	Moran	4:26
13.	"Your Face"	Rice; Stevens	Trevisick; Rice	4:18
Total length:				47:54

Japanese edition
No.	Title	Writer(s)	Producer(s)	Length
1.	"I Wanna Be with You"	Arbuckle; Peiken; Thomas; Riccitello	Thomas	4:13
2.	"Candy"	Battaglia, Katz, Jones, Rich	JIVE, Charlie, The Wasabees	3:56
3.	"So Real"	Battaglia, Fisher	The Wasabees	3:51
4.	"What You Want"	Battaglia, Fisher, Masland	The Wasabees	3:42
5.	"Walk Me Home"	Battaglia, Fisher	The Wasabees	4:23
6.	"Lock Me in Your Heart"	Battaglia, Fisher	The Wasabees	3:31
7.	"Telephone (Interlude)"			0:15
8.	"Quit Breaking My Heart"	Battaglia, Fisher	The Wasabees	3:53
9.	"Let Me Be the One"	Ian Foster	The Wasabees	3:50
10.	"Not Too Young"	Battaglia, Obie Morant	The Wasabees	3:52
11.	"I Like It"	Dorough, Lorello, Moran, Rich	Moran	4:26
12.	"Love You for Always"	Battaglia, Fisher	The Wasabees	3:22
13.	"Everything My Heart Desires"	Dahlgaard, Jay, Pedersen	Rooney, Shea	3:41
14.	"Want You Back"	Lindebergh, Mansson	Mansson	3:18
15.	"The Way to My Heart"	Dahlgaard, Pedersen, Rein	Rooney, Shea	3:39
16.	"Your Face"	Rice, Stevens	Trevisick, Rice	4:17
17.	"Quit Breaking My Heart (Reprise)"	Battaglia, Fisher	The Wasabees	1:01
Total length:				59:10

Asian edition
No.	Title	Writer(s)	Producer(s)	Length
1.	"So Real"	Battaglia, Fisher	The Wasabees	3:51
2.	"Candy"	Battaglia, Katz, Jones, Rich	JIVE, Charlie, The Wasabees	3:56
3.	"What You Want"	Battaglia, Fisher, Masland	The Wasabees	3:42
4.	"Walk Me Home"	Battaglia, Fisher	The Wasabees	4:23
5.	"Lock Me in Your Heart"	Battaglia, Fisher	The Wasabees	3:31
6.	"Telephone (Interlude)"			0:15
7.	"Quit Breaking My Heart"	Battaglia, Fisher	The Wasabees	3:53
8.	"Let Me Be the One"	Foster	The Wasabees	3:50
9.	"Not Too Young"	Battaglia, Morant	The Wasabees	3:52
10.	"Love Shot"	Carl Sturken, Evan Rogers	Sturken, Rogers	4:24
11.	"I Like It"	Dorough, Lorello, Moran, Rich	Moran	4:26
12.	"Love You for Always"	Battaglia, Fisher	The Wasabees	3:22
13.	"Quit Breaking My Heart (Reprise)"	Battaglia, Fisher	The Wasabees	1:01
14.	"I Wanna Be with You"	Arbuckle, Peiken, Thomas, Riccitello	Keith Thomas	4:13
15.	"Everything My Heart Desires"	Dahlgaard, Jay, Pedersen	Rooney, Shea	3:41
16.	"Want You Back"	Lindebergh, Mansson	Peter Mansson	3:18
17.	"The Way to My Heart"	Dahlgaard, Pedersen, Rein	Rooney, Shea	3:39
18.	"Your Face"	Rice, Stevens	Trevisick, Rice	4:17
Total length:				63:35

Notes

- ^{^a} signifies a remixer

== Personnel ==
Credits for I Wanna Be with You adapted from AllMusic.

- Mandy Moore – primary artist
- Tiffany Arbuckle – backing vocals
- Alan Armitage – assistant engineer
- Chris Athens – mastering
- Eric Bickel – assistant engineer
- Chris Braide – guitar
- Dakari – guest artist
- Jive – guest artist
- Billy Lawrence – guest artist
- Alice Butts – design
- Tom Coyne – mastering
- Richard Dodd – cello
- Fraser T. Smith – guitar
- Terry Glenny – violin
- Eric Gorfain – string arrangements, violin
- Kenny Greenberg – electric guitar
- David Guerrero – assistant engineer
- Bobby Guy – producer
- Roland Hartwell – violin
- José Juan Sánchez – assistant
- Shaun Shankel – digital editing, editing, production coordination
- Dan Shea – keyboards, producer, programming
- Roger Sommers – engineer, mixing
- Manelich Sotolong – assistant engineer
- Soul Solution – producer
- Tom Tally – viola
- Keith Thomas – arranger, bass, drum programming, acoustic guitar, producer, programming, synthesizer, synthesizer programming
- Nick Trevisick – producer, programming
- Marcy Vaj – violin
- Bill Whittington – engineer, mixing
- Robb Williams – engineer
- John Yoakum – flute, oboe
- Dan Muckala – programming
- David Palmer – drums
- Julian Peploe – art direction
- Wade Robson – producer, remix producer
- Corey Rooney – keyboards, mixing, producer, programming
- Ken Ross – executive producer
- Jose Sanchez – programming

== Charts ==
=== Weekly charts ===
Weekly chart performance for I Wanna Be with You
Chart (2000)	Peak position
Australian Albums (ARIA)	55
Japanese Albums (Oricon)	49
New Zealand Albums (RMNZ)	6
Scottish Albums (Official Charts)	66
UK Albums (Official Charts)	52
US Billboard 200	21

=== Year-end charts ===
Year-end chart performance for I Wanna Be with You
Chart (2000)	Position
US Billboard 200	162

== Certifications ==
Certifications for I Wanna Be with You
Region	Certification	Certified units/sales
United States (RIAA)	Gold	805,000
