= Soul Solution =

Musical group

Soul Solution is a house/electronic dance music production duo from New York City formed by Bobby Guy and Ernie Lake.

== Biography ==
As artists they made six appearances on the Billboard Hot Dance Music/Club Play chart.

Five times under the Soul Solution name:

- (1994) "Love, Peace & Happiness" (#29)
- (1996) "Find a Way" (#4)
- (1996) "Can't Stop Love" (#3)
- (1999) "Let It Rain" (featuring Carolyn Harding) (#2)
- (2000) "All Around the World" (featuring Carolyn Harding) (#4)

Once under the name So Pure! featuring Sheleen Thomas:

- (1999) "Changes" (#1)

== See also ==
- List of number-one dance hits (United States)
- List of artists who reached number one on the US Dance chart
