= Mandy Moore =

American actress and singer (born 1984)

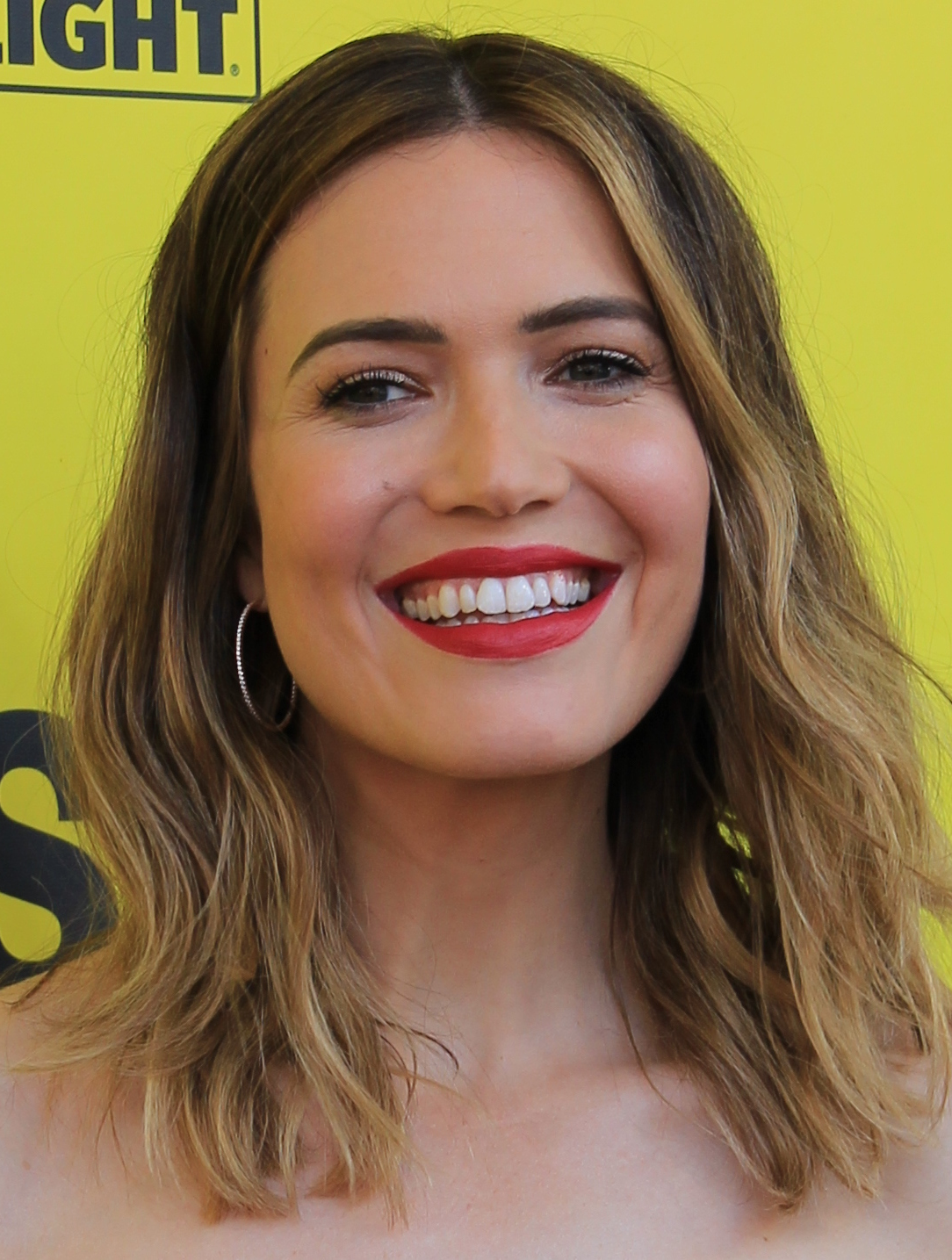
- Moore at the 2018 South by Southwest
- Born: Amanda Leigh Moore; April 10, 1984 (age 42); Nashua, New Hampshire, U.S.
- Education: Bishop Moore High School
- Occupations: Singer; songwriter; actress
- Years active: 1993–present
- Spouses: Ryan Adams (m. 2009; div. 2016); Taylor Goldsmith (m. 2018)
- Children: 3
- Awards: Full list
- Musical career
- Origin: Longwood, Florida, U.S.
- Genres: Pop; pop rock; dance-pop
- Instrument: Vocals
- Labels: Epic; Sony; Sire; Warner; Firm Music; EMI; Storefront; Red; Verve Forecast; Walt Disney

Amanda Leigh Moore (born April 10, 1984) is an American singer-songwriter and actress. She rose to fame with her 1999 debut single "Candy", which peaked at number 41 on the Billboard Hot 100. Her debut album, So Real (1999), received Platinum certification from the Recording Industry Association of America (RIAA). The song "I Wanna Be with You" from the reissue album I Wanna Be With You (2000), became Moore's first Top 40 single, peaking at 24. Moore then released the albums Mandy Moore (2001), Coverage (2003), Wild Hope (2007), Amanda Leigh (2009), Silver Landings (2020), and In Real Life (2022).

Moore had a minor voice role in 2001 in the film Dr. Dolittle 2, before playing a supporting role in the comedy The Princess Diaries. She received recognition for her starring role in the romantic drama A Walk to Remember (2002). Her subsequent film credits include How to Deal (2003), Chasing Liberty (2004), Saved! (2004), Racing Stripes (2005), Because I Said So (2007), License to Wed (2007), Love, Wedding, Marriage (2011), 47 Meters Down (2017), The Darkest Minds (2018), and Midway (2019). She voiced Rapunzel in the Disney animated musical fantasy film Tangled (2010).

From 2016 to 2022, she starred as Rebecca Pearson in the NBC family drama series This Is Us, receiving nominations for a Golden Globe Award and a Primetime Emmy Award. In 2019, she received a star on the Hollywood Walk of Fame.

== Early life ==
Amanda Leigh Moore was born on April 10, 1984, in Nashua, New Hampshire, to Stacy (née Friedman), a former news reporter who once worked for the Orlando Sentinel, and Donald Moore, a pilot for American Airlines. Moore grew up Catholic, but by 2004 had stopped religion to embrace a belief system which she described as a "hodgepodge of things". She is of Irish, English, and Russian-Jewish descent. She has an older brother, Scott, and a younger brother, Kyle. When Moore was two months old, she and her family moved to Longwood, Florida, a suburb of Orlando, because of her father's job. She attended Park Maitland School, where she discovered her "passion for singing and the stage." From 1998 to 1999, Moore went to Bishop Moore Catholic High School in College Park (Orlando). Moore is the step-sister of actress Carly Craig. Her brothers and mother are gay.

== Career ==
=== 1993–1999: Career beginnings ===
Moore became interested in singing and acting at a young age, and called her British maternal grandmother, Eileen Friedman, a professional ballerina in London, one of her inspirations. Moore said "My parents thought it was just a phase I'd grow out of. But I stuck to it and begged them for acting lessons, for voice lessons."

Moore began acting in lead roles in local productions and performing the national anthem at events in Orlando. She was twelve years old when she went to the Stagedoor Manor performing arts camp. Production director Konnie Kittrell said that Moore "... was a quiet, sweet girl", earning a number of solos, but "She wasn't a spotlight seeker."

When Moore was thirteen she began working on music. One day while recording in an Orlando studio, she was overheard by Victor Cade, a delivery man who had a friend in A&R at Epic Records. Cade sent him a copy of Moore's unfinished demo, and Moore signed on with the label.

=== 1999–2000: So Real, MTV stardom, and I Wanna Be with You ===
Moore began working on her debut album when she was fourteen. She had to leave school when she was in the ninth grade, but continued her education through tutors. In the summer of 1999, Moore began touring with the boy band NSYNC. Later in 1999, Moore toured with the Backstreet Boys.

Moore's debut single, "Candy", was released in the US on August 17, 1999, when she was fifteen. The single was a commercial success, and has been compared to the singles of fellow teen pop singers Jessica Simpson, Christina Aguilera, and Britney Spears. It debuted at number 88 on the Billboard Hot 100, before peaking at number 41 on the chart. The single later received a Gold certification from the Recording Industry Association of America (RIAA), for sales exceeding 500,000 copies in the U.S. The single was highly popular in Australia, where it peaked at number 2 on the ARIA Charts and received a Platinum certification. Moore began to host and VJ at MTV, contributing to numerous shows including Total Request Live, Say What? Karaoke, and her own talk show which was originally called The Mandy Moore Show before being retitled as Mandy.

Moore's debut album, So Real, was released on December 7, 1999, by 550 Music through Epic Records. The album received a limited release in a few countries. It received generally mixed reviews from critics when it was released, and Moore continued to be compared to more successful teen pop singers. Allmusic said about the album, "Fifteen-year-old Mandy Moore's debut album sounded like it was inspired almost entirely by listening to recent hit albums by 'N Sync, the Backstreet Boys, and Britney Spears." Entertainment Weekly had a similar opinion about the album, and gave it a C− in their review. The album debuted at number 77 on the Billboard 200 chart. It continued to climb the chart until it peaked at number 31. It received a Platinum certification from the RIAA, for sales exceeding one million copies in the US.

Before promotion for So Real had ended, Moore began working on more music. The single "I Wanna Be with You", was released on April 3, 2000. "I Wanna Be with You" spent sixteen weeks on the chart and reached its peak of 24 during its ninth week on the chart. The song became her first Top 20 hit on the Billboard Pop Songs chart, where it peaked at number 11. The single became Moore's second Top 20 hit in Australia, where it peaked at number 13. It was a minor success on the German Media Control Charts, where it peaked at number 70. The single received mixed reviews. Billboard praised the song and said, "Top 40 programmers and listeners alike will love Moore more with this track", and Allmusic called the song a highlight track from the album.

A reissue of So Real, titled I Wanna Be with You, was released on May 9, 2000. Marketed as "a new version of Mandy's debut", the album was a compilation of new songs, remixes, and songs from So Real. Internationally, where the So Real album was not released, I Wanna Be with You served as Moore's debut album, with multiple alternative track listings. The album received generally mixed reviews and was criticized for not being a true follow-up. AllMusic called the album "trashier, flashier, gaudier, and altogether more disposable" than its predecessor So Real. The album was a commercial success, debuting and peaking at number 21 on the U.S. Billboard 200 chart. It received a Gold certification from the RIAA for sales exceeding 500,000 copies in the United States. Moore won the Kids' Choice Awards for Favorite Rising Star for the album in 2000. "Walk Me Home" was re-released in the United States as the second single from I Wanna Be with You and was slightly more successful than its original release, peaking at number 38 on the Billboard Pop Songs chart. The final single from the album, "So Real" was released in selected territories on June 13, 2000. In Australia, the single became her second Top 40 hit, peaking at number 21 on the ARIA Charts. The single peaked at number 18 on the Official New Zealand Music Chart.

=== 2001–2002: Mandy Moore and early acting roles ===
In 2001, Moore began working on her second album, which was said to move away from the bubblegum pop sound and image she became known for. She told Billboard magazine that "All of the music has started to look and sound the same", prompting her to move in a different direction. Moore mentioned wanting to feature more live instruments when performing, and wanted "no more dancers, no more singing to tracks. I got tired of that in a big way".

The album's lead single, "In My Pocket", was released on May 29, 2001. Entertainment Weekly said the single had "pumping, Indian-influenced Eurodisco". It failed to chart on the Billboard Hot 100 in the U.S., but reached number 2 on the Billboard Bubbling Under Hot 100 Singles chart, and it hit number 21 on the Billboard Pop Songs chart. The song became her third Top 20 hit in Australia, where it peaked at number 11 on the ARIA Charts.

Moore's second album, Mandy Moore, was released on June 19, 2001. The album had uptempo dance and pop songs and influences from Middle Eastern music. The album received mixed reviews from critics. AllMusic called the album a "lush, layered production". The album debuted and peaked at number 35 on the Billboard 200 chart, and received a Gold certification from the RIAA. The album has sold an estimated 1.5 million copies worldwide. The album reached number 37 on the ARIA charts in Australia, her highest peak in that country. The album's second single, "Crush", was released on August 28, 2001; it peaked at number 35 on the Billboard Pop Songs chart, and it climbed to number 25 on the ARIA Charts.

Moore made her feature film debut in 2001, in which she voiced a bear cub in the comedy Dr. Dolittle 2, which starred Eddie Murphy. Later that year, Moore co-starred with Anne Hathaway in the comedy The Princess Diaries, based on Meg Cabot's novel The Princess Diaries, and was released on August 3, 2001. She played Lana Thomas, the rival of Mia Thermopolis (Hathaway). On her role, Moore told InStyle Magazine, "I'm the crude popular girl who gets ice cream in her face." The film received mixed reviews. Rotten Tomatoes reported that 47% of 113 sampled critics gave the film positive reviews and that it got a rating average of 5.2 out of 10. In the film, Moore performed a cover of Connie Francis's 1958 song "Stupid Cupid" while at a beach party.

In 2002, Moore made her starring debut with Shane West and Peter Coyote in the romantic drama A Walk to Remember, based on Nicholas Sparks's novel A Walk to Remember. She played Jamie Sullivan, the unpopular daughter of Reverend Sullivan (Coyote). The film opened at number 3 at the U.S. box office raking in $12,177,488 in its opening weekend. The film received generally negative reviews. Roger Ebert of the Chicago Sun-Times praised Moore and West's "quietly convincing" performances. It was a modest box office success, earning $41,281,092 in the U.S., and was a sleeper hit in Asia. The total revenue generated worldwide was $47,494,916. Moore received several nominations and awards for her performance in the film. Commenting about it in 2010, she said: "It was my first movie and I know people say it may be cliché and it's a tearjerker or it's cheesy, but for me, it's the thing I'm most proud of."

=== 2003–2006: Coverage and continued acting ===
In 2003, Moore began working on her third album; a covers album called Coverage. The album had covers of 1970s and 1980s songs and was produced by John Fields. Moore's cover of John Hiatt's 1987 song "Have a Little Faith in Me" was released as the album's lead single shortly before the album. The song peaked at number 39 on the Billboard Pop Songs chart but did not enter the Billboard Hot 100. Coverage was released on October 21, 2003, and received generally mixed reviews. AllMusic called the album a "leap to musical maturity," Entertainment Weekly called it an "effort to shed her bubblegum-blond image." The album debuted at number 14 on the Billboard 200 chart, with first week sales of 53,000. This made it Moore's highest debut on the chart and highest-peaking album, but was also her lowest-selling and her first album not to be certified by the Recording Industry Association of America (RIAA). Moore's cover of XTC's 1982 song "Senses Working Overtime" was released as the album's second single but did not appear on any chart. Later that year, Moore's cover of Carole King's 1971 song "I Feel the Earth Move" was included on the compilation album Love Rocks from LGBT rights supporters.

In 2004, Moore left Epic after five years because of creative differences. The label released her greatest hits album, The Best of Mandy Moore, on November 16, 2004, to close out her contract. The album reached number 148 on the Billboard 200. Moore's third compilation album, Candy, was released on April 5, 2005.

In 2003, Moore co-starred with Allison Janney, Peter Gallagher, and Trent Ford in the romantic comedy-drama How to Deal which was based on Sarah Dessen's novels That Summer and Someone like You. She played Halley Martin, a cynical and rebellious seventeen-year-old who deals with falling in love with Macon Forrester (Ford), the new boy at her school and her relationships and issues with her family and friends. The film failed to find teenage audiences in the U.S. and grossed a total of $14 million domestically.

In 2004, Moore co-starred with Matthew Goode in the romantic comedy Chasing Liberty. She played Anna Foster, the rebellious eighteen-year-old "First Daughter" who wants more freedom from the Secret Service. The film grossed approximately $12 million. Both How to Deal and Chasing Liberty received generally negative reviews, respectively. Ebert singled Moore's performances out again and said in his review of How to Deal that Moore has "an unaffected natural charm" and "almost makes the movie worth seeing." In his review of Chasing Liberty he said that she has "undeniable screen presence and inspires instant affection." Other critics called her an "actress of limited range," but one review of Chasing Liberty called her the "most painless of former pop princesses." Late in 2004, Moore co-starred with Jena Malone, Macaulay Culkin and Patrick Fugit in the religion satirical comedy-drama Saved!. She played Hilary Faye Stockard, a proper and popular girl at a Christian high school. The film received generally positive reviews; it did not receive a wide release. Moore's performance was praised, with one critic calling her a "demented delight". She and Michael Stipe covered the Beach Boys' 1966 song "God Only Knows", which bookended the film.

In 2005, Moore co-starred in the sports family comedy-drama Racing Stripes, in which she voiced Sandy the white horse, and she guest-starred in the HBO comedy-drama Entourage. Moore was originally scheduled to star in the films Cursed, Havoc and The Upside of Anger, which were all eventually released in 2005, but without her involvement in any of them.

In 2006, Moore guest-starred as Julie Quinn in two episodes of the fifth season of the NBC medical sitcom Scrubs, that were the ninth episode "My Half-Acre" and the tenth episode "Her Story II". The same year, she guest-starred in the Fox animated sitcom The Simpsons, in which she voiced Tabitha Vixx in the seventeenth-season finale called "Marge and Homer Turn a Couple Play".

Moore co-starred with Hugh Grant, Dennis Quaid and William Dafoe in Paul Weitz's satirical comedy American Dreamz, which was released in April 2006. She played Sally Kendoo, a sociopathic contestant in a singing competition series modeled after American Idol. Weitz said that he had Moore in mind for the role before she was cast, explaining that "there's something inherently sweet about Mandy; it makes it all the more interesting to see her in a villainess role." Moore has said that she enjoys playing mean-spirited characters, but fears being typecast as a villain. The film opened at number 9 at the U.S. box office, bringing in $7 million, and it received generally mixed reviews. Owen Gleiberman of Entertainment Weekly praised Moore's and Grant's "wicked barbed chemistry" in their roles, but Robert Koehler of Variety called Moore's role a "pitch-perfect study of a woman for whom a reality show is reality."

Later in 2006, Moore voiced Nita, the heroine of the Disney animated sequel Brother Bear 2, which was released directly to DVD on August 29, 2006. ComingSoon.net praised Moore's "surprisingly good performance". That same year, Moore was originally cast in Emilio Estevez's drama Bobby, but was replaced by Mary Elizabeth Winstead.

=== 2007–2009: Wild Hope and Amanda Leigh ===
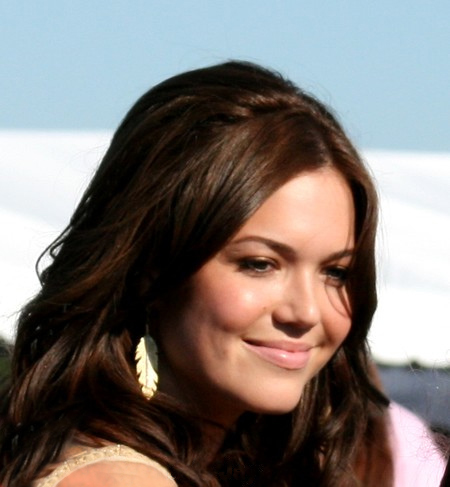
Moore at the Bridgehampton Polo Club in eastern Long Island, New York, August 2007

In early 2006, Moore said that she missed her music career and that singing is what she was the "most passionate about". In 2004, Moore signed with Sire Records after her contract with Epic ended, but she left the label in May 2006 because of creative differences. She signed with The Firm Music, owned by EMI, in July that year, calling her recording contract "especially exciting", and saying that she left Sire because she did not want to "follow the mainstream", but rather have "complete control and freedom" over her music.

Moore co-starred with Diane Keaton, Gabriel Macht and Tom Everett Scott in the romantic comedy Because I Said So. The film was released on February 2, 2007, it was a financial success, earning $69 million worldwide at the box office. Reviews were generally negative. Later that year, Moore co-starred with John Krasinski and Robin Williams in the romantic comedy License to Wed which was released on July 3, 2007. The film received overwhelmingly negative reviews but was a financial success, grossing $43.8 million domestically and $69.3 million worldwide. Variety called the film "an astonishingly flat romantic comedy, filled with perplexing choices", but called Moore's performance "appealing".

On September 24, 2007, Moore guest-starred in the CBS sitcom How I Met Your Mother in the third-season premiere episode "Wait for It". Later that year, she co-starred with Billy Crudup, Tom Wilkinson and Dianne Wiest in the romantic comedy Dedication. She played Lucy Reilly, a struggling children's book illustrator who falls in love with Henry Roth (Crudup). The film premiered at the 2007 Sundance Film Festival and received mixed reviews from critics.

Moore's fourth studio album Wild Hope was released on June 19, 2007, and Moore collaborated with record producer John Alagía and a number of musicians on it, including Chantal Kreviazuk, Lori McKenna, Rachael Yamagata and The Weepies. Moore stayed alone in a house in Woodstock in Upstate New York while recording the album in late 2006. Moore performed the album's lead single "Extraordinary" at the Brick Awards on April 12, 2007, and launched a tour in the summer of 2007.

The album received mixed to positive reviews from critics. Billboard said that "Wild Hope is the gratifying sound of a singer finally finding her comfort zone. Gone is the sugary pop of Moore's early career, replaced instead by thoughtful musings on love and life…an album full of subtle, but undeniable hooks." The album debuted on the U.S. Billboard 200 at #30, selling 25,000 copies the first week of its release, according to Billboard. The album also reached No. 9 on The Top Internet albums. To date, the album has sold over 120,000 copies in the U.S. and more than 350,000 copies worldwide. On February 23, 2008, Moore released the album in Australia, and subsequently toured with musician Ben Lee and the West Australian Symphony Orchestra in Western Australia, supporting inaugural American Idol winner Kelly Clarkson on her tour.

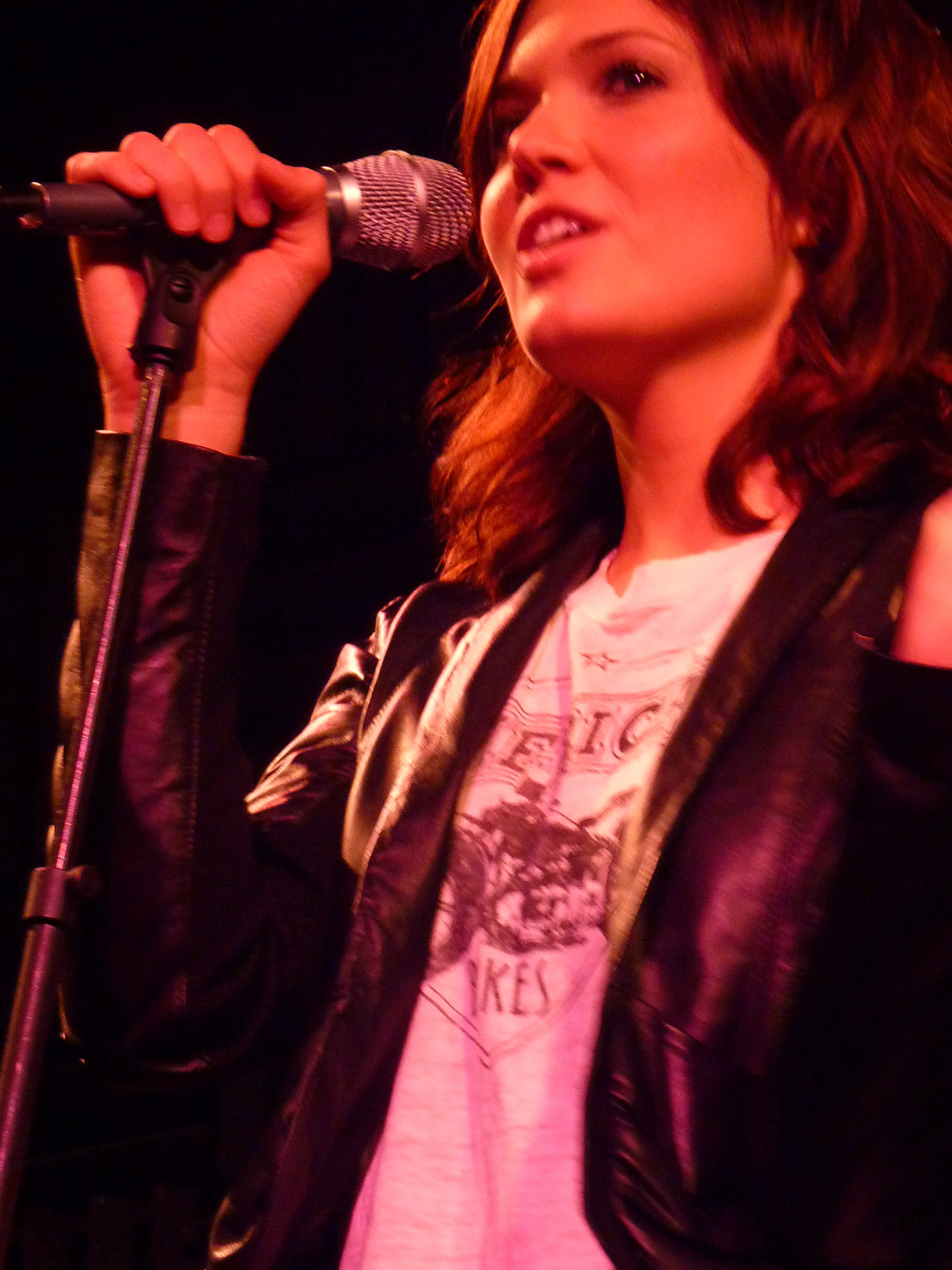
Moore performing at Joe's Pub in Manhattan, New York, June 2009

Moore began working on her fifth studio album Amanda Leigh in 2008. Recording sessions for the album took place around December 2008 in Boston, Massachusetts with singer-songwriter, record producer, pianist, and guitarist Mike Viola. The album's lead single "I Could Break Your Heart Any Day of the Week" was released on March 17, 2009, and its music video premiered on April 20, 2009, on Yahoo! Music. The single failed to have an impact on any major charts.

Amanda Leigh was released on May 26, 2009. On the album, Moore said, "The music is all a reflection of me now, not somebody else's choices." To promote the release, Moore visited a number of talk shows, performing "I Could Break Your Heart Any Day of the Week" on shows including The Ellen DeGeneres Show and The Tonight Show with Jay Leno. On May 26, 2009, she performed songs from the album at Amoeba Music in Hollywood. The album received generally positive reviews. Time magazine called the album "impeccably recorded". An article on the album by Paper magazine said, "Mandy (in the album)... shows real thoughtful and emotional depth." Paper finished by saying that "Moore is a far better musician than she's often given credit for." It debuted at number 25 on the Billboard 200, selling 16,000 copies in the U.S. during the week of its release, and at number 4 on the Top Independent albums chart. To date, the album has sold an estimated 100,000 copies. The album was recorded just prior to Moore's marriage to musician Ryan Adams and was her final album for over ten years.

=== 2010–2015: Tangled and further acting ===
After a break of almost two years from film roles, Moore co-starred with Martin Freeman in the romantic comedy Swinging with the Finkels. The film was shot in the United Kingdom in 2009 and was released in 2011. Moore co-starred with Kellan Lutz in the romantic comedy Love, Wedding, Marriage. The film was shot in 2010 and released in 2011. In 2010, Moore made a guest-starring appearance as Mary Portman in the ABC medical drama Grey's Anatomy, for the two-part sixth-season finale, her first television role since 2007. She returned to the show for two episodes of the seventh season.

Also that year, Moore co-starred with Zachary Levi where she voiced Rapunzel in the CGI Disney animated fantasy musical comedy Tangled. The film received generally positive reviews from critics. Rotten Tomatoes reported that 89% of critics have given the film a positive review based on 185 reviews, with an average score of 7.5/10. The site's consensus read: "While far from Disney's greatest film, Tangled is a visually stunning, thoroughly entertaining addition to the studio's classic animated canon." Another review aggregator Metacritic, which assigned a weighted average score from 0–100 out of reviews from mainstream film critics, calculated a score of 71 based on 34 reviews. CinemaScore polled conducted during the opening weekend revealed the average grade cinemagoers gave the film was an "A+" on an A+ to F scale. It earned $200,821,936 in North America, and $389,900,000 in other countries, for a worldwide total of $590,721,936.

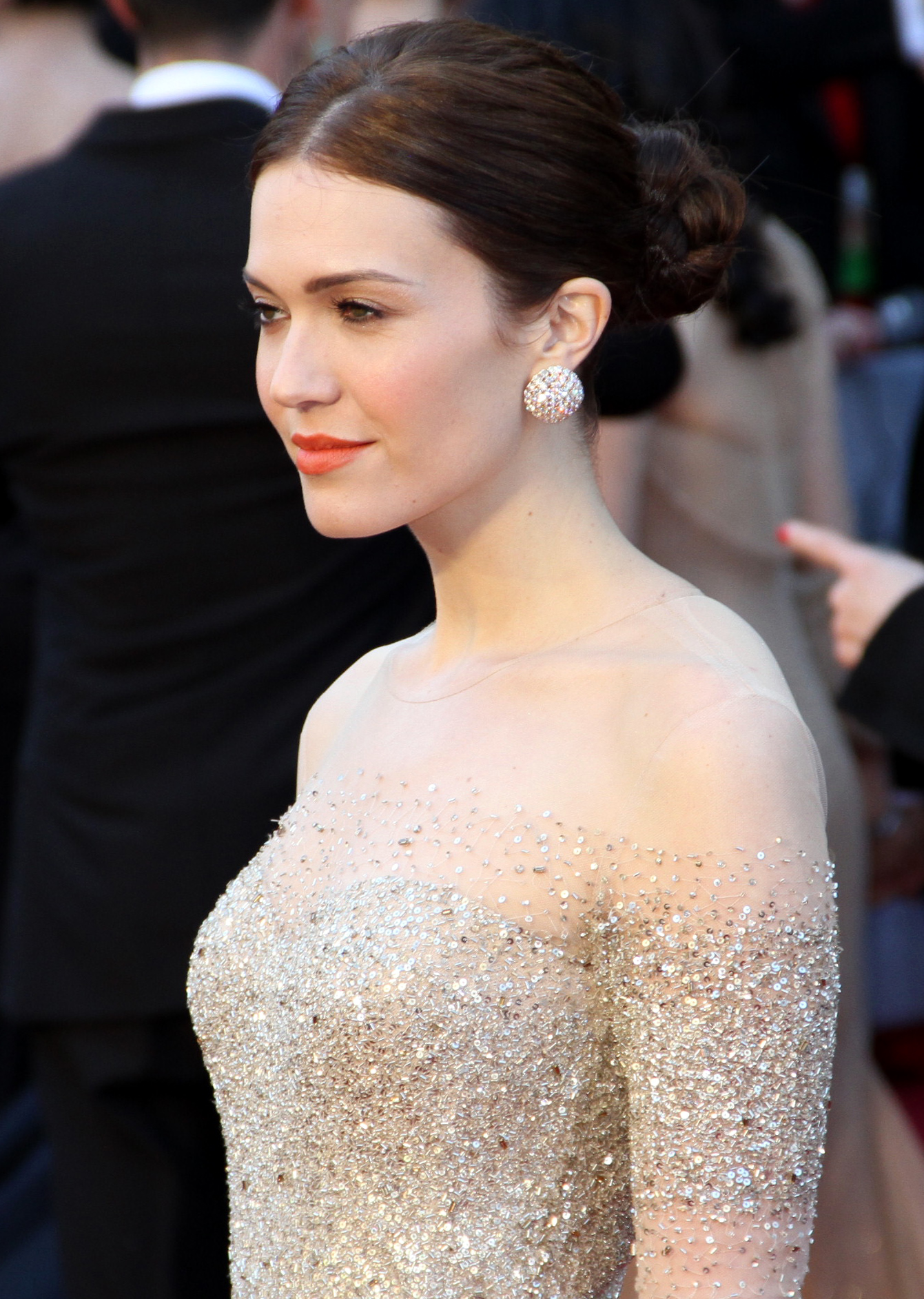
Moore at the 83rd Academy Awards in 2011

Worldwide, it is the 17th-highest-grossing animated film, the eighth-highest-grossing film of 2010, and the third-highest-grossing 2010 animated film, behind Toy Story 3 and Shrek Forever After. It is also the third Disney film appearing in the Top 10 films of 2010. It was the third-highest-grossing film worldwide produced by Walt Disney Animation Studios, behind Frozen (2013) and The Lion King (1994), as of 2011. Moore and Levi performed the film's theme song, "I See the Light", at the 83rd Academy Awards, where it was nominated for Best Original Song. The song also won a Grammy Award for Best Song Written For Visual Media as well as Best Song at the Las Vegas Film Critics Society. In October 2011, it was announced that she was set to star in an ABC sitcom called Us and Them, but the pilot was eventually passed by the network. In 2012, she co-starred with Carla Gugino and Rufus Sewell in Sebastian Gutierrez's crime drama Hotel Noir, which was released on October 9, 2012, in the U.S. From 2012 to 2013, Moore voiced Mara in the short-lived Disney XD animated science fiction series Tron: Uprising. She voiced the title character in the Disney Junior animated series Sheriff Callie's Wild West from 2014 to 2015.

In July 2012, Moore announced that she would be collaborating with her then-husband, musician Ryan Adams, on her upcoming sixth studio album. She said: "There's a lot to say and a lot that's happened to me in the last three or so years since the last record's come out, so I have been writing a lot and it's definitely going to be an intense, emotional record. I'm excited about it. I'm excited to get into the studio and start recording." On February 20, 2013, it was announced Moore would be starring as Louise in the ABC sitcom Pulling, based on the British sitcom Pulling. The pilot was written by Lee Eisenberg and Gene Stupnitsky, but in March, as the pilot came closer to production, Moore's character was moved in a different direction and Moore considered herself to no longer be the right fit for the role. Moore asked to leave the pilot and ABC agreed to it. In a July 2014 interview with CBS News, Moore said that 2014 was "the year of actual progress forward" on her sixth album and said it was more "dangerous" and "raw" than her previous albums, and said that she hoped to start recording the album in Adams's studio later in the summer. On September 5, 2014, she appeared on two tracks on Adams's self-titled fourteenth album, Ryan Adams. From 2014 to 2015, Moore had a recurring role as Dr. Erin Grace in the short-lived Fox medical comedy-drama Red Band Society.

In June 2015, it was confirmed that Moore and Levi would reprise their roles as Rapunzel and Eugene "Flynn Rider" Fitzherbert in an animated television series based on Tangled. The series, Tangled: The Series, set between Tangled and Tangled Ever After, premiered on the Disney Channel in 2017. Moore co-starred with Claire Holt in the underwater survival thriller 47 Meters Down. Filming began at Pinewood Studios in the United Kingdom and Dominican Republic on June 18, 2015, and finished on August 7, 2015. The film was released on June 16, 2017.

In September 2015, Moore said that she was continuing to work on her sixth album. "I've been working on music steadily for the last couple of years," she explained. "I guess 2016 will be the re-emergence of my music. That side of my life has been dormant for too long in my opinion."

=== 2016–present: This Is Us, awards recognition, and albums Silver Landings and In Real Life ===
In September 2016, Moore began co-starring as Rebecca Pearson in the NBC family comedy-drama This Is Us, where she later received a Golden Globe Award nomination for her role. In July 2017, Moore announced her intentions to return to music in an interview with People. She said, "I want to return to music" and that "I don't have a record label, but I have a lot of music written. Next year, I've decided I'm putting it out there!" In July 2018, she also said on Jimmy Kimmel Live! that she might collaborate with her now husband, musician Taylor Goldsmith, Dawes' lead singer and guitarist, on her new music. In August 2018, Moore co-starred with Amandla Stenberg and Patrick Gibson in the dystopian science-fiction thriller The Darkest Minds. In November, she reprised her role as Rapunzel in the Disney CGI animated comedy Ralph Breaks the Internet with John C. Reilly, Sarah Silverman, Gal Gadot, Taraji P. Henson, Kristen Bell and Jane Lynch. The film grossed almost $500 million worldwide and received generally positive reviews from critics, who called it a "worthy successor" and praised the animation, humor, characters, plot and the vocal performances of Reilly and Silverman. The film received a Best Animated Feature nomination at the 76th Golden Globe Awards and 24th Critics' Choice Awards.

In February 2019, Moore co-starred with Justin Bartha, Barbara Jacques and Paul Lieberstein in the short comedic action film The Big Break. In March, she co-starred with J.K. Simmons, Sebastian Stan, Max Greenfield and Maika Monroe in the drama I'm Not Here and voiced Courtney in the Fox animated sitcom Family Guy, in the season 17 episode "No Giggity, No Doubt". On March 25, 2019, Moore received her star on the Hollywood Walk of Fame. On September 17, 2019, Moore released her first original song in over a decade, the single "When I Wasn't Watching", with an accompanying music video; this was followed by the single "I'd Rather Lose" on October 31. In November, she co-starred in the independent historical drama Midway with Ed Skrein, Patrick Wilson, Luke Evans, Aaron Eckhart, Nick Jonas, Dennis Quaid, and Woody Harrelson.

On March 6, 2020, Moore released her sixth studio album Silver Landings via Verve Forecast Records. She said regarding her decision to sign with Verve Forecast in late 2019, "I had slight PTSD from being on labels in the past ... but Verve truly feels like it's run by a bunch of deeply creative people who aren't necessarily just concerned with the numbers game". The album was preceded by the single "Save a Little for Yourself" with an accompanying music video.

On May 13, 2022, Moore released her seventh studio album, In Real Life. The album was preceded by the release of the single "In Real Life" on March 8. It was accompanied by a cameo-laden music video which featured many of her This Is Us co-stars in addition to Wilmer Valderrama, Hilary Duff, Matthew Koma, Amanda Kloots, and Karamo Brown, among others. On April 5, Moore released her second single off the album, "Little Dreams".

== Musical style and influences ==
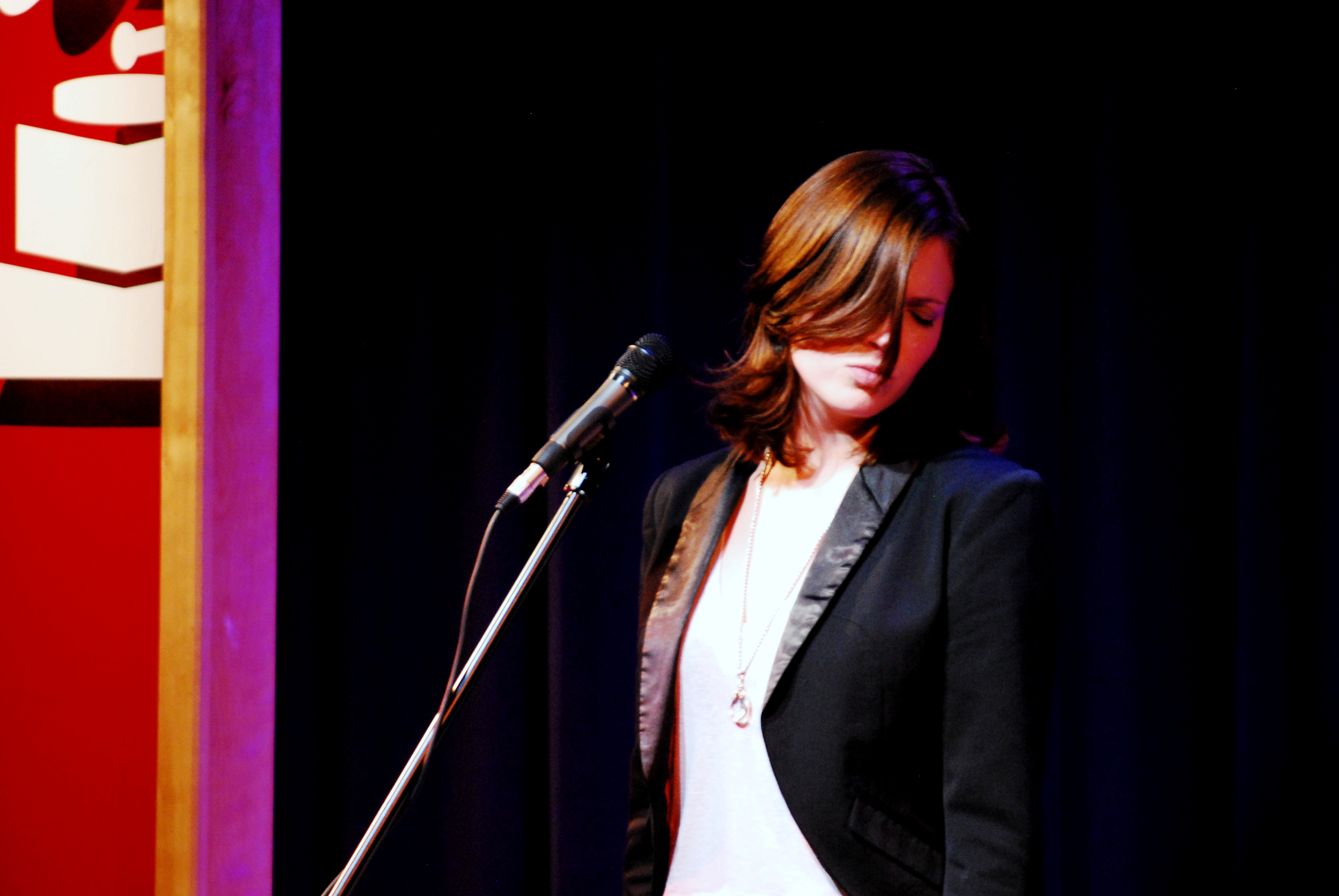
Moore performing at the Grammy Museum on June 11, 2009

When Moore's musical career began in 1999, she was known for her bubblegum pop sound and image. In 2006, Moore talked about her early albums, saying she believed her debut album So Real was appropriate for her age at their time of release, but that she "would give a refund to everyone who bought [her] first two albums" if she could. During a radio interview in April 2006, the show's co-host—who had seen Moore's comments—asked her for a refund on her debut album, which she fulfilled. Moore has since said that she has become more comfortable with her older music, and that she has found new ways to present her more bubblegum-friendly songs with contemporary musical arrangements.

Moore has often been praised by music critics for branching off and writing her own music. Billboard said, "She has successfully dropped all the tacky accoutrements of her past and turned into a sweet, classy singer-songwriter whose charms are readily apparent". AllMusic said, "Moore smoothly evolved from adolescent starlet to mature songwriter, continuing to distance herself from the scene that had launched her career one decade prior".

Moore has said that she was inspired by film and television as a child. In 2012, she stated that her then-husband, musician Ryan Adams, had a huge influence on her music and introduced her to heavy metal.

== Other endeavors ==
=== Philanthropy ===
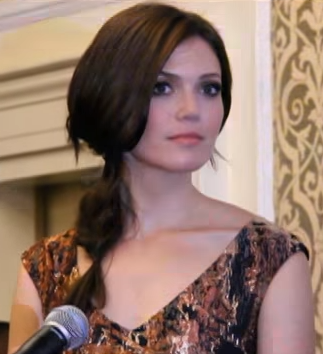
Moore at the United Nations "Roll Back Malaria" reception in September 2011

Moore advocates "giving with your head", endorsing the philosophy of effective altruism. She has worked with and publicized Population Services International, a non-profit and its subsidiary, Five & Alive, which works with health crises facing children under the age of five and their families. Moore has served as the honorary chairperson of the Leukemia & Lymphoma Society's division on awareness for youth. She was a spokesperson helping young people to be more aware of the seriousness of leukemia and lymphoma. She serves as the spokesperson for Cervical Cancer Awareness Month, held every January. In addition, increasing cervical cancer awareness, Moore collaborated with Dr. Yvonne Collins, The Gynecologic Cancer Foundation (GCF), and GlaxoSmithKline (GSK). Moore made a surprise visit to Children's Hospital Los Angeles as a part of Get Well Soon Tour.

Moore is the ambassador for the UN Foundation's Nothing But Nets malaria prevention campaign. As a part of the Nothing But Nets campaign she interviewed Laurence D. Wohlers, U.S. ambassador to the Central African Republic, in 2010 and helped the campaign raise $1.2 million. She is also the spokesperson for Dove's self-esteem movement and the "Women Who Should Be Famous" campaign. Moore teamed with Indrani Goradia, a domestic violence survivor and founder of Indrani's Light Foundation, along with Mom Bloggers Club, to increase awareness and campaign against domestic violence.

=== Politics ===
In July 2016, Moore appeared on an a cappella version of Rachel Platten's song "Fight Song" along with several other celebrities for the 2016 Democratic National Convention for Hillary Clinton's unsuccessful second bid at the presidency.

Moore was one of the demonstrators at the Los Angeles 2017 Women's March held on January 21, 2017.

On January 13, 2020, Moore officially endorsed Pete Buttigieg for President of the United States prior to the Iowa caucuses. Moore also uses her social media platforms to support criminal justice reform and Black Lives Matter.

=== Fashion ===
Moore's fashion career began in 2005 with her own fashion line called Mblem. It was a brand of contemporary knitwear and cashmere. One of her focuses was to sell clothing for taller women; Moore is 5 feet 10 inches (1.78 m). In February 2009, she announced that the line would be discontinued, but she hoped to return to her fashion career under different circumstances in the future.

== Personal life ==
Moore dated actor Zach Braff from 2004 to 2006.

In 2008, Moore began dating musician Ryan Adams. They were engaged in February 2009 and married on March 10, 2009, in Savannah, Georgia. In January 2015, Moore filed for divorce from Adams while he was in New York, citing "irreconcilable differences." Moore and Adams released a joint statement explaining their decision, calling it a "respectful, amicable parting of ways." In 2019 she called Adams emotionally abusive. Court documents obtained later revealed that they had been legally separated for nearly six months before the filing. The divorce was finalized in June 2016.

In 2015, Moore began dating musician Taylor Goldsmith. They were engaged in September 2017 and married on November 18, 2018, in Los Angeles, California. They have two sons born in 2021 and 2022. Their daughter was born in 2024.

In 2019, accompanied by friends and fellow hikers, Moore reached the Everest base camp, which has an elevation of 17,598 ft. In 2019, Moore also revealed that she suffers from digestive issues and gluten sensitivity, which causes fatigue, gas, and bloating. In August 2022, Moore was diagnosed with immune thrombocytopenic purpura, an incurable but treatable autoimmune disease that causes abnormally low levels of platelets.

In January 2025, her home in Altadena, California, was believed to have been burned down due to the Eaton Fire. She later learned that her house was still standing, but almost all of the contents inside were lost due to damage from having been surrounded by fire from all sides. Her relatives' house burned down in the fire. She was then criticized online after sharing on Instagram that a GoFundMe page had been set up for them. She responded by telling negative internet commentators that she was obviously helping out her relatives, and to "Kindly F OFF."

== Discography ==
Studio albums

- So Real (1999)
- Mandy Moore (2001)
- Coverage (2003)
- Wild Hope (2007)
- Amanda Leigh (2009)
- Silver Landings (2020)
- In Real Life (2022)

== Tours ==
=== Headlining ===
- In Real Life Tour (2022)

=== Co-headlining ===
- Paula Cole and Mandy Moore in Concert (2007)

=== Opening act ===
- NSYNC in Concert (1999)
- Into the Millennium Tour (2000)
- My December Tour (2008)
- Identified Summer Tour (2008)

== Filmography ==
=== Film ===
Year	Title	Role	Notes
2001	Dr. Dolittle 2	Girl Bear Cub	Voice
2001	The Princess Diaries	Lana Thomas	
2002	A Walk to Remember	Jamie Elizabeth Sullivan-Carter	
2002	All I Want	Lisa	
2003	How to Deal	Halley Martin	
2004	Chasing Liberty	Anna Foster	
2004	Saved!	Hilary Faye Stockard	
2005	Racing Stripes	Sandy	Voice
2005	Romance & Cigarettes	Baby Murder	
2006	American Dreamz	Sally Kendoo	
2006	Brother Bear 2	Nita	Voice
2007	Because I Said So	Milly Wilder	
2007	License to Wed	Sadie Jones	
2007	Dedication	Lucy Reilly	
2007	Southland Tales	Madeline Frost Santaros	
2009	Swinging with the Finkels	Ellie Finkel	
2010	Tangled	Rapunzel	Voice
2011	Love, Wedding, Marriage	Ava Gold	
2012	Tangled Ever After	Rapunzel	Voice, short film
2012	Hotel Noir	Evangeline Lundy	
2017	47 Meters Down	Lisa	
2017	I'm Not Here	Mom	
2018	The Darkest Minds	Catherine "Cate" Connor	
2018	Ralph Breaks the Internet	Rapunzel	Voice
2019	The Big Break	Natasha	Short film
2019	Midway	Anne Best	
2023	Once Upon a Studio	Rapunzel	Voice, short film
2026	The Breadwinner	Katie	

=== Television ===
Year	Title	Role	Notes
2000	2GE+HER: The Series	Herself	Episode: "Bunny"
2000	All That	Herself	Episode: "Mandy Moore"
2001	The Andy Dick Show	Herself	Episode: "Andy Land"
2002	All That	Herself	Episode: "David Arquette/Mandy Moore"
2003, 2023	Clone High	Hot Homeless Girl Who May or May Not Be Mandy Moore	Voice, 2 episodes
2003	Punk'd	Herself	Episode: "#1.2"
2003	I Love the '80s Strikes Back	Herself	Documentary miniseries
2004	The Andy Dick Show	Herself	Episode: "Andy Land"
2005	Criss Angel Mindfreak	Herself	Episode: "Blind"
2005	Entourage	Herself / Aquagirl	5 episodes
2006	Scrubs	Julie Quinn	2 episodes
2006	The Simpsons	Tabitha Vixx	Voice, episode: "Marge and Homer Turn a Couple Play"
2007	How I Met Your Mother	Amy	Episode: "Wait for It"
2010	Grey's Anatomy	Mary Portman	4 episodes
2012–2013	Tron: Uprising	Mara	Voice, main role
2013–2015	High School USA!	Cassandra Barren	Voice, main role
2013	Christmas in Conway	Natalie Springer	Television film
2014	Sofia the First	Rapunzel	Voice, episode: "The Curse of Princess Ivy"
2014–2015	Red Band Society	Dr. Erin Grace	5 episodes
2014–2017	Sheriff Callie's Wild West	Sheriff Callie	Voice, main role
2016–2022	This Is Us	Rebecca Pearson	Main role
2017	Tangled: Before Ever After	Rapunzel	Voice, television film
2017–2020	Rapunzel's Tangled Adventure	Rapunzel	Voice, main role
2018	Drunk History	Clara Barton	Episode: "Heroines"
2019	Family Guy	Courtney	Voice, episode: "No Giggity, No Doubt"
2023	Lego Disney Princess: The Castle Quest	Rapunzel	Voice, television special
2023	Dr. Death	Benita Alexander	Main role, season 2
2024	Dinner Time Live with David Chang	Herself	Episode: "The Summer Menu"
2025	#1 Happy Family USA	Mrs. Malcolm	Voice, recurring role

=== Music video ===
Year	Song	Artist	Role	Notes
2000	"Little Things"	Good Charlotte	Ex-Girlfriend	
2008	"Make You Crazy"	Brett Dennen ft. Femi Kuti	Shoe store customer	

=== Video games ===
Year	Title	Role	Notes
2002	Kingdom Hearts	Aerith Gainsborough	English version
2010	Tangled: The Video Game	Rapunzel	
2012	Disney Princess: My Fairytale Adventure	Rapunzel	
2013	Kingdom Hearts HD 1.5 Remix	Aerith Gainsborough	English version; Archived audio
2013	Disney Infinity	Rapunzel	
2014	Disney Infinity 2.0	Rapunzel	
2015	Disney Infinity 3.0	Rapunzel	
2023	Disney Dreamlight Valley	Rapunzel	
2024	Disney Speedstorm	Rapunzel	

== Awards and honors ==
In 2012, Moore was ranked number 96 on VH1's list of "100 Greatest Women in Music" as well as number 63 on their "Sexiest Artists of All Time List".

She was nominated for a Golden Globe Award for Best Supporting Actress – Series, Miniseries or Television Film and a Primetime Emmy Award for Outstanding Lead Actress in a Drama Series. As a part of the ensemble cast of This Is Us, she received two Screen Actors Guild Awards for Outstanding Performance by an Ensemble in a Drama Series.

On March 25, 2019, she received a star on the Hollywood Walk of Fame.

In June 2024, Moore received the inaugural Lifetime of Culture Award at the Las Culturistas Culture Awards.
