= So Real (Mandy Moore song) =

2000 single by Mandy Moore

Single by Mandy Moore

from the album I Wanna Be with You
- B-side: "Candy" (remix); "Not Too Young"
- Released: 2000
- Length: 3:50
- Label: Epic
- Songwriters: Tony Battaglia; Shaun Fisher
- Producer: The Wasabees

Mandy Moore singles chronology
| "I Wanna Be with You" (2000) | "So Real" (2000) | "In My Pocket" (2001) |

Music video
- "So Real" on YouTube

"So Real" is a song by American singer Mandy Moore. The song was first included on her 1999 debut album, So Real, as its opening track and was later released as a single from the album's 2000 reissue, I Wanna Be with You. The song was written and produced by Tony Battaglia and Shaun Fisher.

Upon its release, "So Real" reached number 21 on the Australian Singles Chart and number 18 on the New Zealand Singles Chart. The song was also recorded in French as "C'est si facile".

== Music video ==
The music video for "So Real" was directed by Gregory Dark. Mandy begins singing and dancing in a meadow. Next, she appears in a secret forest. She writes in her diary and sings and dances while wearing a fairy costume. Mandy is sitting in the meadow again as the song ends. The video features a brief appearance by actress Jenna Dewan.

== Track listing ==
Australian CD single

1. "So Real"
2. "Candy" (Wade Robson remix)
3. "Not Too Young"
4. "So Real" (Wade Robson remix)
5. "So Real" (video clip)

== Charts ==
| Chart (2000) | Peak position |
|---|---|
| Australia (ARIA) | 21 |
| New Zealand (Recorded Music NZ) | 18 |
