= Candy (Mandy Moore song) =

1999 single by Mandy Moore

Single by Mandy Moore

from the album So Real and I Wanna Be with You
- B-side: Snippets; "Not Too Young"
- Released: August 17, 1999
- Genre: Bubblegum pop
- Length: 3:54
- Label: Epic; 550 Music
- Songwriters: Denise Rich; Dave Katz; Jive Jones
- Producers: Jive Jones; Tony Battaglia; Shaun Fisher

Mandy Moore singles chronology
"Candy" (1999)	"Walk Me Home" (1999)

Music video
- "Candy" on YouTube

"Candy" is a song by American pop singer Mandy Moore. Serving as Moore's debut single, it was released as the lead single from her first studio album, So Real (1999), on August 17, 1999, by Epic Records and 550 Music. Internationally, the song was released as the lead single from I Wanna Be with You (2000). The song was written and composed by Denise Rich, Dave Katz, and Jive Jones, and produced by Jones, Tony Battaglia, and Shaun Fisher.

The song was moderately successful on the US charts, peaking at number 41 on the Billboard Hot 100 in October 1999, and was certified gold by the Recording Industry Association of America (RIAA) for having sold more than 500,000 copies in the US. The success of the single led to an earlier release date for So Real.

== Background ==
Mandy Moore, who as a child participated in local singing troupes and had sung the National Anthem at various events in Orlando, was said to be discovered by producers Shaun Fisher and Tony Battaglia when they listened to a track she sang on a children's music CD. Moore worked with Fisher and Battaglia on recording a demo, which eventually found its way to record labels and sparked a bidding war for Moore between Sony Records and MCA Records. After signing with Epic Records, Moore began work on her debut album with Battaglia and Fisher as primary producers and writers. "Candy" and So Real were released when Moore was fifteen years old. In the summer of 1999, Moore toured with boy band NSYNC on their NSYNC in Concert tour to promote the single.

== Composition ==
"Candy" is a bubblegum pop song that lasts for 3 minutes and 54 seconds, written in the key of G major. The song begins with a "twinkling melody that [adds to the song's] dreamy innocence". Can't Stop the Pop wrote the song "encapsulated the bubblegum era like no other", and although it shares elements with Swedish pop, its "lyrical content and delivery were skewed towards a younger teen audience." The website added,

Of course, the pièce de résistance of the whole song is the iconic spoken middle-eight. It's the moment that Mandy Moore stamps her identity over the track...'You know who you are, your love is as sweet as candy, I'll be forever yours, love always, Mandy'. This is what the bubblegum pop era was all about; music that was completely unfazed and unpretentious about itself, no matter how utterly absurd it could be.

== Critical reception ==
Though the song was a commercial success, "Candy" received mixed reviews from critics who compared the single to that of other teen pop singers like Britney Spears, Christina Aguilera, and Jessica Simpson. In a lukewarm review, William Ruhlmann of AllMusic wrote,

Moore is 550 Music's entry in the female teen singer sweepstakes of 1999. Moore lacks the undercurrent of sensuality Britney Spears brings to such material, but then she seems to be aiming at a younger demographic. Whether or not she makes it is more dependent on her looks, her ability to dance, and her label's promotional abilities than on the record itself, which is about par for this sort of thing.

== Chart performance ==
"Candy" charted on the Billboard Hot 100, entering at number 88 and peaking outside the top 40 at number 41 on the week of October 29, 1999. The single received more success abroad, peaking at number six in the UK and number two in Australia. As of November 2012, "Candy" has sold 753,000 physical copies and 198,000 paid digital downloads according to Nielsen Soundscan.

== Music video ==
Moore dancing in a skatepark in the song's music video.

The music video to promote the single and album was directed by Chris Robinson. Filmed in July 1999, the video begins with shots of a typical neighborhood, with the camera eventually zooming in to Mandy Moore's bedroom. After Moore's friends (played by the members of the female pop group P.Y.T.) call Moore from outside her bedroom window, her friends get in a green Volkswagen New Beetle (with the VW logos removed) and Moore drives her friends to their destination. A boy skateboarding with friends in the neighborhood notices Moore as her car passes him by. Moore and her friends arrive at a diner called Cadillac Jack's. After being seated, the same boy from earlier shows up in the diner with his friends. He and Moore steal glances at each other from across the diner. The video intercuts between Moore dancing outside the diner with her friends and her crush driving his Vespa-style scooter through the neighborhood, accompanied by Moore. The end of the music video shows Moore and her dancers in an empty pool, surrounded by the skateboarders doing laps.

== Live performances ==
Moore performed the Wade Robson Remix version during Summer Music Mania 2000.

== Legacy ==
Though Moore has expressed distaste for the teen pop beginnings of her early music career, she has since embraced "Candy" and performs the song as part of her set list at her shows. "Candy" was covered by Tiffany Giardina for her 2009 album No Average Angel. The song was featured in the 2000 movie Center Stage, as well as in "First Day", the first episode of 2019 comedy series Pen15. The 2021 music video for "Brutal" by Olivia Rodrigo contained visual references to Y2K-era pop culture like the "Candy" video, including the lime green VW bug and a nod to Moore's hairstyle. "Candy" was featured in one of the scenes in the Netflix movie Senior Year (2022), starring Australian actress Rebel Wilson.

== Track listings ==
The US snippets consist of album tracks "So Real", "What You Want", "Lock Me in Your Heart", and "Quit Breaking My Heart". The Australian version also includes a snippet of "Candy" between the first two tracks.

US CD and cassette single

1. "Candy" (album version) – 3:54
2. "Candy" (instrumental) – 3:53
3. Snippets – 5:50

UK CD1

1. "Candy" – 3:56
2. "Candy" (Hex Hector radio edit) – 3:45
3. "Not Too Young" – 3:52
4. "Candy" (video version) – 2:58

UK CD2

1. "Candy" – 3:56
2. "Candy" (Rhythm Masters club mix) – 7:35
3. "Candy" (Richie Santana club mix) – 6:34

UK cassette single

1. "Candy" – 3:56
2. "Not Too Young" – 3:52

European CD single

1. "Candy" (album version) – 3:56
2. "Candy" (Hex Hector radio edit) – 3:45

European maxi-CD single

1. "Candy" (album version) – 3:56
2. "Candy" (Hex Hector 12-inch mix) – 9:52
3. "Candy" (Richie Santana club mix) – 6:34

Australian CD single

1. "Candy" – 4:06
2. "Candy" (George Calle radio remix) – 3:42
3. "Candy" (Hex Hector radio mix) – 3:45
4. "Candy" (Santana radio) – 4:20
5. Album snippets – 18:57
6. Multimedia

== Credits and personnel ==
Credits for "Candy" are adapted from the So Real liner notes.

- Mandy Moore – vocals
- Billy Lawrence – backing vocals
- Jive Jones – backing vocals, production
- Dakari – additional vocals
- Rob Bailey – guitars
- Tony Battaglia – guitars, mixing
- Dave Katz – keyboards and drum programming
- Shaun Fisher – keyboards and drum programming, bass
- The Wasabees – co-production
- Charlie Pennachio – co-production
- Ethan Mates – recording
- Mike Tucker – recording
- Tommie Hicks Jr. – recording
- Joe Smith – mixing

== Charts ==
=== Weekly charts ===
Chart (1999–2000)	Peak position
Australia (ARIA)	2
Belgium (Ultratip Bubbling Under Flanders)	9
Belgium (Ultratop 50 Wallonia)	30
Canada Top Singles (RPM)	35
Canada Adult Contemporary (RPM)	49
Europe (European Hot 100 Singles)	24
France (SNEP)	16
Germany (GfK)	72
Iceland (Íslenski Listinn Topp 40)	29
Ireland (IRMA)	27
New Zealand (Recorded Music NZ)	10
Scottish Singles Sales (Official Charts)	5
Sweden (Sverigetopplistan)	46
Switzerland (Schweizer Hitparade)	39
UK Singles (Official Charts)	6
US Billboard Hot 100	41
US Pop Airplay (Billboard)	27

=== Year-end charts ===
Chart (2000)	Rank
Australia (ARIA)	11
UK Singles (OCC)	172

== Certifications and sales ==
Region	Certification	Certified units/sales
Australia (ARIA)	Platinum	70,000^{^}
France	—	57,826
United States (RIAA)	Gold	951,000
^{^} Shipments figures based on certification alone.

== Release history ==
Region	Date	Format(s)	Label(s)	Ref(s).
United States	August 17, 1999	Contemporary hit radio; CD; cassette	Epic; 550 Music	
United Kingdom	April 24, 2000	CD; cassette	Epic; 550 Music	
