= Center Stage (2000 film) =

2000 film by Nicholas Hytner

- Theatrical release poster
- Directed by: Nicholas Hytner
- Written by: Carol Heikkinen
- Produced by: Laurence Mark
- Starring: Amanda Schull; Zoe Saldaña; Susan May Pratt; Peter Gallagher; Donna Murphy; Ethan Stiefel
- Cinematography: Geoffrey Simpson
- Edited by: Tariq Anwar
- Music by: George Fenton
- Production companies: Columbia Pictures; Laurence Mark Productions
- Distributed by: Sony Pictures Releasing
- Release date: May 12, 2000
- Running time: 115 minutes
- Country: United States
- Language: English
- Budget: $18-29 million
- Box office: $26.3 million

Center Stage is a 2000 American teen drama film directed by Nicholas Hytner about a group of young ballet dancers from various backgrounds who enroll at the fictitious American Ballet Academy in New York City. The film explores the issues and difficulties in the world of professional dance, and how each individual copes with the stresses. It also served as the film debut for actresses Zoe Saldaña and Amanda Schull. The film was released theatrically in the United States on May 12, 2000.

The single from the film's soundtrack "I Wanna Be with You" is performed by Mandy Moore. The song became Moore's highest-charting song in the US at number 24, becoming her only top 40 song in the nation. It spent 16 weeks on the Billboard Hot 100, and peaked during its 9th week on the chart.

== Plot ==
After a series of countrywide auditions, 12 young dancers gain entry to the American Ballet Academy (which is loosely based on the School of American Ballet), the affiliate school of the fictional American Ballet Company. Jody Sawyer is selected for the ABA, despite her “bad feet” and poor turnout, because of her clear passion for and dedication to ballet. She soon meets unfriendly star student Maureen Cummings, whose demanding mother works at the school, and the frank but talented Eva Rodriguez. Jody also befriends three male ballet dancers: handsome new student Charlie Sims, gay Oprah fan Erik "O" Jones and Sergei, a Russian who desperately misses his girlfriend, Galina, in San Francisco.

On the first day of class, the students meet Jonathan Reeves, the company's choreographer and director, who tells the students that at the end of the year, a final dance workshop will determine the three boys and three girls who will be asked to join the company. The workshop will also allow the students to showcase their talent to other ballet companies nationwide. Therefore, a lead part in the workshop is essential to secure a dancer's future.

In class, Jody is singled out by instructor Juliette Simone for her bad turnout, while Eva is recognized for her skill as a dancer but nonetheless makes a bad impression with her lack of respect for Jonathan and the faculty. Jody learns that famed ABC dancer Kathleen Donahue is newly married to Jonathan. She had previously been in a long-term relationship with Cooper Nielsen, another star ABC dancer who fled to London in the wake of the scandal and has only just returned to the company.

Jody and Eva develop a somewhat tense relationship with Maureen, their roommate, due to her lack of warmth toward Jody as she struggles to prove herself in class and her own arrogant attitude. Maureen is clearly favored by the school's faculty and seems to be a lock for one of the coveted positions in the company. She is also bulimic and pushed hard to succeed by her mother Nancy, who had failed at her own dreams of becoming a ballerina. Maureen meets and falls in love with pre-med student Jim, who shows Maureen what a life without ballet could look like. Jim discovers Maureen's bulimia and expresses deep concern. Outraged, Maureen ends the relationship.

After weeks of training relentlessly and receiving guidance from the academy teachers, Jody is told by Jonathan and Juliette that she is not improving and that he cannot cast her in the workshop, meaning she'll have no future in ballet if she stays. Since she has bad feet and also doesn't have the "ideal body type" he encourages her to leave the school. She refuses to give up on her dream and goes to a modern dance class to unwind, where she encounters Cooper. He encourages her to follow her passion for dance and ignore Jonathan's criticisms. They sleep together.

Days later, Cooper casts Jody, Charlie and Erik in an original ballet for the workshop. Jody remains infatuated with Cooper despite his clear indifference to her, and he eventually coldly rejects her, leading to tension in rehearsals. Charlie, who has a crush on Jody, presses her to pour her feelings into dancing, leading to a passionate performance that satisfies Cooper. Maureen and Sergei are cast as the leads in Jonathan's ballet for the workshop, while Eva receives a background role and sadly accepts that she'll be unable to make an impression or get a job as a result.

During the final rehearsals of Cooper's ballet, which is based on his failed relationship with Kathleen and her affair with Jonathan, Erik is badly injured. Cooper decides to dance the role himself, further inflaming the tensions between him, Jody, and Charlie. Shaken by Erik's injury, Maureen goes to Jim and admits she no longer wants to dance. Eva continues to practice ballet after hours. Juliette, witnessing her dedication, offers her help and Eva accepts.

On the night of the workshop, the audience and Sergei are both stunned to see Eva in Maureen's role. Nancy rushes out of the theater and confronts Maureen, who tells her she cannot continue dedicating her own life to her mother's dream but wants to enroll in a regular college in order to seek help for her eating disorder. Cooper's ballet is well received. After the performance, Cooper tells Jody that he has found a financial backer to start his own company and invites her to be his principal dancer. She goes to her interview with Jonathan and Juliette and declines to hear whether they're offering her a position, instead choosing to join Cooper's new company. Eva, to her shock, is offered a place and joyously accepts. Charlie and Erik, despite his injury, receive places at ABA as well. Sergei receives an offer in San Francisco, with his girlfriend.

Jody tells Cooper she's joining him and he attempts to rekindle their romance, but Jody rebuffs him in favor of Charlie. Maureen and Eva hug at the workshop reception, friends at last, and Maureen, who has reconciled with Jim, says she isn't yet all right but will be soon.

In the closing credits, the dancers are seen rehearsing at their respective dance companies while Maureen begins university classes with Jim and finally makes friends.

== Cast ==
- Amanda Schull as Jody Sawyer
- Zoe Saldana as Eva Rodríguez
- Susan May Pratt as Maureen Cummings
- Peter Gallagher as Jonathan Reeves
- Debra Monk as Nancy Cummings
- Ethan Stiefel as Cooper Nielson
- Sascha Radetsky as Charles "Charlie" Sims
- Donna Murphy as Juliette Simone
- Julie Kent as Kathleen Donahue
- Ilia Kulik as Sergei
- Eion Bailey as James "Jim" Gordon
- Shakiem Evans as Erik "O. Jones" Jones
- Elizabeth Hubbard as Joan Miller

Broadway performer Priscilla Lopez has a cameo appearance as the jazz instructor at Jody and Cooper's modern dance class.

== Production ==
Of the main characters who are dancers, four are professional ballet dancers (Amanda Schull, Ethan Stiefel, Sascha Radetsky, and Julie Kent), one is a professional figure skater (Ilia Kulik), one had ballet training (Zoe Saldana), and two were actors with no ballet training (Susan May Pratt and Shakiem Evans). Body doubles were used for many of the major dance sequences. Dancers from New York City Ballet and American Ballet Theatre filled the classrooms of ABA and corps in the workshop ballets, some of them later became principal dancers, including Gillian Murphy, Stella Abrera, Jonathan Stafford, Jared Angle, Janie Taylor and Rebecca Krohn.

The film was choreographed by Susan Stroman who won an American Choreography Award for it.

The subplot in which Cooper attracts the financial support of a flirtatious wealthy female philanthropist is mentioned in an August 15, 2004, The New York Times article entitled "How Much Is That Dancer in the Program?", which revealed that Stiefel has a very similar real-life sponsorship relationship with a philanthropist named Anka Palitz.

== Reception ==
=== Box office ===
The film opened at #6 at the box office making US$4,604,621 in its opening weekend. The film has grossed a total of $26,385,941 worldwide.

=== Critical response ===
Center Stage received mixed reviews. The film holds a 42% approval rating on Rotten Tomatoes, based on 79 reviews with an average rating of 5.03/10. The site's consensus states: "Viewers willing to sit through soapy plot contrivances to see some excellent dancing might enjoy Center Stage; for everyone else, there's still always Fame." Metacritic, which uses a weighted average, assigned the film a score of 52 out of 100, based on 33 critics, indicating "mixed or average" reviews.

The New York Times critic A. O. Scott wrote for the film:

The script, by Carol Heikkinen, has a lot of business to take care of before the Big Show, which is its mandatory climax, and it steamrolls through its expository scenes with more efficiency than grace, as though in a desperate hurry to reach the next commercial break. Cooper's climactic dance, Ms. Stroman's work, at first looks like a horrifying compilation of Dirty Dancing pelvic action and the kind of knee sliding and arm-waving that was mercifully quashed at this year's Oscars.

Contactmusic.com gave the film just two stars, commenting that:

Along the way misguided affairs (Jodie falls for the cocky, beloved star of the Company), eating disorders and injuries crop up, pushing the plot along. As do unfortunate lines like, 'I'm not dancing for them anymore; I'm dancing for me.' The only solace from such schlock is the fact that the film makes it clear from the start that it exists simply to showcase the dancing itself. As such, it's no shock when the choreography upstages the screenwriting. Ultimately the story line here is as stupid as the final "rock" ballet. The characters are one-dimensional, as are their "struggles." In fact, the territory is so familiar that it's almost excusable. With that said it's still hard to watch Center Stage and be able to get the familiar opening music to Fame out of your head; it's also hard to remember why you're not simply watching that film instead.

Other reviewers were more charitable. Roger Ebert of the Chicago Sun-Times gave the film three stars out of four and wrote that the film "ends with two big ballet numbers, wonderfully staged and danced, and along the way there are rehearsals and scenes in a Broadway popular dance studio that have a joy and freedom." Meanwhile, Monica Eng of the Chicago Tribune also gave the film three stars out of four and wrote that "In casting for dance talent rather than acting, director Nicolas Hytner may have given up a little dramatic grace, but what he gains in dance footage (that ranges from ballet to jazz to salsa) more than makes up for that." Eng also wrote that "although the film's ending is a little too neat and happy to be realistic, it does leave you with the feeling of young girls taking charge of their lives. In Hollywood films, that's as exotic a dance as you are going to see."

== Soundtrack ==
The single from the film "I Wanna Be with You" is performed by Mandy Moore. The song became Moore's highest-charting song in the US at number 24, becoming her only top 40 song in the nation. It spent 16 weeks on the Billboard Hot 100.

1. "I Wanna Be with You" – Mandy Moore
2. "First Kiss" – i5
3. "Don't Get Lost in the Crowd" – Ashley Ballard
4. "We're Dancing" – P.Y.T.
5. "Friends Forever" – Thunderbugs
6. "Get Used to This" – Cyrena
7. "A Girl Can Dream" – P.Y.T.
8. "Cosmic Girl" – Jamiroquai
9. "Higher Ground" – Red Hot Chili Peppers
10. "Come Baby Come" – Elvis Crespo & Gizelle D'Cole
11. "The Way You Make Me Feel" – Michael Jackson
12. "If I Was the One" – Ruff Endz
13. "Canned Heat" – Jamiroquai
14. "I Wanna Be with You" (Soul Solution Remix) – Mandy Moore

== Sequels ==
A sequel to the film titled Center Stage: Turn It Up starring Rachele Brooke Smith was first released in cinemas in Australia on October 30, 2008, and debuted in the United States on November 1, 2008, on the Oxygen channel.

Another sequel Center Stage: On Pointe premiered on Lifetime on June 25, 2016. The film stars Nicole Muñoz and former Dance Moms star Chloe Lukasiak and features alumni from the first two films mentoring a younger generation of dancers.

== Television series ==
On May 12, 2020, which was the film's 20th anniversary, it was announced that a follow-up TV series is in development. Jennifer Kaytin Robinson will write, direct and executive produce the series. Laurence Mark, the producer of the original film, will also serve as an executive producer. The series will follow a new group of students at the American Ballet Academy, now run by Cooper Nielson.
