= So Real (album) =

Studio album by Mandy Moore
- Released: December 7, 1999
- Recorded: 1999
- Genre: Teen pop
- Length: 44:32
- Label: Epic; 550
- Producer: The Wasabees; Tony Moran; Rogers & Sturken; Jive Jones

Mandy Moore chronology
So Real (1999)	I Wanna Be with You (2000)

Singles from So Real
- 1. "Candy" Released: August 17, 1999; 2. "Walk Me Home" Released: December 4, 1999

So Real is the debut studio album by American singer Mandy Moore. The album was released on December 7, 1999, in the United States by Epic Records. It was part of the teen-pop revival which saw other teen artists such as Britney Spears, Christina Aguilera and Jessica Simpson release their debut albums that same year to commercial and critical success. Conceptually, the album addresses themes such as teenage love, romance and heartbreak, all of which were common subjects in teen pop music at the time.

So Real became a moderate hit in the United States, reaching a peak of 31 on the Billboard 200 albums chart, as well as being certified Platinum by the RIAA, for shipments & sales of over 1 million. The album spawned a top 50 hit with "Candy" and went gold within three months in the RIAA.

Five months following the release of So Real, it was reissued as I Wanna Be with You, which also served as Moore's debut album internationally.

== Singles ==
"Candy" was released as Moore' debut single on August 17, 1999. The song received generally favorable critical reviews from critics, mostly praising its composition. It performed moderately well on the Billboard Hot 100, peaking just outside the top 40 at #41. It entered the chart on #88 and reached its peak in its eighth week on the chart. It received more success abroad, peaking at #6 in the UK and #2 in Australia. The music video, which was directed by Chris Robinson, had a cameo by the girl group PYT.

"Walk Me Home" was released on December 4, 1999, as the second single in the US; the song failed to chart when it was first released. On October 14, 2000, the song was re-released to promote I Wanna Be with You and peaked at #38 on the Billboard Pop 100 chart.

== Reception ==
Professional ratings
Review scores
Source	Rating
AllMusic	3/5 stars
Entertainment Weekly	C−

Reviews among music critics were generally mixed. William Ruhlmann of AllMusic said, "Fifteen-year-old Mandy Moore's debut album sounded like it was inspired almost entirely by listening to recent hit albums by 'N Sync, the Backstreet Boys, and Britney Spears", citing stylistic similarities between album tracks "So Real" and "Let Me Be the One" to the Backstreet Boys' "Backstreet's Back", and saying that Moore's "occasional growls" were similar to Spears' "...Baby One More Time". Ruhlmann stated that Moore could "carry a tune", but "with no particular distinction", saying that aside from her singing, the music was "mediocre". Stephanie Mcgrath from the Canadian publication Jam! compared the album to the work of Spears and Jessica Simpson; she also labeled the material as "a mediocre collection that could fade quickly unless "Candy" continues to catch on with young pop fanatics". Overall, she stated, "If female pop is what you crave, opt for Jessica Simpson or Britney Spears".

== Commercial performance ==
In the United States, So Real had moderate success. The album debuted at number 71 on the US Billboard 200 and later peaked at number 31. The album spent a total of 23 weeks on the US Billboard 200 chart. It ranked at 116 on the 1999 Billboard 200 year-end chart. So Real was certified RIAA Platinum in the US after four months with 1 million copies sold.

== Track listing ==
No.	Title	Writer(s)	Producer(s)	Length
1.	"So Real"	Tony Battaglia, Shaun Fisher	The Wasabees	3:51
2.	"Candy"	Battaglia, Dave Katz, Jive Jones, Denise Rich	Jones, The Wasabees	3:56
3.	"What You Want"	Battaglia, Fisher, Skip Masland	The Wasabees	3:42
4.	"Walk Me Home"	Battaglia, Fisher	The Wasabees	4:23
5.	"Lock Me in Your Heart"	Battaglia, Fisher	The Wasabees	3:31
6.	"Telephone (Interlude)"			0:15
7.	"Quit Breaking My Heart"	Battaglia, Fisher	The Wasabees	3:53
8.	"Let Me Be the One" (Five Star cover)	Ian Foster	The Wasabees	3:50
9.	"Not Too Young"	Battaglia, Obie Morant	The Wasabees	3:52
10.	"Love Shot"	Carl Sturken, Evan Rogers	Sturken, Rogers	4:24
11.	"I Like It"	Howie Dorough, Mike Lorello, Tony Moran, Rich	Moran	4:26
12.	"Love You for Always"	Battaglia, Fisher	The Wasabees	3:22
13.	"Quit Breaking My Heart (Reprise)"	Battaglia, Fisher	The Wasabees	1:01
Total length:				44:32

== Personnel ==
Credits for So Real adapted from Allmusic.

- Mandy Moore – primary artist
- Tony Battaglia – composer
- Dakari – guest artist
- Shaun Fisher – composer
- Jive – guest artist
- Billy Lawrence – guest artist
- T. Moran – composer
- David Rice – composer
- Mark Stevens – composer

== Charts ==
=== Weekly charts ===
Weekly chart performance for So Real
Chart (1999–2000)	Peak position
US Billboard 200	31

=== Year-end charts ===
Year-end chart performance for So Real
Chart (2000)	Position
US Billboard 200	116

== Certifications ==
Region	Certification	Certified units/sales
United States (RIAA)	Platinum	950,000
