= Murder on the Dancefloor =

2001 single by Sophie Ellis-Bextor

Single by Sophie Ellis-Bextor

from the album Read My Lips
- B-side: "Never Let Me Down"
- Released: 3 December 2001
- Studio: Mayfair (London, England)
- Genre: Disco-pop
- Length: 3:52 (album version); 3:37 (radio edit)
- Label: Polydor
- Songwriters: Sophie Ellis-Bextor; Gregg Alexander
- Producers: Gregg Alexander; Matt Rowe

Sophie Ellis-Bextor singles chronology
"Take Me Home" (2001)	"Murder on the Dancefloor" (2001)	"Get Over You" / "Move This Mountain" (2002)
"Immortal" (2023)	"Murder on the Dancefloor" (re-release) (2024)	"Ready for Your Love" (2024)

Music video
- "Murder on the Dancefloor" on YouTube

"Murder on the Dancefloor" is a song written by Sophie Ellis-Bextor and Gregg Alexander, produced by Alexander and Matt Rowe for Ellis-Bextor's debut studio album, Read My Lips (2001). Released on 3 December 2001, the song peaked at number two on the UK singles chart and became a top-10 hit worldwide, charting within the top three in Australia, New Zealand, and four European countries. In the United States, the single reached number nine on the Billboard Maxi-Singles Sales chart. "Murder on the Dancefloor" is reported to have been the most played song in Europe in 2002.

In January 2024, following its use in the film Saltburn, "Murder on the Dancefloor" again reached number two on the UK singles chart, becoming Ellis-Bextor's first top-10 appearance since 2007. It entered the US Billboard Hot 100 the same month, making it Ellis-Bextor's first appearance on that chart. It also peaked at number 10 on the Billboard Global 200, her first top-ten and overall first entry on the chart. Also in 2024, Alexander's band New Radicals released their own version of the song.

== Background and release ==
In 1994, Gregg Alexander first wrote the song's hook and melody during a moment of frustration when his Ford Mustang would not start. Realising he would not be able to go to the Detroit house clubs that evening, Alexander reached for an acoustic guitar left in the back seat and began to sing "It's murder on the dancefloor, but you better not kill the groove." He later told The Guardian that it was "just a dummy lyric that was kind of sung for fun, but then I couldn't better it." In 1998, Alexander planned to record the song with his New Radicals group on their sole studio album Maybe You've Been Brainwashed Too, but ultimately chose to record "You Get What You Give" and release that as the lead single instead. After disbanding the New Radicals in 1999, Alexander moved to Notting Hill in London and met Ellis-Bextor, providing her with his unfinished demo. They ultimately re-tooled parts of the song and completed the lyrics together later that year. It was released as a single on 3 December 2001 by Polydor Records. In 2019, a re-recorded orchestral version was released on Ellis-Bextor's compilation album The Song Diaries. In 2024, Alexander's demo version of "Murder on the Dancefloor" was released on streaming services under the name New Radicals.

== Chart performance ==
The song is Ellis-Bextor's greatest hit internationally, reaching the top 10 in several European countries, Australia, New Zealand, and Canada, as well as on the US Billboard Maxi-Singles Sales chart. In the UK it peaked at number two and spent 13 weeks in the top 40. Since its release, it has accumulated one million chart units and 71 million combined audio and video streams in the UK. It was a hit in Australia, peaking at number three, staying in the top 50 for 20 weeks, being accredited platinum by the Australian Recording Industry Association (ARIA), and becoming the 12th-highest-selling single of 2002.

After appearing in the film Saltburn (2023), the song gained new popularity and re-entered the UK Dance Singles Chart, reaching number one on the chart dated 18 January 2024. The same week, it re-peaked at number two on the UK singles chart. It entered the US Billboard Hot 100 at number 98 on the chart dated 13 January 2024, making it Ellis-Bextor's first song to chart on the Hot 100, before peaking at number 51 three weeks later. Commenting on the song's new popularity as a result of its use in the film, Ellis-Bextor was quoted as saying, "It actually feels really magical. And if I'm honest, I don't think I've completely processed it really...It's extraordinary. It's a song I've been singing for over 20 years, I still love singing it. I love the way people react when I do it live. But for new people to be discovering it, for it to be making new memories with people is kind of beautiful". In February, a cover performed by Royel Otis on Triple J's Like a Version charted in the ARIA Top 50 Singles and the Official New Zealand Music Chart.

== Music video ==
Ellis–Bextor dances with a male partner in the music video

The music video was directed by Sophie Muller, and it centres around a dance competition which was inspired by the film They Shoot Horses Don't They? (1969) about a dance marathon. The winner's prize consists of a pair of golden high-heel shoes, a bouquet and a substantial amount of money. Desperate to win and sizing up the competition, Ellis-Bextor proceeds to sneakily injure and disqualify the majority of the other dancers. She trips one then unties another's dress and snatches it off her, causing her to run off. Next she slyly poisons a trio of potential rivals by spiking the punch during a refreshment period. Then she causes another to slip on a pat of butter and finally frames a dancer for cheating on his partner by planting a G-string on his person; this results in his partner slapping him and exiting the dance floor.

Ellis-Bextor also turns her attention to the trio of judges. By using what seems to be chloroform, she incapacitates the only female judge on the panel. Noticing that the lead judge (played by Colin Stinton) has a weak spot for beautiful women, Ellis-Bextor approaches him when he is alone and beguiles him. Lovestruck, the lead judge succeeds in persuading the remaining judge to have Ellis-Bextor declared the winner, much to her fellow dancers' disapproval.

The video concludes with the other dancers grudgingly applauding (before promptly deserting) Ellis-Bextor and her dance partner, as she happily clutches her cash prize and the golden shoes on the winner's podium.

== Track listings ==
=== Original release ===
- UK and Australasian CD single
1. "Murder on the Dancefloor" – 3:53
2. "Never Let Me Down" – 3:43
3. "Murder on the Dancefloor" (Parky & Birchy remix) – 7:24
4. "Murder on the Dancefloor" (video)
- UK 12-inch single

A1. "Murder on the Dancefloor" (G-Club vocal mix) – 5:09
A2. "Murder on the Dancefloor" (Jewels & Stone mix) – 5:39
B1. "Murder on the Dancefloor" (Phunk Investigation vocal mix) – 5:07
B2. "Murder on the Dancefloor" (extended album version) – 5:32

- UK cassette single and European CD single
1. "Murder on the Dancefloor" – 3:53
2. "Murder on the Dancefloor" (Jewels & Stone mix) – 5:39
- German maxi-CD single
1. "Murder on the Dancefloor" (radio edit) – 3:37
2. "Murder on the Dancefloor" (extended album version) – 5:32
3. "Murder on the Dancefloor" (Jewels & Stone mix edit) – 4:50
4. "Murder on the Dancefloor" (G-Club vocal mix edit) – 5:10
5. "Murder on the Dancefloor" (Phunk Investigation vocal edit) – 5:07
6. "Murder on the Dancefloor" (Parky & Birchy remix) – 7:22
7. "Murder on the Dancefloor" (Twin Murder remix) – 7:11
- US CD single
1. "Murder on the Dancefloor" (radio edit) – 3:37
2. "Murder on the Dancefloor" (extended album version) – 5:32
3. "Murder on the Dancefloor" (Jewels & Stone remix) – 5:39
4. "Murder on the Dancefloor" (Parky & Birchy remix) – 7:24

=== 2024 re-release ===
- Digital download and streaming single
1. "Murder on the Dancefloor" – 3:51
2. "Never Let Me Down" – 3:43
3. "Murder on the Dancefloor" (Jewels & Stone mix) – 5:39
4. "Murder on the Dancefloor" (Danny D remix) – 7:54
5. "Murder on the Dancefloor" (extended album version) – 5:33
6. "Murder on the Dancefloor" (HQ remix) – 7:30
7. "Murder on the Dancefloor" (Twin Murder club mix) – 7:12
- Digital download and streaming single (edits)
1. "Murder on the Dancefloor" – 3:51
2. "Murder on the Dancefloor" (radio edit) – 3:38
3. "Murder on the Dancefloor" (extended album version) – 5:33
4. "Murder on the Dancefloor" (sped up version) – 3:13
5. "Murder on the Dancefloor" (slowed down version) – 4:17
6. "Murder on the Dancefloor" (a cappella version) – 3:44
7. "Murder on the Dancefloor" (instrumental version) – 3:48
- Digital download and streaming single
1. "Murder on the Dancefloor" (sped up V2) – 3:24
- Digital download and streaming single
1. "Murder on the Dancefloor" (sped up version) – 3:13
- Digital download and streaming single
1. "Murder on the Dancefloor" (PNAU remix) – 4:20
- Digital download and streaming single
1. "Murder on the Dancefloor" (David Guetta remix) – 2:54
2. "Murder on the Dancefloor" (David Guetta extended remix) – 3:58
- 7-inch single
1. "Murder on the Dancefloor" – 3:51
2. "Murder on the Dancefloor" (Jewels & Stone mix edit) – 4:50
- CD single
1. "Murder on the Dancefloor" – 3:51
2. "Murder on the Dancefloor" (Jewels & Stone mix) – 5:39
3. "Murder on the Dancefloor" (Danny D remix) – 7:54
4. "Murder on the Dancefloor" (extended album version) – 5:33

== Credits and personnel ==
Credits are lifted from the Read My Lips album booklet.

Studios

- Recorded at Mayfair Studios (London, England)
- Mixed at Townhouse Studios (London, England)
- Mastered at Sony Music Studios (London, England)

Personnel

- Sophie Ellis-Bextor – writing
- Gregg Alexander – writing
- Yoad Nevo – guitars, percussion, programming
- John Themis – guitars
- Guy Pratt – bass
- Wired Strings – strings
- Rosie Wetters – string leader
- Nick Franglen – programming
- Matt Rowe – production
- Jeremy Wheatley – additional production, mixing
- Marco Rakascan – vocal recording
- James Loughrey – engineering
- Laurence Brazil – engineering assistant
- John Davis – mastering

== Charts ==
=== Weekly charts ===
2001–2003 weekly chart performance for "Murder on the Dancefloor"
Chart (2001–2003)	Peak position
Australia (ARIA)	3
Australian Dance (ARIA)	1
Austria (Ö3 Austria Top 40)	10
Belgium (Ultratop 50 Flanders)	18
Belgium (Ultratop 50 Wallonia)	7
Canada (Nielsen SoundScan)	5
Colombia (Notimex)	4
Croatia International Airplay (HRT)	3
Czech Republic (IFPI)	21
Denmark (Tracklisten)	3
Europe (Eurochart Hot 100)	12
Finland (Suomen virallinen lista)	15
France (SNEP)	5
Germany (GfK)	11
Greece (IFPI)	34
Hungary (Rádiós Top 40)	8
Hungary (Single Top 40)	16
Ireland (IRMA)	2
Italy (FIMI)	5
Netherlands (Dutch Top 40)	4
Netherlands (Single Top 100)	7
New Zealand (Recorded Music NZ)	2
Norway (VG-lista)	2
Peru (Notimex)	1
Poland Airplay (Music & Media)	3
Romania (Romanian Top 100)	26
Scottish Singles Sales (Official Charts)	2
Sweden (Sverigetopplistan)	8
Switzerland (Schweizer Hitparade)	7
UK Singles (Official Charts)	2
UK Dance (Official Charts)	15
US Dance Club Songs (Billboard)	26
US Dance Singles Sales (Billboard)	9
US Hot 100 Singles Sales (Billboard)	39

2023–2024 weekly chart performance for "Murder on the Dancefloor"
Chart (2023–2024)	Peak position
Argentina Hot 100 (Billboard)	51
Australia (ARIA)	7
Austria (Ö3 Austria Top 40)	8
Belgium (Ultratop 50 Flanders)	32
Belgium (Ultratop 50 Wallonia)	38
Canada Hot 100 (Billboard)	21
Canada CHR/Top 40 (Billboard)	32
Central America Anglo Airplay (Monitor Latino)	17
Chile Anglo Airplay (Monitor Latino)	4
Colombia Anglo Airplay (Monitor Latino)	2
CIS Airplay (TopHit)	105
Costa Rica Anglo Airplay (Monitor Latino)	5
Croatia International Airplay (Top lista)	22
Czech Republic Singles Digital (ČNS IFPI)	36
Denmark (Tracklisten)	17
Dominican Republic Anglo Airplay (Monitor Latino)	4
Ecuador Anglo Airplay (Monitor Latino)	14
Estonia Airplay (TopHit)	35
France (SNEP)	29
Global 200 (Billboard)	10
Germany (GfK)	19
Greece International (IFPI)	21
Iceland (Tónlistinn)	9
Ireland (IRMA)	2
Italy (FIMI)	38
Latin America Anglo Airplay (Monitor Latino)	2
Latvia Airplay (LaIPA)	9
Latvia Streaming (LaIPA)	7
Lithuania (AGATA)	7
Luxembourg (Billboard)	21
Mexico Anglo Airplay (Monitor Latino)	10
Netherlands (Dutch Top 40)	24
Netherlands (Single Top 100)	7
New Zealand (Recorded Music NZ)	7
Nicaragua Anglo Airplay (Monitor Latino)	11
Norway (VG-lista)	8
Paraguay Anglo Airplay (Monitor Latino)	6
Peru Anglo Airplay (Monitor Latino)	5
Poland (Polish Airplay Top 100)	7
Poland (Polish Streaming Top 100)	36
Portugal (AFP)	43
Puerto Rico Anglo Airplay (Monitor Latino)	11
Slovakia Airplay (ČNS IFPI)	56
Slovakia Singles Digital (ČNS IFPI)	45
Sweden (Sverigetopplistan)	24
Switzerland (Schweizer Hitparade)	12
Turkey International Airplay (Radiomonitor Türkiye)	6
UK Singles (Official Charts)	2
UK Dance (Official Charts)	1
Uruguay Anglo Airplay (Monitor Latino)	8
US Billboard Hot 100	51
US Adult Pop Airplay (Billboard)	16
US Hot Dance/Electronic Songs (Billboard)	3
US Pop Airplay (Billboard)	17
Venezuela Anglo Airplay (Monitor Latino)	10

2026 weekly chart performance for "Murder on the Dancefloor"
Chart (2026)	Peak position
Colombia Anglo Airplay (National-Report)	3

=== Year-end charts ===
Year-end chart performance for "Murder on the Dancefloor"
Chart (2001)	Position
Ireland (IRMA)	62
UK Singles (OCC)	60

Chart (2002)	Position
Australia (ARIA)	12
Australian Dance (ARIA)	3
Belgium (Ultratop 50 Flanders)	72
Belgium (Ultratop 50 Wallonia)	38
Brazil (Crowley)	13
Canada (Nielsen SoundScan)	57
Europe (Eurochart Hot 100)	18
France (SNEP)	28
Germany (Media Control)	69
Ireland (IRMA)	43
Netherlands (Dutch Top 40)	21
Netherlands (Single Top 100)	38
New Zealand (RIANZ)	23
Sweden (Hitlistan)	57
Switzerland (Schweizer Hitparade)	34
UK Singles (OCC)	87
UK Airplay (Music Week)	57

Chart (2024)	Position
Australia (ARIA)	67
Estonia Airplay (TopHit)	189
France (SNEP)	108
Global 200 (Billboard)	174
Netherlands (Single Top 100)	78
Poland (Polish Airplay Top 100)	54
UK Singles (OCC)	16
US Hot Dance/Electronic Songs (Billboard)	8

Chart (2025)	Position
Chile Airplay (Monitor Latino)	80

== Certifications ==
Certifications and sales for "Murder on the Dancefloor"
Region	Certification	Certified units/sales
Australia (ARIA)	6× Platinum	420,000^{‡}
Belgium (BRMA)	Gold	25,000^{*}
Canada (Music Canada)	Platinum	80,000^{‡}
Denmark (IFPI Danmark)	Platinum	90,000^{‡}
France (SNEP)	Gold	310,927
Germany (BVMI)	Gold	300,000^{‡}
Italy (FIMI)	Gold	50,000^{‡}
New Zealand (RMNZ)	3× Platinum	90,000^{‡}
Portugal (AFP)	Gold	5,000^{‡}
Spain (Promusicae)	Platinum	60,000^{‡}
United Kingdom (BPI)	4× Platinum	2,400,000^{‡}
United States (RIAA)	Platinum	1,000,000^{‡}
^{*} Sales figures based on certification alone.^{‡} Sales+streaming figures based on certification alone.

Certifications for "Murder on the Dance floor" Royel Otis version
Region	Certification	Certified units/sales
Australia (ARIA)	Platinum	70,000^{‡}
^{‡} Sales+streaming figures based on certification alone.

== New Radicals version ==
"Murder on the Dancefloor"

Single by New Radicals
- Released: 23 August 2024
- Length: 4:09
- Label: Flatiron Recordings
- Songwriter: Gregg Alexander

New Radicals singles chronology
"Someday We'll Know" (1999)	"Murder on the Dancefloor" (2024)

In 2024, American band New Radicals released their version of "Murder on the Dancefloor". The song's co-writer, Gregg Alexander, is the band's lead singer, and its release marked their first single release since 1999. Alexander began writing the song in 1994, and it was originally considered to be released as the band's debut single, however, "You Get What You Give" was subsequently chosen.

=== Background ===
In an interview with The Guardian, Alexander said that the song was inspired by a night out in 1994 when his Ford Mustang failed to start, subsequently "depriving" him from enjoying an evening of clubbing. He commented that the songs inspiration was from "having a moment of annoyance that I couldn't go to the house clubs in Detroit", ultimately leaving him to "reach for the acoustic guitar in the back channel his emotion". Originally considered for the band's debut single, Alexander said he was stuck between "Murder on the Dancefloor" or "You Get What You Give" for their first single, confirming that he "almost flipped a coin between the two songs". He cited pressure from the band's record company, saying they wanted "something urgently", however, he claimed not to "have the time or the budget to finish both". He described "Murder on the Dancefloor" as a "monster", but argued that "You Get What You Give" was a "masterpiece", further adding it was "everything I'd always wanted to say inside five minutes".

=== Release ===
The band's version of "Murder on the Dancefloor" was released on 23 August 2024 primarily in support of the Kamala Harris 2024 presidential campaign. Alexander said in an interview with Billboard that there decision to release their version of the song was to "rally the cause of democracy and encourage all artists to get out the vote". He was keen to stress that the release of the song did not mark a New Radicals reunion, but was their "small part to support the fight for freedom". Their release of "Murder on the Dancefloor" marked their first official release in twenty-five years, with their last single "Someday We'll Know" being released as the second and final single from their debut album Maybe You've Been Brainwashed Too in 1999. The song was also released alongside the bands version of "Lost Stars" which Alexander also wrote, and was subsequently featured in the 2013 film Begin Again and was performed by Adam Levine.

== Other versions ==
"Murder on the Dancefloor" has also been covered by Kelly Chen in Chinese (最愛你的是我 "Zuì'Ài Nǐ De Shì Wǒ") and Swedish musician Papa Dee who released "Murder In The Dance Hall". American musician Blu DeTiger released a cover of "Murder on the Dancefloor" as part of Deezer's "InVersions 2000s", a series of contemporary reinterpretations of well-known 2000s songs.

== Release history ==
Release dates and formats for "Murder on the Dancefloor"
Region	Date	Format(s)	Version	Label(s)	Ref.
United Kingdom	3 December 2001	12-inch vinyl; CD; cassette	Original	Polydor	
Australia	11 February 2002	CD	Original	Polydor	
Canada	19 March 2002	CD	Original	Polydor	
United States	9 September 2002	Contemporary hit radio; rhythmic contemporary radio	Original	Casablanca	
Various	12 January 2024	Digital download; streaming	Remixes	Polydor	
Various	19 January 2024	Digital download; streaming	Sped up V2	Polydor	
Various	26 January 2024	Digital download; streaming	Sped up	Polydor	
Various	2 February 2024	Digital download; streaming	Edits	Polydor	
Italy	2 February 2024	Radio airplay	Original	Universal	
Various	9 February 2024	Digital download; streaming	PNAU remix	Polydor	
United Kingdom	14 February 2024	7-inch vinyl; CD	Original	Polydor	
United Kingdom	8 March 2024	Digital download; streaming	David Guetta remixes	Polydor	
