= Cry (Mandy Moore song) =

Single by Mandy Moore

from the album A Walk to Remember: Music from the Motion Picture and Mandy Moore
- B-side: "Someday We'll Know" (with Jon Foreman)
- Released: November 4, 2001
- Genre: Pop
- Length: 3:43
- Label: Epic
- Songwriter: James Renald
- Producers: James Renald; Peter Mokran

Mandy Moore singles chronology
"Crush" (2001)	"Cry" (2001)	"Have a Little Faith in Me" (2003)

Music video
- "Cry" on YouTube

"Cry" is a song by American recording artist Mandy Moore, released on November 4, 2001, by Epic Records. It was written by James Renald, and co-produced by Renald and Peter Mokran. The song was released as a single from the 2002 soundtrack A Walk to Remember: Music from the Motion Picture and was also the third and final single from her self-titled second studio album.

The single's B-side, "Someday We'll Know", is a cover song that was originally performed by New Radicals. It was later included on Moore's compilation album Candy (2005).

== Song information ==
Mandy Moore said in a Billboard interview that she carried around a copy of the song for over a year before she recorded it. "It felt like my ace in the hole. It's such a beautiful song on every level. I couldn't wait to get into the studio and sing it." She also said that James Renald, the co-writer and co-producer of the song, had to "peel" her out of the vocal booth because she "wanted to sing it over and over again."

== Track listing ==
CD single

1. "Cry" – 3:43
2. "Someday We'll Know" (with Jon Foreman) – 3:42

== Charts ==
=== Weekly charts ===
Chart (2002)	Peak position
Canada CHR (Nielsen BDS)	14
