= Chaos in Bloom =

Studio album by Goo Goo Dolls
- Released: August 12, 2022
- Studio: Dreamland (Hurley, New York); EastWest (Hollywood); Arcade (New York, New York); GCR Audio (Buffalo, New York); Palomino (Los Angeles)
- Genre: Alternative rock; pop rock
- Length: 39:17
- Label: Warner
- Producer: Brad Fernquist; Gregg Wattenberg; John Rzeznik

Goo Goo Dolls chronology
| Rarities (2021) | Chaos in Bloom (2022) | Summer Anthem (2025) |

Chaos in Bloom is the thirteenth studio album by American rock band the Goo Goo Dolls. It was released on August 12, 2022, by Warner Records.

== Recording and release ==
In an interview with Kyle Meredith of Consequence in June 2021, band member John Rzeznik confirmed that work was underway for the band's then-untitled fourteenth studio album. He also revealed that the band decided to write and record the material in a "more raw" fashion. In another interview with Spin, Rzeznik revealed that he produced most of the album himself.

The album's first single "Yeah, I Like You" was released on July 1, 2022. The second single, "You Are the Answer", was released on July 29, 2022.

== Critical reception ==
Professional ratings
Review scores
| Source | Rating |
|---|---|
| AllMusic | 3.5/5 stars |

Writing for AllMusic, Stephen Thomas Erlewine rated the album three-and-a-half stars out of five, and wrote: "Occasionally, [Chaos in Bloom] drifts into reflective territory that betrays its pandemic creation, but where most lockdown albums linger in slow, quiet territory, Goo Goo Dolls ultimately rally with melodic, fist-pumping rock intended to empower as much as entertain. If, apart from the occasional slick synthesized gloss, Chaos in Bloom doesn't sound markedly different than other Goo Goo Dolls albums, give the band — and especially producer [John] Rzeznik — credit for this: over 30 years into their career, they know what works for them and what doesn't, so they showcase their attributes to their best effect on this tight, lean record."

== Track listing ==
Chaos in Bloom track listing
| No. | Title | Writer(s) | Length |
|---|---|---|---|
| 1. | "Yeah, I Like You" | John Rzeznik; Gregg Wattenberg | 4:24 |
| 2. | "War" | Rzeznik; Wattenberg; Alex Aldi | 4:34 |
| 3. | "Save Me from Myself" | Rzeznik; Derek AE Fuhrman | 3:16 |
| 4. | "Let the Sun" | Rzeznik; Andy Stochansky; Chris Szczech | 3:33 |
| 5. | "Loving Life" | Rzeznik; Robby Takac | 3:35 |
| 6. | "Going Crazy" | Rzeznik; Wattenberg | 3:58 |
| 7. | "Day After Day" | Rzeznik; Fuhrman | 3:27 |
| 8. | "Past Mistakes" | Takac | 3:32 |
| 9. | "You Are the Answer" | Rzeznik; Craig Macintyre | 4:23 |
| 10. | "Superstar" | Rzeznik; Stochansky; Brad Fernquist | 4:31 |
| Total length: | | | 39:17 |

== Personnel ==
Goo Goo Dolls

- John Rzeznik – guitar (all tracks), vocals (tracks 1–4, 6–7, 9–10); production (all tracks)
- Robby Takac – bass (all tracks), vocals (5, 8)

Additional musicians

- Craig Macintyre – drums (all tracks), piano (9)
- Jamie Muhoberac – keyboards (all tracks)
- Billy Perez – keyboards (1–8, 10)
- Luis Conte – percussion (1, 2, 5–8, 10)
- Brad Fernquist – guitar (1–3, 5, 6, 8, 10)
- Genevieve Schatz – vocals (3), backing vocals (4, 9)
- Grace Enger – backing vocals (3)
- John Button – bass (3, 9)
- Chris Szczech – guitar (4, 8, 10)
- Jim McGorman – backing vocals (5, 8)
- Will Scott – drums (7)
- Jason Soda – guitar (9)
- Cindy Cashdollar – steel guitar (10)

Technical

- Brad Fernquist – production
- Gregg Wattenberg – production (1, 2, 6, 7, 9, 10)
- Chris Szczech – additional production, engineering
- Emily Lazar – mastering
- Chris Allgood – mastering
- Mark Endert – mixing (1, 2, 9)
- Joe Zook – mixing (3–8, 10)
- Brad Lauchert – additional engineering (3, 5, 7, 8)
- Ken Hemlinger – engineering assistance (1, 2, 4–8, 10)
- Kody Reiners – engineering assistance (3, 4, 6, 7, 9)

== Charts ==
Chart performance for Chaos in Bloom
| Chart (2022) | Peak position |
|---|---|
| Australian Digital Albums (ARIA) | 25 |
| Scottish Albums (OCC) | 81 |
| UK Album Downloads (OCC) | 26 |
