= Candy (Mandy Moore album) =

Compilation album by Mandy Moore
- Released: April 5, 2005
- Recorded: 1999–2003
- Genre: Pop
- Label: Epic
- Producer: Jeff Jones

Mandy Moore chronology
The Best of Mandy Moore (2004)	Candy (2005)	Wild Hope (2007)

Professional ratings
Review scores
Source	Rating
AllMusic	Link

Candy is the second compilation album by American singer Mandy Moore. It was released on April 5, 2005, by Epic Records. It contains songs of Moore's that, with the exception of "Candy" and "I Wanna Be with You" were never released as singles.

AllMusic described the release as "intermittently entertaining, but not really satisfying" and instead recommended The Best of Mandy Moore.

== Track listing ==
1. "Candy" (Tony Battaglia, Dave Katz, Dennis Kleiman and Denise Rich) – 3:56 ^{1}
2. "Lock Me in Your Heart" (Battaglia and Shaun Fisher) – 3:33 ^{1}
3. "Love You for Always" (Battaglia, Fisher) – 3:22 ^{1}
4. "Everything My Heart Desires" (Karsten Dahlgaard, Michael Jay and Johnny Mosegaard Pederson) – 3:41 ^{2}
5. "I Wanna Be with You" (Tiffany Arbuckle, Shelly Peiken and Keith Thomas) – 4:15 ^{2}
6. "Saturate Me" (Randall Barlow, Susie Green and Tim Mitchel) – 4:01 ^{3}
7. "Turn the Clock Around" (John W. Baxter, David Rice and Nick Trevisick) – 3:44 ^{3}
8. "Yo-Yo" (Cutler, Preven) – 4:18 ^{3}
9. "Someday We'll Know" (with Jonathan Foreman)" (Gregg Alexander, Danielle Brisebois and Debra Holland) – 3:43 ^{4}
10. "Mona Lisas and Mad Hatters" (John, Taupin) – 4:50^{5}

^{1} taken from the album So Real
^{2} taken from the album I Wanna Be with You
^{3} taken from the album Mandy Moore
^{4} taken from the album A Walk to Remember: Music from the Motion Picture
^{5} taken from the album Coverage

== Personnel ==
- Jeff Jones – Compilation Producer
- Richard King – Compilation Engineer
- Ryn Maartens – Art Direction
