= A Walk to Remember (soundtrack) =

A Walk to Remember: Music from the Motion Picture

Soundtrack album by Various artists
- Released: January 15, 2002
- Genre: Pop, contemporary Christian, post-grunge
- Length: 52:01 (Standard); 62:32 (2003 Special Expanded Edition)
- Label: Epic; Sony Music Soundtrax
- Producer: Jon Leshay

Singles from A Walk to Remember: Music from the Motion Picture
- 1. "Cry" Released: November 4, 2001

A Walk to Remember: Music from the Motion Picture is the soundtrack to the 2002 film A Walk to Remember, released by Epic Records and Sony Music Soundtrax on January 15, 2002. The album features six songs performed by the film's star Mandy Moore, along with others by Switchfoot, Rachael Lampa and many more.

The soundtrack was re-released on October 21, 2003, as a special expanded edition and featured three songs that were not originally included on the first release of the soundtrack but featured in the film. The song "Only Hope" by Moore had dialogue added that featuring Shane West as his character Landon Carter taken from the scene from where the song is featured in the film, as well as West's narration at the end of the film.

The album debuted at number 181 on the Billboard 200 chart the week of February 2, 2002, and peaked at number 56, the following week.

== Background ==
Mandy Moore's manager Jon Leshay served as the film A Walk to Remember's music supervisor, who "instantly wanted" Switchfoot's music to be a vital part of the film after hearing them. He would later become Switchfoot's manager. When they were approached to do the film, the band was unfamiliar with Moore or her music (despite her status as a pop star with several hits on the charts). Before their involvement with A Walk to Remember, Switchfoot was only recognized in their native San Diego and in Contemporary Christian music circles, but have since gained mainstream recognition, with their double platinum fourth album, The Beautiful Letdown (2003) which included hits such as "Meant to Live" and "Dare You to Move".

The lead single "Cry" was originally released on Moore's self-titled third studio album as the third and final single on November 4, 2001. She carried around a copy of the song for over a year before she recorded it. "It felt like my ace in the hole. It's such a beautiful song on every level. I couldn't wait to get into the studio and sing it." She also said that James Renald, the co-writer and co-producer of the song, had to "peel" her out of the vocal booth because she "wanted to sing it over and over again." The single and the soundtrack's release was intended to relaunch her album to a wider audience.

The album further featured three more tracks by Moore: "It's Gonna Be Love", a cover of New Radicals' "Someday We'll Know" (written by Gregg Alexander) with Switchfoot's Jonathan Foreman and her cover of "Only Hope", while also including Switchfoot's original version. It further features songs from Switchfoot, Rachael Lampa, New Radicals and Toploader.

== Track listing ==
Standard edition
No.	Title	Recording artist(s)	Length
1.	"Dare You to Move"	Switchfoot	4:09
2.	"Cry"	Mandy Moore	3:43
3.	"Someday We'll Know" (cover of New Radicals)	Moore and Jonathan Foreman	3:52
4.	"Dancing in the Moonlight" (cover of King Harvest)	Toploader	3:52
5.	"Learning to Breathe"	Switchfoot	4:36
6.	"Only Hope" (cover of Switchfoot)	Moore	3:53
7.	"It's Gonna Be Love"	Moore	3:51
8.	"You"	Switchfoot	4:14
9.	"If You Believe"	Rachael Lampa	3:49
10.	"No One"	Cold	3:17
11.	"So What Does It All Mean?"	West, Gould, & Fitzgerald	3:00
12.	"Mother, We Just Can't Get Enough"	New Radicals	5:45
13.	"Only Hope"	Switchfoot	4:14
Total length:			52:01

2003 Special Expanded Edition
No.	Title	Recording artist(s)	Length
1.	"Dare You to Move"	Switchfoot	4:09
2.	"Cry"	Moore	3:43
3.	"Someday We'll Know" (cover of New Radicals)	Moore and Foreman	3:52
4.	"Dancin' in the Moonlight" (cover of King Harvest)	Toploader	3:52
5.	"Learning to Breathe"	Switchfoot	4:36
6.	"Only Hope" (cover of Switchfoot)	Moore as Jamie Sullivan with dialogue by Shane West as Landon Carter	3:53
7.	"It's Gonna Be Love"	Moore	3:51
8.	"You"	Switchfoot	4:14
9.	"If You Believe"	Rachael Lampa	3:49
10.	"No One"	Cold	3:17
11.	"So What Does It All Mean?"	West, Gould, & Fitzgerald	3:00
12.	"Mother, We Just Can't Get Enough"	New Radicals	5:45
13.	"Cannonball" (2003 Special Expanded Edition bonus track)	The Breeders	3:37
14.	"Friday on My Mind" (2003 Special Expanded Edition bonus track)	Noogie	3:14
15.	"Empty Spaces" (2003 Special Expanded Edition bonus track)	Fuel	3:26
16.	"Only Hope"	Switchfoot	4:16
17.	"Cry" (Music Video) (Multi-media track)	Moore	3:41
Total length:			1:02:32

== Reception ==
Revisiting the album 15 years later, Cosmopolitan writer Peggy Troung in her 2017 write-up felt "For a Nicholas Sparks adaptation, this movie is coming-of-age romance at its best. It's cheesy, but it's the kind of cheese you want to warm in your oven 10 minutes before your dinner party guests arrive, the kind of cheese you want to share with everyone you know and buy more of the second it runs out. As an album, A Walk to Remember will never be The Graduate or even Garden State, but it doesn't have to be. All a good soundtrack needs to do is make you think of the story and characters you fell in love with and look back on a time when commuting on the no. 99 bus was all you had to worry about." Sal Cinquemani of Slant Magazine gave 3 out of 5 to the album, mentioning "Mandy Moore continues to prove she's one step ahead of the teen-pop pack with the stirring piano ballad "Only Hope". William Ruhlmann of AllMusic wrote "The soundtrack album is anchored by her recordings. Certainly, the singer is trying to distance herself from her competitors on a track like this, which shows her tackling a ballad in a surprisingly thoughtful and mature way. You only need to contrast her approach with that of Rachael Lampa, who throws in all the tired vocal tricks without an ounce of real feeling on "If You Believe," to see the difference. The rest of the album seems to have been divided largely between the moody rock of Jonathan Foreman and his band Switchfoot and the very busy rock of Gregg Alexander (aka New Radicals), though Toploader's trip-hop arrangement of the old King Harvest hit "Dancing in the Moonlight" is a cute idea."

== Charts ==
Weekly chart performance for A Walk to Remember
Chart (2002)	Peak position
Canadian Albums (Billboard)	35
US Billboard 200	34
US Top Soundtracks (Billboard)	4

Year-end chart performance for A Walk to Remember
Chart (2002)	Peak position
Canadian Albums (Nielsen SoundScan)	104
US Billboard 200	165
US Soundtrack Albums (Billboard)	14

== Certifications ==
Certifications
Region	Certification	Certified units/sales
Canada (Music Canada)	Gold	50,000^{^}
United States (RIAA)	Platinum	1,000,000^{^}
^{^} Shipments figures based on certification alone.
