= I Don't Wanna Die =

I Don't Wanna Die may refer to:

- "I Don't Wanna Die", a song by the Unicorns from their album Who Will Cut Our Hair When We're Gone?
- "I Don't Wanna Die", a song by Hollywood Undead from their album American Tragedy
- "I Don't Wanna Die", a song by G Herbo from his album 25
- "I Don't Wanna Die...", a song by Kim Petras from her album Turn Off the Light, Vol. 1

== See also ==
- "I Don't Wanna Die Anymore", a song by New Radicals from Maybe You've Been Brainwashed Too
