= Miracle Pill =

Studio album by Goo Goo Dolls
- Released: September 13, 2019
- Recorded: 2019
- Studio: Gold Diggers, Capitol, and Orpheum Theatre (Note: Pipe organ on "Autumn Leaves") (Los Angeles)
- Genre: Pop rock
- Length: 37:14
- Label: Warner
- Producer: Derek Fuhrmann; Sam Hollander; Grant Michaels; Drew Pearson; Alex Aldi

Goo Goo Dolls chronology
Boxes (2016)	Miracle Pill (2019)	It's Christmas All Over (2020)

Singles from Miracle Pill
- 1. "Miracle Pill" Released: June 21, 2019; 2. "Money, Fame & Fortune" Released: July 19, 2019; 3. "Indestructible" Released: August 9, 2019; 4. "Fearless" Released: May 6, 2020; 5. "Autumn Leaves" Released: Sep 22, 2020

Miracle Pill is the twelfth studio album by American rock band Goo Goo Dolls. The album was released on September 13, 2019, by Warner Records.

== Recording ==
Songwriter and fan Valerie Broussard contributed vocals to "Money, Fame & Fortune". The album's first single "Miracle Pill" was released on June 21, 2019. The music video for "Miracle Pill" was released on July 16, 2019. The album's second single "Money, Fame & Fortune" was released on July 19, 2019. The album's third single "Indestructible" was released on August 9, 2019.

Professional ratings
Review scores
Source	Rating
AllMusic	4/5 stars

== Track listing ==
No.	Title	Writer(s)	Length
1.	"Indestructible"	John Rzeznik; Sam Hollander; Grant Michaels	3:34
2.	"Fearless"	Rzeznik; Derek Fuhrmann	3:40
3.	"Miracle Pill"	Rzeznik; Hollander; Michaels	3:17
4.	"Money, Fame & Fortune"	Rzeznik; Fuhrmann; Drew Pearson; Brad Fernquist	3:17
5.	"Step in Line"	Robby Takac	3:37
6.	"Over You"	Rzeznik; Fuhrmann	2:54
7.	"Lights"	Rzeznik; Pearson	3:29
8.	"Lost"	Rzeznik; Fuhrmann	3:38
9.	"Life's a Message"	Takac	2:59
10.	"Autumn Leaves"	Rzeznik; Pearson	3:15
11.	"Think It Over"	Rzeznik; Alex Aldi; Hollander	3:33
Total length:			37:14

Deluxe edition bonus tracks
No.	Title	Length
12.	"Tonight, Together"	3:36
13.	"The Right Track"	3:08
14.	"Just a Man"	4:01

== Personnel ==
Credits taken from Miracle Pill CD booklet.

Goo Goo Dolls

- John Rzeznik – guitar (all tracks), vocals (1–4, 6–8, 10–11)
- Robby Takac – bass (all tracks), vocals (5, 9), background vocals (2, 8)

Additional musicians

- Aaron Sterling – drums (1, 3)
- Brad Fernquist – guitar (all tracks)
- Grant Michaels – keyboards (1, 3)
- Maiya Sykes – background vocals (1, 3)
- Jim McGorman – background vocals (all tracks), keyboards (2, 4–11), pipe organ (10)
- Josh Freese – drums (2, 4–11)
- Derek Fuhrmann – guitar (2, 4–6, 8), additional guitar (9), background vocals (2, 4–6, 8, 9)
- Kenna Ramsey – background vocals (2, 7, 8)
- Táta Vega – background vocals (2, 7, 8)
- Oren Waters – background vocals (2, 7, 8)
- Valerie Broussard – vocals (4)
- Brad Lauchert – programming (5, 9)
- Charlie Bisharat – violin (7)
- Joel Derouin – violin (7)
- Thomas Lea – viola (7)
- Jacob Braun – cello (7)
- Melony Collins – background vocals (7)
- Sylvia Mac Calla – background vocals (7)
- Terry Young – background vocals (7)
- Drew Pearson – keyboards (10)
- Gunnar Olsen – percussion (11)
- Brian Lawlor – piano (11)
- Mark Robertson – violin (11)
- Corinne Sobolewski – viola (11)
- David Low – cello (11)

Technical

- Sam Hollander – production (1, 3)
- Grant Michaels – production (1, 3)
- Derek Fuhrmann – production (2, 4–6, 8–9)
- Drew Pearson – production (7, 10)
- Alex Aldi – production (11)
- Josh Edmonson – recording and engineering (1, 3)
- Dave Trumfio – recording and engineering (1, 3)
- Chris Szczech – recording and engineering (2, 4–11)
- Brad Lauchert – recording and engineering (5, 9)
- Billy Perez – recording and engineering (11)
- Alex Poeppel – recording and engineering (11)
- Celso Estrada – assistant engineer (1, 3)
- Tim Keen – assistant engineer (1, 3)
- Nick Rives – assistant engineer (2, 4–11)
- Claudius Mittendorfer – mixing (1, 3)
- Adam Hawkins – mixing (2, 4–11)
- Chris Gehringer – mastering (all tracks)
- Will Quinnell – mastering assistant (all tracks)

Artwork

- Alex Tenta - design, layout
- Dan Cooper - photography
- Ed Gregory - photography

== Charts ==
Chart (2019)	Peak position
Hungarian Albums (MAHASZ)	15
Scottish Albums (Official Charts)	39
US Billboard 200	92
