= New Radicals =

American alternative rock band

- New Radicals touring group c. 1998. Left to right: Jim McGorman, Gregg Alexander, Stuart Johnson, Sasha Krivtsov, Danielle Brisebois, and Brad Fernquist.

Background information
- Origin: Los Angeles, California, United States
- Genres: Alternative rock; pop rock; power pop
- Years active: 1997–1999; 2021; 2024; 2026–present
- Labels: MCA; Flatiron Recordings
- Members: Gregg Alexander; Danielle Brisebois

New Radicals is an American alternative rock band formed in 1997 in Los Angeles. The band is centered on the duo of Gregg Alexander (lead vocals, guitar, songwriting, production) and Danielle Brisebois (keyboards, percussion, backing vocals), and augmented by session and touring musicians.

The band released their first album, Maybe You've Been Brainwashed Too, in 1998. It was heavily influenced by the rock and soul of the 1970s, containing—among radio-friendly modern rock tracks and love songs—strong criticism of corporate America. Their debut single "You Get What You Give" topped the charts in Canada and New Zealand, became a top-5 hit in Ireland, and the United Kingdom, and reached the top 40 in the US.

Tired of touring and promotional interviews, Alexander disbanded the group in mid-1999 before the release of their second single, "Someday We'll Know", to focus on writing and producing songs for other artists. Alexander and Brisebois' songwriting partnership continued following the disbanding of the group, with the two being nominated for the Academy Award for Best Original Song in 2015 for their composition "Lost Stars" from the film Begin Again.

After their disbandment, the group received numerous offers for a reunion tour or new album, but Alexander repeatedly turned these down. New Radicals eventually reunited for a then-one off performance on January 20, 2021, to mark President Joe Biden's presidential inauguration. They came together again in support of the Democratic National Convention in August 2024, releasing newly-recorded versions of "Lost Stars" and "Murder on the Dancefloor". Alexander and Brisebois have recently revived the group once again, with Alexander officially claiming the band is "soft-launching" their return, with new music released in 2026, and a second album currently in development.

== Career ==
=== Rise to mainstream fame (1997–1998) ===
New Radicals were formed in Los Angeles in 1997 by Gregg Alexander, who had previously released two unsuccessful solo albums, 1989's Michigan Rain and 1992's Intoxifornication. Michael Rosenblatt, MCA Records' A&R Senior Vice President, signed the band in December 1997, and Alexander received a $600,000 advance for their first (and only) album, Maybe You've Been Brainwashed Too. The album was released on October 20, 1998, and was well received by music critics, who praised the record for its wide range of atypical influences for a modern pop rock album, such as Todd Rundgren, World Party, and Hall & Oates. The reviewers compared its funk and soul-influenced upbeat pop rock to the early work of Prince and Mick Jagger.

Some critics disliked the album's themes, dismissing Alexander's criticism of society and the frequent references to drugs and sex that run throughout the album as "shallow posturing" and "empty social pronouncements", while others stated that these criticisms "would sound clichéd if they werent [sic] so insightful and articulated with such uninhibited truth." Popular opinion, by contrast, pushed the album to No. 10 on the UK Albums Chart and No. 41 on the Billboard 200 in the U.S., where it also achieved platinum status (1,000,000 copies sold). It was also certified gold in the United Kingdom (100,000 copies sold) and in Canada (50,000 copies sold).

=== Maybe You've Been Brainwashed Too (1998–1999) ===
To promote their album, New Radicals embarked on a tour through the United States, starting in late 1998. Apart from many concerts and festivals, the tour also included several live performances on the radio, appearances on The Tonight Show with Jay Leno and Nickelodeon's All That and a performance at the House of Blues in Chicago on New Year's Eve 1998—which is probably the only New Radicals show of which bootlegs are circulating. They also opened for the Goo Goo Dolls on their tour starting on March 30, 1999. They were known to play "You Get What You Give" twice per set.

The album was followed on November 17, 1998, by the release of their first single, "You Get What You Give" (co-written with Rick Nowels), which reached No. 36 on the U.S. Billboard Hot 100, No. 5 on the UK Singles Chart, and No. 1 on the RPM Canadian Singles Chart. The song received heavy radio airplay and rotation on MTV and much media attention. In large part this attention focused on the celebrity-slamming line "Fashion shoots with Beck and Hanson / Courtney Love and Marilyn Manson / You're all fakes run to your mansions / Come around we'll kick your ass in."

When asked about it in an interview, Marilyn Manson replied he was "not mad that [Alexander] said he'd kick my ass, I just don't want to be used in the same sentence with Courtney Love" and would "crack his skull open if I see him." Beck reported that "I was in a grocery store and he [Alexander] came running up to me, so apologetic, and saying, 'I hope you weren't offended. It wasn't supposed to be personal.' I was kind of pleased, because he's a big guy." The members of Hanson said they weren't really bothered by the song; they saw it as just a pop-culture reference. They also co-wrote the song "Lost Without Each Other" from their 2004 album Underneath with Alexander. Zac Hanson said that "It was cool working with Gregg... [he]'s definitely a character but he's a cool guy."

Following the mass media's excitement about the celebrity insults, Alexander explained that the verse, along with the lines directly preceding it ("Health insurance rip off lying / FDA big bankers buying / Fake computer crashes dining / Cloning while they're multiplying") were an experiment to see if the media would focus on the real issues, or on the celebrity ridicule. Similar complaints and attacks on Christian religion, American society, politics and corporations can be found in other songs on the album as well, and Alexander would often use promotional interviews to talk about these topics, complaining about—among other things—corrupt, greedy politicians and corporate officers, credit card interest, the poor American social security system, and lack of education.

=== Breakup and solo projects (1999–2021) ===
When the band canceled their appearance at the Atlanta open-air music festival RockFest, as well as their UK tour (scheduled to start on May 17, 1999), rumors started they would break up, while MCA Records claimed an unspecified member of the band being ill was the cause for the canceled shows. New Radicals went on to shoot the video for their second single "Someday We'll Know"; however, less than two weeks before its release, Gregg Alexander issued a press release on July 12, announcing the breakup of the group. Alexander said that New Radicals "will no longer be a recording, promoting, or performing entity" and that he would focus on producing and writing material for other artists. He went on to say that he "accomplished all of [his] goals with this record" and that "the fatigue of traveling & getting three hours sleep in a different hotel every night to do boring 'hanging and schmoozing' with radio and retail people, is definitely not for [him]", that he "lost interest in fronting a 'One Hit Wonder' to the point that [he] was wearing a hat while performing so that people wouldn't see [his] lack of enthusiasm" and that he would go on to form a production company to focus on producing and writing songs freelance for other artists. His first production work after New Radicals' breakup was the album Portable Life by fellow Radical Danielle Brisebois, originally set to be released in October 1999, but cancelled by RCA Records until eventually being released digitally almost a decade later in September 2008. Given the band's breakup and the resulting lack of promotion, "Someday We'll Know" failed to have a notable impact on the charts (it did not chart the Billboard Hot 100 and reached only No. 28 on the U.S. Adult Top 40 and No. 48 on the UK Singles Chart)

Although no third single was released, there are some (conflicting) clues as to what would have been the third single: certain promotional copies of Maybe You've Been Brainwashed Too come with a sticker reading "includes 'You Get What You Give', 'I Don't Wanna Die Anymore' and 'Someday We'll Know'", suggesting that "I Don't Wanna Die Anymore" would join the other two as a single release. Several websites selling the album also marked the track as "Album Version", indicating that there would be a single version at some point. However there also exist copies of "Mother We Just Can't Get Enough" as both a one-track promotional single and as a four-track commercial single with a barcode.

In addition to the songs released on the United States version of Maybe You've Been Brainwashed Too, two studio songs by New Radicals were produced. The song "To Think I Thought" was included as the B-side to "You Get What You Give" and as an additional track on the Japanese version of the album, and "The Decency League" was a B-side to the single "Someday We'll Know".

In the years following New Radicals' breakup, Alexander worked with artists including Ronan Keating, Sophie Ellis-Bextor and Enrique Iglesias; he often collaborated with producer/songwriter Rick Nowels. His most successful song as a producer/songwriter was the 2003 Grammy Award-winning "The Game of Love" by Santana and Michelle Branch. Rod Stewart also recorded Alexander and Nowels' "I Can't Deny It" for his 2001 album Human.

In 2003, a new Gregg Alexander song titled "A Love Like That" was released at PickTheHits.com, a website where users could rate new music. While it was uncredited, fans immediately recognized Alexander's voice and parts of the lyrics that had already appeared in the booklet for Maybe You've Been Brainwashed Too. The song was (as official sites listing Alexander's song repertoire reveal) written by Alexander and Nowels.

=== Reunion and cover releases (2021–2024) ===
New Radicals reunited on January 20, 2021, to perform "You Get What You Give" as part of the Inauguration of Joe Biden. The song was used by Vice President Kamala Harris's husband, Doug Emhoff, during 2020 campaign rallies, and was referred to by Joe Biden in his autobiography, Promise Me, Dad, as his family's "rallying 'theme song'" during his late son Beau Biden's terminal battle with glioblastoma. Alexander said that he hopes the group's performance of the song can be a "tiniest beacon of light in such a dark time". Alexander told Rolling Stone that he was unable to reunite the original New Radicals touring band for the performance due to COVID-19-related restrictions, and he and Brisebois were instead accompanied by musicians from the Philadelphia area.

Two new singles by New Radicals were released on August 23, 2024: A version of "Lost Stars", co-written by Alexander and Brisebois for the 2013 film Begin Again, and a version of "Murder on the Dancefloor", an Alexander co-composition that was originally released by Sophie Ellis-Bextor in 2001.

=== Regrouping and Maybe You’ve Been Brainwashed Two (2026–present) ===
In July 2026, Michelle Branch released a re-worked version of “The Game of Love” with New Radicals. The song was originally co-written by Alexander and released by Santana and Branch in 2002.. That same month, New Radicals released a brand new song entitled "One Night Only (Break Loose, Break Free!)" as part of the soundtrack for the film One Night Only.

In an August 2026 interview with Variety magazine, Alexander stated that he has officially "soft-relaunched" the band, with a follow-up album to Maybe You've Been Brainwashed Too in development, currently entitled Maybe You’ve Been Brainwashed TWO (The Heathen Will ‘Con$pirituality’ Troll). In a September 2026 interview with Music Business Worldwide, Alexander confirmed that Maybe You've Been Brainwashed Two will release through a Universal Music label within the first half of 2027. A separate interview that same month confirmed work on a special-edition double-vinyl release, containing the new album as well as an included vinyl copy of the first album.

== Usage in media ==
During their initial breakup, New Radicals' songs have been used for several commercials and trailers (for example the trailer to 1999's Big Daddy with Adam Sandler, the 2001 film Bubble Boy, the 2011 American musical comedy film The Muppets, and the 2006 film Click), TV shows (like Scrubs, Community, JAG, Dawson's Creek, and Daria), on soundtracks (such as A Walk to Remember, Scooby-Doo 2: Monsters Unleashed, Click and Surf's Up) and covered by artists such as Mandy Moore and Jon Foreman (lead singer of Switchfoot) and Hall & Oates (both covered "Someday We'll Know"–Moore and Foreman on the soundtrack to A Walk to Remember, Hall & Oates on their 2003 album Do It For Love). Ronan Keating also covered the song during his 2002 Destination Everywhere tour and included "You Get What You Give" in his celebrity playlist on iTunes, as did Joni Mitchell on her Artist's Choice CD, released by Starbucks' Hear Music. She also declared New Radicals "the only thing I heard in many years that I thought had greatness in it... I loved that song 'You Get What You Give.' It was a big hit, and I said, 'Where did they go?' It turns out the guy [Gregg Alexander] quit. I thought, 'Good for him.' I knew he was my kind of guy." In 2012, "You Get What You Give" was covered in the season three finale episode of Glee.

In 2005, LMC performed a remix of "You Get What You Give" under the title "Don't Let Go". A new version of the remix, with new vocals by Rachel McFarlane replacing the samples from the original version, was released in January 2006 as a single under the song's original title. The remix with new vocals peaked at No. 30 on the UK Singles Chart. Shawnna's 2006 song "Chicago" from the album Block Music samples the opening line from Moore and Foreman's version of "Someday We'll Know". In 2013, Brooklyn-based pop rock duo Savoir Adore covered "You Get What You Give" as part of season four of The A.V. Club's web series A.V. Undercover.

== Members ==
Alexander and Brisebois had recorded solo albums prior to the formation of New Radicals: Alexander's Michigan Rain (1989) and Intoxifornication (1992), and Brisebois' Arrive All Over You (1994). Brisebois had been a child actress in the late 1970s and early 1980s, and had portrayed the character of Stephanie Mills on the sitcoms All in the Family and Archie Bunker's Place. Alexander and Brisebois had co-written most of the songs on Arrive All Over You, and Brisebois had appeared as a backing vocalist on Intoxifornication.

Most of the musicians who worked on Maybe You've Been Brainwashed Too were friends of Alexander and Brisebois, including piano player Paul Gordon, drummers Matt Laug and Josh Freese, guitarist Rusty Anderson, guitarist Michael James (who also mixed the band's music); bassists Paul Bushnell, Dan Rothchild and John Pierce; percussionist Lenny Castro, pianist Greg Phillinganes, and producer Rick Nowels. Nowels also played piano on two songs on the album (and had previously produced Alexander's debut album Michigan Rain).

Other musicians who were at some point part of the live line-up include drummer Stuart Johnson, guitarist Bradley Fernquist, keyboardist Jim McGorman and bassist Sasha Krivtsov. The latter two were later part of the house band in Rock Star: INXS. Sasha and Jim also played with Kiss' Paul Stanley on his "Live To Win" solo tour in 2006.

== Discography ==
=== Studio albums ===
List of studio albums, with selected details and chart positions
Title	Details	Peak chart positions										Certifications (sales thresholds)
Title	Details	US	AUS	AUT	CAN	GER	NLD	NZ	SWE	SWI	UK	Certifications (sales thresholds)
Maybe You've Been Brainwashed Too	Release date: October 20, 1998; Label: MCA; Formats: CD	41	51	13	17	25	53	34	30	41	10	RIAA: Platinum; BPI: Gold; MC: Gold
Maybe You've Been Brainwashed Two	Release date: 2027; Label: Universal Music; Formats: CD, digital download, streaming	–	–	–	–	–	–	–	–	–	–	

=== Singles ===
List of singles, with selected details and chart positions
Year	Title	Peak chart positions										Certifications (sales thresholds)	Album
Year	Title	US	AUS	AUT	CAN	GER	NLD	NZ	SWE	SWI	UK	Certifications (sales thresholds)	Album
1998	"You Get What You Give"	36	13	33	1	21	22	1	27	18	5	BPI: 2× Platinum; RMNZ: 4× Platinum	Maybe You've Been Brainwashed Too
1999	"Someday We'll Know"	—	79	—	—	79	75	45	—	—	48		Maybe You've Been Brainwashed Too
2006	"You Get What You Give" (with LMC featuring Rachel McFarlane)	—	60	—	—	—	—	—	—	—	30		Non-album singles
2024	"Murder on the Dancefloor"	—	—	—	—	—	—	—	—	—	—		Non-album singles
2024	"Lost Stars"	—	—	—	—	—	—	—	—	—	—		Non-album singles
2026	"The Game of Love" (with Michelle Branch)	—	—	—	—	—	—	—	—	—	—		Everywhere and Back Again
"—" denotes releases that did not chart

=== Music videos ===
List of music videos
Year	Title	Director
1998	"You Get What You Give"	Evan Bernard
1999	"Someday We'll Know"	Lawrence Carroll
2026	"The Game of Love" (with Michelle Branch)	Stephen Kinigopoulos, Alexa Stone

=== Other appearances ===
List of non-single guest appearances, showing year released and album name
Title	Year	Album
"One Night Only (Break Lose, Break Free!)"	2026	One Night Only (Music from the Motion Picture)
