= It's Christmas All Over =

Studio album by Goo Goo Dolls
- Released: October 30, 2020
- Recorded: 2019–2020
- Studio: Studio in Boyle Heights, Los Angeles, California, United States; GCR Audio, Buffalo, New York, United States
- Genre: Christmas, pop rock
- Length: 33:24
- Label: Warner
- Producer: John Rzeznik; Brad Fernquist; Jim McGorman

Goo Goo Dolls chronology
Miracle Pill (2019)	It's Christmas All Over (2020)	Rarities (2021)

It's Christmas All Over is a 2020 Christmas album from American alternative rock band Goo Goo Dolls, released on October 30, via Warner Records. It has received mixed critical reception.

== Recording and release ==
"Someone asked me to record a Christmas song for them for a compilation record... I had so much fun doing it that I thought, 'Well, why don't we make a whole record?'"

— John Rzeznik on being inspired to record the album

The band initially planned to tour in support of 2019's Miracle Pill through mid-2020 but due to the COVID-19 pandemic, those plans were scrapped and the band members wrote music in their homes and recorded them at a studio in Boyle Heights, finalizing the work in the band's studio GCR Audio in Buffalo, New York. They made a conscious attempt to not record harder rock versions of the standards, instead opting for traditional pop sounds. In lieu of touring, the band livestreamed virtual "augmented reality movie musicals" in October and December that would allow audience members to control the camera and watch them perform.

"Let It Snow" was released for streaming, followed by "This Is Christmas" in mid-October.

In 2021, the band released a "Deluxe Digital Edition" which included two bonus tracks: "I've Got My Love To Keep Me Warm," first included as a bonus download with purchase of the CD or LP, and "One Last Song About Christmas," a new original song.

In 2023, the band released a re-edition called "It's Christmas All Over (Again) which contains one bonus track; the new original song "Who's Gonna Hear Their Wish?".

== Critical reception ==
Hal Horowitz of American Songwriter gave this album 2.5 out of five stars, criticizing it for being bland, with some muted praise for varied musical genres and experimentation, he sums up, "the project could have been much more interesting if it rocked harder and the song choices didn't revert back to some obvious, and worn out standards that find the Goo Goo Dolls doing something they never would have considered in their earliest days; playing it safe". Andy Von Pip of Under the Radar gave this album a 5.5 out of 10, noting that "the two original self-penned songs that really do hit the mark and hint at what might have been" but the work is primarily padded with "pedestrian" covers and it is ultimately a "rushed tick box exercise trying to cover all festive bases but rarely hitting a home run".

== Track listing ==
1. "Christmas All Over Again" (Tom Petty) – 4:19
2. "Shake Hands with Santa Claus" (Milton DeLugg and Bob Hillard) – 2:42
3. "This Is Christmas" (Brad Fernquist, Jim McGorman, and John Rzeznik) – 3:42
4. "Christmas Don't Be Late" (Ross Bagdasarian) – 1:58
5. "Better Days" (Rzeznik) – 3:41
6. "You Ain't Getting Nothin'" (McGorman and Rzeznik) – 2:46
7. "Let It Snow" (Sammy Cahn and Jule Styne) – 2:38
8. "Have Yourself a Merry Little Christmas" (Ralph Blane and Hugh Martin) – 3:39
9. "Hark! The Herald Angels Sing" (Felix Mendelssohn, Charles Wesley, and George Whitfield) – 2:53
10. "The Christmas Party" (Felix Bernard, Vince Guaraldi, Frank Loesser, Steve Nelson, James Lord Pierpont, Edward Pola, Walter E. Rollins, Richard B. Smith, Mel Tormé, Robert Wells, and George Wyle) – 5:06

Bonus digital download

11. "I've Got My Love to Keep Me Warm" – 2:26

2021 deluxe edition additional tracks

11. "One Last Song About Christmas" – 4:10
12. "I've Got My Love to Keep Me Warm" – 2:26

2023 deluxe edition bonus track

13. "Who's Gonna Hear Their Wish?" – 2:56

== Personnel ==
Goo Goo Dolls

- John Rzeznik – guitar, vocals, production, liner notes
- Robby Takac – bass guitar, vocals

Additional personnel

- Brad Fernquist – guitar, production
- Kudisan Kai – vocals on "I've Got My Love to Keep Me Warm"
- Craig Macintyre – drums, percussion
- John Manchaca – photography
- Jim McGorman – keyboards, piano, organ, backing vocals, horn arrangement, production
- Sydney McGorman – vocals on "Better Days"
- Ashley Osborn – photography
- Chaz Sexton – recording assistance
- Chris Shaw – engineering
- Chris Szczech – recording
- Alex Tenta – art direction, design
- The Union Square 5 – performance on "The Christmas Party"

== See also ==
- List of 2020 albums
