= Maybe You've Been Brainwashed Too =

Studio album by New Radicals
- Released: October 20, 1998
- Recorded: 1993, 1997–1998
- Genres: Alternative rock; pop; pop rock
- Length: 54:21
- Label: MCA
- Producer: Gregg Alexander

New Radicals chronology
Maybe You've Been Brainwashed Too (1998)	Maybe You've Been Brainwashed Two (2027)

Singles from Maybe You've Been Brainwashed Too
- 1. "You Get What You Give" Released: November 3, 1998; 2. "Someday We'll Know" Released: May 3, 1999

Maybe You've Been Brainwashed Too is the debut studio album by American alternative rock band New Radicals. Released on October 20, 1998, it was at the time their only album release before disbanding in 1999. The album charted in several North American and European countries, and was frontman Gregg Alexander's third album, following two unsuccessful albums released in 1989 and 1992. For the album's recording, Alexander enlisted numerous session musicians and is the only band member to perform on every song. The album's musical style was compared to numerous rock artists, including Billy Corgan, Chumbawamba, and the Rolling Stones.

The album spawned two singles. "You Get What You Give" was released as the first single off the album reaching number one in Canada and New Zealand and peaking in the top 40 in the US and the UK, among other countries. The album's second single, "Someday We'll Know", was released shortly after the group disbanded. It was far less successful than its predecessor, failing to chart on the US Billboard Hot 100.

== Background and recording ==
Prior to forming the New Radicals, lead singer Gregg Alexander released two solo albums, Michigan Rain (1989) and Intoxifornication (1992). Both albums were commercially unsuccessful, generating no charting singles and receiving mixed reviews from critics. Before forming the group, Alexander had been dropped by two record labels: A&M and Epic Records. In 1997, Alexander signed to MCA Records and allegedly received a $600,000 advance.

When recording Maybe You've Been Brainwashed Too, Alexander stated that he "completely ripped up the rules that applied to [his] first two records". While the album was credited to the New Radicals, it is often considered to be a Gregg Alexander album, as he wrote and produced most of its songs, played several instruments on it, and is the only constant member of the band. In reference to the wide variety of musicians he recruited to record the album, Alexander stated, "Most of that record was me pulling favors with studios or musicians that had played on earlier records and were like, 'Oh, Gregg's down on his luck—let's go play on his demo for the hell of it, we'll have a good laugh, have a couple of beers and maybe smoke a jay or whatever.'"

Alexander was motivated to write the album after spending time traveling the world and witnessing the extent of global suffering and injustice. He wanted to express a newfound conviction that "the American Dream is a lie for most people", but also wanted to hold onto a "certain naivete" and "celebratory tone", feeling that upbeat and romantic music was the best way to get the message across. He told The Flint Journal:

I was sick of the messages that the corporate brainwashers were sending. I want to use New Radicals to make people take a look at the system around them and think, "Am I being brainwashed, too?" ... We are being brainwashed by watching five hours of TV a day, by buying into the idea that you have to be super-skinny or that you need to have all the hip clothes. Are those the things we need, or are they just tools to stop us from paying attention to real problems, like the fact that teachers hardly make any money and we can't supply our schools with computers?

In addition to the songs included on the album, the New Radicals recorded several other songs during the recording session. Alternate mixes of tracks were released on singles: the radio edit of "You Get What You Give" is on its parent single, the instrumental cut of "Someday We'll Know" is included on some pressings of its parent single, and the radio edit of "Mother We Just Can't Get Enough" appears on its parent single (which was never officially made available for sale due to the band's split). Additionally, there were two B-sides, "To Think I Thought" and "The Decency League".

== Artwork and booklet ==
The booklet accompanying the album featured artwork in which barcodes are visible on Alexander's shoes, face and hands, and another of him appearing on a scooter in a bleached-out white silhouette. He told The Guardian: "It's a comment on pop co-opting and making irrelevant a million different images that once meant something. I'm basically saying that the only way to be free unfortunately appears to be death." Also included in the booklet are a complete set of lyrics for the title track that do not appear in the actual song, including the line, "So cynical, so hip, they told us to shut the fuck up and write another hit." When asked about this in the context of the album's release on a major level, Alexander replied: "The whole thing about independent labels, after the grunge explosion, is that multi-national companies buy them up ... You can try to live up to a non-existent Utopian ideal, or you can go straight to the people who you'd end up going through if your record was successful anyway."

== Composition and musical style ==
The lyrics and music of Maybe You've Been Brainwashed Too were compared to those of a variety of artists. The Encyclopedia of Popular Music likened the New Radicals' politically oriented lyrics to those of British punk rock band Chumbawamba. Entertainment Weekly compared the album's music to that of Hanson. The Los Angeles Times compared the New Radicals to the Rolling Stones and the Beatles. Alexander's vocal performance drew frequent comparisons to Billy Corgan of the Smashing Pumpkins, while a review by AllMusic suggested his vocals were similar to Mick Jagger's. In Consequence, critic Justin Gerber commented that the album "made Gregg Alexander the 90's answer to Phil Spector, without the bad rap of murdering people".

Many critics also compared Alexander's songwriting and vocal performance to those in earlier R&B: The Virgin Encyclopedia of Nineties Music compared "In Need of a Miracle" to "the blue-eyed soul side of Todd Rundgren", and likened "Mother We Just Can't Get Enough" to "Style Council's breezier moments", while Spin felt "Technicolor Lover" was influenced by Prince and Paul Smith. Music critic Robert Christgau also felt that Todd Rundgren, as well as Hall & Oates, were clear influences on Alexander, also comparing the lyrics to those of Bob Dylan and Meat Loaf. Q described the album as being "rooted in the stylisms of '70s FM soul and funk ... as viewed through an acidic haze".

The album's lyrics were frequently noted as being sarcastic, cynical, and occasionally memorable. "Jehovah Made This Whole Joint for You" was described as "catchy but cynical" by High Fidelity News and Record Review. Justin Gerber noted that the song discusses both religion and marijuana. "Someday We'll Know" lyrically explores numerous mysteries throughout history, including Amelia Earhart's disappearance, with the lyrics "Whatever happened to Amelia Earhart? Who holds the stars up in the sky?" The song also centers on Alexander's trying to figure out why his partner left him. "I Hope I Didn't Just Give Away the Ending" includes improvisation and only a piano and percussion for the first two minutes, and was noted in Song Means: Analysing and Interpreting Recorded Popular Song as "strangely unfocused", also noting that at the 3:18 point of the song, Alexander "steps out of character" with the lyric "This may not be true, but I said it so you'd feel involved with the song"; Spin commented that the song contains "rangy slurs".

The lyrics to the album's lead single, "You Get What You Give", drew much attention—particularly its bridge, which contained insults directed at Beck, Hanson, Courtney Love, and Marilyn Manson. Alexander stated in a 1998 Billboard interview that the song's lyrics are "mostly about remembering to fly high and be completely off your head in a world where we can't control all the elements. You have to maintain balance because you only get what you give." Spin compared the song to Sister Sledge's "Lost in Music", while Gerber noted that it is virtually expletive-free.

== Critical reception and legacy ==
Professional ratings
Review scores
Source	Rating
AllMusic	4/5 stars
Entertainment Weekly	A−
The Guardian	3/5 stars
Los Angeles Times	3/4 stars
NME	6/10
Q	4/5 stars
Rolling Stone	3.5/5 stars
Spin	6/10
Uncut	5/5 stars
The Village Voice	A−

Uncut reviewer Nigel Williamson raved that Maybe You've Been Brainwashed Too "could just be the last great American pop album before the millennium curtain brings it all crashing down." Entertainment Weekly's Tom Sinclair called the album "filler-free" and praised its positive messages. In The Village Voice, Robert Christgau praised the songwriting and lyrics, which he called "lovable" despite their "paucity of meaning". Writing for WXPN, Bruce Warren remarked that the album's lyrics, with Alexander complaining about the commercialization of Western society, media and religion, are not clichéd because they are "insightful" and truthful. Tom Cox of The Guardian found Alexander's lyrical targets predictable, but complimented his principles and "musical agility". More ambivalent was NME's Kitty Empire, who felt that the album is occasionally interesting but then "freefalls like a shot duck".

In a retrospective review for AllMusic, Alex Henderson commented that although Alexander clearly has a "left-wing point of view", the album "doesn't beat listeners over the head with a sociopolitical agenda", going on to praise the album's 1970s sound and Alexander's vocals, calling it "one of the most promising" albums released in 1998. The Encyclopedia of Popular Music called Maybe You've Been Brainwashed Too "an uplifting combination of sweeping melodies, aggressive harmonies and large dollops of stream-of-consciousness soul", likening the album to those of Chumbawamba and praising Alexander's vocal range.

In 2016, Rolling Stone ranked Maybe You've Been Brainwashed Too at number 23 on their list of "40 Greatest One-Album Wonders", reflecting that "A bubbling stew of influences that had glossier production and more pointed lyrics about corporate America than its alt-rock-radio brethren, Brainwashed could have been the beginning of a new pop order."

== Commercial performance ==
In the United States, the album debuted on the Billboard 200 at number 199 on the week of November 28, 1998. On January 16, 1999, the album rose into the top 100 on the chart for the first time, climbing 33 spots to number 79. The album reached its number 41 peak on February 13. The album remained at its peak the following week, then fell to number 51 on the Billboard 200 dated February 27. The album spent a total of 40 weeks on the chart, and placed at number 126 on the year-end Billboard 200 in 1998. It achieved Platinum status (1,000,000 copies sold) in the United States less than a year after its release.

The album also achieved some foreign success. On the UK Albums Chart, the album reached a peak of number 10. The album also charted within the top 40 in Austria, New Zealand, Germany, and Sweden, and peaked outside of the top 40 in the Netherlands and Switzerland.

The New Radicals' debut single, "You Get What You Give", was released on November 3, 1998, and was commercially successful. It reached number one in both Canada and New Zealand, and the top five in the United Kingdom. In the United States, the song peaked at number 36 on the Billboard Hot 100. The song reached the top 10 of the US Modern Rock Tracks chart, where it peaked at number eight, and also performed well on the Mainstream Top 40 and Adult Top 40 charts, peaking at numbers 14 and 11, respectively. The song also entered the top 40 in Australia, Norway, Sweden, Belgium, the Netherlands, Austria, Germany, and Chile.

"Someday We'll Know" was slated as the album's second single, but the group disbanded before its official release, and the song was far less successful than its predecessor, charting in several European countries. In the United States, the song failed to enter the Billboard Hot 100, although it did manage to reach the Adult Top 40, where it spent 11 weeks and peaked at number 28. In the United Kingdom, the song managed to enter the singles chart, but it peaked at number 48 and spent only two weeks in the top 100. "Mother We Just Can't Get Enough" was planned to be the album's third single, but was never commercially released, due to the group's dissolution.

== Track listing ==
All tracks are written by Gregg Alexander, except where noted.

No.	Title	Writer(s)	Length
1.	"Mother We Just Can't Get Enough"		5:46
2.	"You Get What You Give"	Alexander, Rick Nowels	5:00
3.	"I Hope I Didn't Just Give Away the Ending"		6:36
4.	"I Don't Wanna Die Anymore"		4:16
5.	"Jehovah Made This Whole Joint for You"		4:10
6.	"Someday We'll Know"	Alexander, Danielle Brisebois, Debra Holland	3:37
7.	"Maybe You've Been Brainwashed Too"		5:20
8.	"In Need of a Miracle"		3:43
9.	"Gotta Stay High"		3:05
10.	"Technicolor Lover"		3:43
11.	"Flowers"		3:51
12.	"Crying Like a Church on Monday"		5:02
Total length:			54:09

Japan bonus track
No.	Title	Length
13.	"To Think I Thought"	2:46
Total length:		56:55

== Personnel ==
- Gregg Alexander – vocals (all tracks), acoustic and electric guitars (all tracks); synthesizer (7), drums (10), bass guitar (10)
- Rusty Anderson – guitar (1-6, 8, 9, 11, 12)
- Josh Freese – drums (1, 3)
- John Pierce – bass (1, 2, 6, 8, 9)
- Greg Phillinganes – piano (1)
- Danielle Brisebois – background vocals (1, 4, 5, 6, 9), piano (4)
- Juliet Prater – percussion (2, 3)
- Gary Ferguson (listed as Gary Fergusson) – drums (2)
- Rick Nowels (listed as Richard Knowels) – piano (2, 3)
- Richard Podolor (listed as Richie Podler) – additional vocal arrangement (2, 3), percussion (4)
- Paul Bushnell – bass (3, 4, 5)
- Phil Parlapiano – organ (4)
- Stuart Johnson – drums (4, 5)
- Paul Gordon – piano (5, 6, 9, 11, 12)
- Tal Bergman – drums (6, 9)
- Paolo Degregorio – synthesizer (7), guitar (7), additional arrangement (7)
- Mitch Kaplan – piano (8)
- Matt Laug – drums (8, 11, 12)
- Alessandro Alessandroni – strings (11)
- Lance Morrison – bass (11)
- Amotz Plesner (listed as Amotz) – string arrangement (11)
- Michael James – electric guitar (12), mixing
- Dan Rothchild – bass (12)
- Michael Bradford – Pro Tools Engineer

== Charts ==
=== Weekly charts ===
Chart (1998–2000)	Peak position
Australian Albums (ARIA)	51
Austrian Albums (Ö3 Austria)	13
Canada Top Albums/CDs (RPM)	17
Dutch Albums (Album Top 100)	53
German Albums (Offizielle Top 100)	25
Italian Albums (Musica e Dischi)	44
New Zealand Albums (RMNZ)	34
Scottish Albums (Official Charts)	9
Swedish Albums (Sverigetopplistan)	30
Swiss Albums (Schweizer Hitparade)	41
UK Albums (Official Charts)	10
US Billboard 200	41

=== Year-end charts ===
Chart (1999)	Position
US Billboard 200	126

== Certifications ==
Region	Certification	Certified units/sales
Canada (Music Canada)	Gold	50,000^{^}
New Zealand (RMNZ)	Gold	7,500^{‡}
United Kingdom (BPI)	Gold	100,000^{^}
United States (RIAA)	Platinum	1,000,000^{^}
^{^} Shipments figures based on certification alone.^{‡} Sales+streaming figures based on certification alone.
