= Rarities (Goo Goo Dolls album) =

Compilation album by Goo Goo Dolls
- Released: June 25, 2021
- Genre: Alternative rock
- Label: Warner

Goo Goo Dolls chronology
It's Christmas All Over (2020)	Rarities (2021)	Chaos in Bloom (2022)

Rarities is a double compilation released by the band Goo Goo Dolls on June 25, 2021. The album features a total of 20 rare and unheard songs spanning from 1995 to 2007. Tracks include B-sides, live performances, radio performances, and acoustic renditions.

== Reception ==
Emma Harrison from Clash gave the album a 7 out of 10, calling it "a toe-tapping panoramic view of Goo Goo Dolls’ body of work".

== Track listing ==
No.	Title	Length
1.	"Hit or Miss"	2:43
2.	"Nothing Can Change You"	3:12
3.	"Long Way Down" (Chris Lord-Alge remix)	3:29
4.	"Name" (live acoustic)	3:53
5.	"Don't Change" (live)	3:47
6.	"Girl Right Next to Me" (live acoustic)	3:33
7.	"Another Second Time Around" (live acoustic)	2:53
8.	"Iris" (acoustic)	3:25
9.	"Slide" (acoustic)	3:15
10.	"Naked" (remix)	4:07
11.	"Black Balloon" (live)	3:42
12.	"Naked" (live)	3:55
13.	"Black Balloon" (live from Sessions@AOL)	4:01
14.	"Broadway" (live from Sessions@AOL)	3:51
15.	"We'll Be Here (When You're Gone)" (acoustic)	3:18
16.	"Better Days" (acoustic)	3:31
17.	"Let Love In" (live)	4:45
18.	"Listen" (live)	3:06
19.	"Feel the Silence" (live)	3:51
20.	"Take Me Out to the Ball Game"	0:56

== Charts ==
Chart (2021)	Peak position
Hungarian Albums (MAHASZ)	27
