= Crush (Mandy Moore song) =

2001 single by Mandy Moore

Single by Mandy Moore

from the album Mandy Moore
- B-side: "In My Pocket" (Brandnew remix)
- Released: September 17, 2001
- Genre: Teen pop
- Length: 3:43
- Label: Epic
- Songwriters: Kenny Gioia; Shep Goodman
- Producers: Kenny Gioia; Shep Goodman

Mandy Moore singles chronology
"In My Pocket" (2001)	"Crush" (2001)	"Cry" (2001)

Music video
- "Crush" on YouTube

"Crush" is a song by American singer and actress Mandy Moore from her second studio album, Mandy Moore (2001). It was the album's second single, following "In My Pocket". Released in September 2001, it peaked at number 35 on the US Billboard Mainstream Top 40 chart and at number 25 in Australia.

== Commercial performance ==
In the United States, "Crush" did not enter the Billboard Hot 100 but appeared on the Billboard Mainstream Top 40 chart, debuting at number 35 and spending five weeks on the chart. In Australia, "Crush" debuted and peaked at number 25 on the ARIA Singles Chart, becoming Mandy Moore's fifth single to enter the chart. It left the chart from number 49, spending a total of seven weeks in the top 50.

== Music video ==
The song's music video, directed by Chris Applebaum, features Moore singing with her band in an apartment. Then, it switches to different places where Moore is, including a bedroom, a purple room, a jungle-themed living room and a bathtub where Moore submerges. The video ends with Moore wearing a replica of the jacket Michael Jackson wears in the "Thriller" music video.

== Track listing ==
The album mix-tape consist of album tracks "Turn the Clock Around", "Cry", "Saturate Me", and "When I Talk to You".

Australian CD single

1. "Crush" (remix)
2. "Crush" (album version)
3. "In My Pocket" (Brandnew remix)
4. Album mix-tape

== Charts ==
Chart (2001)	Peak position
Australia (ARIA)	25
US Pop Airplay (Billboard)	35
