= In My Pocket =

2001 single by Mandy Moore

Single by Mandy Moore

from the album Mandy Moore
- Released: May 1, 2001
- Genre: Teen pop
- Length: 3:39
- Label: Epic
- Songwriters: Randall Barlow; Emilio Estefan; Liza Quintana; Gian Marco Zignago
- Producers: Emilio Estefan; Randall Barlow

Mandy Moore singles chronology
"So Real" (2000)	"In My Pocket" (2001)	"Crush" (2001)

Music video
- "In My Pocket" on YouTube

"In My Pocket" is a song by American singer Mandy Moore for her 2001 self-titled second studio album as its opening track. It was released on May 1, 2001, by Epic Records as the lead single from the record. The song was written by Randall Barlow, Emilio Estefan, Liza Quintana, and Gian Marco Zignago and produced by Estefan and Barlow. Emilio Estefan re-released the song as "Pennies in My Pocket" for the Miami Vice feature film in 2006.

Opening to mixed reviews from music critics, "In My Pocket" instantly entered the top 30 in Australia and New Zealand. In the United States, the single failed to chart on the Billboard Hot 100, peaking at number two on the Bubbling Under Hot 100 Singles chart.

== Critical reception ==
"In My Pocket" received mixed reviews from music critics. Slant Magazine's Sal Cinquemani gave the song a positive review, favoring its departure from Mandy Moore's previous singles and calling it "home to one of the best pop hooks in recent memory" and stating that the lyrics were "far more penetrating than anything on her peers' plates." Entertainment Weekly's Matt Diehl, however, gave it a C rating, stating his disturbance at "hearing the 17-year-old moaning, 'How much for your love?'" Diehl was also unhappy with its lyrical content, relating that "lyrics that dance around naughtiness... devolve into nonsense." People Magazine said that it was "laced with sinewy Middle Eastern rhythms... just as right for the summer."

== Chart performance ==
"In My Pocket" charted on the US Billboard Bubbling Under Hot 100 Singles chart, peaking at number two. The entered the top 20 in Australia, where it reached number 11.

== Music video ==
Total Request Live premiered the song's music video on April 20, 2001.

== Track listings ==
European CD1

1. "In My Pocket" (album version) – 3:38
2. "In My Pocket" (Brandnew radio mix) – 3:28

European CD2

1. "In My Pocket" (album version) – 3:38
2. "In My Pocket" (Brandnew radio mix) – 3:28
3. "In My Pocket" (Hex Hector main 7-inch mix) – 3:21
4. "In My Pocket" (Thunderpuss club mix—vox up) – 9:53
5. "In My Pocket" (video version)

Australian CD single

1. "In My Pocket" (album version) – 3:38
2. "I Wanna Be with You" (live on MTV) – 3:28
3. "In My Pocket" (Hex Hector main 7-inch mix) – 3:21
4. "In My Pocket" (Thunderpuss club mix—vox up) – 9:53

Japanese CD single

1. "In My Pocket" (album version)
2. "In My Pocket" (Hex Hector main 7-inch mix)
3. "In My Pocket" (Thunderpuss radio mix)
4. "I Wanna Be with You" (acoustic)

== Charts ==
=== Weekly charts ===
Chart (2001)	Peak position
Australia (ARIA)	11
New Zealand (Recorded Music NZ)	26
US Bubbling Under Hot 100 (Billboard)	2
US Pop Airplay (Billboard)	21
US Top 40 Tracks (Billboard)	37

=== Year end charts ===
Chart (2001)	Position
Australia (ARIA)	75

== Certifications ==
Region	Certification	Certified units/sales
Australia (ARIA)	Gold	35,000^{^}
^{^} Shipments figures based on certification alone.

== Release history ==
Region	Date	Format	Label	Ref.
United States	May 1, 2001	Contemporary hit radio	Epic	
Australia	June 4, 2001	CD	Epic	
Japan	June 13, 2001	CD	Epic	
