= Tobin Armbrust =

American film producer (born 1971)

- Born: 1971 (age 54–55)
- Education: University of California, Santa Barbara
- Occupation: Film producer

Tobin A. Armbrust (born 1971) is an American film producer who works for Exclusive Media, a film production and distribution company. The films he has produced include Firewall (2006), Let Me In (2010), The Woman in Black (2012), End of Watch (2012), Rush (2013), Begin Again (2013), and Dark Places (2014).

== Career ==
After completing a bachelor's degree in political science at the University of California, Santa Barbara, Armbrust entered the film industry by working as a head of acquisitions at several distribution companies, including the French Canal+ Group and the Japanese Pony Canyon.

He then worked at Intermedia for seven years as Vice President of business development and production; he was also a producer for Warner Bros., where he oversaw the development of over 30 films and served as a co-producer of the 2006 thriller film Firewall. He also ran Thunder Road Pictures with Basil Iwanyk until March 2006, when Spitfire Pictures hired him as a co-head of production.

In 2008, he joined Exclusive Media, a British film production and distribution company founded the same year by Guy East and Nigel Sinclair, with whom Armbrust had worked at Intermedia. The first films whose production he oversaw at Exclusive Media were The Woman in Black and End of Watch, both of which were released in 2012 to financial success, followed by the 2013 releases, Parkland and Rush, which performed poorly at the North American box office.

As a producer of Let Me In (2010), he and the film's other producers received a nomination for Best Feature at the Gotham Independent Film Awards.

With Exclusive Media, he produced Begin Again (2013), The Quiet Ones (2014), A Walk Among the Tombstones (2014), and Dark Places (2014). As of 2014, Armbrust serves as the Exclusive Media's President of Worldwide Production and Acquisitions.

== Personal life ==
Armbrust is married with two children, and lives and works in Beverly Hills, California.
