= You Get What You Give (song) =

1998 single by New Radicals

Single by New Radicals

from the album Maybe You've Been Brainwashed Too
- B-side: "To Think I Thought"; "Maybe You've Been Brainwashed Too"
- Released: November 3, 1998
- Genre: Alternative rock; power pop; pop rock
- Length: 5:00 (LP version); 4:42 (single version)
- Label: MCA
- Songwriters: Gregg Alexander; Rick Nowels
- Producer: Gregg Alexander

New Radicals singles chronology
"You Get What You Give" (1998)	"Someday We'll Know" (1999)

Music video
- "You Get What You Give" on YouTube

"You Get What You Give" is a song by American alternative rock band New Radicals. It was the first and most successful single from their first studio album, Maybe You've Been Brainwashed Too (1998). Released on November 3, 1998, the song reached number 36 on the US Billboard Hot 100 and number eight on the Billboard Modern Rock Tracks chart. Outside the US, it reached number five in the United Kingdom, number four in Ireland, and number one in Canada and New Zealand.

== Composition ==
"You Get What You Give" has been described as an alternative rock, power pop, and pop rock song. It is written in the key of D major with a moderate tempo of 120 beats per minute. Gregg Alexander said the central theme of the song was "remembering to fly high and be completely off your head in a world where you can't control all elements". Alexander wrote the song after having a dream in which he heard music coming from a house and walked in to find Joni Mitchell, who told him, "Have a seat." Mitchell would later, in real life, go on to praise the song as one of her favourites.

Much of the media attention that "You Get What You Give" received centered on the closing lyrics:

Health insurance, rip-off lying
FDA, big bankers buying
Fake computer crashes dining
Cloning while they're multiplying
Fashion shoots with Beck and Hanson,
Courtney Love and Marilyn Manson
You're all fakes, run to your mansions
Come around, we'll kick your ass in.

Alexander wrote this section for the song as a test to see whether the media would focus on the important political issues of the first few lines or the petty celebrity-dissing. As suspected, a considerable amount of press began to appear about the name-dropping, and the other political issues were largely ignored.

Marilyn Manson commented that he was "not mad he said he'd kick my ass, I just don't want to be used in the same sentence with Courtney Love... I'll crack his [Alexander's] skull open if I see him." Beck reported that Alexander personally apologized for the line when they met each other by chance in a supermarket, claiming that it was never meant to be personal. Alexander collaborated with Hanson, whose drummer, Zac Hanson, called him "a bit of a character, but a cool guy."

Although the lines were used for the band's Top of the Pops appearance, it was truncated at "kick you".

== Critical reception ==
Larry Flick from Billboard gave a mixed review of the song, saying that it was a "chugging, Wham!-style pop song with slightly cheesy lyrics", but that the ending lyrics were "interesting". Daily Record wrote, "This anthem sounds like The Waterboys at their best and has meaningful lyrics." They also added, "It may sound like Bruce Springsteen, but that's no bad thing. This upbeat anthem will be played in all the good bars of the land." A reviewer from The Mirror called it a "gold nugget of a single".

In the liner notes to her 2004 compilation Artist's Choice, the Canadian songwriter Joni Mitchell praised "You Get What You Give" for "rising from the swamp of 'McMusic' like a flower of hope". In 2006, Ice-T was asked on Late Night with Conan O'Brien about what he has heard, besides rap music, in the last few years that really grabbed him and his only reply was "You Get What You Give". In a Time interview, U2 lead guitarist the Edge is quoted saying "You Get What You Give" is the song he is "most jealous of. I really would love to have written that."

== Music video ==
The accompanying music video for "You Get What You Give" was filmed in the Staten Island Mall in New York and directed by Evan Bernard. The New Radicals' frontman Gregg Alexander said he chose this setting because he sees the shopping mall as a metaphor for society—a fake, controlled environment engineered to encourage spending. The video showed a group of teenagers, led by Alexander, going through the mall wreaking havoc—tossing nets on security guards, placing businessmen in animal cages, knocking over merchandise, hijacking Lambrettas, and moshing in the food court.

== Impact and legacy ==
In 2002, VH1 voted it as the 64th greatest one-hit wonder of all time. In 2007, the song was voted number 90 on VH1's "100 Greatest Songs of the 90s". It was listed number 440 on Blender's list of "The 500 Greatest Songs Since You Were Born". In 2010 it was number 106 on Pitchfork's "Top 200 Tracks of the 90s". In 2011, VH1 ranked it as 11th on "40 Greatest One-Hit Wonders of the 90s". Annie Zaleski for The A.V. Club wrote that the song was "surprisingly influential on popular music, just in a non-obvious, almost obscured way", and that it was "both a nostalgic artifact and a song that transcends any era". BBC Radio ranked the song at number 38 on its list of the "Most Heard Recordings in Britain of the Last 75 Years".

During the 2020 presidential campaign, the song was used as the walk-on theme for Kamala Harris' husband Doug Emhoff. On January 20, 2021, New Radicals reunited for the first time in 22 years to perform the song during an inauguration performance on the day Joe Biden was sworn in as president. The song was a favorite of President Biden's son Beau Biden, who died in 2015. At his funeral, his sister Ashley recited the lyrics in her eulogy. The band had rejected offers to perform over the past 22 years but wanted to honor this day and honor Beau Biden, who was a military veteran. The band's Gregg Alexander said prior to their performance, "We pledged if Joe [Biden] won, we'd get together and play our little song both in memory and in honor of our new president's patriot son Beau and also with the prayer of Joe being able to bring our country together again with compassion, honesty and justice for a change".

=== Accolades ===
Publication	Accolade	Rank
VH1	100 Greatest One-Hit Wonders	64
VH1	40 Greatest One-Hit Wonders of the '90s	11
Blender	500 Greatest Songs Since You Were Born	440
Pitchfork	Top 250 Tracks of the 1990s	205
Rolling Stone	50 Best Songs of the Nineties	37

== Track listings ==
- UK CD single
1. "You Get What You Give" – 4:42
2. "To Think I Thought" – 2:46
3. "Maybe You've Been Brainwashed Too" – 5:21
- UK cassette single
1. "You Get What You Give" – 4:42
2. "Maybe You've Been Brainwashed Too" – 5:21
- European CD single
1. "You Get What You Give" – 4:42
2. "To Think I Thought" – 2:46
- Australian CD single
1. "You Get What You Give" – 4:42
2. "To Think I Thought" – 2:46
3. "Maybe You've Been Brainwashed Too" – 5:21
4. "You Get What You Give" (album version) – 5:02
- Japanese CD single
1. "You Get What You Give" – 4:08
2. "You Get What You Give" (album version) – 5:00
3. "Maybe You've Been Brainwashed Too" (album version) – 5:20

== Personnel ==
- Gregg Alexander – lead vocals, guitar
- Rusty Anderson – guitar
- John Pierce – bass guitar
- Rick Nowels – piano, backing vocals
- Gary Ferguson – drums
- Juliet Prater – percussion
- Richie Podler – additional vocal arrangement
- Michael Brauer – mixing

== Charts ==
=== Weekly charts ===
Weekly chart performance for "You Get What You Give"
Chart (1998–1999)	Peak position
Australia (ARIA)	13
Austria (Ö3 Austria Top 40)	33
Belgium (Ultratop 50 Flanders)	42
Belgium (Ultratop 50 Wallonia)	36
Canada Top Singles (RPM)	1
Canada Adult Contemporary (RPM)	17
Denmark (IFPI)	20
Europe (Eurochart Hot 100)	16
France (SNEP)	57
Germany (GfK)	21
Iceland (Íslenski Listinn Topp 40)	29
Ireland (IRMA)	4
Italy (Musica e dischi)	14
Italy Airplay (Music & Media)	2
Netherlands (Dutch Top 40)	19
Netherlands (Single Top 100)	22
New Zealand (Recorded Music NZ)	1
Norway (VG-lista)	15
Scottish Singles Sales (Official Charts)	5
Spain (Promusicae)	6
Sweden (Sverigetopplistan)	27
Switzerland (Schweizer Hitparade)	18
UK Singles (Official Charts)	5
US Billboard Hot 100	36
US Adult Alternative Airplay (Billboard)	1
US Adult Pop Airplay (Billboard)	11
US Alternative Airplay (Billboard)	8
US Pop Airplay (Billboard)	14

=== Year-end charts ===
Year-end chart performance for "You Get What You Give"
Chart (1999)	Position
Australia (ARIA)	73
Brazil (Crowley)	80
Canada Top Singles (RPM)	28
Canada Adult Contemporary (RPM)	98
Italy (Musica e dischi)	95
Netherlands (Dutch Top 40)	133
UK Singles (OCC)	40
UK Airplay (Music Week)	4
US Adult Top 40 (Billboard)	26
US Mainstream Top 40 (Billboard)	57
US Modern Rock Tracks (Billboard)	36
US Triple-A (Billboard)	1

== Certifications ==
Certifications and sales for "You Get What You Give"
Region	Certification	Certified units/sales
Denmark (IFPI Danmark)	Gold	45,000^{‡}
Italy (FIMI)	Gold	50,000^{‡}
New Zealand (RMNZ)	4× Platinum	120,000^{‡}
United Kingdom (BPI)	2× Platinum	1,200,000^{‡}
^{‡} Sales+streaming figures based on certification alone.

== Release history ==
Release dates and formats for "You Get What You Give"
Region	Date	Format(s)	Label(s)	Ref.
United States	November 3, 1998	Contemporary hit radio	MCA	
Japan	December 19, 1998	CD	MCA	
United Kingdom	March 22, 1999	CD	MCA	
Europe	April 19, 1999	CD	MCA	

== Cover versions ==
In 2015, the Maine released a cover version on the album Covers. In 2017, Felix Cartal released a cover version (entitled "Get What You Give") for his album Next Season, which received two nominations at the 2018 Juno Awards for Producer of the Year and Dance Recording of the Year.
