= Paul Gordon (musician) =

American songwriter

- Paul Gordon

Background information
- Born: October 19, 1963; Everett, Massachusetts, U.S.
- Died: February 18, 2016 (aged 52) Nashville, Tennessee, U.S.
- Occupation: Musician
- Instruments: Keyboards; guitar
- Years active: 1990s–2016
- Formerly of: Natasha Bedingfield, Goo Goo Dolls, The B-52's, Danielle Brisebois, New Radicals, Prince, Jennifer Nettles, Lisa Marie Presley, Charles & Eddie, The Devlins, Eran DD, Jeffrey Gaines, John Gregory, Shari Hall, Nona Hendryx, Carly Hennessy, The Juliet Dagger, Jill Jones, Chaka Khan, Lila McCann, Mandy Moore, Jenni Muldaur, Trine Rein, Wild Orchid and David Yazbek

Paul Christian Gordon (October 19, 1963 – February 18, 2016) was an American musician, composer, and producer. A keyboardist and guitarist, he was a member of New Radicals and the touring keyboardist and rhythm guitarist for the B-52's from 2007 until his death in 2016.

== Early life ==
Paul Christian Gordon was born on October 19, 1963, in Everett, Massachusetts, to Rev. Calvin Paul Gordon and Barbara (Landry) Gordon. In 1966, the family relocated to Newport, Rhode Island, where Rev. Gordon pastored the Evangelical Friends Church. Paul Gordon graduated from Rogers High School in 1981.

== Career ==
Gordon worked with Natasha Bedingfield, Goo Goo Dolls, The B-52's, Danielle Brisebois, New Radicals, Prince, Jennifer Nettles, Lisa Marie Presley, Charles & Eddie, The Devlins, Eran DD, Jeffrey Gaines, John Gregory, Nona Hendryx, Carly Hennessy, The Juliet Dagger, Jill Jones, Chaka Khan, Lila McCann, Mandy Moore, Jenni Muldaur, Trine Rein, Wild Orchid and David Yazbek.

Gordon also composed music for both television and film soundtracks. His clients included The Fox Network, ABC Family and Spike TV. Some of the compositions he wrote or co-wrote include the themes for Digimon, Transformers: Robots in Disguise, Power Rangers Wild Force, the Great Pretenders and Stripperella.

== Personal life ==
Gordon was married to Jennifer (Lysak) Gordon. They had two sons.

== Death ==
On February 18, 2016, Gordon died in Nashville, Tennessee, at age 52, from complications of heart disease.
