= Gregg Alexander =

American singer-songwriter and producer (born 1970)

- Also known as: Alex Ander; Cessyl Orchestra
- Born: Gregory Aiuto; May 4, 1970 (age 56); Grosse Pointe, Michigan, U.S.
- Genres: Alternative rock; power pop
- Occupations: Singer; songwriter; producer; musician
- Instruments: Vocals; guitar; keyboards; drums; bass
- Years active: 1989–present
- Labels: A&M; Epic; MCA; EMI; Warner Chappell; ALXNDR; Flatiron Recordings
- Formerly of: The Circus; New Radicals

Gregg Alexander (born Gregory Aiuto; May 4, 1970) is an American singer, songwriter, and record producer. He is the lead vocalist and guitarist for the alternative rock band New Radicals.

After the release of their only album, Maybe You've Been Brainwashed Too (1998), the group disbanded and Alexander shifted focus onto production and songwriting work for other artists. Since then, he has been credited on the singles "Life Is a Rollercoaster" and "Lovin' Each Day" by Ronan Keating, "Inner Smile" by Texas, "Murder on the Dancefloor" and "Mixed Up World" by Sophie Ellis-Bextor, all of which were commercial successes in the early 2000s.

Alexander won a Grammy Award for his contributions to the 2003 single "The Game of Love" by Santana. He also co-wrote songs for the film Begin Again, including "Lost Stars", which was nominated for an Academy Award for Best Original Song.

== Early life ==
Born in Grosse Pointe, Michigan, Alexander was raised in a conservative Jehovah's Witness household. He received his first guitar at age 12 and taught himself to play several instruments. He and his sister, Caroline, played piano and Gregg composed songs.

== Career ==
=== Early career ===
At age 14, he joined a band, The Circus, with his older brother, Stephen Aiuto, and classmates George Snow and John Mabarak. In 1984, they played their high school's battle of the bands, a competition that also included John Lowery (later known as John 5). At age 16, Alexander signed his first recording contract with A&M Records after playing his demo tapes for producer Rick Nowels. He released his debut album, Michigan Rain, in 1989 at age 19, to little notice. In 1992, he signed to Epic Records and released Intoxifornication, consisting largely of re-released songs from Michigan Rain, and was again ignored.

=== New Radicals (1997–1999) ===
In 1997, Alexander formed New Radicals, a revolving-door band with no permanent members other than Alexander and his long-term collaborator Danielle Brisebois. In October 1998, they released the album Maybe You've Been Brainwashed Too, which sold more than one million copies. The single "You Get What You Give" was released that autumn and was an international hit. It was not long after New Radicals' success that Alexander became tired of the constant media attention and an exhausting touring schedule. In July 1999, "Someday We'll Know" was announced as the band's second single; several days later, Alexander announced he was disbanding New Radicals to focus on production work. On January 20, 2021, New Radicals reunited for a one-off performance of "You Get What You Give" on inauguration day for President Joe Biden. Used as a rally song at Biden campaign events, the song was a favorite of Joe's son Beau Biden, who died in 2015. The song's lyrics were recited by his sister Ashley during the eulogy at his funeral.

The band had rejected offers to perform over the preceding 22 years, but wanted to honor this day and honor Beau, a military veteran. Prior to their performance on inauguration day, Alexander said: "We pledged if Joe [Biden] won, we'd get together and play our little song both in memory and in honor of our new president's patriot son Beau and also with the prayer of Joe being able to bring our country together again with compassion, honesty and justice for a change."

=== Songwriting and production (1999–present) ===
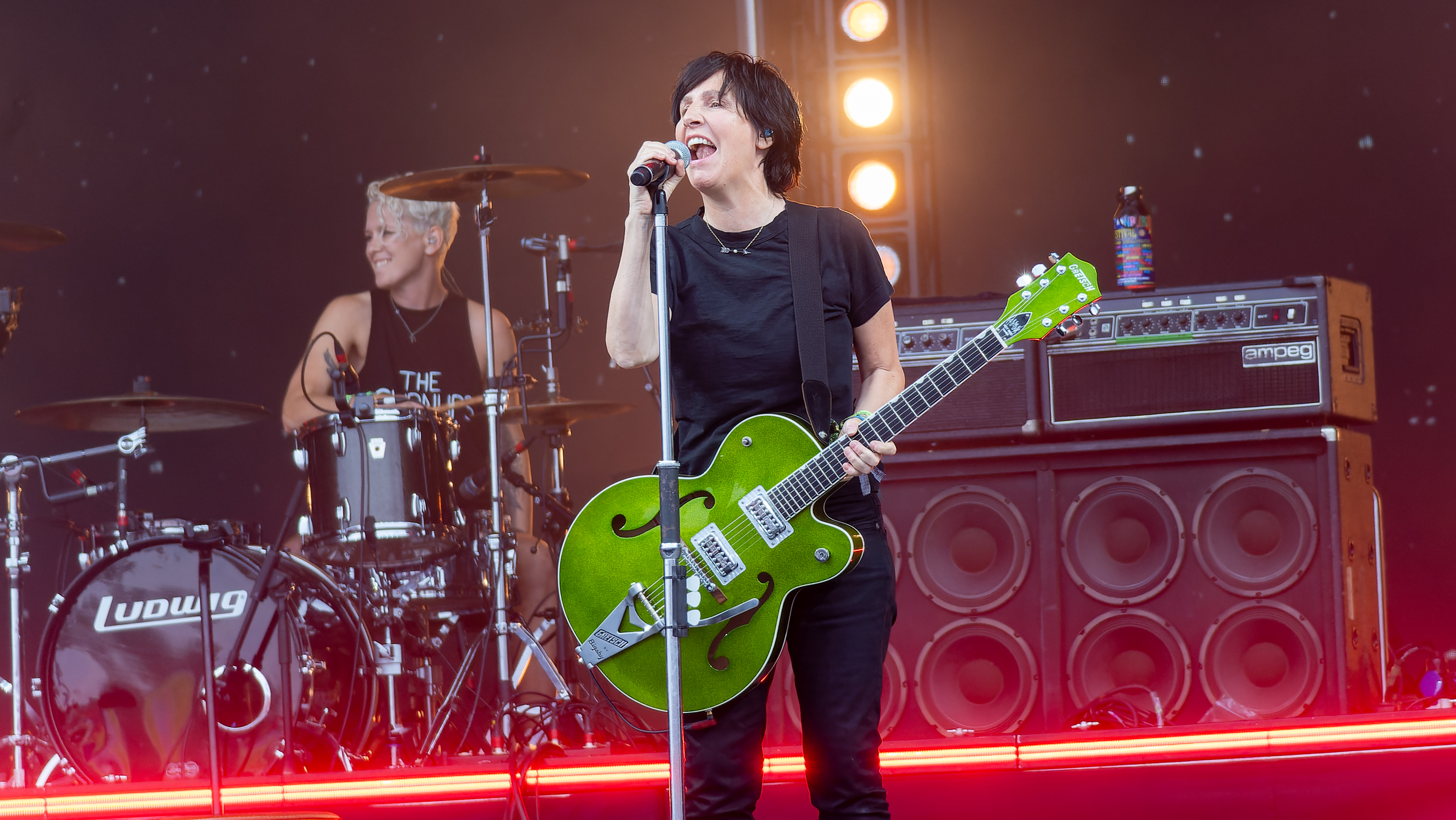
Alexander's song "Inner Smile" was a 2001 commercial success for Scottish band Texas (pictured in 2023)

Since the summer of 1999, Alexander has written and produced hit songs for several artists, including Brisebois, Enrique Iglesias, Texas, Geri Halliwell, S Club 7, Melanie C, Rod Stewart, Hanson, Sophie Ellis-Bextor, Mónica Naranjo, and Ronan Keating (he co-produced and co-wrote the album Destination). Alexander's composition "The Game of Love", recorded by Santana and Michelle Branch, earned him a Best Pop Collaboration prize at the 45th Annual Grammy Awards. AllMusic's Stephen Thomas Erlewine described Alexander as "the catchiest, smartest professional mainstream pop songwriter of the early 2000s".

In 2003, he wrote four songs on Iglesias' album 7, under the pseudonym Alex Ander. In 2004, a new Alexander track, "A Love Like That", was released, uncredited, on the Internet. It was suspected to be a New Radicals outtake, as some of the lyrics appeared in the booklet accompanying Maybe You've Been Brainwashed Too. Also in 2004, Hanson released "Lost Without Each Other", co-written by Alexander, on their album Underneath. "Why Can't We Make Things Work", written by Alexander (and Rick Nowels), was released by Any Dream Will Do winner Lee Mead on his self-titled album in November 2007. In 2010, Boyzone released the single "Love Is a Hurricane", written by Alexander and Brisebois.

Alexander co-wrote and co-produced the music for the musical romance film Begin Again, along with his longtime collaborators Brisebois and Nowels, as well as Nick Lashley. Their song "Lost Stars" was nominated for an Best Original Song at the 2015 Academy Awards. On the soundtrack album, Alexander, Brisebois, Nowels and Lashley are credited under the name Cessyl Orchestra.

On November 4, 2014, Alexander appeared and performed publicly for the first time in 15 years at the Hollywood Music in Media Awards, singing "Lost Stars". Since 2018, Alexander has been involved in writing sessions with Phil Thornalley and his 1970s singer-songwriter inspired music project, Astral Drive. Two songs co-written by Alexander have been released: "Take Back the World" and "This Is the Place". Alexander assisted with production of The Struts' album Everybody Wants and co-wrote two songs: "The Ol' Switcheroo" and "Put Your Money on Me". He also co-wrote and provided backup vocals for Spencer Ludwig's 2016 single, "Right Into U"; and co-wrote (with Lashley and Nowels) the Kaiser Chiefs' 2019 song "The Only Ones".

In January 2024, Sophie Ellis-Bextor's "Murder on the Dancefloor", co-written by Alexander, became a viral hit due to its appearance in the film Saltburn. The resurgence of the song also carried over to social network TikTok, which expanded the song's popularity. It climbed to No. 2 on the UK singles chart, and reached No. 51 on the US Billboard Hot 100 singles chart. This became the biggest hit for Alexander's career since "The Game of Love" in 2003.

== Discography ==
=== Albums ===
- Michigan Rain (1989)
- Intoxifornication (1992)

=== Singles ===
- "In the Neighborhood" (1989)
- "Smokin' in Bed" (1992)
- "The Truth" (1992)

=== Others ===
- "Promise Tomorrow Tonight" (1994, duet with Danielle Brisebois on her album Arrive All over You)
- "A Love Like That" (2003, digital download)
