= Jim McGorman =

American singer

- Born: James McGorman; 1974 (age 51–52)
- Origin: Philadelphia, Pennsylvania, United States
- Genres: Rock
- Occupations: Musician, songwriter, producer, multi-instrumentalist
- Instruments: Guitar, keyboards, drums, vocals
- Website: www.jimmcgorman.com

James McGorman (born c. 1974) is an American guitarist keyboardist and record producer from Philadelphia, Pennsylvania. He is a touring musician (keyboard player and backing vocalist) for the American alternative rock band Goo Goo Dolls, which he joined in 2018, and previously served a similar role in the band New Radicals. McGorman is also known for his work with the House Band on the CBS television shows Rockstar: INXS and Rockstar: Supernova. McGorman has written and produced songs and recorded on albums for the band as well. He has worked with Diana Herrera on her first extended play, Blueprint (2026).

== Early life ==
McGorman grew up in Cherry Hill, New Jersey. He graduated Cherry Hill High School East, 1992; he also graduated Berklee College of Music in 1995 with a degree in audio engineering and music production.

== Career ==
He has been musical director for Avril Lavigne, Weezer, Michelle Branch, Paul Stanley (from Kiss) and toured with Cher. With Cher on her Farewell Tour, McGorman played guitars, keyboards and sang a duet with Cher. He has also worked with Gwen Stefani, Shakira, The Corrs, Aaron Neville, New Radicals, Poison, Goo Goo Dolls and Marc Broussard. He has written songs for Goo Goo Dolls, Sabrina Carpenter, Kate Voegele, Bret Michaels (Poison), Marc Broussard and for TV shows such as One Tree Hill and Smallville.

TV performances include Saturday Night Live, The Tonight Show, BBC's Top of the Pops, "American Music Awards", "Vancouver 2010 Olympics Closing Ceremonies", Conan O'Brien, Regis and Kelly, The View, and MTV's TRL. Jim performed with Michelle Branch on the TV series Buffy the Vampire Slayer (episode: Tabula Rasa) and with Dilana Robichaux (the runner-up from Rock Star: Supernova) on The Ellen DeGeneres Show. In October/November 2006, Jim and the House Band toured the United States with Paul Stanley (from Kiss). In January 2007, Jim became a member of Avril Lavigne's band and toured with her from 2007 to 2013. In 2019, he toured with Goo Goo Dolls.

Regarding the Rockstar TV show house band, he says that he feels his role is a multifaceted one: guitar, keys and singing.

== Musical influences ==
McGorman cites a number of popular music influences, including soul music of Gamble and Huff, and the rock of Coldplay and U2.

== Discography ==
Jim McGorman discography
| Year | Album | Artist | Credit |
|---|---|---|---|
| 1997 | To Make Me Who I Am | Aaron Neville | Guitar |
| 2001 | Transmatic | Transmatic | Strings |
| 2002 | Leap of Faith | David Charvet | Vocals (background), Associated Performer |
| 2003 | Chapter 2 | Jessica Jacobs | Bass, Guitar, Piano, Vocals (background), Producer |
| 2004 | Borrowed Heaven | The Corrs | Piano, Musician |
| 2004 | Carencro | Marc Broussard | Organ, Piano, Vocals (background), Fender Rhodes, Wurlitzer |
| 2005 | Rock Star: A Night at the Mayan | Various Artists | Guitar, Keyboards, Vocals |
| 2005 | Rock Star: INXS (DVD) | Various Artists | Guitar, Keyboards, Vocals |
| 2005 | Safe in Sound | Jim Boggia | Piano, Tack Piano |
| 2005 | Unfabulous and More | Emma Roberts | Keyboards, Group Member |
| 2005 | Something To Fall Back On | Sam Jaffe | Guitars, Keyboards |
| 2006 | Reach | Warren Barfield | Piano, Guitar (Electric), Organ (Hammond), Vocals (background), Clavinet, Wurlitzer, Tack Piano |
| 2006 | Dark Horse | Ryan Star | Guitar, Vocals (background) |
| 2006 | The World is Falling Down | Jamestown Ltd. | Vocals, Piano, Keyboards, Guitars, Bass, Producer |
| 2007 | Poison'd | Poison | Keyboards, Vocals (background) |
| 2007 | The Best Damn Thing | Avril Lavigne | Rhythm Guitar, Vocals (background) |
| 2011 | Do The Best with What I Got | Greg Lato | Producer, Songwriting, Guitarist, Keyboards, Bass, Vocals (background) |
| 2019 | Miracle Pill | Goo Goo Dolls | Background Vocals |
| 2020 | Shipwreck | Laura Michelle | Composer |
| 2020 | It's Christmas All Over | Goo Goo Dolls | Producer, Keyboards, Backing Vocals, Horns Arranger, Writer |
| 2022 | Change in the Weather | Mama Said | Producer |
| 2025 | All The Rest | Fields of Jake | Producer, Composer |
