= Intoxifornication =

Studio album by Gregg Alexander
- Released: May 5, 1992
- Recorded: Los Angeles, California at Sunset Sound, Westlake Audio, American Recorders, The Music Grinder, Gregg's bedroom, and the Suicide Room
- Genres: Pop rock; funk rock
- Length: 45:15
- Label: Epic
- Producers: Gregg Alexander; Rick Nowels

Gregg Alexander chronology
Michigan Rain (1989)	Intoxifornication (1992)

Professional ratings
Review scores
Source	Rating
Allmusic	3/5 stars

Intoxifornication is the second album by Gregg Alexander, released on May 5, 1992.

It includes three tracks ("Loving You Sets Me Free", "Cruel with Me" and "The World We Love So Much") that had already been released on Alexander's 1989 debut album Michigan Rain. It also includes rerecordings of "Michigan Rain" and "Save Me from Myself" from that album.

Both "Smokin' in Bed" and "The Truth" were released as one-track promotional singles, and had videos filmed.

"The Truth" includes the line "Here it comes, here it comes, here it comes/Are you ready?/Here comes the lawsuit, baby", followed by Alexander covering the refrain of "Slow Ride" by Foghat. There is also a reference to the "Tutti Frutti" line "A wop-bom a loo-mop".

In the leadup to the album's release in May 1992, personal ads were placed in the LA Weekly that simply read "INTOXIFORNICATION".

== Critical reception ==
In a contemporaneous review, David Barton of The Sacramento Bee compared the sound of Intoxifornication to a hybrid of Prince and Bryan Adams, calling it "sexy, funny, catchy and musically challenging without being obscure... Intoxifornication not only announces a talent to watch, but one to get into right now". Brenda Herrmann of the Chicago Tribune also compared Alexander to Prince "with a twist of Beverly Hills 90210", praising Alexander's "musky, moany voice... gorgeous face, guitar and songs filled with sexual by-plays... made for radio and pretty kind on the ear, if not revolutionary". A later negative take came from William Ruhlmann of AllMusic, who called the album "overwrought hard guitar rock of no distinction".

== Track listing ==
All songs written by Gregg Alexander.

1. "Smokin' in Bed" – 3:11
2. "Michigan Rain" – 2:50
3. "Loving You Sets Me Free" – 4:23
4. "Intoxifornication" – 4:02
5. "The Truth" – 5:13
6. "Save Me from Myself" – 6:22
7. "I Wanna Seduce You" – 3:13
8. "Electric Girlfriend" – 2:25
9. "Cruel with Me" – 4:02
10. "The World We Love So Much" – 4:38
11. "Wear Your Love Beside You" (hidden track, title listed on Japanese release) – 4:31

== Personnel ==
- Gregg Alexander - vocals, lead guitar, solos, electric and acoustic rhythm guitars
- Danielle Brisebois - backing vocals
- N'Dea Davenport - additional vocals
- Denny Fongheiser - drums
- Laura Harding - additional vocals
- David Munday - additional vocals
- John Pierce - bass guitar
- Rick Nowels - electric guitar, keyboards, piano and bass, additional vocals
- Rudy Richman - drums
- Ben Schultz - lead and rhythm guitars
- Robbie Seidman - additional vocals
- Sandy Stewart - additional vocals
- Maria Vidal - additional vocals
