= Mandy Moore (album) =

Studio album by Mandy Moore
- Released: June 19, 2001
- Recorded: 2000–2001
- Genre: Dance; pop
- Length: 50:12
- Label: Epic
- Producer: Phillip Aaron; Randall Barlow; Todd Chapman; Enrico Cremonesi; Scott Cutler; Alexis Dufrense; Emilio Estefan, Jr.; Pablo Flores; Javier Garza; Gioia & Sheppard; Matthew Hager; Tim Mitchell; Peter Mokran; George Noriega; Anne Preven; James Renald; David Rice; Ken Ross; Jon Secada; Nick Trevesick; David McPherson (executive)

Mandy Moore chronology
I Wanna Be with You (2000)	Mandy Moore (2001)	Coverage (2003)

Singles from Mandy Moore
- 1. "In My Pocket" Released: May 1, 2001; 2. "Crush" Released: September 17, 2001; 3. "Cry" Released: November 4, 2001

Mandy Moore is the second studio album by American singer Mandy Moore. It was released by Epic Records on June 19, 2001. Moore began taking more creative control of her music with the album, transitioning from the teen pop styles from her debut studio album, So Real (1999). The album includes elements of dance, R&B, pop rock, hip hop and Middle Eastern music.

== Background ==
Over one year following the release of So Real (1999), Moore became very displeased with her early music, saying "All of the music has started to look and sound the same" and that she decided that it was time for her to move away from that. She expressed a desire to perform with more live instruments, saying in a Billboard interview that she wanted "no more dancers, no more singing to tracks. I got tired of that in a big way".

The album was a departure in sound for Moore. The opening track "In My Pocket" is a dance-pop song mixed with techno and R&B beats with a Middle Eastern sound. Moore co-wrote the final track on the album, "When I Talk to You". The song was written with Matthew Hager, who produced it. Moore said that the song was written while her and Hager were waiting to do a soundcheck. It was also the first song co-written by Moore that was included on one of her albums.

== Promotion ==
Moore had her first headlined show, called "Mandy Moore Live @ ShoutBack", where she performed the songs:

- "In My Pocket"
- "One Sided Love"
- "Turn the Clock Around"
- "Cry"
- "I Wanna Be with You"
- "When I Talk to You"
- "Candy"

Moore also performed a number of songs live on TV shows, such as on TRL ("In My Pocket" and "Crush"), MTV Asia Sessions ("In My Pocket", "I Wanna Be with You" and "When I Talk to You"), The Rosie O'Donnell Show ("In My Pocket"), Miss Teen USA ("Crush"), Live with Regis and Kelly ("Cry"), The Tonight Show with Jay Leno ("Crush"), Channel V ("Crush"), and at the MTV Asia Awards ("Cry" as a duet with Regine Velasquez), among others. None of the songs from the record were performed at any of Moore's shows after promotion of the album ended.

== Singles ==
The first single released from the album was "In My Pocket", on May 29, 2001. The song did not become a huge hit, but its unique sound allowed Moore to move away from the stereotypical image of other teen pop stars like Christina Aguilera, Jessica Simpson and Britney Spears, all of whom she had spent much of her early career being compared to. "In My Pocket" missed the Billboard Hot 100, but entered the Bubbling Under Hot 100 Singles chart at number two (equivalent to number 102) on June 12, 2001. It performed modestly on CHR radio (the format in which Moore received most of her airplay), peaking at number twenty in Radio & Records. The song also peaked at number 21 on the Pop 100 chart, where it stayed for nine weeks, and also appeared on the seventh installment of U.S. version of the compilation series Now That's What I Call Music!, released in July 2001. "In My Pocket" performed fairly well outside of the United States in countries including Australia, where it reached number 11. The music video, directed by Matthew Rolston, was shot in a nightclub that was given a Middle Eastern look to match the similar feel of the song itself, including belly dancers and fire blowers. Moore sat on a throne and overlooked operations as if she were royalty. In other scenes, Moore is seen dancing and flirting with one of the dancers.

The second single, "Crush", also failed to make much impact on the U.S. charts, but it appeared on the eighth installment of the U.S. compilation series, Now That's What I Call Music!, released in November 2001. The music video was directed by Chris Applebaum and edited by Nabil Mechi. On September 10, 2001, it became Moore's first video to reach the number-one spot on MTV's countdown show Total Request Live. In the video, Moore sits in her crush's room and tries to wake him up. She performs with her band in another room. The video ends with Moore putting on a replica of the jacket Michael Jackson wears in his "Thriller" music video, walks out of her apartment and looks up at her crush and smiles.

The third and final single from the album, "Cry", was featured in the soundtrack for A Walk to Remember.

== Critical reception ==
Professional ratings
Aggregate scores
Source	Rating
Metacritic	56/100
Review scores
Source	Rating
AllMusic	4.5/5 stars
Entertainment Weekly	B-
Rolling Stone	3/5 stars
Slant Magazine	3.5/5 stars

The album scored 56 out of 100 at review aggregator Metacritic, indicating "mixed or average reviews".

AllMusic gave the album a very positive review, saying, "Mandy Moore manages to pack more hooks, melody, beats, clever production flourishes, and fun into its 13 tracks than nearly all of its peers – remarkably, it's a stronger album, through and through, than either of Britney's first two albums or Christina's record..immaculately crafted, precisely polished, & exactly what a teen pop album should be."

Entertainment Weekly gave the album a mostly positive review and a B−, saying that Moore "tries out new sounds -- Eastern rhythms, jangly percussives -- that help separate her from the pack. Best of all, she spares us 'Look at Me!' vocal gyrations in favor of a breathy Natalie Imbruglia vibe. [...] [A]s teen pop goes, it could be a lot worse."

Rolling Stone also gave the album a positive review, saying, "It's so rare and refreshing when a teen star takes the high road...[Mandy's] CD offers the most startlingly liberated teen pop since Eighties mall-rat icon Tiffany euphemistically declared herself 'New Inside'."

Slant Magazine also gave the album a positive review, saying, "Mandy Moore is a refreshingly modest pop/rock excursion that gives Moore the opportunity to differentiate herself from the competition and further solidifies a promising musical future." It was given an honorable mention in the magazine's top music picks of 2001.

The album was chosen as one of Amazon.com's Best of 2001.

== Commercial performance ==
The album debuted at number 35 on the US Billboard 200. The album was certified gold. Four singles reached the Top 40 Mainstream chart in the US, including "In My Pocket", "Crush", "Cry" and "17" was released in Asia, but none reached the Billboard Hot 100. The album had sold 462,000 copies in the U.S., according to Nielsen SoundScan. The Japanese edition of the album also had the bonus track "It's Gonna Be Love". This song was also on the soundtrack of Moore's romantic drama A Walk to Remember (2002).

The album also achieved moderate success worldwide, with Epic deciding that they would release the album where the first one did well. Mandy Moore performed well in Asia, being certified 4× Platinum in Philippines and 33rd Best Selling Album of all time in the Philippines with 200,000 copies sold. In New Zealand it became her second album to hit the top 40, peaking at No. 39. It reached No. 37 on the Australian ARIA Charts, her highest to date.

== Track listing ==
No.	Title	Writer(s)	Producer(s)	Length
1.	"In My Pocket"	E. Estefan, Jr., G. M. Zignago, L. Quintana, R. M. Barlow	Emilio Estefan Jr., Randall Barlow	3:40
2.	"You Remind Me"	Enrico Cremonesi, P. Aaron, R. Safinia	Phillip "The Eraser" Aaron, Enrico Cremonesi	3:34
3.	"Saturate Me"	R. M. Barlow, S. Green*, T. Mitchell	Estefan Jr., Barlow, Tim Mitchell	4:01
4.	"One Sided Love"	E. Estefan, Jr., J. Garza, Jon Secada, P. Flores	Estefan, Jon Secada, Pablo Flores, Javier Garza	4:05
5.	"17"	Shelly Peiken, Todd Chapman	Todd Chapman	3:59
6.	"Cry"	James Renald, Dominic Riccitello	Renald, Peter Mokran	3:43
7.	"Crush"	Kenny Gioia, Shep Goodman	Gioia & Sheppard	3:42
8.	"It Only Took a Minute"	E. Estefan, Jr., G. Noriega, J. Secada, T. Mitchell	Estefan Jr., Secada, Mitchell, George Noriega	3:39
9.	"Turn the Clock Around"	D. Rice, J. W. Baxter, N. Trevisick	David Rice, Nick Trevisick, Alexis Dufresne	3:44
10.	"Yo-Yo"	Scott Cutler, Anne Preven	Cutler & Preven	4:17
11.	"From Loving You"	Diane Warren	Alexis Dufresne	3:34
12.	"Split Chick"	J. Freebairn, M. Elizondo	Matthew Hager	3:44
13.	"When I Talk to You"	Mandy Moore, Matthew Hager	Matthew Hager	4:21
Total length:				50:12

Japanese bonus track
No.	Title	Writer(s)	Producer(s)	Length
14.	"It's Gonna Be Love"	Anthony Micheal Bruno, Thomas V. Bruno	Tony Bruno, Tommy Bruno	3:57
Total length:				54:09

Southeast Asia bonus track
No.	Title	Writer(s)	Length
14.	"I Wanna Be with You" (acoustic version)	Tiffany Arbuckle, Shelly Peiken, Keith Thomas	3:07
Total length:			53:19

Southeast Asia limited edition
No.	Title	Writer(s)	Producer(s)	Length
14.	"Feel Me"	Derek Bramble, Lisa LaShawn, Dion Rambo, Jaques Richmond	Derek Bramble	4:08
15.	"I Wanna Be with You" (acoustic version)	Tiffany Arbuckle, Shelly Peiken, Keith Thomas		3:07
Total length:				57:27

== Personnel ==
Credits for Mandy Moore adapted from AllMusic.

- Mandy Moore – primary artist, vocals (background)
- Gian Marco Zignago – composer
- Diane Warren – composer
- Nick Trevisick – composer
- Chris Theis – engineer
- Danny Simon – vocals (background)
- Darryl Jones – second tracking engineer
- Jon Secada – guest artist
- Jeff Rothschild – assistant engineer
- Ken Ross – producer
- Julie Rogers – string arrangements, violin
- David Rice – composer
- James Renald – composer
- Dave Reed – engineer
- Liza Quintana – composer
- Anne Preven – composer, vocals (background)
- Shelly Peiken – composer
- Peter Mokran – mixing, producer
- Tim Mitchell – composer, producer
- David McPherson – executive producer
- Timothy Loo – cello
- Rich Keller – mixing
- Steve Hallmark – engineer
- Matthew Hager – drum programming, guitar, keyboards, mixing, producer, string arrangements
- Ken Gioia – composer
- Matthew Gerrard – drums, keyboards
- Jenifer J. Freebairn – vocals
- Emilio Estefan, Jr. – composer
- Alexis Dufresne – engineer, producer
- Scott Cutler – composer, engineer, producer
- Todd Chapman – arranger, producer
- Randall Barlow – arranger, composer, producer, programming
- Brett Banduci – viola
- Tommy Anthony – vocals (background)

== Charts ==
Chart (2001)	Peak position
Australian Albums (ARIA)	37
New Zealand Albums (RMNZ)	39
US Billboard 200	35

== Certifications and sales ==
Region	Certification	Certified units/sales
Philippines		200,000
United States (RIAA)	Gold	500,000^{^}
^{^} Shipments figures based on certification alone.

== See also ==
- List of best-selling albums in the Philippines
