= Begin Again (film) =

2013 film by John Carney

- Theatrical release poster
- Directed by: John Carney
- Written by: John Carney
- Produced by: Anthony Bregman; Tobin Armbrust; Judd Apatow
- Starring: Keira Knightley; Mark Ruffalo; Hailee Steinfeld; Adam Levine; James Corden; Yasiin Bey; CeeLo Green; Catherine Keener
- Cinematography: Yaron Orbach
- Edited by: Andrew Marcus
- Music by: Gregg Alexander
- Production companies: Exclusive Media; Sycamore Pictures; Black Label Media; Likely Story; Apatow Productions
- Distributed by: The Weinstein Company
- Release dates: September 7, 2013 (TIFF); June 27, 2014 (United States)
- Running time: 104 minutes
- Country: United States
- Language: English
- Budget: $8 million
- Box office: $84.9 million

Begin Again is a 2013 American musical comedy-drama film written and directed by John Carney, and starring Keira Knightley and Mark Ruffalo. Knightley plays a singer-songwriter who is discovered by a struggling record label executive (Ruffalo) and collaborates with him to produce an album recorded in public locations all over New York City.

After the success of his 2007 musical film Once, Carney wrote the script in 2010 and employed Gregg Alexander to compose most of the film's music. With a US$8 million budget, production began in July 2012 with filming taking place in various locations around New York City. The film premiered under its original title Can a Song Save Your Life? at the 2013 Toronto International Film Festival, and was released theatrically on June 27, 2014, in conjunction with the release of the film's soundtrack. It has grossed $63.4 million worldwide and received mostly positive reviews from critics. It was nominated for an Academy Award for Best Original Song for "Lost Stars".

== Plot ==
Formerly successful record label executive Dan Mulligan lives in New York City, estranged from his wife Miriam and teenage daughter Violet and struggling to keep up with the changing music industry. After being fired in front of his daughter, he goes on a drinking binge, leading him to a bar on the Lower East Side where he encounters Gretta James.

Gretta is a young, fiercely independent songwriter from England, whose longtime boyfriend and songwriting partner is Dave Kohl, a newly successful musician. Upon discovering his affair with a production assistant while in Los Angeles for the weekend, Gretta breaks up with him. After meeting with old best friend Steve, she is invited to come perform at an open-mic night at a club before going home.

Captivated by Gretta's music, Dan offers to sign her to his former record label, to which she eventually agrees. Dan and Gretta meet with Saul, Dan's business partner and co-founder of the record label, but he does not see the same potential in her, turning her away. Undeterred, Dan proposes they produce their own album together, to be recorded live during the summer at various public locations around the city. Recruiting a team of talented musicians, including Steve (a busker), Dan sets out to make an album worthy of being published. During this time, Dan and Gretta bond both personally and professionally, and she takes Violet, a fledgling guitarist, under her wing and encourages her to play on the album.

When Gretta sees Dave accepting an award on television, she criticizes him for selling out to the music industry and, with the help of Steve, she expresses her grievances with him in a song which she records on his voicemail. A remorseful Dave, back in New York promoting his new album, returns her call and asks to see her. After some consideration, she decides to meet with him and they critique each other's albums.

Gretta feels betrayed by Dave's heavily commercialized rendition of "Lost Stars" (a love ballad she had written and composed for him as a Christmas present) and believes the true meaning of the song has been lost. He tells her the audiences love the way he plays it, and that their energy fills the room. He believes that music is about sharing it with people, but Gretta insists it is not what she intended for that song. Nevertheless, Dave invites her to come and hear him play the song at the Gramercy Theatre that weekend so that she can see how his fans react to it.

When Gretta's album is finished, she and Dan meet again with Saul, who is very impressed with their collaboration. She demands Saul give Dan his job back and her a bigger share in the deal. They leave without reaching an agreement, but Dan feels confident that Saul will eventually sign on Gretta. Later, after receiving a text message from Dave reminding her of his concert, Gretta goes to the venue, arriving mid-performance. Initially unaware of her presence, Dave announces that he is going to play "her arrangement" of Lost Stars and encourages her to perform with him on stage.

Watching him play, Gretta is initially happy to hear their song as she envisioned, but when the audience starts to cheer as it climaxes, she realizes that too much has changed. She leaves the concert and cycles through the city with a feeling of newfound hope and closure as a dejected Dave continues to perform.

Afterward, Gretta visits Dan at his apartment as he prepares to move back home, having made amends to his wife. She tells him she does not want him to release her album, instead preferring to distribute it online for $1. Although Dan returns to work with Saul, he agrees to let Gretta release the album online and helps her to promote the release. The next day, Saul jokingly fires Dan for promoting Gretta's album and informs him that it sold 10,000 copies on its first day of release.

== Cast ==
- Keira Knightley as Gretta James, a songwriter
- Mark Ruffalo as Dan Mulligan, a music producer
- Adam Levine as Dave Kohl, Gretta's ex-boyfriend and a successful musician
- Catherine Keener as Miriam Hart, Dan's estranged wife
- Hailee Steinfeld as Violet Mulligan, Dan and Miriam's fourteen-year-old daughter
- James Corden as Steve, Gretta's best friend
- CeeLo Green as Troublegum, a successful rapper who was discovered by Dan
- Yasiin Bey as Saul, Dan's long-time business partner
- Rob Morrow as CEO
- Maddie Corman as Phillis
- Aya Cash as Jenny
- Jennifer Li as Mim

== Production ==
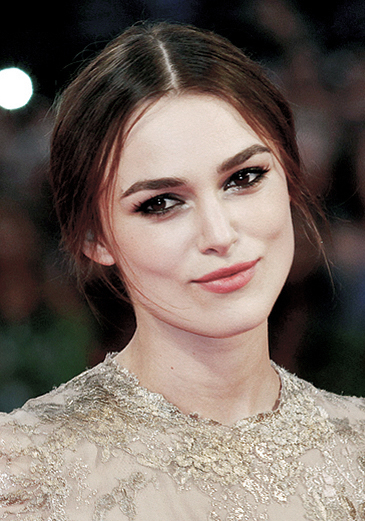
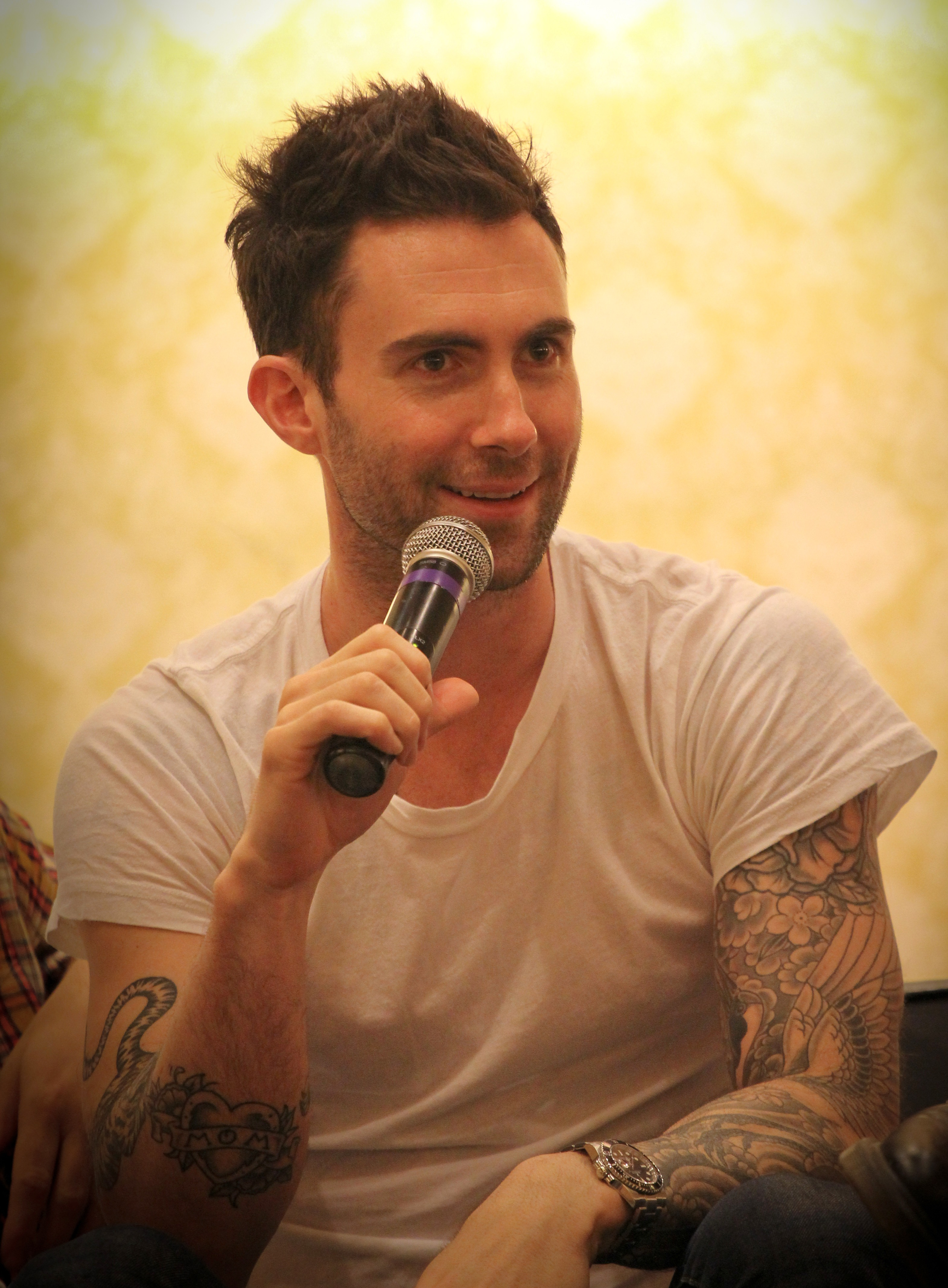
Begin Again marked actress Keira Knightley's first singing role and singer Adam Levine's first acting role in a film.

Director John Carney conceived the premise for Begin Again several years before he began to write the screenplay in 2010. The story was partly inspired by his own experiences as a musician in a band, and from his impression of the artists and repertoire (A&R) executives of record labels during the 1990s, which formed the basis of Dan's character. Carney wrote the script, which was initially titled Can a Song Save Your Life?, before he, Glen Hansard, and Gregg Alexander began writing the songs; he wanted "to work the music around the story, instead of the other way around." The script's style of featuring songs as a natural element of the story was inspired by the 1954 Judy Garland musical film A Star Is Born, and is also employed in Carney's earlier film Once (2007). Carney first pitched the film in 2010 to filmmaker Judd Apatow, who produced the film alongside Tobin Armbrust and Anthony Bregman whose production company Exclusive Media financed the film's US$8 million budget.

Before casting Keira Knightley as Gretta, Carney considered casting a pop singer such as Adele in the main role, as well as a number of other actresses including Scarlett Johansson, who was at one point attached to the project. Knightley, who had never sung professionally before, prepared for the role by training with a vocal coach and learning how to play a guitar. Mark Ruffalo was Carney's first choice for the role of Dan, and agreed to star in the film after Carney sent him the first draft of the screenplay. Singer Adam Levine was also the only person Carney considered casting as Dave, and won the role after talking with Carney over Skype and recording some dialogue as an audition; he declined to be paid for appearing in the film. Although he had had minor acting parts on television before, Begin Again marked Levine's first role in a film. Carney approached James Corden to appear in the film after admiring Corden's performance in the lead role in a Broadway production of One Man, Two Guvnors. Corden worked on the film during the day while continuing to perform the play in the evenings.

Principal photography of the film began in New York City on July 2, 2012, and lasted for 23 days. Carney chose to film in Manhattan's lesser known neighborhoods that would be more recognizable to locals than tourists. Specific locations included Greenwich Village, the East Village, Times Square, and Washington Square Park. Rather than performing live during filming, the actors sang to pre-recorded tracks. In order to save money on hiring a full crew and extras, some scenes—including one in Times Square—were shot late at night with a handheld camera. The rooftop location near the Empire State Building is located at 28 W 36th St.

=== Carney's criticism of Knightley ===
During a series of interviews to promote his film Sing Street in 2016, Carney repeatedly criticized Knightley's performance and comportment while making Begin Again. When asked about the critical reaction to Sing Street by The Independent, Carney responded unprompted that "it's a small personal movie with no Keira Knightleys in it. It's really rewarding." In the same interview, Carney also referred to her repeatedly as a model, despite the fact that Knightley had been working professionally as an actress since childhood, saying "I'll never make a film with supermodels again." He also criticized her in an interview with Heyuguys.com, saying, "I just think with Keira it was like asking her to do something that she could not do." Though he did not specifically name Knightley, he did, in an interview with Den of Geek, say that his desire to make Sing Street came from his "experience of working, let's face it, with a model on my last film". Filmmakers Massy Tadjedin, Mark Romanek, Lorene Scafaria and Lynn Shelton, who had worked with Knightley on other films, expressed their support for her after Carney's comments.

Carney later issued a public apology saying he felt like "a complete idiot" and saying that Knightley was "nothing but professional and dedicated" during the filming of the movie.

In 2019, when asked about Carney's comments, Knightley accepted his apology and revealed that she was not shocked by his earlier comments as they had not gotten along during filming.

== Soundtrack ==
The soundtrack was released on July 1, 2014 in the U.S. by Gregg Alexander's record label ALXNDR, Levine's label 222 Records, Polydor Records, and Interscope Records. Most of the film's music was composed by Alexander with Danielle Brisebois, Nick Lashley, Rick Nowels, and Nick Southwood. Some songs were written and composed by Glen Hansard and Carney, and most were performed by Knightley and Levine. The track "Drowning Pool" by The Walls, which played over the opening credit sequence, is not included on the soundtrack album. The song "Lost Stars" was nominated for numerous awards, including the Academy Award for Best Original Song and the Broadcast Film Critics Association Award for Best Song.

== Release ==
Begin Again premiered on September 7, 2013, at the Toronto International Film Festival. After a tense bidding war, the Weinstein Company acquired the U.S. distribution rights to the film for a $7 million minimum guarantee and at least $20 million in prints and advertising, prevailing over companies including Summit Entertainment/Lionsgate, CBS Films, Fox Searchlight, and A24. It was later screened on April 26, 2014, on the closing night of the Tribeca Film Festival. The film's title was changed from Can a Song Save Your Life? to Begin Again between its festival premiere and its theatrical release because viewers found it difficult to remember and it was often misquoted. In Germany, the original title was kept, while for the French release, it was changed to New York Melody.

=== Box office ===
The film was given a limited release in the United States on June 27, 2014, grossing $134,064 on its opening weekend, and opened in wide release on July 11. It was re-released by The Weinstein Company on August 29, closer to the awards season. The film earned $16,170,632 at the U.S. box office and $68,690,995 internationally for a worldwide total of $84.9 million following subsequent international re-releases. The film made $21.5 million during its original theatrical run in South Korea, where the film was an unexpected hit. Its lifetime gross in South Korea has since increased to $41,416,382, accounting for nearly half of its worldwide box office.

=== Critical response ===
Begin Again received generally positive reviews from critics. On Rotten Tomatoes, the film holds a rating of 83%, based on 170 reviews, with an average rating of 6.90/10. The website's critical consensus reads, "Writer-director John Carney's return to musical drama isn't quite as potent as it was with Once, but thanks to charming work from its well-matched leads, Begin Again is difficult to resist." On Metacritic, the film has a score of 62 out of 100, based on reviews from 39 critics, indicating "generally favorable" reviews.

Rolling Stone critic Peter Travers gave Begin Again three out of four stars, praising the "subtle magic" of the lead actors' performances and Carney's creation of "surreal, enchanting loveliness" without being overly sentimental. Ian Freer of Empire awarded the film four out of five stars, describing it as "lovely stuff, winningly played, open-hearted and guaranteed to slap on a smile on a balmy summer night." In a review for Variety, Peter Debruge wrote that "Gregg Alexander's music is undeniably the best thing" about the film, which "lays emotions on the line and then drives them home with music." The Hollywood Reporter's David Rooney praised the "disarming emotional candor and intimacy" of Carney's script and the chemistry between Knightley and Ruffalo, while David Edelstein of New York enjoyed Ruffalo's "very funny" performance and Knightley's "surprisingly sweet singing voice".

Kenneth Turan of the Los Angeles Times opined that the story and performances felt contrived and that the film as a whole failed to impress as much as Carney's previous musical film Once. A. O. Scott of The New York Times wrote that Begin Again was a "disappointing, overly produced follow-up" to Once and found it "not very good, but ... kind of enjoyable." In a review for The Guardian, Paul MacInnes awarded the film 2 out of 5 stars and described it as "a movie obsessed with authenticity but as phony as a Miley Cyrus dance routine." The Chicago Sun-Times critic Bruce Ingram also found the film hypocritical, noting "the slightly bogus vibe" of the song performances that had been recorded in a studio but were meant to be played live.

== Musical adaptation ==
A stage adaptation will premiere at the Old Globe Theatre in San Diego, California in fall 2026. The musical will be directed by Lorin Latarro and choreographed by David Neumann.

== Accolades ==
Year	Award	Category	Recipient(s)	Result
2015	Academy Awards	Best Original Song	Gregg Alexander and Danielle Brisebois for "Lost Stars"	Nominated
2015	Critics' Choice Awards	Best Song	Keira Knightley performed "Lost Stars"	Nominated
2015	Hollywood Music in Media Awards	Best Original Song in a Feature Film	Gregg Alexander and Danielle Brisebois for "Lost Stars"	Won
