= Someday We'll Know =

Single by New Radicals

from the album Maybe You've Been Brainwashed Too
- Released: March 22, 1999
- Recorded: 1997–1998
- Genre: Alternative rock; pop rock; soft rock
- Length: 3:39
- Label: MCA
- Songwriters: Gregg Alexander; Danielle Brisebois; Debra Holland
- Producer: Gregg Alexander

New Radicals singles chronology
"You Get What You Give" (1998)	"Someday We'll Know" (1999)	"Murder on the Dancefloor" (2024)

"Someday We'll Know" is a song by the New Radicals released in March 1999 as the second and final single from their debut album Maybe You've Been Brainwashed Too (1998). Lyrically, the song explores the confusion over why a relationship ended. The group dissolved before the single's release, and as a result the song failed to match the success of the preceding single, "You Get What You Give", becoming a top 40 hit only in Brazil and Scotland, and failed to chart on the Billboard Hot 100. The song has since been covered by numerous artists, including Mandy Moore & Jon Foreman of Switchfoot, America and Hall & Oates.

== Composition ==
The song is a midtempo ballad in which Gregg Alexander reflects on a past relationship and wonders why his girlfriend left him, eventually concluding that someday he'll know the answer. Rolling Stone called the song "reflective," while Consequence of Sound commented that the song is "relatable to the ever-been-broken-hearted with lines like 'I'm speeding by the place that I met you for the 97th time tonight' and 'If I could ask God just one question: Why aren't you here with me tonight?'"

== Chart performance ==
The single failed to match the success of the previous single "You Get What You Give", due in part to the announcement by lead group member Gregg Alexander that the New Radicals "[would] no longer be a recording, promoting, or performing entity" and that he would focus on producing and writing material for other artists, going on to state "the fatigue of traveling and getting three hours' sleep in a different hotel every night to do boring 'hanging and schmoozing' with radio and retail people is definitely not for me." The song received minimal promotion and was far less successful than its predecessor, "You Get What You Give". "Someday We'll Know" achieved its highest peak on the Billboard Adult Top 40 chart where it peaked at number 28 on August 7, 1999. The song failed to enter the Billboard Hot 100. The song debuted at number 48 on the UK Singles Chart on the chart dated 25 September 1999 and fell to number 76 the following week.

== Music video ==
Directed by Lawrence Carroll, the video features the whole band playing the song in a damp warehouse with Gregg Alexander on guitar. It features scenes of people in different places: a laundromat, a bus, a diner, and a pool. In one scene, a lonely woman sits alone stirring her coffee, and the end of the video shows an empty seat at the back of a bus. The group disbanded while the music video was still being produced.

== Track listing ==
1. "Someday We'll Know" (Gregg Alexander, Danielle Brisebois, Debra Holland) – 3:39
2. "The Decency League" (Alexander) – 3:30
3. "Technicolor Lover" (Alexander) – 3:42
4. "Someday We'll Know (Instrumental)" (Alexander, Brisebois, Holland) – 3:39

== Cover versions ==
"Someday We'll Know" has been widely covered. The song was covered by Mandy Moore and Jon Foreman on the A Walk to Remember soundtrack, by Hall & Oates on their 2003 album Do It for Love and live by Ronan Keating during his 2002 Destination Everywhere Tour. The Mandy Moore and Jon Foreman version was sampled by Shawnna on her song "Chicago" (featuring Buddy Guy, Avant & Malik Yusef) from her 2006 album Block Music. The Hall & Oates version included a guest appearance by Todd Rundgren on guitar and vocals. An acoustic cover of the song was done by MYMP on their 2011 album The Unreleased Acoustic Collection. A cover of the song was also done by English-American folk rock band America on their 2011 album Back Pages.

== Charts ==
=== Weekly charts ===
Chart (1999–2000)	Peak position
Australia (ARIA)	79
Germany (GfK)	79
Italy Airplay (Music & Media)	4
Scotland Singles (OCC)	40
Netherlands (Single Top 100)	75
New Zealand (Recorded Music NZ)	45
UK Singles (OCC)	48
US Billboard Adult Pop Songs	28
