= Michigan Rain =

Studio album by Gregg Alexander
- Released: 1989
- Recorded: 1987–1989
- Genre: Pop rock
- Length: 41:08
- Label: A&M
- Producer: Rick Nowels

Gregg Alexander chronology
Michigan Rain (1989)	Intoxifornication (1992)

Professional ratings
Review scores
Source	Rating
AllMusic	4.5/5 stars

Michigan Rain is the debut album by the American musician Gregg Alexander, released in 1989 by A&M Records.

The album was originally supposed to be titled Save Me from Myself, but the title was changed at the last minute, because, as Alexander explained, "[...] the cover was me standing on a bridge with a broken mirror on my wrist and it was before the suicide chic thing."

"In the Neighborhood" was released as a single, backed with "Don't Cry, Mrs. Davis".

"Michigan Rain" was re-recorded for his 1992 album Intoxifornication. The album also featured an extended mix of "Save Me from Myself", and identically reprised tracks "Loving You Sets Me Free", "Cruel with Me" and "The World We Love So Much".

The album was not very successful on release, being a minor hit in Italy. Despite Alexander's later success with New Radicals, Michigan Rain was taken out of print when he was dropped from A&M, and has long been rare and out of print. It is also the only one of his albums to have been released on vinyl, though CD and cassette versions were also produced.

== Critical reception ==
Michigan Rain received mixed reviews in 1989, with critics praising the then-19-year-old Alexander's flair and potential but feeling the album was uneven overall. Jim Yardley wrote in The Anniston Star that Alexander displayed a "quirky sense of humour (and a) pop-music, danceable style" but needed to "broaden his scope and look beyond such banalities (of) silly, sophomoric lyrics". In a similar vein, Neil Randall of Waterloo Region Record wrote that Alexander's songwriting showed positive signs for a bright future with "real melodies" and "a good intuition for the lyric of sadness", but that the album overall was "only interesting, not captivating". Surrey Now-Leader's Dale Winnitowy called Alexander "uninhibited, explosive, but tempered with finesses" and compared him to Eric Carmen and Prince, concluding that "the musical world will not be able to ignore him forever". Paul Wagner in the Santa Cruz Sentinel wrote that Alexander was "not ready yet to stop imitating everyone famous within earshot; when he is, we'll be listening".

== Track listing ==
All songs written by Gregg Alexander.

1. "In the Neighborhood" – 4:08
2. "Michigan Rain" – 2:47
3. "Loving You Sets Me Free" – 4:27
4. "Cruel with Me" – 4:05
5. "Save Me from Myself" – 5:16
6. "Ev'ry Now and Then" – 3:48
7. "Don't Cry Mrs. Davis" – 5:51
8. "Sinner Times Ten" – 3:41
9. "Five and Dimes and Petty Crimes" – 2:48
10. "The World We Love So Much" – 4:12

== Personnel ==
- Gregg Alexander - vocals, electric and acoustic guitars
- Kenny Aronoff - drums
- N'Dea Davenport - principal background vocalist
- Denny Fongheiser - drums
- Laura Harding - additional background vocals
- Charles Judge - keyboards, acoustic piano
- Michael Landau - guitar
- David Munday - additional background vocals
- Rick Nowels - electric and acoustic guitars, keyboards and acoustic piano, additional background vocals
- John Pierce - bass
- Rudy Richman - drums
- Ben Schultz - guitars
- Robbie Seidman - additional background vocals
- Sandy Stewart - additional background vocals
- Maria Vidal - additional background vocals
