= Brad Fernquist =

American musician

Brad Fernquist is a music producer, songwriter and guitarist. Fernquist is primarily known for his work with Buffalo, New York based rock band the Goo Goo Dolls. At 17 years old, Fernquist began touring with regional cover bands where he was able to develop his technique and perfect his tone. Brad attended Berklee College of Music in Boston, Massachusetts for one semester but ultimately left the school once his gigging schedule started to grow.

Fernquist has become well-known in the music industry for his songwriting and producing credits as well as his guitar expertise. His first audition was with popular 1990s rock group The New Radicals with whom he toured extensively. Since leaving the New Radicals, Fernquist has toured with Fastball, Hilary Duff, Lisa Marie Presley, Bonnie McKee, and most notably Michelle Branch.

While not on the road Fernquist works as a session guitarist. He played most of the lead guitar on Paul Stanley's "Live to Win" album. In early 2006, Brad joined the Goo Goo Dolls for their extensive "Let Love In" tour which kept him out on the road for the better part of 2 years. Brad is currently recording an instrumental EP in the California Desert that incorporates lo-fi ambient desert soundscapes.

== Gear ==
Fernquist's distinguished modern guitar sound is accomplished through his use of Gibson, Fender, and Rock n' Roll Relic guitars, as well as Divided by 13 and Victoria amplifiers. He also uses many different effect by companies such as Catalinbread, Xotic Effects, Real McCoy Custom, Line 6, and Fulltone. He also uses D'Addario Strings
