= Big World (disambiguation) =

Big World is a 1986 live album of original songs by Joe Jackson.

Big World may also refer to:

- Big World (Stevie McCrorie album), 2016
- Big World (Conrad Sewell song), a 2019 song by Australian musician Conrad Sewell
- Big World (film), a 2024 Chinese coming-of-age drama film directed by Yang Lina
- Big World Pictures, an American film production company

== See also ==
- Big World Cafe, a 1989 British TV music show
- The Big World of Little Adam, a series of U.S. television cartoons that debuted in 1964
- A Great Big World, an American musical duo from New York
- Big Big World (disambiguation)
- Big World Small World, a 2000 album by Smith & Mighty
- Elizabeth Stanton's Great Big World, an American educational television series
- Little People, Big World, an American reality television series that premiered in 2006
