= Howard Rose =

Howard Rose may refer to:

- Howie Rose, American sportscaster
- Howard Rose (musician) in The Voice UK (series 4)
