= Polly Perkins =

British actress, singer and writer (born 1943)

- Born: Gillian Nessie Arnold; 31 May 1943 (age 83); London, England
- Occupations: Actress, singer, writer
- Years active: 1959–2012
- Children: Tim Arnold, Toby Tobias

Polly Perkins (born Gillian Nessie Arnold, 31 May 1943) is a British actress, singer and writer. Perkins rose to fame in the 1960s as a popstar, going on to regularly appear in theatre and cabaret throughout the UK. She is known for playing Rose Cotton, the half-sister of Dot Cotton (June Brown), in the BBC soap opera EastEnders between 2011 and 2012.

== Early and personal life ==
Perkins was born Gillian Nessie Arnold to theatrical parents Dickie and Mitzi, who both had a successful career performing a cabaret/vaudeville act. Dickie's second wife, Dottie Arnold, was also a successful variety performer. Perkins has two children, singer songwriter Tim Arnold and film producer/director Toby Tobias.

== Career ==
Perkins started her career performing at the Windmill Theatre in Soho.

During the 1960s, Perkins was a teen pop star, a BBC thespian and the first compere of the cult TV show Ready Steady Go!. She starred in stage musicals as diverse as Salad Days and Let My People Come, and appeared in episodes of Minder, The Sweeney, Rules of Justice and Nanny. Perkins was the leading lady in many West End cabaret clubs including The Latin Quarter, Blue Angel, The Celebrite, The Gaslight, The Directors Lodge, The Gargoyle, The Piano Bar and Madame Jojo's.

She also ran and performed in her own club "Polly's Candlelight" in Mayfair from 1977-78.

Perkins was cast as Trish Valentine, a washed-up nightclub singer, in the BBC soap opera Eldorado from 1992 to 1993. In 2011, she returned to the stage in the debut performance of songs from her son's new musical Secrets of Soho at The Phoenix Artist Club.

In May 2011, it was announced by that Perkins would be joining the cast of BBC soap opera EastEnders as Rose, the estranged half-sister of Dot Branning. Speaking of her casting, Perkins said "I am thrilled to be joining the cast of EastEnders, the show is a real British institution with an extraordinary creative team. I'm really looking forward to working with June again, who I have been friends with for over 30 years."

== Filmography ==
=== Television ===
- BBC Sunday Night Play-She's A Free Country
- The Colony
- Menace
- The Sweeney
- Flickers
- Rules of Justice
- Nanny
- Play For Today-Wayne And Albert
- Eldorado
- EastEnders (2011–12)

=== Stage ===
- Salad Days
- Let My People Come
- Blood Brothers (Salon Varietés Production)

=== Film ===
- Take It or Leave It
- The Mumbo Jumbo

== Discography ==
=== Albums ===
- Pop Lore According to the Academy (1969) - Reissued on CD and is available digitally.
- Liberated Woman (1973)
- Polly (1977)

=== Singles ===
- I Reckon You (1963)
- Sweet As Honey (1963)
- Young Lover (1964)
- I Went By Your House Today (1964)
- Munching The Candy (1969)
- Coochie Coo (1973)

== Bibliography ==
- Songs for the Liberated Woman (1973)
- Far Too Dainty (2003)
