= Super Connected =

Album by Tim Arnold

Studio album by Tim Arnold
- Released: 5 May 2023
- Genre: Art Rock-pop
- Length: 52min
- Label: TA Music
- Producers: Tim Arnold, Jonathan Noyce and Ben Pelchat

Tim Arnold chronology
Maybe Magic (2022)	Super Connected (2023)

Super Connected is the 26th studio album and first feature-length film drama by English musician Tim Arnold. The album was released on 5 May 2023 and is also the basis for the ongoing multimedia theatre show of the same name. Written and produced by Arnold, the concept album has an art-rock mixed-genre sound. Lyrically, it explores the insidious rise of tech, focusing on addiction, mental health, consumerism and compassion for those affected by screen dependency. The completion of the album culminated in Arnold's diagnosis of autism spectrum disorder. Upon release, the album was met with critical acclaim and unanimous praise in what The Times called "a surprisingly uncharted territory".

== Background and release ==
Super Connected follows Arnold's 2022 25th album Maybe Magic. Super Connected was seven years in the making. According to Arnold, Super Connected was inspired by Italian psychiatrist Ricardo Cavrioli and his work in the mental health field, assessing teenagers suffering with screen addiction.

It was written and produced by Arnold, and features co-production by Jonathan Noyce and Ben Pelchat.

According to Prog magazine, the album incorporates multiple genres including pop, rock, prog and synth funk, with a "lyrical narrative that takes aim at big tech's insidious footprints across our lives".

“I wanted to use sounds that big tech companies use to trigger dopamine. But I wanted to use those sounds melodically, alongside lyrics that are about companies using those sounds to trigger dopamine.”

— Arnold on the album The Strange Brew

The record was announced in May 2021 in God Is In The TV, but would not be released until May 2023. The first track, 'Start With The Sound', served as the lead single from the album. It won track of the week in Prog magazine.

== Critical reception for Super Connected: The Album ==
Super Connected has been reviewed by numerous publications including The Times, Mojo, The Quietus, Prog, Clash, Rock'n'Reel, Classic Pop, The Big Issue, Culture Catch, and Neurodiverse Review.

Writing for Mojo, Martin Aston explained the album's title as a reference to "The enslavement to, and big tech surveillance of, our phone and computer screens". Will Hodgkinson writing in The Times' 'Albums of the Week' described the subject as dealing with "the loneliness of the digital landscape". Reviewing for Clash, Gareth James hailed Arnold's opening track ‘Start With The Sound’ as a "complex, angular synth-pop masterwork". James described the album as "A concept album of sorts that explores the impact of social media on our mental health and the power of the tech giants". Similarly, Johnny Spears of Prog Magazine lauded Arnold's "versatility" with a "deft touch when bending a range of rock and pop styles to his will", describing the album as "a conceptual lyrical narrative taking aim at big tech's insidious footprints across our lives".

== Critical reception for Super Connected: The Live Show ==
Writing for New York's Culture Catch, Robert Cochrane wrote: "A filmic essay, post-Warholian in tone, it lands a visual punch upon the virtual world. Dystopian by nature the concept harnesses his frustrations well to purvey the threat he perceives. A polymath's exercise on how connections can be anything but."

Super Connected's live performances have garnered widespread acclaim for their innovative blend of film, music, and theatre. Writing for Get Ready To Rock, James Ollerenshaw praised the show as "full of emotion, energy and thought-provoking," highlighting Tim Arnold’s songwriting and film direction alongside Kate Alderton's "accomplished stage arrangements" as a perfect match for the multimedia experience, while Reading Today referred to the performance as "the silent movie reborn for the 21st century."

Writing for Isle of Wight County Press, Ryan Morwood described the show as "an innovative mix of film, music and theatre," underscoring the fusion of different art forms. Sussex Online News praised the "immaculate songwriting," calling the production a "remarkable event." In The Bath and Wiltshire Parent, the show was highlighted for its exploration of modern family dynamics, noting "how parents and teenagers navigate their relationships with each other in the new reality of digital distraction."

== Censorship and Apple ==
On 3 July 2023, music and culture website and magazine Louder Than War reported that Super Connected had been banned by Apple on their Apple Music streaming service. It was claimed the ban resulted from Track 6: ‘A Commercial Break’, a short sketch and spoof parody ad, featuring British actor Stephen Fry humorously describing the benefits of the "iHead", a fictional immersive headset at the centre of the concept album's narrative story and accompanying feature film.

The 'iHead'. Tim Arnold's parody headset from 'Super Connected'.

An open letter to Apple written by Arnold gained support from notable signatories such as Kaiser Chiefs‘ Ricky Wilson, 10CC's Kevin Godley, Spandau Ballet's Gary Kemp and human rights campaigner Peter Tatchell.

Apple news website 9to5mac.com reported that the “iHead” has similarities to Apple's Vision Pro spatial computer, with Arnold saying that this might be the reason the track, and subsequently the album, were not permitted on Apple Music, with online gaming magazine iGame News stating that Apple had banned an 'innocent parody of The Vision Pro'.

Future Plc's art and design site Creative Bloq announced that “the tech giant doesn't seem to want anyone taking the mick out of what will be its first entirely new product in years”.

Technology and science news outlet Tech Times subsequently revealed that Arnold's "iHead" was created in 2019 by Arnold and special effects artist Valerie Charlton. According to the official Super Connected website, the 'iHead' was completed with digital rendering by global talent director of Framestore Andrew Schlussel, four years before Apple announced the Vision Pro. Creative industries website 'Design Taxi' wrote "The imaginary gadget is mounted with a row of iPhones, and is envisioned to connect people's imaginations with the sense of sound", illustrated in the article by two videos directed by Arnold, both featuring the iHead.

In response, Apple informed Arnold that the ban stemmed from the presence of a fake ad rather than the content that was speculated to be targeting the Vision Pro headset.

Arnold said the fake ad was an important part of the album, a satire on how digital services have affected our music and our lives through the insertion of commercials. On 11 July, ten days after Arnold's publicly supported and celebrity endorsed open letter was published, Music News reported that Apple and digital distributor Ditto Music finally solved the delayed distribution of ‘Super Connected’ with the album now available on the Apple Music streaming service.

== Super Connected: The Film ==
"The film that can't be streamed" - IMDB. Following the story of a tech-dependent family, the film Super Connected explores the burgeoning mental health crisis emerging due to our increased isolation and growing dependency on social media.

Collaborators include costume design by Hazel Pethig, whose credits include Doctor Who, Monty Python and the Holy Grail, Terry Gilliam's Time Bandits, Kate Bush's The Line, the Cross and the Curve and as reported by entertainment website Music News, a "thrilling vocal cameo" from Stephen Fry. After its first public screening at London's Roundhouse, journalist Charles Donovan wrote in Rock'n'Reel of the film: "Those of us lucky enough to see and hear… came away changed, whether slightly or greatly, for the better. Poignant, funny, ominous and heartrending."

In 2024, Tim Arnold was quoted in The Belfast Newsletter, that despite growing demand, plans to release the feature-length film on streaming platforms are not being considered.

"It’s rare these days for a film to only exist as a shared experience. Most entertainment is distilled into content we consume alone. Super Connected is about stepping outside our solitary filter bubble to experience more together, in the real world. This film has work to do in the real world before it joins the digital landfill!"

— Tim Arnold, Speaking to The Belfast Newsletter

Nick Couldry, Professor of Media, Communications and Social Theory at the London School of Economics, said: "No musician gets the issues around surveillance capitalism and data colonialism like Tim Arnold".

== Super Connected: live performances ==
The live multimedia show of Super Connected was workshopped in 2022 under the direction of actress and theatre director Kate Alderton at SXSW in Austin, Texas and The Temple of Art And Music in London. Alderton adapted Super Connected for the stage in its first public performance at London's Roundhouse in May, 2023 to coincide with the album release. Speaking about the show and Alderton's development of the piece, Arnold said:

"The message of Super Connected is fairly straight forward in the way it focuses on how much our lives are dominated by tech and screens, but artistically it's a complex beast. Through Kate Alderton's directorial lens, the two elements (the album and the film) became unified. She found a way to make me, my pianist Sarah Kershaw, the album and the film, all become characters in a piece of theatre."

— Tim Arnold

The production blends live performance, film, and music to create an immersive experience that critiques technology addiction. Arnold performs the Super Connected album live on stage while the accompanying feature film, in which he also acts, is projected behind him. Arnold's on-stage performance is integrated with the on-screen action, as he interacts with the film's characters while facing the screen. This integration of live performance and film creates a unified narrative, enhancing the multimedia rock opera style of the production.

In May 2024, Super Connected embarked on its first tour, beginning on 9 May at Quay Arts on the Isle of Wight and concluding on 4 June at The Cockpit Theatre in London. Other stops included Liverpool, Bath, Reading and the Brighton Fringe Festival.

Writing for Fringe Review UK, writer Roger Kay said:

"This production is a warning to humanity about today’s digital age and chillingly the one that inexorably will follow. Any piece of art should have the audience leave with more than they entered the room with. Super Connected definitely succeeds : it is a hugely significant piece of work, containing a vital message, carefully constructed and brilliantly performed. Outstanding"

— Roger Kay, Fringe Review 2024

The tour featured Arnold performing the Super Connected album live, accompanied by its feature film and pianist Sarah Kershaw. The production included sound design by Jim Warren, longstanding front of house sound engineer for Radiohead

The first day of the tour coincided with growing global debates about the harms of smartphone use, particularly among children and teenagers. During this period, public discourse intensified around the mental health impact of excessive screen time. UK Parliament held its first debate on the effects of social media on children, while articles such as The Independent’s "Screens and Teens: How Phones Broke Children’s Brains" and The Guardian’s "Are Kids Losing Their Love of Music?" highlighted the societal consequences of technology overuse. Internationally, Danish Prime Minister Mette Frederiksen proposed a 15+ age limit for social media across the EU, and the New York governor introduced a bill to ban smartphones in schools. The production of Super Connected mirrored these discussions by exploring the effects of digital dependency with audience interaction which became a defining feature of the tour. Each performance began with a "PhoneFreeze" ritual, where audience members placed their phones in lockable pouches to encourage full engagement with the show. Afterward, attendees could participate in optional "Screenless Social" discussions with the creative team.

Writing for Get ready To Rock after the Cockpit Theatre show, James Ollerenshaw said:

"The production challenges us to reflect on our own relationship with social media and screen usage. I for one will be thinking twice about next using my smartphone and tablet."

As the tour gained momentum, growing attention from healthcare professionals led to a private showcase of the production in Soho for leading National Health Service doctors from campaign group Health Professionals for Safer Screens, who subsequently went on to give evidence in Parliament about the harms of smartphones on children.

Attention from educators culminated in the first show at a school; Harrodian School in London, marking an important step in engaging younger audiences and educational institutions directly. The performance at the school sparked conversations about the role of technology in students' lives and the importance of healthier digital habits in an age of increasing screen dependency.

=== International premiere (2026) ===
In February 2026, the production had its international premiere as part of the inaugural OFF February festival in Madrid. The Tim Arnold Company presented Super Connected at the Teatro Soho Madrid on 20 February. The performance coincided with a period of intensified public debate in Spain regarding digital safety, following Prime Minister Pedro Sánchez's announcement of plans to restrict social media access for minors under 16.

The sold-out show was met with standing ovations, demonstrating the work's universal reach. Because the accompanying feature film is a silent film, the production’s narrative is accessible to non-English speaking audiences. The event received significant media coverage in Spain, including a four-page feature interview with A. nold in El País. Arnold also appeared on national radio to discuss his work's international reach on the RNE arts programme El Ojo Crítico and was featured in a career-spanning interview with Santiago Alcanda on the Radio 3 show Como Lo Oyes. During the broadcast, Alcanda described Arnold as a "genius" and a "complete artist".

== UK Government petition ==
In 2025, Super Connected expanded beyond its album, film and live performances when creator Tim Arnold launched The Super Connected Petition, a UK Government petition calling for a legal right to access essential services without being required to use digital devices. The petition argues that British citizens should be able to obtain healthcare, education, banking, travel and cultural services through non-digital options, protecting what Arnold describes as "the right to choose a non-digital or digital life". It seeks to ensure that parents can decide how much time their children spend on screens in schools and that technology remains "a choice, not a requirement".

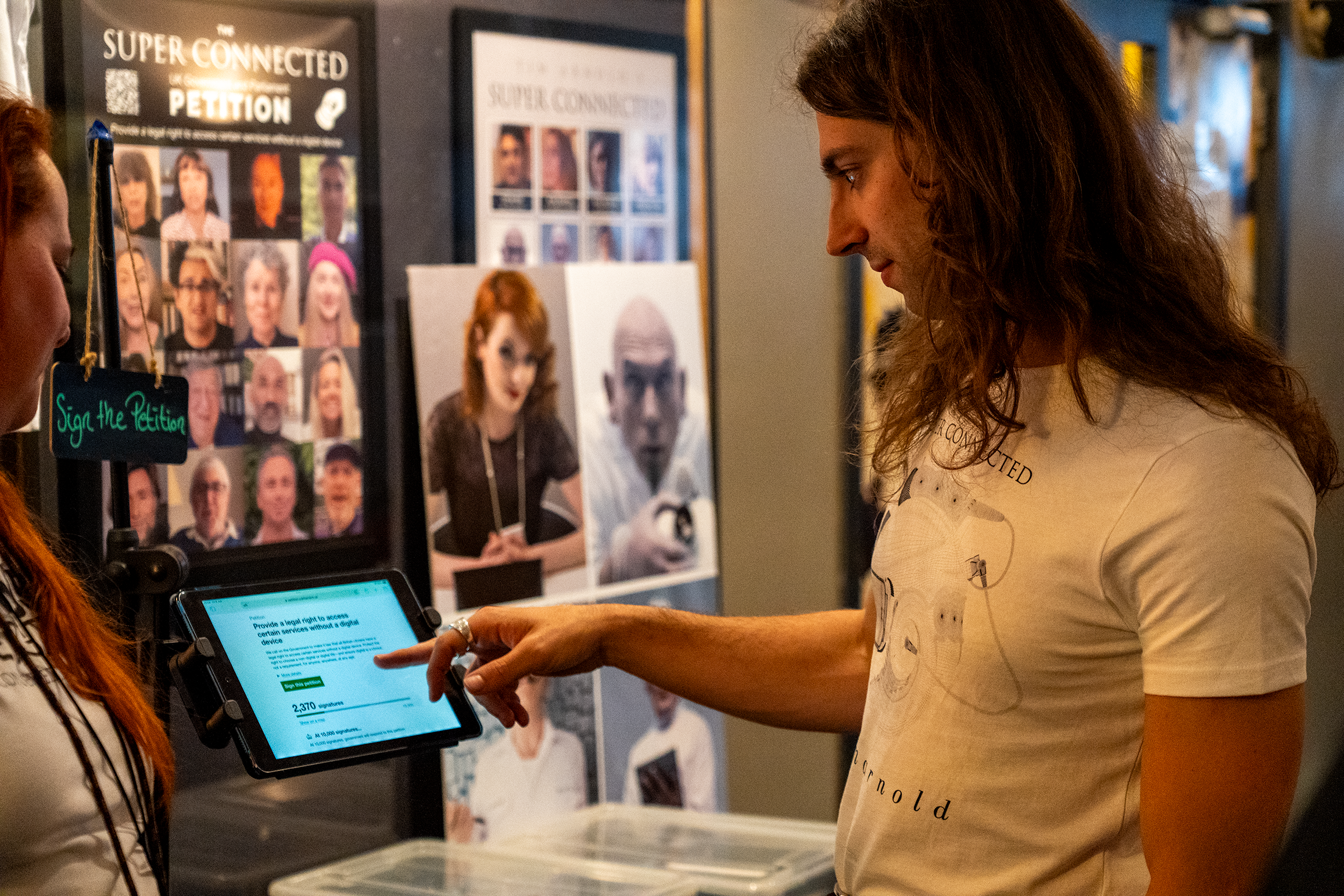
A member of the public signing The Super Connected Petition at one of Tim Arnold’s Super Connected Live events (The Cockpit Theatre, London, 2025)

To promote the campaign, Arnold created a short film featuring public figures including Sir Stephen Fry, Chrissie Hynde, and several UK teachers and doctors, in which they voiced support for the petition’s aims.

Explaining his motivation, Arnold said:

“We all love technology, but it should be a choice, not a requirement. When it comes to the digital dial on your child’s life, unregulated tech companies turn it all the way up to the limit, even in schools. Parents should have their hands on that dial, not tech companies.”

The petition gained support from prominent public figures including Olivia Colman, Midge Ure, Imelda Staunton, Chrissie Hynde, and Stephen Fry, as well as teachers and health professionals. Supported by Arts Council England and Help Musicians, Arnold used his Super Connected Live tour to actively promote the petition, enabling audiences to sign both online and in person at each venue. Offering a physical signing option was described as an act of inclusivity and access, ensuring participation for those without access to digital devices. Arnold added:

“Real life shouldn’t need a login — not for children, or for the vulnerable who need to access healthcare.”

If the petition reaches 10,000 signatures, the Government must issue a formal response; at 100,000 signatures, the topic becomes eligible for parliamentary debate.

== Track listing ==
All tracks were written and produced by Arnold.

Super Connected track listing
No.	Title	Length
1.	"Start With The Sound"	5:08
2.	"Super Connected"	4:42
3.	"You Like My Pictures"	3:44
4.	"The Touch of A Screen"	4:16
5.	"Start A Conversation"	4:37
6.	"A Commercial Break" (featuring Stephen Fry and Kate Alderton)	1:48
7.	"Everything Entertains"	3:41
8.	"Send More Light"	4:17
9.	"The Complete Solution"	5:51
10.	"Where Am I In All Of This?"	5:28
11.	"Finally Everybody's Talking"	5:25
12.	"Make Me All Right"	3:23
Total length:		52:00
