= Big World (Stevie McCrorie album) =

Studio album by Stevie McCrorie
- Released: January 8, 2016
- Genre: Acoustic, folk, rock
- Length: 35:47
- Label: Decca

Stevie McCrorie chronology
These Old Traditions (2010)	Big World (2016)	Days Like These (2019)

Big World is the debut studio album released by Scottish singer Stevie McCrorie, released on 8 January 2016 via Decca Records. McCrorie rose to prominence in 2015 following his victory on the TV talent show, The Voice UK. Following his victory on the show, he released the single "Lost Stars" which became the first winners single from The Voice to chart within the top ten of the singles charts in the United Kingdom. Additionally, it reached number one in his native Scotland, but was not included on the album. The lead and only single released to support the album was "My Heart Never Lies" which was released on 13 November 2015.

== Background ==
In 2015, McCrorie auditioned for the fourth series of The Voice UK performing Kodaline's "All I Want", with all four coaches turning for him. He eventually chose to join Ricky Wilson's team. On 4 April 2015 on the live show, it was announced that McCrorie was the winner of The Voice UK 2015. He had beaten the only other remaining contestant, opera singer Lucy O'Byrne. He was nicknamed "The Hero" during the competition. Following his victory, McCrorie described the situation and his subsequent win on The Voice UK as being "a stepping stone to becoming the artist I want to be", claiming that he did not wish to "take the easy route", further adding that he "wanted to take the harder approach to prove I am a songwriter".

Prior to his victory on The Voice UK, he self–released his debut album These Old Traditions in 2010. In comparison, Big World was described by Haydon Benfield in Renowned for Sound as being "too polished", describing the album as "calibrated to tick all the boxes to ensure maximum airplay and make it the de facto soundtrack to days spent working in the office, or wiling away time shopping". Additionally, Benfield said that with the album, McCrorie "amply demonstrated that he can do commercial pop with aplomb".

== Release ==
The album was supported by the release of only one single – "My Heart Never Lies" which was released in November 2015. His winners single, "Lost Stars", was not included on the album. "My Heart Never Lies" achieved moderate commercial success in his native Scotland, debuting at number fifty one on the Scottish Singles Charts. Big World debuted on the UK Albums Charts at number thirty-five, despite a mid–week chart update placing the album at number twenty-two. In the United Kingdom, it spent a total of two weeks within the UK Top 100. In his native Scotland, it debuted at four, and spent a combined total of seven weeks within the Scottish Top 100. Additionally, it peaked at number thirty-three on the UK Albums Sales Charts, twenty-five on the UK Album Downloads Chart and forty-nine on the UK Physical Albums Charts.

To promote the album, he made an appearance on The Voice in 2016 on the first live shows, and performed "My Heart Never Lies". Following the performance, Big World re-entered the Scottish Albums Chart at number 15 and UK Albums Chart at number 70, while My Heart Never Lies re-entered at a new peak of 45 on the Scottish Singles Chart.

== Critical reception ==
Following the albums release, critical reception was largely positive, with High Res Audio saying that the album is "brimming with infectious, personal and emotive tunes, the work of a man who has finally been able to make the music that’s been in him for years". The track "My Heart Never Lies", which was later released as a single, was described as "the perfect introduction to Stevie’s own style – heartfelt and honest and demanding of repeat listening". York Press awarded the album three out of five available stars and highlighted the album track "My Heart Never Lies" as a standout track from the album.

== Track listing ==
1. "My Heart Never Lies" – 3:11
2. "Take Our Time" – 3:02
3. "Cannonballs" – 3:15
4. "Killing Time" – 3:32
5. "Big World" – 3:57
6. "If We Wait" – 3:39
7. "Save It For Me" – 2:26
8. "Stone" – 3:42
9. "Don't Go" – 3:35
10. "Turn It Around" – 3:38
11. "Lungs" – 3:50

== Charts ==
Chart (2016)	Peak position
Scottish Albums (OCC)	4
UK Albums (OCC)	35
UK Albums Sales (OCC)	33
UK Albums Downloads (OCC)	25
UK Physical Albums (OCC)	49
