= Greenborne =

British radio soap opera

- Genre: Radio drama
- Running time: 15 minutes
- Country of origin: United Kingdom
- Home station: Various
- Created by: Colin Brake; Andrew Mark Sewell
- Written by: Colin Brake; Bev Doyle; Angela Churm
- Original release: 21 March – 6 June 2021
- No. of series: 1
- No. of episodes: 12
- Audio format: Stereophonic sound
- Opening theme: Greenborne
- Website: greenborne.co.uk

Greenborne is a British radio soap opera set in Greenborne, a fictional rural village. Created by Colin Brake and Andrew Mark Sewell and produced by B7 Media, the first episode of Greenborne was broadcast on 21 March 2021 and the last (as of 2024) on 6 June 2021. It is broadcast initially on over 30 community radiostations, such as Swindon 105.5, and Tring Radio.

== Plot ==
The series is set in the near future, the summer of 2021, as the residents of the fictional village of Greenborne emerge from the constraints of the COVID-19 pandemic.

== Production ==
Greenborne was devised by Colin Brake and Andrew Mark Sewell and written by Colin Brake, Bev Doyle and Angela Churm. It features an ensemble cast headed by John Altman and Louise Jameson, known from EastEnders and Corrinne Wicks from Doctors and Emmerdale. Altman has described it as "a raunchier version of The Archers". The making of the programme received funding from the Department for Digital, Culture, Media and Sport through the Government's Audio Content Fund. Series One, comprising twelve episodes, each of which has a running time of 15 minutes, was recorded in January and February 2021 with the first episode being released on 21 March 2021 and from then on a weekly basis until 6 June 2021.

== Theme music ==
The theme tune was written by Tim Arnold.

== Cast and characters ==
- John Altman as Alan Godwin, a retired Metropolitan policeman, he is the landlord of the village pub, The Fox and Dragon.
- Corrinne Wicks as Beverley Godwin, Alan Godwin's younger second wife is the landlady of The Fox and Dragon and was wild in her younger days.
- Finley Pile as Lewis Godwin, Alan's son from his first marriage, he is a party animal with a bad reputation and did poorly at school.
- Luci Fish as Daisy Godwin, Alan's daughter from his first marriage, she is the opposite of her brother and is studious and intelligent.
- Louise Jameson as Evelyn Lejeune, a pillar in the Greenborne community, she is a domineering mother and headteacher of the village school.
- Ally Murphy as Elise Lejeune, Evelyn's daughter, she is the chef at The Fox and Dragon and is dominated by her mother.
- Pal Aron as Samesh Sharma, an ex-colleague and friend of Alan's from working in the police.
- Raj Ghatak as Arjun Sharma, the son of Samesh, he owns the local garage and lost his nurse wife to coronavirus; he has started dating Elise.
- Shash Hira as Jeet Sharma, the son of Arjun, he works at the garage and is an aspiring DJ; he occasionally covers at the local radio station.
- Bhavnisha Parmar as Piya Chandola, the sister of Arjun's late wife she is a trouble causer particularly to Arjun with whom she was going to have an arranged marriage.
- Ali Zayn as Matthew Jefferson, affected by his father's departure, Matthew is a hypochondriac and gets wild ideas.
- Amy Rockson as Tanny Jefferson, the wife of Matthew, she runs the local village shop and post office.
- Niamh McGrady as Sandra Davis, the owner of the local hairdressers-cum-coffee shop. She is Beverley's best friend and recently came out as a lesbian.
- Rebecca Yeo as Chloe Chan, he mysterious baker who seems to upset everyone.
- Raad Rawi as Farhad Madani, the sixty-something good-looking Iranian oil painter who lives in the converted old school house but hides a dark side.
- Joshua Manning as Logan Cockburn, the manager of the local radio station, Greenborne FM, he is well known in the village yet no one knows of his past.
- Laura Shavin as Rev. Maggie Roberts, the friendly vicar of the local church, who is offended if anyone mentions The Vicar of Dibley.

== Episodes ==
No.	Title	Written by	Original release date
1	"Episode 1"	Colin Brake	21 March 2021
2	"Episode 2"	Colin Brake	28 March 2021
3	"Episode 3"	Bev Doyle	4 April 2021
4	"Episode 4"	Bev Doyle	11 April 2021
5	"Episode 5"	Bev Doyle	18 April 2021
6	"Episode 6"	Colin Brake	25 April 2021
7	"Episode 7"	Bev Doyle	2 May 2021
8	"Episode 8"	Bev Doyle	9 May 2021
9	"Episode 9"	Angela Churm	16 May 2021
10	"Episode 10"	Angela Churm	23 May 2021
11	"Episode 11"	Colin Brake	30 May 2021
12	"Episode 12"	Colin Brake	6 June 2021

== Transmitting radio stations ==
The following is a list of radio stations that broadcast Greenborne.

- Alive Radio
- Apple FM
- Awaz FM
- Awaaz
- Bedford Radio
- Beyond Radio
- Black Country Radio
- Bolton FM
- BSR FM
- Canalside Radio
- Cando FM
- Carillon Wellbeing Radio
- CHBN Radio
- Chelmer Radio
- Corby Radio
- Crescent Radio
- Dean Radio
- Dover Community Radio
- Fuse FM
- Future Radio
- Hermitage FM
- Hope FM
- Hospital Radio Plymouth
- K107 FM
- Kennet Radio
- Koast Radio
- KTCR FM
- Link FM
- No Barriers Radio
- Oldham Community Radio
- Park Radio
- Phoenix Radio
- Radio Alty
- Radio Looe
- Radio Tyneside
- Radio Winchcombe
- River Radio
- Riviera FM
- Sine FM
- SJC Radio
- Smart Radio 101
- Somer Valley FM
- Steel FM
- Swindon 105.5
- Tameside Radio
- TMCR FM
- Tring Radio
- Vixen 101
- Winchester Radio
