= Big World Pictures =

American film production company

Big World Pictures is an American film production company based in Atlanta, GA. Founded in 2011 with the release of James Bickert's Dear God No. (2011) Big World specializes in independent films – particularly of the exploitation genre. As of July 2015, the company is filming the sequel to Dear God No titled Frankenstein Created Bikers with an anticipated release in 2016. Big World has selected a cast for the film which includes Laurence R. Harvey, Tristan Risk and Ellie Church and will shoot the entire movie on 35 mm film. On March 28, 2015, the company reached a milestone in a Kickstarter campaign successfully raising over $57,000 in crowd funding from nearly 800 backers to support the film's production.

== Additional References ==
- Mitchell Wells (February 23, 2015). "Big World Pictures To Shoot 'Frankenstein Created Bikers' On 35mm". Horror Society.
- Jason Thorson (February 25, 2015). "Big World Pictures to Shoot FRANKENSTEIN CREATED BIKERS on 35mm Film". Ravenous Monstor.
- Farmer Vincent (June 16, 2015). "FRANKENSTEIN CREATED BIKERS from Big World Pictures". Beneath the Underground.
- Marc Patterson (May 17, 2012). "Big World Pictures to release 'DEAR GOD NO!' DVD On June 5th". Brutal As Hell. Archived from the original on July 9, 2015.
- Ryan Turek (June 7, 2012). "Dear God No! Director Revs Up Frankenstein Created Bikers". Shock Till You Drop.
