= Corrinne Wicks =

English actress

- Born: Corrinne Eleanor Wicks
- Education: Webber Douglas Academy of Dramatic Art
- Occupation: Actress
- Years active: 1996–present
- Television: Doctors; Emmerdale
- Spouse: Tom Butcher (m. 2005)

Corrinne Eleanor Wicks is an English actress. After minor appearances in various British television series, she landed her first major role in 2000, as Helen Thompson in the BBC daytime soap opera Doctors. She remained in the role until 2005, after which she appeared in theatre productions, including The Importance of Being Earnest and The Holly and The Ivy. She then appeared as Ella Hart in the ITV soap opera Emmerdale from 2010 to 2011.

== Early and personal life ==
Born in Cheltenham, Gloucestershire, Wicks has mild dyslexia and OCD. She started her career in television as a casting assistant on such programmes as Prime Suspect, Dalziel and Pascoe and The Ruth Rendell Mysteries, before switching to an acting career. She then trained at the Webber Douglas Academy of Dramatic Art from 1996 to 1998.

Wicks married her Doctors co-star Tom Butcher in November 2005. They got married at Berrow Court in Edgbaston, a location where they had filmed together on Doctors. In 2010, she revealed that the pair did not like each other when they first began working together. However, after their on-screen characters got together romantically, it meant they worked more closely and began an off-screen relationship. Although happily married, Wicks did not live with her husband for the first seven years of marriage: he lived in London, while she continued to live at her home in Birmingham. She explained that she liked her home too much to move.

== Career ==
=== Television ===
Wicks began her career making minor appearances in various British television series. She was then cast as Helen Thompson in the BBC daytime soap opera Doctors. She was one of the original nine cast members on the medical soap and stayed in the role until 2005.

After leaving Doctors, Wicks also appeared in various series, including Murder Most Horrid, Harbour Lights, The Bill, Holby City, Grange Hill, Pig Heart Boy, Doc Martin and Life on Mars. She also appeared on the special charity "TV Medics" edition of The Weakest Link in December 2001, finishing in the final three. Wicks joined the regular cast of Emmerdale in November 2010 on a nine-month contract as Ella Hart, the ex-wife of Declan Macey (Jason Merrells). The character of Ella Hart gave Wicks the chance to be more provocative and flirtatious than many of her previous screen credits allowed. In June 2011, her ended and Wicks' character was written out of the programme when Stuart Blackburn took over as producer.

As well as playing her role in Emmerdale for ITV, Wicks acted in the BBC's adaptation of Nigel Slater's memoir Toast (January 2011); she played a young Nigel Slater's secondary school teacher. Wicks also had a guest role on Coronation Street in 2019 as gold digger Martine Skelton.

In 2021, Wicks had a regular role as pub landlady Beverley Godwin in the radio soap opera Greenborne opposite John Altman and Louise Jameson. Also in 2021, Wicks appeared alongside Colin Baker in the sci-fi film You Might Get Lost, a role for which she won Best Actress Awards at the Miami International Sci-Fi Film Festival and the Berlin International SciFi Film Festival. Then in 2022, she had a guest role in the Channel 4 soap opera Hollyoaks.

=== Theatre ===
Wicks' theatre acting credits include Trevor Nunn's production of Harold Pinter's Betrayal at the Royal National Theatre, Our Town, Attempts on Her Life, Six Degrees of Separation and Dinner with the Family. She completed a UK tour from 2007 to 2009 playing Gwendolyn in Oscar Wilde's The Importance of Being Earnest alongside her husband. Then from 2009 to 2010, Wicks toured the UK in The Holly and The Ivy, playing Margaret Gregory. In 2015, she again co-starred with her husband, this time in a touring production of The Ghost Train and in the Francis Durbridge play Murder with Love. Her other theatre work includes UK touring productions of The Devil at Midnight (2014), Stone Cold Murder (2015) Death Toll (2016) and Strictly Murder (2017).

== Filmography ==
=== Film ===
Year	Title	Role	Notes
2010	Toast	Secondary School Teacher	
2017	The Black Prince	Headmistress	
2021	You Might Get Lost	Arlene	
2023	The Apocalypse Box	Helena	
2024	The Waterhouse	Denice	
2024	Vexting	Mom	Short film
2026	Swan Song	Anne	Short film

=== Television ===
Year	Title	Role	Notes
1998	The Bill	Jan Lockett	Episode: "Team Spirit"
1999	Harbour Lights	Lycra Woman	Episode: "The Last Supper"
1999	Grange Hill	Karen	Episode: #22.18
1999	Murder Most Horrid	Harry's P.A.	Episode: "Elvis, Jesus and Zack"
1999	Holby City	Naomi	Episode: "Search for the Hero"
1999	Pig Heart Boy	TV Reporter	2 episodes
2000–2005	Doctors	Helen Thompson	Regular role
2005	Pizza	Big Sexy	Episode: "Small and Large Pizza"
2006	Holby City	Margaret Wrightman	2 episodes
2007	Life on Mars	Barrister	Episode: #2.7
2009	Holby City	Jemima Carr	Episode: "A Glass Half Full"
2009	The Londoners	Kate	2 episodes
2010–2011	Emmerdale	Ella Hart	Regular role
2013	Doc Martin	Radiologist	Episode: "Departure"
2019	Coronation Street	Martine Skelton	2 episodes
2022	Hollyoaks	Judge	Episode: #1.5854
2022	Pensive Moments	One	Episode: "Dialogue M"
2023	Dog Days	Felicity	Television film

=== Audio ===
Year	Title	Role	Notes
2019	I Robot	Andrea Ashe	Episode: "Liar"
2019	The Space Race	Commander Armstrong	
2020	The Avengers	Agent Harris	Episode: "White Heat"
2021	Greenborne	Beverley Godwin	Regular role
2022	Gallifrey	Lady Vibax / Gilla	2 episodes
2023	Doctor Who: The Third Doctor Adventures	Ms. Frost	1 episode
