= The Waterhouse =

- Directed by: Samuel Clemens
- Written by: Samuel Clemens
- Produced by: George Clemens; Samuel Clemens; Agam Jain; James Kermack; Julien Loeffler
- Starring: Alan Calton; Dominic Vulliamy; Michelangelo Fortuzzi; Lara Lemon; Sandrine Salyères; Lily Catalifo
- Cinematography: Fernando Ruiz
- Edited by: George Clemens
- Music by: Edward White
- Production companies: Take The Shot Films; Featuristic Films
- Release date: 27 October 2023 (FrightFest)
- Running time: 84 minutes
- Country: United Kingdom
- Language: English

The Waterhouse is a 2023 British horror thriller film written and directed by Samuel Clemens, starring Alan Calton, Dominic Vulliamy, Michelangelo Fortuzzi, Lara Lemon, Sandrine Salyères and Lily Catalifo. It was Clemens' feature debut.

== Cast ==
- Alan Calton as Eric
- Dominic Vulliamy as Matt
- Michelangelo Fortuzzi as Paul
- Lara Lemon as Opal
- Sandrine Salyères as Noé
- Lily Catalifo as Pixie
- Corrinne Wicks as Denice

== Release ==
The film premiered at FrightFest on 27 October 2023. The trailer was released in February 2024.

== Reception ==
Joseph Perry of Horror Fuel praised the "mesmerizing" sound design, the "captivating visuals" and the "satisfyingly eerie, enigmatic tone", as well as the "engaging" performances" and the "wonderfully imagined" characters.

Film critic Kim Newman called the film an "impressionist, elliptical take on the crooks-run-into-a-curse sub-genre – with impressive sound design, strangely cadenced performances and a kind of poetic free-flowing angst in lieu of conventional terrors."

Martin Unsworth of Starburst rated the film 4 stars out of 5 praised Clemens' direction and concluded that the film's "images and brooding sound design will linger long after the story is over, and the melding of myth and metaphysical will give fans plenty to debate."
