= Big Big World =

Big Big World may refer to:

- Big Big World (album), a 1998 album by Emilia Rydberg
  - "Big Big World" (song), the title song
- Big Big World (film), a 2016 Turkish film
- Big Big World (TV series), a travel TV series produced and broadcast by Hong Kong's TVB

== See also ==
- It's a Big Big World, a TV series which airs on PBS Kids
- Big World (disambiguation)
