= Begin Again (soundtrack) =

Begin Again (Music from and Inspired by the Original Motion Picture)

Soundtrack album by Various artists
- Released: July 1, 2014
- Studios: Electric Lady Studios (New York City); Danielle & Nick's Garden (New York City); Haimtown Studio (Texas City, Texas); The Green Building (Santa Monica, California)
- Genres: Pop; contemporary rock; R&B
- Length: 42:36; 55:00 (deluxe edition)
- Labels: ALXNDR; 222; Polydor; Interscope
- Producers: Gregg Alexander; John Carney (exec.); Danielle Brisebois; Nick Lashley; Nick Southwood; Rick Nowels; Glen Hansard

Singles from Begin Again (Music from and Inspired by the Original Motion Picture)
- 1. "Lost Stars" Released: June 23, 2014

Begin Again (Music from and Inspired by the Original Motion Picture) is the soundtrack album accompanying the 2013 film of the same name, released on July 1, 2014, by ALXNDR, 222 Records, Polydor Records and Interscope Records. The album consisted original songs written and composed by Gregg Alexander, Danielle Brisebois, Nick Lashley, Rick Nowels, and Nick Southwood, with Keira Knightley and Adam Levine performing most of the tracks, and other artists associated with the film, included Alexander's Cessyl Orchestra, CeeLo Green and Hailee Steinfeld. The song "Lost Stars" was released as a single from the album on June 23, to positive reception and was nominated for numerous awards, including the Academy Award for Best Original Song and the Broadcast Film Critics Association Award for Best Song. The track "Drowning Pool" by The Walls, which played over the opening credit sequence, is not included on the soundtrack album.

== Background ==
Begin Again marked Knightley's first singing role. Although she had never sung professionally before, she trained with a vocal coach to prepare for her role and also learnt to play a guitar. Speaking to Daily Mirror, Knightley said "I don't listen to a lot of music and one of the reasons I wanted to do the film was because it was a challenge and something completely different for me. The whole thing was out of my comfort zone... I'm not a singer and I didn't know how to do it." She had also contributed vocals for most of her songs in the soundtrack.

'Lost Stars,' more than any other song in the film, was the one where you wanted to get out a philosophy that Keira's character would sing but Adam would relate to and something that would also touch a contemporary audience. At the end of the film, it's a young audience watching this song that really has a lot of pathos and pain in it, but yet people are doing this

— Gregg Alexander

Being a fan of Carney's work, Alexander sent some of his compositions to Carney through email and MP3 until they officially met in London and discussed about the music. The script undergone multiple re-writes as the original songs had to be altered in order to seamlessly woven into the narrative. Alexander said it as "The way that the songs began didn't seem like there was a count off –one, two, three, four– there was no false sense of expectation because there was a big build up. It was like a car that just got started up and the next thing you know it's driving down the street at one hundred miles per hour."

Alexander was initially intended to write the original song, but instead after reading the screenplay, he felt so compelling, which resulted him to contribute to a body of work instead of an original song. While writing the track "Lost Stars" with Danielle Brisebois he felt that, "I was under the impression — or illusion — that the spirit of the characters were in me, hopefully to the point where I could write something they could sing without self-editing". His collaboration with other fellow songwriters, Nick Lashley and Nick Southwood helped him to complete the recordings of the soundtrack by 50 days, even before the film's shooting was set to begin in July 2012.

== Track listing ==
Begin Again (Music from and Inspired by the Original Motion Picture)
No.	Title	Writer(s)	Artist(s)	Length
1.	"Lost Stars (Dave's version)"	Gregg Alexander; Danielle Brisebois; Nick Lashley; Nick Southwood	Adam Levine	4:27
2.	"Tell Me If You Wanna Go Home"	Alexander; Lashley	Keira Knightley	3:39
3.	"No One Else Like You"	Alexander; Lashley	Levine	3:28
4.	"Horny"	Alexander; Rick Nowels	CeeLo Green	3:38
5.	"Lost Stars (Gretta's version)"	Alexander; Brisebois; Lashley; Southwood	Knightley	4:00
6.	"A Higher Place"	Alexander; Nowels	Adam Levine	3:12
7.	"Like a Fool"	John Carney	Knightley	2:27
8.	"Did It Ever Cross Your Mind (Demo Version)"	Alexander	Cessyl Orchestra	3:38
9.	"Women of the World (Go on Strike!)"	Alexander; Green; Nowels	Green	3:15
10.	"Coming Up Roses"	Glen Hansard; Brisebois	Knightley	3:13
11.	"Into the Trance"	Alexander	Cessyl	4:05
12.	"A Step You Can't Take Back"	Carney; Alexander; Brisebois	Knightley	3:25
Total length:				42:36

Begin Again (Music from and Inspired by the Original Motion Picture) – Deluxe edition
No.	Title	Writer(s)	Artist(s)	Length
13.	"Lost Stars (Into the Night Mix)"	Alexander; Brisebois; Lashley; Southwood	Levine	3:38
14.	"The Roof Is Broke (Demo Mix)"	Alexander	Cessyl	3:00
15.	"Tell Me If You Wanna Go Home (Roof Top Mix)"	Alexander; Lashley	Knightley; Hailee Steinfeld	3:27
16.	"Intimidated by You"	Alexander	Cessyl	2:28
Total length:				55:00

== Reception ==
Writing for Renowned for Sound, Helena Ho called it as "a great soundtrack that depicts the mood and premise of the film completely. Most of the songs on the album are easy listening, chiller tracks. The input of Cessyl Orchestra is a welcome change, as they bring a fuse of alternative rock with their electric guitar solos and dreamy harmonies. The soundtrack shows variety without straying too far from the heart of the films' message. Each song is performed with soul, proving that music isn't just about feeding a market; but really, it's an art form that can truly express one's emotions." Mint's Sanjukta Sharma called Alexander's music as "intoxicating Mitchellian graft". Mark Kermode of The Guardian, felt that "the songs are serviceable, if not spine-tingling".

Writing for Rappler, Paul John Caña said "Music is such an integral part of Carney's oeuvre that it's almost like its own character [...] Alexander composed many of the songs in the film, which should appeal to fans of acoustic guitar-driven music. The songs chuck the toothache-inducing, saccharine sweetness of bubblegum pop in favor of raw, honest, hey-that's-me-they're-singing-about reality. This is exactly what a film like Begin Again needs, and in this respect, it's already a winner. There is a feeling of discovering a new artist, and being treated to awesome new music, and for any true music fan, that's one of the best feelings in the world."

Richard Lawson of Vanity Fair wrote "The music, central as it is to the story, could have sunk the film had it had perhaps even the slightest whiff of contrivance or inauthenticity to it. Excitingly, most of it doesn't. The songs, written by New Radicals front man Gregg Alexander, with contributions from collaborators including Once star Glen Hansard and frequent Lykke Li and Lana del Rey songwriter Rick Nowels, are vaguely folky pop tunes that work credibly within the context of the film. And outside of it, too; I've found myself listening to one or two of the songs on YouTube since I saw the film. Certainly not as many times as I've listened to the beautiful “Falling Slowly” from Once, but it's still an admirable achievement that the songs from Begin Again stand on their own as well as they do." In contrast, Ann Hornaday of The Washington Post criticised the music as "twee, wispy and instantly forgettable", while The Oregonian's called it as "pleasant, but nothing special".

== Accolades ==
The song "Lost Stars" received nominations under the Best Original Song category at the 87th Academy Awards and 20th Critics' Choice Awards, but lost both the awards to "Glory", sung by Common and John Legend for Selma. However at the inaugural edition of Hollywood Music in Media Awards, it won the Best Original Song in a Feature Film, and also received nomination for Best Soundtrack Album, losing to Guardians of the Galaxy. At the 2014 St. Louis Film Critics Association, the soundtrack received a nomination under the same category, also losing to Guardians of the Galaxy. At the Guild of Music Supervisors Awards, it won Best Music Supervision for Films Budgeted Under $10 Million for the supervisors Matthew Sullivan and Andrea von Foerster.

== Charts ==
=== Weekly charts ===
Chart (2014)	Peak position
Australian Albums (ARIA)	35
Belgian Albums (Ultratop Flanders)	181
Belgian Albums (Ultratop Wallonia)	84
Danish Albums (Hitlisten)	15
French Albums (SNEP)	55
South Korean Albums (Circle)	4
South Korean International Albums (Circle)	1
New Zealand Albums (RMNZ)	25
Spanish Albums (Promusicae)	11

=== Year-end charts ===
Chart (2014)	Position
US Soundtrack Albums (Billboard)	14
Chart (2015)	Position
US Soundtrack Albums (Billboard)	20

== Personnel ==
Credits adapted from CD liner notes.

- Backing vocals – Alfredo Scotti, Danielle Brisebois, Gregg Alexander, Keira Knightley
- Bass – Brad Albetta, Conrad Korsch, John Pierce, Nick Lashley
- Drums – Blair Sinta, Matt Laug, Ray Rizzo, Shawn Pelton
- Electric piano – Thomas Bartlett
- Guitar – Gregg Alexander, John Carney, Nick Lashley, Rusty Anderson
- Keyboards – Charlie Judge, Mitch Kaplan, Nick Lashley, Paul Gordon
- Piano – Charlie Judge, Deron Johnson, John Carney, Nick Lashley, Paul Gordon
- Strings – Joyce Hamman, Mary Wooten, Sandra Park

Technical

- Producer – Gregg Alexander
- Programming – Nick Lashley, Nick Southwood
- Arrangements – Lester Barnes
- Engineer – Alfredo Scotti, Nick Lashley, Patrick Dillett, Pete Bishoff, Stewart Lerman, Avril Mackintosh, Chris Garcia, Danielle Brisebois, Graham Marsh
- Mixed by Ash Howes, Gregg Droman, Kieron Menzies, Michael Brauer
- Mastered by Joe LaPorta
- Music co-ordinator – Lauren Fenner, Roslyn Tarroza, Kim Lumpkin
