= Jocasta (band) =

Jocasta were a Britpop band formed in London in 1994. They had two minor hit singles and released one album before splitting up in the late 1990s.

== History ==
The band comprised Tim Arnold (vocals, guitar and piano), Jack Reynolds (lead guitar), Adrian Meehan (drums) and Andy Lewis (bass guitar). Arnold and Reynolds had attended school together. In 1994 they met up again in Soho where they both worked. Arnold worked as a chef by day and a doorman by night in an illegal drinking bar.

By 1995, Jocasta had signed a worldwide record deal with Sony via Sony LRD. Jocasta's management set up their own label, V4 records and were distributed by Sony for their first two singles "Go" and "Change Me". In early 1996, Sony moved them over to Epic Records to be looked after by the head of the company, Rob Stringer.

Epic released the single "Something to Say" and upon poor sales, decided to re-release the band's previous singles. At the start of 1997, "Go" was 'A listed' by BBC Radio One and championed by Jo Whiley as 'single of the week'. It also featured on TV shows, including the BBC Saturday morning show Live and Kicking and ITV's Videotech. After a short European tour, Epic re-released "Change Me" which became Mark Radcliffe's single of the week, again at Radio One. The reissues of "Go" and "Change Me" both placed on the UK Singles Chart.

The debut album, No Coincidence, released in June 1997, was recorded with the London Symphony Orchestra. Sony terminated the contract on the day the album was released. The band split up after the album's release, with Arnold going on to record as a solo artist.

== Discography ==
=== Albums ===
- No Coincidence (1997), Epic

1. "Laughing"
2. "Go"
3. "Life In A Day"
4. "Change Me"
5. "Actress"
6. "Leave The Light On"
7. "Something To Say"
8. "Single As Hell"
9. "Perfect"
10. "Face You"
11. "Crackbaby"
12. "Inside Out"

=== Singles ===
- "Go" (1996), V4
- "Change Me" (1996), V4
- "Something to Say" (1996), Epic
- "Go" (1997), Epic - UK No. 50
- "Change Me" (1997), Epic - UK No. 60
