= Stevie McCrorie =

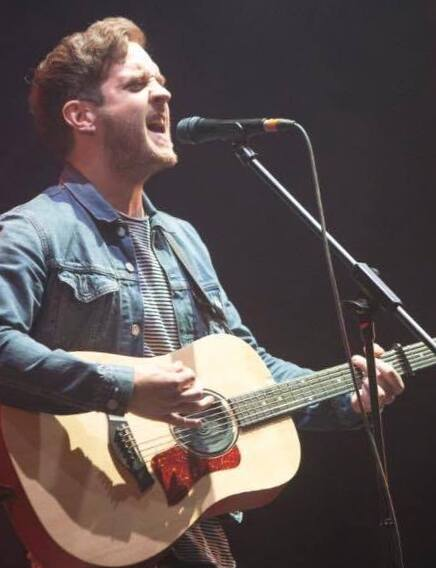
- McCrorie performing at T in the Park 2015

Background information
- Born: 23 March 1985 (age 41); Stirling, Scotland
- Genres: Pop; alternative rock; pop rock
- Occupations: Singer; songwriter; firefighter
- Instruments: Vocals; guitar
- Years active: 2010–present
- Labels: Decca; Universal
- Website: steviemccrorie.net

Stevie McCrorie (born 23 March 1985) is a Scottish singer-songwriter, best known as the winner of the fourth series of the BBC television singing competition The Voice UK in 2015. He auditioned with Kodaline's "All I Want", with all four coaches turning their chairs for him. His debut single, "Lost Stars", was released the day following his win, peaking at number one on the Scottish Singles Chart and number six on the UK Singles Chart.

In November 2015, he released "My Heart Never Lies" as the lead single from his second album, and first major label album, Big World, which reached number four on the Scottish Albums Chart and number thirty-five on the UK Albums Chart. McCrorie and his record label parted company soon thereafter. As of 2019, McCrorie is the most successful artist to emerge victorious from The Voice UK. His winners single, "Lost Stars" is currently the highest charting and best-selling single in the United Kingdom from a The Voice UK winner, charting at number six on the UK Singles Chart and selling 62,000 copies.

== Background ==
Stevie McCrorie was born in Stirling and spent his formative years in Denny, Falkirk. He attended St Modan's High School, Stirling. When entering The Voice UK in 2015 he was a firefighter of the Scottish Fire and Rescue Service.

== Career ==
=== The Voice UK (2015) ===
In 2015, McCrorie auditioned for the fourth series of The Voice UK performing Kodaline's "All I Want", with all four coaches turning for him. He eventually chose to join Ricky Wilson's team. During the battle rounds, he battled Tim Arnold singing Imagine Dragons' "Demons", and McCrorie won the Battle. During the Knockout Rounds, McCrorie performed U2's "I Still Haven't Found What I'm Looking For". McCrorie was then through to the live shows. During the first live show, he performed Cyndi Lauper's "All Through the Night". McCrorie received the Team Ricky "fast pass" and was saved. The other Team Ricky artists were Emmanuel Nwamadi, who advanced to the next live show via the public vote and Autumn Sharif, who did not advance to the second live show. During the second live show, McCrorie performed Leona Lewis' "Bleeding Love" and advanced to the Live Final along with teammate Nwamadi. During the live final, he performed "I'll Stand By You", "Get Back", "All I Want" and the winner's single "Lost Stars". On 4 April 2015 on the live show, it was announced that McCrorie was the winner of The Voice UK 2015. He had beaten the only other remaining contestant, opera singer Lucy O'Byrne. He was nicknamed "The Hero" during the competition.

==== Performances ====
Performances
Performed	Song	Original artist	Result
Blind audition	"All I Want"	Kodaline	Joined Team Ricky
Battle round	"Demons" (against Tim Arnold)	Imagine Dragons	Winner
Knockout round	"I Still Haven't Found What I'm Looking For"	U2	Through to live shows
Week 1	"All Through the Night"	Cyndi Lauper	Saved (fast pass)
Week 2	"Bleeding Love"	Leona Lewis	Advanced
Week 2	"Stay with Me" (with Ricky Wilson and Emmanuel Nwamadi)	Faces	Advanced
Live Final	"I'll Stand By You"	The Pretenders	Winner
Live Final	"Get Back" (with Ricky Wilson)	The Beatles and Billy Preston	Winner
Live Final	"All I Want"	Kodaline	Winner
Live Final	"Lost Stars"	Adam Levine	Winner

=== Decca and Big World (2015–2016) ===
On 5 April 2015, the day after he won the show, McCrorie released his winner's single, a cover of "Lost Stars", written by Gregg Alexander, Danielle Brisebois, Nick Lashley and Nck Southwood, via digital download. The song reached number 1 in his native Scotland and six in the UK. His second single, "My Heart Never Lies" was released in November 2015 along with an accompanying music video. It reached number 51 on the Scottish Singles Chart. His first album since winning The Voice UK, Big World, was released on 8 January 2016. The album reached number four in Scotland number 35 on the UK Albums Chart. To promote the album, he made an appearance on The Voice in 2016 on the first live shows, and performed "My Heart Never Lies", which was released as the lead and only single from the album. Following the performance on The Voice UK, the album re-entered the Scottish Albums Chart at number 15 and UK Albums Chart at number 70, while "My Heart Never Lies" re-entered at a new peak of 45 on the Scottish Singles Chart.

=== Label change and Days Like These (2016–) ===
In April 2016, McCrorie and music PR company APB parted ways and he returned to his former career as a firefighter. In August 2016, McCrorie announced via Facebook that his contract with Decca Records had expired. McCrorie revealed to Radio Times in April 2017 that he is still pursuing a career in music as an independent artist and continues to write songs and perform live. In December 2017, McCrorie released a 3-track EP independently and an accompanying music video for the song "I Am Alive", which subsequently entered the official Scottish charts at number 69.

On 27 December 2019, McCrorie released an extended play, Days Like These, via his own independent record label. The extended play featured five songs, including versions of "I Still Haven't Found What I'm Looking For" by U2 and "Dreams" by Fleetwood Mac.

== Personal life ==
McCrorie is married to Amy Laverty McCrorie and they have two daughters, Bibi and Sunny. He has three siblings, Michael, Paul and sister Nadia. He is also a firefighter for the Scottish Fire and Rescue Service.

== Discography ==
=== Albums ===
Title	Details	Peak chart positions		
Title	Details	UK	SCO	UK Indie
These Old Traditions	Released: 4 April 2010; Label: Self-released; Formats: Digital download, CD	—	—	48
Big World	Released: 8 January 2016; Label: Decca Records; Formats: Digital download, CD	35	4	—
Days Like These	Released: 27 December 2019; Label: Stevie McCrorie; Formats: Digital download, CD	—	—	—

=== Singles ===
Year	Title	Peak chart positions			Album
Year	Title	UK	SCO	IRE	Album
2010	"Wolves / Rainbows"	—	—	—	Non-album singles
2011	"Light"	—	—	—	Non-album singles
2015	"Lost Stars"	6	1	87	Non-album singles
2015	"My Heart Never Lies"	—	45	—	Big World
2017	"I Am Alive"	—	69	—	Non-album singles
2018	"All I Want"	—	35	—	Non-album singles
"—" denotes a single that did not chart or was not released.
