= Tim Arnold (musician) =

English musician, composer, performance artist (born 1975)

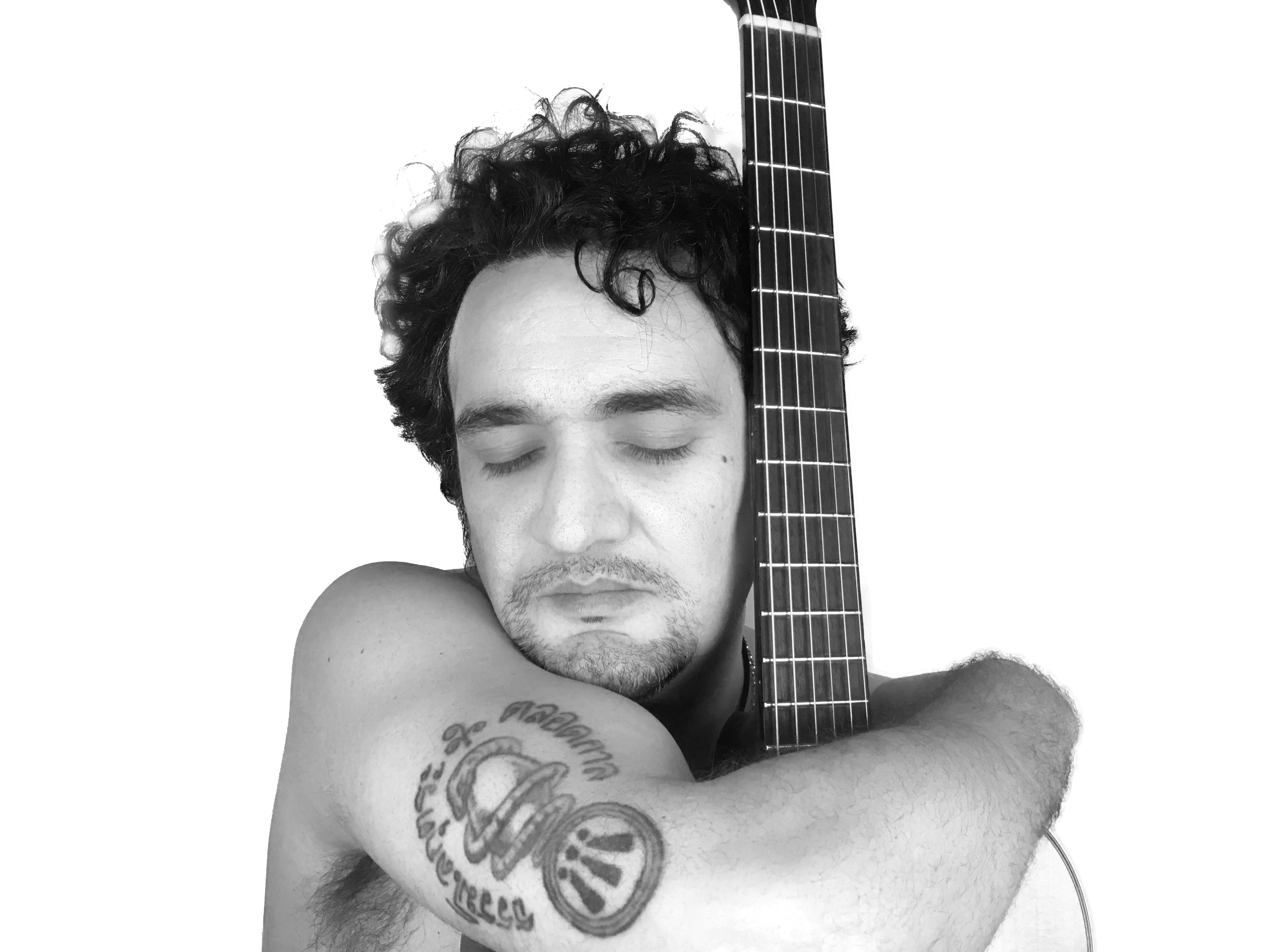
- I Am For You album cover art, 2017

Background information
- Also known as: The Soho Hobo
- Born: Timothy Marcus Arnold; 3 July 1975 (age 51); Soho, London, England
- Origin: London, England
- Genres: art rock, Alternative rock, indie rock, classical, new-age, pop, progressive rock, rock and roll, theatre
- Occupations: Musician, songwriter, singer, composer, record producer
- Instruments: Vocals, guitar, keyboards, percussion, bass, piano, organ, glockenspiel, mandolin
- Years active: 1995–present
- Labels: V4 Records, Epic, Sajja Records, TA Music
- Formerly of: Jocasta
- Website: Tim Arnold's official website Super Connected website

Timothy Marcus Arnold (born 3 July 1975) is an English singer, songwriter, musician, performance artist, composer, producer, and film director from London. His music has been compared to David Bowie and he is the last musician to collaborate with David Bowie and Kate Bush mentor Lindsay Kemp. Arnold is the creator of critically acclaimed multimedia album, film and theatre project Super Connected. He first achieved success as the singer and songwriter of Britpop band Jocasta in the mid-1990s. He runs the record label TA Music, and has released 32 albums.

As a film composer, Arnold created original music for Iggy Pop in the 2016 feature film Blood Orange. He authored and composed the musical Secrets of Soho. and won the BBC Radio London Album of the Year for his album The Soho Hobo.

He is also an active campaigner for the preservation of the London district known as Soho and its role in the enhancement of the performing arts. He is the founder of Save Soho, a coalition of performers including Stephen Fry and Benedict Cumberbatch, residents and politicians that came together out of concern for the future of Soho's historic role as a national platform for the performing arts.

He has been critical of Spotify, after removing his discography from the streaming service in December 2021 in protest of the company's investment in a military defence company. At the end of 2025, according to his official website, Arnold ended his public online record in what was described as a "Digital Departure".

== Early life ==
Arnold's childhood was spent travelling through Europe, as his mother, Polly Perkins, performed cabaret in theatres and nightclubs. Between the ages of eight and fourteen, he lived in France, Spain and the UK.

Arnold has stated he believes in magic after meeting a Pagan "witch" at the age of nine.

At fourteen years of age, he enrolled as a bard in The Order of Bards, Ovates and Druids. The teachings inspired him to leave his mother's home in Spain and return alone to England to study at the Rudolf Steiner School, where he formed the band Jocasta with best friend Jack Reynolds.

== Career ==
=== Jocasta ===
In 1994, Arnold and the band moved from Hertfordshire to London. Jocasta had chart hits with "Go" and "Change Me" in 1997. The band's only album, No Coincidence, was released in June 1997, but they disbanded soon after its release.

=== Solo career ===
==== Shakespeare's Globe (1998–1999) ====
In 1999, he signed a publishing deal with V2 Music, and also became Master of Music at Shakespeare's Globe Theatre, composing original music for Peter Oswald's Augustine's Oak, a new verse play written especially for the Globe.

==== Universal Music (2000–2003) ====
In 2000, his new band called Spearshaker recorded several songs at Rockfield Studios in Monmouth, Wales, which would later be released on Arnold's solo album En Route. In 2001, Arnold left V2 and signed to Universal Music Publishing. For two years, he wrote and produced music for newly signed artists at Universal, mostly pop, R&B, garage and hip hop.

==== Thailand (2003–2004) ====
In 2003, Arnold travelled to the Wat Tham Krabok Buddhist monastery in Thailand, where he was successfully treated for drug addiction. Life at the monastery had a profound effect on Arnold who subsequently left London and moved to Thailand to live in the monastery, where the monks built him a recording studio.

He recorded his debut solo album Lokutara with the monks who cured him, in which the music was created by following cracks in the earth, which metamorphosed into pop rock melodies.

==== Soho Years – Part One (2004–2009) ====
A Tham Krabok success story, Arnold returned to the UK in 2004. Over the following 18 months, he recorded and released 6 solo albums, including Secrets of Soho recorded in Francis Bacon's spiritual home (The Colony Room).

==== Sonnet 155 (2008–2010) ====
Arnold embarked on his 11th solo album Sonnet 155 by writing over 30 letters to Shakespearean actors, including Ian McKellen, Derek Jacobi, Pete Postlethwaite, Richard Briers, Janet Suzman and Emma Thompson in the hope that they would provide further inspiration and help turn ideas into songs. The responses he received became the basis for many of Arnold's songs. The album is a rock/classical crossover all driven by Shakespearean themes.

Sonnet 155 previewed to standing ovations at the Almeida Theatre, London (2 and 9 May 2010), a cross-media performance, including contributions from actors Richard Briers, Paul McGann, Benedict Cumberbatch and Lisa Dillon. The album also re-interprets classical pieces of music by Mozart, Rimsky-Korsakov and Michael Nyman – each song a contemporary response to a Shakespearean theme.

==== Soho Years – Part Two (2010–2015) ====
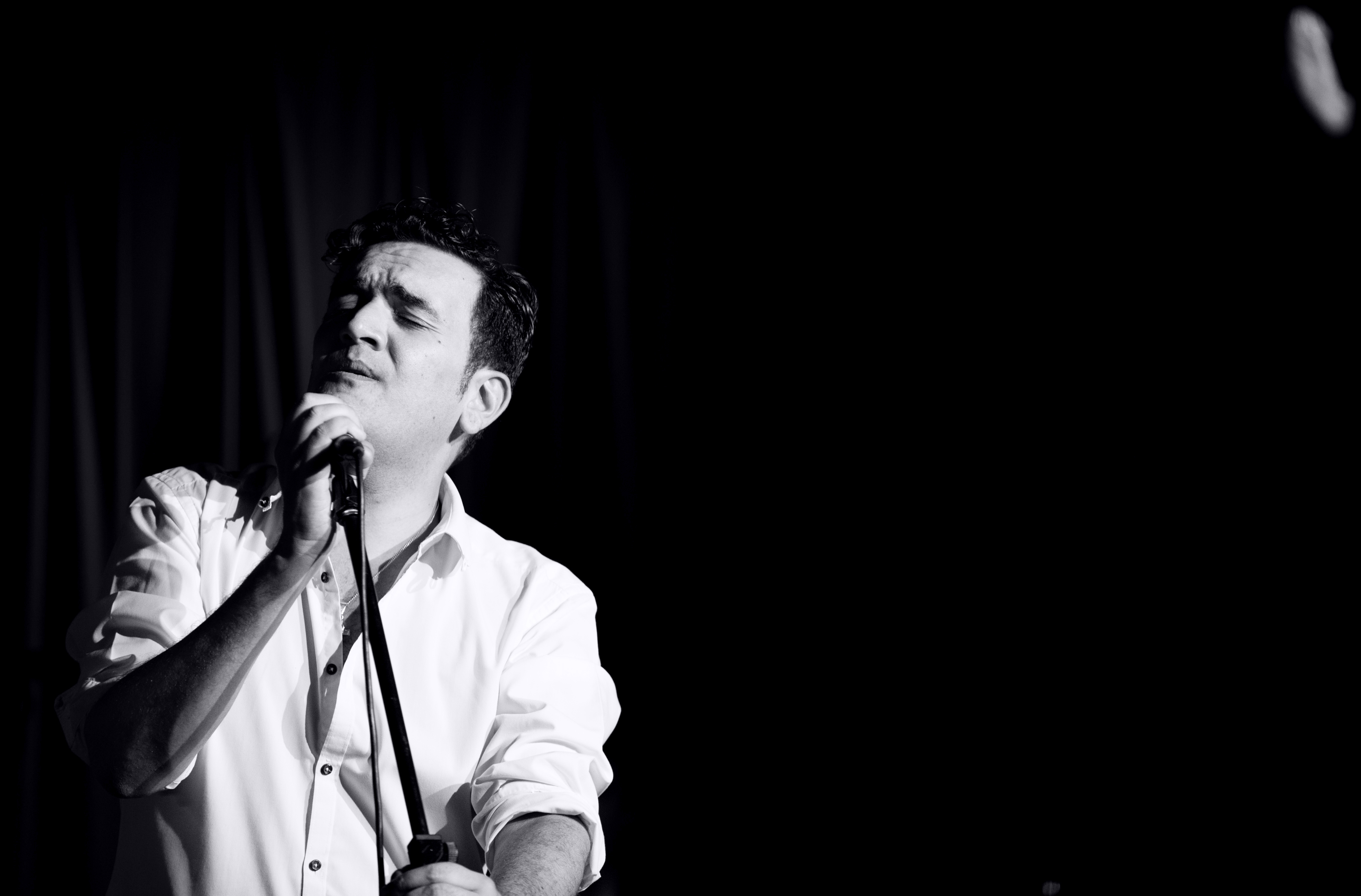
Arnold live at Soho Theatre, London, 2012.

In 2012, Arnold began performing new songs under the name The Soho Hobo. He performed several shows at The Soho Theatre, The Groucho Club and The Lexington with actors Jessie Wallace, Gary Kemp and Phil Daniels throughout 2012 and 2013 as showcases for his forthcoming album about Soho.

In 2015 he gave the Mayor of London, Boris Johnson a guided tour of Soho as part of Arnold's Save Soho campaign. The pair were filmed by ITV News singing a duet of Arnold's song "Don't Go Changing Soho".

In 2015, he also appeared on The Voice and after auditioning, was selected by Ricky Wilson. By the second round, he was out of the competition losing his battle against eventual winner Stevie McCrorie. Arnold later stated that the executive producer of The Voice had in fact asked him to be on the show, Arnold adding that he didn't realise The Voice was scripted.

He released a single 'Hearts 4 Meat' in support of the Save Soho campaign that he leads with Stephen Fry and Benedict Cumberbatch. The song was inspired by Caitlin Moran's article in The Times 'Where is London If Soho Is Gone?'. In July 2015, Arnold released his 14th album The Soho Hobo

==== Post-Soho Releases (2015–2020) ====
In 2016, Arnold produced and released music for Iggy Pop's film Blood Orange. Iggy supported the release, telling NME: "It could have been an outtake from 'Kind of Blue' by Miles Davis, or maybe side two of 'Low' by Bowie and Brian Eno. I thought it was a real nice theme, effective for the film."

in 2017, Arnold began working with dancer and mime artist Lindsay Kemp on the music video for Arnold's song "Change" from the album I Am For You, which featured in Arnold's retrospective show at London's Roundhouse the same year. The pair subsequently went on to create an immersive multimedia community event of Arnold's song "What Love Would Want" at Manchester's Bridgewater Hall in 2018. The event ended with a bouquet of flowers brought on stage, sent from Kate Bush to Tim and Lindsay.

In 2017, Arnold also began his trilogy of classical albums 'Sounds To Pictures' in collaboration with violinist Jonathan Hill, with the third in the album series 'Constellations' released in February 2020, featuring dream-inspired artwork from actress and dream researcher Kate Alderton.

In 2019, Arnold wrote and released "Don't Go Changing Soho", a Christmas tribute single to the area featuring vocals from Marc Almond, Boy George, Chrissie Hynde, Marty Wilde, Glen Matlock, Polly Perkins, Mari Wilson, Emily Capell, and Gary Kemp.

==== Lockdown Releases (2020–2022) ====
In 2020, Arnold began work on his first lockdown album When Staying Alive's The Latest Craze which included the community collaborative video for song "Another Record That Changed My life". In August 2020, on the steps of St George's Hall, Liverpool, he joined the city's protest to give NHS staff a pay rise by performing his protest song 'Change of System' in which he sings the names of, and commemorates the NHS workers who died at the start of the 2020 pandemic.

Author John Higgs noted that "The effect is like listening to a soundtrack album and realising with shock that it is the soundtrack to your own life."

Arnold also began a series of socially distanced live shows in London from his back garden called "Salon No.9" that were recorded and later released as a live album Tales From The Tracks.

In 2021, Arnold composed the theme music for BBC Radio 4 audio drama Barred and radio soap opera Greenborne.

==== Super Connected (2022–2025) ====
In May 2022, Arnold staged an R & D live multimedia performance of his album and silent film Super Connected in London's first sustainable community market, Mercato Metropolitano at new venue, The Temple of Art and Music. The official live show launched a year later at the Roundhouse studio theatre in London to coincide with the release of the album.

==== Digital Departure (2025) ====
In November 2025, Arnold announced what he called a "Digital Departure", marking the end of his public online presence. The announcement coincided with his Super Connected performance at Edinburgh's Pleasance Theatre, described as the live marker of his departure from digital platforms. His UK Government petition advocating for parental choice over children's digital exposure reached 10,000 signatures, qualifying for an official government response, and received support from public figures including Olivia Colman, Stephen Fry, Chrissie Hynde, and Kevin Godley.

== Personal life ==
Arnold lives in London and was listed to represent Soho in Historic England's 2016 exhibition I Am London. He is a feminist and a lifelong vegetarian. Arnold is on the autism spectrum and has attention deficit hyperactivity disorder, and was diagnosed with autism in 2022, describing his music as an "autistic pursuit of balance and inner harmony that sometimes looks like art".

== Activism ==
=== Super Connected ===
Arnold is an advocate for addressing digital dependency and its effects on families, petitioning the Mayor of London in 2024, to meet with Health Professionals for Safer Screens to discuss digital norms for children. Arnold's Super Connected project explores the impact of screen addiction, particularly in the context of family dynamics and mental health. Through the record-cum-film-theatre piece, Super Connected encourages families to reconsider their relationship with technology and focuses on meaningful, offline connections. The live events include a PhoneFreeze ritual, inviting audiences to experience digital disconnection and raise awareness about the pressures of living in a technology-driven world.

Described as "the man behind the drama that predicted the smartphone crisis, Arnold has spoken publicly about living without a smartphone since 2023, describing it as part of his commitment to real-world connection and digital balance, themes central to Super Connected.

In 2025, Super Connected evolved into a UK Government petition advocating for parents to have greater choice over their children's use of digital technology in schools. The petition received public support from Midge Ure, Imelda Staunton, Olivia Colman and a number of teachers and health professionals.

=== What Love Would Want ===
While Arnold identifies his sexual orientation as straight, he has said in interviews that he comes from an LGBT background, being brought up by two women since birth, with an extended family of gay women and men.

This distinction in Arnold's upbringing became the subject of media attention in 2017 surrounding the release of his song and video 'What Love Would Want'. Described by Fused Magazine as "A response to the divisive and for some, frightening times we are living in", Arnold's song was inspired by Emma Watson's speech on The United Nations's He For She Campaign and Stephen Fry's speech on the Catholic Church's condemnation of gay people.

The song's video was published on 17 May 2017 to mark International Day Against Homophobia, Transphobia and Biphobia (IDAHOT). Arnold supported the event with a series of live performances in Toronto on the day, complete with a cruise boat choir performance on Lake Ontario. "What Love Would Want" is one of the first songs to premiere via Blockchain technology with Canadian company Musicoin, the world's first smart cryptocurrency for music securing exclusive release of the song before its general release.

Actor Stephen Fry supported the song's message with an appearance in Arnold's video. Arnold subsequently went on to support and work with Amnesty International at live events across the United Kingdom throughout 2017, including the petition hand-in at the Russian Embassy in London in protest of Chechnya's gay purge, where Arnold performed the song alongside campaigners Sir Ian McKellen, Peter Tatchell and Sir Michael Cashman. Appearances at the Isle of Wight Festival with Human Rights activist Shane Enright and a performance at the Isle of Wight's inaugural Pride Festival and Hastings Pride were instigated by Arnold to promote Amnesty's Love Is A Human Right campaign. Arnold's "What Love Would Want" has since become an ongoing multi-media project to promote love and diversity.

== Soho ==
As founder and leader of the Save Soho group, Arnold succeeded in saving iconic venue Madame Jojo's and stopped Transport for London from closing Soho Square to make way for a work depot in the construction of Crossrail 2, as documented in his 2020 feature-length documentary Soho Is...

== Dreaming ==
In 2020, Arnold embarked on his 19th solo album Constellations, conceived with independent dream researcher Kate Alderton, in an exploration of the relationship between music, dreams and art. Arnold and Alderton trained with The Centre for Social Dreaming in Amsterdam and held seven Social Dreaming matrices hosted by The Cockpit Theatre in London. Their work together featured in the 'Independent Association for the Study of Dreams' Spring edition of Dreamtime magazine.

== Album discography ==
- Jocasta – No Coincidence (1997)
- Seeker's Serum (1998)
- Lokutara (2004)
- En Route (2005)
- Secrets of Soho (2006)
- Soho Confidential (2006)
- Hijo de la Luna (2007)
- Clever Ain't Wise (2007)
- Another World (2007)
- Restrung (2007)
- Oaky Dokey (2009)
- Sonnet 155 (2010)
- Augustine's Oak (2011)
- The Soho Hobo (2015)
- Sounds To Pictures, Volume One: Conversations (2017)
- I Am For You (2017)
- Sounds To Pictures, Volume Two: Inspirations (2018)
- You Are For Me (2018)
- Vivaldi – The Four Seasons with Jonathan Hill (2019)
- Sounds To Pictures, Volume Three: Constellations (2020)
- Jocasta – Ideas Are Bulletproof (2020)
- When Staying Alive's The Latest Craze (2020)
- Tales From The Tracks (2021)
- Maybe Magic (2022)
- The Jocasta 4-Track Demos (1992–1997) Vol 1 (2022)
- Super Connected (2023)
- Super Connected Live at Quay Arts, Isle of Wight (2024)
- Super Connected Live at The Florrie, Liverpool (2024)
- Super Connected Live at Ironworks Studios, Brighton (2024)
- Super Connected Live at Chapel Arts Centre, Bath (2024)
- Super Connected Live at South Street Arts, Reading (2024)
- Super Connected Live at The Cockpit Theatre, London (2024)
- Send More Light - Versions (2024)
