= My Heart Never Lies =

Single by Stevie McCrorie

from the album Big World
- Released: November 13, 2015
- Genre: Acoustic, folk, rock
- Length: 3:12
- Label: Decca
- Songwriter: Stevie McCrorie

Stevie McCrorie singles chronology
"Lost Stars" (2015)	"My Heart Never Lies" (2015)	"I Am Alive" (2017)

"My Heart Never Lies" is a 2015 single released by Scottish singer Stevie McCrorie, released as the lead and only single from his debut studio album Big World (2016). Written by McCrorie, it was released following the release of his first major–label single release "Lost Stars" which was released earlier in the year following his victory on the TV talent show The Voice UK.

== Background and release ==
"My Heart Never Lies" was described as "the perfect introduction to Stevie’s own style – heartfelt and honest and demanding of repeat listening". York Press highlighted the song as a standout track from the album. Lyrically, McCrorie said the song is about "being away from my daughter, however it doesn't mention a kid, so it can relate to anybody leaving home".

The single release was further promoted by a number of promotional appearances on British daytime television programmes. Following the announcement of the single, McCrorie performed a "special" pop-up gig at the Hard Rock Cafe in Glasgow, and said that "this week is very special, its something I have thought about for weeks and months". "My Heart Never Lies" debuted on the Scottish Singles Charts at number fifty one in November 2015, before reaching a peak of number forty-five on the Scottish Singles Chart. As part of the singles promotion, McCrorie performed the song on BBC Scotland's coverage of Children in Need on 14 November 2015 from Glasgow.

To promote the release of his album Big World, McCrorie made an appearance on The Voice in 2016 on the first live shows, and performed "My Heart Never Lies". Following the performance, Big World re-entered the Scottish Albums Chart at number 15 and UK Albums Chart at number 70.

== Track listing ==
1. "My Heart Never Lies" – 3:12

== Charts ==
Chart (2015)	Peak position
Scotland Singles (OCC)	45

== Release history ==
Country	Release date	Format	Label
United Kingdom	13 November 2015	Digital download	Decca
