= T in the Park 2015 =

Music festival in Scotland

T in the Park
- Dates: 10–13 July 2015
- Locations: Strathallan Castle, Perthshire
- Years active: 1994–2016
- Website: https://tinthepark.com/

T in the Park 2015 was a three-day music festival which took place between 10–13 July 2015 and was held at Strathallan Castle for the first time, which is 20 miles away from its previous location at the disused Balado airfield, Kinross-shire. It hit the news on several occasions including when supporters of the event said that the generation of income outweighed any local concerns about the impact on local wildlife, one man died, another man was assaulted with a bottle, and traffic control was chaotic.

== New location ==
In 2014, plans were drawn up to allow the festival to be relocated to Strathallan Castle. This was due to a section of the festival grounds at Balado being situated over the Forties pipeline causing the Health and Safety Executive (HSE) to request for the festival to be relocated away from its previous site at Balado. According to HSE, an accident could result in a large number of casualties and people receiving a dangerous dose of thermal radiation.

Ever since the announcement, concerns have been raised about the new location. A couple tried to take legal action against the move. A group of residents set up the Strathallan T Action Group (STAG) to highlights its concern. Full planning permission became required for the switch from Balado. Two public consultations were held as a result. One of the biggest concerns was the traffic management. Yorkshire-based traffic management experts SEP Ltd. were brought in to help resolve the issues. An SEP spokesman said:

There is a scientific calculation of network capacity and flow rates that can be applied to the road network being used by the event. A desktop modelling exercise has been performed and it was successful. We are confident of our plans and are extremely experienced in managing traffic plans in rural areas. Road safety is of the utmost importance to us and consideration is being given to this. Speed reductions will be in place on certain key roads around the event, as well as other measures.

In February 2015, a pair of ospreys returned to their long-term roost despite attempts to usher them to a new custom-built nest. It is understood that the ospreys' return to their former home means a buffer zone of 2500 ft will likely be required to safeguard them during the three-day festival encroaching significantly on the proposed festival site. A spokesman for RSPB Scotland said the wildlife organisation was "fully satisfied" the birds had returned to the old nest. This was disputed and the police were called after DF Concerts tried to divert the birds to the new nest by using balloons, flags, and a cherry picker which RSPB Scotland condemned as unethical and unacceptable, although not illegal. James Reynolds of RSPB Scotland said: "We are aware that the ospreys have been reported at the nest site and indeed we have some video footage that shows one of them alighting on the nest with a stick". A T in the Park spokeswoman denied any wrongdoing. Shortly after the event RSPB Scotland stated the Strathallan Estate's ospreys were fine A spokesman said: “The ospreys were closely monitored over the weekend and both adult birds are still present at the nest site with their chicks, and behaving normally.

The event was finally approved in May despite 1,600 letters of objection sent to Perth and Kinross council.

== Line-up ==
The first headline act to be announced were The Libertines and shortly after other headliners Kasabian and Noel Gallagher's High Flying Birds, along with other acts including Jessie J, Avicii, Hozier, Sam Smith, The Vaccines, and Twin Atlantic.

The Scottish Sun Signing Tent
Friday 10 July	Saturday 11 July	Sunday 12 July
Slaves; The Wombats; Sigma	The LaFontaines; The Strypes; Jack Savoretti; Stevie McCrorie	Catfish and the Bottlemen; Peace; James Bay; The View; Kodaline

Main Stage
Friday 10 July	Saturday 11 July	Sunday 12 July
Kasabian; 22:20–23:50; Sam Smith; 20:40–21:40; Rudimental; 19:15–20:10; Hozier; 17:55–18:45; Annie Mac; 16:40–17:25; The Wombats; 15:30–16:10; The Cribs; 14:25–15:00; Prides; 13:30–14:00	Avicii; 22:30–23:50; The Libertines; 20:30–21:50; The Script; 19:00–20:00; George Ezra; 17:40–18:30; Jessie J 16:25–17:10; Labrinth; 15:10–15:55; Seasick Steve; 14:00–14:40; Lawson; 13:05–13:35; The LaFontaines; 12:10–12:40	Noel Gallagher's High Flying Birds; 21:20–22:50; Stereophonics; 19:30–20:45; Paloma Faith; 18:10–19:00; Alabama Shakes; 16:50–17:40; James Bay; 15:35–16:20; The View; 14:25–15:05; Ella Eyre; 13:25–14:05; The Parsonage Choir; 12:30–13:00

BBC Three/ Radio 1 Stage
Friday 10 July	Saturday 11 July	Sunday 12 July
David Guetta; 22:35–23:50; The War on Drugs; 20:50–21:55; Afrojack; 19:20–20:20; Gorgon City; 18:00–18:50; Sigma; 16:40–17:30; Fuse ODG; 15:30–16:10; Slaves; 14:30–15:30; Lower Than Atlantis; 13:30–14:05	Twin Atlantic; 23:35–00:50; Alt-J; 21:55–22:55; The Vaccines; 20:25–21:25; Enter Shikari; 18:55–19:55; Years & Years; 17:35–18:25; Charli XCX; 16:20–17:05; Palma Violets; 15:10–15:50; Circa Waves; 14:00–14:40; The Strypes; 12:50–13:30	The Prodigy; 21:30–22:50; Jamie T 19:50–20:50; Kodaline; 18:30–19:20; Catfish and the Bottlemen; 17:10–18:00; Idlewild; 15:55–16:40; Peace; 14:45–15:25; Wolf Alice; 13:35–14:15; Marmozets; 12:30–13:05

Sure presents King Tut's Wah Wah Tent
Friday 10 July	Saturday 11 July	Sunday 12 July
Mark Ronson; 22:35–23:50; Fatboy Slim; 20:50–22:05; Hot Chip; 19:20–20:20; Duke Dumont; 18:05–18:50; Jessie Ware; 16:55–17:35; Hannah Wants; 15:45–16:25; The Twilight Sad; 14:45–15:15; Lucy Rose; 13:30–14:00	Courteeners; 23:35–00:50; The Proclaimers; 22:05–23:05; St. Vincent; 20:35–21:35; Jungle; 19:05–20:05; Paul Heaton & Jacqui Abbott; 17:50–18:35; Marina and the Diamonds; 16:35–17:20; Jack Savoretti; 15:20–16:05; The Coronas; 14:20–14:55; Stevie McCrorie; 13:15–13:50	Above & Beyond; 21:35–22:50; Clean Bandit; 20:00–21:00; Oliver Heldens; 18:30–19:30; Modest Mouse; 17:10–18:00; Everything Everything; 15:55–16:40; Admiral Fallow; 14:50–15:25; Saint Raymond; 13:45–14:20; And So I Watch You from Afar; 12:40–13:15

Slam Tent
Friday 10 July	Saturday 11 July	Sunday 12 July
Ben Klock; 22:30–00:00; Adam Beyer B2B Joseph Capriati; 21:00–22:30; Slam; 19:30–21:00; Eats Everything; 18:00–19:30; Âme; 16:30–18:00; Telford; 15:30–16:30	Maceo Plex; 23:30–01:00; Røhåd; 22:10–23:30; Jackmaster B2B Joy Orbison; 20:40–22:10; Gary Beck; 19:20–20:40; Annie Mac; 18:00–19:20; Lil Louis; 16:30–18:00; Art Department; 15:00–16:30; Visionquest; 13:30–15:00	Loco Dice; 21:00–23:00; Dubfire; 19:45–21:00; Dixon; 18:30–19:45; Maya Jane Coles; 17:15–18:30; Claude VonStroke; 16:00–17:15; Surgeon & Lady Starlight; 14:45–16:00; Alan Fitzpatrick; 13:15–14:45; Dense & Pika; 12:00–13:15

T-Break Stage
Friday 10 July	Saturday 11 July	Sunday 12 July
SchnarffSchnarff' Dead Man Fall Kitty, Daisy & Lewis Lonely the Brave Grant Nicholas Rae Morris Indiana DIVIDES Apache Darling	Ded Rabbit Other Humans Our Future Glory George the Poet Sunset Sons Vaults Elle King Gavin James Bry Tijuana Bibles Catholic Action AmatrArt	The Claramassa Spring Break Crash Club Walking on Cars Young Guns Benjamin Booker Black Rivers Gerry Cinnamon The Van T's Be Charlotte

BBC Introducing Stage
Friday 10 July	Saturday 11 July	Sunday 12 July
Hector Bizerk Model Aeroplanes The Beach The Hearts Fort Hope Coasts The Riptide Movement Blossoms The Beaches	Neon Waltz Vukovi Dead Ceremony RedFaces Yr Eira Pinact Clubs Peur Stillhound	The Xcerts Dive In Cassels Miaoux Miaoux Sykes Man of Moon Monogram Love Nor Money Bdy_Prts Tongues

== Incidents ==
On 11 July 2015, a 36-year-old man died at the festival, with his body discovered in toilets. A T in the Park spokesman said: "We are extremely saddened by this news, and our thoughts are with the family at this time." He said the organisers were helping police with their inquiries. The Police treated his death as unexplained but not suspicious.

The number of arrests reduced to 44, which was significantly less than 2013 where there was 91 arrests, while the number incidents dealt with the Scottish Ambulance Service were also down to 606 compared with 858 in 2014.

=== Traffic ===
On Saturday night, the traffic situation ended in chaos, with claims of up to five hour delays, which were partly blamed on the wet conditions which resulted in tractors hauling hundreds of vehicles onto the exit road.

Organisers apologised throughout the weekend and well into Monday about the issues. The festival's director Geoff Ellis said: "A few things contributed to the delays. It's a brand new site and the weather wasn't kind to us on Saturday which led to a lot of people having to be towed from the west car park slowing us down because we don't have the benefit of 18 years of infrastructure that we did at Balado. We have continuously advised that there are no suitable pedestrian walkways in or out of the venue but over the last two nights, a high volume of people have done this anyway. This meant that the traffic coming in to the pick-up points could not access the event, causing tailbacks and increasing the numbers walking as they tried to meet their pick-ups further along the road."

On Monday 13 July, MSP Liz Smith, for mid Scotland and Fife called for a major review of the event, stating it was "not unexpected" that there had been delays on the "narrow country roads". She went on to say "these are exactly the kind of issues which were flagged up months ago when many people warned of the unsuitability of the surrounding road system at Strathallan."

== See also ==
- List of music festivals in the United Kingdom
