= Link FM =

England
- Frequency: 92.2 FM

Programming
- Format: Community Radio

Ownership
- Owner: Independent

History
- First air date: 6 April 2007
- Last air date: 28 June 2010

Link FM was a community radio station operating in Havering, east London on 92.2 FM. Its first broadcast was in 1992, with the station going on air for a couple of weeks. Every summer since then Link FM has repeated this format of short-term broadcasts. In the summer of 2005 there was no broadcast with the station deciding to go on air at Christmas instead. In 2006 it was announced that after 10 years of short-term broadcasts that Link FM had been awarded a full-time community radio licence, with the station opening permanently in April 2007. However due to lack of funding the station closed down in June 2010.

== Origin ==
The concept of Havering having its own community radio station was trialled in 1990 at Harold Wood Primary School. This was the first school ever in the country to broadcast radio. It was trialled again a year later but this time at St.Edward's Church of England Comprehensive School.

The first time Link FM went on air in 1992 turned out to be very popular among the local community, with many volunteers joining the station soon after the broadcast. Many people who joined the group in 1992 are still involved today and have formed The Friends of LINK FM.

== Presenters ==
- Joe Agius
- Michelle Birks
- James Brokenshire
- Phil Brown
- Dave Butler
- Ian Camfield
- Nicki Cook
- Pete Corrigan
- Ross Gilbert
- Chris Heath
- Kim Hurrell
- Laurence Kehoe
- Ian Leigh
- Lee Linley
- Andy Losq
- Jill Martin
- Jason McCrossan
- Roni O'Brien
- Mike Parrott
- Jo Ratcliffe
- Nik Rawlinson
- Tom Rennie
- Paul Smailes
- Gemma Smith
- David Sparks
- David Thorogood
- Keith Upton
- John Varnham
- Martin Youldon
- Monty Zero

== Closure ==
On Sunday, 27 June 2010, it was announced that the service was to close at midday the following day.

"This hasn't been easy. We have 60 volunteers - some who have been with us since inception - and we've put a lot of hours, blood, sweat and tears into the station" Nikki Cook told the Romford Recorder.

The newspaper also reported that the station had applied for 30 grants, all of which were turned down.
