= Lost Stars =

2014 single by Adam Levine

Song by Adam Levine

from the album Begin Again: Music from and Inspired by the Original Motion Picture and V (deluxe edition)
- Released: June 23, 2014
- Recorded: 2012
- Studio: Electric Lady Studios (New York City, New York)
- Length: 4:27 (Adam Levine version); 4:01 (Keira Knightley version)
- Label: ALXNDR; 222; Polydor; Interscope
- Songwriters: Gregg Alexander; Danielle Brisebois; Nick Lashley; Nick Southwood
- Producers: Gregg Alexander; Nick Lashley; Nick Southwood

Official audio
- "Lost Stars" on YouTube

"Lost Stars" is an original song performed by Maroon 5 frontman Adam Levine for the romantic comedy-drama film Begin Again. It was released on June 23, 2014, through ALXNDR, 222 Records, Polydor, and Interscope in the United States.

The song was written and produced by Gregg Alexander, Danielle Brisebois, Nick Lashley and Nick Southwood. It was recorded in New York City at Electric Lady Studios in mid-2012. "Lost Stars" also includes two versions, one for actress Keira Knightley and the other by Levine titled "Into the Night Mix", which are included on the film's soundtrack, with the original version appearing on the deluxe edition of Maroon 5's fifth studio album V (2014). Levine is also noted for his falsetto usage in the chorus.

"Lost Stars" was performed live for the first time on the season finale of The Voice's season seven by Levine and his team member Matt McAndrew. Their performance peaked at number 83 on the US Billboard Hot 100. Later, Levine performed the song with his band Maroon 5 at the 87th Academy Awards on February 22, 2015. A version by New Radicals led by Alexander and Brisebois was released on August 23, 2024, alongside "Murder on the Dancefloor", originally performed by Sophie Ellis-Bextor.

== Music videos ==
=== Adam Levine version ===
A lyric video of the song by Adam Levine was released on June 30, 2014. It follows the scenes from Begin Again, with the film's character Dave Kohl (portrayed by Levine).

An acoustic version of the song was released on August 29, 2014. The video shows Levine performing the song in a recording studio with Maroon 5 member James Valentine playing the guitar. This version does not appear on the film's soundtrack.

=== Keira Knightley version ===
Another lyric video of the song by Keira Knightley was released on June 26, 2014. Like the first lyric video, it follows with another character Gretta James (portrayed by Knightley).

=== Animated lyric video ===
An animated lyric video version of "Lost Stars" was performed by New Radicals (whose members include co-writers Gregg Alexander and Danielle Brisebois) premiered execlusively on Deadline website, February 16, 2015.

== Charts ==
Chart performance for "Lost Stars"
Chart (2014–15)	Peak position
Canada Hot 100 (Billboard) Duet with Matt McAndrew	86
France (SNEP)	145
South Korea (Gaon)	2
South Korea (Gaon) Keira Knightley version	21
South Korea (Gaon) Into the Night mix	55
UK Singles (Official Charts)	93
US Billboard Hot 100 Duet with Matt McAndrew	83

== Certifications ==
Certifications for "Lost Stars"
Region	Certification	Certified units/sales
Brazil (Pro-Música Brasil)	2× Platinum	120,000^{‡}
New Zealand (RMNZ)	Gold	15,000^{‡}
South Korea	—	2,500,000
United States (RIAA)	Platinum	1,000,000^{‡}
Streaming
South Korea	—	100,000,000
^{‡} Sales+streaming figures based on certification alone.

== Accolades ==
"Lost Stars" was nominated for a 2015 Critics Choice Award for Best Original Song, but lost to "Glory" by John Legend and Common from Selma. The song was also nominated for Best Original Song at the 2015 Academy Awards, where it also lost to "Glory". However, the song did win Best Original Song in a Feature Film at the Hollywood Music in Media Awards.

Year	Award	Category	Recipient(s) and nominee(s)	Result	Ref.
2015	Academy Awards	Best Original Song	Gregg Alexander and Danielle Brisebois for "Lost Stars"	Nominated	
2015	Critics' Choice Awards	Best Song	Keira Knightley performed "Lost Stars"	Nominated	
2015	Hollywood Music in Media Awards	Best Original Song in a Feature Film	Gregg Alexander and Danielle Brisebois for "Lost Stars"	Won	
2015	RTHK International Pop Poll Awards	Top 10 International Gold Song	Adam Levine performed "Lost Stars"	Won	

== Stevie McCrorie version ==
"Lost Stars"

Single by Stevie McCrorie
- Released: 5 April 2015
- Recorded: 2015
- Length: 3:16
- Label: Decca
- Songwriters: Gregg Alexander; Danielle Brisebois; Nick Lashley; Nick Southwood

Stevie McCrorie singles chronology
"Light" (2011)	"Lost Stars" (2015)	"My Heart Never Lies" (2015)

In April 2015, Scottish singer Stevie McCrorie released a cover version of "Lost Stars" as his winner's single following his victory on the fourth series of The Voice UK. On 4 April 2015, McCrorie performed the song "Lost Stars" live on The Voice UK grand final, with the single being released the next day as a digital download. It reached number 6 on the UK Singles Chart and number 1 in his native Scotland the following week, and has since become the most successful winners single from a The Voice UK in the United Kingdom, selling in excess of 62,000 copies.

=== Chart performance ===
Chart (2015)	Peak position
Ireland (IRMA)	89
Scottish Singles Sales (Official Charts)	1
UK Singles (Official Charts)	6

=== Release history ===
Country	Release date	Format	Label
United Kingdom	5 April 2015	Digital download	Decca
