= Dear God No! =

- Film poster
- Directed by: James Bickert
- Written by: James Bickert
- Produced by: James Bickert; Shane Morton; Nick Morgan
- Starring: Jett Bryant; Madeline Brumby; Paul McComiskey
- Cinematography: Jonathan Hilton
- Edited by: James Bickert
- Music by: Bryan Malone
- Distributed by: Archstone Distribution; Monster Pictures
- Release date: September 2011
- Running time: 81 minutes
- Country: United States
- Language: English

Dear God No! is a 2011 US exploitation action-horror film written and directed by James Bickert and starring Jett Bryant.

== Cast ==
- Jett Bryant as Jett: a ruthless and cool outlaw.
- Madeline Brumby as Edna: a coming of age victim of circumstance.
- Paul McComiskey as Dr Marco: A delusional widower intent on conducting unnatural experimentation.
- Jim Sligh as Sheriff

== Development ==
Dear God No!, directed by James Bickert, was conceived in the backyard of James's house with Shane Morton and Nick Morgan. The film was funded on a shoestring by the producers and when they ran out of money a successful Kickstarter campaign was launched which raised $7665 to complete post production.

== Release ==
Dear God No! was premiered at The Plaza Theater Atlanta in September 2011. The feature was filmed entirely on 16mm film in Atlanta during the fall of 2010.

== Artwork ==
The theatrical poster for Dear God No! was designed by renowned cult poster artist Tom "The Dude Designs" Hodge.
