= Valerie Charlton =

Maker of models and props

Valerie Charlton made props, models and special effects for movies in the 1970s and 1980s, especially those by the Monty Python troupe and Terry Gilliam.

Her partner was Julian Doyle, who also worked on many of the same movies.

== Productions and works ==
- The Holy Hand Grenade of Antioch, dragon boat prow, Black Knight's tent and Trojan rabbit in Monty Python and the Holy Grail (1975)
- Jabberwocky (1977)
- Monty Python's Life of Brian (1980)
- Time Bandits (1981)
- The Landstriders in The Dark Crystal (1982)
- Monty Python's The Meaning of Life (1983)
- the winged model of Sam Lowry – the protagonist of Brazil (1985)
- Hoggle and Riding Goblins in Labyrinth (1986)
- Who Framed Roger Rabbit (1988)
- The Adventures of Baron Munchausen (1988)
