= Secrets of Soho =

Marina (The Musical)
- Music: Tim Arnold
- Lyrics: Tim Arnold
- Book: Tim Arnold; Lisa Dillon
- Basis: Secrets of Soho by Tim Arnold

Secrets of Soho is a solo album by British singer songwriter Tim Arnold that was released in 2006. Arnold went on to write an original story derived from the themes and characters on the album, resulting in the new stage musical Marina. In 2009, actress Lisa Dillon joined Arnold as co-writer on the script for the stage musical, which was completed in 2010.
