= The Voice UK series 4 =

Fourth series of The Voice UK

The Voice UK
- Series 4
- Hosted by: Emma Willis; Marvin Humes
- Coaches: will.i.am; Sir Tom Jones; Rita Ora; Ricky Wilson
- Winner: Stevie McCrorie
- Winning mentor: Ricky Wilson
- Runner-up: Lucy O'Byrne
- No. of episodes: 15

Release
- Original network: BBC One
- Original release: 10 January – 4 April 2015

Series chronology
- ← Previous; Series 3 Next → Series 5

The Voice UK is a British television music competition to find new singing talent. The fourth series started on 10 January 2015. Emma Willis and Marvin Humes returned as hosts, alongside coaches will.i.am, Sir Tom Jones, and Ricky Wilson. Kylie Minogue did not return because of her touring commitments, and was replaced by Rita Ora. On 4 April 2015, Stevie McCrorie was announced the winner of the series, making him the first winner to have received an all-chair turn in the blind auditions. It was also Ricky Wilson's first win as coach.

== Coaches ==
Coaches and Presenters for Series 4 of The Voice UK

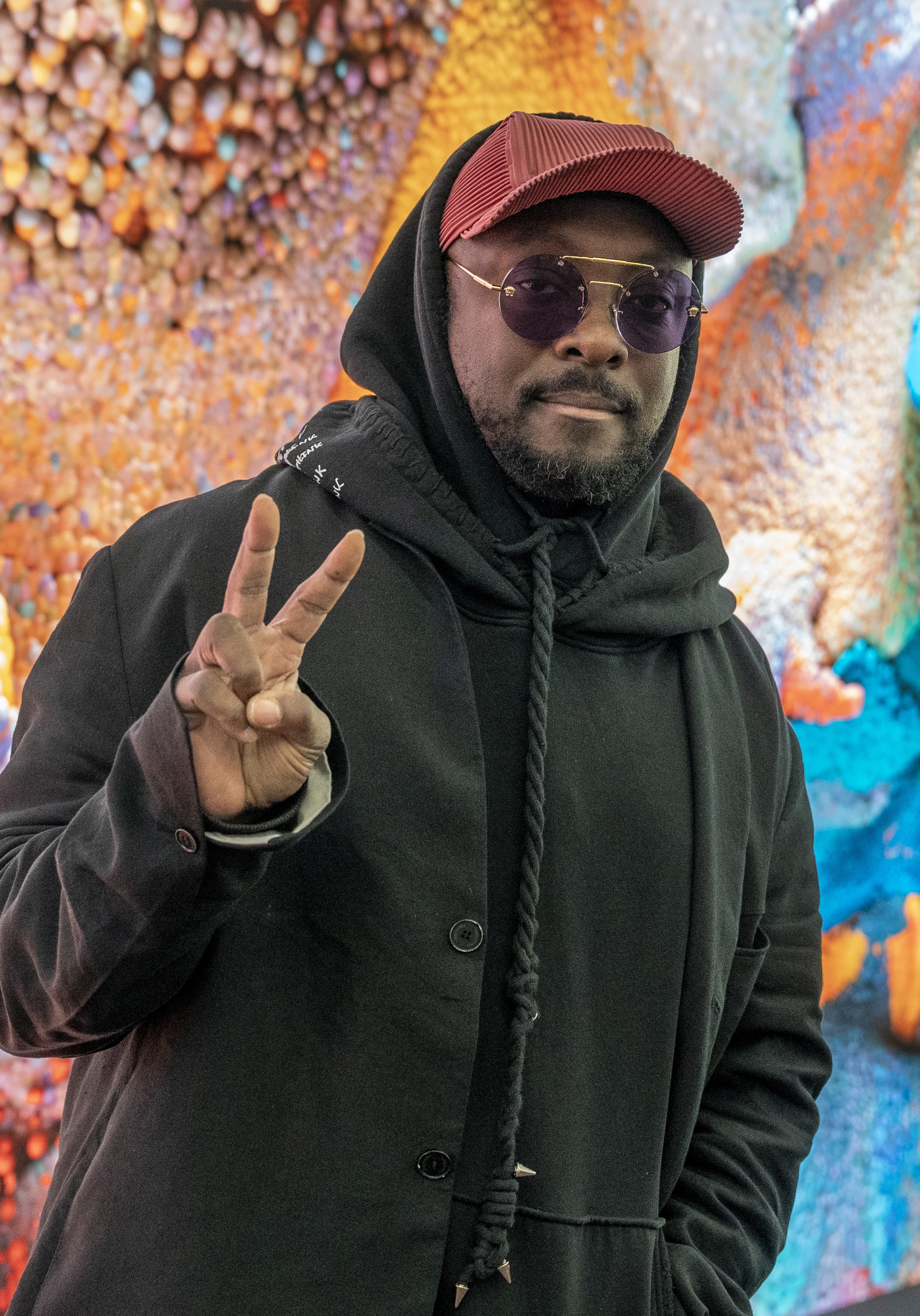
will.i.am

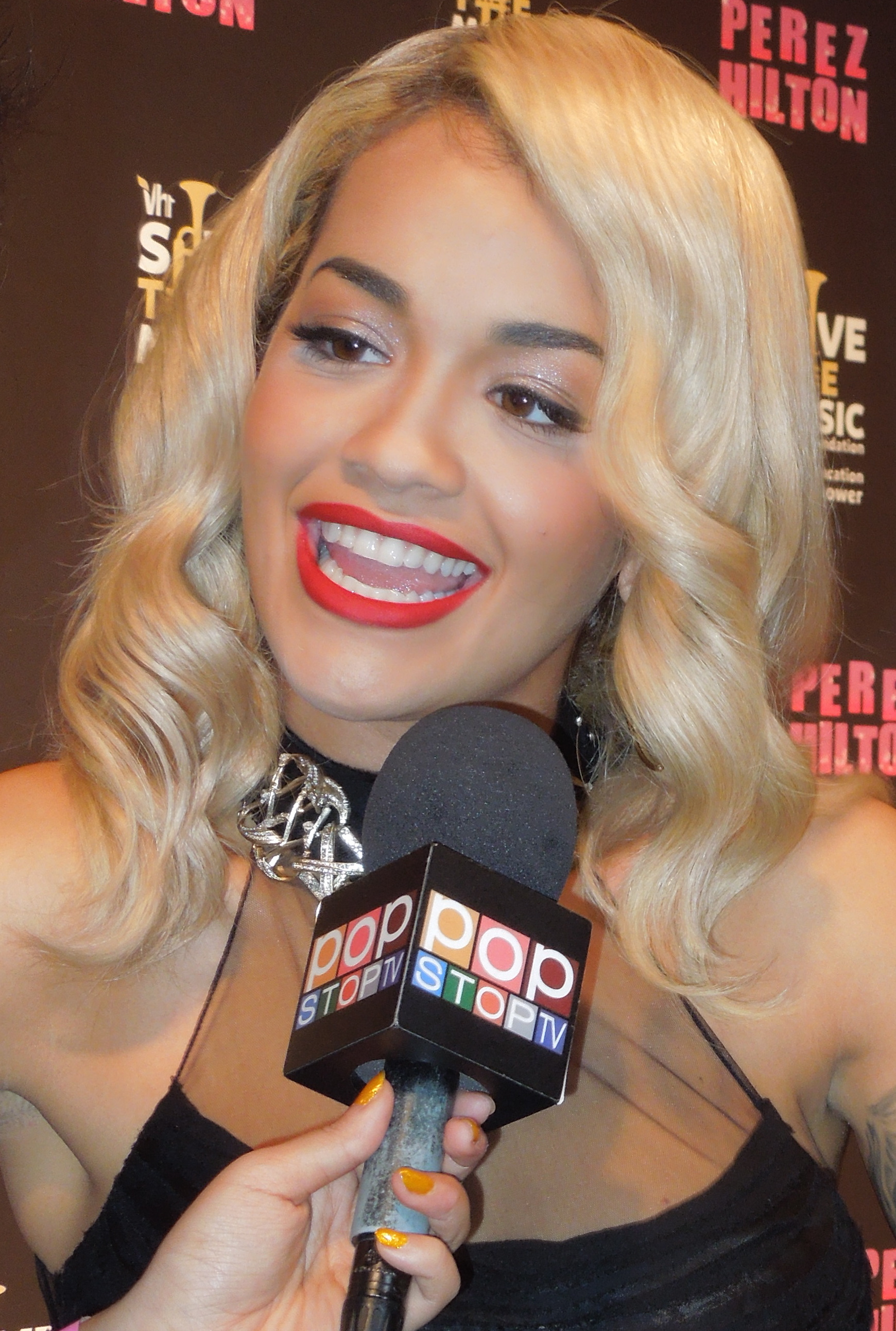
Rita Ora

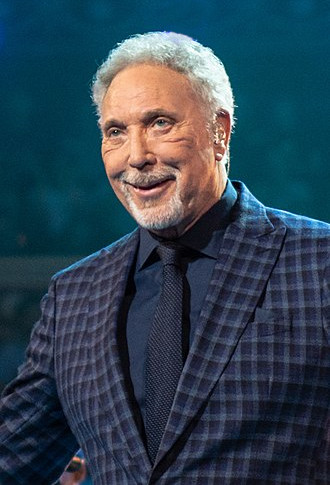
Sir Tom Jones

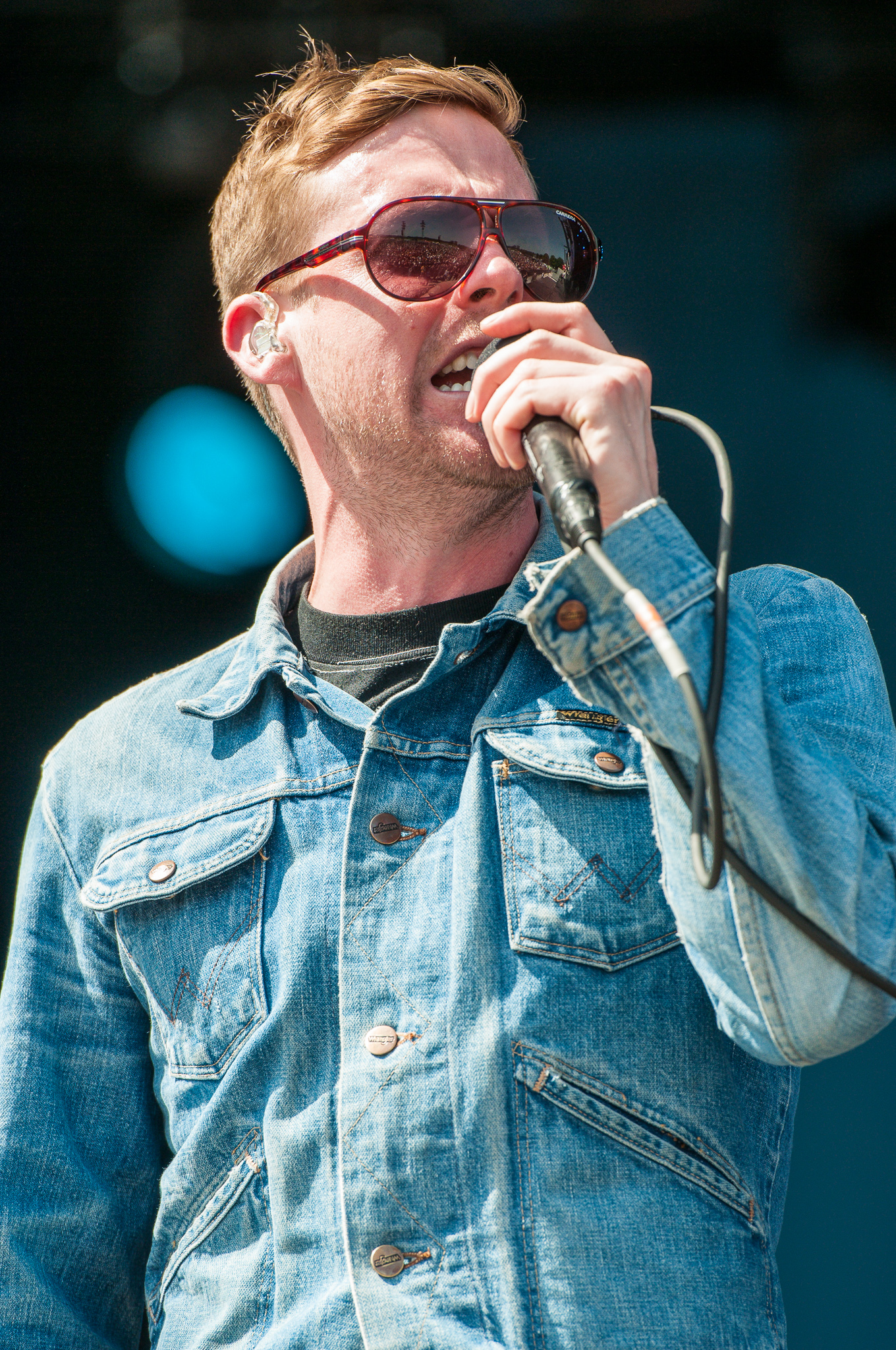
Ricky Wilson

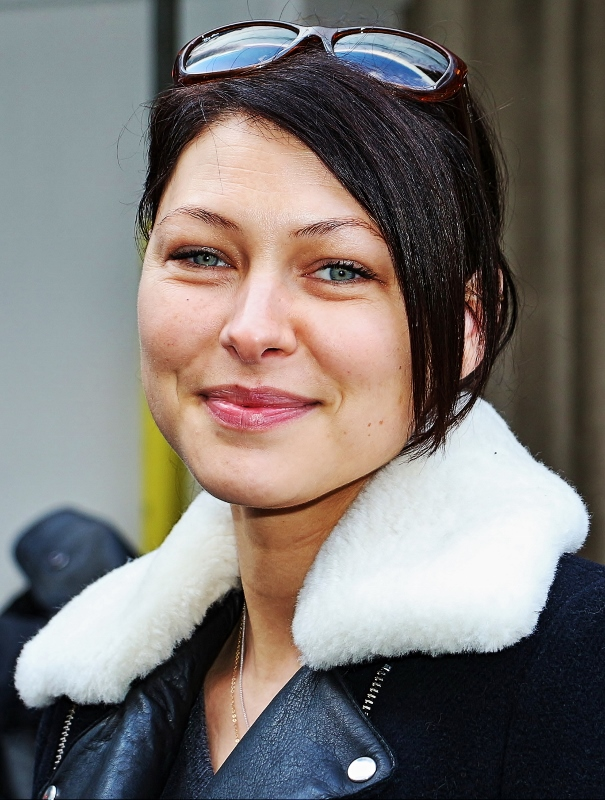
Emma Willis (host)

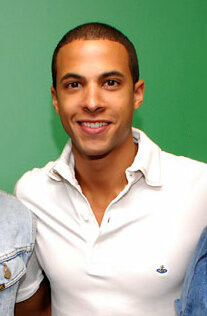
Marvin Humes (host)

On 22 March 2014, Kylie Minogue confirmed that she would not be returning for another series; when asked if she would return under different circumstances, she said "I would have to think about it really seriously as I did for this series".

Two days later, the BBC confirmed that she was not quitting the show, but on 11 April 2014, Minogue tweeted that she would not be returning and on 23 September, it was announced that Rita Ora would replace her.

== Promotion ==
Promotional photos were released on 18 December 2014, including photos of: the coaches (Wilson, Jones, Ora & will.i.am); the presenters (Willis & Humes); and singular shots of each coach.

On 20 December 2014, the first trailer for the series premiered following the final of Strictly Come Dancing at 19:55. The trailer features the four coaches sitting at a bar, when a crow singing behind them catches their attention. They begin to sing along with the crow until a waiter brings over a cooked chicken that they have ordered. Despite thinking the crow would be annoyed, he continues to sing with the group then joining in.

== Teams ==
Colour key:

- Winner
- Runner-up
- Third place
- Eliminated in the Live shows
- Eliminated in the Knockouts
- Artist was stolen by another coach at the Battles
- Eliminated in the Battles

Coach	Top 48 Artists				
will.i.am					
will.i.am	Lucy O'Byrne	Sheena McHugh	Vikesh Champaneri	Esmée Denters	Brooklyn Lammiman
will.i.am	Jake Shakeshaft	Newtion Matthews	Ryan Green	~~Joyful Soundz~~	~~Karl Loxley~~
will.i.am	Hollie Barrie	Andrew Marc	Rozzy Turner	Stephen Cornwell	
Rita Ora					
Rita Ora	Joe Woolford	Karis Thomas	Clark Carmody	Liss Jones	DTwinz
Rita Ora	Mitch Miller	Shellyann Evans	Hannah Wildes	~~Olivia Lawson~~	~~Ryan Green~~
Rita Ora	Morven Brown	The Mac Bros	NK	Vanessa Hunt	
Sir Tom Jones					
Sir Tom Jones	Sasha Simone	Howard Rose	Lara Lee	Rosa Iamele	Sharon Murphy
Sir Tom Jones	Daniel Duke	Joyful Soundz	Karl Loxley	~~Claudia Rose~~	Kim Alvord
Sir Tom Jones	Lisa Ward	Cai Williams	Stephanie Webber	Roisin Geraghty-McDonagh	
Ricky Wilson					
Ricky Wilson	Stevie McCrorie	Emmanuel Nwamadi	Autumn Sharif	Letitia George	Hannah Symons
Ricky Wilson	Christina Matovu	Claudia Rose	Olivia Lawson	~~Hannah Wildes~~	~~Shellyann Evans~~
Ricky Wilson	~~Vikesh Champaneri~~	Classical Reflection	Jade Hewitt	Tim Arnold	
Note: Italicized names are stolen artists (names struck through within former teams).

== Blind auditions ==
Each coach has the length of the artists' performance to decide if they wanted that artist on their team. Should two or more coaches want the same artist, then the artist will choose their coach.

Colour key
✔	Coach hit his/her "I WANT YOU" button
	Artist defaulted to this coach's team
	Artist elected to join this coach's team
	Artist eliminated with no coach pressing his or her "I WANT YOU" button
	Artist received an 'All Turn'.

=== Episode 1 (10 January) ===
The 90-minute premiere of the series was broadcast on 10 January 2015 from 7.00pm until 8.30pm. This was the first year that the first act got less than 4 turns.

Group performance: The Voice UK coaches – "Ready to Go"

Order	Artist	Age	Song	Coaches' and artists choices			
Order	Artist	Age	Song	will.i.am	Rita	Tom	Ricky
1	Letitia George	24	"Stay with Me"	—	✔	✔	✔
2	Lucy O'Byrne	23	"Ebben? Ne Andro Lontana"	✔	✔	—	—
3	Howard Rose	27	"My Generation"	—	—	✔	✔
4	Emilie Cunliffe	16	"Clarity"	—	—	—	—
5	Ryan Green	17	"Magic"	—	✔	—	—
6	Paul Cullinan	48	"Mustang Sally"	—	—	—	—
7	Hannah Symons	26	"Powerless"	✔	✔	✔	✔
8	Matt Eaves	30	"House of the Rising Sun"	—	—	—	—
9	Stephen McLaughlin	16	"Piece of My Heart"	—	—	—	—
10	Stevie McCrorie	29	"All I Want"	✔	✔	✔	✔

=== Episode 2 (17 January) ===
The second episode was broadcast on 17 January 2015, and 85 minutes long, airing from 7.00pm until 8.25pm.

Order	Artist	Age	Song	Coaches' and artists choices			
Order	Artist	Age	Song	will.i.am	Rita	Tom	Ricky
1	Jade Hewitt	27	"Here for the Party"	—	✔	—	✔
2	Marc Armstrong	36	"Jealous Guy"	—	—	—	—
3	Classical Reflection	19	"Nella Fantasia"	—	—	—	✔
4	Jake Shakeshaft	19	"Thinking Out Loud"	✔	✔	✔	—
5	Billy Bottle and Martine	33 & 34	"The Power"	—	—	—	—
6	Mitchell Noakes	19	"Heartbreak Hotel"	—	—	—	—
7	Sasha Simone	25	"XO"/"Royals"	—	—	✔	✔
8	Shellyann Evans	26	"Kiss from a Rose"	—	—	—	✔
9	Tom Carpenter	20	"Suit and Tie"	—	—	—	—
10	Clark Carmody	26	"I'm Not the Only One"	—	✔	✔	—

=== Episode 3 (24 January) ===
The third episode was broadcast on 24 January 2015, and 85 minutes long, broadcast from 7.00pm until 8.25pm.

Order	Artist	Age	Song	Coaches' and artists choices			
Order	Artist	Age	Song	will.i.am	Rita	Tom	Ricky
1	Stephanie Webber	25	"Mama's Broken Heart"	✔	✔	✔	✔
2	Josh McDonough	19	"Waves"	—	—	—	—
3	Otty Warmann	32	"Express Yourself"	—	—	—	—
4	Joe Woolford	19	"Lights"	—	✔	✔	✔
5	Daniel Duke	24	"I'm Gonna Be (500 Miles)"	✔	✔	✔	—
6	Shirleymarie	31	"Here You Come Again"	—	—	—	—
7	Liss Jones	24	"Dark Horse"	—	✔	✔	✔
8	James Duke	24	"Love Story"/"Sugar, We're Going Down"	—	—	—	—
9	Dene Michael	57	"Never Give Up on a Good Thing"	—	—	—	—
10	Emmanuel Nwamadi	23	"The Sweetest Taboo"	—	—	—	✔
11	Esmée Denters	26	"Yellow"	✔	✔	✔	✔

=== Episode 4 (31 January) ===
The fourth episode was broadcast on 31 January 2015, and was 90 minutes long, airing from 7.00pm until 8.30pm.

Order	Artist	Age	Song	Coaches' and artists choices			
Order	Artist	Age	Song	will.i.am	Rita	Tom	Ricky
1	Tim Arnold	39	"Running Up That Hill"	—	—	—	✔
2	Kim Alvord	24	"Scream (Funk My Life Up)"	—	—	✔	—
3	Dawn Allen	48	"Wish I Didn't Miss You"	—	—	—	—
4	Ross Harris	23	"Good Kisser"	—	—	—	—
5	The Mac Bros	24	"Bohemian Rhapsody"/"Johnny B. Goode"/"Oh My God"	—	✔	—	—
6	Hollie Barrie	30	"Timber"	✔	✔	✔	✔
7	Ciaran O'Driscoll	25	"Sweet Dreams (Are Made of This)"	—	—	—	—
8	Morven Brown	17	"Afterglow"	—	✔	—	—
9	Oli Bond	17	"All Along the Watchtower"	—	—	—	—
10	Rosa Iamele	16	"White Noise"	—	—	✔	✔
11	Sharon Murphy	52	"Forever Young"	—	—	✔	✔
12	DTwinz	23	"Shy Guy"	✔	✔	✔	—
13	Cai Williams	34	"Licence to Kill"	—	—	✔	—
14	Stephen Bloy	44	"Bring Him Home"	—	—	—	—
15	Olivia Lawson	17	"Smells Like Teen Spirit"	✔	✔	—	✔

=== Episode 5 (7 February) ===
The fifth episode was broadcast on 7 February 2015, and was 85 minutes long, airing from 7.15pm until 8.40pm.

Order	Artist	Age	Song	Coaches' and artists choices			
Order	Artist	Age	Song	will.i.am	Rita	Tom	Ricky
1	Newtion Matthews	30	"Who Did That To You?"	✔	—	—	—
2	Hannah Wildes	24	"All Good Things (Come to an End)"	—	✔	✔	✔
3	Alex David Charles	52	"I Wish"	—	—	—	—
4	Karis Thomas	16	"Right to Be Wrong"	—	✔	—	—
5	Harris Hameed	16	"Apologize"	—	—	—	—
6	Stephen Cornwell	23	"She Looks So Perfect"	✔	—	✔	—
7	Kate Flynn	23	"Best of You"	—	—	—	—
8	Krazy Horse	70	"Bad Moon Rising"	—	—	—	—
9	Vikesh Champaneri	19	"Hometown Glory"	—	✔	✔	✔
10	Rozzy Turner	33	"Bang Bang"	✔	—	—	—
11	Brooklyn Lammiman	19	"Super Bass"	✔	✔	—	✔
12	Nathan Moore	49	"Seven Nation Army"	—	—	—	—
13	Claudia Rose	17	"Love You I Do"	—	—	✔	✔

=== Episode 6 (14 February) ===
The sixth episode was broadcast on 14 February 2015, and was 80 minutes long, airing from 7.15pm until 8.35pm.

Order	Artist	Age	Song	Coaches' and artists choices			
Order	Artist	Age	Song	will.i.am	Rita	Tom	Ricky
1	Karl Loxley	24	"Nessun Dorma"	✔	—	—	—
2	Si Genaro	43	"Falling Slowly"	—	—	—	—
3	Mia Sylvester	27	"Addicted To You"	—	—	—	—
4	Keedie Green	41	"Titanium"	—	—	—	—
5	Lara Lee	29	"There Are Worse Things I Could Do"	—	—	✔	—
6	Joyful Soundz	39 & 34	"You're All I Need To Get By"	✔	—	—	—
7	The Rise	33 & 32	"Pop"	—	—	—	—
8	Susan Lovejoy	49	"MacArthur Park"	—	—	—	—
9	NK	21	"Me and My Broken Heart"	—	✔	✔	✔
10	Damian Dalton Smith	39	"Folsom Prison Blues"	—	—	—	—
11	Christina Matovu	24	"If I Go"	—	—	—	✔
12	Sheena McHugh	26	"Hold On, We're Going Home"	✔	✔	✔	✔

=== Episode 7 (21 February) ===
The seventh episode was broadcast on 21 February 2015, and was 85 minutes long, airing from 7.00pm until 8.25pm.

Order	Artist	Age	Song	Coaches' and artists choices			
Order	Artist	Age	Song	will.i.am	Rita	Tom	Ricky
1	Vanessa Hunt	26	"Sunshine of Your Love"	—	✔	✔	✔
2	Matt Baker	32	"Are You Gonna Go My Way"	—	—	—	—
3	Autumn Sharif	19	"Crying for No Reason"	—	—	✔	✔
4	Kyle Parry	27	"Try"	—	—	—	Team full
5	Michelle Gee	40	"I Feel For You"	—	—	—	Team full
6	Sarah Dunn	33	"Barbie Girl"	—	—	—	Team full
7	Mitch Miller	26	"Fancy"	—	✔	—	Team full
8	JoCee	23	"Show Me Love"	—	Team full	—	Team full
9	Craig Bunch	35	"With a Little Help from My Friends"	—	Team full	—	Team full
10	Roisin Geraghty-McDonagh	25	"Coat of Many Colours"	—	Team full	✔	Team full
11	Annelies Kruidenier	20	"Chandelier"	—	Team full	—	Team full
12	Charlotte Turnbull	18	"Gecko (Overdrive)"	—	Team full	—	Team full
13	Lisa Ward	26	"Weak"	✔	Team full	✔	Team full
14	Andrew Marc	48	"What's Love Got to Do with It"	✔	Team full	Team full	Team full

== Battle rounds ==
The battle rounds will consist of two 2 hour shows on 28 February and 7 March. In a change for the fourth series, the coaches will be allowed to steal two artists each, as opposed to just the one in the previous two series. The eighth episode was 120 minutes long, and aired from 7.15pm until 9.15pm and The ninth episode was 120 minutes long, and aired from 7.30pm until 9.30pm.

Colour key

✔	Coach hit his/her "I WANT YOU" button
	Artist won the Battle and advanced to the Knockouts
	Artist lost the Battle but was stolen by another coach and advances to the Knockouts
	Artist lost the Battle and was eliminated

Episode	Coach	Order	Winner	Song	Loser	'Steal' result			
Episode	Coach	Order	Winner	Song	Loser	will.i.am	Rita	Tom	Ricky
Episode 1 (28 February)	will.i.am	1	Newtion Matthews	"Shout"	Joyful Soundz	—N/a	—	✔	—
Episode 1 (28 February)	Ricky Wilson	2	Christina Matovu	"Love Runs Out"	Jade Hewitt	—	—	—	—N/a
Episode 1 (28 February)	Rita Ora	3	Joe Woolford	"I Won't Give Up"	Ryan Green	✔	—N/a	✔	—
Episode 1 (28 February)	will.i.am	4	Brooklyn Lammiman	"Paradise City"	Rozzy Turner	—N/a	—	—	—
Episode 1 (28 February)	Tom Jones	5	Rosa Iamele	"Halo"	Claudia Rose	—	✔	—N/a	✔
Episode 1 (28 February)	Ricky Wilson	6	Hannah Symons	"Edge of Seventeen"	Shellyann Evans	—	✔	—	—N/a
Episode 1 (28 February)	Rita Ora	7	Clark Carmody	"Everytime"	Olivia Lawson	—	—N/a	—	✔
Episode 1 (28 February)	Tom Jones	8	Sharon Murphy	"Blame It on Me"	Roisin Geraghty-McDonagh	—	—	—N/a	—N/a
Episode 1 (28 February)	Rita Ora	9	Mitch Miller	"Express Yourself"	Morven Brown	—	—N/a	—	—N/a
Episode 1 (28 February)	Tom Jones	10	Howard Rose	"You Make My Dreams"	Stephanie Webber	—	—	—N/a	—N/a
Episode 1 (28 February)	Ricky Wilson	11	Stevie McCrorie	"Demons"	Tim Arnold	—	—	—	—N/a
Episode 1 (28 February)	will.i.am	12	Lucy O'Byrne	"Memory"	Karl Loxley	—N/a	—	✔	—N/a
Episode 2 (7 March)	Ricky Wilson	1	Letitia George	"Under Pressure"	Vikesh Champaneri	✔	—	—N/a	—N/a
Episode 2 (7 March)	will.i.am	2	Jake Shakeshaft	"Every Teardrop Is a Waterfall"	Stephen Cornwell	—N/a	—	—N/a	—N/a
Episode 2 (7 March)	Rita Ora	3	Liss Jones	"Straight Up"	Vanessa Hunt	—N/a	—N/a	—N/a	—N/a
Episode 2 (7 March)	Tom Jones	4	Daniel Duke	"Am I Wrong"	Cai Williams	—N/a	—	—N/a	—N/a
Episode 2 (7 March)	will.i.am	5	Sheena McHugh	"Sisters Are Doin' It for Themselves"	Hollie Barrie	—N/a	—	—N/a	—N/a
Episode 2 (7 March)	Ricky Wilson	6	Autumn Sharif	"If I Ain't Got You"	Hannah Wildes	—N/a	✔	—N/a	—N/a
Episode 2 (7 March)	will.i.am	7	Esmee Denters	"Every Little Thing She Does Is Magic"	Andrew Marc	—N/a	—N/a	—N/a	—N/a
Episode 2 (7 March)	Rita Ora	8	DTwinz	"Maps"	The Mac Bros	—N/a	—N/a	—N/a	—N/a
Episode 2 (7 March)	Tom Jones	9	Sasha Simone	"The Tracks of My Tears"	Lisa Ward	—N/a	—N/a	—N/a	—N/a
Episode 2 (7 March)	Rita Ora	10	Karis Thomas	"Don't Speak"	NK	—N/a	—N/a	—N/a	—N/a
Episode 2 (7 March)	Tom Jones	11	Lara Lee	"My Kind of Love"	Kim Alvord	—N/a	—N/a	—N/a	—N/a
Episode 2 (7 March)	Ricky Wilson	12	Emmanuel Nwamadi	"The Living Years"	Classical Reflection	—N/a	—N/a	—N/a	—N/a

== Knockout rounds ==
The Knockout rounds aired on 14 and 15 March 2015. Teams of 8 after the battles were stripped down to 3 for the live shows. The tenth episode was 75 minutes long, and aired from 7.15pm until 8.30pm and eleventh episode was 75 minutes long, and aired from 7.45pm until 9.00pm.

Colour key:

Artist won the Knockouts and advanced to the Live shows
Artist lost the Knockouts and was eliminated

Episode	Order	Coach	Artist	Song	Result
Episode 1 (14 March)	1	Rita Ora	DTwinz	"I'm Every Woman"	Eliminated
Episode 1 (14 March)	2	Rita Ora	Joe Woolford	"Hey Ya!"	Advanced
Episode 1 (14 March)	3	Rita Ora	Mitch Miller	"You Spin Me Round (Like a Record)"	Eliminated
Episode 1 (14 March)	4	Rita Ora	Karis Thomas	"True Colors"	Advanced
Episode 1 (14 March)	5	Rita Ora	Shellyann Evans	"Firework"	Eliminated
Episode 1 (14 March)	6	Rita Ora	Hannah Wildes	"Dreams"	Eliminated
Episode 1 (14 March)	7	Rita Ora	Clark Carmody	"Take Me to Church"	Advanced
Episode 1 (14 March)	8	Rita Ora	Liss Jones	"If I Could Turn Back Time"	Eliminated
Episode 1 (14 March)	1	will.i.am	Newtion Matthews	"Missing"	Eliminated
Episode 1 (14 March)	2	will.i.am	Jake Shakeshaft	"As Long as You Love Me"	Eliminated
Episode 1 (14 March)	3	will.i.am	Brooklyn Lammiman	"Let It Go"	Eliminated
Episode 1 (14 March)	4	will.i.am	Esmée Denters	"As"	Eliminated
Episode 1 (14 March)	5	will.i.am	Vikesh Champaneri	"It's a Man's Man's Man's World"	Advanced
Episode 1 (14 March)	6	will.i.am	Sheena McHugh	"Bring Me to Life"	Advanced
Episode 1 (14 March)	7	will.i.am	Ryan Green	"Thinkin Bout You"	Eliminated
Episode 1 (14 March)	8	will.i.am	Lucy O’Byrne	"Un Bel di Vedremo"	Advanced
Episode 2 (15 March)	1	Ricky Wilson	Christina Matovu	"You Gotta Be"	Eliminated
Episode 2 (15 March)	2	Ricky Wilson	Olivia Lawson	"Wicked Game"	Eliminated
Episode 2 (15 March)	3	Ricky Wilson	Hannah Symons	"Drunk In Love"	Eliminated
Episode 2 (15 March)	4	Ricky Wilson	Stevie McCrorie	"I Still Haven't Found What I'm Looking For"	Advanced
Episode 2 (15 March)	5	Ricky Wilson	Letitia George	"Twist and Shout"	Eliminated
Episode 2 (15 March)	6	Ricky Wilson	Emmanuel Nwamadi	"I've Been Loving You Too Long"	Advanced
Episode 2 (15 March)	7	Ricky Wilson	Autumn Sharif	"Human Nature"	Advanced
Episode 2 (15 March)	8	Ricky Wilson	Claudia Rose	"Misty Blue"	Eliminated
Episode 2 (15 March)	1	Tom Jones	Joyful Soundz	"Optimistic"	Eliminated
Episode 2 (15 March)	2	Tom Jones	Karl Loxley	"Your Song"	Eliminated
Episode 2 (15 March)	3	Tom Jones	Rosa Iamele	"Heart Of Glass"	Eliminated
Episode 2 (15 March)	4	Tom Jones	Daniel Duke	"Shake It Off"	Eliminated
Episode 2 (15 March)	5	Tom Jones	Sasha Simone	"Lost & Found"	Advanced
Episode 2 (15 March)	6	Tom Jones	Sharon Murphy	"Woman in Love"	Eliminated
Episode 2 (15 March)	7	Tom Jones	Lara Lee	"God Bless the Child"	Advanced
Episode 2 (15 March)	8	Tom Jones	Howard Rose	"Proud Mary"	Advanced

== Live shows ==
The live shows began on 21 March 2015 and ended on 4 April 2015. The quarter-final featured performances from Jermain Jackman & Olly Murs, while Jess Glynne & Sia performed on the semi-final. The final featured performances from Charles Hamilton and Rita Ora, Paloma Faith & The Script.

=== Results summary ===
Team’s colour key
Team Will
Team Rita
Team Tom
Team Ricky
Result's colour key
Artist given 'Fast Pass' by their coach and did not face the public vote
Artist received the fewest votes and was eliminated
Artist won the competition

Weekly results per artist
Contestant	Week 1	Week 2	Week 3	
Contestant	Week 1	Week 2	Round 1	Round 2
Stevie McCrorie	Fast Pass	Safe	Safe	Winner (week 3)
Lucy O'Byrne	Fast Pass	Safe	Safe	Runner-up (week 3)
Emmanuel Nwamadi	Safe	Safe	Eliminated	Eliminated (week 3)
Sasha Simone	Fast Pass	Safe	Eliminated	Eliminated (week 3)
Joe Woolford	Safe	Eliminated	Eliminated (week 2)	
Karis Thomas	Fast Pass	Eliminated	Eliminated (week 2)	
Sheena McHugh	Safe	Eliminated	Eliminated (week 2)	
Vikesh Champaneri	Safe	Eliminated	Eliminated (week 2)	
Autumn Sharif	Eliminated	Eliminated (week 1)		
Clark Carmody	Eliminated	Eliminated (week 1)		
Howard Rose	Eliminated	Eliminated (week 1)		
Lara Lee	Eliminated	Eliminated (week 1)		

=== Live show details ===
==== Week 1: Quarter-final (21 March) ====
After all three artists from each team have performed, the coach will then have to decide which artist they want to give a "fast pass" to and put straight through to the semi-final. The voting lines for the remaining artists will then open after all twelve artists have performed, in a format change compared to previous series, the four artists with the fewest votes, regardless of which team, will leave the competition.

The first part of the show was 115 minutes long, and aired from 7.30pm until 9.25pm. The second part was 35 minutes long, and aired from 9.35pm until 10.10pm.

- Group performance: The Voice UK coaches ("Unbelievable")
- Special musical guests: Jermain Jackman ("How Will I Know") and Olly Murs ("Seasons")

Order	Coach	Artist	Song	Result
1	Ricky Wilson	Autumn Sharif	"Hold Back the River"	Eliminated
2	Ricky Wilson	Emmanuel Nwamadi	"Another Day in Paradise"	Advanced
3	Ricky Wilson	Stevie McCrorie	"All Through the Night"	Fast pass
4	Tom Jones	Lara Lee	"God Put a Smile upon Your Face"	Eliminated
5	Tom Jones	Howard Rose	"Read My Mind"	Eliminated
6	Tom Jones	Sasha Simone	"Sail"	Fast pass
7	Rita Ora	Karis Thomas	"Riptide"	Fast pass
8	Rita Ora	Clark Carmody	"No Diggity"/"Ain't No Sunshine"	Eliminated
9	Rita Ora	Joe Woolford	"Don't Wake Me Up"	Advanced
10	will.i.am	Sheena McHugh	"Glow"/"Princess of China"	Advanced
11	will.i.am	Lucy O’Byrne	"When You Wish Upon a Star"	Fast pass
12	will.i.am	Vikesh Champaneri	"Get the Party Started"	Advanced

==== Week 2: Semi-final (28 March) ====
After all eight artists from each team have performed, the four artists with the most viewer votes advance to the live final, regardless of their team. Because of the format change, with the eliminations of Karis Thomas and Joe Woolford, Rita Ora no longer has any artists remaining on her team. She became the first coach in The Voice UK history to not have an artist in the final.

This episode was 125 minutes long and aired from 7.00pm until 9.05pm.

- Group performances: Team Tom with Tom Jones ("River Deep - Mountain High"), Team Rita with Rita Ora ("Rude"), Team Will with will.i.am ("That's the Way (I Like It)"/"Get Down Tonight"), and Team Ricky with Ricky Wilson ("Stay With Me")
- Special musical guests: Jess Glynne ("Hold My Hand") and Sia ("Elastic Heart")

Order	Coach	Artist	Song	Result
1	will.i.am	Lucy O'Byrne	"O mio babbino caro"	Advanced
2	Rita Ora	Joe Woolford	"Jealous"	Eliminated
3	will.i.am	Sheena McHugh	"Toca's Miracle"	Eliminated
4	Ricky Wilson	Emmanuel Nwamadi	"A Whiter Shade of Pale"	Advanced
5	Rita Ora	Karis Thomas	"Say Something"	Eliminated
6	will.i.am	Vikesh Champaneri	"Don't Leave Me This Way"	Eliminated
7	Tom Jones	Sasha Simone	"Say You Love Me"	Advanced
8	Ricky Wilson	Stevie McCrorie	"Bleeding Love"	Advanced

==== Week 3: Final (4 April) ====
This episode was 130 minutes long, and aired from 7.00pm until 9.10pm.

- Special musical guests: Charles Hamilton and Rita Ora ("New York Raining"), Paloma Faith ("Beauty Remains"), The Script ("Man on Wire")

Order	Coach	Artist	First song	Second song (duet)	Third song	Winner's song	Result
1	Tom Jones	Sasha Simone	"What I Did for Love"	"Chain Of Fools" (with Tom Jones)	N/A (already eliminated)		Eliminated
2	Ricky Wilson	Emmanuel Nwamadi	"Somebody That I Used to Know"	"Crazy" (with Ricky Wilson)	N/A (already eliminated)		Eliminated
3	will.i.am	Lucy O'Byrne	"No Surprises"	"Habanera" (with will.i.am)	"Ebben? Ne Andro Lontana"	"Lost Stars"	Runner-up
4	Ricky Wilson	Stevie McCrorie	"I'll Stand By You"	"Get Back" (with Ricky Wilson)	"All I Want"	"Lost Stars"	Winner

== Reception ==
=== Ratings ===
Episode	Date	Official ratings (in millions)	BBC One weekly rank	Share	Source
Blind auditions 1	10 January	9.05	1	35.9%	
Blind auditions 2	17 January	9.47	2	38.5%	
Blind auditions 3	24 January	9.15	2	38.4%	
Blind auditions 4	31 January	9.58	2	39.4%	
Blind auditions 5	7 February	9.74	2	40.3%	
Blind auditions 6	14 February	10.10	2	41.3%	
Blind auditions 7	21 February	8.08	9	30.5%	
Battle rounds 1	28 February	8.47	4	33.1%	
Battle rounds 2	7 March	8.13	5	31.9%	
Knockout rounds 1	14 March	8.03	4	31.6%	
Knockout rounds 2	15 March	8.27	2	31.9%	
Live show 1	21 March	7.49	1	32.8%	
Live results 1	21 March	7.49	6	32.8%	
Live show 2	28 March	7.26	5	30.2%	
Live final	4 April	6.87	5	31.6%	
Series average	2015	8.55	-	32.6%	
