= Natural Light (album) =

Studio album by Dan Mangan
- Released: May 16, 2025
- Genre: Indie folk; indie rock
- Length: 45:13
- Label: Arts & Crafts
- Producer: Jason Haberman; Don Kerr; Dan Mangan; Mike O'Brien

Dan Mangan chronology
Being Elsewhere Mix (2024)	Natural Light (2025)

Natural Light is the ninth album by Canadian singer-songwriter Dan Mangan, released May 16, 2025, on Arts & Crafts Productions. His first time recording a full album with his touring band of guitarist Mike O'Brien, bassist Jason Haberman and drummer Don Kerr, the album arose out of workshop sessions at Haberman's Southern Ontario cottage, which had originally been intended as simple rehearsals and song workshopping in preparation for later recording sessions, but which ultimately produced the completed album.

Before recording the album, Mangan had considered calling his next album Schminger Schmongwriter. Several of the album's songs were written years earlier, and some were even under consideration for inclusion on his prior albums More or Less and Being Somewhere.

Additional guest musicians on the album included Begonia on backing vocals, Emily Steinwall on saxophone, and Jesse Zubot on violin.

The album was preceded by the preview singles "Melody" and "Cut the Brakes".

== Critical response ==
Alex Hudson of Exclaim! positively reviewed the album, writing that "it's an album of grandeur (the horn crescendo of "I Hated Love Songs" leading into the strange pitter-patter sound collage of "Contained Free") and wide-lens lyricism (the political teachings of the aptly named "Soapbox"). But, most importantly, it's full of stripped-down introspection from someone who's really good at that sort of thing."

For the Vancouver Sun, Stuart Derdeyn compared the album to Blue Rodeo's classic album Five Days in July, which was created through a similar process of demo recordings that unexpectedly cohered into a complete album.

== Track listing ==
All songs written by Dan Mangan, Mike O'Brien, Jason Haberman and Don Kerr, with additional collaborators Leith Ross on "My Dreams Are Getting Weirder", J.E. Sunde on "Diminishing Returns", and Mike Castle on "I Hated Love Songs".

Natural Light track listing
No.	Title	Length
1.	"It Might Be Raining"	5:42
2.	"Diminishing Returns"	3:01
3.	"I Hated Love Songs"	3:25
4.	"Contained Free (Interlude)"	0:46
5.	"No Such Thing As Wasted Love"	3:00
6.	"Melody"	3:20
7.	"My Dreams Are Getting Weirder"	3:31
8.	"Soapbox"	4:34
9.	"Cut the Brakes"	3:37
10.	"For Him"	3:10
11.	"Sound the Alarm"	3:21
12.	"Proximity"	3:16
13.	"Hit the Wall"	4:25
Total length:		45:13

== Personnel ==
Credits adapted from Tidal.

- Dan Mangan – production (all tracks), vocals (tracks 1–3, 5–13), percussion (1–3, 6, 9, 13), acoustic guitar (1, 2, 6–13), background vocals (2), synthesizer (3, 10, 11); bird song, electric guitar (3); kalimba (4), piano (6, 10, 11)
- Jason Haberman – production, mixing (all tracks); bass (tracks 1–3, 6–13), percussion (1–3, 6, 7, 9, 13), synthesizer (1, 4, 6, 8), Wurlitzer electric piano (1), autoharp (2), chimes (7, 12), kalimba (7), electric guitar (8), background vocals (13)
- Don Kerr – production (all tracks), drums (tracks 1–3, 6–13), percussion (1–3, 6–9, 13), synthesizer (1, 3, 6–8, 11), kalimba (2), vocals (9), background vocals (11, 13), chimes (12), acoustic guitar (13)
- Mike O'Brien – production (all tracks), electric guitar (tracks 1–3, 6, 8, 9, 11–13), percussion (1–3, 6, 9, 13), background vocals (2, 11, 13), melodica (2), acoustic guitar (3, 6, 10, 13), synthesizer (4, 8, 9), vocals (6, 9), glockenspiel (7)
- Gavin Gardiner – mastering
- Jesse Zubot – violin (tracks 1, 10)
- Emily Steinwall – saxophone (tracks 3, 13)
- Tom Richards – trombone (tracks 3, 13)
- Rebecca Hennessy – trumpet (tracks 3, 13)
- Marcel lí Bayer – clarinet, saxophone (tracks 6, 11); flute (11)
- Begonia – background vocals (track 12)
