= Club Meds =

Studio album by Dan Mangan
- Released: January 13, 2015
- Genres: Indie folk, indie rock
- Length: 45:21
- Label: Arts & Crafts

Dan Mangan chronology
| Oh Fortune (2011) | Club Meds (2015) | More or Less (2018) |

Singles from Club Meds
- 1. "Vessel" Released: October 21, 2014; 2. "Mouthpiece" Released: November 5, 2014

Club Meds is the fourth studio album by Juno winning Canadian singer-songwriter Dan Mangan, released on 13 January 2015. It is his first album to be released under the moniker Dan Mangan + Blacksmith.

== Background ==
Mangan's previous solo effort, 2011's Oh Fortune earned him a JUNO Award for New Artist of the Year and for Alternative Album of the Year. Club Meds comes after a two-year hiatus in Mangans' career so he could concentrate on being a father. Blacksmith is formed by a variety of Vancouver musicians, primarily Kenton Loewen, Gordon Grdina and John Walsh. A press release by the group claims that "Through a fog of analog feedback loops and synths, the band’s performances breathe deeply and steadily like a dragon at rest."

== Singles ==
The first single to be released off the album is "Vessel", written for the 2014 film Hector and the Search for Happiness starring Simon Pegg. Mangan composed multiple other instrumental sections and is credited on the film's score. Jason Grishkoff of IndieShuffle said that "I had to keep Dan's new track 'Vessel' on repeat, and the good news is that it pretty much didn't get old". A video for the single directed by artist Ben Clarkson was released on October 21, 2014. Reception to the video was positive with NPR's Bob Boilen writing that "The video is stunning — funny, odd and quirky, but with a sense of purpose" Speaking on the music video and song, Mangan stated that "people are comfortable with a middle-ground safe place. We're afraid to be honest with ourselves and actually work through the highs and the lows and embrace them." The song also features Dave Grohl on backing vocals and slide guitar.

A second single, "Mouthpiece", was released November 5, 2014. Spin wrote that "Mouthpiece" was "a memorable cut that should hopefully make the positive word of mouth migrate down to the U.S."

== Tour ==
Mangan did a 36 stop tour of North America in support of the album from October, 2014 to March, 2015. The tour began in Philadelphia and ended in Vancouver, and included a performance at Toronto's famous Massey Hall. Support on the tour included Canadian singer-songwriter Hayden and Calgary act Astral Swans.

== Critical reception ==
Professional ratings
Aggregate scores
| Source | Rating |
|---|---|
| Metacritic | 79/100 |
Review scores
| Source | Rating |
| AllMusic | 4/5 stars |
| Consequence of Sound | B– |
| Exclaim! | 8/10 |

Alex Hudson of Exclaim! stated: "This record posits Mangan as a bandleader rather than a solo act, since it's co-credited to his group Blacksmith, and it downplays troubadour-like folksiness in favour of cryptic darkness. Although Mangan is still a balladeer at heart, his mellow songs now come swaddled in blankets of reverb and fleshed out by inventive full-band arrangements that draw on art-rock, worldbeat and jazz."

== Track listing ==
Music composed by Dan Mangan + Blacksmith (Dan Mangan, Gordon Grdina, Kenton Loewen, John Walsh). All lyrics by Dan Mangan, except where noted.

| No. | Title | Length |
|---|---|---|
| 1. | "Offred" | 5:55 |
| 2. | "Vessel" | 3:07 |
| 3. | "Mouthpiece" | 3:42 |
| 4. | "A Doll’s House / Pavlovia" (Grdina/Mangan) | 4:04 |
| 5. | "Kitsch" | 5:11 |
| 6. | "XVI" | 3:58 |
| 7. | "War Spoils" | 2:52 |
| 8. | "Forgetery" | 3:51 |
| 9. | "Club Meds" | 3:10 |
| 10. | "Pretty Good Joke" | 4:50 |
| 11. | "New Skies" | 4:41 |
