= Have a Little Faith in Me =

1987 song by John Hiatt

Song by John Hiatt

from the album Bring the Family
- Released: June 3, 1987
- Recorded: February 1987
- Studio: Ocean Way (Hollywood)
- Genre: Rock
- Length: 4:01
- Label: A&M
- Songwriter: John Hiatt
- Producer: John Chelew

"Have a Little Faith in Me" is a song written and performed by American singer John Hiatt that appears on his 1987 album Bring the Family. His version of the song has also appeared on the soundtracks of the movies Look Who's Talking Now (1993), Benny & Joon (1993), Phenomenon (1996), The Theory of Flight (1998), Cake (2005), My Best Friend’s Girl (2008), Love Happens (2009), Father Figures (2017), and Benjie (2017). Live versions were included on 1994's Hiatt Comes Alive at Budokan? and 2005's Live from Austin, TX. The song has been included in all of his greatest hits collections, including 1998's The Best of John Hiatt (as a rerecorded version) and Greatest Hits — The A&M Years ’87-’94, 2001’s Anthology, 2003’s 20th Century Masters, and the 2005 box set Chronicles.

== Background ==
The song was the first song written by Hiatt following his sobriety from drugs and alcohol, which had contributed to his marriage breakdown and his being released by former record labels. Hiatt's original attempt at recording the song took place at a friend's studio and included a larger instrument accompaniment. However, the recording was plagued by technical issues. The morning after, Hiatt was informed that his estranged wife had committed suicide. Hiatt attributes the technical problems with the original recording as a sign that the song was not meant to be heard that way, and he eventually released the song with a much simpler piano accompaniment.

== Mandy Moore version ==
"Have a Little Faith in Me"

Single by Mandy Moore

from the album Coverage
- Released: August 25, 2003
- Length: 4:02
- Label: Epic
- Songwriter: John Hiatt
- Producer: John Fields

Mandy Moore singles chronology
"Cry" (2001)	"Have a Little Faith in Me" (2003)	"Drop the Pilot" (2003)

Music video
- "Have a Little Faith in Me" on YouTube

"Have a Little Faith in Me" is the first single and closing track from Coverage (2003), the third studio album by American actress and singer Mandy Moore. The song was written by John Hiatt and produced by John Fields. The song was included on her first greatest hits album The Best of Mandy Moore (2004). "Have a Little Faith in Me" did not have a major impact in the United States, reaching number 39 on the Billboard Mainstream Top 40.

=== Track listings ===
- US CD single
1. "Have a Little Faith in Me" (album version) – 4:03
2. "Have a Little Faith in Me" (Ford remix) – 3:59
- Digital download
1. "Have a Little Faith in Me" – 4:03

=== Charts ===
Chart (2003)	Peak position
US Pop Airplay (Billboard)	39

== Covers ==
- Bill Frisell released an instrumental version on his 1992 album Have a Little Faith.
- Delbert McClinton recorded his version in 1992 for the album Never Been Rocked Enough.
- New Zealand electronica band Strawpeople recorded their version in 1992 for the album Worldservice.
- Joe Cocker recorded his version in 1994 for the album Have a Little Faith. While the single did not chart, the album went at least gold in 6 nations.
- Jewel recorded a cover for the soundtrack to the 1996 film Phenomenon.
- Ilse DeLange recorded a cover of the song on her live album Dear John, in 1999.
- Chaka Khan recorded a cover for the soundtrack to the 2000 HBO film Disappearing Acts.
- X Factor UK finalist Daniel Evans recorded this for his 2010 debut album No Easy Way.
- Jon Bon Jovi recorded his version in 2011 for the film New Year's Eve (duet with Lea Michele).
- Jamie N Commons recorded a cover version for his second EP Rumble and Sway released in 2013.
- Maisy Stella (as Daphne Conrad) and Will Chase (as Luke Wheeler) in the third season of the television show Nashville. The song was performed on episode 19 "The Storm Has Just Begun." It was released as a single and included on the album The Music of Nashville: Season 3, Volume 2.
- Pop Rock band The Summer Set sampled the main tempo for their song Heart on the Floor, featured on their 2013 album Legendary.
- Dan Mangan recorded his version in 2019 for the covers album Thief.
- Galantis and Dolly Parton recorded their version in a 2019 single "Faith".
- The English duo 29 Palms recorded the song as the final track on their 1992 album No Eden.
- SYML recorded his version in 2022 as a single.
- Dr. Teeth and the Electric Mayhem covered this song on the 2023 streaming series The Muppets Mayhem, with Dr. Teeth on lead vocals. It is also included in the show's soundtrack album.
- Norwegian jazz vocalist Solveig Slettahjell with The Slow Motion Quartet recorded their cover for the 2005 album Pixiedust. This version was used in the 2012 NRK broadcast "Nordlandsbanen - minutt for minutt."
