= Astral Swans (album) =

Studio album by Astral Swans
- Released: October 8, 2021
- Studio: The Department of Creativity and Mischief
- Genre: Indie folk; experimental folk; lo-fi
- Length: 34:25
- Label: Saved by Vinyl (Canada); Tiny Room Records (Netherlands); Moorworks (Japan)
- Producer: Paul Chirka; Brock Geiger; Astral Swans

Astral Swans chronology
Strange Prison (2018)	Astral Swans (2021)

Astral Swans is the third studio album by Canadian singer-songwriter Astral Swans, released on October 8, 2021, on Saved by Vinyl (Canada), Tiny Room Records (Netherlands), and Moorworks (Japan). It was described by Exclaim! as "the culmination of everything he's been building toward," featuring "bleakly existential lyrics lifted by gorgeous arrangements," and by RANGE magazine as an album that "boasts a confidence and musical optimism unlike his previous albums."

== Track listing ==
No.	Title	Length
1.	"Spiral" (feat. Julie Doiron)	2:33
2.	"Flood" (feat. Julie Doiron)	3:08
3.	"Blackhole Town" (feat. Julie Doiron)	2:45
4.	"End of the World (Missing You)"	2:33
5.	"Sympathy for the Stupid"	3:29
6.	"Bird Songs"	2:39
7.	"The Wind in a Mindless Universe"	1:59
8.	"Cross Bones Style" (written by Chan Marshall)	3:33
9.	"March 28/20"	2:40
10.	"Beautiful Things Happen"	2:36
11.	"More Nothing Than Something"	3:01
12.	"I Was Awake for a While"	3:49
Total length:		34:25

== Personnel ==
All vocals and instrumentation by Matthew Swann, except:

- Julie Doiron (Eric's Trip) – vocals (tracks 1, 2, 3, 8)
- Brock Geiger (Reuben and the Dark) – drums, guitar, keys, bass, percussion, clarinet (tracks 1, 2, 3, 4, 5, 6, 7, 9, 10, 11, 12)
- Scott Munro (Preoccupations) – bass, synths, guitar, background vocals (tracks 4, 5, 7, 10, 11)
- Paul Chirka – keys, strings, mellotron, synth (tracks 2, 5, 6, 8, 10, 12)
- Kevin Sullivan – saxophone (tracks 2, 11)
- Jim Bryson – guitar, background vocals (track 6)
- Cassia Hardy (Wares) – guitar (track 5)
- Laura Leif – vocals (track 5)
- Laura Hickli – background vocals (track 6)
- Minami Taiga – vocals (track 7)
- Shalom Toy – vocals (track 9)
- Carol Sweet – vocals (track 12)

All songs written by Matthew Swann, except track 8 written by Chan Marshall. Produced by Paul Chirka, Brock Geiger, and Astral Swans. Recorded and mixed by Paul Chirka at The Department of Creativity and Mischief.
