= Good People Rock =

GOOD PEOPLE ROCK: A Yellow Bird Project Covers Compilation

Compilation album by Various Artists
- Released: April 14, 2015
- Genre: Folk; Rock; Pop
- Label: Madic Records, Arts & Crafts Productions
- Producer: Casey Cohen, Matthew Stotland

GOOD PEOPLE ROCK: A Yellow Bird Project Covers Compilation is an exclusive album of Yellow Bird Project bands covering other Yellow Bird Project bands. It was released in vinyl and digital formats via Madic Records, which is a label imprint of Arts & Crafts Productions, owned and operated by Dan Mangan. The album was crowd-funded on PledgeMusic and took several years to produce The album's first single, Andrew Bird's cover of "The Fake Headlines" (originally by The New Pornographers), was released on April 7, 2015, with a music video that was premiered on Pitchfork Media.

== LP Track listing ==
=== Side A ===
1. "The Fake Headlines" (The New Pornographers) performed by Andrew Bird - 3:34
2. "Family Tree" (TV on the Radio) performed by Hayden - 5:43
3. "Mexican Ritual" (Alec Ounsworth) performed by Elvis Perkins featuring Alec Ounsworth - 4:20
4. "Give a Little Love" (Rilo Kiley) performed by Whispertown - 3:08
5. "How's Forever Been Baby" (Elvis Perkins) performed by Alec Ounsworth - 2:55

=== Side B ===
1. "You Are A Runner & I Am My Father's Son" (Wolf Parade) performed by Astral Swans featuring Dan Mangan - 2:06
2. "Take Care" (Beach House) performed by Keaton Henson - 4:19
3. "Satellite Mind" (Metric) performed by Dry the River - 3:23
4. "Not One Bit Ashamed" (King Creosote) performed by Micah P. Hinson - 4:15
5. "Much More Than That" (Sharon Van Etten) performed by T E Morris - 5:37

== Digital Track listing ==
1. "The Fake Headlines" (The New Pornographers) performed by Andrew Bird - 3:34
2. "Family Tree" (TV on the Radio) performed by Hayden - 5:43
3. "Mexican Ritual" (Alec Ounsworth) performed by Elvis Perkins featuring Alec Ounsworth - 4:20
4. "Give a Little Love" (Rilo Kiley) performed by Whispertown - 3:08
5. "Not One Bit Ashamed" (King Creosote) performed by Micah P. Hinson - 4:15
6. "Take it In" (Hot Chip) performed by King Creosote - 5:46
7. "How's Forever Been Baby" (Elvis Perkins) performed by Alec Ounsworth - 2:55
8. "Take Care" (Beach House) performed by Keaton Henson - 4:19
9. "Satellite Mind" (Metric) performed by Dry the River - 3:23
10. "Much More Than That" (Sharon Van Etten) performed by T E Morris - 5:37
11. "You Are A Runner & I Am My Father's Son" (Wolf Parade) performed by Astral Swans featuring Dan Mangan - 2:06
12. "A Field of Birds (YBP Theme Song)" by The Tallest Man On Earth - 3:55
