= Matthew Swann =

Matthew Swann may refer to:

- Matthew Swann (field hockey)
- Matthew Swann (musician)
