= Postcards and Daydreaming =

Postcards & Daydreaming

Studio album by Dan Mangan
- Released: October 20, 2005
- Genre: Folk
- Length: 56:37
- Label: Independent
- Producer: Daniel Elmes

Dan Mangan chronology
Postcards & Daydreaming (2005)	Nice, Nice, Very Nice (2009)

Postcards and Daydreaming is the debut full-length release from Canadian indie singer-songwriter Dan Mangan, released independently on October 20, 2005.

The album was re-released on July 10, 2007 by the File Under Music label.

== Critical reception ==
The album was generally well received in the Canadian indie music scene. Kerry Doole of Exclaim! noted that the album showcases Mangan's "highly promising talent" and that "Mangan's career progress will merit watching." In a review of a later Mangan album, Oh Fortune, Julian Uzielli of mitZine said, "Postcards and Daydreaming (2007), showed obvious potential, despite the fairly generic acoustic-folk sound."

The musical style of the album has been described as "sombre and melancholy" and "a good sulky-day companion".

== Track listing ==
No.	Title	Length
1.	"Not What You Think It Is"	5:52
2.	"Unnatural Progression"	4:15
3.	"Above the Headlights"	2:30
4.	"Journal of a Narcoleptic"	3:55
5.	"Don't Listen"	4:32
6.	"So Much for Everyone"	6:52
7.	"Western Wind"	4:40
8.	"Fabulous"	3:25
9.	"Come Down"	5:12
10.	"Some Place to Come Home To"	4:53
11.	"Reason to Think Aloud"	7:23
12.	"Ash Babe"	4:29

== Personnel ==
- Dan Mangan – vocals, guitar, piano, Fender Rhodes piano
- Amy Arsenault – vocals
- Simon Kelly – guitar, piano, Fender Rhodes piano
- Finn Manniche – cello
- Richard "Rags" Michaelski – harmonica
- Ryan Naso – trumpet
- Kerry Galloway – bass guitar
- Randal Stoll – drums
- Daniel Elmes – Record producer

== Release history ==
Region	Date	Label	Format	Catalog
Canada and US	October 20, 2005	Independent	CD	N/A
Canada and US	July 10, 2007	File Under: Music	CD/Digital Download	FUM001
Australia	March 15, 2008	ABC Music	CD	395706
