= All My Favorite Singers Are Willie Nelson =

Studio album by Astral Swans
- Released: 2015
- Genre: Indie rock
- Label: Madic Records, Arts & Crafts

Astral Swans chronology
All My Favorite Singers Are Willie Nelson (2015)	Strange Prison (2018)

All My Favorite Singers Are Willie Nelson is an album by Astral Swans, released in 2015 by Dan Mangan's Madic Records, an imprint of Arts & Crafts Productions. All My Favorite Singers Are Willie Nelson, was described by VICE as "a stark, beautiful project [...] steeped in 60s psych-folk mythology and loner punk iconography."

== Track listing ==
1. "There Are Ways To Get What You Want"
2. "Beginning Of The End"
3. "Let Their Faces All Blur Out'
4. "Please Don’t Leave Me Strange"
5. "What Calms You Down, Freaks Me Out"
6. "You Carry A Sickness"
7. "Park Street"
8. "September"
9. "Holly"
10. "My Conscience Don’t Work In The New World"
11. "Attention"
12. "Grass Girl"

== Personnel ==
- Matthew Swann – all instruments and vocals except
- Chris Reimer – track 7 sample taken from: Truck Middle from 'The Chad Tape', 2012
- Distance Bullock – drums on tracks 2,4,6,8,11, BG vocals on track 1,2. cello throughout
- Kaelen Ohm – drums on track 5
- Kevin Stebner – drums on track 9
- Paul Chirka – violin on track 1
- All Songs Recorded by Brad Hawkins except tracks 3, and 9 recorded by Lorrie Matheson
- Additional overdubs by Matthew Swann
- Mixed by Gabriel Alan Collins, Matthew Swann, Brad Hawkins,
- Mastered by Ron Skinner at Heading North Mastering
