= Ash Wednesday (disambiguation) =

Ash Wednesday is a Christian religious holiday.

Ash Wednesday may also refer to creative works:

- Ash Wednesday (1921 film), a German silent film directed by Otto Rippert
- Ash Wednesday (1925 film), a German silent film
- Ash Wednesday (1931 film), a German drama film
- Ash Wednesday (1958 film), a Mexican film
- Ash Wednesday (1973 film), a film starring Elizabeth Taylor
- Ash Wednesday (2002 film), a crime drama starring Edward Burns, Elijah Wood, and Rosario Dawson
- Ash Wednesday (musician), Australian musician
- Ash Wednesday (album), a 2007 album by Elvis Perkins
- "Ash Wednesday" (poem), a 1930 poem by T.S. Eliot

Ash Wednesday may also refer to natural disasters:

- Ash Wednesday (1980 bushfires), series of bushfires in South Australia in 1980
- Ash Wednesday (1983 bushfires), a series of bushfires in south-eastern Australia in 1983

== See also ==
- Ash Wednesday Storm of 1962
- 2001 Nisqually earthquake or Ash Wednesday Quake
