= Yellow Bird Project =

Charity organization

- Industry: Retail
- Founded: 2006
- Headquarters: London, England, United Kingdom
- Area served: Worldwide and beyond
- Key people: Founders: Casey Cohen, Matthew Stotland
- Products: Clothing, Books, Film, Music
- Website: merchforgood.net

Yellow Bird Project (often abbreviated YBP) is a company that collaborates with indie bands to raise money for charity, primarily through the sale of T-shirts. They approach indie bands, asking them to choose a charity and submit an original design. Each design is then printed onto T-shirts and sold exclusively through the YBP website to raise money for the charity of the artist's choosing. Some of the bands which they have collaborated with include Andrew Bird, Bloc Party, Bon Iver, Broken Social Scene, Devendra Banhart, and The National. Over the years, the company has diversified to include book publishing, album releases and film projects.

In 2016, UK based charity Trekstock took over the management of the project, enabling all funds to be raised for one cause—young adults living with cancer. As part of the move, the project was rebranded to Merch for Good by Trekstock.⁣

== Contributors ==
- alt-J
- Amanda Palmer
- Andrew Bird
- Animal Collective
- Au Revoir Simone
- Bastille
- Beach House
- Best Coast
- Bloc Party
- Bon Iver
- Broken Social Scene
- CHVRCHES
- Clap Your Hands Say Yeah
- Daughter
- The Dears
- The Decemberists
- Devendra Banhart
- Dry the River
- Editors
- Elvis Perkins
- Emmy the Great
- Freelance Whales
- Grizzly Bear
- Hayden
- Holly Throsby
- Hot Chip
- Jay Reatard
- John Grant
- Joseph Arthur
- Keaton Henson
- The Killers
- King Creosote
- Laura Veirs
- Little Boots
- Local Natives
- The Leisure Society
- The Maccabees
- The Magic Numbers
- Metric
- Metronomy
- My Brightest Diamond
- The National
- The New Pornographers
- Of Montreal
- Patrick Watson
- Purity Ring
- Ra Ra Riot
- Rilo Kiley
- Shame
- Sharon Van Etten
- The Shins
- Stars
- Tegan and Sara
- Tokyo Police Club
- TV on the Radio
- Warpaint
- Whispertown2000
- Wild Beasts
- Wolf Alice
- Wolf Parade
- Wolfmother
- Yann Tiersen

== Publications ==
In 2009, Yellow Bird Project published The Indie Rock Coloring Book, an illustrated tribute to indie rock bands, with a foreword written by Pierre de Reeder of Rilo Kiley and testimonials from Matt Berninger (of The National) and Russell Lissack (of Bloc Party). To promote the book online they created a collaborative group drawing game called 'Color Me Indie'. They also organised 'The Indie Rock Coloring Book Tour' with live shows and coloring events in book stores across San Francisco, New York and Montreal.

As a follow-up publication, YBP released 'The Indie Rock Poster Book' in 2011. Both books (published by Chronicle Books) are intended to raise awareness for their initiative, its contributing musicians, and the charities which they support.

In 2013 YBP self-published a poetry zine, entitled 'Selected Poems by Indie Rock Stars', featuring original and exclusive artwork, poetry and prose from musicians such as Aidan Moffat, Elvis Perkins, Emmy the Great, James Yorkston, Johnny Flynn, Joseph Arthur, Keaton Henson and Robyn Hitchcock. To promote the zine, they created a microsite where you can sign up by email to receive 6 poems in 6 weeks. The microsite also has an area where you can listen to poems as you read them, with dictations from Aidan Moffat (of Arab Strap) and Natalia Yanchak (of The Dears).

== Music releases ==
In December 2013, YBP released a 7" Christmas album, "Wishing for a Christmas Miracle with the Micah P. Hinson Family". The record includes covers of "Silent Night" and "Please Daddy (Don't Get Drunk This Christmas)", a song originally recorded by John Denver for his 1973 album Farewell Andromeda.

On April 14, 2015, YBP released a covers compilation, titled: Good People Rock. The album features 10 exclusive recordings of YBP bands covering other YBP bands, including Andrew Bird, Elvis Perkins, Hayden and Alec Ounsworth (of Clap Your Hands Say Yeah). The album was released by Madic Records, a label founded by Dan Mangan as a subsidiary imprint of Arts & Crafts Productions. It's available in vinyl and digital formats.

Kristian Matsson, who performs under the moniker of The Tallest Man On Earth, wrote and recorded an original theme song for the Yellow Bird Project. The song, "A Field Of Birds", is included as a digital bonus track on the Good People Rock compilation.

== Documentary film ==
In 2016, YBP produced a feature-length documentary, A Matter of Time, about Kathryn Calder (of The New Pornographers) and her mother's battle with ALS. The film was distributed by Kinosmith in Canada and by First Run Features in the USA.
