= John Critchley =

Canadian record producer and musician

- Born: 1964 (age 61–62); North Bay, Ontario, Canada
- Origin: Toronto, Ontario, Canada
- Genre: Rock
- Occupations: Producer, Mixer, Engineer, Musician, Songwriter
- Instruments: Guitar, vocals, piano
- Years active: 1985–Present
- Formerly of: 13 Engines
- Website: greendoorstudios.ca

John Critchley (born 1964) is a Canadian record producer and musician originally from North Bay, Ontario.

Based in Toronto, Critchley is known for his production work, his recording studio Green Door Studios in Parkdale, Toronto, and as the singer/guitarist of Canadian band 13 Engines.

== Awards ==
Critchley co-produced, engineered and mixed the album Days Into Years by the band Elliott BROOD, which won a Juno Award for best Roots & Traditional Album of the Year. Five more Juno nominations to date:

- Elliott BROOD Mountain Meadows
- The Once Departures,
- Amelia Curran Spectators,
- Cris Derksen Orchestral Powwow, and
- Donné Roberts OYA!

Two albums Critchley produced were shortlisted for the Polaris Prize: Mountain Meadows by Elliott BROOD and Nice, Nice, Very Nice by Dan Mangan. Nice, Nice, Very Nice is the first album to date produced by John to be certified GOLD in Canada.

== Musical career ==
Critchley moved to Toronto to study music at York University. Norma Beacroft was a notable visiting professor at that time. There he met Mike Robbins (guitar), and together with original members Albert Jung (drums) and Walter Schweigel (bass), formed The Ikons (1985).

Critchley recorded and produced the band’s first self-titled 8 song independent cassette on 4 track reel to reel at the electronic music studio at York University.

The Ikons, now with Jim Hughes on bass and Grant Ethier on drums, recorded a second self–titled 8 song independent cassette release at The Music Gallery in Toronto with John’s brother/musician Mark Critchley and Campbell Foster.

=== 13 Engines ===
The Ikons became the first band to be signed to Nocturnal Records, a new label launched by Chris Varady who heard the tapes through his job at Metro Records in Detroit. Varady encouraged the band to change their name when he discovered an American band using The Ikons, and 13 Engines was born.

The band's first album, Before Our Time, was praised as a "tough and confident rock and roll record" by Greg Quill of the Toronto Star.

13 Engines recorded and toured extensively for over a decade, creating a body of work on the EMI, SBK/CAPITOL, Nocturnal, Atlantic, and Nettwerk Music Group labels, garnering rave reviews by the likes of David Fricke for Rolling Stone, and attention from Magnet, Billboard, National Chart (cover/March 1994), and Toronto's NOW.

Much of the attention around the band’s 3rd release A Blur To Me Now focused on producer David Briggs' decision to set the band up to rehearse at Neil Young’s Broken Arrow Ranch near Santa Cruz, where work on Ragged Glory had just been completed. The album was recorded by John Hanlon at Sound City in LA.

Their 4th album Perpetual Motion Machine (1993) produced by Critchley and Glen Robinson and recorded at Le Studio in Morin Heights, Quebec, is arguably the band’s biggest commercial success with rave reviews in numerous publications, echoed in NOW's 5 star rave review. It was voted one of the top 50 records of all time by a Canadian artist in a national poll of music critics published by Chart Magazine.

The band recorded one final album, Conquistador in 1996, at Hallamusic in Toronto, mixed at Smart Studios in Madison, Wisconsin. It was produced by 13 Engines and Mr. Colson (Walt Mink, Paw, The Watchmen) before 13 Engines eventually disbanded.

=== Solo ===
In 2000, Critchley recruited Scott Stevenson (guitar), Brendan Canning (bass), Jon McCann (drums) and Leslie Feist (guest harmony vocals) and released a solo album Crooked Mile, recorded at Star Studios in Montreal, produced by John and Glen Robinson. It was released on the SoundKing/Outside imprint to critical acclaim.

=== Production and Green Door Studios ===
In 2002, Critchley began building Green Door Studios in what the City of Toronto Archives indicates was an old blacksmith’s shop, where he continues to work with a wide range of established and new artists including: Dan Mangan, Elliott BROOD, Amelia Curran, The Once, Cris Derksen, Kyp Harness, Jane Bunnett, The Hidden Cameras, Holy Fuck, Alex Southey, The Neighbourhood Watch, Lowest of the Low, Nightmares in the Afternoon, Bryden Gwiss, Donné Roberts, Robyn Dell'Unto, The Discarded, The Fugitives, Shred Kelly, The Warped 45s, The Key Frames, The Leather Uppers, The Royal Crowns, The Bon, Tijuana Bibles, The Superstitions, NQ Arbuckle, Wayne Omaha, Tres Bien Ensemble, and many more.

Critchley has been praised by musicians for both his working style and the finished recordings. Amelia Curran spoke about working with Critchley on her album Spectators: "John’s perfected this delicate balance of being the boss without being authoritative, and (of) being precise and being creative," she says, "After one day he was doing such great work I became interested again and re-inspired". Dan Mangan recalled working with Critchley on Nice Nice Very Nice: "I remember telling John Critchley that I wanted the album to be thoughtful, but that it should still feel like a party at times.... He believed in the songs and I was excited to work with him".

On harder-edged/punk records like The Discarded's album Beyond the Green Door, Critchley's production experience is praised for transforming "tracks that originated from basement jam sessions in late 2020 into a dynamic, cohesive record".

The centerpiece of Critchley’s studio is a 32 channel Yamaha PM2000 analog console built in the 1970s used with a Radar 24 channel converter and recorder with A/D and D/A converters and analogue circuitry.

=== Film and Television Composition ===
Critchley’s composition for film and television credits include: Stranger Than Fiction (television series) Discovery Channel / National Geographic, Biker Gangs (television series) Discovery Channel / National Geographic, Goldirocks (feature film/dir Paula Tiberius), and multiple short films including Pudge (dir Annie Bradley/CFC).

== Discography ==
=== 13 Engines ===
==== Albums ====
- The Ikons (as The Ikons) (1986), Independent
- Before Our Time (1987), Nocturnal Records, Resonance (Europe)
- Byram Lake Blues (1989), Nocturnal Records
- A Blur to Me Now (1991), (SBK/Capitol)
- Perpetual Motion Machine (1993), Atlantic Records, SBK/Capitol, EMI Canada
- Conquistador (1995), EMI Canada, Nettwerk Records
- Perfect Largeness: The Nocturnal Years (Compilation) (1996), Nocturnal Records

==== EPs & Singles ====
- Ignition (1993), SBK/Capitol, EMI Canada
- Brave New Waves Session (2017), Artoffact Records
- "Beached" (1989), Nocturnal Records
- "Big Surprise" (1991), SBK/Capitol
- "King Of Saturday Night" (1991), SBK/Capitol
- "More" (1993), EMI Canada, Atlantic Records
- "Smoke And Ashes" (1993), EMI Canada, Atlantic Records
- "Bred In The Bone" (1993), EMI Canada, Atlantic Records
- "Beneath My Hand" (1995), EMI Canada
- "Personal Golam" / "Waterfall (1995), EMI Canada
- "Tailpipe Blues" (1995), EMI Canada
- "Slow" (1995), EMI Canada

==== Compilation Inclusions ====
- Scoop This (1993), EMI Canada
- Heal It - A Canadian Compilation (1994), EMI Canada
- Have Not Been The Same: The CanRock Renaissance (2012), Pheromone Recordings
- For No Apparent Reason - Sweet Nothing (1987), X Records

=== Solo ===
==== Albums ====
- Crooked Mile (2000), Sound King, Produced by John Critchley/Glen Robinson
