= Hail Satan (disambiguation) =

Hail Satan is an exclamation used by some Satanists.

Hail Satan may also refer to:

- Hail Satan?, 2019 American documentary film
- Hail Satan, 2012 short film featuring Kristian Bruun
- "Hail Satan", song by Mindless Self Indulgence on the 1999 album Tight
- "Hail Satan", song by Black Widow on the 2011 album Sleeping with Demons
- "Hail Satan!", song by Sharon Needles on the 2013 album PG-13
- "Hail Satan", song on the 2024 soundtrack album Longlegs
