= Dry the River =

English alternative rock band

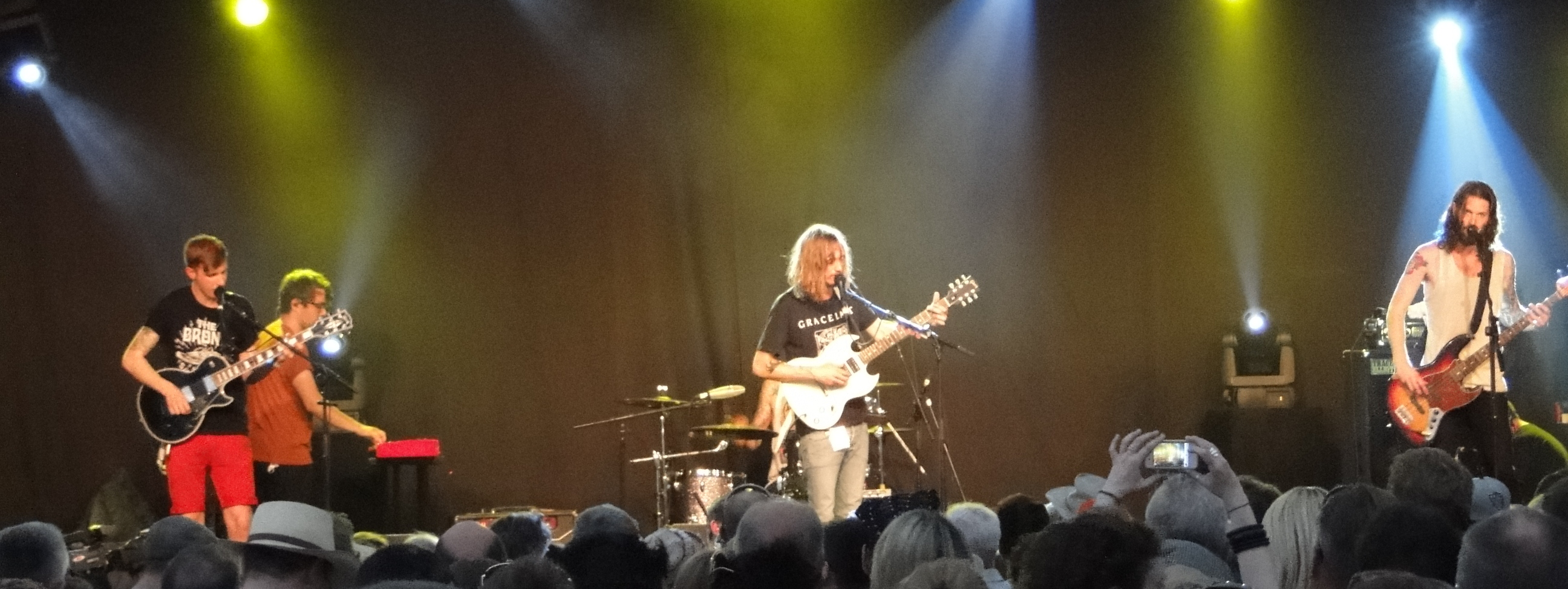
- Dry the River, July 2012

Background information
- Origin: London, England
- Genres: Alternative rock, indie folk
- Years active: 2009-2015
- Labels: Sony, Transgressive
- Members: Peter Liddle; Scott Miller; Matt Taylor; Jon Warren
- Past members: Will Harvey
- Website: drytheriver.net

Dry the River were an English alternative rock band, formed in the Stratford district of East London in 2009.

== History ==
They played their first headline show at the Luminaire in Kilburn, London, in April 2010. Since this time, the band have toured extensively in the United Kingdom, as well as worldwide, including Europe and North America. After two extended plays and significant early radio support from BBC Introducing, the band signed to Transgressive Records in 2010. They released their debut single, "No Rest", in March 2011. The band's subsequent run of UK festivals in 2011 included the Glastonbury Festival, The Great Escape Festival, the iTunes Festival, the Latitude Festival, Summer Sundae, the Green Man Festival, Bestival, and the Reading and Leeds Festivals.

In March 2011, the band created a charity t-shirt for the Yellow Bird Project to raise money for Asylum Aid; an organization that provides specialist legal representation and advice to people seeking asylum in the UK. They also filmed a four-part video series called the "YBP Wilderness Sessions", to promote the release of the shirt.

They were on the long list on the BBC's Sound of 2012 poll. Paul Lester compared them in The Guardian to fellow Londoners Mumford & Sons, commenting that the group "offer a glimpse of the pastoral with their infectious semi-acoustic ditties".

The band recorded their debut album, Shallow Bed in the United States in Bridgeport, Connecticut, with producer Peter Katis. Katis had previously worked with Interpol, Jónsi and The National. The album was released in the UK on 5 March 2012, and in the US on 17 April 2012.

During 2012, they played festival shows throughout Europe, including the Roskilde Festival, the Underage Festival, 2000trees, Pohoda Festival and Open'er Festival, as well as North American festivals, including the Sasquatch Festival, Lollapalooza 2012 and the Austin City Limits Festival. In November 2012, Dry The River released a limited edition beer, brewed with Signature Brew, called Mammoth. An acoustic version of Shallow Bed was released by download only on 17 December 2012.

The band recorded their second album in Iceland in early 2013, to be released later in the year. In February 2014, Dry the River announced on their Facebook page that violinist William Harvey had departed the band in order to pursue other projects. Their second album, titled Alarms in the Heart, was released on 25 August, and was supported by a UK tour. They contributed a cover of a Metric song, "Satellite Mind", for the compilation album Good People Rock which was released on 14 April 2015.

Following their involvement with Disaronno's Terrace Party, the band confirmed in an interview that "next on the agenda is definitely to start thinking about album three". The band went on to explain, "We’re not anywhere close to a release date or anything yet, but Peter has some material he’s been working on that we’re excited about, and we’re looking at getting back into a studio when we can to start work on that".

They announced their split on their Facebook page on 12 November 2015, along with the release of their final EP, Hooves of Doubt.

In 2018, Peter Liddle announced the release of his first solo EP Casual Labour under the name of PD Liddle.

== Members ==
=== Present ===
- Peter Liddle – guitar, tenor horn, lead vocals
- Matthew Taylor – guitar, keys, vocals
- Scott Miller – bass, percussion, vocals
- Jon Warren – drums, percussion

=== Past ===
- Will Harvey – keys, violin, viola, mandolin

== Discography ==
=== Studio albums ===
- Shallow Bed (5 March 2012)
- Alarms in the Heart (25 August 2014)

=== Extended plays ===
- The Chambers and the Valves (2009)
- Bible Belt (2010)
- Weights & Measures (2011)
- Shallow Bed (Acoustic) (2012)
- Hooves of Doubt (2015)

=== Singles ===
- "New Ceremony" (7 March 2011)
- "No Rest" (17 June 2011)
- "Weights and Measures" (11 November 2011)
- "The Chambers and the Valves" (24 February 2012)
- "New Ceremony" (16 April 2012)
- "Zaytoun" (2013)
- "Gethsemane" (June 2014)
- "Everlasting Light" (July 2014)
- "Rollerskate" (January 2015)

== See also ==
- Culture of London
- List of bands from England
- List of folk-rock artists
- List of indie-rock musicians
