= A Blur to Me Now =

1991 studio album by 13 Engines

Studio album by 13 Engines
- Released: 1991
- Genre: Rock, pop
- Label: EMI Music Canada
- Producer: David Briggs, John Hanlon

13 Engines chronology
Byram Lake Blues (1989)	A Blur to Me Now (1991)	Ignition (1993)

A Blur to Me Now is the third album by the Canadian band 13 Engines, released in 1991. They supported it with North American tours, including one opening for Pere Ubu. "Big Surprise" was the first single. The album reached No. 1 on the Canadian College Albums chart.

== Production ==
Recorded in a week at Neil Young's California ranch, the album was produced by David Briggs (who also helped 13 Engines pick the songs) and John Hanlon. The band had admired the pair's work on Young's Ragged Glory, and also wanted to record live but have an outside voice give feedback. The band's manager, Peter Jesperson, was also present for some of the recording sessions, before quitting over the musical direction. The title of the album refers to the period where the band was living in Detroit and hoping to find success. "Throttle Open Wide" is about playing live for only a handful of audience members.

== Critical reception ==
Professional ratings
Review scores
Source	Rating
AllMusic	2.5/5 stars
Calgary Herald	D
Times & Transcript	4/5 stars
Winnipeg Sun	3.5/5 stars

The Calgary Herald called the band "four Neil Young wanna-bes, playing guitar-rock that's supposed to sound cut-throat and on the edge, but comes off arrogant and cliched." Likewise, the Chicago Tribune labeled the album "a sharp set of big pop hooks and big, grungy guitar a la Ragged Glory Neil Young." The Hamilton Spectator considered it "no-frills rock 'n' roll that propels itself along magnetically". The Times Colonist praised the "buzzsaw pop sound" and "fine songwriting".

In 2002, the Regina Leader-Post listed A Blur to Me Now as a "classic example" of "CanRock".

== Track listing ==
No.	Title	Length
1.	"Big Surprise"
2.	"Suffocate"
3.	"King of Saturday Night"
4.	"Another Toss of the Coin"
5.	"You're Nothing If You're Not Strong"
6.	"Abandoned"
7.	"Hurry"
8.	"Clean"
9.	"Gathered Safely In"
10.	"Rolling Home Again"
11.	"Elephant Song"
12.	"Throttle Open Wide"
13.	"Night of the Shooting Star"
