= Hot Little Rocket =

Indie rock band

- Origin: Calgary, Alberta, Canada
- Genre: Indie rock
- Years active: 1998–2009
- Labels: Endearing Records, Saved by Radio, File Under: Music
- Past members: Mark Macarthur; Pat May; Joel Nye; Aaron Smelski; Matthew Swann; Andrew Wedderburn
- Website: www.hotlittlerocket.com (archived)

Hot Little Rocket was a Canadian indie rock band based in Calgary, Alberta, Canada. The band consisted of vocalist and guitarist Andrew Wedderburn, guitarist Aaron Smelski, drummer Joel Nye, and bassists: Mark Macarthur, Pat May, and Matthew Swann.

== History ==
Hot Little Rocket formed in 1998, the band released its debut EP, Laika, in 2000, and followed up with Danish Documentary the following year.

The band performed at a number of venues while in Beijing, China for two weeks. Their second album, Our Work and Why We Do It, was recorded in Chicago, and reached No. 9 on the !earshot charts in 2003.

The band's third album, How to Lose Everything, was produced by Steve Albini. The band was signed to the Filed-Under music label. The band released a single, "Like Killers", from the album.

In 2005, the EP Laika was reissued. Hot Little Rocket disbanded following the release of a final self-titled album. Hot Little Rocket in the fall of 2009. The band played its final show September 19, 2009, at the Marquee Room in Calgary.

Wedderburn published the novel The Milk Chicken Bomb in 2007. The book was a finalist for the Chapters/Books in Canada First Novel Award and the ReLit Award for Fiction in 2008.

=== Former ===
- Mark Macarthur (1997–2005)
- Pat May (2005–2006)
- Joel Nye
- Aaron Smelski
- Matthew Swann (2006–2009)
- Andrew Wedderburn

== Discography ==
=== Albums ===
- Danish Documentary (2001)
- Our Work and Why We Do It (2003)
- How to Lose Everything (2007)
- Hot Little Rocket (2009)

=== EPs and singles ===
- Laika EP (2000)
- China EP (2005)

== See also ==
- Music of Canada
- Canadian rock
- List of Canadian musicians
- Category:Canadian musical groups
