= Elvis Perkins in Dearland =

Studio album by Elvis Perkins
- Released: March 10, 2009 (U.S.)
- Recorded: July 7–29, 2008
- Label: XL Recordings

Elvis Perkins chronology
Ash Wednesday (2007)	Elvis Perkins in Dearland (2009)

Elvis Perkins in Dearland is the second studio album by Elvis Perkins, and his first with backing band Elvis Perkins in Dearland, released on March 10, 2009, on XL Recordings.

Upon release, Perkins stated that he did not wish to record another album like its predecessor:

I'd no interest in making Ash Wednesday II. After the dust had settled I was weary, worn and confused about what had happened, especially that people thought it was so personal. I had a talk with myself as to how I might deal with things second time around. Part of this involved making a band record removed from self and giving three other dudes a say. It's a broader vision.

Professional ratings
Review scores
Source	Rating
Allmusic	link
Drowned in Sound	(8/10) link
NME	(5/10) link
Paste	(93/100) link
Pitchfork Media	(6.7/10) link
Q	(May 2009, pg.117)
Rolling Stone	link
The Skinny	link
Spin	link

== Track listing ==
All songs written by Elvis Perkins

1. "Shampoo"
2. "Hey"
3. "Hours Last Stand"
4. "I Heard Your Voice in Dresden"
5. "Send My Fond Regards to Lonelyville"
6. "I'll Be Arriving"
7. "Chains, Chains, Chains"
8. "Doomsday"
9. "123 Goodbye"
10. "How's Forever Been Baby"

== Chart performance ==
Chart (2009)	Peak position
US Billboard 200	163
US Independent Albums (Billboard)	27
US Heatseekers Albums (Billboard)	8
French Albums (SNEP)	180
UK Independent Albums (Official Charts)	34
