= Alarms in the Heart =

Studio album by Dry the River
- Released: 25 August 2014
- Genres: Indie rock, folk rock
- Length: 45:10
- Label: Transgressive
- Producers: Charlie Hugall, Peter Miles

Dry the River chronology
Shallow Bed (2012)	Alarms in the Heart (2014)	Hooves of Doubt (2015)

Singles from Alarms in the Heart
- 1. "Gethsemane" Released: 16 June 2014; 2. "Everlasting Light" Released: 23 July 2014; 3. "Rollerskate" Released: 9 March 2015

Alarms in the Heart is the second and final studio album by English folk rock band Dry the River. It was released on 25 August 2014 through Transgressive Records. Partially recorded during a stay at an isolated studio in Iceland, the album features collaborations with Scottish singer-songwriter Emma Pollock and Icelandic producer Valgeir Sigurðsson. Alarms in the Heart produced three singles and was supported by a twelve-date UK tour in 2015. The band broke up in November 2015 after releasing Hooves of Doubt, an EP of songs recorded during Alarms in the Heart's Icelandic recording sessions.

== Background and recording ==
After three years of heavy touring following their debut album Shallow Bed, the band chose to record Alarms in the Heart at Sundlaugin, an isolated studio in Iceland near the city of Reykjavík. During their Iceland sessions, the band worked with producer Charlie Hugall and received string arrangements from Icelandic producer Valgeir Sigurðsson. The band would later use extra songs recorded in Iceland for their final EP Hooves of Doubt in November 2015.

To promote the album, the band released a 10-minute documentary film, titled Alarms in the Heart (The Making Of), which chronicles the album's recording and the band's stay in Iceland. Brice Ezell of PopMatters praised the film as "gorgeously shot" and called the scenery of Iceland "particularly stunning".

The band continued recording in their home city of London as they were unsatisfied with the results of the recording sessions in Iceland. During this time, they were dropped by their label, RCA Records, which guitarist Matthew Taylor said was a "blessing in disguise" as it allowed them more time to finish Alarms in the Heart. Recording continued with Hugall and Peter Miles, with the band also visiting Glasgow to work with producer Paul Savage. Violinist and founding band member Will Harvey parted ways with the band during the production of the album; Taylor stated that it was due to the band using more keyboards compared to their prior acoustic-focused sound. Of Harvey's playing in the studio, only that on the track "Vessel" made it onto the final album.

The first single for Alarms in the Heart, "Gethsemane", was released on 16 June 2014 alongside a music video and the announcement of the album. The song's music video was filmed at the Rivoli Ballroom in London, England. The second single, "Everlasting Light", was released on 23 July 2014 with a music video directed by Jake Dypka. A third and final single, "Rollerskate", was released on 9 March 2015 with a live music video of their performance at The Forum in London.

== Composition ==
Alarms in the Heart has been described as an indie rock and folk rock record. Multiple critics felt it was stylistically similar to the band's previous album, Shallow Bed. James Christopher Monger of AllMusic called the album a "blend [of] the bucolic art-pop of Stornoway with the ceiling-peeling arena rock of The Killers." Michael Katzif of WNYC said "Alarms In The Heart further showcases Dry the River’s skill in building quaint, folk hymnals into a chest-thumping choruses and elegant Baroque pop songs into impassioned cascading showstoppers."

The band's songwriter, Peter Liddle, said the album is divided between the slower and more atmospheric songs they recorded in Iceland and the more "visceral" songs they recorded in London. Meggie Morris of Renowned for Sound noted the frequent religious themes in the music, calling the lyrics "immersed in the Catholic liturgical and musical tradition" and comparing the melodies on the album to modal Gregorian chants. The album's third track, "Roman Candle", features vocals from Scottish singer-songwriter Emma Pollock as the band felt it was "a little much" to have Liddle perform the entire song.

== Critical reception ==
Professional ratings
Aggregate scores
Source	Rating
Metacritic	69/100
Review scores
Source	Rating
AllMusic	4/5 stars
DIY	4/5 stars
Entertainment.ie	3.5/5 stars
The Line of Best Fit	7.5/10
musicOMH	2.5/5 stars
NBHAP	3/5 stars

Alarms in the Heart received positive reviews from critics. At Metacritic, which assigns a normalized rating out of 100 to reviews from mainstream critics, the album received an average score of 69, which indicates "generally favorable reviews", based on 6 reviews. Bevis Man of DIY called Alarms in the Heart "immensely enjoyable", considering it "stronger" and "more mature" than Shallow Bed. Man noted the increased level of sonic experimentation compared to its predecessor, calling the band "an enviable force to be reckoned with". Paul Page of Entertainment.ie praised the album as "bigger, brighter, and more ambitious" than Shallow Bed, stating Alarms in the Heart has "a sound to fill stadiums while still somehow managing to remain strikingly intimate." Chloe Mayne of Nothing but Hope and Passion praised Sigurðsson's string arrangements, saying his input is what "breathes wind into the sails" of the album.

Chris White of musicOMH was less favorable, calling the album "disappointing" and criticizing the band's shift from their prior folk elements into "stadium rock territory". He also criticized Hugall's "brash" production, saying his work with mainstream artists such as Ed Sheeran and Florence and the Machine is likely the cause of Dry the River's shift in sound.

== Track listing ==
All lyrics are written by Peter Liddle; all music is composed by Dry the River.

Standard listing
No.	Title	Producer(s)	Length
1.	"Alarms in the Heart"	Charlie Hugall	3:27
2.	"Hidden Hand"	Peter Miles	3:37
3.	"Roman Candle" (featuring Emma Pollock)	Hugall; Miles; Paul Savage	3:50
4.	"Med School"	Miles	3:38
5.	"It Was Love That Laid Us Low"	Hugall	3:38
6.	"Gethsemane"	Hugall; Miles	4:10
7.	"Rollerskate"	Miles	3:20
8.	"Everlasting Light"	Miles	3:14
9.	"Vessel"	Hugall; Miles	5:12
10.	"Hope Diamond" (contains hidden track "Husk")	Hugall; Savage	11:04
Total length:			45:10

== Personnel ==
Credits adapted from the liner notes of Alarms in the Heart.

=== Dry the River ===
- Peter Liddle – guitar, lead vocals
- Matthew Taylor – guitar, keys, backing vocals
- Scott Miller – bass, backing vocals
- Johnathan Warren – drums, percussion

=== Additional personnel ===
- Emma Pollock – guest vocals (track 3)
- Patrick J. Pearson – additional keys (tracks 2, 4, 6, 7, 8)
- Simon Dobson – trumpet (tracks 3, 8)
- William Harvey – violin (track 9)
- Valgeir Sigurðsson – strings and brass arrangement (tracks 1, 3, 5)
- Sigurður Bjarki Gunnarsson – cello (tracks 1, 3, 5)
- Gunnhildur Daðadóttir – violin (tracks 1, 3, 5)
- Sigurður Þorbergsson – trombone (tracks 1, 3, 5)
- Emil Friðfinnsson – French horn (tracks 1, 3, 5)
- Charlie Hugall – production, mixing
- Peter Miles – production, additional production, mixing
- Paul Savage – additional production, mixing
- Guy Davie – mastering
- Jake Casapao – photography

== Chart performance ==
Chart (2014)	Peak position
Scottish Albums (Official Charts)	60
UK Albums (Official Charts)	31
UK Independent Albums (Official Charts)	8
