= Perpetual Motion Machine (13 Engines album) =

Studio album by 13 Engines
- Released: 1993, Canada; 1994, United States
- Studio: Le Studio
- Genre: Alternative rock
- Label: EMI Music Canada; Atlantic
- Producer: John Critchley, Glen Robinson

13 Engines chronology
Ignition (1993)	Perpetual Motion Machine (1993)	Conquistador (1995)

Perpetual Motion Machine is an album by the Canadian band 13 Engines, released in 1993. It was the band's fourth album, and the second one released by a major label. The album's first single was "More".

== Production ==
The album was produced by frontman John Critchley, with help from Glen Robinson. It was recorded at Le Studio, in Morin-Heights, Quebec. Compared to sessions for their previous albums, the band spent a longer period of time in the studio, exploring overdubbing and trying different mixes. The cellist Anne Bourne contributed to the album. "Saviour" is about the Second Coming.

== Critical reception ==
Professional ratings
Review scores
Source	Rating
AllMusic	3/5 stars
Calgary Herald	B
The State	3.5/4 stars

Trouser Press wrote that "the unpretentiously arty album lacked only a marketing gimmick (or a transcendent single, although 'Smoke & Ashes' comes mighty close) to get 13 Engines onto the alt-hit parade." Billboard also praised "Smoke & Ashes", calling it "the perfect two-minute rock song." The Philadelphia Inquirer called the album "much-improved," writing that 13 Engines displayed a "willingness to adapt elements of grunge to their songwriting." The State considered the album "a 14-track trip through the subtlety and simplicity that was once rock 'n' roll."

The Washington Post deemed the album "unadorned folk-rock that suggests, without slavishly imitating, Neil Young and Crazy Horse." The Calgary Herald thought that "ambiguous lyrics are delivered in a Morrison monotone style and then sung in wavering half-whispers, buoyed by guitars that slide from grungy psychedelia to hard-rock backbeats." The Edmonton Journal chose Perpetual Motion Machine as the fourth best Canadian album of 1993, describing it as "energetic, original guitar rock with sneaky hooks and sometimes confusing lyrics."

AllMusic called Perpetual Motion Machine "a record that, while perhaps a bit cleaner sonically than their debut, finds the band still creating a glorious racket."

== Track listing ==
No.	Title	Length
1.	"Bred in the Bone"
2.	"Saviour"
3.	"More"
4.	"Unconscience"
5.	"The Golden Age"
6.	"Smoke & Ashes"
7.	"What If We Don't Get What We Want?"
8.	"Unbound"
9.	"Perpetual Motion Machine"
10.	"Moment of Clarity"
11.	"Dirty Little Rat"
12.	"The Estrangement"
13.	"Going Under"
14.	"Lift You Up"
