= 13 Engines =

Canadian alternative rock band

- Origin: Toronto, Ontario, Canada
- Genres: Alternative rock
- Years active: 1985–1997
- Labels: SBK/Capitol, EMI, Atlantic, Nocturnal Records
- Past members: John Critchley; Grant Ethier; Jim Hughes; Mike Robbins

13 Engines was a Canadian alternative rock band active in the 1980s and 1990s.

== Overview ==
Formed in 1985 as The Ikons, the band consisted of four York University students: vocalist and songwriter John Critchley, guitarist and songwriter Mike Robbins, bassist Jim Hughes and drummer Grant Ethier. They released a self-titled independent cassette in 1986 before changing their name to 13 Engines. This name was a reference to the automobile industry in Windsor, Ontario and Detroit, Michigan, which were the first markets to embrace the band.

They spent a lot of time in Michigan and recorded their first two albums there--Before Our Time in 1987 and Byram Lake Blues in 1989; both were released by the UK label Nocturnal Records. One song from Byram Lake Blues, "Beached", became a college hit and, in 1990, the band was signed to SBK Records in the United States and EMI in Canada.

In 1991, 13 Engines released their major label debut, A Blur to Me Now, which was produced by David Briggs and John Hanlon. The band received airplay for the album's singles "King of Saturday Night" and "Big Surprise". SBK dropped them soon afterward, although it did release an EP called Ignition which was the top singles from the band's next album.

That album was 1993's Perpetual Motion Machine, which was produced by Critchley and released on Atlantic Records. This album was the band's breakthrough in Canada, spawning the hit singles "More", "Bred in the Bone" and "Smoke & Ashes", and led to a spot on The Tragically Hip's Another Roadside Attraction tour. The band also played festivals and toured with Blind Melon, The Watchmen, Moist and The Tea Party.

They followed up in 1995 with Conquistador, which gave them another hit, "Beneath My Hand". While the album is considered to be 13 Engines' finest work, it did not do well commercially.

In 1996, Nocturnal Records released the band's compilation album, Perfect Largeness: The Nocturnal Years.

In June 1997, the band performed during NXNE, performing songs from a finished album. However, the album was never released and the band broke up that year.

In 2017, the Canadian label Artoffact Records released Brave New Waves Session, an EP collecting a live performance from the radio program Brave New Waves.

== Post-breakup ==
Following the break-up of 13 Engines, Critchley continued as a solo artist and, in 2000, recorded the album Crooked Mile. Critchley, Ethier and Hughes went on to careers as producers.

== Discography ==
=== Albums ===
- The Ikons (as The Ikons) (1986), Independent
- Before Our Time (1987), Nocturnal Records, Resonance (Europe)
- Byram Lake Blues (1989), Nocturnal Records
- A Blur to Me Now (1991), (SBK/Capitol)
- Perpetual Motion Machine (1993), Atlantic Records, SBK/Capitol, EMI Canada
- Conquistador (1995), EMI Canada, Nettwerk Records
- Perfect Largeness: The Nocturnal Years (Compilation) (1996), Nocturnal Records

=== EPs ===
- Ignition (1993), SBK/Capitol, EMI Canada
- Brave New Waves Session (2017), Artoffact Records

=== EPs & Singles ===
- "Beached" (1989), Nocturnal Records
- "Big Surprise" (1991), SBK/Capitol
- "King Of Saturday Night" (1991), SBK/Capitol
- "More" (1993), EMI Canada, Atlantic Records
- "Smoke And Ashes" (1993), EMI Canada, Atlantic Records
- "Bred In The Bone" (1993), EMI Canada, Atlantic Records
- "Beneath My Hand" (1995), EMI Canada
- "Personal Golam" / "Waterfall (1995), EMI Canada
- "Tailpipe Blues" (1995), EMI Canada
- "Slow" (1995), EMI Canada

=== Compilation Inclusions ===
- Scoop This (1993), EMI Canada
- Heal It - A Canadian Compilation (1994), EMI Canada
- Have Not Been The Same: The CanRock Renaissance (2012), Pheromone Recordings
- For No Apparent Reason - Sweet Nothing (1987), X Records
