= Shallow Bed =

Studio album by Dry The River
- Released: 5 March 2012 (UK); 17 April 2012 (North America)
- Recorded: 2011
- Genre: Folk rock, indie folk
- Length: 50:35
- Label: RCA, Transgressive

Dry The River chronology
Shallow Bed (2012)	Alarms in the Heart (2014)

Singles from Shallow Bed
- 1. "No Rest" Released: 17 June 2011; 2. "Weights & Measures" Released: 11 November 2011; 3. "The Chambers & the Valves" Released: 24 February 2012; 4. "New Ceremony" Released: 16 April 2012

Shallow Bed is the debut studio album from English folk rock band Dry The River and was released 5 March 2012. The album peaked at number 28 on the UK Albums Chart. The album includes the singles "No Rest", "The Chambers & the Valves" and "New Ceremony".

== Singles ==
- "No Rest" was released as the album's lead single on 17 June 2011.
- "Weights & Measures" was released as the album's second single on 11 November 2011.
- "The Chambers & the Valves" was released as the album's third single on 24 February 2012.
- "New Ceremony" was released as the album's fourth single on 16 April 2012.

== Critical reception ==
Professional ratings
Aggregate scores
Source	Rating
Metacritic	70/100
Review scores
Source	Rating
Beats Per Minute	6/10 stars
The Daily Telegraph	5/5 stars
Digital Spy	4/5 stars
Drowned in Sound	6/10 stars
Gigwise	4/5 stars
musicOMH	4/5 stars
NME	7/10 stars
Rolling Stone	4/5 stars
This Is Fake DIY	4/5 stars

Shallow Bed was well received by music critics. Lewis Corner of Digital Spy gave the album a positive review stating, "Frontman Peter Liddle's smooth and dulcet tones - reminiscent of Brandon Flowers - are able to command both the anthemic stadium fillers and the delicate ballads that reside here. The latter is evident on 'Bible Belt', a song dealing with alcoholic parents, where Liddle's vocal nimbly pirouettes over a soft blend of gentle acoustics and orchestral undertones. What's most exciting is Dry The River's ability to open the lid on a song and let it soar; a prime example being the entangled vocal and guitar building throughout 'No Rest', which gloriously explodes by the track's end. This knack has the potential to deliver sky-blistering live performances that should make them a talking point throughout 2012 and, if we're lucky, well beyond."

== Track listing ==
Standard listing
No.	Title	Length
1.	"Animal Skins"	2:56
2.	"New Ceremony"	4:12
3.	"Shield Your Eyes"	3:40
4.	"History Book"	4:41
5.	"The Chambers & The Valves"	3:10
6.	"Demons"	3:46
7.	"Bible Belt"	4:44
8.	"No Rest"	3:07
9.	"Shaker Hymns"	3:49
10.	"Weights & Measures"	5:04
11.	"Lion's Den"	6:44
12.	"Family"	4:42

Deluxe Version
No.	Title	Length
13.	"Shield Your Eyes" (Live at Lightship95)	3:39
14.	"History Book" (Live at Lightship95)	4:49
15.	"Lion's Den" (Live at Lightship95)	6:19
16.	"Hammer"	3:45
17.	"Night Owls" (Home Demo)	2:51
18.	"Weights & Measures" (Dry the River Summer 2011)	5:06
19.	"No Rest" (Dry the River in New York)	3:52

== Chart performance ==
Chart (2012)	Peak position
Dutch Albums Chart	70
UK Albums Chart	28

== Release history ==
Country	Release date	Format	Label
United Kingdom	2 March 2012	Digital download	Sony Music Entertainment, RCA Records
United Kingdom	5 March 2012	CD	Sony Music Entertainment, RCA Records
