= Drop the Pilot =

1983 single by Joan Armatrading

Single by Joan Armatrading

from the album The Key
- B-side: "Business Is Business"
- Released: 4 February 1983
- Length: 3:41
- Label: A&M
- Songwriter: Joan Armatrading
- Producer: Val Garay

Joan Armatrading singles chronology
"I Wanna Hold You" (1982)	"Drop the Pilot" (1983)	"(I Love It When You) Call Me Names" (1983)

Audio
- "Drop the Pilot" on YouTube

"Drop the Pilot" is a song written and performed by English singer-songwriter Joan Armatrading. It was released by A&M Records on 4 February 1983 as the lead single from her eighth studio album, The Key (1983), and was her third and final UK top 40 hit as of 2026. It reached number 11 in the UK Singles Chart, and spent a total of ten weeks in the Top 40. The song was a hit in Australia and New Zealand, peaking at number six on both national charts, and in South Africa, where it reached number one. The single was Armatrading's only appearance on the US Billboard Hot 100, where it spent six weeks, peaking at number 78 on 25 June 1983.

== Background ==
Unlike the majority of her catalogue, Armatrading purposely wrote "Drop the Pilot" as a potential single. Most of her eighth studio album, The Key, was recorded with producer Steve Lillywhite in 1982. However, when completed, A&M Records, did not think the album was commercial enough and lacked a hit single, particularly for America. They asked Armatrading to come up with some additional, more commercial, material, and she went away and wrote some further songs. A&M commissioned American producer Val Garay to record two tracks with Armatrading. She presented Garay with three or four newly written songs and the pair selected "Drop the Pilot" and "What Do Boys Dream" to work on and record.

Speaking about the song, Armatrading revealed to The Guardian in 2024, "It's not about anybody [in] particular but one person is saying to someone: 'Don't go out with that person; go out with me.' It was just more interesting to say 'drop the pilot' and 'drop the mahout' than 'give up that person'." Armatrading thought of "people who take you places" to write the lyrics of the chorus. She told Bill Flanagan, "I suppose it's because I'm always on an airplane that a pilot was the first person I thought of. Then the elephant rider – the driver."

== Music video ==
The song's accompanying music video was directed by Steve Barron. In the US, the song's accompanying music video achieved medium rotation on MTV.

== Critical reception ==
Upon its release, Radio Luxembourg DJ Rob Jones, writing for the Daily Mirror, called "Drop the Pilot" a "compulsive dance record" on which "attacking bass and drums provide the backdrop to an extremely commercial offering". Lenny Juviski of The Northern Echo praised the song as "punchy Joan at her very best" and believed it would be her biggest hit up to that point in her career. He added, "Her voice has always been tops but this up-tempo chant is just the right vehicle for it." James Belsey of the Bristol Evening Post called it a "swift, surprisingly heavy track from Armatrading" and a "delightful single which might bring her overdue chart success".

A reviewer for the Kilmarnock Standard noted that Armatrading "gets into disco rhythm but doesn't let that interfere with her unmistakable voice which has splinters of both Joan Baez and Nina Simone in its makeup". They added it was "as forceful as anything she's done this past year and certainly commercial". Robin Smith of Record Mirror was mixed in his review, writing that Armatrading "comes over all heavy metal on this Foreigner-like epic". He continued, "I always preferred her dipping all over the place, but a change is as good as a rest as they say."

In the US, Billboard described "Drop the Pilot" as Armatrading's "most accessible single yet" and an "instant singalong, fiercely rhythmic, and makes a terrific setting for one of the most powerful female voices on record". Cash Box wrote, "Long plagued by an inability of radio to categorize her music, Armatrading still awaits the airplay to lift her beyond a large and devoted following. 'Drop the Pilot' provides a forceful rock statement that should do the trick."

== Track listing ==
7-inch single (UK, Europe, North America, Australasia and South Africa) and 12-inch single (UK)

1. "Drop the Pilot" – 3:41
2. "Business Is Business" – 3:08

== Personnel ==
"Drop the Pilot"

- Joan Armatrading – vocals
- Craig Hull – electric guitar
- Tim Pierce – electric guitar
- Steve "Goldie" Goldstein – keyboards
- Bryan Garofalo – bass guitar
- Craig Krampf – drums
- M. L. Benoit – percussion

Production

- Val Garay – production ("Drop the Pilot")
- Steve Lillywhite – production ("Business Is Business")

Other

- Donna Muir – painting
- Jamie Morgan – photography

== Charts ==
=== Weekly charts ===
Chart (1983)	Peak position
Australia (Kent Music Report)	6
Belgium (Ultratop 50 Flanders)	35
Ireland (IRMA)	12
New Zealand (Recorded Music NZ)	6
South Africa (Springbok Radio)	1
UK Singles (Official Charts)	11
US Billboard Hot 100	78
US Mainstream Rock (Billboard)	33
US Cash Box Top 100 Singles	82
US AOR Hot Tracks (Radio & Records)	55

=== Year-end charts ===
Chart (1983)	Position
Australia (Kent Music Report)	27
South Africa (Springbok Radio)	8

== Mandy Moore version ==
"Drop the Pilot"

Single by Mandy Moore

from the album Coverage
- Released: 28 October 2003
- Length: 3:43
- Label: Epic
- Songwriter: Joan Armatrading
- Producer: John Fields

Mandy Moore singles chronology
"Have a Little Faith in Me" (2003)	"Drop the Pilot" (2003)	"Senses Working Overtime" (2004)

Audio video
- "Drop the Pilot" on YouTube

"Drop the Pilot" was covered by American singer Mandy Moore for her third studio album, Coverage (2003). Moore's version was released as the second single from her third album on 28 October 2003 through Epic Records. The song was produced by John Fields.

=== Music video ===
A video was produced as a demo for Kodak's Vision2 500T series motion picture film. It is included on the demo DVD for the Vision2 line of stocks and used as a product example projected from a print at Kodak product screenings. The video was directed by Nick DiBella.
