= Longlegs (soundtrack) =

Longlegs (Original Motion Picture Soundtrack)

Film score by Zilgi
- Released: July 12, 2024
- Recorded: 2023–2024
- Genre: Film score
- Length: 56:33
- Label: Milan
- Producer: Zilgi; Osgood Perkins

Zilgi chronology
Creation Myths (2020)	Longlegs (2024)

Longlegs (Original Motion Picture Soundtrack) is the soundtrack album to the 2024 film Longlegs directed by Osgood Perkins starring Maika Monroe and Nicolas Cage. The film score is composed by Zilgi, with featuring contributions from Eugenio Battaglia, Melody Carrillo and Elizabeth Wight. The soundtrack was released through Milan Records on July 12, 2024, the same day as the film's release.

== Development ==
The film's musical score is composed by Osgood's brother Elvis Perkins, who was credited under the pseudonym Zligi. As the film demanded a soundscape that suited the eerie number, Zligi utilized foreboding synths and warped instrumentation along with sublime sound elements. He closely associated with sound designer and editor Eugenio Battaglia, who also contributes two tracks to the album. Zligi gave him complete freedom to work on the musical pieces and unusually handed him the raw audio files for him to work with.

While associating with the mixing process, Battaglia and Osgood thought of using some parts of his music and reverse them completely, hence while hearing it in reverse, the audiences would listen to the score, the way it was recorded. The main link which he used to hint at him, was him pretending to be Zligi by taking a microphone and whispering Harker's name in the scenes where she turns around and hears whispers. Much of the film involves Longlegs saying Harker's name and trying to reach out her, and as Battaglia wanted the whole film to feel like the crackling of a record, he further put a towel on top of the microphone and massaged it on the windscreen.

The film features three songs of the band T. Rex as an integral part of the film: "Get It On", "Jewel" and "Planet Queen". Osgood chose the band in particular, after watching the Apple TV documentary 1971: The Year That Music Changed Everything, while developing the script and felt the band's weird mismatch between the sounds appealed him more, providing a synergetic blend of "Biblical, demonic poetry and glam rock". Furthermore, Nicolas Cage was coincidentally into the T. Rex band during that same period and having listened to the band songs, felt him fit into the same universe.

== Release ==
Milan Records released the soundtrack on July 12, 2024, the same day as the film. A vinyl edition of the album was published by Mutant on September 20, 2024.

== Reception ==
Sam Podgurny of The Film Scorer wrote "Zilgi’s music on Longlegs is everything a disciple of Mr. Downstairs could want—with a little extra in there for fans of fuzzed-out garage rock". Sam Adams of Slate described it a "tense, droning score". Jacob Oller of Paste described it as "screeching". Tim Grierson of Screen International wrote "Sound designer Eugenio Battaglia and composer Zilgi produce a menacing aural environment, with the occasional inclusion of T. Rex on the soundtrack heightening the unease." Chris Bumbray of JoBlo.com wrote "The sparse score by Zilgi is appropriately dread-inducing."

Regarding the sound design, Matt Cipolla of The Film Stage stated "Eugenio Battaglia’s sound design lends as much temperature to the picture as the visuals do. It also eclipses Zilgi’s score that, in its few occurrences, broadly gestures to The Shining above all else." David Rooney of The Hollywood Reporter wrote "Eugenio Battaglia’s dense sound design is another big plus, dialing up jump scares derived from music or other sonic cues rather than leaning on the usual visual tricks."

== Track listing ==
No.	Title	Artist(s)	Length
1.	"Hell on Earth"		1:16
2.	"Blood Trees"		1:23
3.	"Second Sight"		2:35
4.	"The Horns"		1:19
5.	"Initiation"		2:27
6.	"I’ll Be Your Behemoth"		1:48
7.	"Blades Out"		1:47
8.	"Bible Leaves and the FBI"		2:24
9.	"The Devil’s Delta"		1:44
10.	"Dread Algorithm"		1:42
11.	"Camera by Gloaming"		2:40
12.	"Blue Eyed Bairn"		1:52
13.	"Mother Knows Best"		1:51
14.	"Regression"		2:01
15.	"Mr. Downstairs"		2:43
16.	"Bunch of Basement Noise"		1:26
17.	"He Knows Who You Are"		2:27
18.	"Hail Satan"		2:31
19.	"Ruth’s House"		1:27
20.	"Storytime"		2:54
21.	"To the Dark House"		1:15
22.	"The Bitter End"		3:09
23.	"Water"	Melody Carrillo feat. Elizabeth Wight	3:14
24.	"Observatory"	Eugenio Battaglia	3:27
25.	"Resonance"	Eugenio Battaglia	4:59
Total length:			56:33

== Release history ==
Release history and formats for Mickey 17 (Original Motion Picture Soundtrack)
Region	Date	Format(s)	Label(s)	Ref.
Various	July 12, 2024	Digital download; streaming	Milan Records	
Various	September 20, 2024	LP	Mutant	

== Accolades ==
Award	Date of ceremony	Category	Recipient(s)	Result	Ref.
Fangoria Chainsaw Awards	October 2025	Best Score	Zilgi	Nominated	
Hollywood Music in Media Awards	November 20, 2024	Best Original Score – Horror/Thriller Film	Zilgi	Nominated	
