= Being Elsewhere Mix =

Studio album by Dan Mangan
- Released: August 30, 2024
- Genres: Indie folk; indie rock
- Length: 38:17
- Label: Arts & Crafts

Dan Mangan chronology
Being Somewhere (2022)	Being Elsewhere Mix (2024)	Natural Light (2025)

Being Elsewhere Mix is the eighth album by Canadian singer-songwriter Dan Mangan, released August 30, 2024, on Arts & Crafts Productions. Conceived as a mixtape rather than a traditional studio album, it comprises a mixture of acoustic rerecordings of songs from his prior album Being Somewhere, cover versions of songs by Bob Dylan, Damien Jurado and The Lumineers, and several songs that Mangan had released as non-album singles following Being Somewhere.

Mangan described the album as one that "lives outside the confined pressures of album cohesion. The vision is to embrace the chaos of my differing creative impulses and let them breathe together."

== Singles ==
The album's first official single was "Call Me Up High", although "Say When", "Sleep on the Floor" and "Find New Ways" had previously been released as standalone singles before the album was announced.

== Tour ==
The album was supported with a fall acoustic tour, opening at Knox Hall in Sudbury on October 12.

== Track listing ==
Being Elsewhere Mix track listing
No.	Title	Length
1.	"Call Me Up High"	2:43
2.	"A.M. AM"	3:12
3.	"Just Know It" (Elsewhere version)	2:59
4.	"Four Chords"	3:40
5.	"Find New Ways"	3:34
6.	"Maggie's Farm"	3:58
7.	"Fire Escape" (Elsewhere version)	3:35
8.	"Sleep on the Floor"	3:43
9.	"Say When"	3:11
10.	"All My People" (Elsewhere version)	3:54
11.	"Find New Ways" (acoustic)	3:42
Total length:		38:17
