= (I Love It When You) Call Me Names =

1983 single by Joan Armatrading

Single by Joan Armatrading

from the album The Key
- B-side: "For the Best"
- Released: 6 May 1983
- Length: 4:43 (album version); 3:24 (single version)
- Label: A&M
- Songwriter: Joan Armatrading
- Producer: Steve Lillywhite

Joan Armatrading singles chronology
"Drop the Pilot" (1983)	"(I Love It When You) Call Me Names" (1983)	"What Do Boys Dream" (1983)

Audio
- "(I Love It When You) Call Me Names" on YouTube

"(I Love It When You) Call Me Names" is a song by English singer-songwriter Joan Armatrading, released on 6 May 1983 by A&M Records as the second single from her eighth studio album, The Key (1983). The song was written by Armatrading and produced by Steve Lillywhite.

== Background ==
Armatrading was inspired to write "(I Love It When You) Call Me Names" by two of the musicians in her touring band who were always arguing with one another. Armatrading told Record magazine in 1983, "It's come out as a man and a woman, but I was really looking at two guys. Not two gay guys, just two guys who are friends who tend to treat each other like this, always calling each other names. There's sort of this love/hate relationship between them, but you get the feeling that they really enjoy this thing that they're going through." Armatrading wrote the song in Santa Barbara, California while she was on tour.

== Release ==
"(I Love It When You) Call Me Names" was released as a single in the UK on 6 May 1983. Despite the top 20 success of Armatrading's preceding single, "Drop the Pilot", earlier in the year, "(I Love It When You) Call Me Names" failed to reach the top 100 of the UK singles chart. It did, however, fare better in Australia and New Zealand, where it reached number 20 and number 43 respectively.

== Critical reception ==
Upon its release as a single, Jim Whiteford of The Kilmarnock Standard wrote, "Hot driving bass-led rhythm and subtle synthesizers leave this gem uncluttered and capable of stopping a charging rhino at 50 yards. Top 30 chart stuff and a huge disco sound." Lenny Juviski of The Northern Echo called it a "fast, gutsy, rousing number" that "sees [the] gluey-voiced lady at her best". Frank Edmonds of the Bury Free Press awarded the song an 8 and a half out of 10 rating and wrote, "The Joan Armatrading records I like are the ones which are never hits – and I think this one is fabulous! That probably means you'll never hear of it again." Kirsty McNeill of the NME was negative in her review, stating that she thought "this overpowering masochistic rock, complete with farting bass and painful lead guitar breaks, was the new Saxon single". She added it was "hardly the most tactful way for a 'respected' singer-songwriter to break new ground".

== Track listings ==
7–inch single (UK, the Netherlands and Australasia)

1. "(I Love It When You) Call Me Names" (edited version) – 3:24
2. "For the Best" – 3:29

7–inch single (South Africa)

1. "(I Love It When You) Call Me Names" – 4:23
2. "Everybody Gotta Know" – 3:48

== Personnel ==
"(I Love It When You) Call Me Names"

- Joan Armatrading – vocals, electric guitar
- Daryl Stuermer – electric guitar
- Adrian Belew – electric guitar solo
- Larry Fast – synthesiser
- Tony Levin – bass guitar
- Jerry Marotta – drums

Production

- Steve Lillywhite – production
- Mark Dearnley – engineering

Other

- Jamie Morgan – photography

== Charts ==
Chart (1983)	Peak position
Australia (Kent Music Report)	20
New Zealand (Recorded Music NZ)	43
