= Thief (Dan Mangan album) =

Studio album by Dan Mangan
- Released: November 20, 2020
- Genres: Indie folk, indie rock
- Length: 37:08
- Label: Arts & Crafts
- Producer: Drew Brown

Dan Mangan chronology
More or Less (2018)	Thief (2020)	Being Somewhere (2022)

Thief is the sixth studio album by Canadian singer-songwriter Dan Mangan, released November 20, 2020 on Arts & Crafts Productions. The album is a collection of cover versions of songs by other artists, some but not all of which Mangan had previously released as B-sides.

With the COVID-19 pandemic in Canada limiting a proper concert tour, Mangan promoted the album with an online streamed concert performance on the Side Door Access platform.

Guest musicians on the album included Amy Millan as a duet vocalist on Bob Marley's "Chances Are", and Zeus as the backing band on Elliott Smith's "Waltz 2 (XO)".

== Critical reception ==
Nathan Pike of The Spill Magazine praised the album, writing that "A good cover song ought to sound as if the artist has connected to the beauty that exists in their chosen tune, spending time getting to know it, and then introducing it to some new peaks and valleys as it is made into their own interpretation. Thief, a collection of covers recorded over the last decade and the latest release from Canada’s beloved Dan Mangan, holds true to what a worthy cover can be. These aren’t just cherry-picked tunes, they are songs that have held deeper meaning and weight for Mangan."

Stuart Derdeyn of the Vancouver Sun singled out Mangan's versions of Cake's "Love You Madly" and Robyn's "Hang with Me" as among the album's highlights, noting that Mangan's interpretations placed a whole new emphasis on the romantic or melancholy depth of the lyrics compared to the more upbeat production of the original versions.

== Track listing ==
No.	Title	Original artist	Length
1.	"Losing My Religion"	R.E.M.	4:06
2.	"Love You Madly"	Cake	3:33
3.	"In the Aeroplane Over the Sea"	Neutral Milk Hotel	3:42
4.	"Waltz 2 (XO)"	Elliott Smith	5:20
5.	"Have a Little Faith in Me"	John Hiatt	4:09
6.	"Hang with Me"	Robyn	3:28
7.	"Ex-Factor"	Lauryn Hill	3:56
8.	"Stairway"	Yukon Blonde	4:15
9.	"Chances Are"	Bob Marley	4:39
