= Coverage (album) =

Studio album by Mandy Moore
- Released: October 21, 2003
- Recorded: 2002–2003
- Studios: Mansfield Lodge, The Terrarium, Kevin's House, NRG Recording, Vibatorium, Crackertracks, Chapel Rock
- Genre: Pop
- Length: 46:43
- Label: Epic
- Producer: John Fields

Mandy Moore chronology
Mandy Moore (2001)	Coverage (2003)	The Best of Mandy Moore (2004)

Singles from Coverage
- 1. "Have a Little Faith in Me" Released: July 15, 2003; 2. "Drop the Pilot" Released: October 28, 2003; 3. "Senses Working Overtime" Released: February 10, 2004

Coverage is the third studio album by American singer Mandy Moore. It was released on October 21, 2003, by Epic Records. It is a cover album with 12 covers of 1970s and 1980s songs on which Moore collaborated with producer and song writer John Fields. Coverage was the first studio album by Moore in two years, following her self-titled second studio album Mandy Moore (2001), and was preceded by its lead single "Have a Little Faith in Me", which reached number 39 on Billboard’s Mainstream Top 40.

The album received generally positive reviews from music critics when it was released.

== Background ==
On May 1, 2001, Moore released her self-titled album, Mandy Moore, which had more adult and provocative themes along with the lead single "In My Pocket", but Moore began to get tired of her teen pop style and continuing to go in the direction of and being compared to Christina Aguilera, Jessica Simpson and Britney Spears. In an interview, she said her next album would be more mature than her last, and that she felt more comfortable making it. On the red carpet of the 2003 MTV Video Music Awards, she revealed that her then-upcoming album was a cover album titled Coverage that had covers of 1970s and 1980s songs.

Moore's cover of Carole King's "I Feel the Earth Move" later appeared on the compilation album Love Rocks from LBGT rights supporters.

== Composition ==
The album consists of various covers of 1970s and 1980s songs. The first single, "Have a Little Faith in Me", was written and originally recorded by John Hiatt from his eighth album Bring the Family (1987). The second single, "Drop the Pilot", was written and originally recorded by Joan Armatrading as the first single from her eighth album The Key (1983). The third single, "Senses Working Overtime", was originally recorded by the British band XTC in 1982.

"The Whole of the Moon" was originally recorded by The Waterboys and was released in 1985. "Can We Still Be Friends" was written and originally recorded by Todd Rundgren. Its lyrics describe a strained and ill-fated relationship. The song was also a hit for Robert Palmer in 1979. "I Feel the Earth Move" was originally written and recorded by Carole King. "Mona Lisas and Mad Hatters" was originally recorded by Elton John for his fifth album Honky Château (1972). It was co-written by John with Bernie Taupin and is his take on New York City after hearing a gun go off near his hotel window during his first visit to the city. "Moonshadow" was written and originally recorded by Cat Stevens for his fifth album Teaser and the Firecat (1971). "One Way or Another" was originally recorded by American new wave band Blondie for the band's third album Parallel Lines (1978) and reached No. 24 on the Billboard Hot 100. The song is based on an ex-boyfriend of lead singer Debbie Harry who stalked her after their break-up. "Breaking Us in Two" was written and originally recorded by Joe Jackson for his fifth album Night and Day (1982). "Anticipation" was written and originally recorded by Carly Simon as the title track from her second album of the same name (1971). The song was used in commercials for Heinz Ketchup from the late 1970s into the 1980s. "Help Me" was written, produced and originally recorded by Joni Mitchell for her sixth album Court and Spark (1974). The song was recorded with Tom Scott's L.A. Express.

== Critical reception ==
Professional ratings
Aggregate scores
Source	Rating
Metacritic	64/100
Review scores
Source	Rating
AllMusic	3.5/5 stars
Blender	4/5 stars
Entertainment Weekly	C
Rolling Stone	2/5 stars
Slant Magazine	3/5 stars

The album received generally favorable reviews from music critics. Stephen Thomas Erlewine of AllMusic remarked: "It's refreshing to hear an aspiring pop singer work with a strong set of songs by distinctive writers instead of cookie-cutter professional tunesmiths who only have the charts in mind [...] and while Coverage isn't always successful, it is always admirable and likeable, and certainly puts Moore on the right path for an interesting, successful career."

== Commercial performance ==
In the United States, Coverage debuted at number 14 on the Billboard 200 chart with 53,000 first week sales. It was Moore's highest peak position on the chart. The album spent a total of thirteen weeks on the Billboard 200 chart, it was her third longest charting album on the chart. According to Nielsen SoundScan, Coverage had sold 315,000 copies in the United States, it was Moore's fourth highest selling album in the US.

In Australia, Coverage debuted at number 97 on the ARIA Albums chart with modest sales, It was Moore's lowest charting album in the country.

== Track listing ==
All songs produced by John Fields.

No.	Title	Writer(s)	Length
1.	"Senses Working Overtime" (XTC)	Andy Partridge	4:08
2.	"The Whole of the Moon" (The Waterboys)	Mike Scott	5:01
3.	"Can We Still Be Friends" (Todd Rundgren)	Todd Rundgren	3:38
4.	"I Feel the Earth Move" (Carole King)	Carole King	3:08
5.	"Mona Lisas and Mad Hatters" (Elton John)	Elton John, Bernie Taupin	4:49
6.	"Drop the Pilot" (Joan Armatrading)	Joan Armatrading	3:43
7.	"Moonshadow" (Cat Stevens)	Cat Stevens	2:59
8.	"One Way or Another" (Blondie)	Debbie Harry, Nigel Harrison	3:31
9.	"Breaking Us in Two" (Joe Jackson)	Joe Jackson	4:26
10.	"Anticipation" (Carly Simon)	Carly Simon	3:21
11.	"Help Me" (Joni Mitchell)	Joni Mitchell	3:29
12.	"Have a Little Faith in Me" (John Hiatt)	John Hiatt	4:02
Total length:			46:43

== Personnel ==
- Jim Anton – bass
- Kevin Augunas – bass (electric), engineer
- Tommy Barbarella – synthesizer, piano, organ (Hammond), piano (electric)
- Michael Bland – drums
- Monika Blunder – make-up
- D.J. Bonebrake – vibraphone
- Ken Chastain – bass, percussion, tambourine
- Julius Collins – vocals
- Colleen Conway – hair stylist
- Dorian Crozier – percussion, drums, engineer
- Andy Sturmer - Engineer, Vocals, Drums
- Evan Dando – guitar (acoustic)
- Christina Ehrlich – stylist
- John Fields – bass, guitar, guitar (baritone), guitar (electric), French horn, keyboards, vocals, producer, engineer, string arrangements, mixing, effects
- Dirk Freymuth – guitar
- Loren Gold – piano
- Billy Hawn – percussion
- Eric Heywood – pedal steel
- Kenny Holmen – flute, sax (tenor)
- Dave Jensen – trumpet
- Kathy Jensen – sax (baritone)
- Ameena Maria Khawaja – cello
- Dan Leffler – mixing engineer
- Noah Levy – drums
- Matt Mahaffey – piano, drums, engineer, Chamberlin, effects, Minimoog
- George Scot McKelvey – guitar
- Mandy Moore – main vocals
- Josh Myers – string arrangements
- Danielle Nesmith – violin
- Jason Orris – engineer
- Julian Peploe – art direction, design
- Mike Ruekberg – guitar (acoustic)
- Phil Solem – guitar (acoustic), guitar, mandolin, vocals
- Audrey Solomon – violin
- Steve Strand – trumpet
- Chris Testa – engineer
- Danny Wilde – vocals
- Dan Wilson – vocals
- Jordon Zadorozny – guitar

=== Deluxe edition bonus DVD ===
- Exclusive interview footage and B-roll
- Track-by-track discussion of songs on album
- "Have a Little Faith in Me" music video
- Different cover art

== Charts ==
Chart performance for Coverage
Chart (2003)	Peak position
Australian Albums (ARIA)	97
Canadian Albums (Nielsen SoundScan)	59
US Billboard 200	14
