= Strange Prison =

Studio album by Astral Swans
- Released: 2018
- Genre: Indie rock
- Label: Saved by Vinyl (in North America), Tiny Room Records (in Europe), Moorworks Records (in Japan)
- Producer: Scott Munro (Preoccupations), Paul Chirka, and Matthew Swann, except tracks 2 and 10, produced by Dan Mangan

Astral Swans chronology
| All My Favorite Singers Are Willie Nelson (2015) | Strange Prison (2018) |

Strange Prison is an album by Astral Swans, released in May 2018, described by Exclaim Magazine as "Swann's most sonically exploratory and emotionally resonant release to date," and by BeatRoute Magazine as "brimming with life, full of texture and character while maintaining a laid-back, atmospheric quality".

== Track listing ==
1. "Blow Away"
2. "Controls"
3. "What Are You Gonna Do with Yourself"
4. "Prison Builder"
5. "General Rule"
6. "The Kids Came By and Burned Down the Scene"
7. "Strange Prison"
8. "Free Yourself from All Harm"
9. "I Belong"
10. "Excess"
11. "Sew Their Mouths"
12. "I Wanna See Something Burn"
13. "End Song"

== Personnel ==
All vocals and instrumentation by Matthew Swann, except:

- Dillon Whitfield (Jane Vain and the Dark Matter) – backing vocals (tracks 1, 2); drums (track 6); bass, guitar (track 10)
- Paul Chirka – organ (tracks 1, 7, 9, 11); backing vocals (track 1); strings (track 7)
- Chris Vail – guitar (tracks 1, 11)
- Rena Kozak – vocals (tracks 3, 12)
- Sarah Groot – vocals, keys (tracks 2, 10)
- Joe Ramirez – drums (tracks 3, 7, 8, 9, 11)
- Scott Munro (Preoccupations) – keys (tracks 3, 5, 8, 12); guitar (track 4)
- Dan Gaucher (Fond of Tigers / The October Trio) – drums (tracks 2, 10)
- Dan Mangan – backing vocals, piano, bass synth (track 2)
- Sarah Tigerwing – vocals (track 5)
- Distance Bullock – drums (tracks 3, 9, 11)
- Christina Milinusic – theremin (track 6)
- All songs written by Matthew Swann.
- Produced by Scott Munro (Preoccupations), Paul Chirka, and Astral Swans (except tracks 2 and 10 produced by Dan Mangan).
- All songs mixed by Paul Chirka at The Department of Creativity and Mischief, except for tracks 2 and 10 mixed by Dan Mangan at National Park Studios.
- Mastered by Harris Newman.
- Artwork and design by Gabriel Alan Collins.
