= The October Trio =

- Origin: Vancouver, British Columbia, Canada
- Genres: Jazz
- Years active: 2004–present
- Labels: Cellarlive, Songlines
- Members: Josh Cole; Dan Gaucher; Evan Arntzen

The October Trio is a Canadian jazz trio from Vancouver consisting of Josh Cole (bass), Dan Gaucher (drums), and Evan Arntzen (saxophone). Formed in 2004, the three met as students at Capilano College while studying jazz. Their influences are cited as being diverse, ranging from Vespertine-era Björk to the Wayne Shorter Quartet to local talents.

In March 2005, they became the regular performers at the Rime, a new music hub located in East Vancouver. There, they recorded their first live album, Live at Rime in 2005. The trio released their studio album, Day In, in 2006 and in the same year, earned the title Canadian Broadcasting Corporation's Galaxie Rising Star Award for best new group at the Vancouver International Jazz Festival. The album was also nominated for a 2007 Western Canadian Music award for Jazz Album of the year. After the album, the trio began collaborating with jazz trumpeter Brad Turner in 2007 and released the album Looks Like It's Going to Snow in 2009.

Turner had previously produced Day In and is also the producer for the new record. The album is noted for its lyricism and rich arrangements. One review notes that "it easily and off-handedly incorporates funk and rock elements without becoming a collection that is dominated by a backbeat aesthetic." The band is also noted for its rhythmic complexity, as songwriter Cole enjoys the frequent play with irregular time signatures and unusual phrase lengths. The trio has also opened for Dave Holland and the Monterey Quartet.

The band has performed at the Vancouver International Jazz Festival, the National Jazz Awards in Toronto, the Montreal Jazz Festival, the Seattle Earshot Jazz Festival, the Portland Jazz Festival, the Calgary Jazz Festival, and the Edmonton Jazz Festival. They have also toured eastern Canada and the United States in June 2010 to promote their latest recording.

== Discography ==
- Live at Rime (2005)
- Day In (CellarLive/2006) 2007 Western Canadian Music Award Nominee
- Looks Like Its Going To Snow (Songlines/2009) 2009 Western Canadian Music Award Nominee
- New Dream (Songlines) 2012
