= Being Somewhere =

Studio album by Dan Mangan
- Released: October 28, 2022
- Genres: Indie folk, indie rock
- Length: 31:12
- Label: Arts & Crafts
- Producer: Drew Brown

Dan Mangan chronology
Thief (2020)	Being Somewhere (2022)	Being Elsewhere Mix (2024)

Being Somewhere is the seventh studio album by Canadian singer-songwriter Dan Mangan, released October 28, 2022 on Arts & Crafts Productions.

The album was produced and recorded remotely due to the COVID-19 pandemic, with Mangan stating that "The hard part was waiting; sometimes it took six weeks to resolve an issue that could have taken twenty minutes had we been together in a room. But Drew [Brown]'s dedication and talent cannot be understated, and this music doesn't sound like anything else I'm hearing these days."

The album was preceded by the preview singles "In Your Corner (for Scott Hutchison)", a tribute to Frightened Rabbit bandleader Scott Hutchison following his death in 2018, in April, and "Fire Escape", the video for which starred actor Steven Ogg as a personification of a self-critical inner voice taunting and tormenting Mangan, in July. A third preview song, "Just Know It", was released concurrently with the announcement of the album.

== Awards ==
The album received a Juno Award nomination for Adult Alternative Album of the Year at the Juno Awards of 2023, and was shortlisted for the 2023 Polaris Music Prize.

The video for "Fire Escape" won the Audience Award at the 2023 Prism Prize.

== Track listing ==
All tracks are written by Dan Mangan and Drew Brown.

Being Somewhere track listing
No.	Title	Length
1.	"All My People"	3:34
2.	"Fire Escape"	3:43
3.	"Easy"	3:53
4.	"Just Know It"	2:13
5.	"All Roads"	3:37
6.	"In Your Corner (For Scott Hutchison)"	3:16
7.	"Long After"	3:44
8.	"Wish I Was Here"	3:01
9.	"No Tragedy Please"	4:11
Total length:		31:12

== Personnel ==
Musicians

- Dan Mangan – vocals (all tracks), guitar (tracks 1–5, 7–9), percussion (1), synthesizer (1, 2, 7, 8), programming (3), piano (6)
- Susumu Mukai – guitar (1–3, 5, 7), percussion (1, 3), programming (1, 3, 7), bass guitar (2, 5), synthesizer (2, 5, 7)
- Drew Brown – programming (1–3, 5, 7–9), synthesizer (1–5, 7–9), bass guitar (5, 7)
- Joey Waronker – drums (2, 5, 7), percussion (2, 5, 7)
- Jason Falkner – guitar (2, 5); bass guitar, synthesizer (5)
- Dave Okumu – bass guitar (3)
- Thomas Bartlett – Mellotron, piano (4, 8); synthesizer (8)
- Kevin Drew – synthesizer (4)
- Ohad Benchetrit – synthesizer (4)
- Mary Lattimore – harp (6, 9)
- Gwilym Gold – piano (6)
- Lexx – programming (7)

Technical

- Drew Brown – production, mixing (all tracks); engineering (6)
- David Ives – mastering (all tracks), mixing (1, 4)
- Lexx – mixing (3, 5, 7)
- Darrell Thorp – mixing (6, 9)
- John Raham – engineering (6)
