= Nice, Nice, Very Nice =

Studio album by Dan Mangan
- Released: August 11, 2009
- Genre: Indie rock
- Length: 44:56
- Label: Arts & Crafts Productions

Dan Mangan chronology
Postcards & Daydreaming (2005)	Nice, Nice, Very Nice (2009)	Oh Fortune (2011)

Nice, Nice, Very Nice is the second album by Canadian singer-songwriter Dan Mangan, released on August 11, 2009. The album was a shortlisted nominee for the 2010 Polaris Music Prize.

The album's title is a quotation from a poem contained in American author Kurt Vonnegut's 1963 novel Cat's Cradle.

Two tracks on the album were released as singles and had music videos produced: "Robots", directed by Mike Lewis, and "Sold", directed by Sean Devlin.

A tenth-anniversary deluxe edition of the album was released in 2019, featuring demo versions of many of the album's songs.

== Track listing ==
No.	Title	Length
1.	"Road Regrets"	4:31
2.	"Robots"	4:04
3.	"The Indie Queens Are Waiting"	3:38
4.	"Sold"	3:49
5.	"Fair Verona"	5:49
6.	"You Silly Git"	3:45
7.	"Tina's Glorious Comeback"	2:41
8.	"Et les mots croisés"	3:22
9.	"Some People"	3:37
10.	"Pine for Cedars"	3:17
11.	"Basket"	3:53
12.	"Set the Sails"	2:30
