= Ash Wednesday (album) =

Studio album by Elvis Perkins
- Released: 2006 (Independent self-release); February 20, 2007 (US); July 9, 2007 (UK)
- Recorded: 2006
- Genre: Contemporary folk; indie folk
- Length: 50:52
- Label: XL Recordings
- Producer: Ethan Gold

Elvis Perkins chronology
Ash Wednesday (2006)	Elvis Perkins in Dearland (2009)

Professional ratings
Review scores
Source	Rating
Allmusic	3.5/5 stars
The Guardian	4/5 stars
Pitchfork Media	(7/10)
PopMatters	(8/10)
Stylus Magazine	(A−)
Drowned in Sound	(7/10)
Rolling Stone	3.5/5 stars
The Skinny	4/5 stars

Ash Wednesday is the debut studio album by singer songwriter Elvis Perkins, released on February 20, 2007, on XL Recordings. It is a chronologically sequenced album of songs written before (Tracks 1 to 6) and after (Tracks 7 to 11) the death of his mother, who died on 9/11. In a 2009 interview, Perkins states that the album "[has] been made out to be bleaker than it really is, [...] there were moments of hopefulness on Ash Wednesday too."

Regarding the album's title, Perkins states that it:

refers to being left on Wednesday with nothing but ash, because [my mother] died on a Tuesday – being left with ash on September 12. That was also the day my father died, September 12 [1992, of complications from AIDS]. It first occurred to me on Ash Wednesday itself – my consciousness was largely ruled by having lost my mother six months previously.

"All the Night Without Love" was the lead single off the album; "Moon Woman II" appears on the Fast Food Nation soundtrack, and "While You Were Sleeping" was featured in a season 4 episode of The O.C.. The album was released on XL Records and includes backing vocals by Ariana Lenarsky, Shana Levy of indie band Let's Go Sailing, and others.

== Track listing ==
1. "While You Were Sleeping"
2. "All The Night Without Love"
3. "May Day!"
4. "Moon Woman II"
5. "It's Only Me"
6. "Emile's Vietnam in the Sky"
7. "Ash Wednesday"
8. "The Night & The Liquor"
9. "It's a Sad World After All"
10. "Sleep Sandwich"
11. "Good Friday"

== Chart performance ==
Chart (2007)	Peak position
French Albums (SNEP)	193
