= Gordon Grdina =

Canadian guitarist

Gordon Grdina is a Canadian guitarist from Vancouver, British Columbia, whose style blends jazz, world music and avant-garde influences. He is most noted for his 2018 album China Cloud, which won the Juno Award for Instrumental Album of the Year at the Juno Awards of 2019.

In addition to fronting his own Gordon Grdina Trio and Gordon Grdina Septet, he has also recorded and performed with Peregrine Falls, Haram and Qalandar, and as a guitarist and songwriting collaborator with Dan Mangan. With Mangan, Kenton Loewen and John Walsh, he was a SOCAN Songwriting Prize nominee in 2012 for "Post-War Blues" from Mangan's album Oh Fortune.

He received a second Juno nomination for Instrumental Album of the Year for Prior Street at the Juno Awards of 2021.
