= Emily Steinwall =

Canadian saxophonist and composer

Emily Steinwall is a Canadian saxophonist, composer, and singer.

== Career ==
Steinwall toured as a backing vocalist for Alessia Cara, and performed as a solo artist in jazz clubs around Toronto, Ontario, before releasing her full-length debut album Welcome to the Garden in March 2021. She was the 2022 winner of the SOCAN Songwriting Prize in the English category, for her song "Welcome to the Garden".
