= More or Less (album) =

Studio album by Dan Mangan
- Released: November 2, 2018
- Genres: Indie folk, indie rock
- Length: 38:19
- Label: Arts & Crafts
- Producer: Drew Brown

Dan Mangan chronology
Club Meds (2015)	More or Less (2018)	Thief (2020)

More or Less is the fifth studio album by Canadian singer-songwriter Dan Mangan, released November 2, 2018 on Arts & Crafts Productions.

The album's creative process was marked in part by Mangan's period of self-doubt, following the release of his prior album Club Meds and the birth of his second child, about whether he wanted to continue his career in music at all. He has described the album's overall thematic arc as "realizing that you have to feed your kids, while at the same time realizing that, in 2019, there is almost nothing less cool than a 36-year-old white dad."

During the recording process, Mangan's car was robbed; after a discouraging day dealing with police and bureaucrats, he returned to the studio and unexpectedly met Paul McCartney there. McCartney listened to Mangan's "Lay Low", and offered some suggestions on how to complete the song instrumentally.

Adam Feibel of Exclaim! rated the album 8 out of 10, writing that "This is an album that sounds like a concert for one — he's spilling his heart to you, and there's no mistaking it. There's little room for interpretation in his words; this is what's on his mind. And on the strength of songs like the bedside lullaby "Just Fear" or the stunning, heart-melting piano ballad "Fool for Waiting," it hits you in those tender, sensitive spots that you forgot were there."

The album was a Juno Award nominee for Adult Alternative Album of the Year at the Juno Awards of 2019.

== Track listing ==
No.	Title	Length
1.	"Lynchpin"	4:02
2.	"Peaks & Valleys"	3:49
3.	"Just Fear"	3:52
4.	"Lay Low"	3:17
5.	"Cold in the Summer"	3:29
6.	"Troubled Mind"	3:07
7.	"Fool for Waiting"	4:03
8.	"Can't Not"	4:08
9.	"Never Quiet"	3:57
10.	"Which Is It"	4:35
