= Matthew Swann (musician) =

Canadian singer

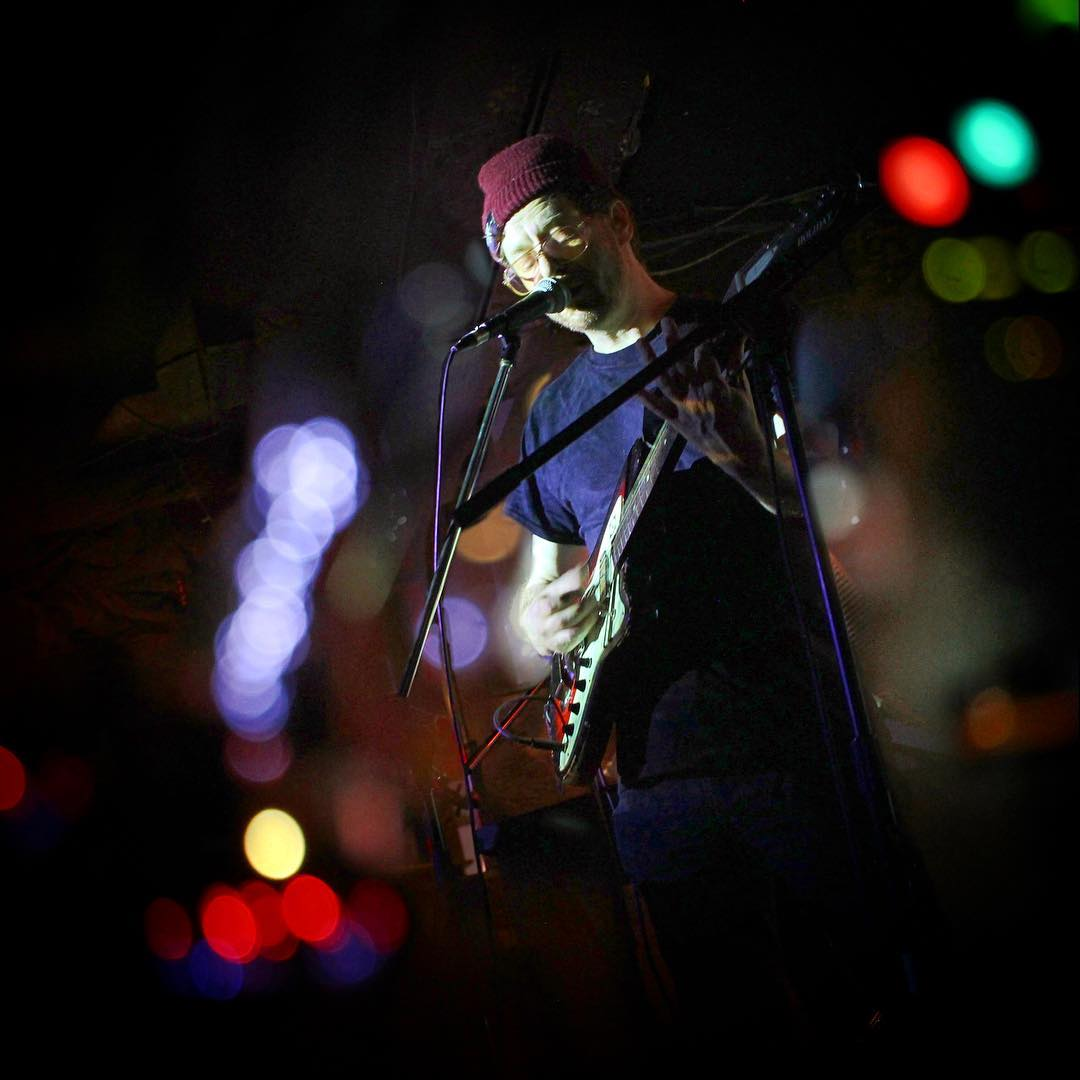
- Astral Swans Live at Broken City in Calgary

Background information
- Born: Calgary, Alberta
- Origin: Canada
- Genres: psych folk, lo-fi
- Years active: 2010–present
- Labels: Madic Records, Arts & Crafts
- Website: http://www.madicrecords.com/astralswans/

Matthew Swann, performing under the name Astral Swans, is a Canadian singer-songwriter from Calgary, Alberta. His music style has been described as "introspective late 60s folk à la Nick Drake filtered through an avant-garde 90s lens." His 2015 debut album, All My Favorite Singers Are Willie Nelson, released on Dan Mangan's Madic Records, an imprint of Arts & Crafts Productions, was described by VICE as "a stark, beautiful project [...] steeped in 60s psych-folk mythology and loner punk iconography." His second album, Strange Prison, was released in May 2018 on Saved By Vinyl and Tiny Room Records. In 2021, Swann released a self-titled third album featuring Julie Doiron, also on Saved By Vinyl and Tiny Room Records. He has since released split EPs with Chad VanGaalen in 2023 and with Julie Doiron in 2024. Previously Matthew Swann was a member of Hot Little Rocket and Extra Happy Ghost!!!

== Discography ==
=== Studio albums ===
- 2015: All My Favorite Singers Are Willie Nelson (Madic Records / Arts & Crafts Productions)
- 2018: Strange Prison (Saved By Vinyl / Tiny Room Records / Moorworks)
- 2021: Astral Swans (Saved By Vinyl / Tiny Room Records / Moorworks)

=== EPs ===
- 2014: We Went to Europe and Conquered Death (tour EP)
- 2019: Strange Prison (Child Actress Remixes) (self-released)
- 2023: Split (with Chad VanGaalen) (Stoner Bird Records)
- 2024: Split 2 (with Julie Doiron) (Stoner Bird Records / Tiny Room Records)

=== Singles ===
- 2014: "You Carry A Sickness / Park Street" (Madic Records / Arts & Crafts Productions)
- 2018: "Controls" (Saved By Vinyl / Tiny Room Records)
- 2018: "What Are You Gonna Do With Yourself" (Saved By Vinyl / Tiny Room Records)

=== Compilations ===
- 2015: Good People Rock: A Yellow Bird Project Covers Compilation (Madic Records / Arts & Crafts Productions)
