= Elvis Perkins =

American musician (born 1976)

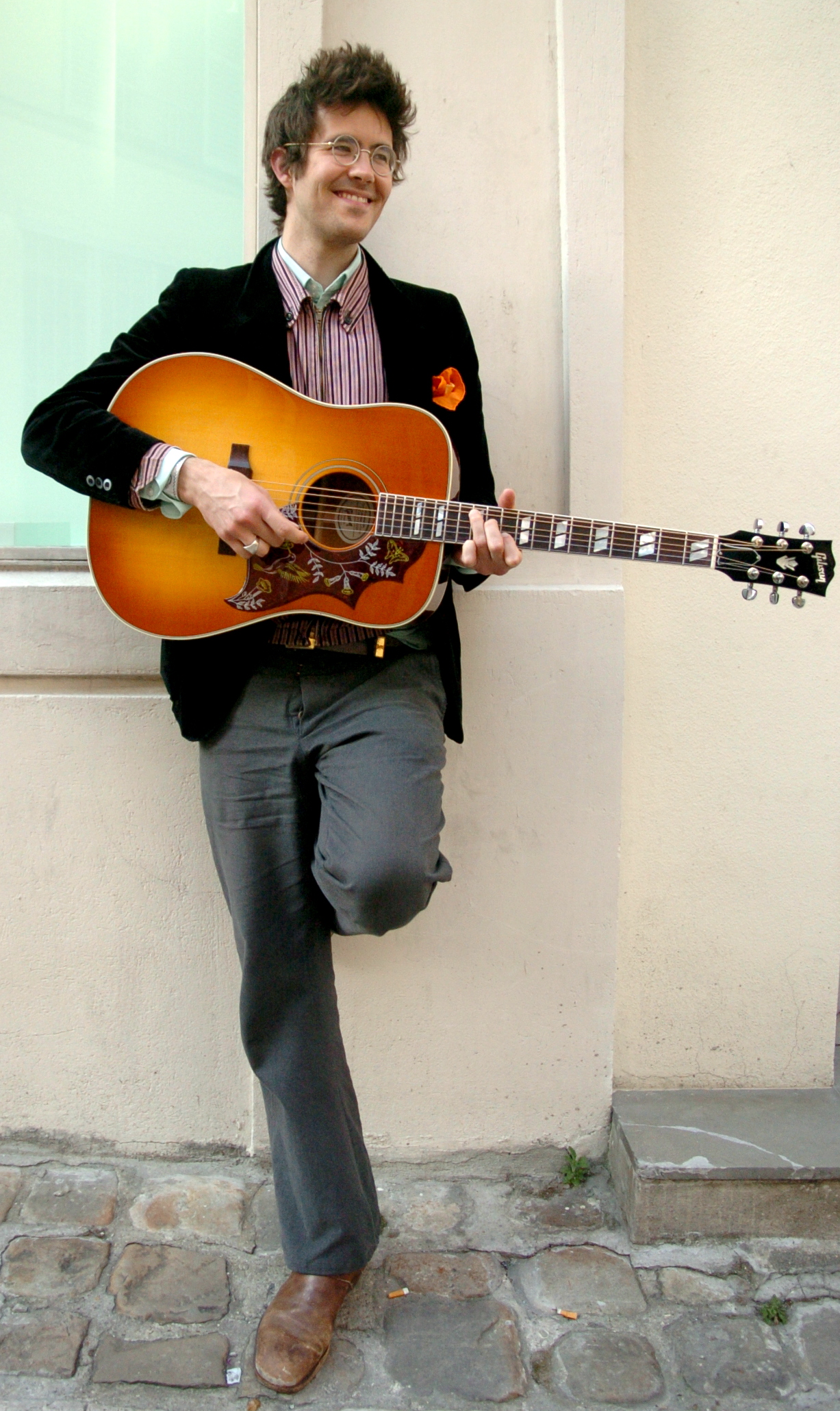
- Perkins in 2007
- Born: Elvis Brooke Perkins; February 9, 1976 (age 50); New York City, U.S.
- Occupations: Musician; singer
- Parents: Anthony Perkins (father); Berry Berenson (mother)
- Relatives: Osgood Perkins (brother); Osgood Perkins (grandfather); Marisa Berenson (aunt); Elsa Schiaparelli (great-grandmother)
- Musical career
- Genres: Indie folk; contemporary folk; film score; folk rock
- Instruments: Vocals; guitar; harmonica
- Labels: MIR; XL
- Website: www.elvisperkinssound.net

Elvis Brooke Perkins (born February 9, 1976) is an American musician. He released his debut studio album, Ash Wednesday, in 2007. He subsequently toured in support of the album with his band Elvis Perkins in Dearland, composed of Perkins alongside multi-instrumentalists Brigham Brough, Wyndham Boylan-Garnett and Nick Kinsey. The band released its self-titled debut, Elvis Perkins in Dearland, in 2009.

The band formed in Providence, Rhode Island around 2004 when Perkins moved to the East Coast upon completing Ash Wednesday, although the members have been friends and collaborators for many years.

== Early life ==
Perkins is the son of actor Anthony Perkins (1932–1992), and photographer and actress Berry Berenson (1948–2001). He was named after Elvis Presley. He was raised in Los Angeles and Manhattan with his older brother, actor and director Osgood Perkins. Perkins is a great-grandson of the fashion designer Elsa Schiaparelli, who was a great-niece of Giovanni Schiaparelli, the Italian astronomer who believed he had discovered the supposed canals of Mars, and a nephew of the actress Marisa Berenson, Berry's sister. His paternal grandfather, Osgood Perkins, was also an actor. His maternal great-grandfather was Wilhelm de Wendt de Kerlor, a theosophist and psychic medium. His mother was a great-grandniece of art expert Bernard Berenson (1865–1959), whose sister Senda (1868–1954) was an athlete and educator and one of the first two women elected to the Basketball Hall of Fame. Perkins attended Brown University, in Providence, Rhode Island, after graduating from high school at the Harvard-Westlake School in 1994. Perkins' father died of AIDS in 1992 and his mother died in the September 11 terrorist attacks.

Perkins took to music at an early age, briefly learning the saxophone before picking up the guitar in high school and taking lessons with Prescott Niles, one-time bassist for The Knack. While he played in rock bands, Perkins developed an interest in the classical guitar, and began to compose music in both idioms.

== Career ==
Debut album Ash Wednesday was produced and arranged by recording artist and composer Ethan Gold, independently released in 2006, and subsequently released February 20, 2007, by XL Recordings.

In 2008, Perkins in Dearland recorded a cover of the Sacred Harp song "Weeping Pilgrim" for Awake My Soul, Help Me to Sing the soundtrack to the movie Awake My Soul.

His band released its debut album, Elvis Perkins in Dearland, on March 10, 2009.

His song "Doomsday" from the Doomsday EP appeared on the second-season premiere of the HBO series Enlightened.

In 2009, he worked with the Yellow Bird Project to create a T-shirt to raise money for the World Wildlife Fund. In the same year, on September 2, he performed an acoustic benefit concert in New York City at the Housing Works Bookstore Café to help promote the project's first publication.

On February 24, 2015, Perkins released his third full-length album, I Aubade, on his newly established label MIR. It was manufactured and distributed by the music division of Isolation Network, INGrooves, and available outside the US on April 20, 2015. He toured in support of I Aubade in 2015.

French indie label Microcultures released a session in October 2016 that was recorded for France Musique Radio's Label Pop, hosted by music journalist Vincent Theval. The album featured the first incarnation of his I Aubade touring band, multi-instrumentalists Mitchell Robe and Danielle Aykroyd, a songwriter who goes by the pseudonym Vera Sola. Sola credits the launch of her career to Perkins' support and encouragement.

In recent years, Perkins has been collaborating with his brother, Osgood, on scores for the latter's films. The critically acclaimed score to The Blackcoat's Daughter was released on DeathWaltz Recordings in March 2017. The New York Times wrote: "The Blackcoat's Daughter bewitches with silky-smooth camera movements and a rolling, reverberating musical score (by Elvis Perkins, the director's brother)." Matt Fagerholm wrote of it that the score set the perfect atmospheric tone for the film. In 2024, Perkins wrote the score for the horror feature film Longlegs under the pseudonym Zilgi. The soundtrack album was released by Milan Records on July 12, 2024.

== Discography ==
=== Albums ===
- Ash Wednesday (February 20, 2007)
- Elvis Perkins in Dearland (March 10, 2009)
- I Aubade (February 24, 2015)
- Creation Myths (October 2, 2020)

=== Soundtracks ===
- I Am the Pretty Thing That Lives in the House (October 28, 2016)
- The Blackcoat's Daughter (March 31, 2017)
- Longlegs (as Zilgi) (July 12, 2024)

=== Singles ===
- "While You Were Sleeping" (July 16, 2007)
- "All the Night Without Love" (November 20, 2007)

=== EPs ===
- "The Doomsday EP" (October 20, 2009)
- "Label Pop Session EP" (November 4, 2016)
