= Dan Mangan =

Canadian musician (born 1983)

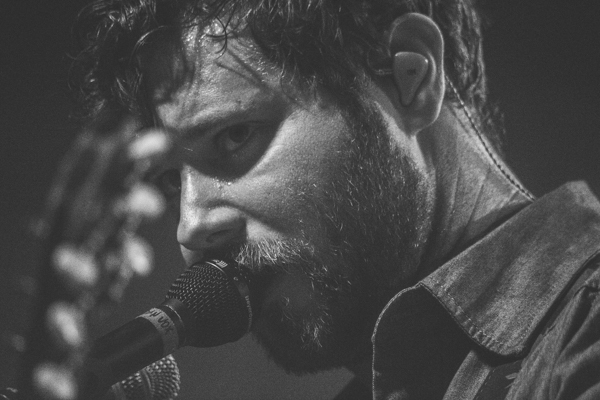

Background information
- Born: Daniel Mangan; April 28, 1983 (age 43); Smithers, British Columbia, Canada
- Origin: Vancouver, British Columbia, Canada
- Genres: Indie rock, folk
- Occupations: Musician, singer-songwriter
- Instruments: Vocals, guitar, piano, keyboards, whistling
- Years active: 2003–present
- Labels: Arts & Crafts, City Slang, Create/Control, File Under: Music, Caroline
- Website: www.danmanganmusic.com

Daniel Mangan (born April 28, 1983) is a Canadian musician. He has won two Juno awards and has toured extensively throughout North America, Europe and Australia, having released 5 studio LPs and numerous EPs and singles. He has scored for feature film, as well as television for Netflix and AMC. He is also a co-founder of Side Door, a marketplace platform connecting artists with alternative venue spaces for in-person & online shows.

== Career ==
=== Early work ===
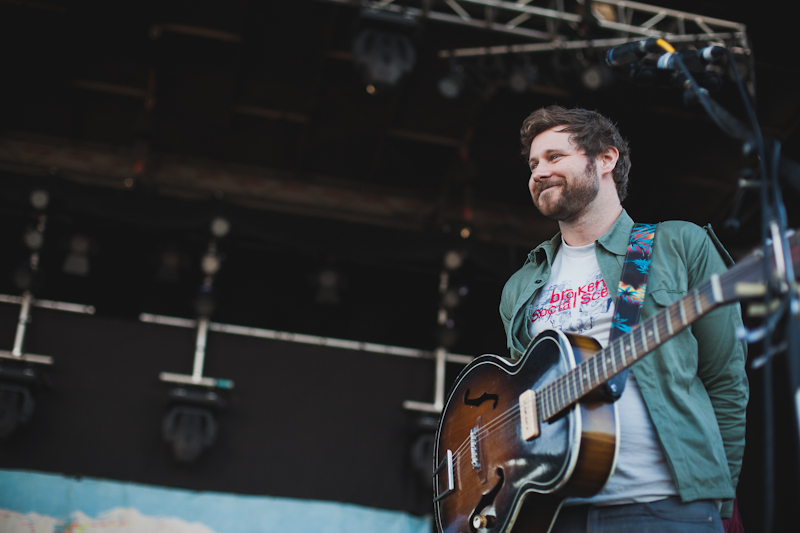
Dan Mangan performing at Rifflandia Festival 2012 in Victoria, BC.

In 2003, at 20 years old, Mangan completed his first set of recordings: an EP of simply recorded acoustic songs called All At Once. Five hundred copies were pressed and sold or given away throughout the Vancouver area. With a bank loan and a small community of musicians who would offer cheap or free sessions, Mangan recorded Postcards & Daydreaming in the summer of 2005 with producer Daniel Elmes and good friend Simon Kelly. Mangan released the album independently at first, selling the album online and at live shows. In July 2007, Vancouver-based independent record label File Under: Music picked up the LP and re-released the album with new artwork and an extra track, "Ash Babe". The following March, the record was released in Australia by ABC/Warner.

=== Nice, Nice, Very Nice ===
In March 2009, Mangan's album Nice, Nice, Very Nice was recorded in Toronto at Green Door Studios with producer John Critchley, and featured an assortment of other Canadian artists such as Veda Hille, Justin Rutledge, Mark Berube, Hannah Georgas and members of Said The Whale, Major Maker, and Elliott Brood. The album name was inspired by a line from American novelist Kurt Vonnegut's book Cat's Cradle, while musically Nice, Nice, Very Nice has been compared to Chad VanGaalen and Bon Iver. The first two singles from his second full-length, "Robots" and "Road Regrets" earned airplay on local Vancouver radio stations, as well as on satellite radio stations such as The Verge and CBC Radio 3.

In September 2009, Mangan was awarded "Artist of the Year" at the Verge Music Awards. In 2010, Nice, Nice, Very Nice was licensed and released by Toronto-based independent record label Arts & Crafts in the United States and Europe (via City Slang). The album was shortlisted for the Polaris Music Prize. Nice, Nice, Very Nice was also awarded "iTunes Album Of The Year" for the Singer/Songwriter category and won three Western Canadian Music Awards for "Independent Album Of The Year", "Roots/Solo Album Of The Year" and "Songwriter Of The Year". "Robots" was named "Best Song" by the CBC Radio 3 BUCKY Awards.

On November 15, 2019, Dan Mangan and Arts & Crafts released the 10th Anniversary Deluxe Edition of Nice, Nice, Very Nice. The 2-LP vinyl collection features previously unreleased demos and b-sides. The package includes an essay by Mangan about making the album and its commercial success.

=== Oh Fortune ===
Throughout 2010 and 2011, Mangan began collaborating with musicians from Vancouver's experimental music scene. Enlisting drummer Kenton Loewen (Mother Mother, Submission Hold, Gordon Grdina Trio), bassist John Walsh (Brasstronaut) and guitarist Gordon Grdina (Gord Grdina Trio, Haram, East Van Strings) opened up relationships with other members of the city's avant-garde free-jazz community. As the ensemble worked toward a third LP, they began collaborating and touring with a large group of musicians who would sub in and out of the band including trumpeter JP Carter (Fond of Tigers, Destroyer), violinist Jesse Zubot (Fond of Tigers, Hawksley Workman, Tanya Tagaq), pianist Tyson Naylor and cellist Peggy Lee (Mary Margaret O'Hara, Wayne Horvitz, Veda Hille). Mangan asked Seattle's Eyvind Kang (Bill Frisell, Beck, Laurie Anderson) to write orchestral arrangements for the forthcoming recordings.

Oh Fortune was recorded over six months throughout the 2010-11 winter with producer Colin Stewart (Black Mountain, Ladyhawk, Yukon Blonde), the band recorded in short spurts at The Hive Creative Labs between tours and at Mangan's own home, coined "National Park Studios". It was released in September, 2011 in North America by Arts & Crafts, with releases in the following months in Europe by City Slang and in Australia via ABC. The album received extensive critical acclaim internationally and demonstrated the beginning of a new, more experimental era in Mangan's musical career.

In November 2011, Mangan was the subject of the CBC documentary What Happens Next?, directed and produced by Brent Hodge and Jon Siddall. It follows Mangan in the lead up to his sold-out show at the Orpheum Theatre in Vancouver.

At the 2012 Juno Awards, Mangan was awarded New Artist of the Year and Alternative Album of the Year for Oh Fortune, and was also nominated for Songwriter of the Year and Video of the Year for the music video for "Rows of Houses", directed by Jon Busby.

Oh Fortune was also long-listed for the 2012 Polaris Music Prize and received three Western Canadian Music Awards for "Rock Album of the Year", "Independent Album of the Year", and "Songwriter of the Year". To boot, "Rows of Houses" was named "Best Song" by the CBC Radio 3 Bucky Awards. Mangan has won six Buckys to date, the most winning artist in the award's history, and is the only artist to win "Best Song" more than once.

=== Club Meds ===
Focusing less on recruited orchestral performances and more on core band contribution, Mangan and his band began recording in late 2013 what would eventually be his 4th LP, Club Meds, released January 2015 (Arts & Crafts / City Slang / Create/Control). Throughout the process, the ensemble decided to release the album under the moniker Dan Mangan + Blacksmith, highlighting and finally labelling the creative contributions from Grdina, Loewen, Walsh, Naylor, Carter and Zubot.

Club Meds was met with a wildly positive critical reception but a less overall popular one than Oh Fortune. The album received 4 Stars from The Guardian, The Observer & Q, and 8/10 from Drowned In Sound & Uncut, leading to a Metacritic score of 79. Alexis Petridis featured the LP as a must-hear album and Guitarist says of Club Meds, "Just 13 days into 2015, Dan Mangan + Blacksmith fired a compelling early salvo in the album of the year stakes." and one Canadian blogger writes, "Club Meds is singlehandedly proving that the LP format is not only alive, but worth fighting for. It is proof that a well crafted record is more than a collection of well crafted songs. Club Meds is a unified whole, tackling some of the most important problems in our collective lives. It is not simply the best album of 2015, but one of the most emotionally compelling albums of the last decade."

=== Unmake EP ===
Unmake, released digitally June 17, 2016, was a collection of four simple home recordings and the single "Race To The Bottom" featuring drummer Loel Campbell (Wintersleep, Holy Fuck) which was recorded at Afterlife Studios in Vancouver, BC and produced by John Raham. The five song EP features a cover of Robyn's "Hang With Me", revisited stripped-down versions of "Kitsch" and "Forgetery" from Club Meds (The latter featuring Tegan Quin of Tegan and Sara) and the song "Whistleblower", a B-side initially recorded with Blacksmith in 6/8 time signature for Club Meds, but re-worked acoustically in 4/4.

=== More or Less ===
In the fall of 2018, Mangan released his fifth full length, More or Less, on Arts & Crafts and City Slang. The album featured production and mixing by Drew Brown (Beck, Charlotte Gainsbourg, Blonde Redhead), with producer Simone Felice (Lumineers, Vance Joy, Jade Bird) producing two songs ("Fool For Waiting" and "Troubled Mind"), which were mixed and engineered by Ryan Hewitt (Lumineers, Avett Brothers, Vance Joy).

Adam Feibel wrote for Exclaim! Magazine, "In stark contrast with the intricate, full-bodied arrangements of Mangan's last couple records, More or Less is so deliberately soft, warm, cozy and minimal that it makes even Nice, Nice, Very Nice sound loud and busy." Feibel goes on to say, "The sleeper hit here is "Lay Low," a song about taking time for yourself that, fittingly, features almost nothing but Mangan's own voice — and even then it's barely more than a whisper. It could be chilling if it wasn't so comforting. And while "Troubled Mind" is undoubtedly boisterous, it's the outlier." About "Troubled Mind" Mangan has said "...it's funny. It's pretty upbeat, but the lyrical content is not exactly sunny, shiny or lovey-dovey, so at first you never know how it's gonna be received...it's really cool to see people gravitate towards it."

About the album as a whole, Mangan says, "witnessing birth, and in some ways rebirth. It's about feeling disconnected from a popular identity and becoming acclimated to a new one. It's about raising kids in a turbulent world. It's about unanswerable questions and kindness and friendship and fear."

In April 2019, Mangan, "the man known as the nicest guy on the Vancouver music scene" performed two songs ("Troubled Mind" and "Just Fear") from the album on Jimmy Kimmel Live!

=== Being Somewhere ===
In April 2022 he released the non-album single "In Your Corner (for Scott Hutchison)", a tribute to Frightened Rabbit bandleader Scott Hutchison following his death in 2018. He followed up in July with "Fire Escape", the video for which starred actor Steven Ogg as a personification of a self-critical inner voice taunting and tormenting Mangan.

Both songs were eventually announced as part of the tracklisting for his seventh studio album, Being Somewhere. The album was released in 2022, and was shortlisted for the 2023 Polaris Music Prize.

In 2024 he released Being Elsewhere Mix, an album inspired by mixtapes which blended rerecorded acoustic versions of some songs from Being Somewhere with several songs he had already released as standalone singles, including "Say When", "Sleep on the Floor" and "Find New Ways".

=== Scoring work ===
After the touring cycle for Oh Fortune, the band took a short hiatus. Dan became a father during this time and scored a soundtrack with Jesse Zubot for the feature film Hector and the Search for Happiness (Simon Pegg, Rosamund Pike, Christopher Plummer, Toni Collette, Stellan Skarsgård, Jean Reno, directed by Peter Chelsom). For their work, Mangan and Zubot were nominated for a Canadian Screen Award in the category of Best Original Score. In that same year, Dan was also nominated for Best Original Song for Wants, a song he contributed to the film The Valley Below.

Between the Club Meds and More or Less album cycles, Mangan scored the music for the Netflix animated show, Hilda, including the ending theme, as well as the CBC/AMC mini-series, Unspeakable.

=== Production, recording and Madic Records ===
Mangan, under the label Madic Records, (an imprint of Arts & Crafts Productions) has released LPs by acts such as Walrus and Astral Swans. Mangan has also recorded and produced works for Astral Swans, including two tracks on 2015's Good People Rock and 2018's Strange Prison.

Mangan and his business partner Laura Simpson appeared in a Season 17 episode of Dragons' Den, pitching for an investment in his online concert platform Side Door. They secured a deal from Arlene Dickinson.

== Touring ==
With various collections of musicians, Mangan has toured extensively throughout Europe, North America and Australia. They've shared stages with Father John Misty, The Walkmen, Japandroids, Jeff Mangum, Mumford & Sons, Edward Sharpe and the Magnetic Zeros, Missy Elliott, Kendrick Lamar, Lucinda Williams, Broken Social Scene, Tune-Yards, Arlo Guthrie, José González, Junip, Stars, Marina And The Diamonds, Phox, Sharon Van Etten, Run The Jewels, Hot Chip, Cake, Metric, The Decemberists, Julian Casablancas, Timber Timbre, Sarah Harmer, The Broken Family Band, Elliott Brood, The Acorn, Alison Krauss, Howe Gelb, Jackson Browne, Bowerbirds, The head and the heart, We Were Promised Jetpacks, Blind Pilot, Patrick Watson, Jenn Grant, Brett Dennen, KD Lang, Mother Mother, Great Lake Swimmers, Basia Bulat, Veda Hille, Hannah Georgas, Charlie Parr, Bear's Den, Hey Rosetta!, The Shins, Sam Roberts Band, Jason Collett, Bahamas, Rich Aucoin, Zeus, Macklemore, Vampire Weekend, City & Colour, Yukon Blonde, Sondre Lerche, Warpaint, Other Lives, Suuns, Spoon, Tegan and Sara, Lucius.

On Canada Day in 2011 Mangan performed for the Duke and Duchess of Cambridge.

Dan Mangan (or Dan Mangan + Blacksmith) have been invited to perform at many international music festivals including:

- UK: Glastonbury (2010 "John Peel Stage", 2011 "Other Stage"), End of the Road Festival (2011), Summer Sundae Fringe Festival (2012)
- Australia: Woodford Folk Festival (2010), East Coast Blues and Roots (2008), and Peats Ridge (2009, 2010)
- Canada: Halifax Pop Explosion (2009, 2011, 2012), Vancouver Folk Music Festival (2009, 2012), Dawson City Music Festival (2010), Calgary Folk Festival (2010, 2012), Mariposa Folk Festival (2010), Winnipeg Folk Festival (2011, 2015), Regina Folk Festival (2011), Home County Folk Festival (2011), Hillside Festival (2011, 2022), Quebec City Summer Festival (2012) Osheaga Festival (2012), Luminato Festival (2012), Ottawa Bluesfest (2011, 2022), Ottawa Folk Festival (2012), Gentlemen of the Road (2013), Squamish Valley Music Festival (2013), Calgary X-Fest (2013), Sonic Boom (2013), Rifflandia Music Festival (2009, 2012), Riverfest Elora (2014), Edmonton Folk Music Festival (2014), CBC Music Festival (2014), Field Trip (2013, 2015), Pemberton Festival (2015), Folk on the Rocks (2015), Northern Lights Festival Boréal (2015), Harbourage (2015)
- USA: Sasquatch! Festival (2011, 2015), Rocky Mt. Folks Festival (2011), Telluride Bluegrass Festival (2012)
- Germany: Reeperbahn Festival (2010, 2015), Orange Blossom Special (2011), Haldern Pop (2011, 2012), Golden Leaves (2015), Rolling Stone Weekender (2018)
- Netherlands: Noorderzon (2012), Incubate Festival (2015)
- Croatia: Terraneo Festival (2012)

Mangan's March 13, 2020 show at the Danforth Music Hall in Toronto, Ontario was cancelled due to the COVID-19 pandemic. In response, Mangan and his band played a half-hour set to the empty hall, which Mangan streamed on YouTube the following Monday as "Show to Nobody".

In December 2021 he announced his first significant national tour since the pandemic shutdown, with Georgia Harmer as the opening act.

== Personal life ==
Mangan's family moved often, residing in both the provinces of Ontario and British Columbia, but primarily in his current residence of Vancouver. He was influenced by his parents' record collection, especially the music of Nick Drake and The Beatles. At sixteen, Mangan started a band called Basement Suite with some classmates and played gigs at local community centres. Though his family had returned to Vancouver by age two, he was born in Smithers, British Columbia.

Mangan studied at the University of British Columbia, earning a BA in English Literature.

He lives in Vancouver with his wife Kirsten Slenning and two children. In 2026, Mangan endorsed Avi Lewis in that year's federal NDP leadership race.

== Discography ==
=== Studio albums ===
Year	Album details
2005	Postcards & Daydreaming: Label: File Under: Music, ABC/Warner; Format: LP, CD, digital download; Re-released in 2007
2009	Nice, Nice, Very Nice: Label: Arts & Crafts, File Under: Music, ABC/Universal; Format: LP, CD, digital download
2011	Oh Fortune: Label: Arts & Crafts, City Slang, ABC/Universal; Format: LP, CD, digital download
2015	Club Meds (credited as Dan Mangan + Blacksmith): Label: Arts & Crafts, City Slang, Create/Control; Format: LP, CD, digital download
2018	More or Less: Label: Arts & Crafts, Caroline; Format: LP, CD, digital download
2020	Thief: Label: Arts & Crafts; Format: LP, CD, digital download
2022	Being Somewhere: Label: Arts & Crafts; Format: LP, CD, digital download
2024	Being Elsewhere Mix: Label: Arts & Crafts; Format: LP, CD, digital download
2025	Natural Light: Label: Arts & Crafts; Format: LP, CD, digital download

=== EPs ===
Year	EP details
2003	All At Once: Label: File Under: Music; Format: CD
2009	Roboteering: Label: File Under: Music; Format: CD, Digital download
2012	Radicals: Label: Arts & Crafts, City Slang, ABC; Format: 7", Digital download
2016	Unmake: Label: Arts & Crafts, City Slang; Format: Digital download

== Appearances ==
Year	Artist	Song	Album
2015	Astral Swans with Dan Mangan	"You Are A Runner & I Am My Father's Son" (Wolf Parade cover)	Good People Rock
2018	Astral Swans	"Controls"	Strange Prison

== See also ==
- Music of Canada
- Canadian rock
- List of Canadian musicians
