= Oh Fortune =

Studio album by Dan Mangan
- Released: September 27, 2011
- Genres: Indie folk, indie rock
- Length: 40:42
- Label: Arts & Crafts

Dan Mangan chronology
Nice, Nice, Very Nice (2009)	Oh Fortune (2011)	Club Meds (2015)

Oh Fortune is the Juno Award-winning third album by Canadian singer-songwriter Dan Mangan, released on September 27, 2011, on the Arts & Crafts label. The album debuted on the Billboard Canadian Albums Chart the week of October 15, 2011, at number nine.

The album is the follow-up to 2009's Nice, Nice, Very Nice, which was short-listed for the Polaris Prize. In contrast to its predecessor's sparse acoustic guitar, Oh Fortune relies more often on fuller orchestral arrangements, described by Now Magazine's Carla Gillis as "expansive, epic orchestral indie rock". It has also been described as having a darker emotional and lyrical tone, comparable to its namesake poem "O Fortuna", without becoming too grim. David Berry of the National Post describes the album's theme as "a kind of bald appraisal of the situation that packs it full of so much more — meaning, weight, beauty, humour — than your typical singer-songwriter’s over-emotive pigeonholing".

At the 2012 Juno Awards, Mangan received the award for Alternative Album of the Year for Oh Fortune.

== Reception ==
Oh Fortune has received mostly positive reviews. Francois Marchand of The Vancouver Sun gave the album four and a half out of five stars, claiming that "sonically, Oh Fortune shines". AllMusic's Andrew Leahy awarded the album three out of five stars, calling it the "most ornate thing [Mangan]'s ever done" and comparing it to The Swell Season. Now Magazine also gave Oh Fortune three out of five stars, saying that Mangan "has leapt ahead not one or two steps, but three or four."

The album was named as a longlisted nominee for the 2012 Polaris Music Prize on June 14, 2012.

== Track listing ==
All songs composed by Dan Mangan.

No.	Title	Length
1.	"About As Helpful as You Can Be Without Being Any Help At All"	3:06
2.	"How Darwinian"	3:33
3.	"Post-War Blues"	3:42
4.	"If I Am Dead"	4:06
5.	"Daffodil"	2:40
6.	"Starts With Them, Ends With Us"	4:24
7.	"Oh Fortune"	3:22
8.	"Leaves, Trees, Forest"	4:12
9.	"Rows of Houses"	4:07
10.	"Regarding Death and Dying"	2:25
11.	"Jeopardy"	5:05
