= Pachyderm Studios =

Recording studio in Cannon Falls, Minnesota, US

Coordinates: 44.5320°N 92.8739°W

Pachyderm Recording Studios
- Founded: 1988; 38 years ago in Cannon Falls, United States
- Founder: Jim Nickel, Mark Walk, Eric S. Anderson
- Website: pachyderm-studios.com

Pachyderm Recording Studios is a residential music recording studio located in Cannon Falls, Minnesota, United States.

== History ==
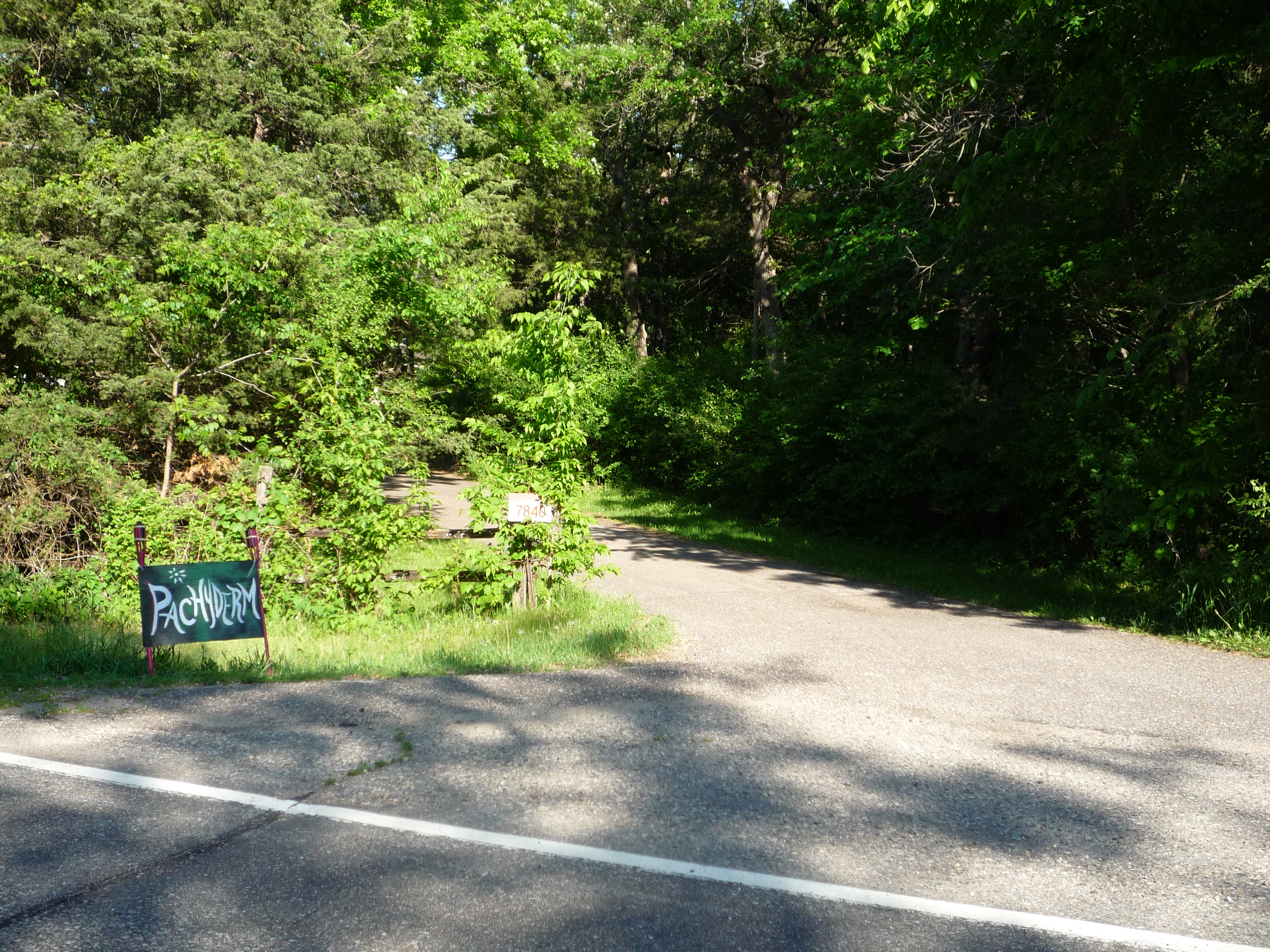
Sign and driveway for the secluded studio.

The studio was founded in 1988 by Jim Nickel, Mark Walk and Eric S. Anderson, with acoustic design by Bret Theney of Westlake Audio. Located 35.8 mi (57.6 km) southeast of the Minneapolis–Saint Paul metropolitan area, it is located in a secluded old-growth forest in rural Minnesota. The studio featured the same Neve 8068 recording console that was used in Jimi Hendrix's Electric Lady Studios as well as Studer tape machines. The house was designed by Herb Bloomberg, architect of Old Log Theatre and founder of the Chanhassen Dinner Theatres.

The studio went into a decline in the mid-2000s, after original co-owner Jim Nickel sold the property. It went into a state of disrepair for many years, though bands occasionally still recorded there. It was purchased by engineer John Kuker in 2011 out of foreclosure and remodeled over the next three years. Kuker died on February 2, 2015, at the age of 40, after which his family took over ownership.

The home, studio and grounds were renovated. The studio is managed by longtime Kuker employee Nick Tveitbakk and clients are still able to record with the wide variety of musical equipment and guitars that Kuker collected.

== Selected recordings made at Pachyderm ==
- Seamonsters – The Wedding Present (1991)
- Lulu – Trip Shakespeare (1991)
- Fontanelle – Babes In Toyland (1992)
- Comfort – Failure (1992)
- Hollywood Town Hall – The Jayhawks (1992)
- Grave Dancers Union – Soul Asylum (1992)
- In Utero – Nirvana (1993)
- Sound as Ever – You Am I (1993)
- Rid of Me – PJ Harvey (1993)
- Throwing Copper – Live (1994)
- You'd Prefer an Astronaut – Hum (1995)
- Arise Therefore – Palace (1996)
- Walk on Water - Rainmaker (1996) (bass/songwriter: Johnee D'Shea)
- Rapture – Bradley Joseph (1997)
- Good News for Modern Man – Grant Hart (1999)
- Acre Thrills – U.S. Maple (2001)
- Everynight Fire Works - Hey Mercedes (2001)
- From Here to Infirmary – Alkaline Trio (2001)
- Stuart Davis – Stuart Davis (2001)
- The End of All Things to Come – Mudvayne (2002)
- No Worries – Stealin’ Strings (2004)
- Armchair Apocrypha – Andrew Bird (2007)
- Prog – The Bad Plus (2007)
- The Lost Tapes – Stealin’ Strings (2008)
- Wild Animals – Trampled by Turtles (2014)
- Panic Stations – Motion City Soundtrack (2015)
- The Cooling – Reina del Cid (2015)
- Polar Similar – Norma Jean (2016)
- Furnace – Dead Man Winter (2017)
- Still Thirsty – Four Pints Shy (2018)
- Life Is Good on the Open Road – Trampled by Turtles (2018)
- Sigourney Fever – Trampled by Turtles (2019)
- Red Tail – Dave Simonett (2020)
- Once Twice Melody – Beach House (2022)
- Caves – NEEDTOBREATHE (2023)
- Midas – Wunderhorse (2024)
- Chiello – Agonia (2025)
