= Stuart Davis =

Stuart Davis or Stewart or Davies may refer to:

- Stuart Davis (golfer) (born 1973), English golfer
- Stuart Davis (musician) (born 1971), American musician and songwriter
  - Stuart Davis (album)
- Stuart Davis (painter) (1892–1964), American modernist painter
- Stuart Davis (rugby league) (born 1961), Australian rugby league player
- Stuart Davies (rugby union) (born 1965), Welsh rugby union footballer
- Stuart Davies (engineer) (1906–1995), designer of the Avro Vulcan
- Stewart Davies, former chairman of Darlington F.C.
- Stewart Davies (bowls) (born 1955), Australian lawn and indoor bowler
