= LP3 =

LP3 or lp3 may stand for:

- Lista Przebojów Programu Trzeciego, the longest-running Polish hit songs chart
- American Football (2019 album), the third album by the band American Football
- LP3 (Ratatat album), an album by Ratatat
- LP3 (Lady Pank album), an album by Lady Pank
- Lost Planet 3, a video game
- LP3 (Hippo Campus album), an album by Hippo Campus
