= Stuart Davies =

Stuart Davies may refer to:

- Stuart Davies (rugby union)
- Stuart Davies (engineer)

== See also ==
- Stuart Davis (disambiguation)
