= Volt (EP) =

1992 EP by Trip Shakespeare

EP by Trip Shakespeare
- Released: 1992
- Genre: Alternative rock
- Length: 22:25
- Label: Clean/Twin/Tone

Trip Shakespeare chronology
Lulu (1991)	Volt (1992)

Professional ratings
Review scores
Source	Rating
Allmusic	3/5 stars

Volt is the final work released by Minneapolis alternative rock band Trip Shakespeare. A six-song EP of covers, it was released in 1992 by Minneapolis label Clean Records.

Volt includes songs by Nick Lowe, Thunderclap Newman, Big Star, the Zombies, Hüsker Dü, and Neil Young.

== History ==
The recording of the songs on Volt, which were intended to be Trip Shakespeare's fifth album, followed two albums for major label A&M Records, Across the Universe and Lulu. Both were critically well-reviewed but suffered from low sales. Inspired by the then-current 1992 Los Angeles riots, the band chose songs about peace, revolution and freedom as a unifying concept for the album. A&M initially encouraged the project, but became unsure how to market it. A&M's promotions department, upon hearing the album, responded by saying "What do we do with this?", according to bassist John Munson.

The label eventually rejected Volt and dropped Trip Shakespeare from its roster. The band broke up soon afterwards.

Trip Shakespeare bought back the Volt songs from the label and released it on Clean, the Minneapolis independent label which had put out its first records.

== Reception ==
The album had a mixed reception from critics. Gregory McIntosh of AllMusic wrote that none of the songs were "particularly gripping, but there are some great moments as well as fun listens for fans of Trip Shakespeare." Chris Morris of Billboard praised the "stunning, harmony-laden" and "sharp selection of covers." Courtney King of Tennessee newspaper The Jackson Sun called Volt "enjoyable," singling out the "upbeat and peppy" version of "Peace Love, and Understanding," calling it "a really good song to slam to if you do it at a moderate pace," but felt that the band did better with its original compositions. Dave Strahan of the Daily Iowan newspaper called it "a disappointment", saying it reduced Trip Shakespeare to "a cheesy cover band." He praised the song "Helpless" as "the gem buried in this uninspired work, [which] maintains the beauty of the song while making it their own."

== Track listing ==
No.	Title	Composer	Length
1.	"(What's So Funny 'Bout) Peace, Love and Understanding?"	Nick Lowe	3:36
2.	"Something in the Air"	John "Speedy" Keen	3:26
3.	"The Ballad of El Goodo"	Chris Bell and Alex Chilton	4:27
4.	"Time of the Season"	Rod Argent	3:41
5.	"Dead Set on Destruction"	Grant Hart	2:36
6.	"Helpless"	Neil Young	4:36
