= Duluth (album) =

Studio album by Trampled by Turtles
- Released: October 30, 2008
- Genre: Indie folk
- Length: 40:19

Trampled by Turtles chronology
Trouble (2007)	Duluth (2008)	Palomino (2010)

Duluth is the fourth studio release by Duluth, Minnesota, group Trampled by Turtles. All songs written by Dave Simonett, except for where noted. This was the first album from the band to chart. It reached number 8 on the US Bluegrass Chart. The album was released on October 30, 2008.

== Track listing ==
Duluth track listing
No.	Title	Length
1.	"November"	3:38
2.	"White Noise"	2:07
3.	"The Darkness and the Light"	3:22
4.	"Truck" (Dave Carroll)	2:49
5.	"Empire"	3:21
6.	"Methodism in Middle America"	6:25
7.	"Nobody Else"	2:26
8.	"Pipe Knot" (Erik Berry)	2:59
9.	"Think It Over"	3:11
10.	"Duluth"	3:01
11.	"Shenandoah" (Trad.)	4:18
12.	"Hammock Swinging" (Erik Berry)	2:45
Total length:		40:22

== Personnel ==
- Dave Simonett – guitar, lead vocals, harmonica
- Tim Saxhaug – bass, backing vocals
- Dave Carroll – banjo, backing vocals
- Erik Berry – mandolin
- Ryan Young – fiddle, backing vocals
