= Live at First Avenue =

Live album by Trampled by Turtles
- Released: November 12, 2013
- Recorded: April 17–19, 2013 at First Avenue
- Genre: Indie folk Alternative country Bluegrass
- Label: BanjoDad Records

Trampled by Turtles chronology
Stars and Satellites (2012)	Live at First Avenue (2013)	Wild Animals (2014)

Live at First Avenue is a live album by Minnesota-based bluegrass group Trampled by Turtles, released on November 12, 2014. It was recorded at the Minneapolis nightclub First Avenue in April 2013 to celebrate the band's 10th anniversary.

== Track listing ==
No.	Title	Length
1.	"Midnight on the Interstate"	4:13
2.	"Burn for Free"	3:20
3.	"Stranger"	3:48
4.	"Codeine"	2:49
5.	"Where Is My Mind?"	3:31
6.	"Gasoline"	5:18
7.	"Wait So Long"	3:33
8.	"New Orleans"	4:46
9.	"Drinkin' in the Morning"	3:49
10.	"Bloodshot Eyes"	6:31
11.	"Again"	3:48
