= Wild Animals (Trampled by Turtles album) =

Studio album by Trampled by Turtles
- Released: July 15th, 2014
- Recorded: 2014
- Studio: Pachyderm, Cannon Falls, Minnesota
- Genre: Indie folk Alternative country Bluegrass
- Length: 41:01
- Label: BanjoDad
- Producer: Alan Sparhawk

Trampled by Turtles chronology
Live at First Avenue (2013)	Wild Animals (2014)	Life Is Good on the Open Road (2018)

Wild Animals is the seventh studio album by Minnesota-based bluegrass group Trampled by Turtles, released on July 15, 2014. The cover art was inspired by metal sculptor Tomohiro Inaba's work.

== Track listing ==
No.	Title	Length
1.	"Wild Animals"	5:49
2.	"Hollow"	3:53
3.	"Repetition"	3:04
4.	"Are You Behind the Shining Star?"	3:01
5.	"Silver Light"	4:21
6.	"Come Back Home"	2:40
7.	"Ghosts"	3:43
8.	"Lucy"	3:42
9.	"Western World"	2:38
10.	"Nobody Knows"	2:57
11.	"Winners"	5:13
