= Stars and Satellites =

Stars & Satellites

Studio album by Trampled by Turtles
- Released: April 10, 2012
- Recorded: Fall 2011
- Studio: Log cabin in Duluth
- Genre: Indie folk
- Label: BanjoDad

Trampled by Turtles chronology
Palomino (2010)	Stars & Satellites (2012)	Live at First Avenue (2013)

Stars and Satellites is the sixth studio album by Minnesota-based bluegrass group Trampled by Turtles, released April 10, 2012, on their label Banjodad Records.

== Recording ==
According to Dave Simonett, the creation of their sixth studio album started in the fall of 2011. Their studio was a log home outside Duluth, where they moved furniture aside, set up microphones and started to develop the album.

== Promotion ==
Trampled by Turtles made their network television debut at the end of April 2012 on the Late Show with David Letterman, where they performed "Alone", one of the slow-tempo songs from the Stars and Satellites album. They also played the song "Walt Whitman", which has a frantic and upbeat melody, tempered with Simonett's almost melancholic lyrics, on The Late Late Show with Craig Ferguson.

== Reception ==
The album has been on Billboard's bluegrass charts since April 18, 2012. It was also No. 14 on the Billboard Folk Album Chart, and peaked at No. 32 on the Billboard Top 200 Chart.

According to Keith Goetzman, Trampled by Turtles have built a reputation and a fan base by playing punk-tempo bluegrass. Reed Fischer states, the song "Wait So Long," a track from 2010's chart-topping Palomino, proved to be the song to make a rowdy audience. However, on Stars and Satellites, the band slowed their pace and took a more contemplative approach to making music. Lead singer Dave Simonett said, "From the start we knew that we didn’t want to go back to trying to recreate a live show with our new endeavor. We wanted to make a record that breathes. We wanted it to feel and sound warm and more like one piece of work than several pieces put together."

Amazon.com stated that the band had sold out 95% of the shows they played in 2011, as well as playing the main stage at divergent festivals such as Coachella and Telluride, and that the buzz around their latest album had much to do with this. Melding rock, punk, and indie influences, Trampled by Turtles is creating a unique sound from a traditional music form. South by Southwest wrote, "Trampled by Turtles employs many of the same traditional techniques of the genre, but their differences in influences, attitude and attack make for their unique sound."

== Track listing ==
All tracks are written by Dave Simonett, except where noted.

No.	Title	Writer(s)	Length
1.	"Midnight on the Interstate"		3:25
2.	"Alone"		4:28
3.	"Walt Whitman"		2:38
4.	"High Water"		5:43
5.	"Risk"	Dave Carroll	2:49
6.	"Widower's Heart"		5:33
7.	"Sorry"	Simonett, Erik Koskinen	2:47
8.	"Beautiful"		4:29
9.	"Don't Look Down"	Erik Berry	3:19
10.	"Keys to Paradise"		4:02
11.	"The Calm and The Crying Wind"		3:58
Total length:			43:17

== Personnel ==
Trampled By Turtles

- Dave Simmonett - lead vocals, guitar
- Tim Saxhaug - bass, backing vocals
- Dave Carroll - banjo, backing vocals
- Erik Berry - mandolin
- Ryan Young - fiddle, viola, backing vocals, mandolin, viola da gamba, saw

Guests

- Eamonn McLain - cello on "Alone"
- Erik Koskinen - lap steel on "Widower's Heart"
- Tom Herbers - percussion
- Alone Choir: Sarah Krueger, Hattie Peterson, Michelle Seery
- Crying Wind Choir: Blake Shippee, Dan Huiting, Ryan Thompson, Sarah Krueger, Hattie Peterson, Michelle Seery
