= Alex Gibson (music producer) =

Bruce Alexander Gibson IV (born April 10, 1974) is an American record producer, engineer, mixer, composer, and brand developer. He has been a part of production teams that in total, have sold over 25 million albums worldwide and has worked with Van Halen, David Lee Roth, Rod Stewart, Ringo Starr, Jane’s Addiction, Rockabye Baby!, Apple, Paramount, VH1, HBO, and Showtime.

== Biography ==
Gibson was born in Orlando, Florida. He attended the University of Florida and studied Chemistry and Music. He played drums with several bands in the Gainesville music scene including the Brazilian band Jacaré Brazil. During the summer of 1995, Gibson toured and played with both Jacaré Brazil and the famed Brazilian group Olodum.

After graduating with a degree in chemistry in 1996, he moved to Boston, Massachusetts, to study Music Production and Engineering at the Berklee College of Music.

In 1998, Gibson moved to Los Angeles, California and worked as a Staff Engineer at A&M Studios. He stayed with the studio through its transition to Henson Recording Studios in 2000, eventually becoming Chief Engineer. During his time at Henson/A&M he worked as a 2nd Engineer on recordings with Against the Machine, LeAnn Rimes, Incubus, Michael Bublé, Christina Aguilera, Stone Temple Pilots, and Mick Jagger. (Source: AllMusic) Gibson also worked with a number of prolific producers including Brendan O’Brien, Bob Rock, Rupert Hine, John Shanks, and Joe Barresi.

In 2005, Gibson left the Jim Henson Company and started the production company ActionGoNow with Nathan Jenkins. ActionGoNow offered artist development, production, branding, management; music and sound design for commercials, TV, and web campaigns; and studio and equipment rental. Their client list included Nike (The LeBrons web series), CBS, Volvo, Universal Music Group, and Warner Bros. Gibson left ActionGoNow in 2008.

Later in 2008, Gibson founded and created MettaSonics, a six-hour ambient relaxation program for spas, yoga studios, and massage therapists. The collection of music features elements of binaural beats and Schumann resonances.

In 2009, he engineered and mixed songs by Sting, Damien Rice, and Vanessa Carlton for the album Songs for Tibet: The Art of Peace. Songs for Tibet was the No. 1 Rock Album on iTunes in the United States, France, Canada, Italy, and the Netherlands.

From 2010 to 2012, Gibson reunited with David Lee Roth on a new collection of songs and a web series called The Roth Show. He also produced a new studio album with Stuart Davis called Music for Mortals, and the album Fall Like You're Flying with the rock band Echo Echo. In 2013, Gibson produced two songs with Stuart Davis for the upcoming motion picture Walk of Shame.

Gibson is married to television producer Meagen Gibson and they have two sons.

== Discography ==
- 1999: Ringo Starr – I Wanna Be Santa Claus (Engineer)
- 2000: Epileptic Disco – Before, During, and After (Producer)
- 2002: Rod Stewart – It Had to be You: The Great American Songbook (Engineer)
- 2002: Seether – Disclaimer II (String Engineer)
- 2003: Jane’s Addiction – Stray’s (Engineer)
- 2003: Hank Madison – Be the Sky (Producer, Mixer, Engineer)
- 2003: Stuart Davis – Bell (Producer, Mixer, Engineer, Composer, Musician)
- 2003: David Lee Roth – Diamond Dave (Producer, Mixer, Engineer, Musician)
- 2004: American Eyes – American Eyes (Producer, Mixer, Engineer)
- 2005: Rod Stewart – The Great American Songbook (Engineer, Digital Editing)
- 2005: Screaming Witness – Screaming Witness (Producer, Mixer, Engineer)
- 2005: Underwater City People – You of All People (Mixer, Engineer)
- 2005: The Wallflowers – iTunes Originals (Mixer, Engineer)
- 2005: Ben Folds – iTunes Originals (Mixer, Engineer)
- 2006: Stuart Davis – ¿What (Producer, Mixer, Engineer, Composer, Musician)
- 2006: David Lee Roth – Strummin’ with the Devil (2006)
- 2006: Jon Peter Lewis – Stories from Hollywood (Producer, Mixer, Engineer)
- 2006: Paul Stanley – Live To Win (Engineer)
- 2006: Christina Aguilera – Stripped (Assistant Engineer)
- 2007: Tamarind – Sounds Alone (Producer, Mixer, Engineer, Composer, Musician)
- 2007: Rockabye Baby! – Lullaby Renditions of Nine Inch Nails (Producer, Artist)
- 2007: TD Lind – Let’s Get Lost (Mixer, Engineer)
- 2008: Kute Blackson – Love.Now (Producer, Mixer, Engineer, Composer, Musician)
- 2008: 2008: The Bravery – Sun and the Moon (Engineer)
- 2008: Stuart Davis – Something Simple (Producer, Mixer, Engineer, Composer, Musician)
- 2008: Ginormous – At Night, Under Artificial Light (Mixer, Engineer)
- 2008: Sting – Songs for Tibet (Mixer, Engineer)
- 2008: Damien Rice – Songs for Tibet (Mixer, Engineer)
- 2008: Vanessa Carlton – Songs for Tibet (Mixer, Engineer)
- 2008: Rockabye Baby! – Lullaby Renditions of AC/DC (Producer, Artist)
- 2008: Jessica Simpson – Do You Know (Engineer)
- 2009: Michelle Featherstone – Blue Bike (Engineer)
- 2009: Bon Jovi – Circle (Engineer)
- 2009: Stuart Davis – Sex, God, Rock ‘n Roll (Songs from the TV Show) (Producer, Composer)
- 2009: Ginormous – The Sound of Love Impermanent (Mixer, Engineer)
- 2010: Echo Echo – Fall Like You're Flying (Producer, Mixer, Engineer)
- 2012: Van Halen – The Downtown Sessions (Engineer)
- 2012: Stuart Davis – Music For Mortals (Producer, Mixer, Engineer, Composer, Musician)
