= LP3 (Hippo Campus album) =

Studio album by Hippo Campus
- Released: February 4, 2022
- Genre: Indie pop; soft rock; indie rock
- Length: 33:46
- Label: Grand Jury
- Producer: Caleb Hinz

Hippo Campus chronology
Good Dog, Bad Dream (2021)	LP3 (2022)	Wasteland (2023)

Singles from LP3
- 1. "Boys" Released: October 18, 2021; 2. "Semi Pro" Released: November 30, 2021; 3. "Ride or Die" Released: January 11, 2022; 4. "Bang Bang" Released: February 1, 2022

LP3 ratings
Review scores
Source	Rating
AllMusic	4.5/5 stars
Clash	7/10
Dork	4/5 stars
Gigwise	9/10 stars
The Line of Best Fit	9/10

LP3 is the third studio album by American rock band Hippo Campus. It was released on February 4, 2022, through Grand Jury Music.

== Background ==
LP3 was first announced on October 18, 2021, alongside the release of its lead single "Boys". The album explores themes such as sexuality, long-distance relationships, mortality, and self-identity. In an interview with Finlay Holden from The Line of Best Fit, band members Jake Luppen and Nathan Stocker noted that the album was something of a "return to form," as interpersonal and creative clashes lead to their previous studio album, Bambi, departing from their vision of the core of the band. Holden himself commented that the individual experimentation and creative release of Bambi was crucial for the band's development, from which "a newfound perspective blossomed."

== Track listing ==
All tracks are written by Jake Luppen, Nathan Stocker, Whistler Allen, and Zach Sutton.

LP3 track listing
No.	Title	Length
1.	"2 Young 2 Die"	3:40
2.	"Blew Its"	2:57
3.	"Ashtray"	2:34
4.	"Bang Bang"	2:54
5.	"Semi Pro"	3:02
6.	"Ride or Die"	3:30
7.	"Scorpio"	3:15
8.	"Listerine"	3:12
9.	"Boys"	4:13
10.	"Understand"	4:28
Total length:		33:46

== Personnel ==
Hippo Campus

- Jake Luppen – lead vocals, guitar, co-production, engineering
- Nathan Stocker – lead guitar, vocals, engineering
- Whistler Allen – drums, vocals, engineering
- Zach Sutton – bass guitar, keyboards, engineering
- DeCarlo Jackson – trumpet, engineering

Additional contributors

- Caleb Hinz – production, mixing, engineering
- Huntley Miller – mastering
- Raffaella Melon – additional vocals
- David Kramer – artwork
- Eliot Larson – artwork
