= Applehead Man =

1986 debut album by Trip Shakespeare

Studio album by Trip Shakespeare
- Released: 1986
- Genre: Alternative rock
- Label: Gark (original release), Clean/Twin/Tone (1998 re-release), Omnivore (2014 re-release)

Trip Shakespeare chronology
Applehead Man (1986)	Are You Shakespearienced? (1989)

Professional ratings
Review scores
Source	Rating
AllMusic	3.5/5 stars
Blurt	4/5 stars

Applehead Man is the debut studio album released by Minneapolis alternative rock band Trip Shakespeare. It was released in 1986 on Minneapolis label Gark Records, then reissued in 1998 on Minneapolis label Clean/Twin/Tone Records, and again in 2014 on Omnivore Recordings.

It was the only Trip Shakespeare album not to feature Dan Wilson, brother of founding member and main songwriter Matt Wilson, who joined after its recording. In an interview with the Chicago Reader's Bill Wyman, Matt Wilson suggested that Dan was convinced to join by the quality and potential suggested by Applehead Man: "We sent him the first record almost as a demo tape, to get him to join up, and kept telling him how serious we were."

== Reception ==
The album was received favorably by critics, who tended to view it in hindsight as a flawed example of Trip Shakespeare's potential, and generally considered a forerunner to their second album, Are You Shakespearienced? Timothy Monger of AllMusic noted that the album's cheerful psychedelia was out of step with the times in 1986, saying that the band's "ebullient art rock was extremely literate and melodic with complex harmonies, freewheeling guitar solos, and a heady Northern romanticism that was at odds with the grim post-hardcore of Hüsker Dü or the shambling, earthy roots rock of the Replacements." Michael Toland of Blurt said that the album "debuts a fresh, exciting young trio playing power pop with distinctive personality (and) a seemingly bottomless bag of appealing songs." The Chicago Reader's Bill Wyman disliked Applehead Man, calling it "an almost unlistenable excursion into overearnest art rock." (He was more positive towards Are You Shakespearienced?.) Scott Schinder of Trouser Press called Applehead Man "a spunky debut, with stylishly visceral lyrics and inventive melodies," though he said that the band did not "yet possess the expertise to do full justice to Matt Wilson’s surprisingly sophisticated compositions."

== Songs ==
1. "Fangs"
2. "Rose"
3. "Stop the Winter"
4. "Necklace"
5. "Applehead Man"
6. "Washington Bridge"
7. "Pearle"
8. "Fireball"
9. "Highway in the Sun"
10. "Beatle"
