= Palomino (Trampled by Turtles album) =

Studio album by Trampled by Turtles
- Released: April 13, 2010
- Genre: Indie folk
- Length: 43:33

Trampled by Turtles chronology
Duluth (2008)	Palomino (2010)	Stars and Satellites (2012)

Palomino is the fifth album by the Duluth, Minnesota-based band Trampled by Turtles. It was released on April 13, 2010, through their record label, Banjodad Records. The album reached number one on the US Billboard bluegrass chart, and maintained a top ten position on the chart for 52 consecutive weeks. Music videos were produced for the songs "Wait So Long" and "Victory".

== Track listing ==
All tracks are written by Dave Simonett, except where noted.

No.	Title	Writer(s)	Length
1.	"Wait So Long"		3:26
2.	"Victory"		3:57
3.	"It's a War"		2:30
4.	"Separate"		3:33
5.	"Bloodshot Eyes"		5:00
6.	"New Son/Burnt Iron"	Erik Berry	4:23
7.	"Help You"		3:13
8.	"Feet and Bones"		1:55
9.	"Gasoline"		3:00
10.	"Sounds Like a Movie"	Dave Carroll	2:26
11.	"New Orleans"		3:31
12.	"Again"		3:15
Total length:			40:15

== Personnel ==
Trampled by Turtles

- Dave Simonett: vocals, guitar
- Tim Saxhaug: bass, vocals
- Dave Carroll: banjo, vocals
- Erik Berry: mandolin
- Ryan Young: fiddle

== Charts ==
Chart performance for Palomino
Chart (2010)	Peak position
US Heatseekers Albums (Billboard)	11
US Independent Albums (Billboard)	46
US Top Bluegrass Albums (Billboard)	1
