= Something Simple =

Studio album by Stuart Davis
- Released: 2008
- Length: 42:45
- Label: Majeski Media
- Producer: Alex Gibson

Stuart Davis chronology
What? (2006)	Something Simple (2008)

Something Simple is Stuart Davis' fourteenth studio album which was released in 2008.

== Track listing ==
1. "Already Free"
2. "The River"
3. "Deity Freak"
4. "Wand"
5. "Twisted Mystery"
6. "Fear of Light"
7. "Nothing In Between"
8. "Sugar Bullets"
9. "Sky God"
10. "Universe Communion"
11. "Miracle"
12. "White Plum"
