= Howler (band) =

Indie-rock band from Minneapolis

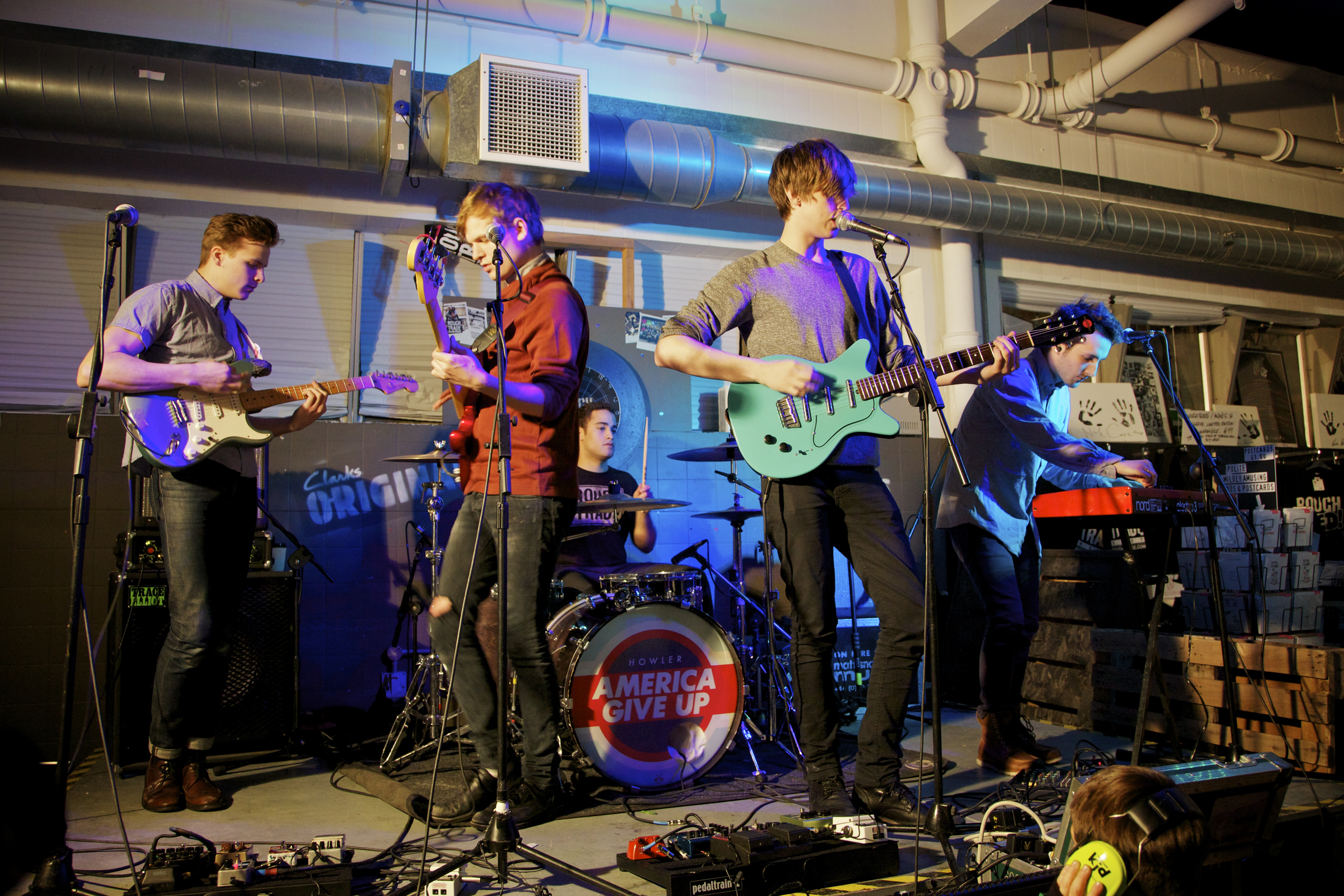
- Howler performing at Rough Trade East, London in 2012

Background information
- Origin: Minneapolis, Minnesota, United States
- Genres: Indie rock, surf rock, garage rock
- Years active: 2010–2017
- Label: Rough Trade
- Past members: Jordan Gatesmith; Ian Nygaard; Yayo Trujillo; Hiram Sevilla; Daniel Hupp; France Camp (Jay Simonson); Brent Mayes; Louis Umbarger; Max Petrek; Rory MacMurdo
- Website: www.yeehawboys.com www.americagiveup.com

Howler was an indie rock band from Minneapolis, Minnesota. The group consisted of Jordan Gatesmith on lead guitar and vocals, Ian Nygaard on guitar, Yayo Trujillo on bass and Hiram Sevilla on drums.

Howler received international acclaim, most notably from NME, which named Howler their No. 3 Best New Band of 2011 and included Jordan Gatesmith in their 2011 Cool List. The band has also played festivals like SXSW, The Great Escape, Reading & Leeds and Rock the Garden.

== History ==
=== Formation and This One's Different EP ===
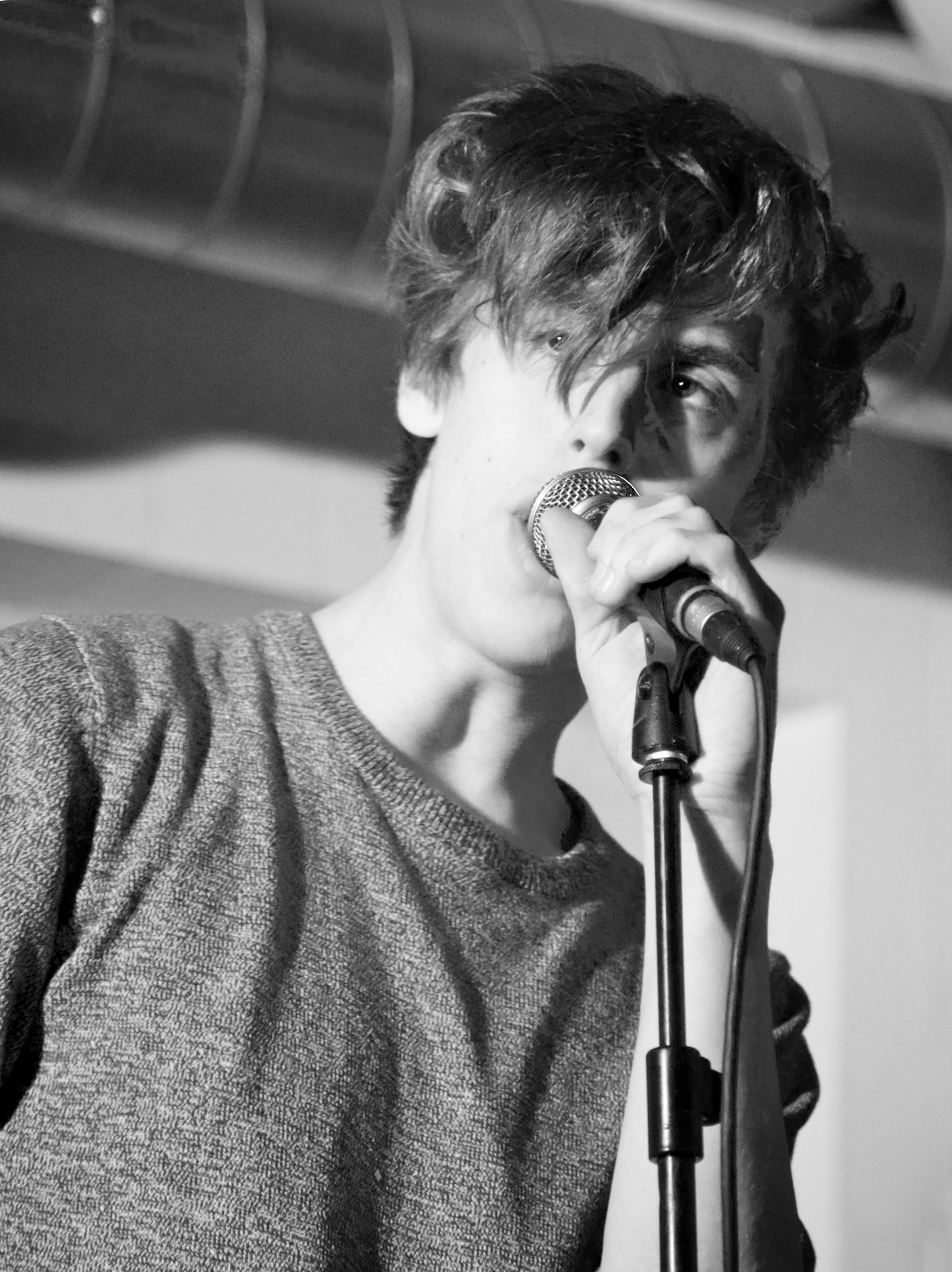
Jordan Gatesmith

Nineteen-year-old Jordan Gatesmith began Howler out of boredom in 2010 with former member Daniel Hupp. Before Howler, he had created other bands without much success. "I was starting bands what seemed like every other week," explained Gatesmith. "We had a metal band for a while. We had one called Gay Animals, another called A-Cups, but none of them really lasted that long". Gatesmith met ex-keyboardist and bassist Max Petrek while on sky-diving course during a visit to Saint Paul. Each noticed the other tapping their feet to a Yardbirds song playing in the reception. Having similar tastes in music, Gatesmith and Petrek started playing together. Ian Nygaard and Jay Simonson (France Camp) were both members of Nice Purse when Gatesmith included them in the band. Both Howler and Nice Purse were on the same record label, SO-TM. Ex-drummer Brent Mayes knew Gatesmith from high school, although Mayes is four years older than Gatesmith, and was thus the oldest member of the band.

Howler's first public performance was at the farmers market where they found financial success. In an interview with Minnesota Public Radio, Gatesmith explained, "People thought the lyrics were really funny and they thought that we were being cute and kind of snide all at the same time. They're like, 'Well that's interesting.' "

Howler released its first EP This One's Different in the United States on February 14, 2011. The band opened for Tapes 'n Tapes on their North American tour. In April 2011 freelance writer Jon Garret watched Howler perform at their release show. While he believed the band was not musically mature yet, Garret thought Howler had potential. He especially saw something special in Gatesmith: "And I guess what really drew me to them was Jordan just really had this phenomenal stage presence that I don't see very often, especially in younger bands."

Garret sent Howler's EP to London-based record label Rough Trade Records without the band's knowledge. The label was impressed with the band and signed Howler to a record deal in summer 2011. The band then supported The Vaccines on their U.K tour, as well as shows in Japan. This One's Different was released in the United Kingdom on August 2, 2011, and received favorable reviews—NME in particular. Emily Mackay writes that while Howler is not different from other bands, it does "make commonplace components fly with a brilliant nonchalance". NME named Howler their No. 3 Best New Band of 2011. In addition, Gatesmith No. 44 on NME's list of the 50 Coolest People of 2011.

=== America Give Up ===
Howler's debut album America Give Up was released in January 2012. The band released the first track from their album "Back of Your Neck" for digital download off their website. Howler later released a music video for the song. Howler spent most of 2012 in the UK promoting America Give Up, as well as stopping off in Australia, Japan and various European countries. During this time, the band played with acts such as Alabama Shakes and Oberhofer. The band was #10 on the 20 best new bands of 2012 by Paste Magazine. The band played a hometown show at Rock the Garden on June 16, 2012.

Howler played NME's first "Generation Next Tour" throughout October 2012. They played throughout the UK, ending at Brighton's "The Haunt" on October 31. Support came from The Cast of Cheers, Gross Magic and Splashh.

=== World Of Joy ===
In an interview with Paste Magazine, Gatesmith announced Howler's plans for a second album, which is inspired by 1960s pop: “I’d say it’s more like the Yardbirds, even a bit psychedelic," said Gatesmith. "I’m really into The Rolling Stones’ more psychedelic records like Between the Buttons, Aftermath, Their Satanic Majesties Request. And also a lot of early ‘60s crooners kind of like Dion [DiMucci] and Del Shannon just for pop sensibilities." Gatesmith stated that he "hoped to release the second album by March 2013".

Featured in "The Fly Magazine" in June 2013, information on album number 2, old working title "Wasteland Blues" was given. The album is an homage to Bob Dylan, and current tracks written for the album are "Fake Flowers" and "Indictment", very much a continuation of Gatesmith's obsession with "60s garage rock and psychedelic, but also for hardcore punk and a lot of other new wave stuff.".

On January 21, 2014, Howler announced via their Facebook page that their second album, titled World of Joy, would be released on March 25, 2014, via Rough Trade Records. They subsequently released the music video for the first single off of the new album, "Don't Wanna", via their Vevo channel on YouTube. On January 25, the band played The Current's 9th birthday party at First Avenue, playing new songs off World of Joy before its release.

In the week leading up to the release of World of Joy, Howler performed around Minneapolis in promotion of the new album. They played the Electric Fetus on March 19, the Triple Rock Social Club on March 20 (World of Joy release show) and Radio K's "Off The Record" on March 21. They departed for their UK and European tour on March 21. On March 18, Howler released the music video for their second single from "World Of Joy", "Indictment" also via their Vevo channel on YouTube. On March 25, Howler released sophomore LP "World Of Joy" via Rough Trade Records.

=== Beyond World of Joy ===
In summer 2015, Gatesmith relocated to Los Angeles, taking on Yayo Trujillo on bass and Hiram Sevilla on drums. This version of the group played shows around the Los Angeles area and in Mexico. In an interview with KZSC Santa Cruza, Gatesmith confirmed both that Howler are working on either a third record or a series of EPs, and that the band had parted ways with Rough Trade Records. The new material has been recorded in January 2016 with Alex Newport producing. Material was also recorded in June 2015 including Nygaard.

=== Disbandment ===
On January 13, 2017, Gatesmith announced the disbandment of Howler and the formation of his new project, called Wellness. He later explained further that "there were no fights nor arguments" and "the words “breaking up” or “disbanding” were never even mentioned by anyone" in addition about the band's break-up.

On April 17, 2020, Howler released the single "Say It Again," released without a record label via Jordan Gatesmith.

== Discography ==
=== Albums ===
- America Give Up (2012), Rough Trade
- World of Joy (2014), Rough Trade

=== EPs ===
- This One's Different (2011), Rough Trade
