= Bambi (Hippo Campus album) =

Studio album by Hippo Campus
- Released: September 28, 2018
- Studios: The Hideaway; Electrical Audio; Flowers; April Base
- Genres: Indie rock; indie pop; experimental rock
- Length: 33:24
- Labels: Grand Jury; Transgressive
- Producers: BJ Burton; Hippo Campus

Hippo Campus chronology
Warm Glow (2017)	Bambi (2018)	Demos I (2019)

Singles from Bambi
- 1. "Passenger" Released: June 12, 2018; 2. "Bambi" Released: August 22, 2018; 3. "Golden" Released: September 26, 2018

Bambi is the second studio album by American rock band Hippo Campus. It was released on September 28, 2018, through Grand Jury Music and Transgressive Records.

== Background ==
The first single for Bambi, "Passenger", was released on June 12, 2018. Lead singer Jake Luppen shared that the album was written in the winter of 2017, four months in the middle of the tour of their debut album, Landmark. Luppen said that the track is focused on the challenges of growing alongside the person you love. Stylistically, Luppen said he tried to challenge himself by orchestrating more complex chord progressions. "I started off with a TR-8 groove and the rest followed pretty naturally.” Natalie Harmsen, writing for Atwood describe Luppen's voice as "airy" and "spacey", yet "clear as a bell".

On August 22, the title track, "Bambi", was released as the second single ahead of the album. The track also was accompanied with a music video the same day. According to Luppen, "Bambi" was the last song added to the record, and described the track as "elusive". The song focuses on challenges of being a friend to those around you when your mental health is getting in the way. A week prior to the release of the album, Hippo Campus performed the song live for the first time in Paste Studios.

== Track listing ==
All tracks are written by Jake Luppen, Nathan Stocker, Whistler Allen, and Zach Sutton.

Bambi track listing
No.	Title	Length
1.	"Mistakes"	3:10
2.	"Anxious"	2:37
3.	"Doubt"	3:13
4.	"Bambi"	3:14
5.	"Why Even Try"	3:38
6.	"Think It Over"	3:03
7.	"Bubbles"	2:50
8.	"Honestly"	2:38
9.	"Golden"	3:28
10.	"Passenger"	5:33
Total length:		33:24

== Personnel ==
Hippo Campus

- Jake Luppen – lead vocals, guitar, production, engineering
- Nathan Stocker – lead guitar, vocals, production, engineering
- Whistler Allen – drums, vocals, production, engineering
- Zach Sutton – bass guitar, keyboards, production, engineering
- DeCarlo Jackson – flugelhorn, production, engineering

Additional contributors

- BJ Burton – production, mixing, engineering
- Huntley Miller – mastering
- Brady Moen – engineering
- Marcus Davies – engineering
- Taylor Hayes – engineering
- Benjamin Lester – pedal steel guitar
- Lee Tran – saxophone
- Lazerbeak – additional programming
- Cory Wong – additional guitar
- David Kramer – art direction

== Critical reception ==
Professional ratings
Review scores
Source	Rating
The Line of Best Fit	7/10 stars
Indie Is Not A Genre	4/5 stars
DIY (magazine)	3/5 stars

Oliver Kuscher, writing for The Line of Best Fit described the album as serious but important. Kuscher praised the synths in the album as well as the lyricism. Kuscher said in conclusion that "this is music about the important things: finding steady footing in a shaky world, being confused and unsure and not understanding everything, and knowing that that’s alright. It’s about 'searching for a better something'".
