= Life Is Good on the Open Road =

Studio album by Trampled by Turtles
- Released: May 4, 2018
- Recorded: December 2017
- Studio: Pachyderm (Cannon Falls)
- Length: 39:18
- Label: BanjoDad

Trampled by Turtles chronology
Wild Animals (2014)	Life Is Good on the Open Road (2018)	Alpenglow (2022)

Life Is Good on the Open Road is the eighth studio album by Minnesota-based bluegrass group Trampled by Turtles, released on May 4, 2018.

== Critical reception ==
Rolling Stone writer Luke Levenson commented, "Life Is Good on the Open Road balances delicate ballads and loose, upbeat romps, with frontman Dave Simonett's strident voice connecting the dots."

== Track listing ==
All tracks are written by Dave Simonett, except "Good Land" written by Erik Berry.

Life Is Good on the Open Road track listing
No.	Title	Length
1.	"Kelly's Bar"	3:32
2.	"We All Get Lonely"	3:58
3.	"The Middle"	4:28
4.	"Thank You, John Steinbeck"	3:02
5.	"Annihilate"	3:25
6.	"Right Back Where We Started"	2:37
7.	"Life Is Good on the Open Road"	3:23
8.	"Blood in the Water"	1:47
9.	"I Went to Hollywood"	2:32
10.	"I'm Not There Anymore"	3:27
11.	"Good Land"	2:51
12.	"I Learn the Hard Way"	4:10
Total length:		39:18

== Personnel ==
Credits adapted from the album's liner notes.

=== Trampled by Turtles ===
- Erik Berry – mandolin, arrangements
- Dave Carroll – banjo, vocals, arrangements, photos
- Eamonn McLain – cello, vocals, arrangements
- Tim Saxhaug – bass, vocals, arrangements
- Dave Simonett – guitar, vocals, arrangements, instant photos
- Ryan Young – fiddle, arrangements

=== Additional contributors ===
- Nick Tveitbakk – engineering, mixing
- Huntley Miller – mastering
- Michael Byzewski – album artwork, layout

== Charts ==
Chart (2018)	Peak position
US Billboard 200	133
