= Rock the Garden =

Annual summer music festival held at Minneapolis, Minnesota

Coordinates: 44°58′05″N 93°17′19″W

- Genre: Alternative Rock, Indie Rock
- Dates: Mid-June
- Location: Minneapolis
- Years active: 1998, 2000, 2002-2004, 2008-2019
- Founders: Walker Art Center
- Website: Walkerart.org

Rock the Garden was an annual summer music festival organized by the Walker Art Center and Minnesota Public Radio held in Minneapolis, Minnesota, that ran from 1998 - 2022. Launched by the Walker in 1998, the event was cosponsored by 89.3 The Current and Minnesota Public Radio after 2008, becoming more of an indie rock festival. Since its founding, Rock the Garden has highlighted national artists such as Wilco, Sonic Youth, David Byrne, MGMT, De La Soul, My Morning Jacket, Spoon, Bon Iver, and The Decemberists, and featured a diverse range of local bands like Low, Doomtree, Fog, Iffy, Cloud Cult, Howler, and Trampled By Turtles.

== Lineups ==
=== 1998 ===
- Hot Head Swing Band
- The Jayhawks

=== 2000 ===
- Sunship Sextet
- Stereolab
- Sonic Youth

=== 2002 ===
- Iffy
- Marc Ribot and Los Cubanos Postizos
- Medeski Martin & Wood

=== 2003 ===
- Fog
- The Bad Plus
- Wilco

=== 2004 ===
- Barbara Cohen
- Antibalas Afrobeat Orchestra
- David Byrne

=== 2008 ===
Rock the Garden 2008 was held on June 21.

- Bon Iver
- Cloud Cult
- The New Pornographers
- Andrew Bird

=== 2009 ===
Rock the Garden 2009 was held on June 19 and featured a new stage location facing the hill instead of the street.

- Solid Gold
- Yeasayer
- Calexico
- The Decemberists

=== 2010 ===
Rock the Garden 2010 was held on June 19.

- Retribution Gospel Choir
- OK Go
- Sharon Jones & The Dap-Kings
- MGMT

=== 2011 ===
Rock the Garden 2011 was held on June 18.

- Tapes 'n Tapes
- Booker T. Jones
- Neko Case
- My Morning Jacket

=== 2012 ===
Rock the Garden 2012 was held on June 16.

- Howler
- Tune-Yards
- Doomtree
- Trampled by Turtles
- The Hold Steady

=== 2013 ===
Rock the Garden 2013 was held on June 15.

- Dan Deacon
- Low
- Bob Mould
- Silversun Pickups
- Metric

=== 2014 ===
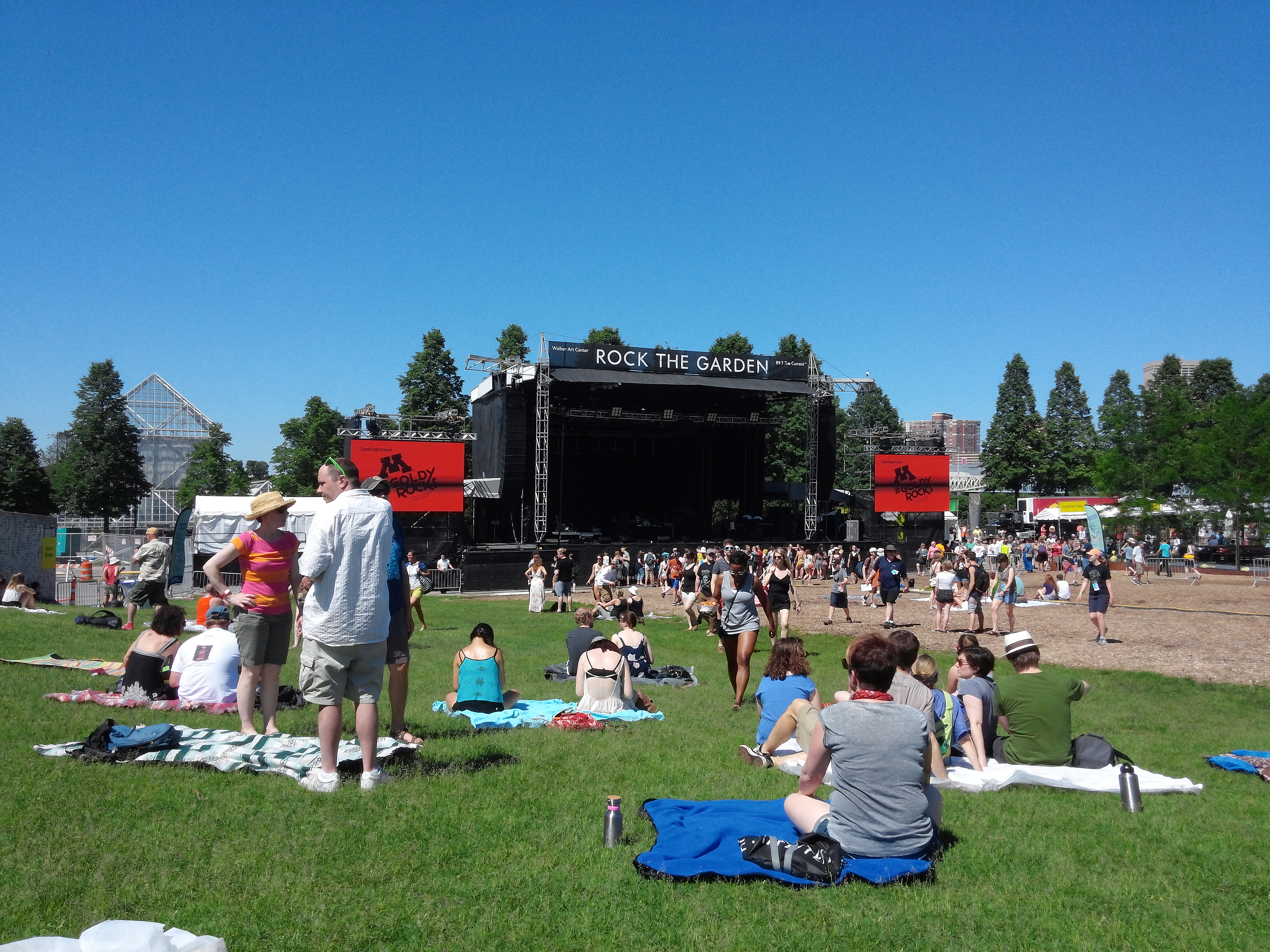
The Rock the Garden stage in 2014

Rock the Garden 2014 was held on June 21 and June 22.

Saturday

- Lizzo
- Jeremy Messersmith
- Best Coast
- Matt & Kim
- De La Soul

Sunday

- Valerie June
- Kurt Vile and The Violators
- Dessa
- Guided By Voices
- Spoon

=== 2015 ===
Rock the Garden 2015 was held on June 20 and June 21.

Saturday

- thestand4rd
- Lucius
- Courtney Barnett
- Conor Oberst
- Belle and Sebastian

Sunday

- The Ghost of a Saber Tooth Tiger
- JD McPherson
- Seun Kuti and Egypt 80
- Babes in Toyland
- Modest Mouse

=== 2016 ===
Rock the Garden 2016 was held June 18 at Boom Island Park (due to construction on the Walker Art Center campus).

- Plague Vendor
- GRRRL PRTY
- Nathaniel Rateliff & the Night Sweats
- Hippo Campus
- M. Ward
- Poliça
- Chance the Rapper
- The Flaming Lips

=== 2017 ===
Rock the Garden 2017 was held July 22 in the newly renovated Minneapolis Sculpture Garden.

- Bon Iver
- The Revolution
- Benjamin Booker
- Car Seat Headrest
- Margaret Glaspy
- Dead Man Winter
- Bruise Violet
- Dwynell Roland

=== 2018 ===
Rock the Garden 2018 was held on June 16.

- Father John Misty
- Low Cut Connie
- Chastity Brown
- U.S. Girls
- Nikki Lane
- Kamasi Washington
- P.O.S (rapper)
- Feist (singer)

=== 2019 ===
Rock the Garden 2019 was held on June 29.

- The National
- Courtney Barnett
- X
- Heart Bones (Sabrina Ellis and Har Mar Superstar)
- Bad Bad Hats
- Dem Atlas
- Adia Victoria
- The Beths

=== 2020 ===
Rock the Garden 2020 and 2021 have been cancelled due to the COVID-19 pandemic.

=== 2022 ===
Rock the Garden 2022 was held on June 11.

- Nathaniel Rateliff & The Night Sweats
- Sleater-Kinney
- LOW
- DāM-FunK
- Divide and Dissolve
- Beabadoobee
- Bombino
