= World of Joy =

Studio album by Howler
- Released: March 24, 2014
- Recorded: July 2013 at The Terrarium; Minneapolis, Minnesota
- Genres: Indie rock, garage rock, punk rock, surf rock
- Length: 27:30
- Label: Rough Trade Records
- Producer: Chris Heidman

Howler chronology
America Give Up (2012)	World of Joy (2014)

Professional ratings
Review scores
Source	Rating
AllMusic	3.5/5 stars
NME	8/10
Paste Magazine	7.5/10
Pitchfork	5.9/10

World of Joy is the second and final studio album released by the American indie rock band Howler on March 24, 2014, through Rough Trade.

== Background ==
World of Joy was recorded at the Terrarium in Minneapolis with America Give Up producer Chris Heidman. Some noted influences are The Byrds and Hüsker Dü. The band showcased a number of songs off the album during 89.3 The Current's 9th birthday party a First Avenue on January, 25th, 2014. It is the band's first and only album with drummer Rory MacMurdo.

== Track listing ==
All tracks are written by Jordan Gatesmith, except where noted.

No.	Title	Length
1.	"Al's Corral"	2:15
2.	"Drip" (Gatesmith, Ian Nygaard)	2:04
3.	"Don't Wanna"	2:19
4.	"Yacht Boys"	2:34
5.	"In the Red"	2:59
6.	"World of Joy" (Nygaard)	3:27
7.	"Louise"	2:36
8.	"Here's The Itch That Creeps Through My Skull" (Gatesmith, Nygaard, Rory Macmurdo)	3:17
9.	"Indictment"	3:25
10.	"Aphorismic Wasteland Blues"	2:34

== Personnel ==
- Jordan Gatesmith - Lead Guitar, Vocals, Bass, Drums
- Ian Nygaard - Guitar, Sitar, Vocals
- Max Petrek - Bass, Keyboard
- Rory MacMurdo - Drums
