= This One's Different =

This One's Different - EP

EP by Howler
- Released: August 1, 2011
- Genre: Indie rock, garage rock, surf rock
- Length: 13:48
- Label: Rough Trade

Howler chronology
This One's Different - EP (2011)	America Give Up (2012)

This One's Different is the first EP released by Minneapolis indie rock band Howler. It was released August 1, 2011, available as a limited 12" vinyl or download. The first 50 copies that were ordered from Rough Trade came with a free signed photo.

== Track listing ==
UK & US
Vinyl, CD & Download

All tracks are written by Jordan Gatesmith.

No.	Title	Length
1.	"I Told You Once"	2:55
2.	"This One's Different"	2:34
3.	"You Like White Women, I Like Cigarettes"	2:04
4.	"For All Concern"	2:37
5.	"14 Days"	3:38

== Reception ==
Professional ratings
Review scores
Source	Rating
BBC	favourable
Drowned in Sound	7/10 stars
NME	8/10 stars
Sputnik Music	3.5/5 stars

The EP received positive reviews from NME, Drowned In Sound and the BBC. Told You Once was also listed as the 9th best track of 2011 by NME.

== Music videos ==
There is an official video for main track (but not single) "I Told You Once" up on YouTube (but not uploaded under Howler's official account) that shows lead singer Jordan Gatesmith singing into a microphone in a dance studio, backed by singing dancers in leotards. The scene then cuts to Jordan just singing with two female dancers. Then it shows Jordan and guitarist, Ian Nygaard playing with knives in one of the band member's bedroom. The scenes goes back to the dancers until 1:50 when the guitar solo comes in. At this point, it shows Ian Nygaard playing his guitar into what looks like a web-cam. It then shows him lying in bed, tuning his guitar. The scene goes to and from Ian and the dancers. Then the video shows Ian playing with knives in his fingers. The camera cuts back to Jordan singing and then fades out. It was directed by So-TM and clocks at 2:53.

== 'America Give Up' Re-Recording And Title Changing ==
Howler's debut LP 'America Give Up' contains three tracks that were re-recorded from ‘This One's Different'. In an NME article about Howler's Minnesota Turf Club gig, it says: "It's rumoured Gatesmith considered leaving the song (I Told You Once) off their forthcoming LP, but on evidence of this grudging rendition, it sounds like he's decided to make "..Once" exhibit A for Howler's rapid evolution".
The Re-recorded Songs:
1. "This One's Different"
2. "You Like White Women, I Like Cigarettes" (Changed to "Wailing (Making Out)").
3. "I Told You Once" (Changed to "Told You Once")

The style of recording and production was noticeably "beefed up" (according to NME articles) for these re-recorded tracks.

== Lyrics ==
The lyrics of the songs stayed the same when they were re-recorded for "America Give Up" apart from a line from "You Like White Women, I Like Cigarettes", (the lyrics were changed as well as the name) : "Now there’s one thing that is true, you’re a bitch and I hate you" was changed to "Now there's one thing that is true, I need someone to play but I don't know who".
