= Hippo Campus =

American indie rock band

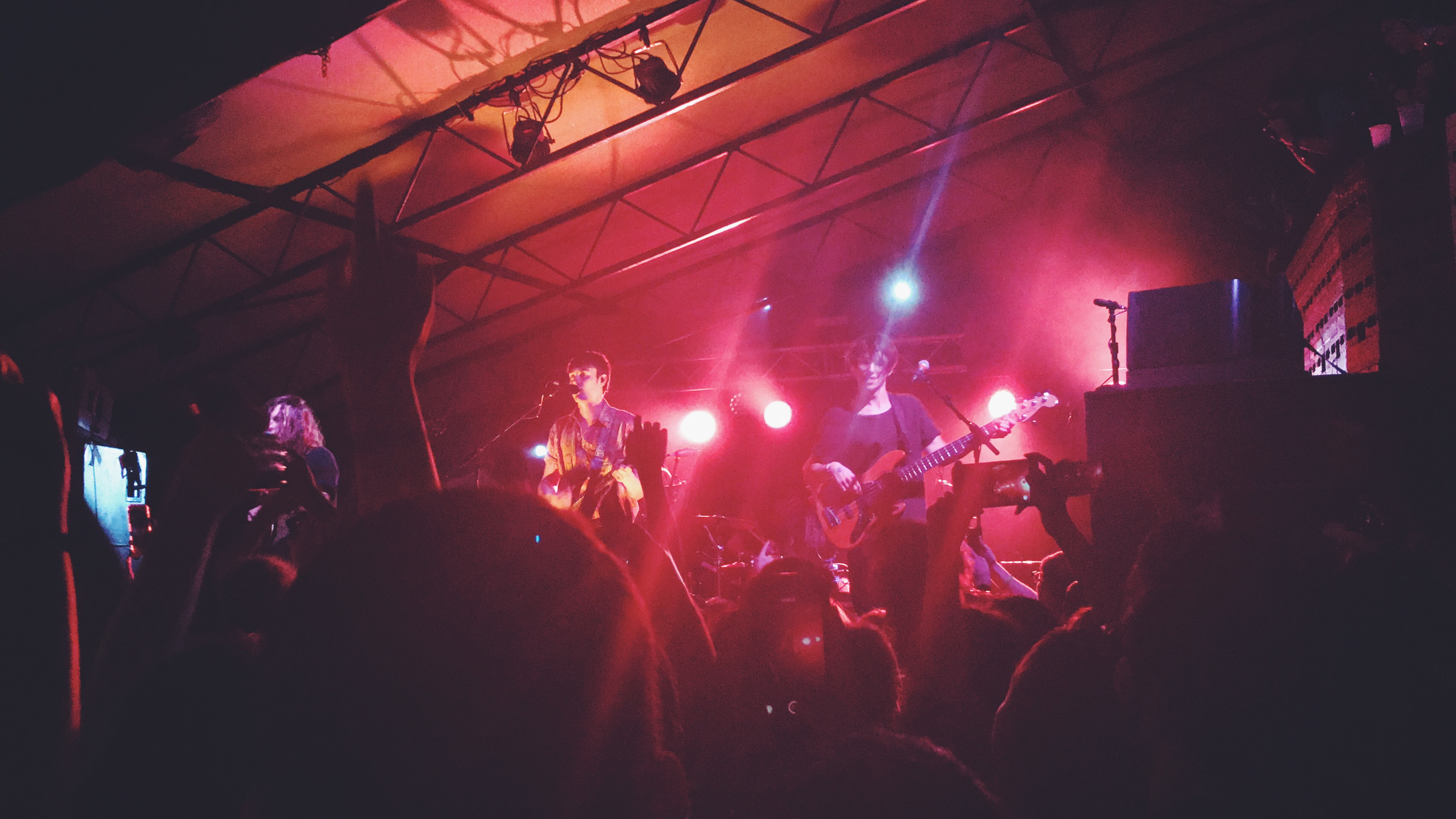
- Hippo Campus in 2017

Background information
- Origin: St. Paul, Minnesota
- Genres: Indie rock; indie pop; alternative rock; pop rock
- Years active: 2013–present
- Labels: Psychic Hotline, Grand Jury Records, Transgressive Records
- Members: Jake Luppen; Nathan Stocker; Zach Sutton; Whistler Allen; DeCarlo Jackson
- Website: hippocampus.band

Hippo Campus is an American indie rock band from Saint Paul, Minnesota. Their musical inclinations appear to be firmly rooted in the UK and Australia, drawing inspiration from artists such as Little Comets, Last Dinosaurs, Bombay Bicycle Club, and King Krule. They are signed to Psychic Hotline in the United States and Transgressive Records in the United Kingdom. The band has performed at South by Southwest, Lollapalooza, Bonnaroo, Summerfest and Reading and Leeds Festivals, Hinterland Music Festival, as well as on Conan. Hippo Campus were named one of NPR Music's favorite new artists of 2017.

== History ==
=== Formation (2013) ===
Hippo Campus was formed when Jake Luppen (lead vocals/guitar), Nathan Stocker (lead guitar/vocals), Zach Sutton (bass/keyboard), and Whistler Isaiah Allen (drums/vocals) met at the Saint Paul Conservatory for Performing Artists where they studied jazz, and Luppen trained in opera. SPCPA friend DeCarlo Jackson (trumpet) began playing regularly with them in 2017. Many of them played in other bands (Blatant Youth/Whistle Kid; Danger, Will Robinson/Northern) before uniting as Hippo Campus, a name Nathan Stocker chose while in psychology class. They often performed under their stage names The Turntan, Stitches, Espo, and Beans respectively, but no longer use the names on stage.

=== Tarzan Rejects EP (2013) ===
Hippo Campus recorded and released an EP entitled Tarzan Rejects in 2013. This EP consisted of five tracks, two of which are original recordings of the songs "Little Grace" and "South."

No.	Title	Length
1.	"Little Grace"	3:05
2.	"South"	3:51
3.	"I (Oh, I)"	4:24
4.	"Sula"	5:25
5.	"St. Paul Roofs"	4:02

=== Bashful Creatures and South EPs (2014–2016) ===
On November 18, 2014, Hippo Campus independently released their EP titled, Bashful Creatures, produced by Low's Alan Sparhawk. They later signed with Grand Jury records, and re-released Bashful Creatures with their new label on May 5, 2015. The band supported the release with an appearance at SXSW, and a performance on Conan. The EP featured two singles, "Little Grace" and "Suicide Saturday," and Hippo Campus did live sessions at KCRW's Morning Becomes Eclectic, and KEXP. On December 26, 2015, they appeared on the nationally broadcast CBS This Morning. Paste named them Best of What's Next in 2015.

On August 30, 2015, the band's song "The Halocline" was featured in the series finale of the TNT series Falling Skies and later they toured with Modest Mouse, Walk the Moon, The Mowgli's, Rubblebucket, Vacationer, My Morning Jacket, and they made an appearance at Lollapalooza in Chicago, Summerfest in Milwaukee, Rock the Garden in Minneapolis, and Reading and Leeds Festivals in the United Kingdom.

Hippo Campus released their second EP, South in October 2015. South went to #16 on the Billboard Heatseekers chart.

=== Landmark and warm glow EP (2016–2018) ===
The band released the single "Boyish" prior to their first full-length album, the guitar-based Landmark, which came out February 24, 2017. The #3 Billboard Heatseeker album was produced by BJ Burton, who produced albums for Low and Bon Iver.

Landmark was described by the Minneapolis Star Tribune as "loaded with thickly cushioned ambiance, billowy melodies and concisely written songs." Their second single from the album was "Way It Goes," which they performed on their second appearance on the Conan show.

They played a sold-out show at the iconic venue First Avenue in March 2017, and then Hippo Campus embarked on an international headline tour. That summer they played Bonnaroo Festival in Manchester, Tennessee and Lollapalooza in Chicago.

Hippo Campus next released a self-produced three-song EP called warm glow on September 12, 2017.

In spring and summer 2018, Hippo Campus performed at Sasquatch! Music Festival in George, Washington, and again at Reading and Leeds Festivals in the UK, and opened for Sylvan Esso at Red Rocks in Morrison, Colorado.

=== Bambi and Demos (2018–2020) ===
The band's sophomore album, Bambi, released September 28, 2018, was preceded by the singles "Passenger," "Golden," and "Bambi." Once again produced by BJ Burton, the Boston Globe noted that it was "a massive step forward" as the band used more synthesizer and programmed drums.

Hippo Campus headlined their own tour from Fall 2018 into Winter 2019 across the United States, the United Kingdom and Europe. They did a live session at WFUV radio, among other similar appearances.

In Fall 2018, they performed at venues like Chicago’s Riviera Theater and New York City’s Terminal 5 and UK indie hotspot SWX Nightclub in Bristol on their Bambi Tour.

In March 2019, Hippo Campus performed in two countries in Asia. During the summer of 2019, Hippo Campus joined their tour with The Head and the Heart, opening at venues such as Red Rocks for two sold out shows.

During June and July 2019, the band released two demo albums. Demos I was released on June 14, 2019 and consisted of early/alternate versions of songs that had been previously released on Bambi. Demos II was released on July 10, 2019 and consisted of songs that were worked on during the same time as Bambi, but not included on the album.

The band's frontman, Jake Luppen, released his debut solo album as "Lupin" in October 2020.

=== Good Dog, Bad Dream EP, LP3 and Wasteland EP (2021–2023) ===
On August 6, 2021, the band released the EP Good Dog, Bad Dream.

Hippo Campus released the single "Boys" on October 18, 2021, alongside which they announced an upcoming album, LP3. The singles "Semi Pro," "Ride or Die," and "Bang Bang" followed "Boys" in the lead up to LP3's release on February 4, 2022.

On February 16, 2023, Hippo Campus announced the release of a new single titled "Kick in the Teeth," which was released on February 21.

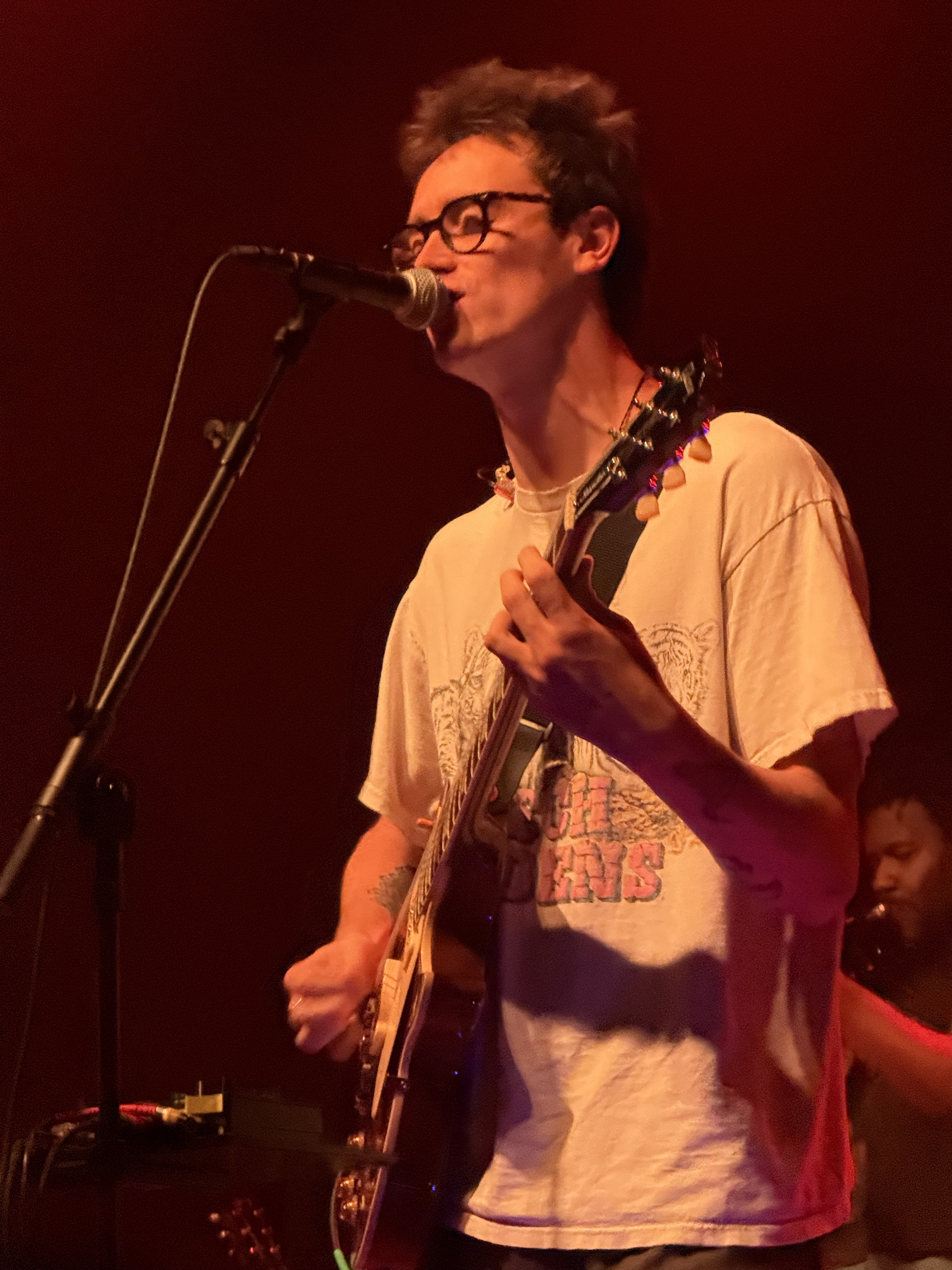
Jake Luppen, lead singer of American indie rock band, Hippo Campus, playing at The Atlantic in Washington, DC on September 25, 2024. The band played a series of more intimate venues at the beginning of their Flood tour.

On April 14, 2023 Hippo Campus released an EP titled Wasteland that consisted of five tracks. Inspired by the sounds of country music, the EP marked a change in sound from their previous records. Dork described the album as a "succinct package hurtling Hippo Campus in an unexpected but exciting direction."

On June 23, 2023, the band released a cover of the Yeah Yeah Yeahs song "Maps" in collaboration with Luppen’s wife, Raffaella.

=== Flood (2024–present) ===
On April 30, 2024, Hippo Campus released the single "Everything At Once" with an accompanying music video, marking the band's first release with Psychic Hotline as their record label. A second single, "Tooth Fairy," was released on June 4, 2024.

On July 16, 2024, the single "Paranoid" was released alongside the announcement of a new album titled Flood due for release on September 20, 2024. On August 13, 2024, "Forget It," the final single for Flood, was released.

A North America tour for Flood began in 2025, kicking off in Nashville, Tennessee on January 28, 2025 and concluded in Minneapolis at Surly Festival Field on May 31, 2025. Touring accompaniment included Mei Simones, Petey, and Hotline TNT.

The band toured with The Lumineers for multiple dates across their Automatic World Tour.

== Philanthropy ==
As part of the MeToo movement, Hippo Campus teamed up with the Women's Foundation of Minnesota to help donate profits from their merchandise sales to that foundation. They partnered with Normal Parents and Everytown For Gun Safety selling special "Thoughts and Prayers" T-shirts to raise awareness.

== Headlining tours ==
- Spring Tour (2016)
- June Tour (2016)
- Landmark Tour (2017)
- Winter Tour (2018)
- Bambi Tour (2018 - 2019)
- LP3 Tour (2022)
- Wasteland Tour (2023)
- Flood Tour (2024)

== Band members ==
- Jake Luppen – lead vocals, guitar (2013–present)
- Nathan Stocker – lead guitar, vocals (2013–present)
- Zach Sutton – bass guitar, keyboards, vocals (2013–present)
- Whistler Allen – drums, vocals (2013–present)
- DeCarlo Jackson – trumpet, flugelhorn, acoustic guitar, percussion (2017–present)
- Samuel Calvo* – keyboards (2023–present)

*Touring Member

== Discography ==
=== Studio albums ===
Title	Details
Landmark	Released: February 24, 2017; Label: Grand Jury
Bambi	Released: September 28, 2018; Label: Grand Jury
LP3	Released: February 4, 2022; Label: Grand Jury
Flood	Released: September 20, 2024; Label: Psychic Hotline

=== Demo albums ===
Title	Details
Demos I	Released: June 14, 2019; Label: Grand Jury
Demos II	Released: July 10, 2019; Label: Grand Jury

=== Extended plays ===
Title	Details
Tarzan Reject	Released: October 4, 2013; Label: Independent
Bashful Creatures	Released: November 18, 2014; Label: Independent
South	Released: October 2, 2015; Label: Grand Jury
Warm Glow	Released: September 12, 2017; Label: Grand Jury
Good Dog, Bad Dream	Released: August 6, 2021; Label: Grand Jury
Wasteland	Released: April 14, 2023; Label: Grand Jury

=== Singles ===
Title	Year	Album
"Little Grace"	2015	Bashful Creatures
"Suicide Saturday"	2015	Bashful Creatures
"South"	2015	South
"Violet"	2015	South
"Boyish"	2016	Landmark
"Monsoon"	2016	Landmark
"Last Snowstorm of the Year"	2016	Non-album single
"Way It Goes"	2017	Landmark
"Western Kids"	2017	Landmark
"Passenger"	2018	Bambi
"Bambi"	2018	Bambi
"Golden"	2018	Bambi
"Bad Dream Baby"	2021	Good Dog, Bad Dream
"Boys"	2021	LP3
"Semi Pro"	2021	LP3
"Ride or Die"	2022	LP3
"Bang Bang"	2022	LP3
"Kick in the Teeth"	2023	Wasteland
"Yippie Ki Yay"	2023	Wasteland
"Moonshine"	2023	Wasteland
"Everything at Once"	2024	Flood
"Tooth Fairy"	2024	Flood
"Paranoid"	2024	Flood
"Forget It"	2024	Flood
