= Lulu (Trip Shakespeare album) =

Studio album by Trip Shakespeare
- Released: 1991
- Studio: Pachyderm (Cannon Falls, Minnesota)
- Genre: Pop
- Length: 54:43
- Label: A&M
- Producer: Trip Shakespeare, Justin Niebank

Trip Shakespeare chronology
Across the Universe (1990)	Lulu (1991)	Volt EP (1992)

Lulu is an album by the Minneapolis-based band Trip Shakespeare, released in 1991. The band supported the album with a North American tour. "Bachelorette" was a modern rock hit.

The album's title track, a possible tribute to Hüsker Dü, has the refrain, "Do you remember? Do you recall?" Those words are printed in large type on the album's liner notes, with the last phrase altered to "dü you recall"; Hüsker Dü's name is Danish for "do you remember".

== Production ==
Recorded at Pachyderm Studios, the album was produced by the band and Justin Niebank. It was recorded live in the studio. Dan Wilson felt that it was the first Trip Shakespeare album over which the band had almost total creative control. The majority of the songs were written by Matt Wilson.

== Critical reception ==
Professional ratings
Review scores
Source	Rating
AllMusic	4.5/5 stars
Chicago Tribune	2.5/4 stars

The Philadelphia Daily News wrote that Trip Shakespeare "spins wry tales of simple sorts who're back in town—a guy obsessed by his girlfriend's mouth, another who's sadly watching his sweetheart move out, a woman who's wasting her life away working nights and weekends at a convenience store." The Chicago Tribune noted that Lulu "consists of power melody guitars and full-throated vocal harmonies, supported by John Munson's rubbery fretless bass and set into relief by Matt and Dan Wilson's honeyed lead vocals."

The Washington Post called the band "lightweight, tuneful and appealing in a slightly too-chirpy way." The Gazette determined that "the Wilsons are pop kleptomaniacs, lifting melodies as familiar as the girl next door and breathing life into them with perfect three-part full-colour harmonies."

AllMusic deemed the album "a melodically complex and romantic pop masterpiece," writing: "It is a rare instance in the music industry, major label or otherwise, to hear an album created by a group so obviously enchanted and inspired by each other, an album so loved and so toiled over that its contents continue to give indefinitely, an album so steeped in worshiping beauty that no amount of criticism—positive or negative—can mangle or tarnish its crystalline brilliance."

== Track listing ==
1. "'None of the Regular Rules Were True...'" – 0:17
2. "Lulu" – 4:47
3. "Bachelorette" – 4:04
4. "Your Mouth" – 4:37
5. "Will You Be Found?" – 3:42
6. "Down My Block" – 3:15
7. "Jill Can Drive" – 5:21
8. "Look at the Moon" – 3:29
9. "Graveyard" – 3:38
10. "Bonneville" – 3:45
11. "Today You Move" – 4:57
12. "Patricia" – 6:36
13. "'...Down the Dusty Road'" – 0:48
14. "If You Miss Me" – 5:27
15. [Untitled track] – 2:47

== Personnel ==
- Elaine Harris – drums, percussion
- John Munson – bass, vocals
- Dan Wilson – guitar, piano, vocals
- Matt Wilson – guitar, piano, vocals
