= Are You Shakespearienced? =

1989 album by Trip Shakespeare

Studio album by Trip Shakespeare
- Released: 1989
- Studio: Gark (Minneapolis)
- Genre: Alternative rock
- Length: 36:26
- Label: Gark (original release), Clean/Twin/Tone (1998 re-release), Omnivore (2014 re-release)
- Producer: Trip Shakespeare

Trip Shakespeare chronology
| Applehead Man (1986) | Are You Shakespearienced? (1989) | Across the Universe (1990) |

Are You Shakespearienced? is the second studio album released by Minneapolis alternative rock band Trip Shakespeare. It was released in 1989 on Minneapolis indie label Gark Records, then reissued in 1998 on Minneapolis label Clean/Twin/Tone Records, and again in 2014 on Omnivore Recordings.

The album was the first to feature Dan Wilson, brother of founding member and main songwriter Matt Wilson, who had joined after the recording of Trip Shakespeare's debut, 1986's Applehead Man.

== Background ==
Recorded live in the studio without headsets, the album featured "Toolmaster of Brainerd," a song that "insanely links dairyland folklore with the enduring rock myth of guitar-hero supremacy."

"Toolmaster," according to Minneapolis City Pages, "perfectly captured the tension between Minneapolis ambition and outstate resignation that pretty much informs life in the Land of 10,000 Lakes."

== Reception ==
Professional ratings
Review scores
| Source | Rating |
|---|---|
| AllMusic | 4/5 stars |
| Blurt | 4/5 stars |

The album was well received by critics, and has grown over time to be considered by many fans perhaps the band's best album. Michael Toland of Blurt called the album an improvement over their debut, saying "the band expands its reach with more sophisticated and rock-oriented arrangements. The Tripsters make good use of their musicianly prowess with close interplay that avoids showboating, while Dan's addition gives the band extra vocal power." Timothy Monger of AllMusic said that "the ambitious harmonies and artful songwriting approach introduced on their 1986 debut Applehead Man became fully realized here ... They cast a captivating spell weaving tales that melded weird fantasy elements with a staunchly romantic regionalism." He also noted that several of the Shakespearienced songs became staples of the band's live shows for the rest of their career, such as the "riffy, harmony-stacked 'Reception' and the whimsical mini rock opera 'Toolmaster of Brainerd.'"

Scott Schinder of Trouser Press wrote that the album "shows increased depth and a more distinctive musical voice." The Chicago Reader's Bill Wyman, who had disliked the band's debut Applehead Man, was more positive towards Are You Shakespearienced?, calling it "the first example of the band's precipitous growth." But he also complained that "the production was about 20 years out of time" and that Matt Wilson's lyrics "seemed to be fast developing into an almost painful olio of Renaissance Faire flourishes, portentous apostrophes, and low-budget Keatsianisms."

== Songs ==
All tracks are written by Matt Wilson (music and lyrics) and Dan Wilson (music).

Are You Shakespearienced track listing
| No. | Title | Writer(s) | Length |
|---|---|---|---|
| 1. | "Diane" | | 3:06 |
| 2. | "The Lake" | | 3:50 |
| 3. | "Swing" | Matt Wilson | 4:36 |
| 4. | "Two Wheeler, Four Wheeler" | Matt Wilson | 2:49 |
| 5. | "Spirit" | Dan Wilson (music), Matt Wilson (lyrics) | 4:00 |
| 6. | "Thief" | | 3:25 |
| 7. | "Toolmaster of Brainerd" | Matt Wilson | 4:26 |
| 8. | "Vines" | Elaine Harris (music), John Munson (music), Dan Wilson (music), Matt Wilson (music and lyrics) | 5:46 |
| 9. | "Reception" | | 4:28 |
| Total length: | | | 36:26 |

== Personnel ==
Trip Shakespeare

- John Munson - bass (Note: Munson also plays banhu on "Diane", double bass on "The Lake", and sleigh bells on "Spirit")
- Matt Wilson - guitar, vocals (Note: Wilson also plays triangle and steel pipe on "Diane", piano and electric piano on "Spirit", synthesizer on "Vines", and gong and percussion on "Reception")
- Elaine Harris - drums, percussion (Note: Harris also plays tambourine on "Diane", sleigh bells on "Spirit", xylophone on "Thief" and "Vines", and gong on "Reception")
- Dan Wilson - guitar, piano, vocals (Note: Wilson also plays organ on "Two Wheeler, Four Wheeler" and tambourine on "Spirit")

Additional personnel

- The New Shakespearians - rap on "Toolmaster of Brainerd"

Production

- Trip Shakespeare - producing, engineering
- Dale Goulett - engineering
- Jay Leigh - engineering
- Daniel Corrigan - photography
- Dan Wilson - cover art work
- Dan Picasso - design and lettering
- Luke McGuff - typesetting
- Jay Perlman - emergency engineering
- Pete Chute - emergency engineering
