= The Flops =

US musical group

The Flops were a collaboration of John Munson (bassist of Semisonic and Trip Shakespeare) and Matt Wilson (frontman of Trip Shakespeare). They played several shows, mostly in Minneapolis, between 2001 and 2005. They covered material from the Trip Shakespeare days, Matt's solo efforts (Matt's 1998 CD, Burnt, White, and Blue) and some new material.

== History ==
In 2003 they released a CD titled "Ooh La La" with one music disc and one CD-ROM story disc (some of which were defective) called Ohh La La: A Tale of Love, Loss, Rock and Roll by Sam Magavern.

In late spring of 2005, John Munson began playing in a new trio, "The New Standards", featuring Chan Poling (of The Suburbs) and Steve Roehm.

In 2006 they contributed a performance of "On Top of Old Smokey" to the compilation Down by the Riverside: A Benefit for Reuben Lindh Family Services.

They announced in their farewell show (Mar 17, 2007) that they would be returning in the fall with a new band in full rock mode, but that they would be "leaving all their best songs behind". The new band was said to be called "the Dark Nights" and had a slight website at thedarknights.com which is no longer active.

At the Provention Concert (September 2, 2008 at the Fitzgerald Theater in St. Paul, Minnesota), John Munson and Matt Wilson performed as The Twilight Hours and announced that they will have a new album coming out in the fall.

== The Flops: Ooh La La track list ==
1. "Deep All the Way Down"
2. "Two Wheeler, Four Wheeler"
3. "Trick"
4. "Hello Caller"
5. "Drummer Like Me"
6. "Landing"
7. "Ooh La La"
8. "Travel Plans"
9. "Searchers"
10. "Face Up"
11. "Sun Is Coming"
12. "Reception"
13. "I'm in Love with a Girl" (cover of an Alex Chilton song)
14. "Susannah"
