= Blue Sky and the Devil =

Studio album by Trampled by Turtles
- Released: April 20, 2005
- Genre: Indie folk; progressive bluegrass
- Length: 41:13

Trampled by Turtles chronology
Songs from a Ghost Town (2004)	Blue Sky and the Devil (2005)	Trouble (2007)

Blue Sky and the Devil is the second studio release of Duluth, Minnesota bluegrass group Trampled by Turtles. In 2020, a vinyl edition was released through their record label Banjodad Records. The album was recorded at Dirty Old Town Studios. All songs are written by Dave Simonett except for 'Dog On A Leash' and 'Higher Calling' which were both written by Erik Berry.

== Track listing ==
All tracks are written by Dave Simonett, except where noted.

No.	Title	Writer(s)	Length
1.	"I'm a Target Too"		3:02
2.	"Nowhere to Hide"		3:04
3.	"Codeine"		3:09
4.	"Blue Sky and The Devil"		4:40
5.	"Dog on a Leash"	Erik Berry	2:42
6.	"The One to Save"		4:27
7.	"Written on the Wall"		2:28
8.	"Jars at Home"		2:09
9.	"Burn For Free"		3:29
10.	"Silver and Gold"		2:47
11.	"Dyin'"		4:13
12.	"Chippin' at my Jones"		1:46
13.	"Higher Calling"	Berry	3:17
Total length:			41:20

== Personnel ==
- Banjo, vocals – Dave Carroll
- Bass, vocals – Tim Saxhaug
- Guest, fiddle – Mary LaPlant
- Guitar, vocals – Dave Simonett
- Mandolin, vocals – Erik Berry
- Mastered by Eric Swanson
- Photography by Joe Cunningham, Pat Byrne
