= America Give Up =

Studio album by Howler
- Released: EU: January 16, 2012; USA: January 17, 2012
- Genre: Indie rock, surf music, garage rock
- Length: 31.09
- Label: Rough Trade
- Producer: Chris Heidman

Howler chronology
| This One's Different (2011) | America Give Up (2012) | World Of Joy (2014) |

Professional ratings
Review scores
| Source | Rating |
|---|---|
| AllMusic | 3/5 stars |
| The A.V. Club | B |
| BBC | favourable |
| The Fly | 4/5 stars |
| The Guardian | 4/5 stars |
| musicOMH | 4/5 stars |
| NME | 8/10 stars |
| Pitchfork | 6/10 stars |
| Q Magazine | 4/5 stars |

America Give Up is the debut studio album by American indie rock band Howler. The album was released on January 16, 2012, by Rough Trade Records.

On NME's top 50 albums of 2012, America Give Up was listed at #20.

== Track listing ==
All songs written by Howler, except track 9 written by Howler and Steve Cruze.

| No. | Title | Length |
|---|---|---|
| 1. | "Beach Sluts" | 3:09 |
| 2. | "Back to the Grave" | 2:12 |
| 3. | "This One's Different" | 2:33 |
| 4. | "America" | 2:57 |
| 5. | "Too Much Blood" | 4:06 |
| 6. | "Wailing (Making Out)" | 2:01 |
| 7. | "Pythagorean Fearem" | 2:27 |
| 8. | "Told You Once" | 2:53 |
| 9. | "Back of Your Neck" | 3:42 |
| 10. | "Free Drunk" | 3:27 |
| 11. | "Black Lagoon" | 2:29 |
| Total length: | | 31:50 |

== Music videos ==
The video for "Back of Your Neck" was released on YouTube under RoughTradeRecordsUK's account. It clocks at 3:11. The video mainly shows Howler "mucking about" in Minneapolis, filmed by a quite grainy camera. The only other really different scene is of Howler playing the song in a studio, mainly concentrating on Jordan. This footage seems to be made for the actual promo. There is a behind the scenes video on NME.com that was released before the actual video for "Back of Your Neck" It was directed by Robert Semmer and despite the fact that it was the shortened, edited, version of the song, the lyrics "but both of them fucking died" and "smoking as high as a crackpot" are uncensored.

== Charts ==
| Chart (2012) | Peak position |
|---|---|
| US Billboard Heatseekers | 30 |
