= Across the Universe (album) =

Across The Universe

Studio album by Trip Shakespeare
- Released: 1990
- Studio: Paisley Park (Chanhassen, Minnesota)
- Genre: Alternative rock
- Length: 40:55
- Label: A&M
- Producer: Fred Maher and Trip Shakespeare

Trip Shakespeare chronology
Are You Shakespearienced? (1989)	Across The Universe (1990)	Lulu (1991)

Across The Universe is an album released by Trip Shakespeare in 1990. It was the band's first release on A&M Records, the major label that they had signed with earlier in the year.

== Title ==
The title's echo of a particularly trippy Beatles song recalls lead songwriter Matt Wilson's preoccupation with the British Invasion band:

There's a part of us that's plainly trying to make epic, gorgeous music that can be admired on at least a couple of levels ... There are people who will say: "Rock 'n' roll is supposed to be simple, three-chord stuff like Keith Richards plays." But when you get right down to it, I guess we find ourselves more in the Beatles' school than in the Rolling Stones.

== Reaction ==
Professional ratings
Review scores
Source	Rating
AllMusic	4.5/5 stars

Trouser Press called Across the Universe a "too-rare example of an indie act benefiting musically from major-label treatment"—citing an "increased rock edge that doesn't detract from the gentle charm" of tracks like "Snow Days", "Gone, Gone, Gone" and "The Crane"—the latter being the closest thing the album had to a hit.

Newsday praised the album's "original melodies, soaring, driving hooks, and precise, daringly oddball lyrics", but complained that "the jokey tone often descends into feyness, then facetiousness," and said the "overbaked singing accentuates the overly florid lyrics of otherwise engaging songs". The Toronto Star called Across the Universe "odd stuff, but completely engaging."

The band was less than satisfied with the album. "We did not succeed on Across the Universe," Matt Wilson later said. "There was kind of a compromise between what the label wanted on there and what the band wanted." Despite this attempt to tailor the product for the record-buying public, Across the Universe sold a disappointing 33,000 copies—a showing characterized by Wilson as "bad, really bad."

== Songs ==
The album opens with "Turtledove", described as "a love song written, logically enough, from the point of view of a male bird."

"Pearle" is a murder ballad rerecorded from the band's self-released debut album, Applehead Man. The "new version...demonstrates how much Trip has grown; the playing is more confident and interactive than ever, with an increased rock edge," wrote Trouser Press.

Calling "Snow Days" "Trip Shakespeare at its best", Newsday described it as "an eccentric blues about the kind of blizzard that shuts down school...a lovely evocation of childhood in the Minnesota winter."

"Every time we worked on the song in the studio, it seemed to snow," bassist John Munson claimed of "Snow Days". "When we were mixing the song in New York, it snowed there for the first time in years on Thanksgiving," said Matt Wilson.

"Drummer Like Me" is said to "credibly capture the social misfortunes of the band member who often gets the least respect."

"The Slacks" has been called a "tale of strange sexual discovery", and "a naughty dance song about a one-eyed lady from France with a fatal weakness for magic trousers."

The lyrics of "Honey Tree" were co-written by Matt and Dan Wilson—the first Trip Shakespeare words not credited solely to Matt. "The honey tree is someplace beyond this world", Dan said of the song. "The garden where that romance takes place is other-earthly. It's real, in the same way that a dream is real".

== Track listing ==
All music by Matt Wilson and Dan Wilson except as indicated. All lyrics by Matt Wilson except "Honey Tree" by Matt Wilson and Dan Wilson.

1. "Turtledove" – 3:36
2. "Pearle" (Matt Wilson, Larry Abitz) – 3:46
3. "Snow Days" (Matt Wilson) – 4:04
4. "Drummer Like Me" (Matt Wilson) – 3:50
5. "Gone, Gone, Gone" – 4:41
6. "The Slacks" (Matt Wilson) – 4:00
7. "Unlucky Lady" – 2:35
8. "The Nail" – 3:11
9. "The Crane" – 3:24
10. "Late" – 3:28
11. "Honey Tree" (John Munson, Matt Wilson) – 4:20
