= Trip Shakespeare =

Alternative rock band from Minneapolis

- Origin: Minneapolis, Minnesota, U.S.
- Genre: Alternative rock
- Labels: Restless; Twin/Tone; A&M
- Spinoffs: Semisonic
- Past members: Elaine Harris; John Munson; Matt Wilson; Tim Rowe; Dan Wilson

Trip Shakespeare was an American rock band formed in Minneapolis, Minnesota and active from the mid-1980s to early-1990s. The band included Dan Wilson and John Munson, who would later go on to be founding members of Semisonic.

== Origins ==
The band originated when Harvard University English student Matt Wilson (guitar/vocals) teamed up with Elaine Harris (drums), a Harvard grad student in biological anthropology, in the early 1980s. Harris had responded to a notice posted by Wilson seeking "wicked percussion hands."

Matt Wilson and Munson had played together in an earlier band (E Brown), and Wilson had not been impressed by his bass playing, so he didn't want Munson to audition for the new band. "But he came over anyway and played, and he'd improved a lot," Wilson later recalled. "We ended up begging him to just give it a try and stay around."

In 1986 drummer Tim Rowe, who had played with Munson in several other bands, joined the group as percussionist. They performed as a quartet for several months before Rowe left the band during the recording of Applehead Man to join The Nietzsches with the former guitarist for E. Brown, Jimmy Harry.

Matt Wilson originally proposed that the band be named Kirk Shakespeare, after two of his heroes: James T. Kirk and William Shakespeare. "I think maybe John and Elaine didn't want to be in a band named after Matt's two heroes, so they changed Kirk to Trip," explained Dan Wilson, Matt's older brother, who joined the band later. In an interview with the Chicago Reader's Bill Wyman, Matt Wilson suggested that Dan was convinced to join by the quality and potential suggested by Applehead Man: "We sent him the first record almost as a demo tape, to get him to join up, and kept telling him how serious we were."

== History ==
=== Applehead Man ===
In 1986, the trio self-released their debut album. "The first album, Applehead Man, we just put all the songs we knew on there," Matt Wilson later said. One of these was the title track, which described a head being carved from "the brightest fruit...furthest from the road on the apple farm."

=== Are You Shakespearienced? ===
With its lineup complete, the band released a follow-up album, Are You Shakespearienced?, on the Minneapolis-based independent label Gark Records in 1988. Recorded live in the studio without headsets, the album featured "Toolmaster of Brainerd," a song that "insanely links dairyland folklore with the enduring rock myth of guitar-hero supremacy." Hailing from "Brainerd where the children go to milking school," the Toolmaster

learned to play the Gibson that his dog had found
And he came to haunt the bars of Minneapolis town.

"Toolmaster," according to the Twin Cities alternative new weekly paper City Pages, "perfectly captured the tension between Minneapolis ambition and outstate resignation that pretty much informs life in the Land of 10,000 Lakes."

=== Across the Universe ===
The next year they signed with A&M Records. The label "really gave us a chance," Matt Wilson later said:

"They spent a lot of money on us making the records. A lot of people at the label genuinely seemed to love the band. The president of the label showed up at our gigs and got all psyched up and said this was not a vanity project on the part of the label. They really thought that we could sell some records. They really thought they could mass market Trip Shakespeare.

The band's first release on A&M was Across the Universe, released in 1990. The album was titled in homage to the Beatles song of the same name. Matt Wilson later explained:

There's a part of us that's plainly trying to make epic, gorgeous music that can be admired on at least a couple of levels. And there's another part of us that's embarrassed about that, because there are people who will say: "Rock 'n' roll is supposed to be simple, three-chord stuff like Keith Richards plays." But when you get right down to it, I guess we find ourselves more in the Beatles' school than in the Rolling Stones'.

TrouserPress.com called Across the Universe a "too-rare example of an indie act benefiting musically from major-label treatment"—citing an "increased rock edge that doesn't detract from the gentle charm" of tracks like "Snow Days," "Gone, Gone, Gone" and "The Crane"—the latter being the closest thing the album had to a hit.

The band members were less satisfied with the results. "We did not succeed on Across the Universe, Matt Wilson later said. "There was kind of a compromise between what the label wanted on there and what the band wanted." "If anyone was satisfied by that compromise, it wasn't the record-buying public." Across the Universe sold only 33,000 copies.

=== Lulu ===
Trip Shakespeare's final major release was 1991's Lulu. Upon its release, Matt Wilson declared: "On Lulu, we finally got it right. We got the order of songs down, and spent a lot of time honing it and making it an emotional journey. We wanted the listener to be completely moved and left breathless by the music." In another interview, he called it "the first record where we actually had our heads together well enough—and a had a sense of who we were, enough—to try to control it."

This approach appeared to succeed, drawing positive commentary from critics. AllMusic.com called the album a "melodically complex and romantic pop masterpiece," and "an album so steeped in worshipping beauty that no amount of criticism—positive or negative-—can mangle or tarnish its crystalline brilliance." In spite of the warm reception, Lulu was another disappointment in terms of sales, moving 60,000 copies.

=== Volt ===
After assembling a demo for a proposed fifth album of cover songs, A&M approached their promotions department, whose response upon hearing the album was "What do we do with this?" according to Munson. The label then dropped the band; the covers album was released by Twin/Tone as Volt in 1992.

Trip Shakespeare's commercial failure has been attributed to the band's poor timing: "1991 was the great embrasure of the grunge movement when Nirvana's Nevermind set the decade-long trend for the popular music charts," wrote AllMusic.com. "The release of a melodically complex and romantic pop masterpiece with lush vocals was entertained by neither the critics nor the masses." Wayne Isaak, the head of A&M's New York office, put it, "Trip Shakespeare is too pop to catch on as an alternative band; the alternative scene is very cliquish."

=== Breakup ===
The band broke up shortly after the release of Lulu. The Wilson brothers and Munson continue to play together in various projects. Matt Wilson joined various Minneapolis bands. Munson and Matt Wilson performed as The Flops, later renamed The Twilight Hours; Matt Wilson contributed some vocals and synthesizer work to Semisonic's All About Chemistry album; Matt Wilson joined Semisonic on December 12 and 13, 2003 to play a set of Trip Shakespeare favorites for sold-out crowds at First Avenue in Minneapolis. Munson and both Wilsons reunited in October 2010 to perform for a benefit concert. Dan Wilson and John Munson joined Jacob Slichter to form Pleasure, which was later named Semisonic, Elaine Harris returned to the Boston area and had not been involved in any post-Trip Shakespeare events until The New Standards' December 7, 2013 holiday show, when she joined John, Matt, and Dan for two songs, "Susannah", and "Snow Days."

Near the end of the band's run, Matt Wilson said that the band's goal was "to be a part of that one or two nights that everybody has in their life when the music is ridiculously good and the people around you are laughing their heads off and losing their minds.... We don't get it every night because you can't carry that kind of ecstasy around with you in a bucket. All we do is try to find that delirious point."

=== Reunion ===
On December 7, 2013, Trip Shakespeare reunited to play two songs at The New Standards' 8th annual holiday show. This was the first time the primary lineup of the band had played together live in over 20 years.

=== Honors and awards ===
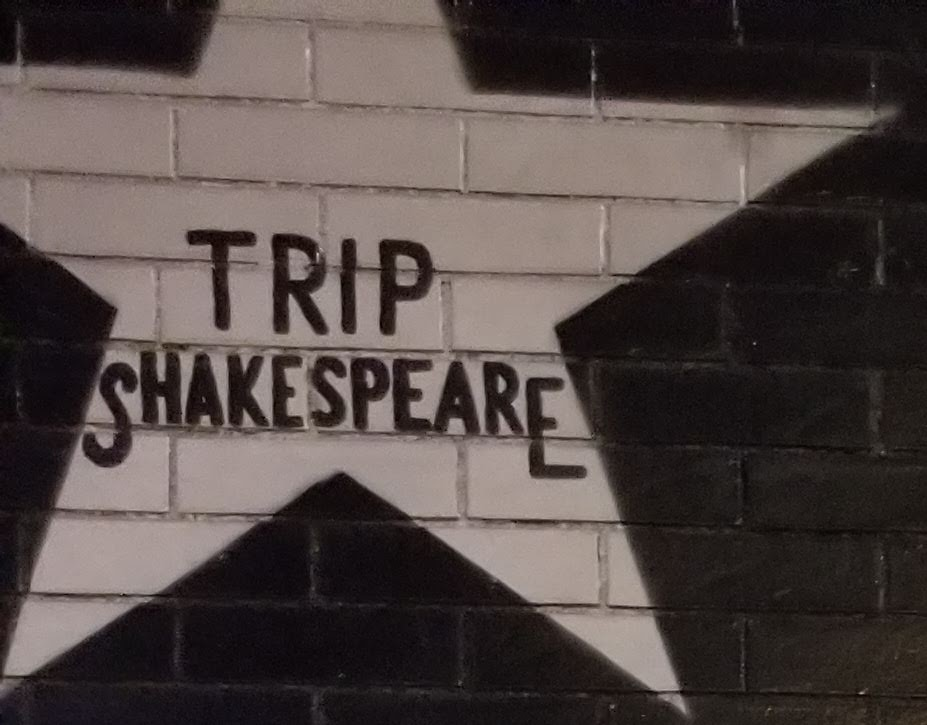
Trip Shakespeare's star on the outside mural of the Minneapolis nightclub First Avenue

The band has been honored with a star on the outside mural of the Minneapolis nightclub First Avenue, recognizing performers that have played sold-out shows or have otherwise demonstrated a major contribution to the culture at the iconic venue. Receiving a star "might be the most prestigious public honor an artist can receive in Minneapolis," according to journalist Steve Marsh. Dan Wilson and Munson's subsequent group, Semisonic, also has a star, making them among the few musicians with multiple stars on the mural.

== Discography ==
- Applehead Man (Gark Records, 1986; Clean/Twin/Tone Records re-release, 1998; Omnivore Recordings re-release with bonus tracks, 2014)
- Are You Shakespearienced? (Gark Records, 1988; Clean/Twin/Tone Records re-release, 1998; Omnivore Recordings re-release with bonus tracks, 2014)
- Across the Universe (A&M Records, 1990)
- Lulu (A&M Records, 1991)
- Volt EP (Clean/Twin/Tone Records, 1992)
