= Landmark (Hippo Campus album) =

Studio album by Hippo Campus
- Released: February 24, 2017
- Recorded: Flowers Studio, Minneapolis, Minnesota
- Genre: Indie rock • Dance Rock • Post-Punk Revival
- Length: 44:22
- Label: Grand Jury Music / Transgressive
- Producer: BJ Burton

Hippo Campus chronology
South - EP (2015)	Landmark (2017)	warm glow (2017)

Singles from Landmark
- 1. "Boyish" Released: October 11, 2016; 2. "Monsoon" Released: November 21, 2016; 3. "Way It Goes" Released: January 16, 2017; 4. "Western Kids" Released: June 13, 2017

Professional ratings
Review scores
Source	Rating
AllMusic	3.5/5 stars
Indie Is Not A Genre	4/5 stars
The Spill Magazine	4/5 stars

Landmark is the debut studio album by American rock band Hippo Campus. It was released on February 24, 2017, through Grand Jury Music and Transgressive Records.

== Track listing ==
No.	Title	Length
1.	"Sun Veins"	1:19
2.	"Way It Goes"	4:05
3.	"Vines"	2:39
4.	"Epitaph"	4:16
5.	"Simple Season"	3:27
6.	"Tuesday"	3:16
7.	"Western Kids"	3:15
8.	"Poems"	5:24
9.	"Monsoon"	3:43
10.	"Vacation"	4:35
11.	"Boyish"	3:24
12.	"Interlude"	1:12
13.	"Buttercup"	3:47
Total length:		44:22

== Personnel ==
=== Hippo Campus ===
- Jake Luppen – lead vocals, guitar
- Nathan Stocker – guitar, backing vocals
- Zach Sutton – bass, backing vocals
- Whistler Allen – drums, backing vocals

=== Additional musicians ===
- DeCarlo Jackson – brass

=== Production ===
- Producer and Mixing – BJ Burton

== Charts ==
Chart	Peak position
US Billboard 200	140
US Top Alternative Albums (Billboard)	15
US Top Rock Albums (Billboard)	24
US Vinyl Albums (Billboard)	14
