= Trampled by Turtles =

American bluegrass/folk-rock band

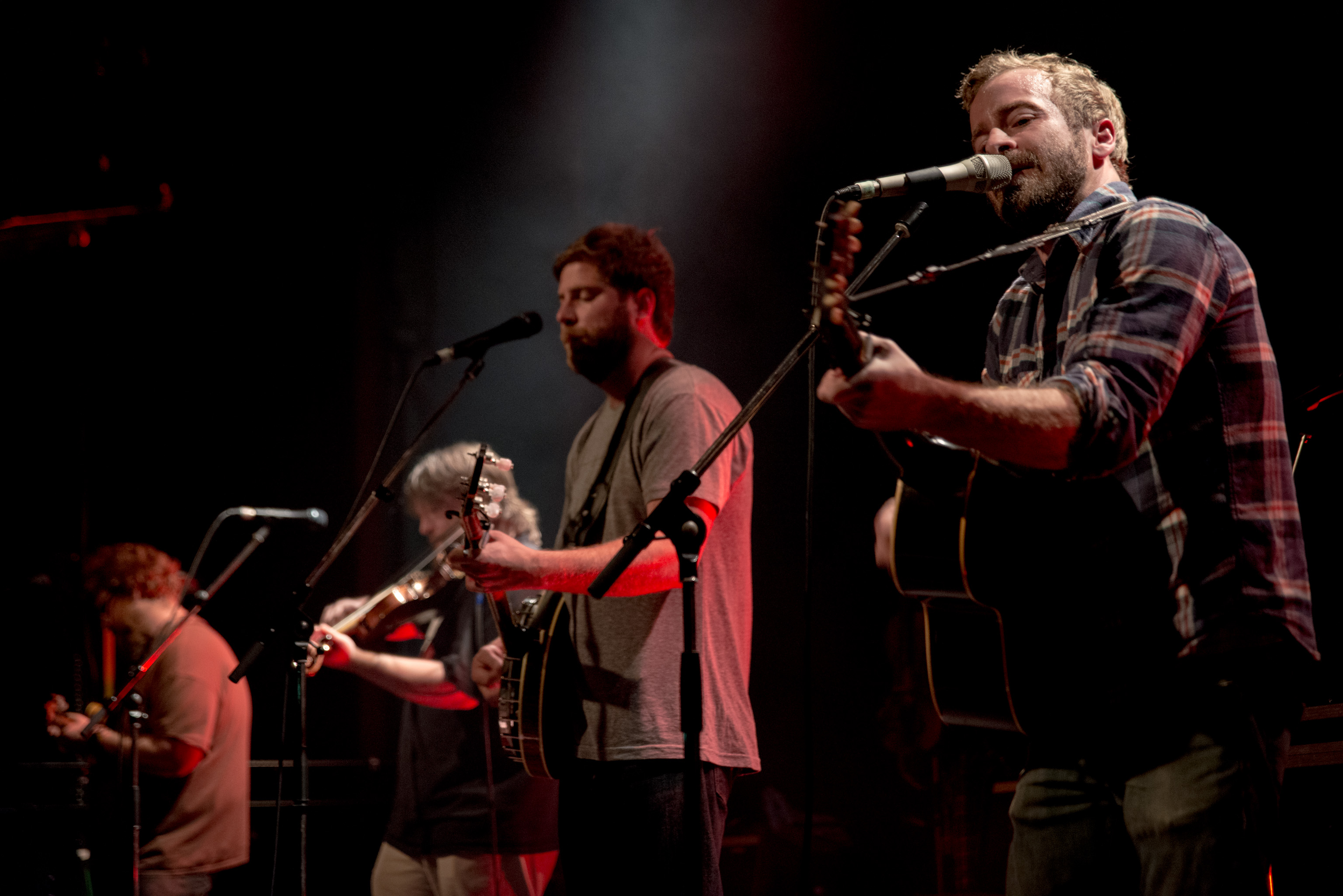
- Trampled by Turtles performing at Kranhalle in Munich, Germany, November 2014

Background information
- Origin: Duluth, Minnesota, U.S.
- Genres: Indie folk; alternative country; progressive bluegrass
- Years active: 2003–present
- Label: Thirty Tigers
- Members: Dave Simonett; Tim Saxhaug; Dave Carroll; Erik Berry; Ryan Young; Eamonn McLain
- Website: trampledbyturtles.com

Trampled by Turtles is an American bluegrass-influenced folk band from Duluth, Minnesota. They have released ten full albums, three of which reached No. 1 on the U.S. Billboard bluegrass chart. Their fifth release, Palomino, stayed in the chart's Top 10 for 52 straight weeks. Their most recent album, Alpenglow, was released on October 28, 2022.

== Band members ==
- Dave Simonett – guitar, lead vocals, harmonica (2003–present)
- Tim Saxhaug – bass, backing vocals (2003–present)
- Dave Carroll – banjo, backing vocals (2003–present)
- Erik Berry – mandolin, backing vocals (2003–present)
- Ryan Young – fiddle, backing vocals (2007–present)
- Eamonn McLain – cello, backing vocals (2014–present)
Trampled by Turtles, live 2014

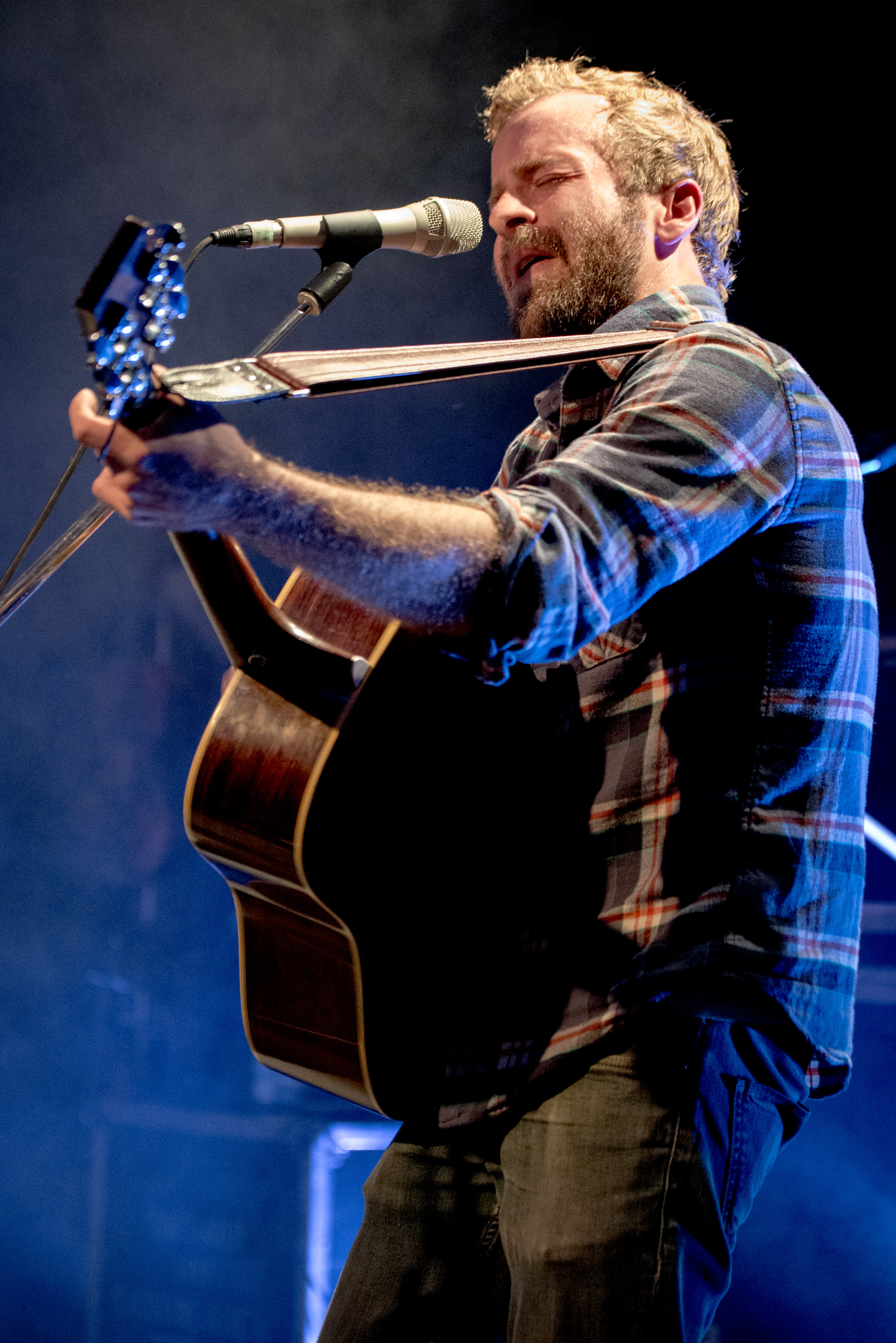
Dave Simonett

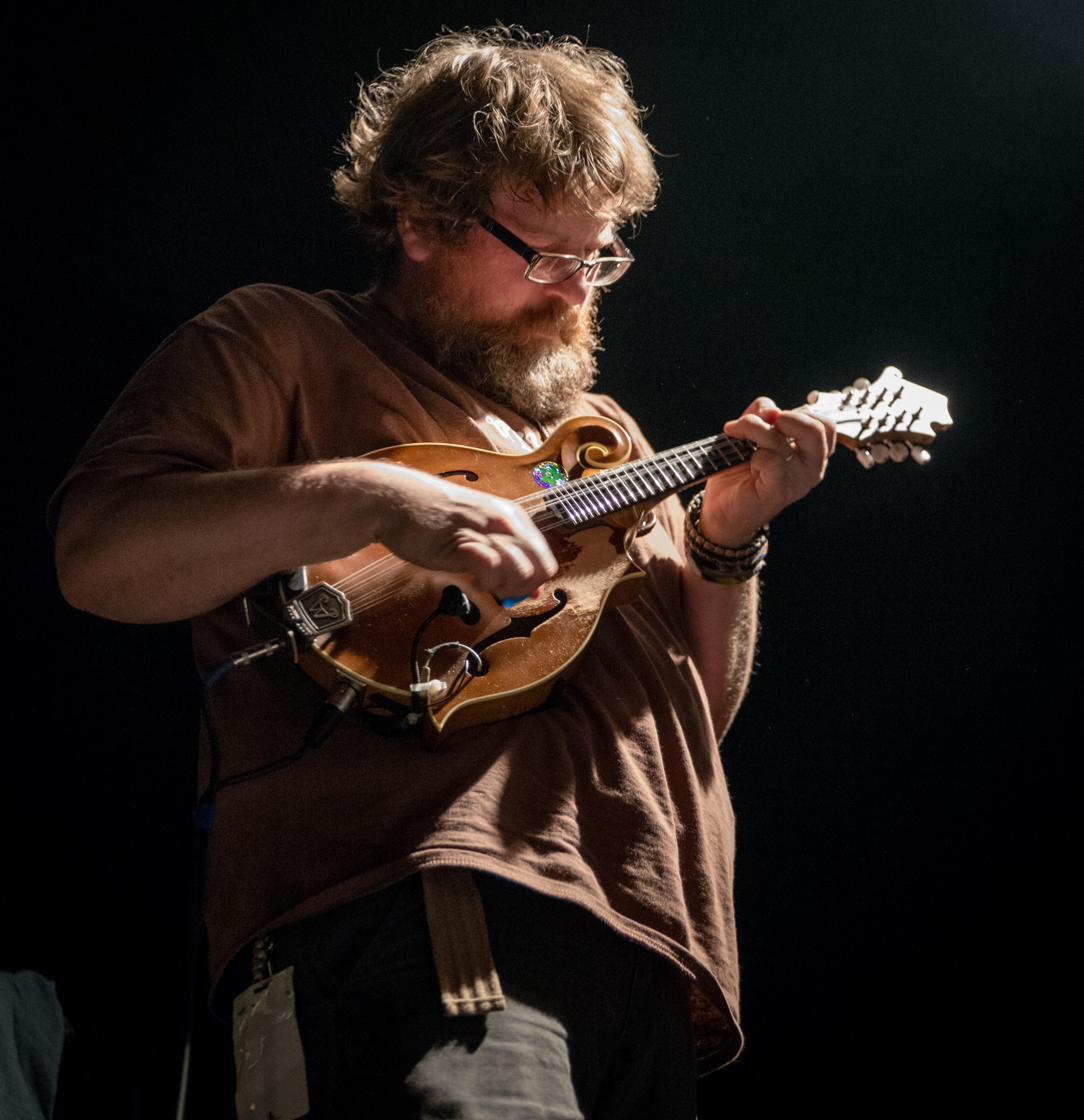
Erik Berry

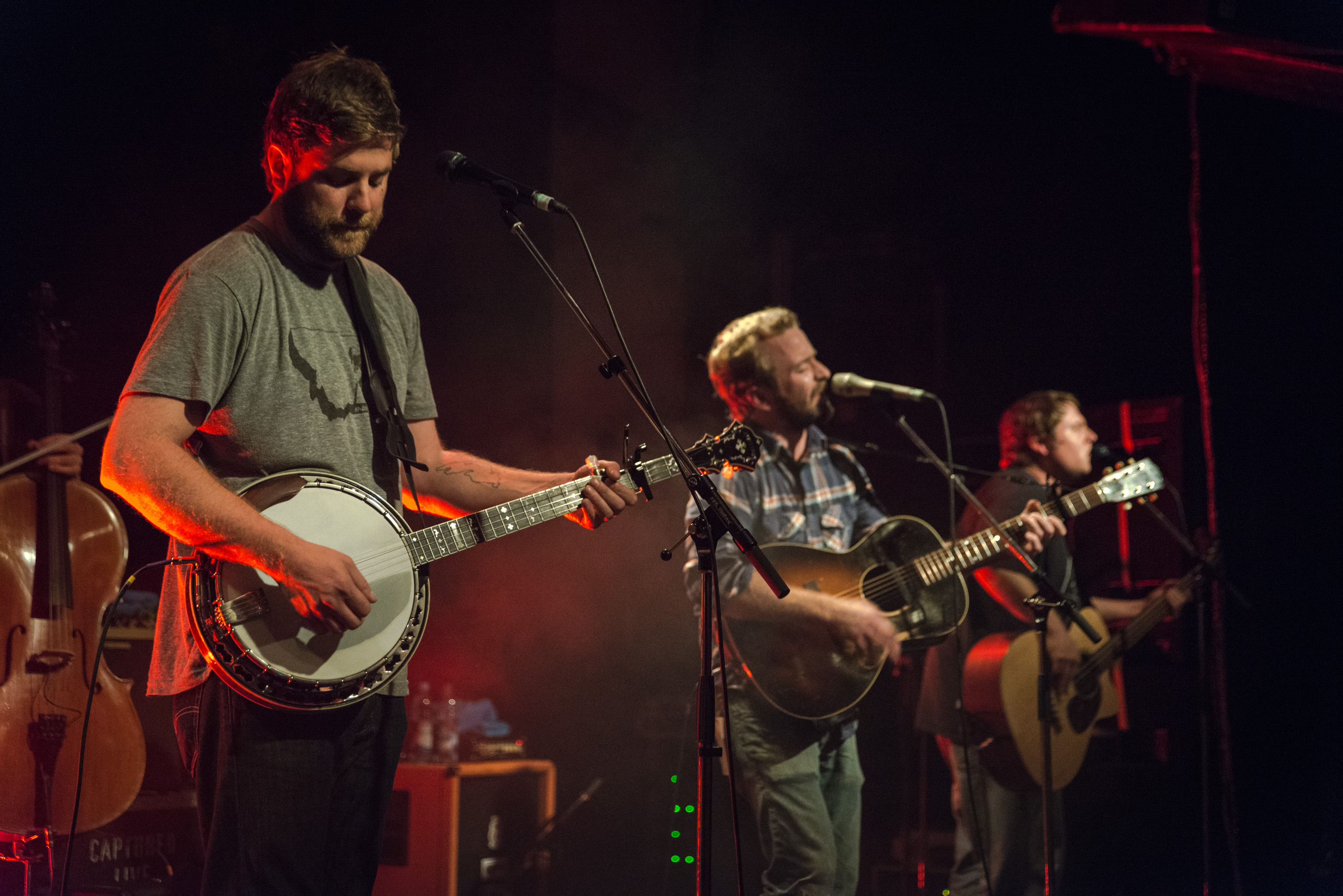
Dave Carroll

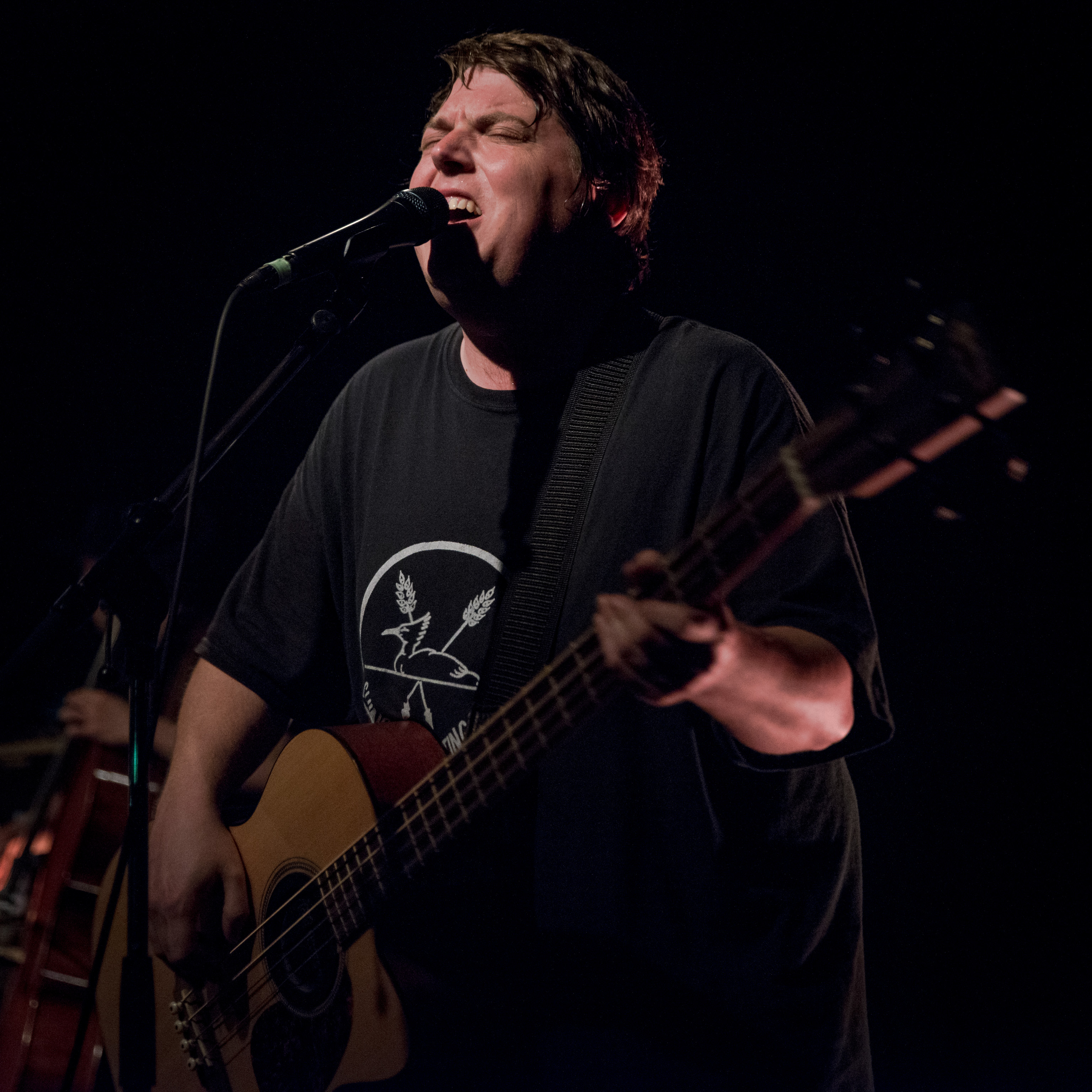
Tim Saxhaug

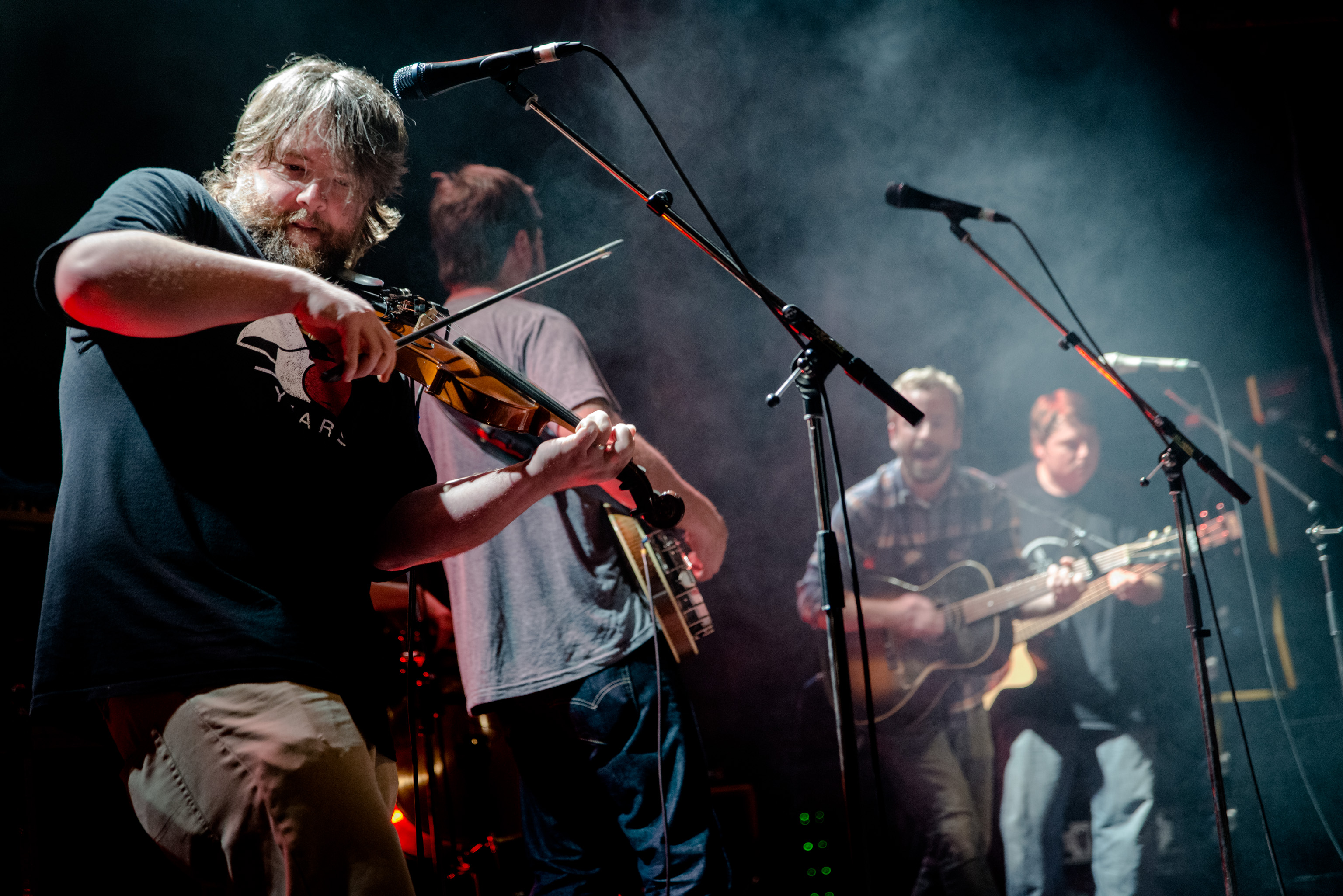
Ryan Young

== Origin and recognition ==
Trampled by Turtles' frontman, Dave Simonett, formed the band in 2003 as a side project. When Simonett's musical equipment was stolen in 2003, he was left with only an acoustic guitar. Simonett was restricted to genres such as bluegrass and folk—acoustic genres that did not rely on amplification. Simonett was a newcomer to the acoustic music scene, so he recruited other newcomers to the newly-formed band: fiddler Ryan Young (previously a drummer in a speed metal act), bassist Tim Saxhaug, mandolinist Erik Berry, and Dave Carroll on the banjo. They quickly adopted a distinctive sound, "fast, frenetic, that owed as much to rock & roll as bluegrass".

The band's name, "Trampled by Turtles", was suggested as a joke. Simonett explains in an interview that "'We all brought our lists of names to rehearsal one time, and we agreed to decide on the name that we hated the least, and that one stuck'". From the beginning, they've refused to limit themselves to a specific label or genre: "'I don't really know what to say when I'm asked that. I hesitate to say bluegrass because I'm familiar with that kind of music. I feel that is a genre that has set boundaries that, and anytime you stray out of that, you're not really considered a bluegrass band no matter what instruments you're playing on. I would say it's Americana with string instruments, but whatever anyone wants to call it, that's fine'".

Trampled by Turtles released 3 albums between 2004 and 2007: Songs from a Ghost Town (2004), Blue Sky and the Devil (2005), and Trouble (2007). However, their fourth album, Duluth, released in 2008, earned them recognition within the bluegrass community, with Duluth peaking at #8 on the Billboard bluegrass chart. Following this success, Trampled by Turtles were featured in several music festivals.

== Discography ==
=== Albums ===
Title	Album details	Peak chart positions						
Title	Album details	US Grass	US	US Heat	US Indie	US Alt	US Folk	US Rock
Songs from a Ghost Town	Release date: October 5, 2004; Label: Trampled by Turtles	—	—	—	—	—	—	—
Blue Sky and the Devil	Release date: April 20, 2005; Label: BanjoDad Records	—	—	—	—	—	—	—
Trouble	Release date: March 19, 2007; Label: BanjoDad	—	—	—	—	—	—	—
Duluth	Release date: October 30, 2008; Label: BanjoDad	8	—	—	—	—	—	—
Palomino	Release date: April 13, 2010; Label: BanjoDad	1	—	11	46	—	—	—
Stars and Satellites	Release date: April 10, 2012; Label: BanjoDad	1	32	—	7	11	2	13
Live at First Avenue	Release Date: November 12, 2013; Label: BanjoDad	31	—	9	47	—	—	—
Wild Animals	Release date: July 15, 2014; Label: BanjoDad	—	29	—	3	—	1	—
Life Is Good on the Open Road	Release date: May 4, 2018; Label: BanjoDad	1	133	—	11	—	7	—
Alpenglow	Release date: October 28, 2022; Label: BanjoDad	1	—	—	—	—	—	—
Alan Sparhawk with Trampled by Turtles (with Alan Sparhawk)	Release date: May 30, 2025; Label: Sub Pop Records	—	—	—	—	—	—	—
"—" denotes releases that did not chart

=== EPs ===
Year	Title	Label
2019	Sigourney Fever	BanjoDad
2024	Always Here	BanjoDad

=== Singles ===
Year	Title	Label
2011	"Where is My Mind?"	BanjoDad Records
2011	"Wait So Long" / "Disappear"	BanjoDad
2012	"Alone"	BanjoDad
2018	"Wildflowers"	BanjoDad
2022	"A Lifetime to Find"	BanjoDad
2025	"For Emma" feat. Sumbuck	BanjoDad

=== Music videos ===
Year	Video	Director
2010	"Wait So Long"	Justin Gustavison
2011	"Victory"	Justin Gustavison
2011	"Where Is My Mind?"	Justin Gustavison
2012	"Alone"	Justin Gustavison
2012	"Walt Whitman"	Jim Fortier/Dave Willis
2013	"Midnight on the Interstate"	Stephanie Erlandson
2014	"Are You Behind the Shining Star?"	Philip Harder
2014	"Wild Animals"	Philip Harder

== Appearances ==
The band has performed at many national festivals including Coachella, Bonnaroo, Stagecoach, Hardly Strictly Bluegrass, Bumbershoot, and Pickathon in Happy Valley, Oregon. In 2011, they performed at Telluride Bluegrass Festival, the Newport Folk Festival, Floydfest, Pilgrimage, and ROMP: Bluegrass Roots & Branches Festival. They played at San Francisco's Outside Lands Music and Arts Festival, the Sasquatch Festival, Bonnaroo, Lollapalooza, the Austin City Limits Music Festival, the Firefly Festival, Rock the Garden, the All Good Music Festival, and the Newport Folk Festival in 2012.

Trampled by Turtles made their national television debut April 24, 2012 on Late Show with David Letterman. They returned to the program on July 16, 2014 to play songs from their Wild Animals album.

== Features ==
The band's single, "Are You Behind The Shining Star?" was featured in The Troubadour's Road Top 25 Songs of 2014. Their music has been featured in TV shows including Deadliest Catch and Squidbillies.

"Alone," one of their songs, was featured at the end of the 2013 movie The Way Way Back. Another song, "Codeine" was featured in the 2018 video game Far Cry 5. Their song "Ghosts" was featured in the Showtime series "Ray Donovan" in January 2019.

== Honors and awards ==
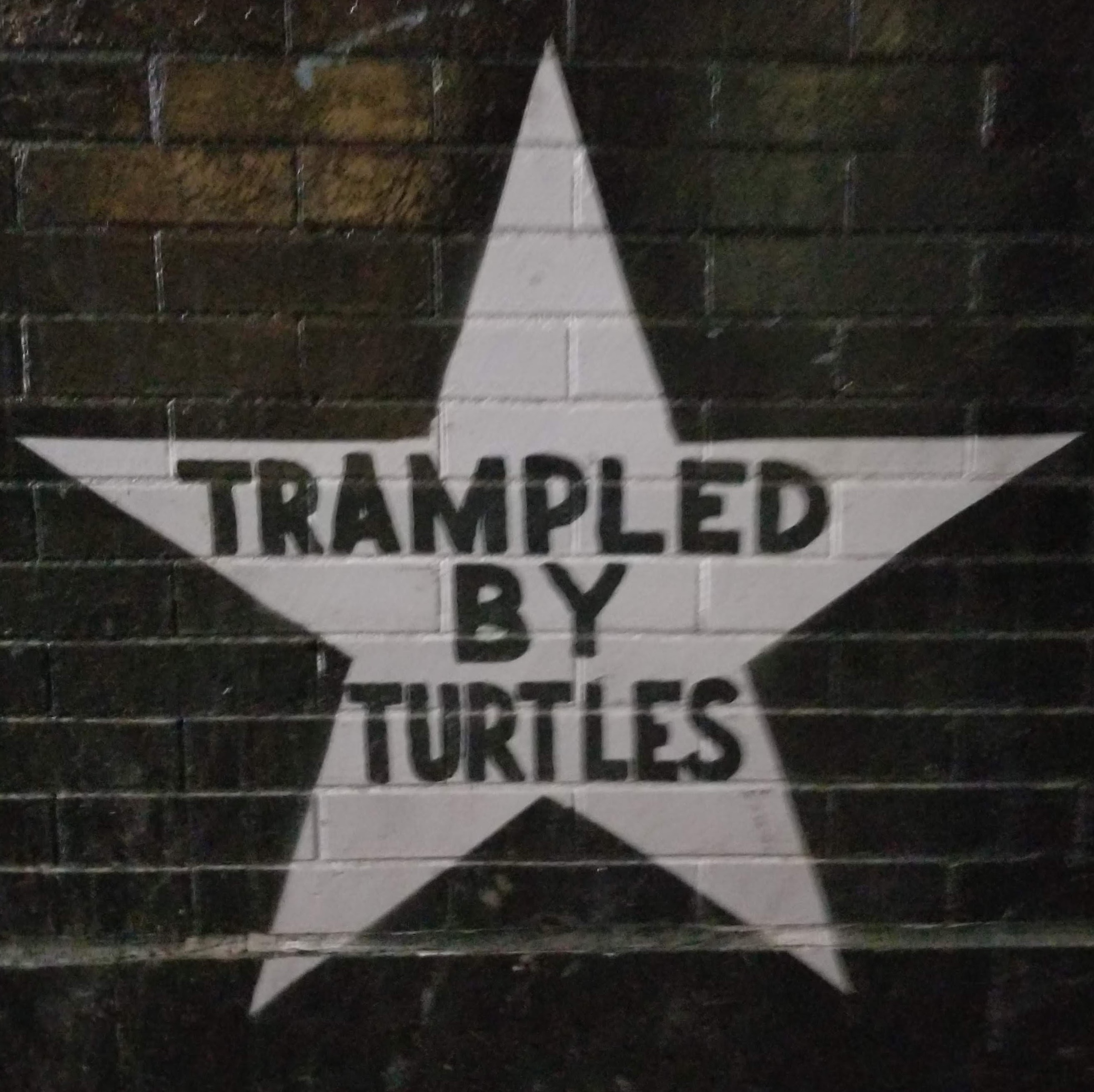
Star honoring the band Trampled by Turtles on the outside mural of First Avenue, a Minneapolis club

The band has been honored with a star on the outside mural of the Minneapolis nightclub First Avenue, recognizing performers that have played sold-out shows or have otherwise demonstrated a major contribution to the culture at the iconic venue. Receiving a star "might be the most prestigious public honor an artist can receive in Minneapolis," according to journalist Steve Marsh.
