= Stuart Davis (musician) =

American musician

- Born: Stuart Davis; January 11, 1971 (age 55)
- Origin: Des Moines, Iowa
- Genres: singer-songwriter, alternative rock
- Occupation: Musician
- Instruments: Vocals, guitar
- Years active: 1992–present
- Website: stuartdavis.com

Stuart Davis (born January 11, 1971) is an American contemporary musician and songwriter. He has been performing throughout the United States and Europe since 1993. Davis regularly works with music producer Alex Gibson, who produced his last five studio albums.

In 2009, TV channel HDNet broadcast the first six-episode season of "Sex, God, Rock 'n Roll", a comedy sketch show written, directed, and hosted by Davis; a second season with Davis and co-host Kandyse McClure began airing in 2012. Davis is a contributing member of philosopher Ken Wilber's Integral Institute, and appears as a fictionalized character in Wilber's novel Boomeritis. His single Already Free (2008) was featured as the end theme of the Showtime series I Can't Believe I'm Still Single, and was also used in the feature film Drillbit Taylor. A precursor to the HDNet series "Sex, God, Rock 'n Roll" existed in the form of a 12-part web series, The Stuart Davis Show (2007), select episodes of which were co-written with Steven Brill.

Ken Wilber has called Davis "the finest singer/songwriter of his generation".

== Early life ==
Stuart Evan Davis was born in Des Moines, Iowa in 1971, the youngest of three brothers. His family moved to Lakeville, Minnesota when he was a young boy, and he was formally introduced to music when his father got him a guitar and taught him three chords. By the time he had graduated high school he'd recorded his first album and was soon playing shows around Minnesota. Early influences include: Elvis Costello, Richard Thompson, XTC, and Bob Dylan.

== Musical career ==
=== 1990s ===
The first two albums in the Stuart Davis catalogue, Idiot Express and Big Energy Dream, are social and romantic critiques featuring simple acoustic guitar progressions and minimal instrumentation characteristic of folk music. His third release, Self-Untitled, received airplay on some alternative and public stations with the songs "Universe Communion" and "Only Changing Drugs".

With his fourth album, Nomen Est Numen, Davis shed his folk roots. The music featured driving bass lines, electric guitars, and richer vocal harmonies characteristic of alternative/pop, and lyrically it was more intellectual and subversive.

Between Nomen Est Numen and his fifth album, Kid Mystic, two important events happened to Davis. First, he was introduced to Zen Buddhism by his drummer Dave King, and became a practitioner of zazen, or sitting meditation. The second was his discovery of the book Sex, Ecology, Spirituality, by Ken Wilber. Their influence would soon send Davis on an entirely new trajectory.

As the title implies, on Kid Mystic Davis begins to explore some ethereal territory. The pace and structure of the songs are much different, and the lyrics are more image-conscious and laced with metaphor. Death and dying play a major role, implicitly or explicitly, on a majority of the tracks, and instead of playing as simply a collection of songs, it is more a unitive work.

The tagline of his subsequent studio album, Bright Apocalypse, is "13 Songs About God", and uses some of the same structural and thematic material. The thirteen songs construct a sort of dialogue with the divine; much of the album is sung in second person, and in several of the songs the divine speaks back in whispers.

=== 2000s ===
His eponymous seventh album, popularly known as the Silver Album or Silver/Naked, for its cover art featuring a nude Davis adorned in silver paint, is built around a trilogy of songs that close the album called "Dive", "Swim", and "Drown". They were inspired by the book Grace and Grit, another work by Ken Wilber, and "tell the story of a soul going back home." The album also contains the song "Ladder", which is featured as the bumper music on Wilber's audio program Kosmic Consciousness.

Beginning in 2003, Davis began working with Alex Gibson, who produced that year's Bell. Gibson was able to procure the services of drummer Abe Laboriel Jr., and Davis's affiliation with Gibson would continue to give him access to some of the most accomplished session musicians in the industry.

Bell was followed by ¿What, a radical sonic departure in the Davis discography, which features performance poetry by Saul Williams on "April Showers, April Tears", beat-boxing on "Easter", house-influenced synth bass lines on "Dirty Purity", dissonant sampled loops on "Voodoo Dolls", and the spare, haiku-like "Glass". ¿What is filled with haunting effects and vocals throughout, and features songs mostly composed of sampled loops and sequenced rhythms. He expressed the wish to make a video with actress Parker Posey for his song "Parker Posey", which tells the story about a condescending director pitching a movie role to Posey that is beneath her ability, so he can break her into the upper echelon of Hollywood A-list actresses.

His next album, Something Simple, leads off with the single "Already Free", which was featured as the end theme of the Showtime series I Can't Believe I’m Still Single, and was also used in the movie Drillbit Taylor. It peaked at 154 on the Billboard singles chart in 2008. Davis worked with a new roster of musicians for this project, including Wendy Melvoin on guitar, Ed Kowalczyk on backing vocals, and Sean Hurley (John Mayer, Pitbull) on bass. Hurley previously contributed on ¿What.

Joe Viglione noted the influence of Al Green and Elvis Costello on Something Simple and wrote that the song "Deity Freak" "is as infectious as it gets." He wrote that Something Simple "demands a number of spins before it reveals itself and some of the mystery still remains, which is the kind of intangible quality usually indicating that something special is going on."

=== 2010s ===
After taking a few years off from music to concentrate on his television and screenwriting projects, Davis went back into the studio with a new band to record Music For Mortals. The album features a collection of songs written over the course of the last year of his father's life, and explores themes found in several "books of the dead." Once again it was produced and engineered by Alex Gibson (David Lee Roth, Sting, Ben Folds), and features musicians Blair Sinta (Alanis Morissette, Annie Lennox) on drums, Joel Shearer (Christina Aguilera, Dido) on guitar, Justin Meldal-Johnsen (Tori Amos, Beck) on bass, and Nathan Jenkins (Beyoncé, Slim Thug) on various instruments, electronic programming, additional production & engineering. The first single from the album is called "Beautiful Place".

== Television career ==
In 2006 Davis created a 12-episode web series for the website Integral Naked called The Stuart Davis Show. It features Stuart and two "clones" that represent competing and divergent voices of his personality. The show deals with subjects such as open marriage, Death Day, The Secret, and the tragedy at Virginia Tech.

After completing a year of The Stuart Davis Show, Davis began developing a new venture called Sex, God, Rock 'n Roll. While his first series was a loosely designed and spiritually influenced topical sitcom, the new show followed a more conventionally formatted late-night talk show with an opening monologue, news segment, and interview, with occasional pre-recorded parody commercials. It was picked up by Mark Cuban's network HDNet for the 2009 television season and ran for 6 episodes. The televised version omitted the interview segments, but these were included as extras on the season's home video release.

For season 2, Davis redesigned the show into five segments including the Sexy Word (with Mariann Gavelo of Casa de mi padre), news (with co-host Kandyse McClure of Battlestar Galactica), musical studio performance, Rocktails (McClure), and closing monologue. One of the high points of season 2 was a sit-down interview with Kermit the Frog. Among other topics the two discussed Kermit's new movie (The Muppets), sex life, and spiritual practice. Season 2 ran for 6 episodes in the winter of 2012 on HDNet.

== Other artistic pursuits ==
=== Constructed language ===
Davis is the developer of a constructed language called Is. Among its unique characteristics are that words are "conjugated in altitudes," or levels of consciousness.

=== Calligraphy ===
Davis paints calligraphy, often using the medium to explore his fascination with crows. One of the most common styles he employs is to paint the crows using tiny strokes composed of his constructed language Is. Because of the microstroke method, these paintings can take a long time to complete. He also typically burns the edges so that they have an uneven and charred perimeter.

=== Books and screenplays ===
Davis also has written several screenplays, one of them with Steven Brill, and published an audiobook called Love Has No Opposite, which he describes, in the introduction, as a tome that "some might consider a Blog-ography...a biography minus sequence, thematic continuity, and facts."

A book with a title similar to his television program, Sex, God, Rock 'n Roll: Sacred Comedy for Profane Sensibilities, remains unpublished but is the source of many of the spoken word segments read by Davis at shows in 2012. A foreword to the book is contributed by philosopher Ken Wilber.

== Personal life ==
Davis has long been an advocate of the probability of extraterrestrial life, in part fostered by his friendship with the late John E. Mack, and his fascination with the subject has manifested in the songs "Universe Communion", "Shades of Grey" and "They’re Already Here". He discussed his esoteric viewpoints as a guest on the late-night radio show Coast to Coast AM in 2012.

He has served as a charter member of Ken Wilber's spiritual think-tank Integral Institute (II), and was a contributor to II's multimedia sister site Integral Naked.

Davis grew up in Minnesota before moving to Boulder, Colorado. Most recently he moved to Amsterdam where he is living in a comfortable house-boat with his wife and two daughters while he focuses on other pursuits such as his writing.

== Works ==
=== Audio ===
- Idiot Express, 1993
- Big Energy Dream, 1994
- Self Untitled, 1995
- Nomen Est Numen, 1996
- Kid Mystic, 1997
- 16 Nudes, 1998 (live album)
- Bright Apocalypse: 13 Songs About God, 1999
- Stuart Davis, 2001
- The Late Stuart Davis, 2002 (live album)
- Bell, 2003
- ¿What, 2006
- Love Has No Opposite, audiobook, 2006
- Something Simple, 2008
- Sex, God, Rock n' Roll: Songs from the TV Series, 2009 compilation
- Music For Mortals, 2012
- Songbook of the Dead, 2014
- Temple Whore, 2019

=== Video ===
- Between the Music: Volume One and Volume Two, 2006
- The Stuart Davis Show (web series), 2006–2007
- Seven Voices Presents: Stuart Davis Live on the Immersive No. 7 Soundstage, 2008
- Sex, God, Rock 'n Roll, 2009–2012
- Just Be Yourself [short film], 2010

=== Writings ===
Radical Spirit, 2002
