= Stuart Davis (album) =

Studio album by Stuart Davis
- Released: 2001
- Length: 47:25
- Label: Dharma Pop
- Producer: Alex Oana

Stuart Davis chronology
Bright Apocalypse (1999)	Stuart Davis (2001)	The Late Stuart Davis (2002)

Stuart Davis is the ninth studio album released by Stuart Davis.

== Track listing ==
1. "Surfaces"
2. "Babies"
3. "Rock Stars And Models"
4. "Dresden"
5. "Fault Lines"
6. "Invincible"
7. "Savoring Samsara"
8. "Doppelganger Body Donor"
9. "Immanence
10. "Ladder"
11. "Dive"
12. "Swim"
13. "Drown"
