= Dan Wilson (musician) =

American musician (born 1961)

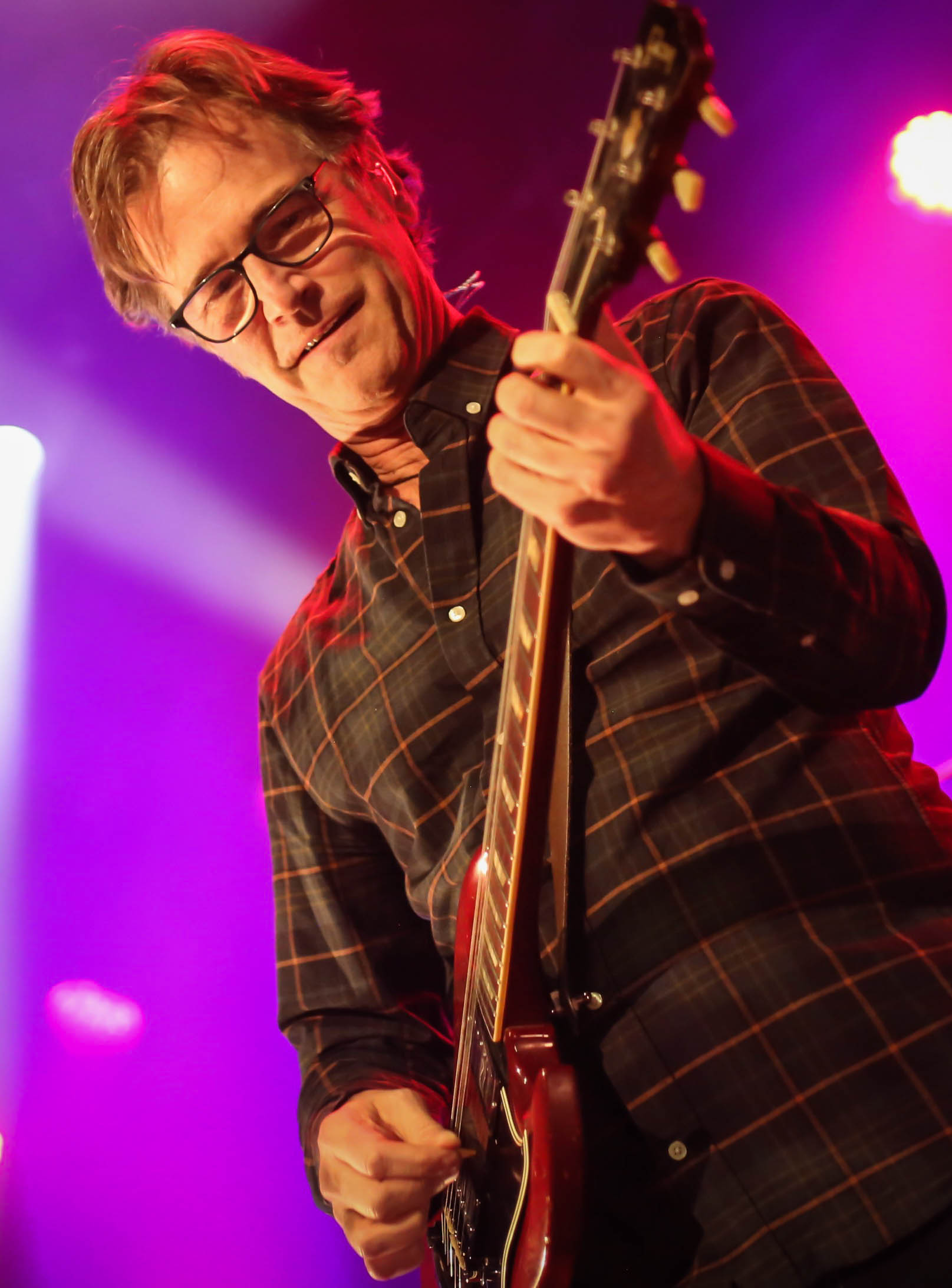
- Wilson performing with Semisonic in 2017

Background information
- Born: Daniel Dodd Wilson; May 20, 1961 (age 65); St. Louis Park, Minnesota, U.S.
- Genres: Alternative rock; pop rock; post-grunge; power pop; folk rock; country
- Occupations: Musician; singer; songwriter; record producer; visual artist
- Instruments: Vocals; guitar; bass; keyboards; drums; percussion
- Labels: Ballroom Music, Pleasuresonic Recordings
- Member of: Semisonic
- Formerly of: Trip Shakespeare
- Website: danwilsonmusic.com

Daniel Dodd Wilson (born May 20, 1961) is an American musician, singer, songwriter, visual artist, and record producer. He gained recognition in the late 1990s with his band, Semisonic, and their single, "Closing Time." Wilson is a 7x Grammy nominee and 4x Grammy winner for his work as a co-writer and record producer. He received nominations for Best Rock Song, Album of the Year, and Song of the Year with Semisonic's "Closing Time" (1999), Taylor Swift's Red (2014), and Jon Batiste's "Butterfly" (2024) respectively. Wilson won Grammy awards for Song Of The Year with The Chicks' "Not Ready to Make Nice" (2007), Album Of The Year with Adele's 21 (2012), Best Country Song with Chris Stapleton's "White Horse" (2024), and Best Song Written For Visual Media with Jon Batiste's "It Never Went Away" (2025).

Referred to as the "songwriter's songwriter," Wilson has written with a broad range of songwriters across genres. His other collaborators include Laufey, Weezer, Suki Waterhouse, Noah Kahan, Keith Urban, Pink, Mitski, Leon Bridges, Nas, Panic! at the Disco, My Morning Jacket, John Legend, Brandy Clark, Preservation Hall Jazz Band, and many others.

In addition to his Grammy nominations and awards, Wilson has received accolades from across the industry. In 2024, Wilson won the CMA Award for Song of the Year with Chris Stapleton's “White Horse.” Later that year, “It Never Went Away,” which he co-wrote with Batiste for the documentary American Symphony, received an Academy Award nomination for Best Original Song. He also received nominations from the Academy of Country Music for Song of the Year for Dierks Bentley's "Home" (2012) and Album of the Year for Taylor Swift's "Red" (2012). In 2021, Wilson produced the re-recorded version of Taylor Swift's "Treacherous” for the album Red (Taylor's Version).

Besides fronting Semisonic, co-writing, and producing records, Wilson has released several solo recordings, including Re-Covered (2017), a cover album of some of his previously co-written songs. He was also a member of the Minneapolis based, psychedelic pop-rock band Trip Shakespeare.

== Early life and education ==
Wilson is a native of St. Louis Park, Minnesota. Wilson attended Harvard University, where he studied visual arts with a focus on printmaking and from which he graduated B.A. summa cum laude in Visual and Environmental Studies in 1983, while he resided in Dunster House. Wilson is an accomplished artist, and won the first Louis Sudler Prize for Outstanding Artistic Talent and Achievement in 1983. While in college, he began collaborating with his brother, singer-songwriter Matt Wilson, who also attended Harvard College. The Wilson brothers played in two bands, Animal Dance and the Love Monsters. After college, Wilson pursued his interest in drawing and painting, first in San Francisco and then in Minneapolis.

== Career ==
=== Early career ===
In 1987, Wilson joined the Minneapolis band Trip Shakespeare, which his brother Matt Wilson had founded with bassist John Munson and drummer Elaine Harris. The original three members had already released one record, Applehead Man, and now as a quartet, with Wilson on guitar, piano, sharing lead vocal duties with Matt Wilson—with whom Wilson also co-wrote many of the songs—and Munson, the band released three more albums (Are You Shakespearienced?, 1988, Gark Records; Across the Universe, 1990, A&M Records; Lulu, 1991, A&M Records) and one EP (Volt, 1992, Twin Tone).

Since Trip Shakespeare's breakup in 1992, Wilson has continued to collaborate with his brother, including the release of two live albums (Minneapolis 2010 and Minneapolis 2013).

=== With Semisonic ===
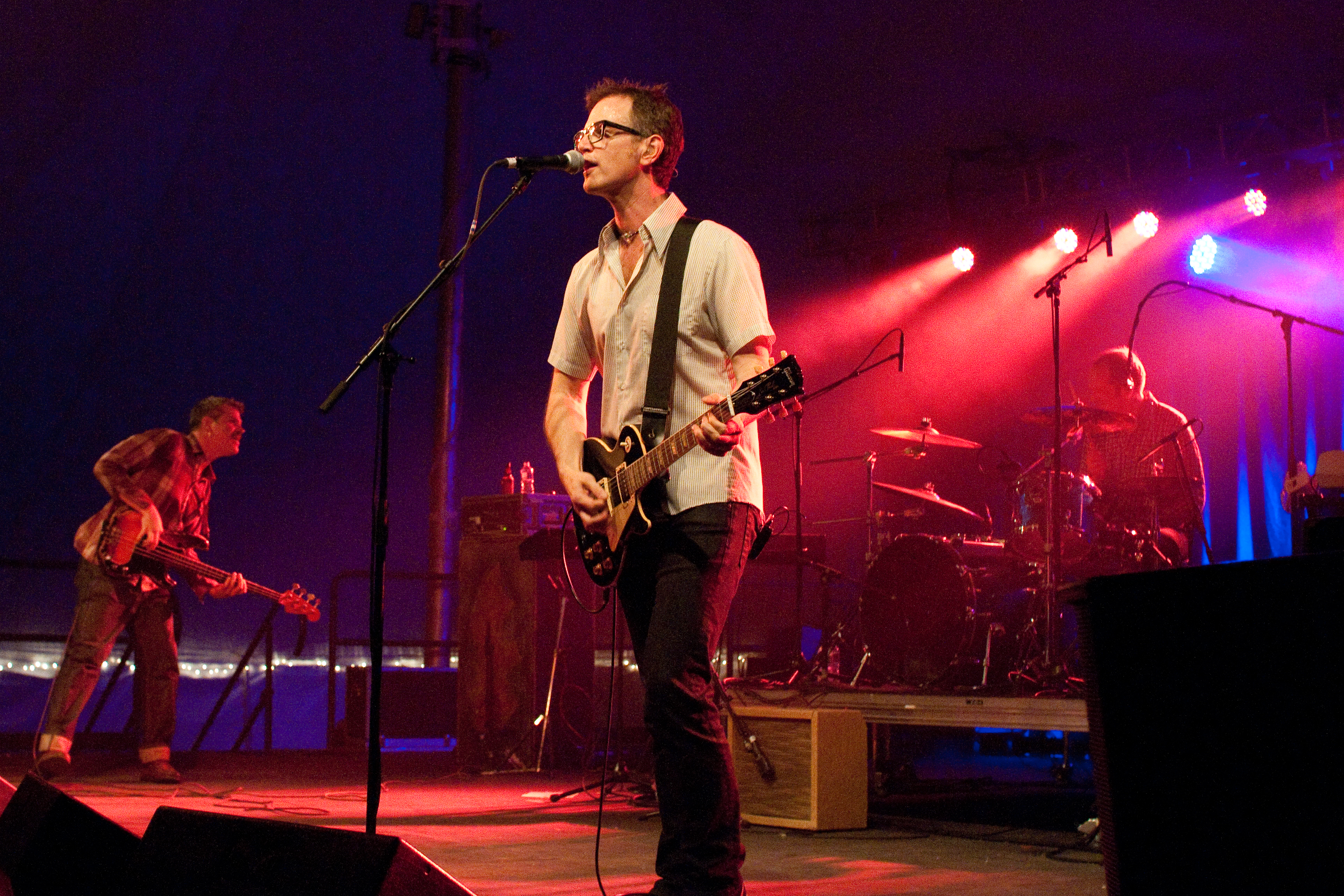
Wilson with Semisonic

After Trip Shakespeare's breakup in 1992, Wilson and Munson joined with drummer Jacob Slichter to form Pleasure, a trio that was later renamed Semisonic. Semisonic released one EP, three full-length albums, and one live album.

The band's first album, Great Divide, received critical acclaim. David Fricke wrote in a year-end Rolling Stone article on the notable albums of 1996, "Great Divide is that rare '96 beast, a record of simple but sparkling modern pop, rattling with power-trio vitality." It was their 1998 release, Feeling Strangely Fine, however, that brought the band to widespread national and then international attention and success. Powered by Wilson's songs "Closing Time", which was a number-one hit on the Modern Rock charts for thirteen weeks in the spring and summer of 1998, the follow-up single "Singing in My Sleep", and "Secret Smile", a breakthrough hit for the band internationally, Feeling Strangely Fine attained platinum sales status in the U.S. and U.K. "Closing Time" received a 1999 Grammy nomination for Best Rock Song and has become an enduring pop-culture reference point for the late 1990s. It was a focal point of the plot and soundtrack of the 2011 film Friends with Benefits.

Semisonic's third album, All About Chemistry, was released in 2001, and featured Wilson's song "Chemistry", the album's first single, and also included "One True Love", a song Wilson co-wrote with Carole King.

Semisonic stopped touring in August 2001 but continued to perform on occasion. Slichter's memoir, So You Wanna Be a Rock & Roll Star, provides a detailed account of the band's adventures and misadventures in the music business.

On June 26, 2020, Semisonic released their first single in nearly 20 years, "You're Not Alone," followed by an EP of the same name on September 18, 2020.

=== As a solo artist ===
==== Free Life ====
Wilson's solo debut, Free Life, was released in 2007 by American Recordings. Produced with Rick Rubin, Free Life was recorded in Minneapolis and Los Angeles and includes performances by Tracy Bonham, Sheryl Crow, Jason Lader, Gary Louris, Natalie Maines, Benmont Tench, and a number of Minneapolis-based musicians including multi-instrumentalist and frequent Semisonic sideman Ken Chastain, Eric Fawcett, John Hermanson, Joanna James, Mason Jennings, Steve Rhoem, Joe Savage, as well as Wilson's Semisonic bandmates Munson and Slichter.

Free Life helped establish Wilson's reputation as a songwriter, with The A.V. Club writing, "the star of the show here is Wilson's remarkable instinct for creating gorgeous songs, and his unabashed, obvious joy in doing so. For anyone worried that songcraft is an endangered species, Free Life should ease those fears."

The song Breathless became a big hit in Greece (and other Balkan countries) and Dan Wilson performed it at the 2009 MAD Video Music Awards.

==== Love Without Fear ====
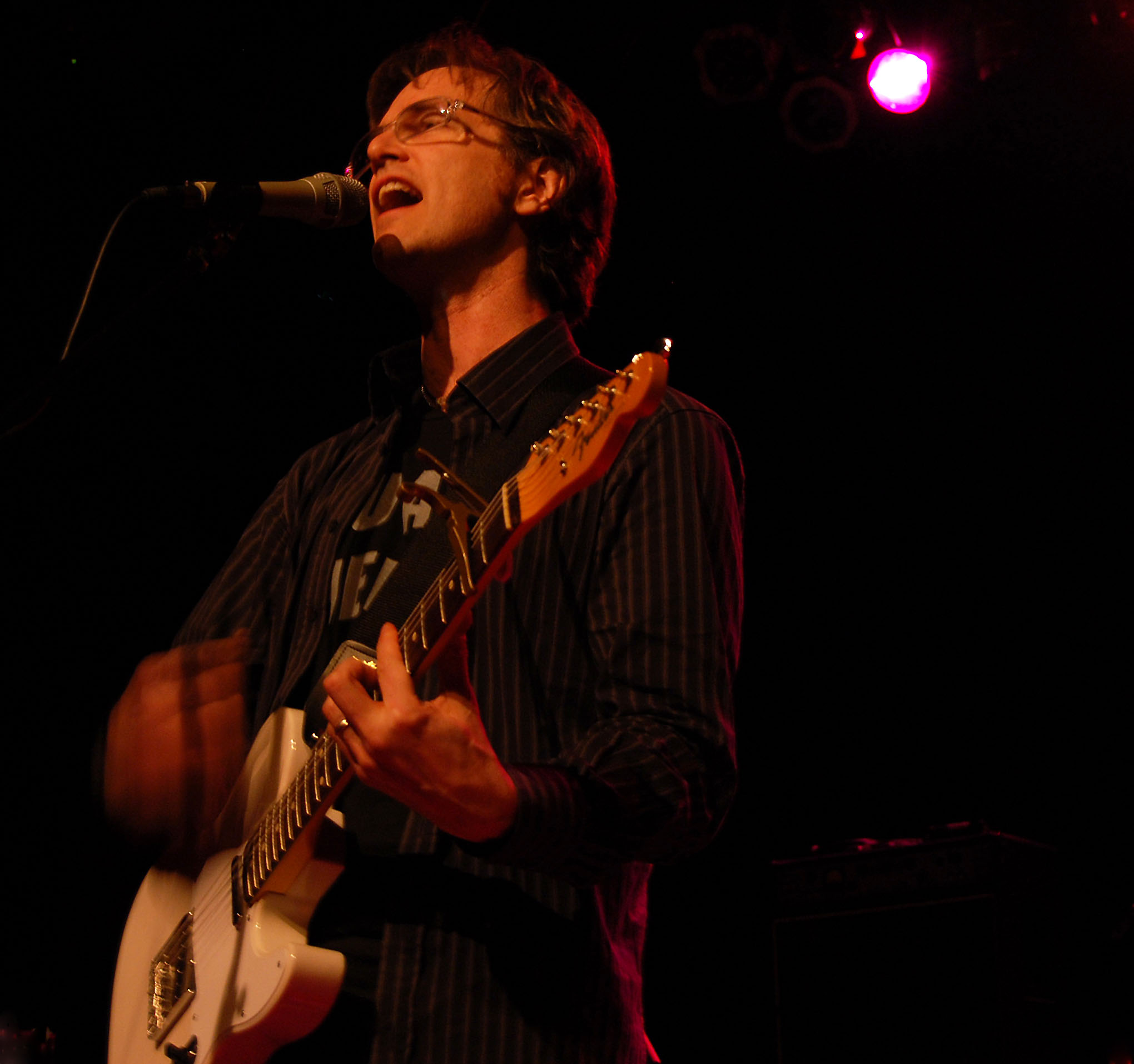
Wilson performing in 2008

Wilson's second solo album, Love Without Fear, was released on April 15, 2014 and includes performances by Sara Bareilles, Missy Higgins, Lissie, Natalie Maines, Blake Mills, Sara Watkins, and Sean Watkins. The first recording from Love Without Fear, "Disappearing" (with a cover of Neil Young's "Out on the Weekend" included as a b-side) was released on November 7, 2013 and was the debut release of the new singles label, Canvasclub.

In describing the album, Wilson said, "The songs are about being left alone, not wanting to lose someone, about desperately wishing for connection and togetherness. The sound of the record lives at the intersection of Americana and Beatles- influenced rock and roll. A little bit of twang and a lot of cinematic emotion." The album received largely favourable reviews emphasizing Wilson's reputation as a songwriter. "Dan Wilson's career is proof positive that smart, elegant songwriting has a place in music... [Love Without Fear] is a lovely amalgamation of chamber rock, gentle country, gooey '70s pop and snappy soul."

==== Re-Covered ====
Wilson's third solo studio album, Re-Covered, was released on August 4, 2017. The album is a collection of reinterpretations of songs Wilson wrote for other artists, both big hits and "songs that I always wished were big hits, but weren't." The album includes "Someone Like You" (written with Adele), "Not Ready To Make Nice" (written with Dixie Chicks), "Home" (written with Dierks Bentley and Brett Beavers), and "When The Stars Come Out" (written with Chris Stapleton).

==== Singles ====
In September 2018 Wilson announced that he would begin releasing new music that Fall. Rather than organizing the new songs into an album, he would instead release them over time as monthly singles. According to Wilson, "I fell in love with the idea of just letting songs out into the world when they happen." "I don't have anything against making an album. If I do 15 or 20 of these I would love the idea of packaging them together and calling it an album. I think that'd be fantastic, but I don't really have that in my mind. I'm just trying to be free."

==== Words and Music by Dan Wilson ====
Wilson's discoveries as a solo artist and collaborator with other artists are the subject of "Words and Music by Dan Wilson", solo concerts in which he performs some of his songs and describes the songs' various inspirations or the insights that occasioned their composition. "Words and Music by Dan Wilson" has come to Hotel Cafe, Room 5 and Largo in Los Angeles, Joe's Pub and City Winery in New York, World Cafe Live in Philadelphia, Jammin' Java in DC, Rams Head in Annapolis, The Cedar Cultural Center in Minneapolis, the Fitzgerald Theater in Saint Paul, Schubas Tavern in Chicago, Berklee College of Music's Red Room at Cafe 939 in Boston, and the Red Barn concert series in Northfield, MN. Wilson has also presented Words & Music workshops at the 2012 ASCAP expo, UCLA's Herb Alpert School of Music, and USC's Thornton School of Music.

Wilson's thoughts about songwriting and the creative process are also captured in his series, Words & Music in Six Seconds, which was originally launched on Vine and is now regularly posted on Instagram, Twitter, and Facebook. From American Songwriter, "In his short videos, Wilson provides insightful quips about common songwriting insecurities, methodology, personal writing quirks, and various other tips for writing your best." In November 2020, he released the Words + Music in 6 Seconds deck, a collection of cards written and designed by Wilson based on his Instagram series.

=== As a songwriter and producer ===
As a songwriter and producer, Wilson has collaborated with a number of artists. Two of these collaborations have earned him Grammy Awards.

A number of artists have described Wilson's ability to help put their feelings and ideas into song. Speaking of her experience of working with him, Pink said, in an online interview, "He is brilliant, and he's a thoughtful songwriter. And he's a song crafter . . . like old-school. He crafts songs and he thinks about them. And I learned a lot from working with him." In describing her co-writing with Wilson, Adele said, "Dan had me on my hands and knees, crying my eyes out - there's just something about him that made me completely open up as a composer."

==== Taking the Long Way – The Dixie Chicks ====
Wilson co-wrote six of the songs on the Dixie Chicks multiple-Grammy-winning album Taking the Long Way, including the title song and "Not Ready to Make Nice", which earned Wilson and the Dixie Chicks the 2007 Grammy for Song of the Year. In the 2006 film Dixie Chicks: Shut Up and Sing, Wilson speaks on camera about his experience as a co-writer on this album, especially in regard to helping the Dixie Chicks make an artistic response to their rejection by radio and a large swath of their fans in the wake of the band's statements about President Bush and the Iraq War.

One of the songs he co-wrote for this album, "Easy Silence", appears on Free Life, with Dixie Chicks singer Natalie Maines singing harmonies.

==== 21 – Adele ====
Wilson co-wrote three of the songs on Adele's multiple-Grammy-winning 21, "Don't You Remember", "One and Only", and, most notably, "Someone Like You", which became a number one hit in the US, UK, Ireland, Australia, and New Zealand was a top ten hit around the globe. As a producer of this track, on which he also played piano, Wilson shared in the 2012 Grammy Award for Album of the Year.

In an interview with American Songwriter, Wilson recounted the writing and recording of "Someone Like You":

The recording on the album was intended as a demo. I was thinking, "Oh, they're going to make a big version of this, strings and angelic choirs, like a big Chrissie Hynde power-ballad." But by the end of the first day, the demo was sounding lovely, and very affecting, but it was only half-written, there were no words on the second verse or the bridge as I remember. Adele came to the studio the next day and said, "I played it for my manager and me Mum." I was a little nervous about this because I don't like people to hear works-in-progress. I asked her what they thought of the song. "My manager loves it and me Mum cried."

"Someone Like You" won the 2012 Grammy for Best Pop Solo Performance, and as she accepted the award, Adele said, "I want to thank Dan Wilson, who wrote this song with me. My life changed when I wrote this song and I felt it before anyone even heard it."

In April 2013, "Someone Like You" became the most downloaded single of all time in the UK, and in 2015 was voted the UK's third favourite UK number one single of the last 60 years.

=== As a visual artist ===
Wilson's career as a painter, illustrator, and calligrapher is less widely known, but his artwork has often intersected with his music career. He was represented by Thomas Barry Fine Arts in Minneapolis, and his works are included in numerous private and corporate collections.

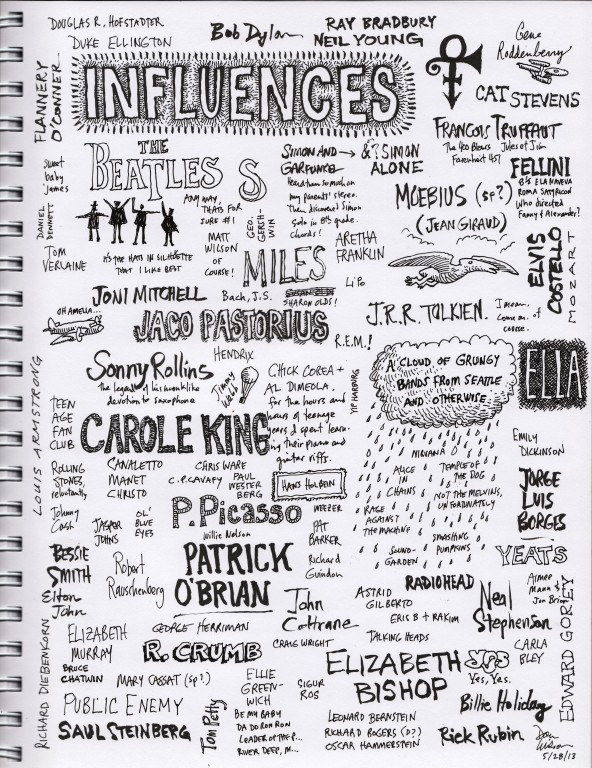
Illustrated Influences

Wilson's paintings are featured on the artwork for two of Trip Shakespeare's albums, Are You Shakespearienced? and Lulu, as well as on the cover of his first solo album, Free Life.

Wilson created all of the artwork for his 2014 album Love Without Fear. Most notably, a hand illustrated 24-page hardcover Deluxe Album Book/CD. The package includes Wilson's own calligraphy, sketches, and handwritten lyrics for each song on the album. The official lyric videos for his singles from the album, "Disappearing" and "A Song Can Be About Anything" are also made entirely from his own illustrations.

At his "Words and Music by Dan Wilson" shows, audience members receive illuminated set lists that are hand illustrated by Wilson. One of these set lists was featured on NPR's blog All Songs Considered.

Wilson's calligraphy and illustrations are featured in his Tumblr series, "DW's Sketchbook" and his musical cartoons have been featured in The Wall Street Journal's Speakeasy Blog.

== Personal life ==
Wilson is married to Diane Espaldon. Wilson and his wife were contemporaries at Harvard University, where he studied visual arts and she studied government. Wilson's wife subsequently earned a M.A. from School of International and Public Affairs, Columbia University. Together, they have one biological daughter, Corazon ("Coco") (b. 1997), who was born prematurely and has disabilities and for whom "Closing Time" was written before her birth, and Lily (b. 2007), who was adopted at age two from the Philippines.

== Discography ==
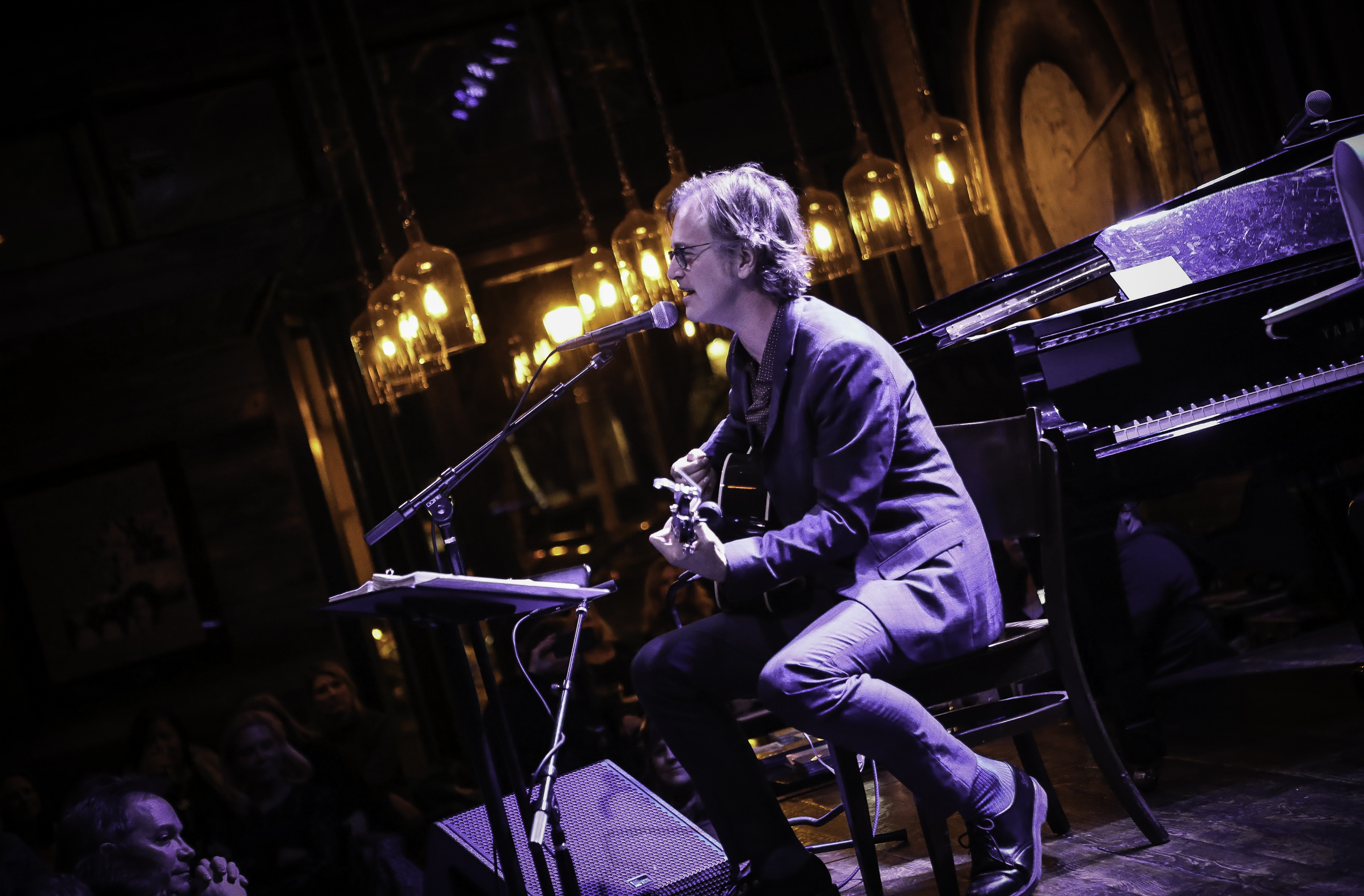
Wilson in 2019

=== Singles ===
- 2025 "ventura"
- 2025 "laurel"
- 2025 "good night, deervale, moorpark, tujunga"
- 2022 "Dancing On The Moon"
- 2022 "On The Floor" - Perfume Genius cover
- 2021 "Under The Circumstances"
- 2020 "Try Love"
- 2020 "The Real Question"
- 2020 "Red Light"
- 2020 "Superfan"
- 2020 "Eventually"
- 2019 "Last December"
- 2019 "Sunshine"
- 2019 "Too Much ii"
- 2019 "A Modest Proposal"
- 2019 "The Rules"
- 2019 "Fly Safe"
- 2018 "Are You Lonely Tonight, Mrs. Claus?"
- 2018 "Christmassy"
- 2018 "Uncanny Valley"
- 2018 "We Ain't Telling"
- 2017 "What a Year for a New Year"
- 2016 "Yoko"
- 2015 "The Hottest Christmas Eve Ever"
- 2014 "Love Without Fear"
- 2014 "A Song Can Be About Anything"
- 2013 "Disappearing"
- 2011 "Soft Picasso"
- 2009 "Breathless"
- 2007 "Cry"

=== Studio albums ===
- 2025 good night, los angeles
- 2022 Dancing On The Moon EP
- 2017 Re-Covered
- 2014 Love Without Fear
- 2008 Be Free EP digital release
- 2007 Free Life

=== Live albums ===
- 2009 Dan Wilson Live at the Pantages – A 2-CD document of Dan Wilson's concert at Minneapolis' Pantages Theater on December 13, 2008.
- 2008 Live at the Electric Fetus
- 2001 DW Live @ the CCC
- 1998 Dan Wilson Live @ Bryant Lake Bowl

=== with Semisonic ===
- 2026 Don't Give Up Yet (Single)
- 2023 Little Bit of Sun (LP)
- 2023 "Little Bit of Sun","Grow Your Own", "The Rope", & "Out of the Dirt" (singles)
- 2020 You're Not Alone (EP)
- 2018 Feeling Strangely Fine (20th Anniversary Reissue)
- 2003 One Night at First Avenue (live)
- 2001 All About Chemistry
- 1998 Feeling Strangely Fine
- 1996 Great Divide
- 1995 Pleasure EP (EP)
- 1993 Pleasure

=== Dan and Matt Wilson ===
- 2013 Dan & Matt Wilson Minneapolis 2013
- 2010 Dan & Matt Wilson Minneapolis 2010

=== Trip Shakespeare ===
- 1992 Volt (EP)
- 1991 Lulu
- 1990 Across the Universe
- 1989 Are You Shakespearienced?
- 1986 Applehead Man

=== The Love Monsters ===
- 1983 Kiss Away The Tears (7")

=== Film and TV soundtracks (as a performer) ===
- 2019 Big Little Lies Season 2 Soundtrack – "That Was Yesterday" (Leon Bridges)
- 2010 Dear John Soundtrack – "You Take My Troubles Away" (with Rachael Yamagata)
- 2009 All About Steve Soundtrack – "Sugar"
- 2001 Summer Catch – Semisonic's "Over My Head"
- 1999 American Pie Soundtrack – "Good Morning Baby"
- 1999 Together in Concert: Live, Bic Runga Featuring Dan Wilson
- 1999 Friends Again – Semisonic's "Delicious"
- 1999 10 Things I Hate About You – Semisonic's "FNT"
- 1999 Never Been Kissed Soundtrack – Semisonic's "Never You Mind"
- 1999 For the Love of the Game Soundtrack – Semisonic's "For the Love of the Game"
- 1996 The Long Kiss Goodnight Soundtrack – Semisonic's "FNT"

=== Film soundtracks (as a writer and producer) ===
- 2023 American Symphony – "It Never Went Away" (Jon Batiste)
- 2023 Love Again – "Love Again" (Celine Dion)
- 2014 The Fault In Our Stars – "Tee Shirt" and "Best Shot" (Birdy)
- 2013 Spark: A Burning Man Story – "We Ride" (Missy Higgins)
- 2013 Safe Haven – "We Both Know" (Colbie Caillat & Gavin DeGraw)
- 2010 The Twilight Saga: Eclipse – "Ours" (The Bravery)
- 2010 The Kid – "Boy" (KT Tunstall)

=== Compilations ===
- 2013 Absolutely Cuckoo: Minnesota Covers the 69 Love Songs – "The Things We Did and Didn't Do"
- 2011 Minnesota Remembers Vic Chesnutt – "Soft Picasso"
- 2006 For New Orleans – "I Can't Hold You"
- 2002 For the Kids – "Willie the King"
- 2002 Maybe This Christmas – "What a Year for a New Year"

=== Writing and producing credits ===
Year	Artist	Credit	Title
2026	Alec Benjamin	Writer	"Without My Strings"
2026	Lost Frequencies & Gryffin	Writer	"Wait All Night" (ft. Michael Marcagi)
2026	David Kushner	Writer	"Cycle of Life"
2026	Evan Bartels	Writer	"Nothing From Nowhere"
2026	Forrest Nolan	Writer	"Sweet Thing"
2026	Shawn Mendes	Writer	"Cold In California"
2026	Orville Peck	Writer	"Too Little, Too Late"
2026	Semisonic	Producer/Writer	"Don't Give Up Yet"
2026	Ruel	Producer/Writer	"Talking To The Driver"
2026	Sierra Spirit	Producer/Writer	"Rodeo Clown"
2026	Sierra Spirit	Producer/Writer	"Can't Be Friends"
2026	Sierra Spirit	Producer/Writer	"Walls"
2026	Sierra Spirit	Producer/Writer	"Devil's Tower"
2026	August Ponthier	Writer	"Everywhere Isn't Texas"
2026	Michael Marcagi	Writer	"Anna Lee"
2025	Ruel	Producer/Writer	"Wild Guess"
2025	Ruel	Producer/Writer	"Even Angels Won't"
2025	Ruel	Writer	"Destroyer"
2025	Benny G	Writer	"An Hour or So"
2025	Florence Road	Producer	"Storm Warnings"
2025	Hohnen Ford	Producer/Writer	"Tomorrow's Tomorrow"
2025	Sierra Spirit	Producer/Writer	"Lift A Finger"
2025	Fujii Kaze	Writer	"Casket Girl"
2025	Florence Road	Producer/Writer	"Hand Me Downs"
2025	Kathleen Edwards	Writer	"Billionaire"
2025	Jessie Murph	Writer	"Ain't But A Thing"
2025	Michael Marcagi	Writer	"Humbling"
2025	Joe Jonas	Writer	"You Got The Right"
2025	Ben Goldsmith	Producer/Writer	"More Than I Got"
2025	Ax and the Hatchetmen	Writer	"Stay // Honestly"
2024	Michael Marcagi	Writer	"Keep Me Honest"
2024	Elmiene	Producer/Writer	"The Deported"
2024	Elmiene	Producer/Writer	"Promise Me A Rose"
2024	Phantogram	Writer	"Running Through Colors"
2024	Phantogram	Writer	"Feedback Invisible"
2024	James Bay	Writer	"Some People"
2024	Bastille	Writer	"Leonard & Marianne"
2024	Ben Goldsmith	Writer	"Easy"
2024	Phantogram	Writer	"Come Alive"
2024	Phantogram	Writer	"Happy Again"
2024	Phantogram	Writer	"All A Mystery"
2024	Laufey	Producer/Writer	"Trouble"
2024	Meklit	Producer/Writer	"Antidote"
2024	Meklit	Producer/Writer	"Ethio Blue"
2024	Meklit	Producer/Writer	"Digging for Love"
2024	Meklit	Producer/Writer	"Hagere Ethiopia"
2024	Meklit	Producer/Writer	"Here to Imagine"
2024	Meklit	Producer/Writer	"Birdsong"
2024	Jon Batiste	Producer/Writer	"It Never Went Away"
2023	Jon Batiste	Producer/Writer	"Butterfly"
2023	Daniel Seavey	Writer	"Fall into You"
2023	Chris Stapleton	Writer	"White Horse"
2023	Claud	Producer/Writer	"A Good Thing"
2023	Laufey	Producer/Writer	"Promise"
2023	Celine Dion	Producer/Writer	"Love Again"
2023	Ricky Montgomery	Writer	"Eraser"
2023	Ricky Montgomery	Writer	"Truth or Dare"
2023	Ricky Montgomery	Writer	"In Your Pocket"
2023	Milck	Writer	"Metamorphosis"
2023	Manchester Orchestra	Writer	"Lose You Again"
2023	Meet Me at the Altar	Writer	"T.M.I."
2023	Joy Oladokun	Producer/Writer	"Changes"
2022	Meghan Trainor	Writer	"Superwoman"
2022	Hrishikesh Hirway	Producer	"Still Dreaming"
2022	Noah Cyrus	Writer	"Unfinished"
2022	Nina Nesbitt	Producer/Writer	"Colours of You"
2022	Cuco	Producer/Writer	"Sweet Dissociation"
2022	Madison Cunningham	Writer	"In From Japan"
2022	Christina Perri	Writer	"Fever"
2022	Vance Joy	Producer/Writer	"This One"
2022	August Ponthier	Producer/Writer	"Late Bloomer"
2022	John Mark Nelson	Writer	"Don't Look Back"
2022	Tenille Townes	Producer/Writer	"The Sound Of Being Alone"
2022	Alec Benjamin	Writer	"Shadow Of Mine"
2022	Alec Benjamin	Writer	"Speakers"
2022	Alec Benjamin	Writer	"Deniro"
2022	Chastity Brown	Writer	"Wonderment"
2021	Leon Bridges	Writer	"Summer Rain"
2021	Taylor Swift	Producer/Writer	"Treacherous (Taylor's Version)"
2021	Taylor Swift	Producer/Writer	"Come Back...Be Here (Taylor's Version)"
2021	Mitski	Writer	"The Only Heartbreaker"
2021	Ricky Montgomery	Writer	"Sorry For Me"
2021	Joshua Speers	Producer/Writer	"The Handoff"
2021	Joshua Speers	Producer/Writer	"Don't Stop Loving Me" feat. SKAAR
2021	Tom Morello	Writer	"Driving To Texas" feat. Phantogram
2021	Joshua Speers	Producer	"Thirteen"
2021	August Ponthier	Producer/Writer	"Tornado Country"
2021	Joshua Speers	Writer	"Just Kids"
2021	Tom Morello	Writer	"Mary Celeste"
2021	Leon Bridges	Writer	"Motorbike"
2021	Amy Shark	Producer/Writer	"You'll Never Meet Anyone Like Me Again"
2021	Teddy Geiger	Writer	"Love Somebody"
2021	Priscilla Ahn	Writer	"Waiting"
2020	Andrea Russett	Writer	"Darkest Hour"
2020	LANY	Writer	"Nobody Else"
2020	Joshua Speers	Writer	"Thunder Blanket"
2020	JoJo	Writer	"In Your Room"
2020	Briston Maroney	Writer	"Deep Sea Diver"
2020	Ricky Reed	Writer	"Better" feat. Leon Bridges and Kiana Ledé
2020	Amy Allen	Producer/Writer	"Queen of Silver Linings"
2020	The Chicks	Writer	"March March"
2020	Leon Bridges	Writer	"Sweeter"
2020	Alec Benjamin	Writer	"Six Feet Apart"
2020	Phantogram	Writer	"Glowing"
2020	Phantogram	Writer	"Gaunt Kids"
2020	Phantogram	Writer	"Love Me Now"
2020	Gunnar Gehl	Writer	"For Your Love"
2019	Yoshi Flower	Writer	"More"
2019	Celine Dion	Producer/Writer	"Lovers Never Die"
2019	Harper Finn	Writer	"Good for Me"
2019	JoJo	Writer	"Sabotage" feat. Chika
2019	Mondo Cozmo	Writer	"Come On"
2019	Donna Missal	Writer	"You Burned Me"
2019	Leon Bridges	Producer/Writer	"That Was Yesterday"
2019	Noah Kahan	Writer	"Busyhead"
2019	James Bay	Producer/Writer	"Bad" - single
2019	Rhye	Producer/Writer	"Needed" - single
2019	Mike Posner	Writer	"Song About You" - lead single
2019	Mike Posner	Writer	"Move On" - single
2018	Alec Benjamin	Writer	"Water Fountain"
2018	Alec Benjamin	Writer	"Gotta Be a Reason"
2018	John Legend	Writer	"Waiting for Christmas"
2018	Lukas Graham	Writer	"You're Not the Only One (Redemption Song)"
2018	Josh Groban	Writer	"You Have No Idea"
2018	Steve Perry	Writer	"No More Cryin'"
2018	Jason Mraz	Producer/Writer	"Love Is Still the Answer"
2018	Brett Dennen	Producer/Writer	"Here's Looking at You Kid" - single
2018	Brett Dennen	Producer/Writer	"Be Somebody"
2018	Brett Dennen	Producer/Writer	"People I Love"
2018	Brett Dennen	Producer/Writer	"Live in the Moment"
2018	Brett Dennen	Producer/Writer	"Baker's Globe Mallow"
2018	Ben Rector	Writer	"Sometimes"
2018	Missy Higgins	Producer/Writer	"How Was I to Know"
2018	LeAnn Rimes & Stevie Nicks	Writer	"Borrowed"
2018	Leon Bridges	Writer	"Shy"
2018	Phantogram	Writer	"Someday" - single
2018	Jeremy Messersmith	Writer	"Once You Get to Know Us"
2018	Brett Dennen	Producer	"Already Gone" - single
2018	Brett Dennen	Producer/Writer	"Let's..."
2018	Brett Dennen	Producer/Writer	"Home Away from Home"
2018	Brett Dennen	Producer/Writer	"Good Vibration"
2018	Brett Dennen	Producer/Writer	"Jenny and Jill"
2018	Vance Joy	Writer	"Like Gold"
2018	Vance Joy	Writer	"We're Going Home" - single
2017	Meg Mac	Writer	"Brooklyn Apartment (It's Louder Than the TV and the Radio)"
2017	Bishop Briggs	Producer/Writer	"Dream" - lead single
2017	Niall Horan	Writer	"Since We're Alone"
2017	Noah Cyrus	Producer/Writer	"Almost Famous"
2017	Chase & Status	Writer	"Crawling"
2017	Halsey	Writer	"Alone"
2017	Preservation Hall Jazz Band	Writer	"One Hundred Fires"
2017	Cold War Kids	Writer	"Free to Breathe"
2017	K. Flay	Writer	"Black Wave"
2017	Meklit	Producer/Writer	"Memories of the Future" (ft. Preservation Hall Horns)
2017	Meklit	Producer/Writer	"This Was Made Here"
2017	Meklit	Producer	"I Want to Sing for Them All" (ft. Andrew Bird)
2017	Meklit	Producer	"Supernova"
2017	Meklit	Producer	"You Are My Luck" (ft. Preservation Hall Horns)
2017	Meklit	Producer	"Yerakeh Yeresal" (ft. Andrew Bird)
2017	Meklit	Producer	"You Got Me" (ft. Preservation Hall Horns)
2017	Meklit	Producer	"Yesterday Is a Tizita"
2017	Meklit	Producer	"Human Animal"
2017	Meklit	Producer	"Sweet or Salty"
2017	Meklit	Producer	"Birthday Song" (ft. Preservation Hall Horns)
2017	Aquilo	Writer	"Almost Over"
2016	Sean Watkins	Writer	"Keep Your Promises II"
2016	Brooke Fraser	Writer	"Let's Be Human"
2016	Phantogram	Writer / Co-producer	"You Don't Get Me High Anymore" - lead single
2016	Phantogram	Writer / Co-producer	"Same Old Blues" - single
2016	Phantogram	Writer / Additional production	"You're Mine"
2016	Phantogram	Writer / Additional production	"Cruel World"
2016	Phantogram	Writer	"Funeral Pyre"
2016	Phantogram	Writer	"Answer"
2016	Phantogram	Writer	"Run Run Blood"
2016	Phantogram	Writer	"Destroyer"
2016	Phantogram	Writer	"Calling All"
2016	The Head and the Heart	Writer	"Turn It Around"
2016	Dierks Bentley	Writer	"Why Do I Feel"
2016	Sara Watkins	Writer	"Say So"
2016	Sara Watkins	Writer	"Like New Year's Day"
2016	The Twilight Hours	Writer	"Anymore"
2016	The Twilight Hours	Writer	"Help Me Find the Way"
2016	Weezer	Writer	"California Kids"
2016	Andrew Bird	Writer	"Are You Serious"
2016	Rita Wilson	Producer/Writer	"Crying, Crying"
2016	Brian Fallon	Writer	"Steve McQueen"
2016	Nada Surf	Writer	"Rushing"
2016	Nada Surf	Writer	"Victory's Yours"
2016	Foxes	Producer/Writer	"Devil Side"
2016	Panic! at the Disco	Writer	"Emperor's New Clothes"
2016	Anthony Wilson	Writer	"Your Footprints"
2015	Florence + The Machine	Producer/Writer	"Conductor"
2015	Harry Connick, Jr.	Writer	"You Have No Idea"
2015	D.A. Wallach	Writer	"Feel"
2015	Phases	Writer	"Spark"
2015	Chris Stapleton	Writer	"When the Stars Come Out"
2015	My Morning Jacket	Writer	"Big Decisions"
2015	Rae Morris	Writer	"Unguarded"
2014	Brooke Fraser	Writer	"Magical Machine"
2014	Spoon	Writer	"New York Kiss"
2014	Alex Clare	Producer/Writer	"Three Hearts"
2014	Birdy	Producer/Writer	"Tee Shirt"
2014	Birdy	Producer/Writer	"Best Shot"
2014	The Secret Sisters	Writer	"Iuka"
2013	Gin Wigmore	Writer	"If Only"
2013	James Blunt	Producer/Writer	"Next Time I'm Seventeen"
2013	LeAnn Rimes	Writer	"I Do Now"
2013	Romeo Testa	Writer	"With You"
2013	Romeo Testa	Writer	"I'm So Down"
2013	Birdy	Producer/Writer	"All You Never Say"
2013	Birdy	Writer / Additional production	"Maybe"
2013	Birdy	Writer	"All About You"
2013	John Legend	Writer	"You & I (Nobody in the World)"
2013	Preservation Hall Jazz Band	Writer	"I Think I Love You"
2013	Preservation Hall Jazz Band	Writer	"Rattlin' Bones"
2013	LeAnn Rimes	Writer	"Borrowed"
2013	Natalie Maines	Writer	"Free Life"
2013	Missy Higgins	Producer	"We Ride"
2013	Colbie Caillat & Gavin Degraw	Producer	"We Both Know"
2012	Cory Chisel and The Wandering Sons	Writer	"Never Meant to Love You"
2012	Jack Carty	Writer	"The Length of Canada"
2012	The Webb Sisters	Writer	"Missing Person"
2012	Taylor Swift	Co-Producer/Writer	"Treacherous"
2012	Taylor Swift	Co-Producer/Writer	"Come Back...Be Here"
2012	Pink	Producer/Writer	"The Great Escape"
2012	Nas	Producer/Writer	"Roses"
2012	Sara Watkins	Writer	"When It Pleases You"
2012	Elizaveta	Writer	"Goodbye Song"
2012	Audra Mae	Writer	"My Friend the Devil"
2012	Missy Higgins	Writer	"Everyone's Waiting"
2012	Missy Higgins	Writer	"Set Me on Fire"
2012	Paloma Faith	Writer	"When You're Gone"
2012	Dierks Bentley	Writer	"Home"
2012	Gin Wigmore	Writer	"Poison"
2012	Gin Wigmore	Writer	"Roll It All"
2011	Mike Viola	Writer	"Get You Back"
2011	Adele	Producer/Writer	"Someone Like You" - single
2011	Adele	Writer	"One and Only"
2011	Adele	Writer	"Don't You Remember"
2011	James Morrison	Writer	"The Awakening"
2011	James Morrison	Writer	"In My Dreams"
2011	Mike Doughty	Writer	"Na Na Nothing"
2011	Mike Doughty	Writer	"Holiday (What Do You Want)"
2011	The Downtown Fiction	Writer	"Hurt Me So Good"
2011	Nicole Atkins	Writer	"Heavy Boots"
2011	Gabe Dixon	Writer	"My Favorite"
2010	Josh Groban	Writer	"Hidden Away"
2010	Josh Groban	Writer	"Higher Window" - single
2010	Josh Groban	Writer	"Bells of NYC"
2010	Josh Groban	Writer	"War at Home"
2010	Josh Groban	Writer	"If I Walk Away" - single
2010	Josh Groban	Writer	"Love Only Knows"
2010	Keith Urban	Writer	"Big Promises"
2010	Weezer	Writer	"Ruling Me"
2010	Griffin House	Producer/Writer / Mixing	"If You Want"
2010	Griffin House	Writer	"Coming Down the Road"
2010	The Bravery	Producer/Writer	"Ours"
2010	KT Tunstall	Producer/Writer	"Boy"
2010	Storyhill	Producer / Mixing engineer	"Avalon"
2010	Storyhill	Producer / Mixing engineer	"Better Angels"
2010	Storyhill	Producer / Mixing engineer	"Well of Sorrow"
2010	Storyhill	Producer / Mixing engineer	"Caught in a Mess"
2010	Storyhill	Producer / Mixing engineer	"Cover Your Tracks"
2010	Storyhill	Producer / Mixing engineer	"World Go Round"
2010	Storyhill	Producer / Mixing engineer	"Getaway"
2010	Storyhill	Producer / Mixing engineer	"A Town Talks"
2010	Storyhill	Producer / Mixing engineer	"Dangerous Weapon"
2010	Storyhill	Producer / Mixing engineer	"Pieces of Love"
2010	Rachael Yamagata	Producer/Writer / Mixing	"You Take My Troubles Away"
2009	Gin Wigmore	Writer	"Hey Ho"
2009	James Morrison	Writer	"Once When I Was Little"
2009	Bic Runga	Writer	"Change of Heart"
2009	Parachute	Writer	"Blame It on Me"
2009	Ballas Hough Band	Writer	"Turnin' Me On"
2009	Ballas Hough Band	Writer	"She Was the One"
2008	Jason Mraz	Writer	"Details in the Fabric"
2008	Absentstar	Writer	"For the Moment"
2008	Absentstar	Writer	"If You Like It"
2008	Absentstar	Writer	"Life Support"
2008	Anberlin	Writer	"Retrace"
2008	Carrie Rodriguez	Writer	"She Ain't Me"
2008	Mike Doughty	Producer	"Fort Hood"
2008	Mike Doughty	Producer	"I Just Want the Girl in the Blue Dress to Keep On Dancing"
2008	Mike Doughty	Producer	"Put It Down"
2008	Mike Doughty	Producer	"More Bacon Than the Pan Can Handle"
2008	Mike Doughty	Producer	"27 Jennifers"
2008	Mike Doughty	Producer	"I Wrote a Song About Your Car"
2008	Mike Doughty	Producer	"I Got the Drop on You"
2008	Mike Doughty	Producer	"Wednesday (Contra la Puerta)"
2008	Mike Doughty	Producer	"Like a Luminous Girl"
2008	Mike Doughty	Producer	"Nectarine (Part One)"
2008	Mike Doughty	Producer	"Navigating by the Stars at Night"
2008	Jeremy Messersmith	Producer / Recording and mixing engineer	"The Silver City"
2008	Jeremy Messersmith	Producer / Recording and mixing engineer	"Welcome to Suburbia"
2008	Jeremy Messersmith	Producer / Recording and mixing engineer	"Dead End Job"
2008	Jeremy Messersmith	Producer / Recording and mixing engineer	"Franklin Avenue"
2008	Jeremy Messersmith	Producer / Recording and mixing engineer	"The Commuter"
2008	Jeremy Messersmith	Producer / Recording and mixing engineer	"Miracles"
2008	Jeremy Messersmith	Producer / Recording and mixing engineer	"Love You to Pieces"
2008	Jeremy Messersmith	Producer / Recording and mixing engineer	"Breaking Down"
2008	Jeremy Messersmith	Producer / Recording and mixing engineer	"Skyway"
2008	Jeremy Messersmith	Producer / Recording and mixing engineer	"Virginia"
2008	Jeremy Messersmith	Producer / Recording and mixing engineer	"Light Rail"
2008	The New Standards	Producer / Mixing engineer	"Rock and Roll"
2008	The New Standards	Producer / Mixing engineer	"Hey Ya"
2008	The New Standards	Producer / Mixing engineer	"Such Great Heights"
2008	The New Standards	Producer / Mixing engineer	"Watching the Detectives"
2008	The New Standards	Producer / Mixing engineer	"Androgynous"
2008	The New Standards	Producer / Mixing engineer	"Bring It On Home to Me"
2008	The New Standards	Producer / Mixing engineer	"London Calling"
2008	The New Standards	Producer / Mixing engineer	"Toxic"
2008	The New Standards	Producer / Mixing engineer	"Maps"
2008	The New Standards	Producer / Mixing engineer	"Is That All There Is?"
2008	The Gabe Dixon Band	Writer	"All Will Be Well"
2008	The Gabe Dixon Band	Writer	"Find My Way"
2008	The Gabe Dixon Band	Writer	"Five More Hours"
2007	Dixie Chicks	Writer	"Not Ready to Make Nice" - single
2007	Dixie Chicks	Writer	"Easy Silence"
2007	Dixie Chicks	Writer	"Taking the Long Way"
2007	Dixie Chicks	Writer	"Lullaby"
2007	Dixie Chicks	Writer	"Voice Inside My Head"
2007	Dixie Chicks	Writer	"So Hard"
2007	Storyhill	Producer/Writer / Recording and mixing engineer	"For a Song"
2007	Storyhill	Producer/Writer / Recording and mixing engineer	"Happy Man"
2007	Storyhill	Producer/Writer / Recording and mixing engineer	"Love Will Find You"
2007	Storyhill	Producer/Writer / Recording and mixing engineer	"Sacramento"
2007	Storyhill	Producer/Writer / Recording and mixing engineer	"Paradise Lost"
2007	Storyhill	Producer / Recording and mixing engineer	"Give Up the Ghost"
2007	Storyhill	Producer / Recording and mixing engineer	"Ballad of Joe Snowboard"
2007	Storyhill	Producer / Recording and mixing engineer	"Highlight"
2007	Storyhill	Producer / Recording and mixing engineer	"Blazing Out of Sight
2007	Storyhill	Producer / Recording and mixing engineer	"Fallen"
2007	Storyhill	Producer / Recording and mixing engineer	"Room in My Heart"
2007	James Morrison	Writer	"Movin' On"
2007	Aly & AJ	Writer	"If I Could Have You Back"
2007	Brooke Fraser	Writer	"Thief"
2007	Absent Star	Producer	"Half Life"
2007	Absent Star	Producer	"For God Sakes"
2007	Absent Star	Producer	"Don't Lock Me Out"
2007	Absent Star	Producer	"Life Support"
2007	Absent Star	Producer	"A Year from Now"
2007	Absent Star	Producer	"Everyone You Know"
2007	Absent Star	Producer	"Give In to Me"
2007	Absent Star	Producer	"If What You Mean Is Harm"
2007	Absent Star	Producer	"Quietly Conceited"
2007	Absent Star	Producer	"If You Like It"
2007	Absent Star	Producer	"For the Moment"
2007	Absent Star	Producer	"All Is Forgotten"
2006	Sean Watkins	Writer	"I'm Sorry"
2006	Sean Watkins	Writer	"Runaway Girl"
2006	Eliot Morris	Producer/Writer	"Balancing the World"
2006	Lucie Silvas	Writer	"Passionate You"
2006	Shaye	Writer	"I Can't Say"
2005	Jason Mraz	Writer	"Did You Get My Message"
2005	Jason Mraz	Writer	"Song for a Friend"
2005	Mike Doughty	Producer/Writer / Recording and mixing engineer	"Busting Up a Starbucks"
2005	Mike Doughty	Producer/Writer / Recording and mixing engineer	"American Car"
2005	Mike Doughty	Producer/Writer / Recording and mixing engineer	"Your Misfortune"
2005	Mike Doughty	Producer/Writer / Recording and mixing engineer	"I Hear the Bells"
2005	Mike Doughty	Producer/Writer / Recording and mixing engineer	"Tremendous Brunettes"
2005	Mike Doughty	Producer / Recording and mixing engineer	
2005	Mike Doughty	Producer / Recording and mixing engineer	"Unsingable Name"
2005	Mike Doughty	Producer / Recording and mixing engineer	"Madeline and Nine"
2005	Mike Doughty	Producer / Recording and mixing engineer	"White Lexus"
2005	Mike Doughty	Producer / Recording and mixing engineer	"Sunken-Eyed Girl"
2005	Mike Doughty	Producer / Recording and mixing engineer	"Grey Ghost"
2005	Mike Doughty	Producer / Recording and mixing engineer	"His Truth Is Marching On"
2005	Glen Phillips	Writer	"True"
2005	Glen Phillips	Writer	"Clear Eyed"
2005	Glen Phillips	Writer	"Released"
2005	Hope Partlow	Writer	"Let Me Try"
2005	The New Standards	Producer / Recording and mixing engineer	"The Inchworm"
2005	The New Standards	Producer / Recording and mixing engineer	"The New Pollution"
2005	The New Standards	Producer / Recording and mixing engineer	"I Will Dare"
2005	The New Standards	Producer / Recording and mixing engineer	"All the Young Dudes"
2005	The New Standards	Producer / Recording and mixing engineer	"Man, Oh Man"
2005	The New Standards	Producer / Recording and mixing engineer	"Nature Boy"
2005	The New Standards	Producer / Recording and mixing engineer	"Only Love Can Break Your Heart"
2005	The New Standards	Producer / Recording and mixing engineer	"Town Crier"
2005	The New Standards	Producer / Recording and mixing engineer	"Love Is the Law"
2005	The New Standards	Producer / Recording and mixing engineer	"Oh Yeah"
2005	The New Standards	Producer / Recording and mixing engineer	"Dark End of the Street"
2005	The New Standards	Producer / Recording and mixing engineer	"My Ship"
2005	The New Standards	Producer / Recording and mixing engineer	"Song 2"
2005	The New Standards	Producer / Recording and mixing engineer	"September Song"
2004	Rachael Yamagata	Writer	"I Want You"
2004	Graham Colton	Writer	"Don't Give Up on Me"
2003	Bleu	Writer	"Somethin's Gotta Give"
2003	Epic Hero	Producer / Recording and mixing engineer	"Hello Hello"
2003	Epic Hero	Producer / Recording and mixing engineer	"Tear Her Down"
2003	Epic Hero	Producer / Recording and mixing engineer	"New Life"
2003	Epic Hero	Producer / Recording and mixing engineer	"Stay Awake"
2003	Epic Hero	Producer / Recording and mixing engineer	"End of the Line"
2003	Epic Hero	Producer / Recording and mixing engineer	"High School"
2003	Epic Hero	Producer / Recording and mixing engineer	"One in a Crowd"
2003	Epic Hero	Producer / Recording and mixing engineer	"Angel"
2003	Epic Hero	Producer / Recording and mixing engineer	"On My Own"
2003	Epic Hero	Producer / Recording and mixing engineer	"Something Someone Someday"
2003	Epic Hero	Producer / Recording and mixing engineer	"One Fine Day"
2003	Epic Hero	Producer / Recording and mixing engineer	"Ease Your Mind"
2000	Evan and Jaron	Writer	"Ready or Not"
1999	Bic Runga	Producer/Writer	"Good Morning Baby"
