= Little Bit of Sun =

Studio album by Semisonic
- Released: November 3, 2023
- Studios: Minneapolis, Minnesota, United States
- Genres: Pop rock; power pop
- Length: 39:58
- Label: Pleasuresonic
- Producer: Dan Wilson

Semisonic chronology
You're Not Alone (2020)	Little Bit of Sun (2023)

"My approach as an artist has always been to write from where I am now. It's been two decades since Semisonic made a full record together, so it was interesting to write from the perspective of returning to the band and finding it inspiring but very different. I couldn't help but think about the early days, about the formative influences that shaped and inspired us, but a lot of the songs are about the present moment in my life."

— Dan Wilson on making the first Semisonic full-length album in over two decades

Little Bit of Sun is the fourth full-length studio album by American alternative rock band Semisonic, released on November 3, 2023 through Pleasuresonic Recordings. It is the band's first full-length album in 22 years since All About Chemistry, and was preceded by four singles: the title track, "Grow Your Own", "The Rope", and "Out of the Dirt". It has received positive reviews from critics.

== Recording and release ==
Semisonic stopped recording together after almost a decade of touring and recording, leading frontman Dan Wilson to collaborate as a songwriter and producer with a variety of musicians for the next two decades. The band briefly attempted to record around 2010, but the sessions were abandoned. This full-length follows a 2020 EP that Semisonic released and includes themes of long-term friendship, nostalgia, and an exploration of the perspective and wisdom that can come from aging. The songs additionally explore a variety of moods and sentiments, but leaning toward hopefulness and optimism. Wilson ended up writing just over 30 songs and recorded 15 to 18 for this album.

== Reception ==
In Glide Magazine, John Moore stated that this release has "everything longtime followers have loved about the band, smart, relatable lyrics with big choruses, sharp hooks, and sunny melodies, blending together influences like Big Star, The Beatles, and The Connells". Ethan Beck of Paste rated this album a 5.9 out of 10, stating that the band struggled to capture the charm of their earlier career, stating that they sound too self-serious and calling out "The Rope" as the only highlight of the release. Writing for Under the Radar, Frank Valish rated this album 7.5 out of 10, calling it "the next enticing chapter" of the band's career, made up of "top notch melodic pop/rock" that the band previously recorded.

== Track listing ==
1. "Little Bit of Sun" (Amy Allen, Dan Wilson) – 2:33
2. "The Rope" (Allen, Yves Rothman, and Wilson) – 2:30
3. "Grow Your Own" (Wilson) – 3:34
4. "Don't Fade Away" (Wilson) – 2:29
5. "Keep Me in Motion" (Jacob Slichter and Wilson) – 3:44
6. "All the Time" (Allen, Rothman, and Wilson) – 4:11
7. "If You Say So" (John Munson and Wilson) – 3:19
8. "Out of the Dirt" (Lori McKenna and Wilson) – 3:21
9. "It Wasn't Like We Hoped It Would Be" (Wilson) – 3:20
10. "So Amazed" (Wilson) – 2:35
11. "Only Empathy" (McKenna and Wilson) – 3:31
12. "Beautiful Sky" (Jim James and Wilson) – 4:58

The above track listing is from the compact disc edition; music download and streaming editions swap tracks 5 and 6.

== Personnel ==
Semisonic

- John Munson – bass guitar, lead vocals on "If You Say So"
- Jacob Slichter – drums
- Dan Wilson – guitar, vocals, celesta on "If You Say So", production

Additional personnel

- Jason Isbell – lead guitar on "Out of the Dirt"
- Jim James – vocals on "Beautiful Sky"

== See also ==
- 2023 in American music
- List of 2023 albums
