= You're Not Alone (Semisonic EP) =

EP by Semisonic
- Released: September 18, 2020
- Genre: Alternative rock
- Length: 15:42
- Label: Pleasuresonic Recordings
- Producer: Dan Wilson

Semisonic chronology
| All About Chemistry (2001) | You're Not Alone (2020) | Little Bit of Sun (2023) |

You're Not Alone is an EP by rock band Semisonic. Released on September 18, 2020, it is the band's first collection of new material in 19 years following their hiatus after touring 2001's All About Chemistry. The EP was preceded by the release of its title track on June 26, 2020.

== Background ==
Though largely inactive since 2001, Semisonic never broke up and over the years would still get together to play occasional shows that usually took place in their hometown of Minneapolis. However, despite lead singer and main songwriter Dan Wilson's successful career as a songwriter and producer for the likes of Dixie Chicks and Adele and as a solo artist, he found it difficult to write new material that sounded like Semisonic.

It was when he met Liam Gallagher in 2017 with the prospect of writing songs for the former Oasis and Beady Eye singer that Wilson found inspiration for Semisonic again. Though ultimately he and Gallagher did not work together, Wilson felt that the songs he set out to write for Gallagher were more suitable for Semisonic instead. Over the next two years, Wilson and his bandmates John Munson and Jacob Slichter would record the new material during a couple of sessions at his house in Los Angeles.

In July 2019, Semisonic gave live debuts to the new songs "You’re Not Alone", "Basement Tapes" and "All It Would Take" at two shows they played in Milwaukee and Minneapolis. In between those two dates, the band also recorded the songs in a live session for Minnesota Public Radio's The Current. By the end of the year, Semisonic had finished mixing their new EP.

== Singles ==
The EP's first single was its title track. Released on June 26, 2020, “You’re Not Alone” reached #14 on the AAA charts. Star Tribune music critic Chris Riemenschneider called it “as radio-ready as 'Closing Time,' the kind of hook-filled pop confection at which Wilson excels, with a stirring, consoling message for the current rocky times.”

Follow-up single “Basement Tapes” was released to radio on September 18, 2020, the same day as the EP release. Riemenschneider called it “a blazingly catchy and colorful rocker that could be about the nascent days of any rock band.”

== Critical reception ==
Rolling Stone's review declared You're Not Alone “returns to the trio’s blend of winsome melodies, power-chord guitars and largely angst-free lyrics.” In the Minneapolis Star Tribune, music critic Chris Riemenschneider wrote, “The collection sounds as timeless musically as it does right-on-time lyrically. . . Twenty-two years after releasing “Closing Time,” Semisonic — like its trademark song — has endured and maybe even grown in stature.”

On NPR’s New Music Friday, critic Ann Powers hailed the release. “The wonderful indie band is back with their first music in nineteen years.”

Gwen Ihnat of The A.V. Club called out the release as one of five the outlet loved for the week with the songwriting and vocal performances. “It seems that lightning can indeed strike twice, even after almost 20 years.”

== Track listing ==
You're Not Alone track listing
| No. | Title | Writer(s) | Length |
|---|---|---|---|
| 1. | "You’re Not Alone" | Dan Wilson | 3:20 |
| 2. | "All It Would Take" | Wilson | 2:58 |
| 3. | "Basement Tapes" | Wilson; Jenny Owen Youngs; Mike Viola | 3:33 |
| 4. | "Don’t Make Up Your Mind" | Wilson; Youngs; Viola | 2:53 |
| 5. | "Lightning" | Wilson; Richard Walters | 2:58 |
