= Free Life (album) =

Studio album by Dan Wilson
- Released: 2007
- Genre: Alternative rock
- Length: 55:50
- Label: American Recordings
- Producer: Dan Wilson

Dan Wilson chronology
DW Live @ The CCC (2001)	Free Life (2007)	Live at the Electric Fetus (2008)

Free Life is the solo debut album by Dan Wilson, the frontman of the rock band Semisonic. It was released on October 16, 2007 by American Recordings. Produced with Rick Rubin, Free Life was recorded in Minneapolis and Los Angeles and includes performances by Tracy Bonham, Sheryl Crow, Jason Lader, Gary Louris, Natalie Maines, Benmont Tench, Jonny Polonsky, and a number of Minneapolis-based musicians including multi-instrumentalist and frequent Semisonic sideman Ken Chastain, Eric Fawcett, John Hermanson, Joanna James, Mason Jennings, Steve Rhoem, Joe Savage, as well as Wilson's Semisonic bandmates John Munson and Jacob Slichter.

Free Life helped establish Wilson's reputation as a songwriter, with The A.V. Club writing, "the star of the show here is Wilson's remarkable instinct for creating gorgeous songs, and his unabashed, obvious joy in doing so. For anyone worried that songcraft is an endangered species, Free Life should ease those fears."

== Track listing ==
1. "All Kinds" – 4:05
2. "Free Life" – 4:54
3. "Breathless" – 3:53
4. "Baby Doll" – 3:58
5. "Come Home Angel" – 5:19
6. "Sugar" – 4:21
7. "Cry" – 4:39
8. "Golden Girl" – 3:54
9. "Against History" – 4:27
10. "Honey Please" – 4:07
11. "She Can't Help Me Now" – 3:16
12. "Hand on My Heart" – 4:23
13. "Easy Silence" – 4:14
