= Pleasure (EP) =

Pleasure EP

EP by Semisonic
- Released: 1995
- Genre: Alternative rock
- Length: 27:37
- Label: CherryDisc
- Producer: Semisonic

Semisonic chronology
Pleasure EP (1995)	Great Divide (1996)

Professional ratings
Review scores
Source	Rating
AllMusic	3/5 stars
The Rolling Stone Album Guide	3/5 stars

Pleasure EP is the first release by rock band Semisonic. It was originally released in 1995 and later re-released following the success of their song "Closing Time". The title refers to the band's original name, Pleasure.

== Track listing ==
1. "The Prize" – 3:54
2. "Brand New Baby" – 3:31
3. "In the Veins" – 3:48
4. "Wishing Well" – 4:40
5. "Star" – 3:43
6. "Sculpture Garden" – 2:49
7. "Drum Lesson" – 0:20
8. "The Gift" – 2:37
9. "We Should Listen" – 0:09
10. "Blank" – 0:09
11. "Broth/Twister Clock" – 0:17
12. "Baby Loop/Forest Skulls" – 0:22
13. "Pure Milk Genius" – 0:04
14. "Moaner/Star Filter" – 0:24

== Personnel ==
=== Semisonic ===
- John Munson – bass guitar
- Jacob Slichter – drums
- Dan Wilson – lead vocals, guitar, design

=== Technical personnel ===
- Daniel Corrigan – photography
- Dan Hersch – mastering
- Brad Kern – engineering, mixing
