= Great Divide (Semisonic album) =

Studio album by Semisonic
- Released: April 9, 1996
- Recorded: July 1995
- Genre: Alternative rock; post-grunge; power pop; indie rock; progressive pop
- Length: 45:39
- Label: MCA
- Producer: Paul Fox

Semisonic chronology
Pleasure EP (1995)	Great Divide (1996)	Feeling Strangely Fine (1998)

Singles from Great Divide
- 1. "Down in Flames" Released: 1996; 2. "F.N.T." Released: 1996; 3. "Delicious" Released: 1996; 4. "If I Run" Released: 1996

Professional ratings
Review scores
Source	Rating
AllMusic	4/5 stars
Entertainment Weekly	B+
MusicHound Rock: The Essential Album Guide	4/5 stars
Rolling Stone	(favorable)
The Rolling Stone Album Guide	4/5 stars

Great Divide is the debut studio album by American rock band Semisonic. It was released April 9, 1996, by MCA Records. It was produced by Paul Fox, and was recorded and mixed by Ed Thacker.

== History ==
Semisonic had signed a record contract with Elektra Records to record the Great Divide album. During recording, Bob Krasnow, the president of Elektra Records had quit, and in the changeover to a new president, the label dropped Semisonic. The band then signed with MCA Records, and finished recording the album. "F.N.T." was featured in the 1999 film 10 Things I Hate About You.

== Track listing ==
All tracks written by Dan Wilson unless otherwise noted.

No.	Title	Writer(s)	Length
1.	"F.N.T. (Fascinating New Thing)"	Wilson, Jacob Slichter	3:29
2.	"If I Run"	Wilson, Slichter	4:16
3.	"Delicious"		3:57
4.	"Down in Flames"		4:02
5.	"Across the Great Divide"		3:00
6.	"Temptation"	Wilson, Slichter	3:38
7.	"The Prize"		3:58
8.	"No One Else"		3:30
9.	"Brand New Baby"	Wilson, John Munson	3:37
10.	"Falling"		3:37
11.	"In Another Life"		4:07
12.	"I'll Feel for You"		4:24

== Personnel ==
Semisonic

- John Munson – bass guitar, backing vocals, lead vocals on "In Another Life"
- Jacob Slichter – drums, keyboards, backing vocals
- Dan Wilson – lead vocals, guitars

Technical personnel

- Paul Fox – production, organ on "Across the Great Divide", additional bass on "Falling", Orchestron on "In Another Life"
- Ed Thacker – mixing
- Stephen Marcussen – mastering
