= All About Chemistry =

Studio album by Semisonic
- Released: March 13, 2001
- Studios: Seedy Underbelly Studio, Minneapolis, Minnesota
- Genres: Alternative rock; power pop; pop rock; blue-eyed soul
- Length: 51:41
- Label: MCA
- Producers: Semisonic; Dan Wilson

Semisonic chronology
Feeling Strangely Fine (1998)	All About Chemistry (2001)	You're Not Alone (2020)

Singles from All About Chemistry
- 1. "Chemistry" Released: January 8, 2001; 2. "Get a Grip" Released: 2001

Professional ratings
Aggregate scores
Source	Rating
Metacritic	69/100
Review scores
Source	Rating
Allmusic	4/5 stars
The A.V. Club	Positive
Chicago Tribune	Average
Dotmusic	2.5/5 stars
Entertainment Weekly	A−
NME	3/10
Q	5/5 stars
Rolling Stone	3.5/5 stars
Spin	5/10
Wall of Sound	60/100

All About Chemistry is the third studio album by American rock band Semisonic, released on March 13, 2001, through MCA Records. With this release, the band failed, at least in America, to capitalize on the momentum it had generated with the song "Closing Time" from their previous album, Feeling Strangely Fine. This had a softer edge than Feeling Strangely Fine and was not as popular with the fans. By 2002, the album had sold 58,000 copies, and its poor sales partially led to the band going on an unofficial hiatus. However, it has a five star rating by Q Magazine. The track "Chemistry" was featured on the soundtrack for 40 Days and 40 Nights.

The song "One True Love" was co-written by the band's singer/guitarist, Dan Wilson and music legend Carole King. The song "Get a Grip" is an ode to masturbation. The title track was included on the album "Nolee Mix" which was released to promote the My Scene dolls.

The special edition of the album features cover art with orange (or pink in the UK) fluid in the vials instead of the blue fluid of the original. It includes two bonus tracks, "Girlfriend" and "Ordinary Life"; instead of being tacked onto the end, they appear between "Get a Grip" and "Surprise."

== Critical reception ==
Q listed All About Chemistry as one of the best 50 albums of 2001.

== Track listing ==
All songs written by Dan Wilson, except where noted.

No.	Title	Writer(s)	Length
1.	"Chemistry"		4:08
2.	"Bed"		4:05
3.	"Act Naturally"		3:42
4.	"She's Got My Number"		5:02
5.	"Follow"		3:44
6.	"Sunshine & Chocolate"		3:35
7.	"Who's Stopping You?"	John Munson, Wilson	3:06
8.	"I Wish"		7:56
9.	"One True Love"	Wilson, Carole King	3:51
10.	"Get a Grip"		3:35
11.	"Surprise"		3:48
12.	"El Matador"	Jacob Slichter	5:08

== Charts ==
Chart (2001)	Peak position
Canadian Albums Chart	125
U.S. Billboard 200	103

== Personnel ==
- Dan Wilson – vocals, guitars, piano, keyboards
- John Munson – bass, piano, keyboards, trombone
- Jacob Slichter – drums, piano, keyboards

Guest musicians

- Ken Chastain – congas on "Act Naturally", darbuca on "Sunshine & Chocolate", Korg WaveDrum on "I Wish", tabla on "El Matador"
- Carole King – vocals, electric piano on "One True Love"
- Matt Wilson – additional vocals, synth on "Bed"
- John Fields – co-producer, synths, loops, bass on "Sunshine & Chocolate"- co-producer, synth bass on "I Wish"
- Gary Louris – guitar solo on "I Wish"
- Shane Washington – French horn on "Surprise"
