= Secret Smile (song) =

1999 single by Semisonic

- Artwork used for the commercial European and Australian releases

Single by Semisonic

from the album Feeling Strangely Fine
- B-side: "Completely Pleased"; "Erotic City"; "Take Me with You" (live)
- Released: January 11, 1999
- Studio: Seedy Underbelly (Minneapolis, Minnesota)
- Genre: Alternative rock; power pop
- Length: 4:37
- Label: MCA
- Songwriter: Dan Wilson
- Producer: Nick Launay

Semisonic singles chronology
"Singing in My Sleep" (1998)	"Secret Smile" (1999)	"Chemistry" (2001)

"Secret Smile" is a song by American rock band Semisonic. The single, released to American radio on January 11, 1999, gained the band brief international popularity. A live version of the song recorded at The Gorge Amphitheatre, as well as a mix by the Orb had previously been released as a B-side to "Singing in My Sleep". The song was featured in the film Simply Irresistible and in the TV series Charmed and Dawson's Creek.

== Composition ==
Songwriter Dan Wilson has said that the melody for the song came to him in a dream, and he woke up in the middle of the night, rushed to a piano, and wrote it down.

"...Secret Smile, the first half of it came to me in a dream. I woke up in very early morning hours with this song playing in my head. I got up, ran to a piano, and I wrote down the words that I heard in my mind and I played the chords on the piano and wrote down the names of the chords. Then I went back to sleep. And then the next day when I woke up, I remembered the song from the dream. I went to the piano and I saw my notes. I played the song and I thought, Well, this is great. It must be some song that I've heard before. Then I asked all my friends about it, and they all said, 'No, that sounds like a song of yours.'"

== Music video ==
The music video was shot in Los Angeles in January 1999 and was directed by British music video director Sophie Muller. Paul Rudd and Laura Prepon both appear.

== Track listings ==
UK CD1

1. "Secret Smile" (remix edit) – 3:45
2. "Completely Pleased" – 3:17
3. "Erotic City" – 3:34

UK CD2

1. "Secret Smile" (album edit) – 3:45
2. "Singing in My Sleep" (remix full version) – 4:28
3. "Take Me with You" (live) – 4:08
4. "Secret Smile" (video)

UK cassette single

1. "Secret Smile" (album edit) – 3:45
2. "Take Me with You" (live) – 4:08

European CD single

1. "Secret Smile" – 3:46
2. "Completely Pleased" – 3:19

Australasian CD single

1. "Secret Smile" – 3:46
2. "Completely Pleased" – 3:19
3. "Erotic City" – 3:35
4. "Secret Smile" (full-length remix) – 4:27

== Credits and personnel ==
Credits are lifted from the US promo CD liner notes and the Feeling Strangely Fine album notes.

Studios

- Recorded and produced at Seedy Underbelly (Minneapolis, Minnesota)
- Mixed at Mix This! (Pacific Palisades, Los Angeles)
- Mastered at Gateway Mastering (Portland, Maine, US)

Personnel

- Dan Wilson – writing, lead vocals, guitar, Rhodes piano, string and flute arrangement
- John Munson – vocals, bass, Moog
- Jacob Slichter – vocals, drums, string and flute arrangement, conducting
- Bruce Allard – strings
- Mary Bahr – strings
- Carolyn Boulay – strings
- Troy Gardner – strings
- Josh Koestenbaum – strings
- Nick Launay – production, recording
- Brad Kern – additional recording
- Alex Oana – assistant recording engineer
- Richard Werbowenko – assistant recording engineer
- Shane Washington – assistant recording engineer
- Bob Clearmountain – mixing (album version)
- Ryan Freeland – assistant mix engineering
- James Saez – assistant mix engineering
- Tom Lord-Alge – mixing (remix)
- Jennifer Munson – digital editing
- Bob Ludwig – mastering

== Charts ==
=== Weekly charts ===
Chart (1999)	Peak position
Canada Top Singles (RPM)	30
Canada Rock/Alternative (RPM)	30
Europe (Eurochart Hot 100)	47
Ireland (IRMA)	26
Scottish Singles Sales (Official Charts)	11
UK Singles (Official Charts)	12
US Adult Alternative Airplay (Billboard)	17
US Adult Pop Airplay (Billboard)	35
US Alternative Airplay (Billboard)	21
US CHR/Pop (Radio & Records)	42

=== Year-end charts ===
Chart (1999)	Position
UK Singles (OCC)	114

== Certifications ==
Region	Certification	Certified units/sales
United Kingdom (BPI)	Gold	400,000^{‡}
^{‡} Sales+streaming figures based on certification alone.

== Release history ==
Region	Date	Format(s)	Label(s)	Ref.
United States	January 11, 1999	Active rock radio	MCA	
United States	January 12, 1999	Contemporary hit radio	MCA	
United Kingdom	June 28, 1999	CD; cassette	MCA	
