= Feeling Strangely Fine =

Studio album by Semisonic
- Released: March 24, 1998
- Recorded: April–August 1997
- Studios: Seedy Underbelly Studio, Minneapolis, Minnesota
- Genres: Alternative rock; power pop; post-grunge; pop rock
- Length: 50:31
- Label: MCA
- Producer: Nick Launay

Semisonic chronology
Great Divide (1996)	Feeling Strangely Fine (1998)	All About Chemistry (2001)

Singles from Feeling Strangely Fine
- 1. "Closing Time" Released: February 23, 1998; 2. "Singing in My Sleep" Released: August 18, 1998; 3. "Secret Smile" Released: January 11, 1999

Professional ratings
Review scores
Source	Rating
AllMusic	4/5 stars
Entertainment Weekly	B
MusicHound Rock: The Essential Album Guide	4.5/5 stars
NME	5/10
Q	4/5 stars
Robert Christgau	(dud)
Rolling Stone	3.5/5 stars
The Rolling Stone Album Guide	3.5/5 stars

Feeling Strangely Fine is the second studio album by American rock band Semisonic. It is the follow-up to the band's debut album Great Divide recorded at Seedy Underbelly Studio in Minneapolis, Minnesota. The album contains some of Semisonic's best-known songs, including the major radio hit "Closing Time", as well as the singles "Singing in My Sleep" and "Secret Smile". The song "Never You Mind" was featured in the 1999 film Never Been Kissed.

== Recording ==
The band had over 60 new songs in mind as they went into the recording process and had three specific requirements when they decided they wanted to record a new album. First, they didn't want to record any demotapes beyond simple guitar and vocal basement sketches, meaning the album versions would be the first band recordings of the songs. Second, they wanted no deadline for the finished masters. Third, the trio wanted to create tracks for the album in various hi- and lo-tech settings around Minneapolis, and use their computers to meld the different sounds together. Nick Launay was brought in to produce the album and the band recorded twenty songs over the course of four months. They pared those down to sixteen, mixed them, and used the best twelve for the finished record.

== Track listing ==
All tracks written by Dan Wilson unless otherwise noted.

Feeling Strangely Fine track listing
No.	Title	Writer(s)	Length
1.	"Closing Time"		4:33
2.	"Singing in My Sleep"		4:30
3.	"Made to Last"		5:02
4.	"Never You Mind"	Wilson, Jacob Slichter	4:24
5.	"Secret Smile"		4:39
6.	"DND"		4:11
7.	"Completely Pleased"		3:19
8.	"This Will Be My Year"	Slichter	4:32
9.	"All Worked Out"		2:52
10.	"California"		5:29
11.	"She Spreads Her Wings"	John Munson	3:06
12.	"Gone to the Movies"		3:52

20th anniversary edition bonus tracks
No.	Title	Length
13.	"Long Way from Home"	4:05
14.	"I'm a Liar"	4:24
15.	"Beautiful Regret"	3:56
16.	"Makin' a Plan"	4:10

== Personnel ==
Semisonic

- John Munson – bass guitar (all tracks), background vocals (all tracks except 11), lead vocals (track 11), additional guitar (track 2), all guitars (track 11), wah wah guitar (track 12), trembly guitar (track 4), Moog synthesizer (tracks 5, 7, 8), slide guitar solo (track 6), Moog bass (track 10), piano (track 1), loops (track 10)
- Jacob Slichter – drums (all tracks), background vocals (all tracks), string arrangements (tracks 1, 5, 6, 12), piano (tracks 8, 9, 11), string arrangement (tracks 1, 5, 12), Rhodes electric piano (track 3), Wurlitzer electric piano (tracks 2), Mellotron (track 11), Moog synthesizer (track 8), loops (track 10), flute arrangement (track 5)
- Dan Wilson – lead vocals (all tracks except 11), background vocals (track 11), guitar (all tracks except 11), piano (tracks 3, 4, 7), string arrangement (tracks 5, 6), Rhodes electric piano (track 5), synth whistle (track 4), drum loops (track 6), flute arrangement (track 5)

Additional personnel

- Bruce Allard – strings (tracks 1, 5, 6, 12)
- Mary Bahr – strings (tracks 1, 5, 6, 12)
- Carolyn Boulay – strings (tracks 1, 5, 6, 12)
- Troy Gardner – strings (tracks 1, 5, 6, 12)
- Josh Koestenbaum – strings (tracks 1, 5, 6, 12)
- Matt Wilson – lead guitar (track 4)

== Charts ==
=== Weekly charts ===
Weekly chart performance for Feeling Strangely Fine
Chart (1998–1999)	Peak position
Australian Albums (ARIA)	66
Canada Top Albums/CDs (RPM)	55
New Zealand Albums (RMNZ)	17
Scottish Albums (Official Charts)	11
UK Albums (OCC)	16
US Billboard 200	43

=== Year-end charts ===
Year-end chart performance for Feeling Strangely Fine
Chart (1998)	Position
US Billboard 200	114
Chart (1999)	Position
UK Albums (OCC)	69
Chart (2000)	Position
UK Albums (OCC)	161

== Certifications ==
Certifications for Feeling Strangely Fine
Region	Certification	Certified units/sales
Canada (Music Canada)	Gold	50,000^{^}
United Kingdom (BPI)	Platinum	350,000
United States (RIAA)	Platinum	1,000,000^{^}
^{^} Shipments figures based on certification alone.
