= Singing in My Sleep =

Single by Semisonic

from the album Feeling Strangely Fine
- Released: August 18, 1998
- Genre: Alternative rock; pop rock; power pop
- Length: 4:32 (album version); 4:03 (single version)
- Label: MCA
- Songwriter: Dan Wilson
- Producer: Nick Launay

Semisonic singles chronology
"Closing Time" (1998)	"Singing in My Sleep" (1998)	"Secret Smile" (1999)

Music video
- "Singing in My Sleep" on YouTube

"Singing in My Sleep" is a song by American rock band Semisonic. It was released on August 18, 1998, as the second single from their second studio album, Feeling Strangely Fine (1998). It was written by Dan Wilson and produced by Nick Launay. In the United States, it reached number 11 on the Billboard Modern Rock Tracks chart and number 31 on the Billboard Mainstream Rock Tracks chart. Two years later, in March 2000, the single peaked at number 39 in the United Kingdom.

== Writing and composition ==
In a 2014 interview with The A.V. Club, Dan Wilson recalled how the idea for the song came about: "Someone that I knew had sent me an amazing mixtape, and I was loving every song. A way to seduce someone is to make them a list of music, a playlist that, once they hear, they’re more likely to fall in love with you." He incorporated the word "Sony" into the song's lyrics because the company logo was visible at the center of the mixtape as he watched it going around in his cassette player. Another lyric, "Did you ever look so nice", was the name of one of the songs that had been included on the mixtape. Wilson said the lyrics came easily once he allowed himself to use these phrases. This was one of the Semisonic songs for which band member Jacob Slichter played the keyboard parts with his right hand while playing drums simultaneously.

== Music video ==
The music video for "Singing in My Sleep" was directed by Chris Applebaum. The band invited fans from its e-mail list to participate in a song swap in which fans could help choose songs for an "Ultimate Mix Tape," to be used in the "Singing in My Sleep" video. In exchange, those fans received a personalized "thank you" token from the band, while the winner was also sent a copy of the video clip.

== Critical reception ==
A review of "Singing in My Sleep" in the August 15, 1998, issue of Billboard said the song's intro is "a shapeship-like whir and a funny, plinking melody", but that ultimately, the track is "pure, mass-consumption pop." In a review of the maxi-single, Michael Frey of Allmusic called it "a melodic ode to the art of making mix tapes". PopMatters' Cindy Speer described it as "the perfect song for anyone who's ever made or received a mix tape for/from that possible new someone", and remarked that Wilson "perfectly captures the ambiguity and thrill of the situation" with his lyrics. Ian Cohen of Stylus Magazine wrote that the song is "a delicious bit of power-pop" that is far less "mawk-ish" than the band's "Closing Time".

== Personnel ==
Personnel are taken from the Feeling Strangely Fine liner notes.

- Dan Wilson – lead vocals, guitar
- John Munson – bass guitar, backing vocals, additional guitar
- Jacob Slichter – drums, backing vocals, Wurlitzer electric piano

== Charts ==
=== Weekly charts ===
Chart (1998–2000)	Peak position
Australia (ARIA)	70
Scotland Singles (OCC)	26
US Alternative Airplay (Billboard)	11
US Mainstream Rock (Billboard)	31
UK Singles (OCC)	39

=== Year-end charts ===
Chart (1998)	Position
US Modern Rock Tracks (Billboard)	60

== Release history ==
Region	Date	Format(s)	Label(s)	Ref.
United States	August 18, 1998	Contemporary hit radio	MCA	
United Kingdom	March 20, 2000	CD; cassette	MCA	
