= Matt Wilson (singer) =

American musician known for Trip Shakespeare, born 1963

- Born: Matthew Robert Wilson; March 28, 1963 (age 63); Hennepin County, Minnesota, U.S.
- Genres: Alternative rock, rock
- Instruments: Vocals, guitar, drums
- Label: Planet Maker Records
- Formerly of: Trip Shakespeare, The Flops, The Twilight Hours, Polara

Matthew Robert "Matt" Wilson (born March 28, 1963) is an American singer-songwriter best known as the frontman of the band Trip Shakespeare.

== Career ==
While Wilson was an English concentrator at Harvard University, he met John Munson and Elaine Harris and formed the band Trip Shakespeare. After the breakup he was a drummer for a Minneapolis band called Polara. He also produced albums for Steel Shank, Magnet, The Wonsers, and Velma.

In 1998, he released an album called Burnt, White and Blue on his own label, Planet Maker Records.

He had an online project called "Main Output" at MattWilson.com (which is now owned by a different Matt Wilson) where he posted songs in progress (like "The Follidaze of Highland Heights", "Raking Service" and "Troublemaker") and funny photo journals but eventually abandoned it.

From 2001 to 2005, Wilson and John Munson performed as The Flops, renamed "The Twilight Hours" in 2008. Wilson's brother Dan Wilson later co-founded the band Semisonic.

Wilson currently performs as Matt Wilson and His Orchestra, and has performed as a member of The Twilight Hours.
