= The New Standards =

Minimalist jazz trio formed in Minneapolis, Minnesota, in 2005

- Origin: Minneapolis, Minnesota, United States
- Genres: Jazz
- Years active: 2005–present
- Labels: Princess
- Members: Chan Poling; John Munson; Steve Roehm
- Website: www.thenewstandards.com

The New Standards is a minimalist jazz trio formed in Minneapolis, Minnesota, in 2005 and composed of Chan Poling (of The Suburbs), John Munson (of The Twilight Hours, Semisonic, Trip Shakespeare and The Flops) and Steve Roehm (of Electropolis, Rhombus and Billy Goat). With Poling on piano, Munson on bass and Roehm on vibraphone, the band reinterprets songs from a wide variety of genres, from classics like Rodgers and Hammerstein's My Favorite Things to London Calling by The Clash.

In September 2005, the band released a self-titled album produced by former Trip Shakespeare / Semisonic band member, Dan Wilson. In December 2008, the band released its second album Rock and Roll. In December 2012, the trio released its third album, Sunday Morning Coming Down.

== Discography ==
=== Studio albums ===
- 2005: The New Standards
- 2008: Rock and Roll
- 2012: Sunday Morning Coming Down
- 2015: Decade

=== Holiday EPs ===
- 2011: Christmas Time Next Year
- 2011: Seven Songs of Comfort and Joy
- 2007: Candy Cane

== Members ==
- Chan Poling – vocals, piano
- John Munson – vocals, bass
- Steve Roehm – vibraphone
