= The Twilight Hours =

US musical group

- Origin: Minneapolis
- Genres: Folk rock
- Years active: 2008–present
- Members: Matt Wilson; John Munson; Steve Roehm; Jacques Wait; Dave Salmela; Richard Medek
- Website: thetwilighthours.com

The Twilight Hours is a band formed by Matt Wilson and John Munson. Munson and Wilson also played together in Trip Shakespeare and The Flops, and Munson is also known for his work with Semisonic, The New Standards, and John Munson and the Witnesses.

== Background ==
Founding members Wilson and Munson first performed together in the band E. Brown and then in Trip Shakespeare. Trip Shakespeare was picked up by A&M records but did not achieve commercial success. Munson joined with Wilson's brother Dan, who had also been a member of Trip Shakespeare, to form the band Semisonic, along with Jacob Slichter. Semisonic was signed by MCA and received enough airplay to have some of their songs reach the Pop and Modern charts. During this time Matt Wilson began a solo career and released the "Burnt, White, and Blue" album. When Semisonic went on hiatus, Munson reunited with Wilson and formed The Flops which was dissolved in 2005 as the pair decided to move their music in a new direction and the band The Twilight Hours began to take shape.

== Formation ==
The Twilight Hours was first envisioned as strictly a duo between Matt Wilson and John Munson, where they would limit themselves to upright bass and acoustic guitar. As they progressed they soon abandoned the idea and added drums, electric guitar and electric bass rather than upright bass. In an interview with public television Wilson described forming the band and stated "It's right back to the same phantom sound we have been chasing for years and years." Munson described the growth of The Twilight Hours saying "Now the band has kind of evolved a sound, so you bring in this new song and the band makes it alive, it very quickly becomes a living work of art."

== Discography ==
- Stereo Night (2009)
- Black Beauty (2016)

== Members ==
2008–2015

- Matt Wilson – vocals, guitar
- John Munson – bass guitar, vocals ukulele
- Steve Roehm – drums
- Jacques Wait – guitar
- Dave Salmela – keyboards, vocals

2016–present

- Matt Wilson – vocals, occasional guitar
- John Munson – bass guitar, vocals, ukulele
- Steve Roehm – guitar
- Jacques Wait – guitar
- Dave Salmela – keyboards, vocals
- Richard Medek – drums
