= Ben Goldsmith (musician) =

American singer-songwriter

- Origin: Long Island, New York
- Genres: Alternative/Indie, Rock
- Occupation: Singer-songwriter
- Instruments: Vocals, Guitar, Piano
- Years active: 2018 – present

Ben Goldsmith is a singer/songwriter from Long Island, New York. He is currently signed to Sony Music Nashville/ Free Flight Records.

== Early life ==
Ben Goldsmith grew up in Merrick, NY in a musical family. His mom, who was a classical violinist, introduced him to the violin but he soon moved on to guitar. His grandfather was a professional saxophonist that he shares a close relationship with. By the age of 11 he released an EP of original music, playing all the instruments.

Before the age of 13 he went on a five city tour with the School of Rock All Stars which included a stop at Lollapalooza. At 13, Ben studied jazz guitar at the Manhattan School of Music and the Mannes School of Music. He then was put in touch with Berklee Professor Tomo Fujita, who previously taught John Mayer, among others. He often speaks of his parents sacrificing weekends driving back and forth to Boston so that he could take guitar lessons with Fujita, whom he credits as a mentor, and for helping him find his voice and tone on the guitar.

== Music career ==
Ben started to explore production and songwriting more seriously when he was locked down over 2020. He spent days in his bedroom as a young teen writing and producing music. He was introduced via his manager to Brad Jones, a local Nashville producer. He referred to Brad as his shepherd into the recording world and used his studio as a workshop to create and experiment. Brad encouraged Ben to collaborate with other songwriters in town to further develop his songwriting skills. In the summer of 2021 Ben was given a slot at Whiskey Jam in Nashville Tennessee. A video that was posted by Whiskey Jam’s founder, Ward Gunther, led to several labels reaching out to Goldsmith. Goldsmith ultimately ended up performing privately for executives at Sony Music Nashville and was signed. He was sixteen year old. Ben was signed to Universal Music Publishing as an artist/songwriter. He was simultaneously signed to United Talent Agency.

Goldsmith became the flagship artist for Sony Nashville’s imprint Free Flight Records, a label with a strong pop and singer-songwriter heritage. Goldsmith graduated high school a year early and was accepted to the prestigious Clive Davis program at NYU for Music Production. He took a gap year and moved to Nashville to live closer to his label and continue songwriting. After the year off Goldsmith withdrew his NYU admission to continue building his career.

Goldsmith headed directly to Tennessee after high school graduation because he landed a slot on 2023 Bonnaroo lineup playing next to artists such as Paramore, Foo Fighters, and more. .

Ben performed in Tempe Arizona at the Extra Innings Festival in 2024 amongst the lineup that included Noah Kahan, The Dave Matthew’s Band, and Morgan Wade.

In 2024 he released the song “Crazy” from his sophomore album The Start Of Something Beautiful which was released on 13 September.

He collaborates with a number of writers and artists on the album including Rick Nowels (Lana Del Rey), Alex Hope (Troye Sivan, Alec Benjamin) and Peter Fenn (Myles Smith, Deyaz).

Goldsmith was featured in The Hollywood Reporter’s as one of their 18 and under emerging artists.

Goldsmith was one of several Sony artists featured in the online game Roblox where fans could purchase his guitar case as part of the game.

Goldsmith and music producer Peter Fenn partnered with Sony Electronics and Sony SoundClub Presents at the Sony Pictures Lot in Culver City for a live recording session.

== Discography ==
=== Albums ===
- “The World Between My Ears” (Free Flight Records/Sony Music, September 22, 2023)
- “The Start of Something Beautiful” (Free Flight Records/Sony Music, September 13, 2024)

=== Singles ===
- “Hold On To Me” (Free Flight Records/Sony Music, November 10, 2023)
