= Chemistry (Semisonic song) =

2001 single by Semisonic

Single by Semisonic

from the album All About Chemistry
- Released: January 8, 2001
- Genre: Blue-eyed soul; pop rock; power pop
- Length: 4:09 (album version); 3:53 (edit)
- Label: MCA
- Songwriter: Dan Wilson
- Producer: Semisonic

Semisonic singles chronology
"Secret Smile" (1999)	"Chemistry" (2001)	"Get a Grip" (2001)

Music video
- Semisonic - Chemistry on YouTube

"Chemistry" is a song by American rock band Semisonic. It was released as the first single on their third studio album, All About Chemistry (2001). Released to US radio on January 8, 2001, the song reached number six on the US Billboard Triple-A chart, number 21 in New Zealand, and the top 40 in Ireland and the United Kingdom.

== Music video ==
The music video for this song was filmed in 2000 in a house in Silver Lake, California. The video was directed by Liz Friedlander. It features the journey of a small silver ball which, at one stage, passes through a Rube Goldberg machine, and includes a series of domestic disasters.

== Track listings ==
UK CD single

1. "Chemistry" (single edit)
2. "Over My Head"
3. "Chemistry" (The Drumhammer remix)
4. "Chemistry" (video)

UK cassette single

1. "Chemistry" (single edit)
2. "Over My Head"

European CD single

1. "Chemistry" (radio edit)
2. "Girlfriend"

European and Australian maxi-CD single

1. "Chemistry" (radio edit) – 3:53
2. "Girlfriend" – 3:44
3. "Chemistry" (The Drumhammer remix) – 6:40
4. "Chemistry" (enhanced video)

Japanese CD single

1. "Chemistry" (radio edit)
2. "Girlfriend"
3. "Chemistry" (The Drumhammer remix)

== Charts ==
=== Weekly charts ===
Chart (2001)	Peak position
Ireland (IRMA)	39
Netherlands (Single Top 100)	85
New Zealand (Recorded Music NZ)	21
Scotland Singles (OCC)	24
UK Singles (OCC)	35
US Adult Alternative Airplay (Billboard)	6
US Adult Pop Airplay (Billboard)	31
US Alternative Airplay (Billboard)	39

=== Year-end charts ===
Chart (2001)	Position
US Adult Top 40 (Billboard)	80
US Triple-A (Billboard)	33

== Release history ==
Region	Date	Format(s)	Label(s)	Ref(s).
United States	January 8, 2001	Hot AC; triple A; alternative radio	MCA	
Australia	February 12, 2001	CD	MCA	
United States	February 13, 2001	Contemporary hit radio	MCA	
United Kingdom	February 19, 2001	CD; cassette	MCA	
Japan	March 23, 2001	CD	MCA	
