= Sierra Spirit =

Native-American singer-songwriter

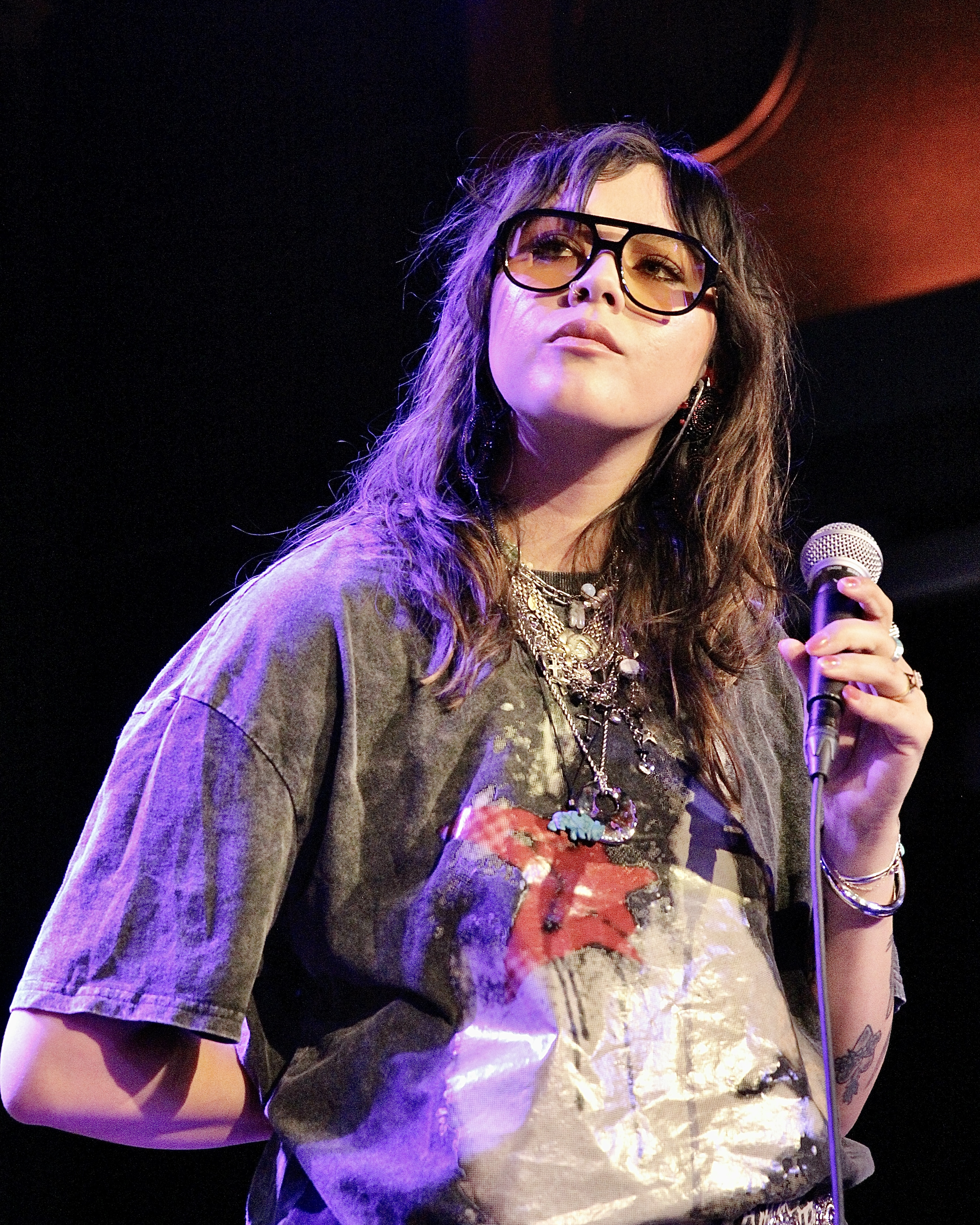
- Sierra Spirit performing at SXSW 2025 on the JBL Sound Stage.
- Born: Tulsa, Oklahoma
- Years active: 2024-Present
- Website: sierraspirit.komi.io

Sierra Spirit Kihega, known professionally as Sierra Spirit, is a Native American singer-songwriter from Tulsa, Oklahoma, United States. She is a member of the Otoe-Missouria and Keetoowah Cherokee tribes. Her music blends indie rock with guitar-driven melodies and deeply personal lyrics, drawing inspiration from her lived experiences and cultural background.

== Early life ==
Sierra Spirit Kihega was born and raised in Oklahoma, where she grew up within driving distance of both her tribes' reservations. Her early exposure to classic country music and the rich musical heritage of Oklahoma influenced her sound. Self-taught on guitar and piano, Spirit began writing songs at a young age but struggled to find her artistic footing until her early 20s.

== Musical style and influences ==
Sierra Spirit's sound is characterized by melancholy, guitar-driven melodies and introspective lyrics. She cites artists such as Phoebe Bridgers, The Japanese House, and Ethel Cain as musical influences. Spirit taught herself guitar by learning Bridgers' album Stranger in the Alps, which became a formative part of her musical journey.

== Career ==
Spirit began recording her debut EP, Coin Toss, in collaboration with producer Aaron Taos after they spent two weeks recording together. The EP explores themes of loss, love, mental health, and self-discovery.

Her debut single, "Ghost", delves into the emotional exhaustion of a one-sided relationship. The song reflects feelings of vulnerability and the desire to retreat from a connection where one feels exposed and undervalued.

== Personal life and advocacy ==
Spirit has spoken openly about her struggles with depression and anxiety, as well as the impact of mental illness and addiction within the Native American community. She hopes her music can help destigmatize mental health issues, particularly among Indigenous people, where cultural expectations of stoicism often discourage vulnerability. Spirit has said her goal is to create music that resonates with others and helps listeners feel seen and understood.

As an Indigenous artist, Spirit emphasizes the importance of representation in the music industry. She credits her motivation to the absence of Native musicians to look up to during her childhood, stating that she wants to be that inspiration for future generations of Indigenous artists.

== Discography ==
Extended plays

Title	Details
Stripped Sessions	Released May 22, 2024
Coin Toss	Released October 10, 2024

Singles

Title	Details
"Ghost"	Released February 7, 2024
"Televangelic"	Released March 13, 2024
"I'll Find You"	Released April 17, 2024
"I'll Be Waiting (Pug)"	Released July 11, 2024
"Bleed You"	Released August 14, 2024
"Better Wild"	Released September 18, 2024
"Creep"	Released October 25, 2024
"American Pie"	Released January 28, 2025
