= Closing Time (Semisonic song) =

1998 single by Semisonic

Single by Semisonic

from the album Feeling Strangely Fine
- Released: February 23, 1998
- Recorded: 1997
- Studio: Seedy Underbelly (Minneapolis, Minnesota)
- Genre: Alternative rock; post-grunge; power pop; pop rock
- Length: 4:33 (album version); 3:49 (single version)
- Label: MCA
- Songwriter: Dan Wilson
- Producer: Nick Launay

Semisonic singles chronology
| "F.N.T." (1996) | "Closing Time" (1998) | "Singing in My Sleep" (1998) |

Audio sample
- file; help

Music video
- "Closing Time" on YouTube

"Closing Time" is a song by American rock band Semisonic. It was released on February 23, 1998, as the lead single from their second studio album, Feeling Strangely Fine, and began to receive mainstream radio airplay on April 27, 1998. The ballad was written by Dan Wilson and produced by Nick Launay.

The single reached number one on the US Billboard Modern Rock Tracks chart and entered the top 50 in Australia, Ireland, New Zealand, and the United Kingdom. It was nominated for the Grammy Award for Best Rock Song at the 41st Annual Grammy Awards in 1999. The song reappeared on the charts of three countries in 2011 after being featured in the movie Friends with Benefits and "Doomsday", an 8th season episode of the television sitcom The Office; it attained its highest chart peaks in Australia and Ireland during this period.

While the song is about people leaving a bar at closing time (also called last call), and widely interpreted as such, drummer Jacob Slichter has also indicated that the song was written by Wilson "in anticipation of fatherhood" and that it is about "being sent forth from the womb as if by a bouncer clearing out a bar".

== Background and composition ==
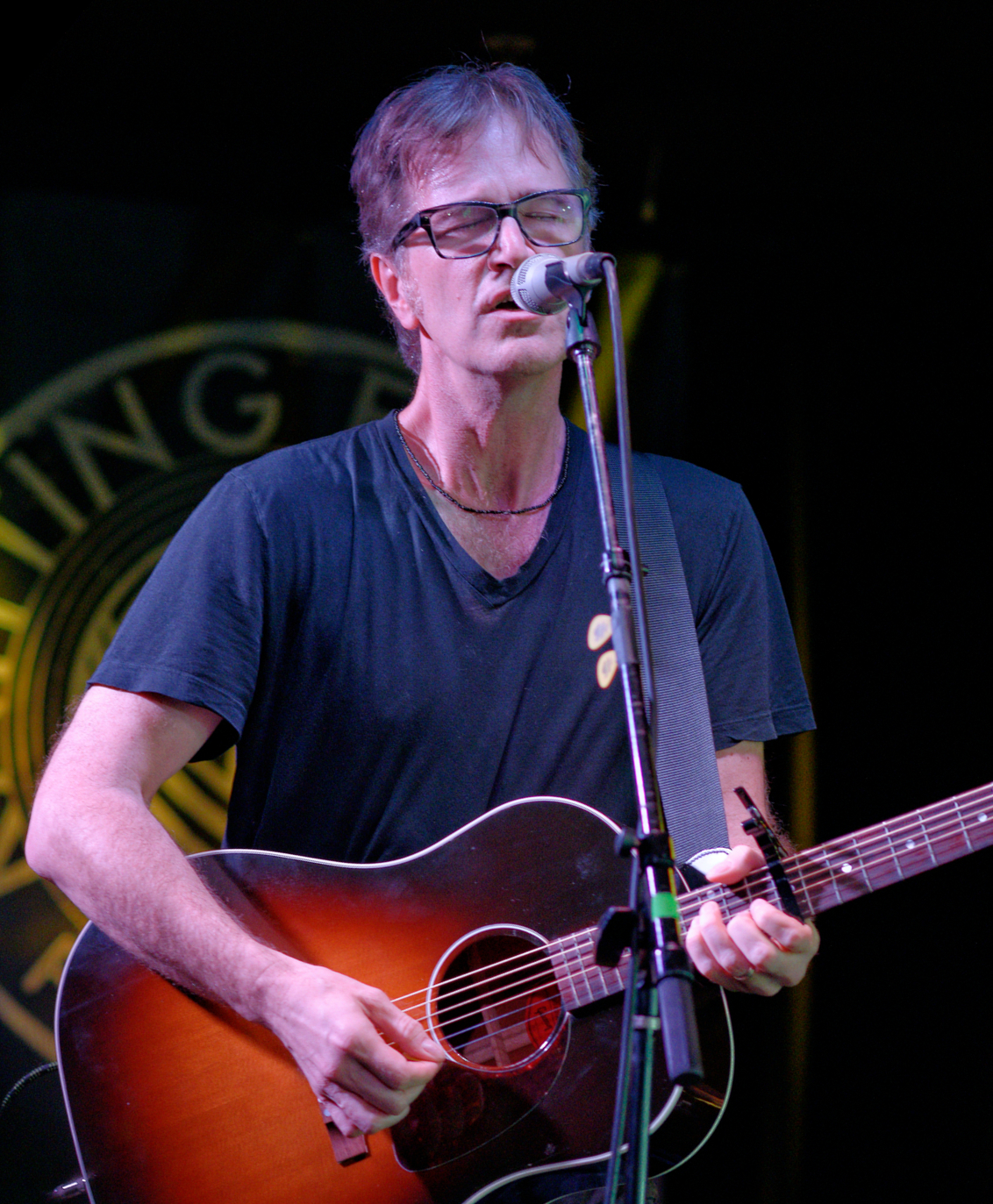
While often played at the end of parties, frontman Dan Wilson has stated it is a metaphor for childbirth.

Prior to composing "Closing Time", Semisonic usually ended their concerts with the song "If I Run". The band grew tired of playing this song every night and so Dan Wilson set out to write a new song that they could play at the end of their set. Wilson's girlfriend Diane Espaldon was pregnant at the time and although Wilson did not set out consciously to write a song about giving birth, he has stated that "Part way into the writing of the song, I realized it was also about being born."

Jacob Slichter, the drummer for Semisonic, said in 2006 that payola was how they turned "Closing Time" into a hit. Slichter stated: "It cost something close to $700,000 to $800,000 to get 'Closing Time' on the air."

== Critical reception ==
Billboard magazine described "Closing Time" as an "instantly memorable rock ditty", saying, "...the core of 'Closing Time' is pure pop with a sticky chorus that will have you singing along before the end of your first listen. This could be the jam that establishes Semisonic as the top 40 heroes they deserve to be." Doug Reece of the same magazine called the song "impossibly hooky". "Closing Time" was placed at number 19 on Rolling Stone's 2007 list of the "20 Most Annoying Songs".

== Music video ==
The song's music video features a split screen technique, seen here.

The music video was directed by Chris Applebaum. It involves a split screen in which Wilson and the band performing the song together are on the right side while a woman (played by Denise Franco) working in a cafe she is about to close for the night is on the left. The woman tries to call Wilson, but he does not hear the phone ring or see the message she left due to his performing the song. Both she and Wilson then each leave their respective locations and make their way through the streets to the same club. The woman gets there first, looks around, and leaves. She walks just past Wilson as he comes in, with neither of them seeing the other. Wilson also then looks around for the woman too and then leaves. The video ends as Wilson meets the band outside by the car and shrugs.

== Usage in other media ==
This song is frequently used by some radio stations as their last song before changing formats, mostly alternative rock stations. Most notably on November 16, 2016, Fort Worth and Dallas, Texas-based alternative station KDGE (102.1 FM) played a continuous loop of "Closing Time" while redirecting its listeners to its area sister mainstream rock station KEGL (97.1 FM). This continued until 5 p.m. on November 17, 2016, when the station flipped to Christmas music then full-time to a mainstream adult contemporary format on December 26.

In 2015 five Target employees of a Canadian store scheduled to be closed made a video titled "Semisonic-Closing Time (Target Cover)" which consists of two employees wheeling around the three-employee band with guitarist, drummer using a shopping hand basket and the singer singing Closing Time as their "sad eulogy to their fading workplace."

On March 17, 2025, the official White House Twitter account posted a video of an undocumented immigrant getting arrested, featuring lines from the song. During that same day, White House press secretary Karoline Leavitt used lyrics from the song to describe forcing undocumented immigrants out of the United States. The band reacted negatively to the post in a statement to the press, writing "We did not authorize or condone the White House's use of our song in any way, and no, they didn't ask. The song is about joy and possibilities and hope, and they have missed the point entirely."

== Track listings ==
Australian CD single

1. "Closing Time" (Bob Clearmountain mix) – 3:50
2. "F.N.T." (Tom Lord-Alge mix) – 3:29
3. "Made to Last" – 5:03
4. "Closing Time" – 4:34

European CD single

1. "Closing Time" (radio edit) – 3:49
2. "Delicious" – 3:58

European maxi-CD single

1. "Closing Time" (Clearmountain mix) – 3:49
2. "Delicious" – 3:58
3. "Gone to the Movies" – 3:52
4. "Closing Time" (album version) – 4:35

UK CD1

1. "Closing Time" (remix edit) – 3:49
2. "Falling" (live) – 3:31
3. "Long Way from Home" – 5:20

UK CD2

1. "Closing Time" (album edit) – 3:52
2. "F.N.T." (live acoustic) – 3:16
3. "Air That I Breathe" – 4:21
4. "Closing Time" (video)

UK cassette single

A. "Closing Time" (remix edit) – 3:49
B. "Air That I Breathe" – 4:21

Japanese CD single

1. "Closing Time"
2. "F.N.T."
3. "Made to Last"
4. "Closing Time" (album version video)

== Credits and personnel ==
Credits are lifted from the Feeling Strangely Fine liner notes.

Studios

- Recorded and produced at Seedy Underbelly (Minneapolis, Minnesota)
- Mixed at Ocean Way Recording (Los Angeles)
- Mastered at Gateway Mastering (Portland, Maine, US)

Personnel

- Dan Wilson – writing, lead vocals, guitar
- John Munson – vocals, bass, piano
- Jacob Slichter – vocals, drums, string arrangement, conducting
- Bruce Allard – strings
- Mary Bahr – strings
- Carolyn Boulay – strings
- Troy Gardner – strings
- Josh Koestenbaum – strings
- Nick Launay – production, recording
- Brad Kern – additional recording
- Alex Oana – assistant recording engineer
- Richard Werbowenko – assistant recording engineer
- Shane Washington – assistant recording engineer
- Jack Joseph Puig – mixing
- Jim Champagne – assistant mixing engineer
- Bob Ludwig – mastering

== Charts ==
=== Weekly charts ===
| Chart (1998–1999) | Peak position |
|---|---|
| Australia (ARIA) | 50 |
| Canada Rock/Alternative (RPM) | 2 |
| Netherlands (Single Top 100) | 84 |
| New Zealand (Recorded Music NZ) | 50 |
| Scottish Singles Sales (Official Charts) | 17 |
| UK Singles (Official Charts) | 25 |
| US Radio Songs (Billboard) | 11 |
| US Adult Alternative Airplay (Billboard) | 4 |
| US Adult Pop Airplay (Billboard) | 4 |
| US Alternative Airplay (Billboard) | 1 |
| US Mainstream Rock Airplay (Billboard) | 13 |
| US Pop Airplay (Billboard) | 8 |

| Chart (2011–2012) | Peak position |
|---|---|
| Australia (ARIA) | 40 |
| Ireland (IRMA) | 48 |
| UK Singles (Official Charts) | 71 |

=== Year-end charts ===
| Chart (1998) | Position |
|---|---|
| Canada Top Singles (RPM) | 33 |
| Canada Rock/Alternative (RPM) | 15 |
| US Hot 100 Airplay (Billboard) | 27 |
| US Adult Top 40 (Billboard) | 15 |
| US Mainstream Rock Tracks (Billboard) | 33 |
| US Mainstream Top 40 (Billboard) | 27 |
| US Modern Rock Tracks (Billboard) | 3 |
| US Triple-A (Billboard) | 10 |

== Certifications ==
| Region | Certification | Certified units/sales |
|---|---|---|
| New Zealand (RMNZ) | 2× Platinum | 60,000^{‡} |
| United Kingdom (BPI) Sales since 2004 | Platinum | 600,000^{‡} |
^{‡} Sales+streaming figures based on certification alone.

== Release history ==
| Region | Date | Format(s) | Label(s) | Ref(s). |
|---|---|---|---|---|
| United States | February 23, 1998 | Mainstream rock; modern rock; triple A radio | MCA | |
| Europe | March 10, 1998 | CD | MCA | |
| United States | April 27, 1998 | Top 40 radio | MCA | |
| Japan | July 23, 1998 | CD | MCA | |
| United Kingdom | October 25, 1999 | CD; cassette | MCA | |

== See also ==
- Number one modern rock hits of 1998
