= Semisonic =

American rock band

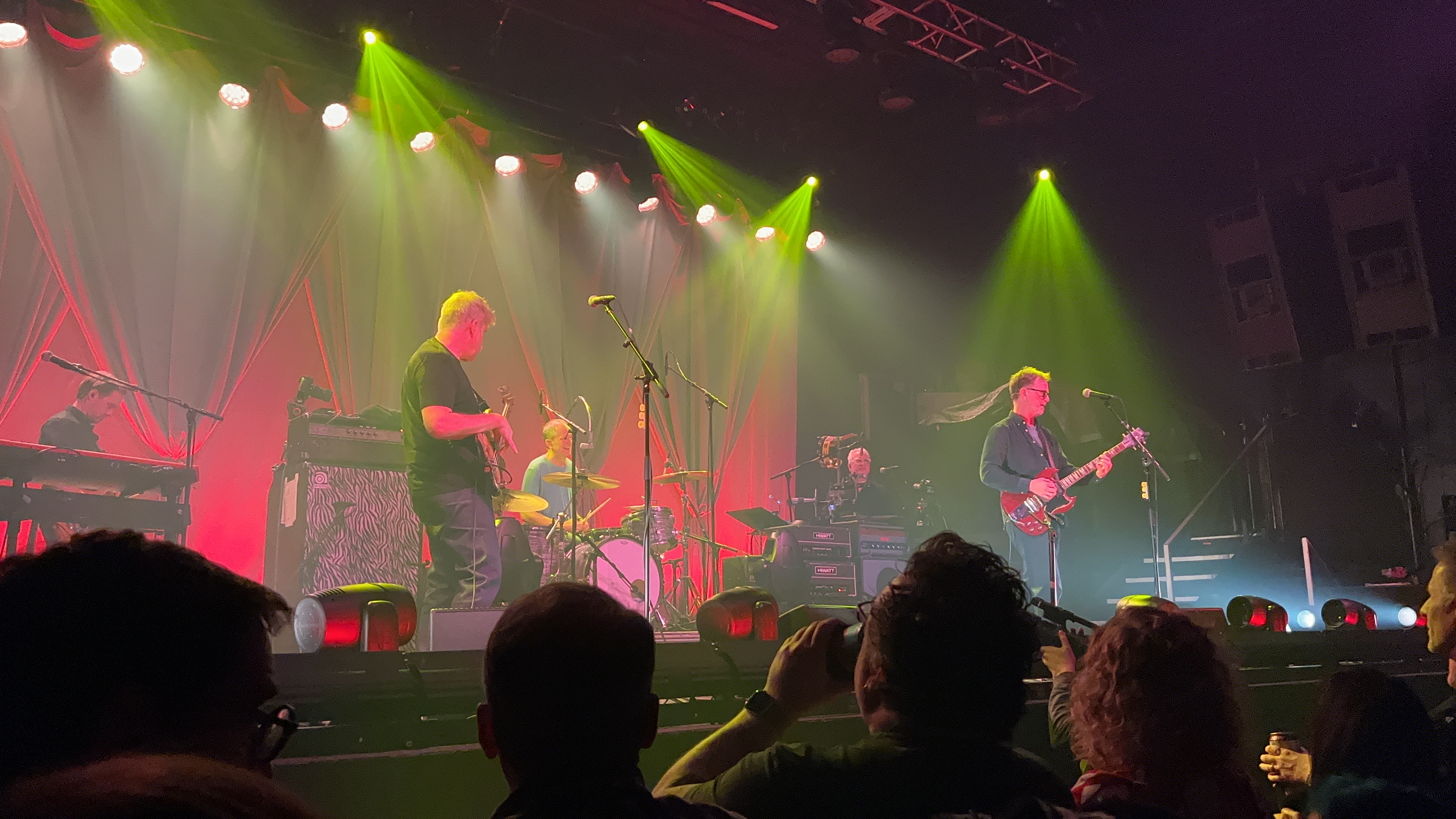
- Semisonic performing in 2023

Background information
- Also known as: Pleasure (1993–1995)
- Origin: Minneapolis, Minnesota, U.S.
- Genres: Alternative rock; pop rock; post-grunge; power pop
- Years active: 1993–2001; 2006; 2017–present
- Labels: CherryDisc; Elektra; MCA; Pleasuresonic
- Spinoff of: Trip Shakespeare
- Members: John Munson; Jacob Slichter; Dan Wilson
- Website: semisonic.com
- Logo
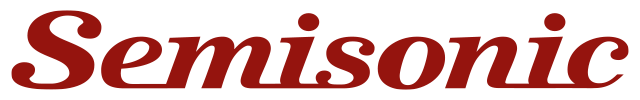

Semisonic is an American rock band formed in Minneapolis in 1993, consisting of Dan Wilson (lead vocals, guitar, keyboards), John Munson (bass, keyboards, backing vocals, guitar), and Jacob Slichter (drums, percussion, keyboards, backing vocals). They are best known in the U.S. for their 1998 top-20 single "Closing Time".

In 2025, Chad Childers of Loudwire included the band in his list of "10 '90s Post-Grunge Bands That Should Have Been Bigger".

== History ==
=== Formation and debut album ===
After the breakup of Trip Shakespeare, Wilson and Munson joined up with drummer Slichter to form the band Pleasure in 1993. By 1995, they had changed their name to Semisonic. An EP, Pleasure, was released that year on Boston indie label CherryDisc. Semisonic had signed a record contract with Elektra Records to record the Great Divide album. During recording, Bob Krasnow, the president of Elektra Records had quit, and in the changeover to a new president, the label dropped Semisonic. The band then signed with MCA Records, and finished recording the album. The studio full-length Great Divide was released in 1996 on MCA.

=== Breakthrough and international success ===
Semisonic's breakthrough came two years later in 1998 when their second album, Feeling Strangely Fine, reached the Top 50 chart on the strength of the hit single "Closing Time", their biggest hit in the United States. During a 2008 performance at Harvard's Sanders Theatre, Wilson said that it was originally written about the birth of his first child.

Their international career also blossomed when another song from the album, "Secret Smile", quickly became a UK radio favorite in the summer of 1999, eventually peaking at No. 12 on the UK Singles Chart.

=== Third album and hiatus ===
In early 2001, the band released its third album, All About Chemistry, The single "Chemistry" was a mainstay overseas; however the album did not fare as well in the United States. Another song, "Over My Head", was used in the 2001 teen flick Summer Catch, and Semisonic rode the wave touring various cities in and around the UK.

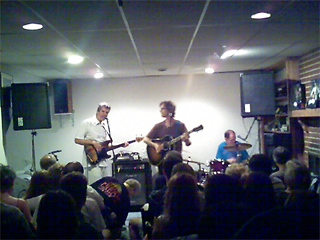
Semisonic performing in a 2006 basement concert. L-R: Munson, Wilson, and Slichter

Wilson had spoken about doing more Semisonic music in the future but said, "The busy day-to-day life keeps pushing it further into the future." All About Chemistry would be their last studio release until reconvening for the You're Not Alone EP which they put out in 2020.

=== 2017–2019 ===
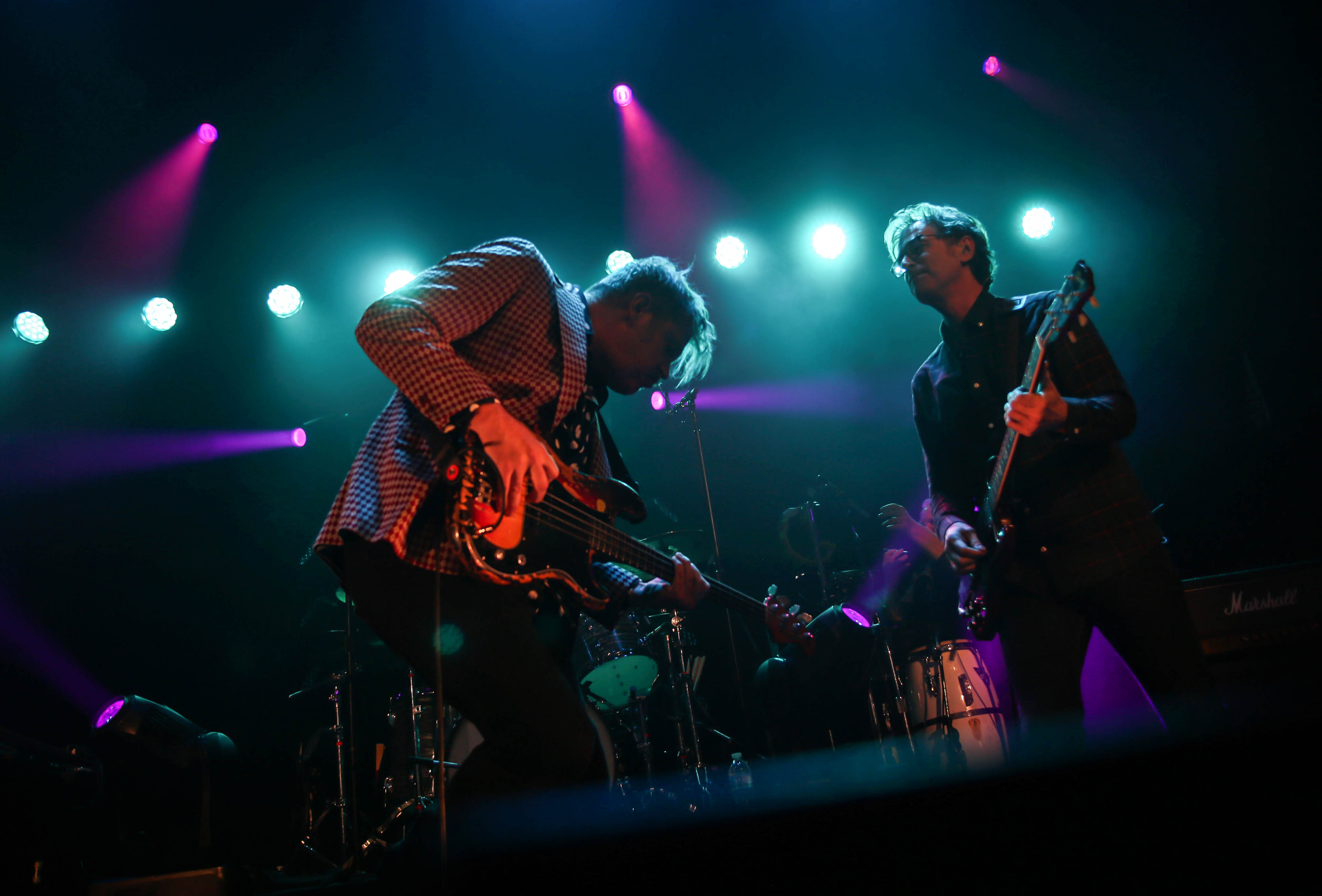
Munson and Wilson onstage with Semisonic in 2017

To commemorate the twentieth anniversary of their first album, Great Divide, the band reunited for a series of three shows in June 2017 – June 14 at a small club in St. Paul, and June 16–17 at First Avenue in Minneapolis. The band played Great Divide in its entirety.

In December 2017, the band played three more shows in the Twin Cities to commemorate the approaching 20th anniversary of their second album, Feeling Strangely Fine, performing the album in its entirety. In 2018, Feeling Strangely Fine was given a re-release for the album's twentieth anniversary, including its first vinyl pressing. The anniversary edition included four songs not on the original album: "Long Way from Home," "I'm a Liar," "Beautiful Regret," and "Makin' a Plan."

In July 2019, Semisonic performed at Summerfest in Milwaukee and then at the Basilica Block Party in Minneapolis. During their 2017–2019 shows, the band performed some new, previously unreleased songs, including "Basement Tapes," "All It Would Take," and "You're Not Alone."

=== First Avenue ===
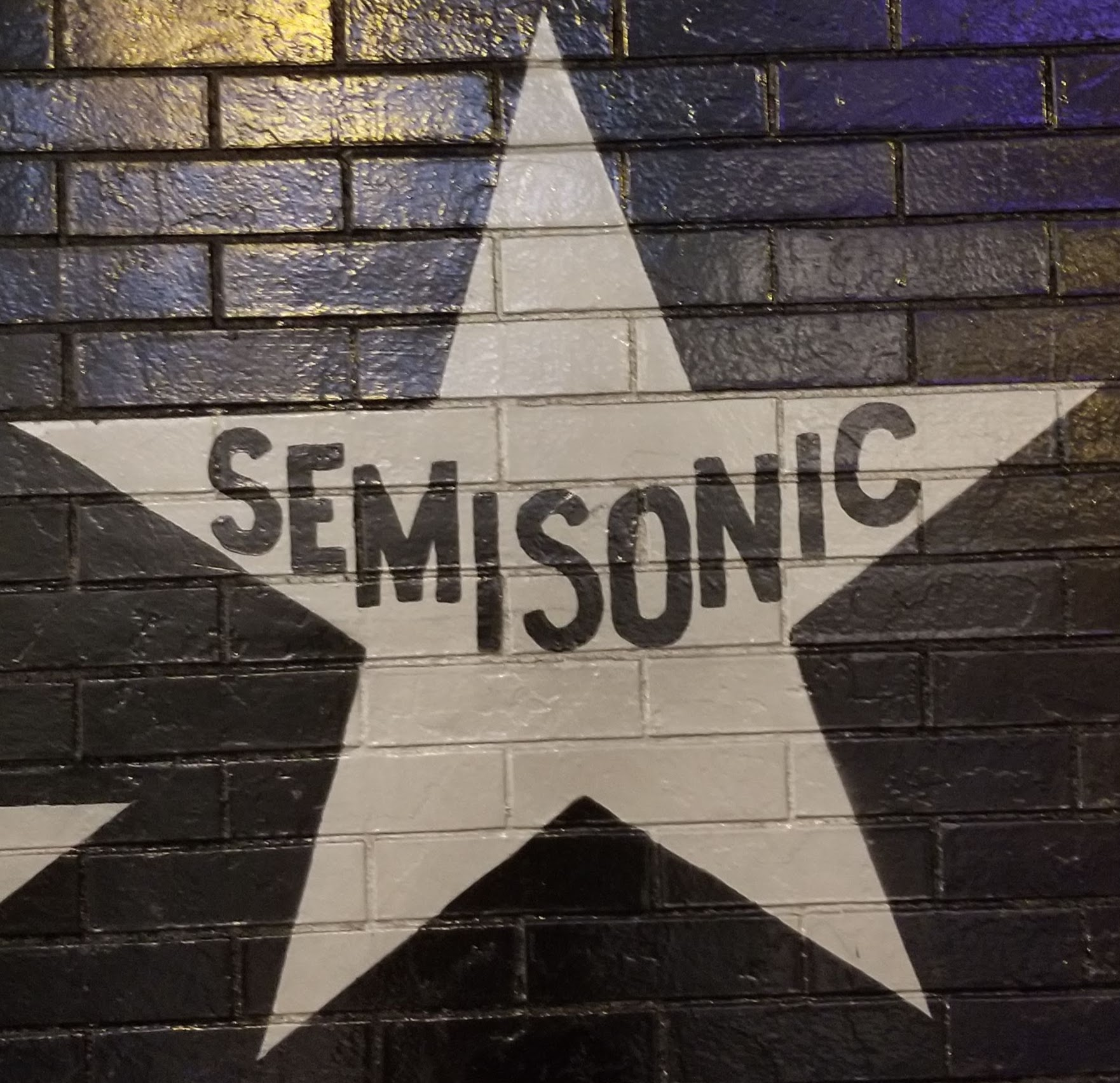
Semisonic's star on the outside mural of the Minneapolis nightclub First Avenue

The band has been honored with a star on the outside mural of the Minneapolis nightclub First Avenue, recognizing performers that have played sold-out shows or have otherwise demonstrated a major contribution to the culture at the iconic venue. Receiving a star "might be the most prestigious public honor an artist can receive in Minneapolis", according to journalist Steve Marsh. Wilson and Munson's previous group, Trip Shakespeare, also has a star making them among the few musicians with multiple stars on the mural.

=== 2020–present ===
On June 26, 2020, Semisonic released the single "You're Not Alone", their first new material in 19 years, and later released the full You're Not Alone EP on September 18, 2020.

On January 27 and 28, 2023, the band played two shows at First Avenue to celebrate the 18th anniversary of the shows’ sponsor, Twin Cities public radio station The Current.

Semisonic supported Barenaked Ladies from June 2, 2023 through June 26, 2023 on the Last Summer on Earth 2023 tour.

In the summer of 2023, the band also began releasing singles from its upcoming album, Little Bit of Sun. On June 5, Semisonic released the singles “Little Bit of Sun” and “Grow Your Own.” On August 1, another single, "The Rope," was released, along with a video for the song made by Phil Harder. On September 12, the band released “Out of the Dirt,” co-written by Lori McKenna and featuring Jason Isbell on guitar.

The full album of twelve songs, Little Bit of Sun, was released on November 3, 2023.

On June 17, 2026, Semisonic released the single "Don't Give Up Yet", a song influenced by Operation Metro Surge, an operation occurring in the band's hometown of Minneapolis from 2025 to 2026.

== Discography ==
=== Studio albums ===
List of studio albums, with selected details, chart positions and certifications
Year	Album details	Peak chart positions						Certifications (sales threshold)
Year	Album details	US	AUS	CAN	IRL	NZL	UK	Certifications (sales threshold)
Great Divide	Release date: April 9, 1996; Label: MCA	—	—	—	—	—	—	
Feeling Strangely Fine	Release date: March 24, 1998; Label: MCA	43	66	55	53	17	16	RIAA: Platinum; MC: Gold; BPI: Platinum
All About Chemistry	Release date: March 13, 2001; Label: MCA	103	—	—	28	—	13	
Little Bit of Sun	Release date: November 3, 2023; Label: Pleasuresonic	—	—	—	—	—	—	
"—" denotes releases that did not chart or was not released in that territory.

=== Live albums ===
- One Night at First Avenue (2003)

=== EPs ===
- Pleasure EP (1995)
- You're Not Alone (2020)

=== Singles ===
Title	Year	Peak chart positions										Certifications	Album
Title	Year	US Air.	US Alt	US Main	US AAA	AUS	CAN	IRL	NLD	NZL	UK	Certifications	Album
"Down in Flames"	1996	—	—	43	—	—	—	—	—	—	—		Great Divide
"If I Run"	1996	—	38	25	—	—	—	—	—	—	—		Great Divide
"F.N.T."	1996	—	35	30	—	—	—	—	—	—	—		Great Divide
"Closing Time"	1998	11	1	13	4	40	33	48	84	50	25	BPI: Platinum; RMNZ: 2× Platinum	Feeling Strangely Fine
"Singing in My Sleep"	1998	—	11	31	—	70	—	—	—	—	39		Feeling Strangely Fine
"Secret Smile"	1999	—	21	—	17	—	30	26	—	—	12	BPI: Silver	Feeling Strangely Fine
"Chemistry"	2001	—	39	—	6	—	—	39	84	21	35		All About Chemistry
"Get a Grip"	2001	—	—	—	—	—	—	—	—	—	109		All About Chemistry
"You're Not Alone"	2020	—	—	—	14	—	—	—	—	—	—		You're Not Alone EP
"Little Bit of Sun"/"Grow Your Own"	2023	—	—	—	—	—	—	—	—	—	—		Little Bit of Sun
"The Rope"	2023	—	—	—	—	—	—	—	—	—	—		Little Bit of Sun
"Out of the Dirt"	2023	—	—	—	—	—	—	—	—	—	—		Little Bit of Sun
"Don't Give Up Yet"	2026	—	—	—	—	—	—	—	—	—	—		
"—" denotes releases that did not chart, or were not released in this territory.

=== Soundtracks and compilations ===
- Semisonic performed "Sugar, Sugar" with Mary Lou Lord on the 1995 tribute album Saturday Morning: Cartoons' Greatest Hits, produced by Ralph Sall for MCA Records.
- Semisonic contributed the title song for the 1999 Kevin Costner movie For Love of the Game.
- Multiple Semisonic songs were featured in episodes of the television sitcom Friends, with "Delicious" and "Closing Time" later being featured in the soundtrack albums Friends Again and Friends: The Ultimate Soundtrack respectively.
- "Over My Head", a bonus track on some editions of All About Chemistry, was used in the 2001 teen flick Summer Catch.
- "Closing Time" appeared in the 2011 movie Friends with Benefits.
- In the fall of 2001, Semisonic contributed their cover of the Wings song, "Jet", for the Paul McCartney tribute CD Listen to What the Man Said.
- Wilson with Bic Runga contributed "Good Morning Baby" to the American Pie soundtrack in 1999.
- "F.N.T." was featured in the 1996 movie The Long Kiss Goodnight and the 1999 movie 10 Things I Hate About You.
- "Closing Time" was included in an episode of The Office. It was also featured in the season finale of The Real World: Seattle.
- "Closing Time" is referenced in the Weird Al Yankovic montage "Polka Party!" in his 1999 groundbreaking album Running With Scissors.

== Other projects by members ==
Wilson took time out to do some solo projects and play tour dates around the Midwest in December. Munson joined Wilson's brother and former Trip Shakespeare frontman Matt Wilson to form a side project, The Flops, in 2001, though they were expected to make a final performance in early 2005. In 2009, John Munson and Matt Wilson reunited to form a new band The Twilight Hours. They have released two albums, Stereo Night (2009) and Black Beauty (2016), and have been touring.

In 2004, Slichter's book So You Wanna Be a Rock & Roll Star was published, detailing some of the experiences the group had while touring and attempting to get airplay on radio stations across the US.

In late spring of 2005, John Munson began playing in a new jazz trio, The New Standards, featuring Chan Poling of The Suburbs and Steve Roehm. This band plays new jazz renditions of "classic" songs.

In October 2007, Rick Rubin's label American Recordings released Wilson's solo album, Free Life, featuring collaborations with numerous artists including Munson and Slichter. The song "Cry" was the album's single.
