= John Munson =

American musician (born 1966)

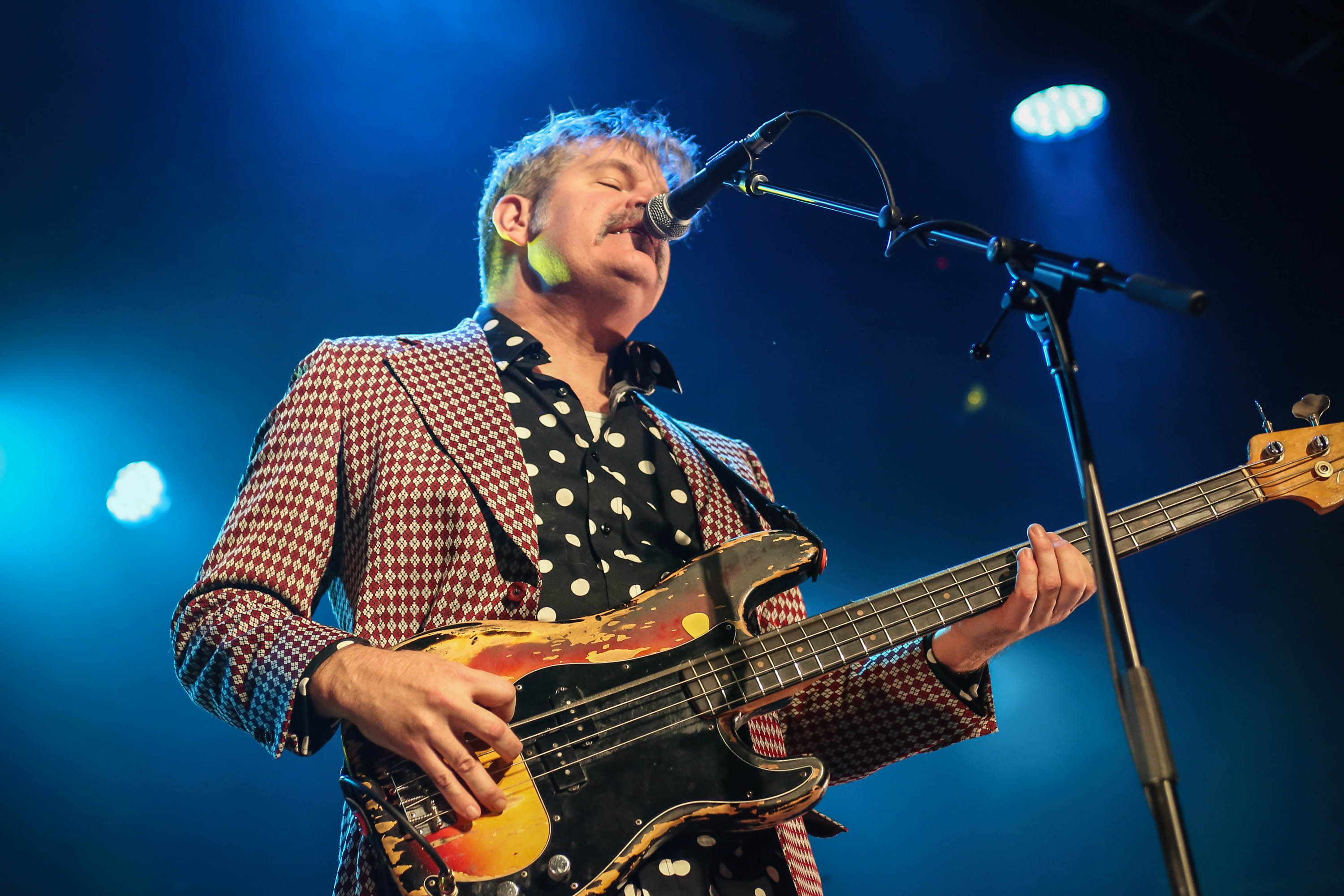
- Munson performing with Semisonic in 2023

Background information
- Born: December 13, 1966 (age 59)
- Instruments: Bass guitar, piano, guitar, double bass
- Member of: Semisonic, The New Standards
- Formerly of: Trip Shakespeare, The Flops, The Twilight Hours

John Munson (born December 13, 1966) is an American musician who is best known as the bass player for Semisonic. He was also a member of Trip Shakespeare during the late 1980s and early 1990s.

== Trip Shakespeare ==
Matt Wilson, lead vocalist of Trip Shakespeare, recalled how Munson joined that band in 1985:

Back in Minneapolis, we started trying out bass players. John is somebody that I'd played with in a band a few years earlier, so we already knew each other. But John was not that good of a bass player when I had known him before, so it didn't really occur to me to try him out. But he came over anyway and played, and he'd improved a lot. And I don't believe it's because he kept active, either. I don't know what it is. He's not a major practicer.

== Semisonic ==
When Trip Shakespeare dissolved, Munson and fellow band member Dan Wilson—Matt's brother—formed a new band called Pleasure with Jacob Slichter, which later became Semisonic.

== Current projects ==
Currently Munson is working on several different projects, including working with former Trip Shakespeare mate Matt Wilson on new songs as The Flops and later The Twilight Hours, and also on the New Standards, a band that plays covers of a wide variety of music in a jazz format. Other members of the New Standards include Chan Poling (formerly of Minneapolis dance pop band The Suburbs) and Steve Roehm. Munson has also provided music and commentary for the program Wits on Minnesota Public Radio. While performing on Wits, Munson's back-up band was called the Witnesses and its members were as follows: Janey Winterbauer on vocals, Steve Roehm on vibes, Richard Medek on drums, and Joe Savage on pedal steel.

In 2017, Munson produced Minneapolis songwriter and novelist Dylan Hicks' album Ad Out. He reteamed with Hicks in 2020 in the duo Munson-Hicks Party Supplies. Originally intending to write a musical together, their collaboration turned instead for inspiration to the 1970 album Nilsson Sings Newman by Randy Newman and Harry Nilsson. The duo's debut, the self-titled Munson-Hicks Party Supplies, was released in 2020. Star Tribune music critic Chris Riemenschneider called it "one of the most charming albums of the year".
