= Jacob Slichter =

American musician (born 1961)

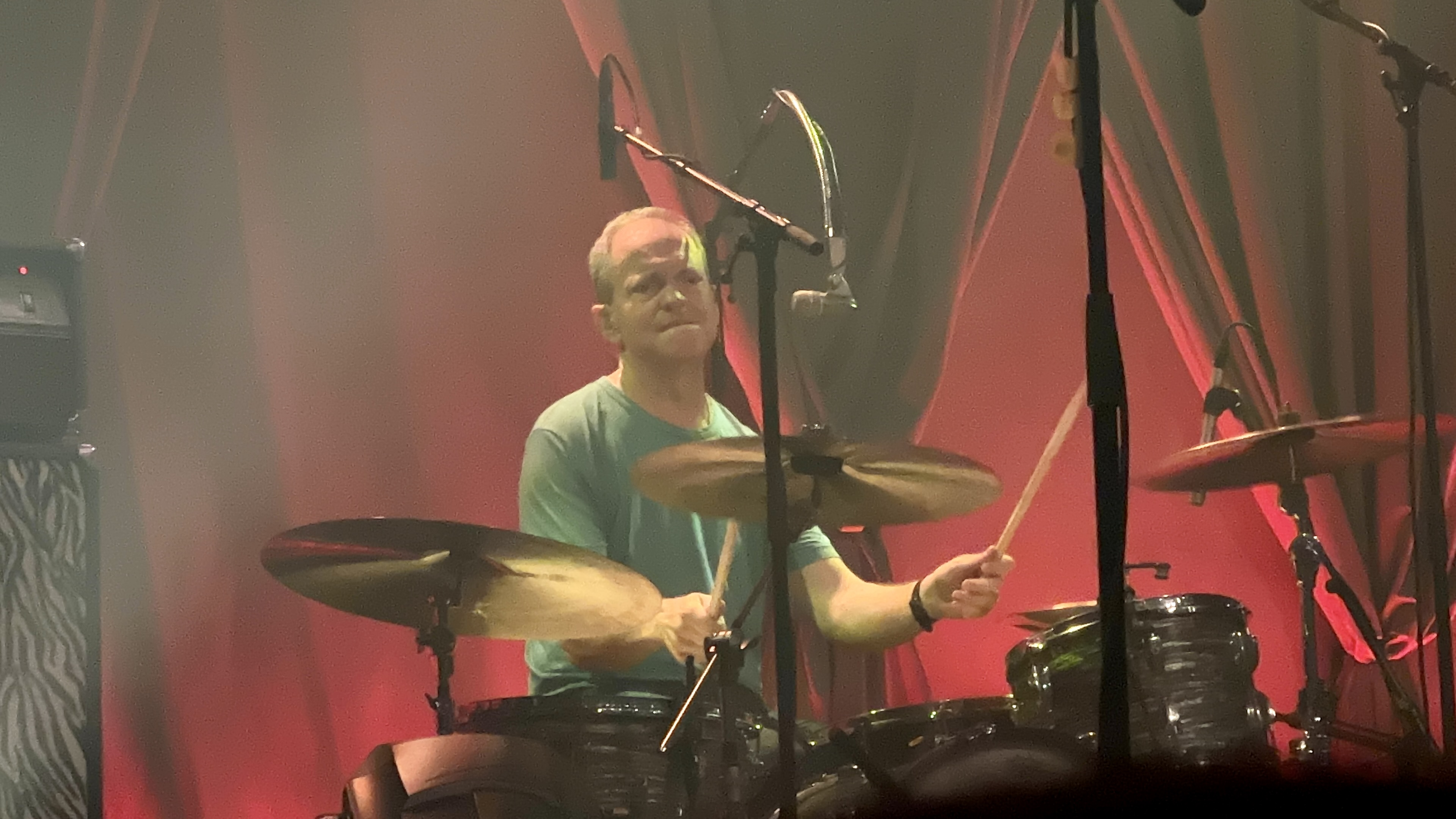
- Slichter performing with Semisonic in 2023

Background information
- Born: Jacob Huber Slichter; April 5, 1961 (age 65); Boston, Massachusetts
- Genres: Alternative rock
- Occupations: Musician, professor at Sarah Lawrence College
- Instruments: Drums, piano
- Years active: 1993–present
- Label: MCA
- Member of: Semisonic

Jacob Slichter (born Jacob Huber Slichter, April 5, 1961) is an American musician and academic, best known as the drummer for the rock band Semisonic.

== Early life ==
Slichter, the son of physicist Charles Slichter, was born in Boston, Massachusetts. He graduated from Harvard with a degree in African American studies and history.

== Career ==
Slichter, in 2004, wrote So You Wanna Be a Rock & Roll Star (ISBN 0-7679-1470-8), a book that details his experiences as a member of Semisonic and their journey through the recording industry. Kirkus Reviews wrote that "few first-person memoirs of the rock biz are as smart, honest, and entertaining as this tart, incisive work."

In 2006, Slichter said that payola was how his band Semisonic turned their song "Closing Time" into a hit. Slichter stated: "It cost something close to $700,000 to $800,000 to get 'Closing Time' on the air."
