= Babes in Toyland discography =

American punk band

Babes in Toyland (band) discography
- Studio albums: 3
- EPs: 2
- Live albums: 1
- Compilation albums: 5
- Singles: 7
- Music videos: 7

Babes in Toyland was an American punk rock band formed in Minneapolis, Minnesota, in 1987. The band was formed by Oregon native Kat Bjelland (lead vocals and guitar), with Lori Barbero (drums) and Michelle Leon (bass), who was later replaced by Maureen Herman in 1992. Courtney Love had a brief stint in the band in 1987 as a bass player before being kicked out and forming Hole in 1989.

Between 1989 and 1995, Babes in Toyland released three studio albums: Spanking Machine (1990), the commercially successful Fontanelle (1992), and Nemesisters (1995), before becoming inactive in 1997 and eventually disbanding in 2001. While the band was inspirational to some performers in the riot grrrl movement in the Pacific Northwest, Babes in Toyland never associated themselves with the movement.

== Studio albums ==
Year	Title	Label	US sales
1990	Spanking Machine	Twin Tone Records	70,000
1992	Fontanelle	Reprise Records	220,000
1995	Nemesisters	Reprise Records	150,000

== Extended plays ==
Year	Title	Label	US sales
1991	To Mother	Southern Records	50,000
1993	Painkillers	Southern Records	60,000

== Live albums ==
Year	Title	Type
2001	Minneapolism	Cherry Red Records

== Compilation albums ==
Year	Title	Type
1992	The Peel Sessions	Strange Fruit Records
1994	Dystopia	Insipid Records
2000	Lived	Almafame
2000	Devil	Almafame
2000	Viled	Almafame
2000	Natural Babe Killers	Recall Records
2001	Collector's Item	Digimode Entertainment
2001	The Further Adventures of Babes in Toyland	Fuel 2000 Records
2004	The Best of Babes in Toyland and Kat Bjelland	Warner Music Records

== Singles ==
Year	Title	Album	Label
1989	Dust Cake Boy	Spanking Machine	Treehouse Records
1990	House	(None)	Sub Pop
1991	Handsome and Gretel	Fontanelle	Insipid Records
1992	Bruise Violet	Fontanelle	Southern Records
1993	Catatonic	To Mother	Insipid Records
1995	Sweet '69	Nemesisters	Reprise Records
1995	We Are Family	Nemesisters	Reprise Records

== Chart positions ==
Year	Single	Chart	Peak position
1990	Spanking Machine	US CMJ College Chart Top 150	32
1991	To Mother	UK Indie Chart	1
1992	Fontanelle	UK Albums Chart	24
1993	Painkillers	UK Albums Chart	53
1995	"Sweet '69"	US Billboard Modern Rock Tracks	37
1995	"Sweet '69"	UK Singles Chart	173
1995	"We Are Family"	US Billboard Hot Dance Music/Club Play	22
1995	Nemesisters	US CMJ College Chart Top 150	7

== Other contributions ==
Year	Title	Album	Label
1989	"Watching Girl"	Every Band Has a Shonen Knife Who Loves Them	Giant Records
1991	"Handsome & Gretel"	Indie Top 20 Volume 13	Beechwood Music
1991	"Ripe"	New Season – The Peel Sessions	Strange Fruit
1991	"Flesh Crawl"	Teriyaki Asthma Vols. I-V	C/Z Records
1991	House	The Grunge Years	Sub Pop Records
1992	Handsome & Gretel	Best of Independent	Beechwood Music
1992	Sometimes	Volume 4	Volmume
1993	Dirty	Milk for Pussy	Mad Queen Records
1993	Dust Cake Boy	Sonic Youth in 1991: The Year Punk Broke (VHS)	Geffen Home Video
1994	Calling Occupants of Interplanetary Craft	If I Were a Carpenter	A&M Records
1994	Say What You Want	S.F.W.	A&M Records
1995	Sweet '69	Alternative Final Mix 11	Warner Music
1995	More, More, More	Spirit Of '73: Rock For Choice	550 Music
1995	Sweet '69	Triple J: This Is Twelve – Too Louder Compilation	Australian Broadcasting Corporation
1996	Handsome & Gretel (Live)	Volume Fourteen – Reading '95 Special	Volume
1998	Overtura: Astroantiquity	Songs of the Witchblade	DreamWorks

== Videography ==
The best places to catch a Babes in Toyland video in the US were through various MTV outlets. The music videos for "Bruise Violet" and "Sweet '69" were Buzzworthy Clip Features, and "Sweet '69" was the cheapest video ever made to be played on the network at the time. The "Sweet '69" music video was made on a $5,000 budget. Beavis and Butthead episodes were another notable place to catch clips for "Ripe" and "Bruise Violet''. 120 minutes also played music videos by the band. They also guest-hosted the show on July 9, 1995.

=== Music videos ===
Year	Title
1990	He's My Thing (from Spanking Machine)
1991	Ripe (from To Mother)
1992	Bruise Violet (from Fontanelle)
1992	Won't Tell (from Fontanelle)
1993	Istigkeit (from Painkillers)
1995	Sweet '69 (from Nemesisters)
1995	We Are Family (from Nemesisters)

=== Other videography ===
Year	Title
1990	The Making of Spanking Machine
1991	"Dust Cake Boy" from 1991: The Year Punk Broke
1993	MTV's Beavis and Butthead "Ripe"
1993	MTV's Beavis and Butthead "Bruise Violet"
1993	The Making of Painkillers
1995	The Making of Nemesisters
1995	Babes in Toyland "Nemesisters" EPK
1995	Babes in Toyland host MTV's 120 Minutes
1995	Performance of "Sweet '69" on MTV's 120 Minutes
1995	Performance of "Memory" on MTV's 120 Minutes
