= Viled =

2000 compilation album by Babes in Toyland

Compilation album by Babes in Toyland
- Released: May 2000
- Recorded: Various
- Genre: Punk rock, alternative rock
- Length: 51:54
- Label: Alamfame
- Producer: Tim Mac

Babes in Toyland chronology
Devil (2000)	Viled (2000)	Minneapolism (2001)

Viled is the third compilation of the trilogy released by Babes in Toyland. The previous two were Lived and Devil. Viled was produced by Tim Mac, and released May 2000 by Almafame.

== Track listing ==
All songs by Babes in Toyland (except Tracks 16 and 17)

1. Swamp Pussy (demo)
2. House (Subpop Single Club Single)
3. Arriba (House's B-side)
4. Flesh Crawl (Compilation Contribution)
5. Dirty (Compilation Contribution)
6. Watching Girl (Compilation Contribution)
7. Handsome and Gretel (demo)/Single
8. Pearl (demo)/"Handsome and Gretel" Single B-side
9. Blood (recorded at Amsterdam Melkweg; July 8, 1994)
10. Sometimes (demo)/Angel Hair
11. Hello (demo)
12. Sweet 69 (demo)
13. Eye Rise (demo)/Ariel
14. 22 (recorded at Amsterdam Melkweg; July 8, 1994)
15. Peek-A-Boo Street (Nemesisters outtake)
16. We Are Family (demo)
17. The Girl Can't Help It (demo)/(compilation Contribution)
18. Astroantiquity (demo)

== Trivia ==
- The official version of The Girl Can't Help It is on Fast Track to Nowhere: Songs from "Rebel Highway" and Astroaniquity is on Witchblade
- "Flesh Crawl" is on "Teriyaki Asthma Vols. I-V"
- "Dirty" is on "Milk for Pussy"
- "Watching Girl" is on "Every Band Has A Shonen Knife Who Loves Them"

== Personnel ==
- Kat Bjelland - Guitar, vocals
- Lori Barbero - drums, vocals on Tracks 6 and 16
- Maureen Herman - Bass on Tracks 5 and 9–18
- Michelle Leon - Bass on Tracks 1–4, 6, 7, and 8
