= The Best of Babes in Toyland and Kat Bjelland =

2004 compilation album by Babes in Toyland and Kat Bjelland

The Best of Babes In Toyland and Kat Bjelland

Greatest hits album by Babes in Toyland
- Released: November 29, 2004
- Recorded: 1985–2004
- Genre: Alternative rock, punk rock
- Label: WEA International

Babes in Toyland chronology
Minneapolism (2001)	The Best of Babes In Toyland and Kat Bjelland (2004)

The Best of Babes In Toyland and Kat Bjelland is a CD/DVD compilation featuring songs by Babes in Toyland and Kat Bjelland's other projects, including her work in Crunt, Katastrophy Wife, and Pagan Babies. It was released in 2004 by WEA International in the United Kingdom.

== Track listing ==
All tracks are written by Kat Bjelland unless otherwise noted.

No.	Title	Writer(s)	Length
1.	"Introduction: Dr. Timothy Leary"		0:27
2.	"Dust Cake Boy"		3:29
3.	"Vomit Heart"		2:48
4.	"Spit to See the Shine"		2:42
5.	"Right Now"		2:19
6.	"Handsome & Gretel"		1:50
7.	"Bruise Violet"		2:53
8.	"He's My Thing"		2:52
9.	"Istigkeit"		4:22
10.	"Sweet '69"		4:03
11.	"Ariel"		4:23
12.	"Oh Yeah!"		2:43
13.	"S.F.W."		3:58
14.	"Mater Dolorosa"		3:59
15.	"Introduction: Kat and Joan Jett"		0:32
16.	"Quiet Room"	Bjelland, Courtney Love	1:55
17.	"Ice Cream & Cigarettes"		2:18
18.	"Unglued"		3:37
19.	"Git Go"		3:03
20.	"Rosacea"		5:26
21.	"Busiest Shopping Day of the Year"		3:42
22.	"Money Shot"		2:59
23.	"Sweetheart"		2:40
24.	"Liberty Belle"		2:43
25.	"Blue Valient"		3:58

Notes

- Tracks 2-14 performed by Babes in Toyland
- Track 16 performed by Pagan Babies
- Track 17 performed by The Italian Whorenuns
- Track 18 performed by Crunt
- Tracks 19-26 performed by Katastrophy Wife

== DVD track listing ==
1. Spanking Machine (Making of)
2. Painkillers (Making of)
3. Nemesisters (Making of)
4. He's My Thing (Music Video)
5. Ripe (Music Video)
6. Bruise Violet (Music Video)
7. Won't Tell (Music Video)
8. Sweet '69 (Music Video)
9. Liberty Belle (Live)
10. Bonus Material (Early footage of Kat Bjelland, live performances, and Crunt music videos)

== Personnel ==
- Kat Bjelland - guitar, vocals; bass on "Unglued"
- Lori Barbero - drums on Tracks 2–14
- Maureen Herman - bass Tracks 5–14
- Michelle Leon - bass on Tracks 2–4
- Courtney Love - vocals on Track 16
- Janis Tanaka - bass on Tracks 16 & 17
- Deirdre Schletter - piano on Track 16, drums on Track 17
- Stu Spasm - guitar on Track 18
- Russell Simins - drums on Track 18
- Glen Mattson - drums on Tracks 19–22
- Darren Donovan - drums on Tracks 22–26
- Andrew Parker - bass on Tracks 22–26
