= The BBC John Peel Sessions, 1990–1992 =

Compilation album by Babes in Toyland
- Released: 2001
- Recorded: Tracks 1–8 Sep 9, 1990–Jun 11, 1991, Tracks 9–16 1992 at BBC Radio 1 Studios
- Genre: Grunge/Punk rock/Riot Grrrl/Alternative rock
- Label: Strange Fruit/Dutch East India Records and Cherry Red Records
- Producer: James Birt Whistle and Ted de Bono

Babes in Toyland chronology
Minneapolism (2001)	The BBC John Peel Sessions, 1990–1992 (2001)	The Best of Babes In Toyland and Kat Bjelland (2004)

Professional ratings
Review scores
Source	Rating
AllMusic	2.5/5 stars

The BBC John Peel Sessions, 1990–1992 is an expanded version of the earlier release, The Peel Sessions by Babes in Toyland. It was produced by James Birt Whistle and released on 27 November 2001 by Cherry Red Records, which was also responsible for releasing Babes In Toyland's first live album, Minneapolism.

== Track listing ==
1. "Catatonic" - 2:53
2. "Ripe" - 3:36
3. "Primus" - 3:58
4. "Spit to See the Shine" - 2:40
5. "Pearl" - 2:03
6. "Dogg" - 5:11
7. "Laugh My Head Off" - 3:30
8. "Mad Pilot" - 2:50
9. "Handsome and Gretel" - 1:55
10. "Blood" - 3:05
11. "Mother" - 3:31
12. "Dirty" - 2:23
13. "Jungle Train" - 2:36
14. "Right Now" - 2:25
15. "Sometimes" - 3:43
16. "Magic Flute" - 3:20

== Personnel ==
- Kat Bjelland - Guitar, vocals
- Lori Barbero - drums, vocals on "Primus","Dogg", and "Magic Flute"
- Michelle Leon - Bass on tracks 1–12
- Maureen Herman - Bass on Tracks 13–16
