= Dystopia (Babes in Toyland album) =

1994 compilation album by Babes in Toyland

Compilation album by Babes in Toyland
- Released: 1994
- Recorded: Tracks 1–11 recorded at Reciprocal Studio, Seattle USA, Tracks 12–18 recorded at Southern Studios, London UK, Tracks 19–20 recorded at 6 Feet Under
- Genre: Alternative rock, grunge, punk rock
- Length: 62:38
- Label: Insipid
- Producer: Tracks 1–11: Jack Endino, Tracks 12–18: John Loder, Tracks 19–20: Tim Mac

Babes in Toyland chronology
Painkillers (1993)	Dystopia (1994)	Nemesisters (1995)

Professional ratings
Review scores
Source	Rating
Allmusic	2/5 stars

Dystopia is a compilation album consisting of earlier albums, Spanking Machine, To Mother, and the Handsome & Gretel single recorded by Babes in Toyland. It was released in 1994 by Insipid Records.

== Track listing ==
All song by Babes in Toyland

1. "Swamp Pussy" - 2:24
2. "He's My Thing" - 2:56
3. "Vomit Heart" - 2:49
4. "Never" - 3:16
5. "Boto (W) Rap" - 2:31
6. "Dogg" - 3:53
7. "Pain in my Heart" - 3:59
8. "Lashes" - 3:46
9. "You're Right" - 3:07
10. "Dust Cake Boy"* - 3:31
11. "Fork Down Throat" - 3:54
12. "Catatonic"* - 2:50
13. "Mad Pilot" - 2:51
14. "Primus" - 4:00
15. "Laugh My Head Off" - 3:34
16. "Spit to See the Shine" - 2:45
17. "Ripe" - 3:39
18. "Quiet Room" - 2:38
19. "Handsome and Gretel"* - 2:01
20. "Pearl" - 1:56

== Personnel ==
- Kat Bjelland - Guitar, vocals
- Lori Barbero - Drums, vocals on "Dogg" and "Primus"
- Michelle Leon - Bass
