= Devil (Babes in Toyland album) =

2000 compilation album by Babes in Toyland

Compilation album by Babes in Toyland
- Released: May 2000
- Recorded: Various
- Genre: Punk rock, alternative rock
- Length: 49:20
- Label: Alamfame
- Producer: Tim Mac

Babes in Toyland chronology
Natural Babe Killers (2000)	Devil (2000)	Viled (2000)

Professional ratings
Review scores
Source	Rating
AllMusic	2.5/5 stars
The Encyclopedia of Popular Music	2/5 stars

Devil is the second compilation of the trilogy released by Babes in Toyland. It was produced by Tim Mac, and released May 2000 by Almafame.

== Track listing ==
All songs by Babes in Toyland (except Tracks 13, 14 and 15)

1. "Oh Yeah" (recorded at Reading Festival; 1995)
2. "Spun" (recorded at Lollapolooza San Francisco; June 22, 1993)
3. "Bruise Violet" (recorded at Lollapolooza San Francisco; June 22, 1993)
4. "Primus" (recorded at Utrecht, Netherlands)
5. "Fake Fur Condom" (recorded at Paisley Park Minneapolis; September 16, 1992)
6. "Won't Tell" (recorded at Lollapolooza San Francisco; June 22, 1993)
7. "Magic Flute" (recorded at Amsterdam Melkweg; September 16, 1992)
8. "S.F.W." (recorded at Amsterdam Melkweg; July 8, 1994)
9. "Jungle Train" (recorded at Amsterdam Melkweg; July 8, 1994)
10. "Knife Song" (recorded at Minneapolis 7th Street Entry; February 25, 1988)
11. "Flesh Crawl" (recorded at Minneapolis 7th Street Entry; February 25, 1988)
12. "Intermenstral" (recorded at Minneapolis 7th Street Entry; February 25, 1988)
13. "We Are Family" (recorded at Reading Festival; 1995)
14. "More, More, More" (demo)
15. "Calling Occupants of Interplanetary Craft" (demo)
- Multimedia

16. Babes in Toyland Photo Album

== Trivia ==
- The official version of More, More, More is on Spirit of '73: Rock for Choice and Calling Occupants Of Interplanetary Craft is on If I Were a Carpenter

== Personnel ==
- Kat Bjelland - Guitar, vocals
- Lori Barbero - drums, vocals on Tracks 4 and 13
- Maureen Herman - Bass on Tracks 1–9, 13, 14, and 15
- Michelle Leon - Bass on Tracks 10, 11, and 12
