= Painkillers (EP) =

1993 EP by Babes in Toyland

EP by Babes in Toyland
- Released: June 22, 1993
- Recorded: 1992
- Studios: Pachyderm, Cannon Falls, Minnesota; CBGB, New York City, New York
- Genres: Alternative rock; punk rock
- Length: 50:44
- Labels: Reprise, Southern Records (UK)
- Producers: Jack Endino; Kat Bjelland; Lee Ranaldo; Lori Barbero

Babes in Toyland chronology
Fontanelle (1992)	Painkillers (1993)	Dystopia (1994)

Professional ratings
Review scores
Source	Rating
AllMusic	2.5/5 stars
Entertainment Weekly	A−
Kerrang!	3/5 stars
NME	7/10
Spin Alternative Record Guide	4/10

Painkillers is the second EP by American alternative rock band Babes in Toyland, released in June 1993. It consists of outtakes from their second studio album, Fontanelle (1992), as well as a 34-minute single-track live recording of the band's April 1992 performance at CBGB in New York City.

== Track listing ==
All tracks are written by Kat Bjelland, except where noted.

No.	Title	Writer(s)	Length
1.	"He's My Thing"		2:51
2.	"Laredo"		2:37
3.	"Istigkeit"		4:21
4.	"Ragweed"	Lee Ranaldo	3:09
5.	"Angel Hair"		3:42
6.	"Fontanellette" (live)	Bjelland; Lori Barbero; Maureen Herman	34:04
Total length:			50:44

== Personnel ==
Musicians

- Kat Bjelland – vocals, guitar
- Maureen Herman – bass
- Lori Barbero – drums, vocals (4)

Technical

- Jack Endino – production (1, 3, 4, 5)
- Kat Bjelland – production (1–3, 6)
- Lee Ranaldo – production (2, 5)
- Lori Barbero – production (4)

== Charts ==
Chart	Peak position
UK Albums Chart	53
