= Sweet '69 =

1994 single by Babes in Toyland

Single by Babes in Toyland

from the album Nemesisters
- B-side: "S.F.W."; "Swamp Pussy"
- Released: 1995
- Recorded: 1994
- Genre: Garage punk • noise rock
- Length: 4:03
- Label: Reprise
- Songwriter: Babes in Toyland
- Producer: Tim Mac

Babes in Toyland singles chronology
"Catatonic" (1993)	"Sweet '69" (1995)	"We Are Family" (1995)

"Sweet '69" is a song by Babes in Toyland, released in 1995. B-sides, "S.F.W." and "Swamp Pussy", are live recordings from the Danish Roskilde Festival in 1994 by Radiomafia. "Sweet '69" is the first single by Babes in Toyland to get a lot of radio airplay in the US, reaching #37 on the Billboard Modern Rock chart. The single also peaked at #173 on the UK's Official Singles Chart. The song is unique in its extensive use of melodic cowbells by drummer Lori Barbero. An accompanying video was also released.

== Track listing ==
1. "Sweet '69"
2. "S.F.W."
3. "Swamp Pussy"

== Personnel ==
- Kat Bjelland - Guitar and vocals
- Lori Barbero - Drums, percussion
- Maureen Herman - Bass

== Charts ==
Chart (1995)	Peak position
U.S. Billboard Hot Modern Rock Tracks	37
