= Lived (album) =

2000 compilation album by Babes in Toyland

Compilation album by Babes in Toyland
- Released: May 2000
- Recorded: Various
- Genre: Punk rock, alternative rock
- Length: 51:24
- Label: Alamfame
- Producer: Tim Mac

Babes in Toyland chronology
Nemesisters (1995)	Lived (2000)	Natural Babe Killers (2000)

Professional ratings
Review scores
Source	Rating
Allmusic	3/5 stars

Lived is the first compilation of the trilogy released by Babes in Toyland. It was produced by Tim Mac, and released May 2000 by Almafame.

== Track listing ==
All songs by Babes in Toyland (except Tracks 1, 12, and 13)

1. Introduction: Dr. Timothy Leary (recorded at Lollapolooza San Francisco; June 22, 1993)
2. "He's My Thing" (recorded at Chicago Metro; May 17, 1991)
3. "Handsome and Gretel" (recorded at Lollapalooza San Francisco; June 22, 1993)
4. "Bluebell" (recorded at Lollapalooza San Francisco; June 22, 1993)
5. "Sweet 69" (recorded at Minneapolis 1st Avenue; January 7, 1995)
6. "Ripe" (recorded at Utrecht, Holland; December 19, 1990)
7. "Mad Pilot" (recorded at TJ's Newport; December 18, 1991)
8. "Right Now" (recorded at Lollapalooza San Francisco; June 22, 1993)
9. "Dogg" (recorded at Chicago Metro; May 17, 1991)
10. "Fork Down Throat" (recorded at Minneapolis 7th Street Entry; February 25, 1988)
11. "Ya Know That Guy" (recorded at Minneapolis 7th Street Entry; February 25, 1988)
12. "Bubble, Bubble, Toil & Trouble"
13. "Fair Is Foul & Foul Is Fair"
14. "Big Top"
- Multimedia on disc

15. "Astroantiquity" (recorded at Mill City Music Festival; January 9, 1997)
16. "Bruise Violet" (recorded at Mill City Music Festival; January 9, 1997)
17. "Memory" (recorded at Mill City Music Festival; January 9, 1997)

"Bubble, Bubble, Toil & Trouble" and "Fair Is Foul & Foul Is Fair" are Babes in Toyland singing the Three Witches parts in Shakespeare's Macbeth.

== Personnel ==
- Kat Bjelland - Guitar, vocals
- Lori Barbero - drums, vocals
- Maureen Herman - Bass on Tracks 3, 4, 5, 7, 8, 9, 13, and 14
- Michelle Leon - Bass on Tracks 2, 6, 10, 11, 12
