= House (Babes in Toyland song) =

1990 single by Babes in Toyland

Single by Babes in Toyland
- B-side: "Arriba"
- Released: May 1, 1990
- Recorded: 1989
- Studio: Seattle, Washington
- Genre: Punk rock; alternative rock
- Length: 3:35
- Label: Sub Pop
- Songwriter(s): Kat Bjelland
- Producer(s): Jack Endino

Babes in Toyland singles chronology
"Dust Cake Boy" (1989)	"House" (1990)	"Handsome and Gretel" (1991)

"House" is the second single by American punk band Babes in Toyland. Released by Sub Pop Records and limited to 3,500 copies, 1,500 were released on black vinyl for the Sub Pop Singles Club, and the remaining 2,000 on special gold (yellow) vinyl. This is the band's first non-album single. It features the b-side "Arriba."

== Track listing ==
All tracks are written by Babes in Toyland

No.	Title	Length
1.	"House"	3:35
2.	"Arriba"	2:34
Total length:		6:09

== Personnel ==
Musicians

- Kat Bjelland – vocals, guitar
- Michelle Leon – bass
- Lori Barbero – drums

Technical

- Jack Endino – production, recording
- Carol Hibbs – mastering
- Tom Robinson – photography (back)
- Charles Peterson – photography (front)
