= Bruise Violet =

1992 single by Babes in Toyland

Single by Babes in Toyland

from the album Fontanelle
- B-side: "Magic Flute"; "Gone"
- Released: November 1992
- Recorded: Recorded at 5th Floor Studios, Minneapolis in February 1992
- Genre: Grunge
- Length: 2:52
- Label: Southern Records
- Songwriter: Kat Bjelland

Babes in Toyland singles chronology
"Handsome and Gretel" (1991)	"Bruise Violet" (1992)	"Catatonic" (1993)

"Bruise Violet" is the third single by American alternative rock band Babes in Toyland and the second single from their 1992 album Fontanelle. It was released on purple 7" vinyl and features early or not produced versions of the song.

== Music video ==
The band made a video for “Bruise Violet” in August 1992. Filmed in Minneapolis and in New York City at CBGB and the Brooklyn Bridge, it was directed by Gretchen Bender, and features Cindy Sherman, ten members of a Brooklyn women’s motorcycle gang, and ten extras all outfitted in blonde wigs and babydoll dresses to resemble Kat Bjelland. It debuted on MTV’s 120 Minutes in October 1992, and was also featured on the twentieth episode of the second season of Beavis and Butt-Head, "Babes-R-Us".

== Track listing ==
1. "Bruise Violet"
2. "Magic Flute"
3. "Gone"

== Personnel ==
- Kat Bjelland – vocals, guitar
- Michelle Leon – bass
- Lori Barbero – drums
