= The Peel Sessions (Babes in Toyland album) =

1992 live album by Babes in Toyland

Compilation album by Babes in Toyland
- Released: March 30, 1992
- Recorded: September 9, 1990–Jun 11, 1991
- Studio: BBC Radio 1 Studios, London, England
- Genre: Punk rock
- Length: 26:22
- Label: Strange Fruit/Dutch East India Trading
- Producer: Dale Buffin Griffin

Babes in Toyland chronology
| To Mother (1991) | The Peel Sessions (1992) | Fontanelle (1992) |

Professional ratings
Review scores
| Source | Rating |
|---|---|
| Allmusic | 3/5 stars |

The Peel Sessions is a live album recorded by American punk rock band Babes in Toyland, released in 1992. It was produced by Dale "Buffin" Griffin and released by Strange Fruit Records/Dutch East India Trading. The release was included on The BBC John Peel Sessions, 1990–1992 in 2001. That reissue included all of their output recorded for BBC.

== Track listing ==
All song by Babes in Toyland

1. "Catatonic" - 2:53
2. "Ripe" - 3:36
3. "Primus" - 3:58
4. "Spit to See the Shine" - 2:40
5. "Pearl" - 2:03
6. "Dogg" - 5:11
7. "Laugh My Head Off" - 3:30
8. "Mad Pilot" - 2:50

== Personnel ==
- Kat Bjelland – vocals, guitar
- Lori Barbero – drums, vocals (3, 6)
- Michelle Leon – bass
