= Catatonia (disambiguation) =

Catatonia is a medical condition characterized by immobility and unresponsiveness.

Catatonia may also refer to:

- Catatonia (band), a Welsh rock band
- Katatonia, a Swedish metal band
- "Catatonic" (song), a song by Babes in Toyland
- "Catatonia", a song by the Amity Affliction from the album Everyone Loves You... Once You Leave Them
