= Amusia (disambiguation) =

Amusia is a musical disorder that includes defects in pitch detection, musical memory and recognition.

Amusia may also refer to:

== Music ==
- Amusia, a 2010 collaborative album by Danish musician Jasper Høiby
- Amusia, a 1994 album by American musician Elliott Sharp
- "Amusia", a song from the 2013 Karnivool album Asymmetry
- Amusia (album), a 2001 album by Katastrophy Wife

== Other uses ==
- Amusia (spider), a genus of spiders
- "Amusia", an episode of Mozart in the Jungle, a TV series from Amazon
