= Nemesisters =

1995 album by Babes in Toyland

Studio album by Babes in Toyland
- Released: May 9, 1995
- Recorded: Late 1994–early 1995
- Studios: AmRep, Minneapolis, Minnesota
- Genres: Heavy metal, grunge
- Length: 55:54
- Label: Reprise
- Producer: Tim Mac

Babes in Toyland chronology
Dystopia (1994)	Nemesisters (1995)	Lived (2000)

Nemesisters is the third and final studio album recorded by Babes in Toyland. It was produced by Tim Mac, and released on May 9, 1995, by Reprise Records.

== Recording ==
The album was recorded under engineer and producer Tim Mac at AmRep Studios in Minneapolis, Minnesota. Unlike on the group's previous releases, they opted to record together to capture a "live band" sound; on their previous release, Fontanelle, bassist Maureen Herman had recorded her bass tracks separately from vocalist-guitarist Kat Bjelland and drummer Lori Barbero. The recordings were split into two different sessions. Portions of the album had been written while the band was on tour in Europe. In a March 1995 interview with Barbero, she said the band would likely "be working on the album until Christmas."

== Critical response ==
Professional ratings
Review scores
Source	Rating
AllMusic	2/5 stars
Chicago Tribune	2/4 stars
Entertainment Weekly	B
Kerrang!	2/5 stars
NME	4/10
Rolling Stone	4/5 stars
The Rolling Stone Album Guide	2/5 stars
Spin	4/10

Tom Sinclair of Entertainment Weekly wrote of the album: "Believe it or not, these Minneapolis ragecore queens have toned down their maximum-stridency shtick a tad, delivering an album that at times actually skirts power pop (check out "Sweet ’69"). The result is still fairly punishing, but there’s a reward for listeners who stick it out to the last cut: a killer version of Sister Sledge’s "We Are Family." Lorraine Ali of Spin wrote: "With Nemesisters, Babes in Toyland's molten core seems to have somewhat solidified; this album ultimately lacks the conviction, depth, and even direction of its predecessors."

Stephen Thomas Erlewine of AllMusic noted that "most of the raw, slashing guitars of their early records are gone, replaced by a pulsing, plodding grind that never catches fire ... the majority of the album is simply dull, recycled riffs and rhythms, and that is hard to forgive."

== Track listing ==
All tracks are written by Babes in Toyland, except where noted.

No.	Title	Writer(s)	Length
1.	"Hello"		4:45
2.	"Oh Yeah!"		3:16
3.	"Drivin'"		3:17
4.	"Sweet '69"		4:05
5.	"Surd"		4:43
6.	"22"		3:15
7.	"Ariel"		4:24
8.	"Killer on the Road"		4:02
9.	"Middle Man"		4:46
10.	"Memory"		3:43
11.	"S.F.W."		3:59
12.	"All by Myself"	Eric Carmen, Sergei Rachmaninoff	4:37
13.	"Deep Song"	George Cory; Douglas Cross	2:45
14.	"We Are Family"	Nile Rodgers; Bernard Edwards	4:11

== Personnel ==
- Kat Bjelland – guitar, vocals
- Maureen Herman – bass, vocals (8), piano (12)
- Lori Barbero – drums, vocals (3, 8, 9, 13)

== Chart positions ==
Year	Single	Chart	Peak position
1995	"Sweet '69"	Modern Rock Tracks	37
1995	"We Are Family"	Hot Dance Music/Club Play	22
