= Handsome and Gretel =

1991 single by Babes in Toyland

Single by Babes in Toyland

from the album Fontanelle
- B-side: "Pearl"
- Released: 1991
- Recorded: April 1991
- Studio: Six Feet Under, Minneapolis, Minnesota
- Genre: Alternative rock; punk rock
- Length: 1:51
- Label: Insipid
- Songwriter(s): Kat Bjelland

Babes in Toyland singles chronology
"House" (1990)	"Handsome and Gretel" (1991)	"Bruise Violet" (1992)

"Handsome and Gretel" is the third single by American punk band Babes in Toyland. It was released on 7" vinyl, and its songs later appeared on the band's second studio album, Fontanelle.

== Artwork ==
There are two versions of the single's cover. The most known one is of singer, Kat Bjelland, sitting in a police car with blood on her legs after getting into a car accident in Arizona in 1988. Drummer Lori Barbero talks about this incident in a 1989 issue of the zine, No Idea:

Lori: I was driving in Arizona last week and I was thinking about being in a car accident, 'cause we've been in both earthquakes in San Francisco – the major ones – and I was thinking, "Gosh, we haven't been in a car accident." And right then, I just went "Oh my fucking God." And a tire flew off a guy's truck, through the gulley, out into the air a hundred miles an hour, and it blew the windshield out and tore the sunroof off and totaled the van. As soon as the accident was over I kept going...

All: "I can't believe what I was thinking about."

Kat: "We have a picture of it."

The back cover art features drummer Lori Barbero, with what appears to be a nosebleed.

== Release ==
The single was released on June 1, 1991 as a limited edition 7" by the independent Australian label Insipid Records. On August 22, 2016, Blank Recording Co. re-released the single on 7" vinyl.

== Track listing ==
All tracks are written by Kat Bjelland

No.	Title	Length
1.	"Handsome and Gretel"	1:51
2.	"Pearl"	1:57
Total length:		3:08

== Personnel ==
Musicians

- Kat Bjelland – vocals, guitar
- Lori Barbero – drums
- Michelle Leon – bass

Technical

- Tim Mac – engineering, production
- Abaddon – photography
