= Katastrophy Wife =

American rock band formed by Kat Bjelland in 1998

- Origin: Minneapolis, Minnesota, United States
- Genres: Alternative rock, punk rock, indie rock
- Years active: 1998–2010
- Labels: Almafame, Integrity Records, RiSH Records, Sympathy for the Record Industry
- Members: Kat Bjelland; Adrian Johnson
- Past members: Brendan Parkes; Darren Donovan; Vanessa White; Andrew Parker; Glen Mattson; Keith St Louis

Katastrophy Wife was an American rock band formed by Kat Bjelland and her former husband Glen Mattson in 1998. Bjelland also fronted the punk rock band Babes in Toyland between 1987 and 2001. The band currently consists of Bjelland on lead vocals and guitar and her boyfriend, Adrian Johnson, on drums. The band released two albums, Amusia (2001) and All Kneel (2004). A third album was due for release in 2008, but was later cancelled. In May 2014, a 10th anniversary reissue of All Kneel was released as part of Record Store Day. In 2015 Kat Bjelland joined fellow Babes in Toyland band member Lori Barbero and new bass player, Clara Salyer in a reunion tour.

== History ==
=== Formation and early years (1999–2001) ===
Kat Bjelland and her then-husband Glen Mattson formed Katastrophy Wife in 1998, during the time in which Bjelland was still in Babes in Toyland. Seeing as Babes in Toyland were not performing much shows - and were unofficially defunct after bassist Maureen Herman left in 1996 - Katastrophy Wife soon became Bjelland's main musical output.

The band's first production was the soundtrack for the comic Witchblade on DreamWorks. The soundtrack featured other artists such as Buzz Osborne of the Melvins, Lydia Lunch, Miho Hatori of Cibo Matto, Girls Against Boys and Dave Ogilvie of Skinny Puppy.

In 2000, the band recorded their debut album Amusia and released it in 2001. Featuring original bassist Keith St. Louis, the album achieved considerable indie success, even acquiring the band a slot at the infamous Reading Festival in 2002 and a headline spot on the UK leg of the United States' Ladyfest in 2001. Their first single, and opening track from the album, "Gone Away", was released in 2001. After the performance at the Reading Festival, Glen Mattson and Keith St. Louis departed from the band, with Andrew Parker and Darren Donovan replacing them, respectively. Vanessa White, former guitarist of Twist, also joined the band.

=== Name issues, Bastard, and All Kneel (2002–2004) ===
During Katastrophy Wife's short tour of Europe in 2002, Kat Bjelland used the title of her old band Babes in Toyland. However, after facing legal problems from former band members, Bjelland reconsidered and reverted the name back to Katastrophy Wife. Around this time, Bjelland's friend Courtney Love of Hole announced her new, short-lived punk band, Bastard, which she asked Bjelland to join. Bjelland denied Love's offer stating that:

"It seemed too conceptualised, like she'd spent too much time thinking about how a band should be [...] Courtney and I make great music together, there's a good spark there, but let's say our personalities would not have been a great mix at that time."

Katastrophy Wife's second studio album, All Kneel, was released in June 2004 to favourable reviews. Three singles were released from the album, Liberty Belle, Money Shot and Blue Valient with UK singer-songwriter Carina Round, a song originally written and recorded during the sessions for Witchblade.

=== Reissue and current status (2005–2010) ===
Parker, Donovan and White left the group in 2006, leaving Bjelland and Johnson the remaining band members. After their bandmates' departures, both Bjelland and Johnson continued to record under the name Katastrophy Wife. They began recording again and in May 2007 released Heart-On, their first single in three years from the later cancelled album Pregnant.

Pregnant was initially planned for released in 2008 but was cancelled for undisclosed reasons. Bjelland reported that in 2007 she suffered a schizophrenic breakdown and was receiving treatment. A further release date was announced for 2009, however, this did not follow through either. The band's Myspace page has been inactive since December 2010.

== Members ==
=== Final Lineup ===
- Kat Bjelland - vocals, guitar (1998–2010)
- Adrian Johnson - drums (2007–2010)

=== Former members ===
- Andrew Parker - bass (2002–2004)
- Darren Donovan - drums (2002–2005)
- Vanessa White - guitars (2004–2006)
- Glen Mattson - drums (1999–2001)
- Keith St Louis - bass (1999–2001)
- Brendon Parkes - guitars (2004–2005)
- Oliver James - bass (2004–2005)

== Discography ==
=== Studio albums ===
- Amusia (2001)
- All Kneel (2004)
- Dysrhythmia (Compilation Album) (2016)

=== Album Reissues ===
- All Kneel: 10th Anniversary (2014)

=== Singles/EPs ===
- Gone Away (2001) Top UK Indie Singles #14
- Liberty Belle (2003) Top UK Singles peak position #145
- Money Shot (2003)
- Blue Valiant (feat. Carina Round) (2004)
- Heart On (2007)
