= Liberty Belle (song) =

Single by Katastrophy Wife

from the album All Kneel
- B-side: "Ice Cream and Cigarettes"
- Released: 2003
- Recorded: 2003
- Genre: Punk rock, Alternative rock
- Length: 2:45
- Label: Integrity Records
- Songwriter: Kat Bjelland
- Producers: Gavin Monaghan, Kat Bjelland

Katastrophy Wife singles chronology
"Gone Away" (2001)	"Liberty Belle" (2003)	"Money Shot" (2003)

"Liberty Belle" is the first single off American rock band Katastrophy Wife's second album, All Kneel. The single peaked at #145 on the UK's Official Singles chart in June 2003.

== Track listing ==
No.	Title	Length
1.	"Liberty Belle"	2:45
2.	"Ice Cream and Cigarettes (Neil Is The Only One Version)"	2:28

== Personnel ==
- Bass – Andrew Parker
- Drums – Darren Donovan
- Engineer – Andrew Taylor
- Mixed By – Gavin Monaghan
- Producer – Gavin Monaghan, Kat Bjelland, Kurt-Pagan Davies
- Vocals, Guitar – Kat Bjelland
