= 1991: The Year Punk Broke =

1992 documentary film by Dave Markey

- VHS box cover of 1991: The Year Punk Broke
- Directed by: Dave Markey
- Produced by: We Got Power Productions; Sonic Life
- Music by: Sonic Youth; Nirvana; Dinosaur Jr; Babes in Toyland; Gumball; The Ramones
- Distributed by: Tara Films
- Release date: December 24, 1992
- Running time: 95 minutes
- Country: United States
- Language: English

1991: The Year Punk Broke, released theatrically in 1992, is a documentary directed by Dave Markey, featuring American alternative rock band Sonic Youth on tour in Europe in 1991. While Sonic Youth is the focus of the documentary, the film also gives attention to Nirvana, Dinosaur Jr., Babes in Toyland, Gumball and the Ramones. Also featured in the film are Mark Arm, Dan Peters and Matt Lukin of Mudhoney, and roadie Joe Cole, who was murdered in a robbery three months after the tour ended. The film is dedicated to Cole.

Several scenes in the film involve re-enactments and references to scenes from the Madonna tour documentary Truth or Dare, such as Gordon complaining about "industry people" in the front row, or Cobain, introduced as "Costner", telling Sonic Youth that their show was "neat". At a screening of the film at the 2008 All Tomorrow's Parties festival in Monticello, New York, Markey mentioned that the working title for the film was Tooth or Hair, as a further play on this connection.

== Cast ==
Sonic Youth

- Kim Gordon
- Thurston Moore
- Lee Ranaldo
- Steve Shelley

Babes in Toyland

- Lori Barbero
- Kat Bjelland
- Michelle Leon

Dinosaur Jr.

- Mike Johnson
- J Mascis
- Murph

Gumball

- Don Fleming
- Jay Spiegel
- Eric Vermillion

Mudhoney

- Mark Arm
- Matt Lukin
- Dan Peters

Nirvana

- Kurt Cobain
- Dave Grohl
- Krist Novoselic

Ramones

- C. J. Ramone
- Joey Ramone
- Johnny Ramone
- Marky Ramone

Others

- Nic Close
- Joe Cole
- Dave Kendall
- Courtney Love
- Dave Markey
- Craig Montgomery
- Bob Mould of Hüsker Dü
- Susanne Sasic
- Peter Van Der Velde – tour manager
- Dave Evans – driver

== Songs included in the film ==
The songs included in the film are:

1. Sonic Youth – "Schizophrenia"
2. Nirvana – "Negative Creep"
3. Sonic Youth – "Brother James"
4. Nirvana – "School"
5. Sonic Youth – "Teen Age Riot"
6. Dinosaur Jr. – "Freak Scene"
7. Babes In Toyland – "Dust Cake Boy"
8. Sonic Youth – "Dirty Boots"
9. Nirvana – "Endless, Nameless"
10. Sonic Youth – "I Love Her All The Time"
11. Gumball – "Pre"
12. Dinosaur Jr. – "The Wagon"
13. Sonic Youth – "Mote"
14. Nirvana – "Smells Like Teen Spirit"
15. The Ramones – "Commando"
16. Sonic Youth – "Kool Thing"
17. Nirvana – "Polly"
18. Sonic Youth – "Expressway To Yr. Skull"

== Tour dates ==
The film takes place over the course of Sonic Youth and Nirvana's 1991 European tour. The European dates, given at the beginning of the film, are as follows:

Date	City	Country	Venue/Festival
August 20, 1991	Cork	Ireland	Sir Henry's
August 21, 1991	Dublin	Ireland	Top Hat
August 23, 1991	Reading	United Kingdom	Reading Festival
August 24, 1991	Cologne	Germany	Monsters of Spex Festival – Tanzbrunnen
August 25, 1991	Hasselt	Belgium	Pukkelpop
August 27, 1991	Bremen	Germany	Überschall 91 – Aladin Music Hall
August 28, 1991	Halle	Germany	Easy Schorre
August 29, 1991	Stuttgart	Germany	Longhorn Country & Western Saloon
August 30, 1991	Nuremberg	Germany	Serenadenhof
September 1, 1991	Rotterdam	Netherlands	Ein Abend In Wien – De Doelen

== Home media ==
A home video VHS was released by the David Geffen Company on April 13, 1993. The film was again re-released on DVD on September 13, 2011, by the Universal Music Group. In 2012, Nirvana's performance of "Negative Creep" from the release was uploaded to the band's official YouTube channel.

== Charts ==
=== Original 1993 VHS release ===
Chart (1993)	Peak position
US Top Music Videos (Billboard)	25

=== 2011 DVD re-release ===
Chart (2011)	Peak position
UK Music Videos (OCC)	7
