= Frightwig =

American punk band

- Origin: San Francisco, California, U.S.
- Genres: Punk rock
- Years active: 1982–1994, 2012–present
- Labels: Subterranean; Caroline; Boner; Southern; Label 51 Recordings
- Members: Deanna Mitchell; Mia d'Bruzzi; Tina Fagnani; Rebecca Sevrin
- Past members: Rachel Thoele; Susan Miller; Tana; Paula Frazer; Lynn Perko; Bambi Nonymous; Alistair Shanks; Anne Harney; Robert Castenada; Dana Ross; Cecilia Kuhn; Eric Drew Feldman
- Website: http://frightwig.org

Frightwig is an all-female punk rock band from San Francisco, California, formed in 1982 by Deanna Mitchell and Mia d'Bruzzi.

The current lineup of Frightwig consists of Deanna Mitchell, Mia d'Bruzzi, Tina Fagnani, and Rebecca Sevrin.

== History ==
Formed in San Francisco in 1982, Frightwig has produced several songs criticizing patriarchal norms.

In an interview with SFGate, D’Bruzzi stated that the band's name came from a slang word that was popular at the time, which meant, "a woman who has been out drinking cocktails, and she started out looking pretty good. Then it’s just the end of the night. Her tights are ripped, her lipstick’s smeared. Mascara’s down the face, and she’s still tipsy."

Frightwig has released cult-favorite albums including Cat Farm Faboo (Subterranean Records 1984), Faster, Frightwig, Kill! Kill! (Caroline Records 1986), and the EP Phone Sexy (Boner Records 1988). Frightwig has had different lineups, including the addition of Eric Drew Feldman (Captain Beefheart, Snakefinger, Frank Black, Pere Ubu, PJ Harvey, Knife & Fork), in 2012.

Throughout the 1980s, Frightwig toured America, Canada, and Europe, and opened for Butthole Surfers and Redd Kross.

On May 4, 2017, band member Cecilia Kuhn died of cancer. Her bandmates honored her wishes that Frightwig would not disband. In 2023, Mitchell, d’Bruzzi, Feldman, Sevrin returned with a new album, released on Label 51 Recordings. A collection of 11 songs (four of which were previously released) recorded with Kuhn on drums, vocals, and accordion and produced by Eric Drew Feldman.

== Legacy ==
Frightwig was a significant influence on the Riot grrl movement, inspiring Bikini Kill, Hole, L7, and Lunachicks. Courtney Love described seeing a Frightwig show on the same night as Jennifer Finch of L7 and Kat Bjelland of Babes In Toyland. She said they "all decided to start bands the next day. They are the true grandmothers of riot grrl."

Frightwig has also influenced bands such as Melvins and Faith No More. Kurt Cobain wore a Frightwig T-shirt under his cardigan during Nirvana's performance on MTV Unplugged.

== Most recent lineup ==
- Deanna Mitchell (Vocals/Bass)
- Mia d'Bruzzi (Vocals/Guitar)
- Tina Fagnani (Vocals/Drums)
- Rebecca Sevrin (Vocals/Guitar)

== Former members ==
- Rachel Thoele
- Susan Miller
- Tana
- Paula Frazer
- Lynn Perko
- Bambi Nonymous
- Alistair Shanks
- Anne Harney
- Robert Castenada
- Dana Ross
- Eric Drew Feldman
- Cecilia Kuhn

== Discography ==
=== Studio albums ===
- Cat Farm Faboo (1984; Subterranean Records)
- Faster, Frightwig, Kill! Kill! (1986; Caroline Records)
- We Need to Talk... (2023; Label 51 Recordings)

=== Singles/EPs ===
- Phonesexy EP (1990; Boner Records)
- Hit Return EP (2013, self-released)
- War On Women 7" Single (2014, self-released)
- "Hot air rising" single (2026)

=== Compilations ===
- Teriyaki Asthma Volume III (V/A compilation) (1990; C/Z Records)
- Teriyaki Asthma Volumes I-V (V/A compilation) (1992; C/Z Records)
- Wild Women Never Die... (compilation of first two albums) (1993; Southern Records)

== See also ==
- List of all-female bands
