= Dust Cake Boy =

1989 single by Babes in Toyland

Single by Babes in Toyland

from the album Spanking Machine
- B-side: "Spit to See the Shine"
- Released: 1989
- Recorded: October 1988
- Studio: Technisound Studio, Seattle, Washington
- Genre: Punk rock; alternative rock
- Length: 3:32
- Label: Treehouse Records
- Songwriter(s): Kat Bjelland

Babes in Toyland singles chronology
"Dust Cake Boy" (1989)	"House" (1990)

"Dust Cake Boy" is the first single by Babes in Toyland from their debut album, Spanking Machine. It was released on black 7" vinyl and features the final version of the song, along with an earlier version of the song "Spit to See the Shine" as a b-side, which was later released on the 1991 EP, To Mother.

== Track listing ==
All tracks are written by Kat Bjelland.

No.	Title	Length
1.	"Dust Cake Boy"	3:32
2.	"Spit To See The Shine"	2:45
Total length:		6:17

== Personnel ==
Musicians

- Kat Bjelland – vocals, guitar
- Michelle Leon – bass
- Lori Barbero – drums

Technical

- Brian Paulson – mixing
- Dromette – artwork design
- Brad Miller – photography
