= All Kneel =

Studio album by Katastrophy Wife
- Released: June 14, 2004
- Recorded: 2003
- Genres: Alternative rock, punk rock
- Length: 36:20
- Labels: Integrity Records; DYI (2014 reissue); Cargo Records (2014 reissue)
- Producers: Gavin Monaghan, Andrew Taylor, Kat Bjelland, Kurt-Pagan Davies

Katastrophy Wife chronology
Amusia (2002)	All Kneel (2004)

Singles from All Kneel
- 1. "Liberty Belle" Released: 2003; 2. "Money Shot" Released: 2003; 3. "Blue Valiant" Released: 2004

2014 reissue cover

All Kneel is the second and final studio album by American alternative rock band Katastrophy Wife. It had favorable reviews and had three singles and videos released from the album. A limited edition blue vinyl reissue was released on Record Store Day 2014 for its 10th anniversary.

== Background and recording ==
All Kneel was the first Katastrophy Wife album recorded for Integrity Records, and marked a significant shift in the band's lineup from the one that had recorded the debut album Amusia (2001). Following the dissolution of the original lineup, Kat Bjelland relocated between her home in Minneapolis, Minnesota and Birmingham, England, where she assembled a new set of collaborators: British bassist Andrew Parker, drummer Darren Donovan (formerly of doom rock band Sally and grindcore outfit Mistress), and additional guitarist Vanessa White (formerly of Twist). Bjelland had previously worked with Parker and Donovan on the noise project Lash Frenzy.

The album was recorded at The Magic Garden studio in late 2003, engineered and mixed by Andrew Taylor, and produced by Gavin Monaghan — known for his work with Editors, Goldblade, and The Twang — alongside Bjelland and Kurt-Pagan Davies. Bjelland described the recording approach as deliberately fast and raw, saying the album divided into two distinct halves: the first featuring the more accessible, singles-oriented songs, and the second catering to what she called "the weirdo stoner rock people."

== Music and style ==
All Kneel is a fuzzed-up, high-energy alternative rock album driven by aggressive guitar work and Bjelland's distinctive vocal style, which shifts between whispered melody and full-throated screaming. Critics noted the album sounded anything but a slackening of pace, with guitars roaring through speakers and Bjelland's vocals pleading, screaming, and bellowing across the album's 11 tracks.

== Reception ==
Professional ratings
Review scores
Source	Rating
Big Cheese	4/5 stars
Classic Rock	4/5 stars
Drowned in Sound	7/10
Kerrang!	4/5 stars
Mojo	3/5 stars
NME	7/10
Q	4/5 stars
Rock Sound	7/10

Drowned in Sound said 'All Kneel sounds anything but a slackening of the pace. Guitars roar menacingly through the speakers, Kat vocals plead and scream and bellow in all the correct measures...'.

== Track listing ==
All songs written by Kat Bjelland.

No.	Title	Length
1.	"Liberty Belle"	2:43
2.	"Money Shot"	2:59
3.	"Sweetheart"	2:40
4.	"Blue Valiant"	3:58
5.	"Emit Time"	3:42
6.	"Ice Cream & Cigarettes"	1:59
7.	"Babydoll"	3:51
8.	"Asstroglide"	3:44
9.	"No Thing"	3:30
10.	"Layne To Rest"	3:28
11.	"Suffrage"	3:46

2014 Deluxe Edition bonus tracks
No.	Title	Length
12.	"Ice Cream & Cigarettes" (Neil Is The Only One Version)	2:27
13.	"Money Shot" (Demo)	2:50
14.	"Sweetheart" (Tim Mac Version)	2:24
15.	"No Thing" (Tim Mac Version)	2:56
16.	"Blue Valient" (Stripped)	3:46
17.	"Alectronancy"	5:08
18.	"Liberty Belle" (Bis Remix)	4:10
19.	"Blue Valient" (Jon Glass Remix)	5:08
20.	"Sweetheart" (Spatula Remix)	3:21
21.	"Wind-Up Monkey"	1:07

== Personnel ==
Katastrophy Wife

- Kat Bjelland – vocals, guitar
- Andrew Parker – bass
- Darren Donovan – drums

Guest musicians

- Carina Round – additional vocals
