= Spanking Machine =

1990 album by Babes in Toyland

Studio album by Babes in Toyland
- Released: April 16, 1990
- Recorded: 1989
- Studio: Reciprocal Recording, Seattle, Washington, U.S.
- Genre: Grunge
- Length: 35:44
- Label: Twin/Tone
- Producer: Jack Endino; Babes in Toyland

Babes in Toyland chronology
Spanking Machine (1990)	To Mother (1991)

Spanking Machine is the debut studio album by American punk rock band Babes in Toyland, released on April 16, 1990.

== Background and production ==
The working title of the album was Swamp Pussy, which later ended up becoming the opening song on the album. The album title was later changed to Spanking Machine, after the "spanking machine" from an episode of Leave It to Beaver titled "The Price of Fame".

The album was recorded and produced by Seattle musician and producer Jack Endino at Reciprocal Recording in Seattle – where other bands such as Nirvana and Mudhoney recorded – and was released in April 1990 by Twin/Tone Records.

"Dust Cake Boy" was a different version than that previously released on 45 by the Minneapolis-based Treehouse Records in 1989. It was recorded in 1988, before the band's sessions with Jack Endino, at Technisound Studio and produced by Brian Paulson. The single was backed with "Spit to See the Shine". A promotional video for the song "He's My Thing" was also recorded, though the song was never released as a single. Recorded during a live show at Minneapolis' First Avenue, the video was recorded on a 16 mm camera by Mike Etoll.

== Critical reception ==
Professional ratings
Review scores
Source	Rating
AllMusic	4/5 stars
Entertainment Weekly	B−
The Rolling Stone Album Guide	3/5 stars
Spin Alternative Record Guide	6/10
The Village Voice	C+
Vox	8/10

Spanking Machine received generally positive reviews from critics, with Mark Deming of AllMusic stating:

[Spanking Machine] sounds like the blueprint for the music [Courtney] Love would make during Hole's first incarnation [...] that Spanking Machine is a more compelling and emotionally powerful work [and] Kat Bjelland's songs pull no punches.

Other bands interested in the underground music scene – most notably Sonic Youth – were fans of the album, so much so that Sonic Youth's Thurston Moore invited the band to perform on Sonic Youth's 1990 European tour to promote their latest album, Goo. The band also performed alongside Sonic Youth at 1991's Reading Festival, which was documented by Dave Markey's music documentary, 1991: The Year Punk Broke.

Rolling Stone ranked Spanking Machine at number 27 on its list of the "50 Greatest Grunge Albums" in 2019, writing that Spanking Machine "was a perfect marriage of crunchy Midwestern punk and wry Northwestern malaise."

== Track listing ==
All songs written by Kat Bjelland, except where noted

No.	Title	Writer(s)	Length
1.	"Swamp Pussy"		2:24
2.	"He's My Thing"		2:56
3.	"Vomit Heart"		2:48
4.	"Never"		3:16
5.	"Boto(w)rap"	Bjelland, Lori Barbero	2:31
6.	"Dogg"	Barbero	3:53
7.	"Pain in My Heart"		3:59
8.	"Lashes"		3:46
9.	"You're Right"		3:07
10.	"Dust Cake Boy"		3:31
11.	"Fork Down Throat"		3:54
Total length:			35:44

== Musicians and personnel ==
- Kat Bjelland – lead vocals, guitar
- Lori Barbero – drums, backing vocals (lead vocals on "Dogg")
- Michelle Leon – bass
- Jack Endino – production, engineering
