= Fontanelle (album) =

1992 album by Babes in Toyland

Studio album by Babes in Toyland
- Released: August 11, 1992
- Recorded: 1992
- Studio: Pachyderm (Cannon Falls, Minn.); Sorcerer (New York City)
- Genre: Alternative rock; grunge; punk rock; noise rock
- Length: 37:09
- Label: Reprise
- Producer: Lee Ranaldo; Kat Bjelland

Babes in Toyland chronology
The Peel Sessions (1992)	Fontanelle (1992)	Painkillers (1993)

Singles from Fontanelle
- 1. "Handsome and Gretel" Released: 1991; 2. "Bruise Violet" Released: 1992

Fontanelle is the second studio album by the American punk rock band Babes in Toyland, released on August 11, 1992, by Reprise Records. It was the band's first release on a major label, and their first recording to feature Maureen Herman on bass.

== Recording ==
After extensive touring throughout 1991, the band entered the studio to record their major label follow-up to their debut album, Spanking Machine. Bassist Michelle Leon left the group in December 1991, shortly before the recording of Fontanelle began, due to the murder of Joe Cole, her then boyfriend. Maureen Herman was recruited as her replacement.

The album was co-produced by frontwoman and guitarist Kat Bjelland with Lee Ranaldo of Sonic Youth heading production. Brian Paulson was also studio engineer and the final product was mixed by Dave Ogilvie. The cover photo — an image of a naked doll held up in front of a mirror — was taken for the album by photographer Cindy Sherman.

The band has explained the album's name as referring to the soft spot on the top of a baby's skull, as well as to a little fountain used by fairies. It is also the name of a magician consulted by Gilles de Rais, the real-life murderer who inspired the fairy tale "Bluebeard".

The process of recording the album is described in the book Babes in Toyland: The Making and Selling of a Rock and Roll Band, by Neal Karlen. Recording took place at Pachyderm Studio in Cannon Falls, Minnesota, and at Sorcerer Sound Recording Studios in New York City.

== Reception ==
Professional ratings
Review scores
Source	Rating
AllMusic	4/5 stars
Chicago Tribune	3.5/4 stars
Entertainment Weekly	A−
Los Angeles Times	3.5/4 stars
NME	9/10
Pitchfork	9.0/10
The Rolling Stone Album Guide	4/5 stars
Select	5/5
Spin Alternative Record Guide	7/10
Vox	9/10

Fontanelle is Babes in Toyland's most critically and commercially successful album, selling 220,000 copies approximately in the United States alone. Reviews of the album were very positive, with Steve Huey from AllMusic noting:

Measured by any standard, Fontanelle is a frighteningly primal record, one whose sheer ferocity Babes in Toyland never quite captured this convincingly anywhere else.

The album's success also prompted them to tour more and were eventually offered a place on the Lollapalooza tour in 1993, playing alongside such acts as Tool, Primus, Alice in Chains, Dinosaur Jr. and Rage Against the Machine. During dates at Lollapalooza, the band released their third and final EP, Painkillers, in June 1993, which consisted of a re-recording of one of their most notable songs "He's My Thing", and outtakes from Fontanelle.

== Track listing ==
All tracks are written by Kat Bjelland unless otherwise noted.

No.	Title	Writer(s)	Length
1.	"Bruise Violet"		2:52
2.	"Right Now"		2:19
3.	"Bluebell"		2:22
4.	"Handsome and Gretel"		1:50
5.	"Blood"		2:44
6.	"Magick Flute"	Lori Barbero	3:02
7.	"Won't Tell"		2:27
8.	"Quiet Room"		2:59
9.	"Spun"	Bjelland, Barbero	3:03
10.	"Short Song"		0:41
11.	"Jungle Train"	Bjelland, Barbero	2:15
12.	"Pearl"	Bjelland, Barbero, Michelle Leon	1:56
13.	"Real Eyes"		2:51
14.	"Mother"		3:13
15.	"Gone"		2:28
Total length:			37:09

== Personnel ==
All personnel credits adapted from the album's liner notes.

Babes in Toyland

- Kat Bjelland – vocals, guitar
- Maureen Herman – bass
- Lori Barbero – drums, vocals (6)

Technical personnel

- Lee Ranaldo – producer, engineer
- Kat Bjelland – producer
- Brian Paulson – engineer
- John Armstrong – assistant engineer
- John Azelvandre – assistant engineer
- Eric S. Anderson – assistant engineer
- Howie Weinberg – mastering
- Dave Ogilvie – mixing

Design personnel

- Tom Recchion – art direction, design
- Cindy Sherman – photography (front cover)
- Michael Lavine – photography (inlay)
- Fredrik Nilsen – photography (inlay)

== Chart positions ==
Chart (1992)	Peak position
UK Albums Chart	24
