= Amusia (album) =

Studio album by Katastrophy Wife
- Released: July 9, 2001 (United Kingdom) March 19, 2002 (USA)
- Studio: Melvin Ray Studios and Terrarium Studios in Minneapolis, Minnesota
- Genre: Punk rock; alternative rock
- Length: 47:34
- Label: Almafame
- Producer: Brad Cassetto

Katastrophy Wife chronology
Amusia (2001)	All Kneel (2004)

Amusia is the first album by American punk rock band Katastrophy Wife, released in 2001 in the UK and 2002 in the US.

== Track listing ==
All tracks are written by Kat Bjelland.

No.	Title	Length
1.	"Gone Away"	3:57
2.	"Boomerang Doll"	4:48
3.	"Git Go"	3:05
4.	"Rosacea"	5:27
5.	"Pretty Car"	3:11
6.	"Anathema"	4:47
7.	"Knife Fight"	4:03
8.	"Haunted"	4:23
9.	"Window"	5:29
10.	"Widdershins"	3:45
11.	"Rosacello" (Hidden track)	3:34

== Personnel ==
- Kat Bjelland – vocals, guitar
- Keith St. Louis – bass
- Glen Mattson – drums
