= Natural Babe Killers =

2000 compilation album by Babes in Toyland

Compilation album by Babes in Toyland
- Released: July 11, 2000
- Recorded: September 12, 1990 – February 25, 1998
- Genre: Punk rock, grunge
- Length: 1:09:27
- Label: Recall Records

Babes in Toyland chronology
Lived (2000)	Natural Babe Killers (2000)	Devil (2000)

Professional ratings
Review scores
Source	Rating
AllMusic	3/5 stars
Sputnikmusic	3

Natural Babe Killers is a live compilation album recorded by Babes in Toyland. The album consists of alternate versions of previously released tracks, as well various previously unreleased material. It was released on July 11, 2000 by Recall Records. "Bubble, Bubble, Toil & Trouble" and "Fair Is Foul & Foul Is Fair" are the first studio recordings of Babes in Toyland singing the three witches' parts in William Shakespeare's Macbeth. These songs were previously recorded live and included on the band's 2000 live album, Lived.

== Track listing (disc one) ==
1. "Bruise Violet"
2. "Won't Tell"
3. "Jungle Train"
4. "We Are Family"
5. "Big Top"
6. "Magick Flute"
7. "Memory"
8. "Dogg"
9. "Fork Down Throat"

== Track listing (disc two) ==
1. "Mad Pilot"
2. "Ripe"
3. "Ya Know That Guy"
4. "Spun"
5. "Primus"
6. "Sweet '69"
7. "Hubble Bubble Toil and Trouble"
8. "Fair Is Foul and Foul Is Fair"
9. "Fleshcrawl"
