= To Mother (EP) =

1991 EP by Babes in Toyland

EP by Babes in Toyland
- Released: July 1, 1991
- Recorded: 1990
- Studios: Southern Studios, London, England
- Genres: Punk rock; alternative rock
- Length: 22:17
- Label: Twin/Tone
- Producer: John Loder

Babes in Toyland chronology
Spanking Machine (1990)	To Mother (1991)	The Peel Sessions (1992)

Professional ratings
Review scores
Source	Rating
AllMusic	3/5 stars
NME	8/10
The Rolling Stone Album Guide	2/5 stars
Robert Christgau	(dud)
Spin Alternative Record Guide	5/10

To Mother is the first EP by American punk band Babes in Toyland, released July 1, 1991 by Twin/Tone Records. It consists of outtakes from their previous release, Spanking Machine, which were re-recorded and produced by John Loder in London in 1990.

It was a commercial success in the United Kingdom, where it peaked at number 1 on the UK Indie Chart, remaining in the number 1 position for ten weeks.

== Recording ==
The material on To Mother was recorded in 1990 by engineer and producer John Loder at his private home studio (Southern Studios) in the Wood Green area of London.

== Artwork ==
A childhood photograph of Kat Bjelland's mother, Lynne Irene Higginbotham, appears on the album's cover. Bjelland's mother died of pancreatic cancer at the time of the EP's recording, which influenced the decision of both the artwork and the title.

== Release ==
To Mother was released on vinyl in the United Kingdom by the independent label Southern Records, who at the time distributed Twin/Tone Records releases abroad. In the United States, Twin/Tone released the EP on July 1, 1991 on compact disc, cassette, as well as vinyl formats.

According to Twin/Tone's official catalogue, the album sold 1,260 vinyl copies, 1,792 cassettes, and 4,336 CDs before the band signed with Warner Bros.'s Reprise Records in 1992, with whom they released their breakthrough album, Fontanelle (1992). The EP entered the UK Indie Chart at number 1, and remained there for 13 weeks, 10 of which it held the number one position.

In 1993, the independent Australian label Insipid Records released "Catatonic" as a split-single with "Death, Agonies & Screams" by Poison Idea.

== Critical response ==
Critic Steve Taylor called the EP "more varied" than their previous releases, "opening with the ranting 'Catatonic' and closing with the soothing 'Quiet Room.'" Rolling Stone awarded the album a two out of four-star rating in their 2004 album guide, while Robert Christgau gave it a "bomb" rating, the lowest in his rating classification system. John Dugan of AllMusic awarded the EP three out of five stars, noting that it is a "follow-up that's strong but not life-changing."

== Track listing ==
All tracks are written by Kat Bjelland.

No.	Title	Length
1.	"Catatonic"	2:50
2.	"Mad Pilot"	2:51
3.	"Primus"	4:00
4.	"Laugh My Head Off"	3:34
5.	"Spit to See the Shine"	2:45
6.	"Ripe"	3:39
7.	"The Quiet Room" (instrumental)	2:38
Total length:		22:17

== Personnel ==
- Kat Bjelland – vocals, guitar
- Michelle Leon – bass
- Lori Barbero – drums, vocals (3)

== Charts ==
Chart (1991)	Peak position
UK Indie Chart	1

== Works cited ==
- Bogdanov, Vladimir; Erlewine, Stephen Thomas; Woodstra, Chris (2002). All Music Guide to Rock: The Definitive Guide to Rock, Pop, and Soul. Hal Leonard Corporation/Backbeat Books. ISBN 978-0-87930-653-3. OCLC 47823606.
- Leon, Michelle (2016). I Live Inside: Memoirs of a Babe in Toyland. Minnesota Historical Society. ISBN 978-0-873-51999-1.
