= Maureen Herman =

American rock musician, born 1966

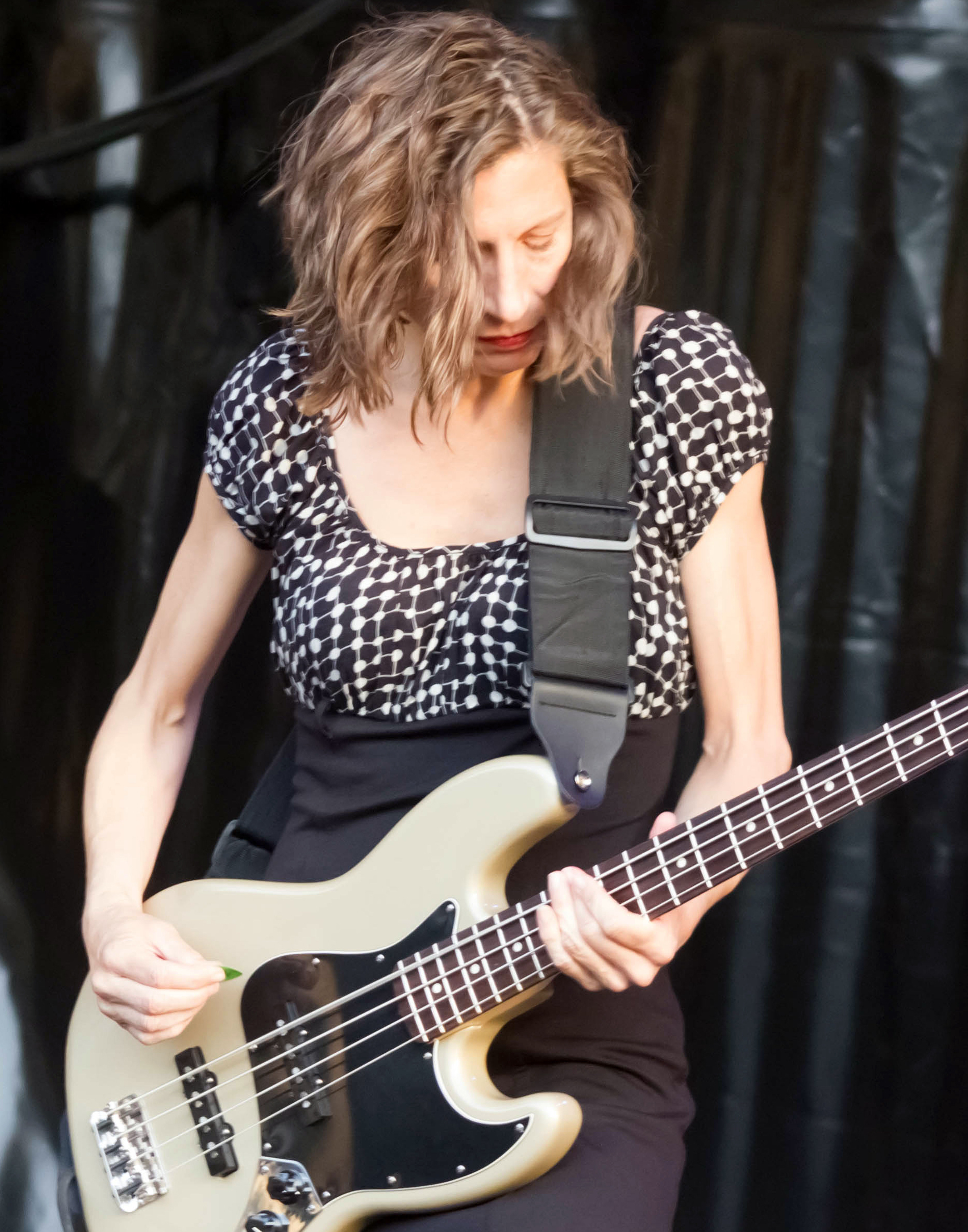
- Herman in 2015
- Born: July 25, 1966 (age 60); Philadelphia, Pennsylvania, United States
- Education: University of Minnesota
- Occupations: Musician; writer
- Years active: 1988–2015
- Children: 1
- Musical career
- Genres: Alternative rock; punk rock
- Instrument: Bass

Maureen Herman (born July 25, 1966) is an American musician and writer. She rose to prominence as the second bassist of the alternative rock band Babes in Toyland, which she joined in 1992, replacing original bassist Michelle Leon. After Herman quit the band in 1996, she became a writer and remained out of the public light for several years. In 2015, she reunited with Babes in Toyland and embarked on an international tour before she was fired later that year.

== Biography ==
=== 1966–1991: Early life and education ===
Herman was born July 25, 1966 in Philadelphia but raised in Libertyville, Illinois, and attended Libertyville High School. She worked on the high school paper Drops of Ink with Tom Morello of Rage Against the Machine and The Nightwatchman; Adam Jones of Tool; and Jim Naureckas, editor at Fairness and Accuracy in Reporting (FAIR).

Herman was introduced to punk, new wave, and alternative culture at an early age through schoolmate and high school friend Stephanie Brown, whose brother was an album cover artist for clients like Warner Bros., Beserkley Records, The Tubes, and The Stranglers. Through this connection, she attended her first rock concert at age twelve, where she saw The Stranglers and met Hugh Cornwell. Shortly after, she saw and met The Tubes, and was given a rudimentary drum lesson by Prairie Prince.

Midway through her senior year of high school, Herman moved to Prior Lake, Minnesota, though her high school diploma is from Libertyville High School.

She attended the University of Minnesota, with a major of Film Studies and minor in Journalism, and lived in Minneapolis. In January 1985, during freshman year winter break at University of Minnesota, Herman went back to Illinois to help produce a horror spoof, The Season of the Snow Bitch, with LHS alumni, notably Morello and Jones, whose band the Electric Sheep provided the soundtrack for the video.

Through Shannon Selberg, vocalist for Minneapolis noise rock band Cows, Herman met the other members of Babes in Toyland prior to their formation as a band. In 1988, after her brother injured his hand in a restaurant pasta machine accident, Herman inherited his bass guitar and started her first band, M&M Stigmata. The band booked a show before writing any songs or having a practice. Babes in Toyland's Kat Bjelland was in attendance at the band's debut at Minneapolis' Uptown Bar, where the three-piece band's singer and guitarist showed up impaired and unable to play the guitar. Bjelland recorded the show, which was played with drums, bass, and vocals only.

In 1989, Herman moved to Chicago, where she quickly became part of the burgeoning indie scene that included Steve Albini, The Jesus Lizard, Touch and Go Records, and the beginnings of the Billions Booking Agency. In 1992, while attending Columbia College Chicago and working in the English Department, Herman was invited to replace Babes in Toyland's departing bassist Michelle Leon. At the time, Herman was the bassist for Chicago band Cherry Rodriguez.

=== 1992–1996: Babes in Toyland ===
Herman replaced Leon as Babes in Toyland bassist in 1992. Herman described her initiation into the band (Harmony Central, 8/23/00):

"An old friend phoned with news that the bassist had quit the band and asked if I'd like to join. That band, Babes in Toyland, had just signed to Reprise and was about to record their major label debut. I joined. In two weeks I was on tour, with a recording session scheduled immediately after we got off the road."

She played on the band's albums Fontanelle and Nemesisters and the Painkillers EP. She sang lead vocals on the Nemesisters cut "Killer on the Road". AllMusic described her bass playing as a "gut-pounding, throttling beat".

Herman was again reunited with her Libertyville High School classmates Morello and Jones on 1993's Lollapalooza, when Babes in Toyland, Rage Against the Machine, and Tool were all playing the alternative rock tour that year.

She recounted her state of mind when she quit the band after four years, citing health issues (South Loop Review, Vol. 1):

"I couldn't remember the last time I had enjoyed music either as a player or a listener. It had been far too long. Warner Bros. and the rest of their dysfunctional family had chewed up all the good parts, leaving only the greedy, ugly parts exposed."

After Herman left, the band played sporadically with other bassists for several years, but never released another studio album.

=== 1997–2013: Post-Babes in Toyland ===
Herman went on to work as associate editor for Musician magazine and freelance journalist for Rolling Stone. In 1998, Herman started her own company, Pollyanna, which was involved in the music business in various forms, including management, booking, promotion, publicity, and music publishing. In 2000, she produced Hank Williams III's CMT-circulated video "You're the Reason", directed by P.W. Long.

In late 2000, at age 34, Herman entered her first rehabilitation for alcoholism while living in New York City. The following year, Herman was in lower Manhattan during the September 11 attacks, an event which left her with post-traumatic stress disorder. She subsequently relocated to Nashville, Tennessee. During this period, she developed a crack cocaine addiction, which spanned several years. In June 2003, she suffered a gang rape which resulted in a pregnancy. She ultimately kept the child, and gave birth to a daughter, Anna, in 2004.

=== 2014–present: Babes in Toyland reunion; departure ===
In 2014, Herman rejoined the reunited Babes in Toyland.

In August 2015, Herman was fired from the band, for originally unspecified reasons. In December 2015, Herman revealed that the reason she had been asked to leave the band was due to an article she had written for the website Boing Boing on the sexual assault of Runaways bassist Jackie Fox by manager Kim Fowley in 1975 and Joan Jett's denial of having witnessed it. Herman said that because of drummer Lori Barbero's business connections with Jett, namely Barbero producing an album for a band under Jett's record label, Blackheart Records, Herman was kicked out of the band for what Barbero believed to be hurting possible future business between Barbero and Jett.

== Sources ==
- Escamilla, Brian (1996). Contemporary Musician. Detroit, Michigan: Gale Research, Inc. ISBN 978-0-810-39317-2.
- Gaar, Gillian G. (2002). She's a Rebel:The History of Women in Rock & Roll. London: Seal Press. ISBN 978-1-58005-078-4.
- Karlen, Neil (1994). Babes in Toyland: The Making and Selling of a Rock and Roll Band. New York: Times Books. ISBN 978-0-812-92058-1.
- Romanowski, Patricia; George-Warren, Holly; Pareles, Jon, eds. (2001). Rolling Stone Encyclopedia of Rock & Roll (3rd ed.). San Francisco, California: Rolling Stone. ISBN 978-0-743-20120-9.
