= Babes in Toyland (band) =

American rock band

- Babes in Toyland in 2015

Background information
- Origin: Minneapolis, Minnesota, U.S.
- Genres: Alternative rock; punk rock; grunge
- Years active: 1987–2001; 2014–2017
- Labels: Twin Tone; Southern; Strange Fruit; Reprise; Insipid
- Past members: Kat Bjelland; Lori Barbero; Maureen Herman; Cindy Russell; Kris Holetz; Michelle Leon; Jessie Farmer; Clara Salyer

Babes in Toyland was an American alternative rock band from Minneapolis, Minnesota, formed in 1987. The band was founded by vocalist and guitarist Kat Bjelland, along with drummer Lori Barbero, vocalist Cindy Russell, and bassist Kris Holetz. Following the departures of Russell and Holetz, the band continued as a trio and recruited Michelle Leon as bassist, who quit in 1992 and was replaced by Maureen Herman.

Babes in Toyland released three studio albums: Spanking Machine (1990), followed by the commercially successful Fontanelle (1992), and Nemesisters (1995), before becoming inactive in 1997 and eventually disbanding in 2001.

After the band reunited in 2014, they began performing live together for the first time in over a decade. They completed an international tour throughout 2015, during which Herman was fired and replaced with Clara Salyer, before the band broke up again in 2017. The band is often grouped in with the riot grrrl scene.

== History ==
=== 1987–1991: Formation and early years ===
Babes in Toyland formed in 1987 after frontwoman Kat Bjelland met drummer Lori Barbero at a friend's barbecue. Originally from Woodburn, Oregon and a former resident of San Francisco, Bjelland had moved to Minneapolis to form a band. Bjelland was a self-taught guitarist, and at the time Barbero had no experience playing any instruments. Bjelland commented: "Hopefully, from being technically inexperienced, you can use your imagination, and play the drums like an instrument instead of just being a beat-keeper. And play the bass like you feel it, from your gut, instead of saying, 'Here's my scales.'" The band name refers to the eponymous 1903 operetta and alludes to its all-female lineup. In its initial formation in 1987, in addition to Bjelland and Barbero, the band included Kris Holetz on bass and singer Cindy Russell.

Following the departures of Holetz and Russell, it was believed that the band briefly recruited Bjelland's friend and former bandmate, Courtney Love, on bass, as Love claimed to have been "kicked out" of the band. However, during a 2015 interview, Bjelland and Barbero refuted this, with Barbero stating: "She lived in my house, and one time I think when we were rehearsing she came down and probably picked up something and tried to play and we were just like, 'get out of here.'" However, Michelle Leon, who was hired as the group's bass player, claimed that she was briefly replaced by Love as bassist shortly after joining. After the group rehearsed with Love on "a couple" of occasions, Leon stated Barbero called her and asked her to re-join the band. It has been noted that several songs from the Babes In Toyland's debut album shared lyrics and verses with several songs by Hole, most notably Hole's first several singles, including B-sides from "Retard Girl" and "Dicknail".

"Fork Down Throat" was performed as a Hole song in 1989 at their second and third shows, and verses from "Swamp Pussy" can be found in Hole's first recorded track, "Turpentine". Lines such as "spit to see the shine" and "my doll mouth to your deaf ear", which come from some of Hole's first singles, are found scattered in several songs from Spanking Machine as well as Fontanelle.

Although it is believed that Love and Bjelland may have written some of these songs/lines together, Bjelland originally wrote the lyrics alone after moving by herself to Minneapolis.

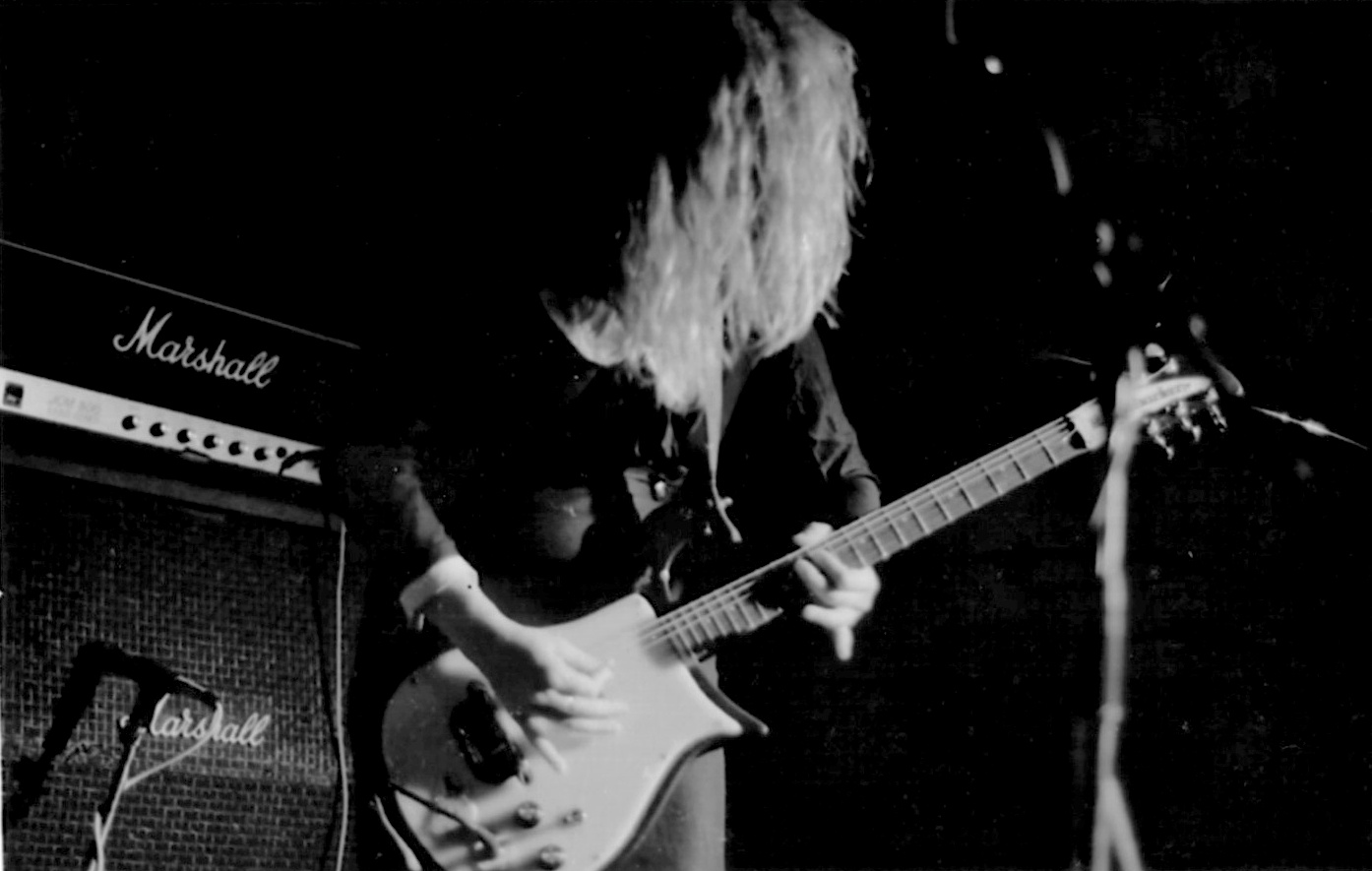
Bjelland performing with Babes in Toyland in Groningen, Netherlands, 1991

The group began performing shows at local art galleries and other venues in late 1987. Local journalist Jon Bream, who initially disparaged the band, recalled: "They were a sort of loud, abrasive, angry, obnoxious thing at first and very amateurish in a sense. And then they developed over time into something that was pretty amazing...The shows just seemed to make more sense. There was a focus there...They were able to connect with the audience." In 1988 they released their first single, "Dust Cake Boy", on Treehouse Records. The band entered the studio in 1989 to record their debut album, Spanking Machine, which was recorded with grunge producer Jack Endino at Seattle's Reciprocal Recording and released in April 1990 on Minneapolis' Twin/Tone Records. The album caught the attention of underground rock band Sonic Youth, whose frontman Thurston Moore invited the band to perform on Sonic Youth's 1990 European tour to promote their latest album, Goo. Babes in Toyland subsequently performed alongside Sonic Youth at 1991's Reading Festival, which was documented in Dave Markey's music documentary 1991: The Year Punk Broke.

British DJ John Peel was also a fan of the album, citing it as his "favourite album of 1990." During the band's tour with Sonic Youth in 1990, Babes in Toyland recorded a radio session for John Peel, one of the many Peel Sessions. The band also completed a second session with Peel in 1991, and the sessions were released as The Peel Sessions — the band's second EP — in 1992. Their first EP, To Mother, was composed of outtakes from Spanking Machine and was released in July 1991; To Mother was a commercial success, entering the UK Indie Chart at number one, and remaining in the top position for ten weeks.

=== 1992–1995: Mainstream success ===
After touring in 1991, the band entered the studio for a second time to record their major-label follow-up to Spanking Machine. Bassist Michelle Leon left the group in early 1992, shortly after the murder of Joe Cole, her then boyfriend. Maureen Herman was recruited as her replacement. With this new line-up, the band signed with Warner Bros.'s Reprise Records. Their second studio album, Fontanelle was recorded in Cannon Falls, Minnesota and in New York City, and featured production from Sonic Youth's Lee Ranaldo. Fontanelle was released in 1992, and sold over 250,000 copies in the United States alone. The lead single on the album, "Bruise Violet," is said to be an attack on Courtney Love. However, Bjelland denied this, saying instead that "Violet" was the name of a muse to both her and Love. A music video for "Bruise Violet" was shot in the SoHo loft of photographer Cindy Sherman, who also appears in the video as Bjelland's doppelganger. Sherman's photos appear on the covers of Fontanelle and the group's second EP, Painkillers, and the imagery was recreated on stage banners with the artist's permission.

In 1993, the band was chosen to take part in that year's Lollapalooza tour, playing alongside such acts as Primus, Alice in Chains, Dinosaur Jr. and Rage Against the Machine. During dates at Lollapalooza, the band released their third and final EP, Painkillers, in June 1993. In 1994, journalist Neal Karlen began writing Babes in Toyland: The Making and Selling of a Rock and Roll Band, which dealt with the band's signing to Warner and the recording of Fontanelle. Commenting on the book in retrospect, Bjelland said: "I feel bad for [Karlen]. He told me he lost a lot of his notes halfway through, and he spent his advance. So he made a lot of it up. Part of it's true. But a lot of it's not. He's apologized."

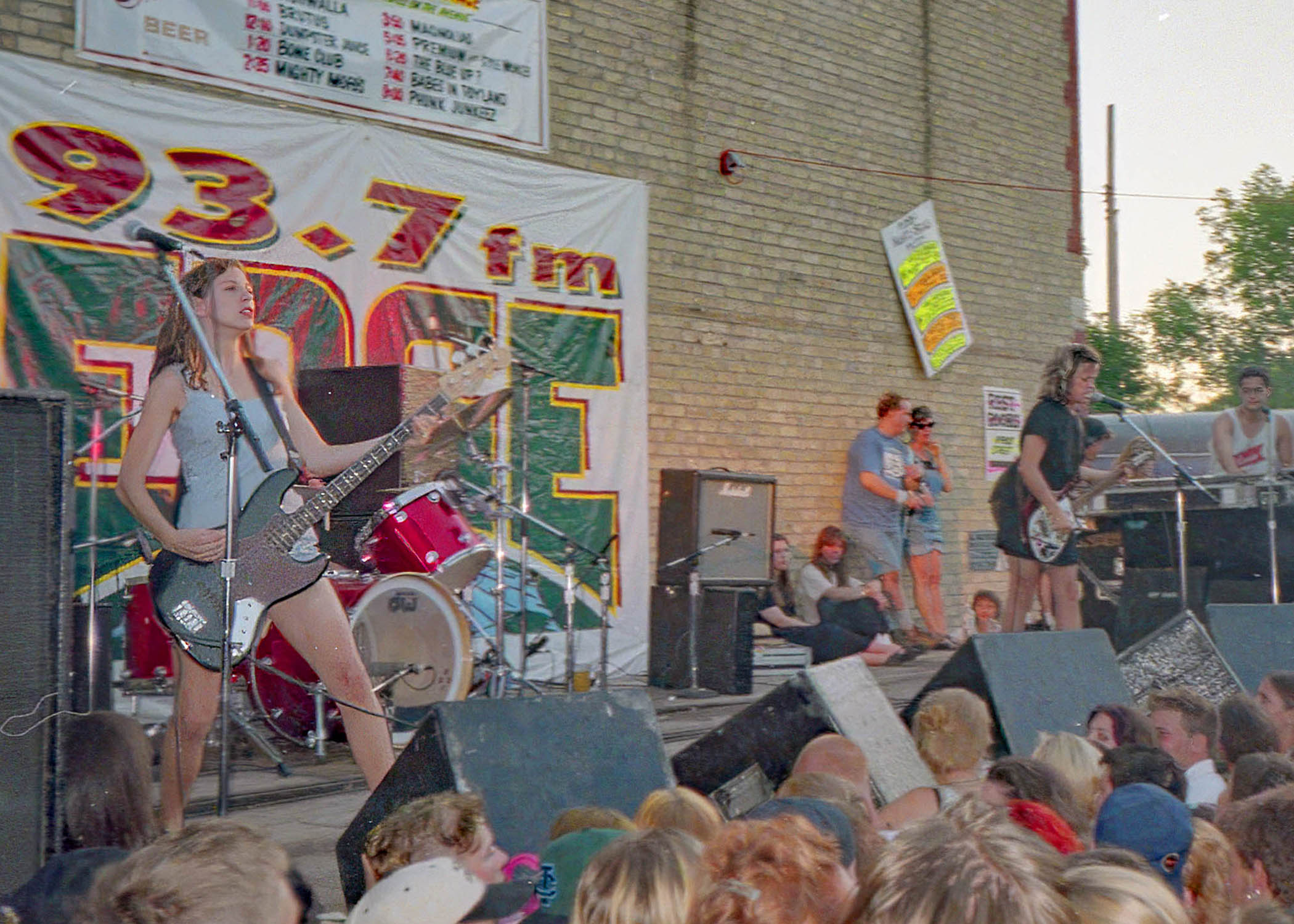
Babes in Toyland performing in Minneapolis, August 1995

On April 8, 1994, the band played a benefit show for Rock Against Domestic Violence at the Cameo Theatre in Miami, alongside 7 Year Bitch and Jack Off Jill, the same day Nirvana lead vocalist Kurt Cobain had been found dead in his Seattle home. Around the same time, the band were featured on the cover of Entertainment Weekly, and were referenced in a 1995 episode of the sitcom Roseanne.

In May 1995, the band released their final album, Nemesisters. The album received mixed reviews, with Lorraine Ali of Spin writing: "With Nemesisters, Babes in Toyland's molten core seems to have somewhat solidified; this album ultimately lacks the conviction, depth, and even direction of its predecessors." The band described the recording process of the album "diverse", "experimental" and "spontaneous" and that the writing and recording process was "very different" as the band were working under pressure.

=== 1996–2001: Herman's departure, Katastrophy Wife and breakup ===
The band lost their contract with their record label when Herman left the band due to hip problems in 1996. Dana Cochrane, formerly of the band Mickey Finn, played bass with the band on live gigs in 1996 and 1997. Original bassist Michelle Leon briefly rejoined the band in 1997, when Babes in Toyland were constantly breaking up and reforming and planning on releasing a fourth studio album. In 1998, the band was credited with the song "Overtura: Astroantiquity/Attacatastrophy" on the CD Songs of the Witchblade: A Soundtrack to the Comic Book, which Bjelland co-produced. Bjelland and Barbero played with a new bassist, Jessie Farmer, in 2000.

However, a year earlier, Bjelland had formed a new band, Katastrophy Wife. Babes in Toyland performed a reunion show billed as "The Last Tour" on November 25, 2000—which was released as a live album called Minneapolism—and this was not only the last Babes in Toyland show, but also the last official activity at the time. Bjelland played a number of shows in Europe in 2002 under the name Babes in Toyland with a new drummer and bassist from the British band Angelica; however, Bjelland stopped using the name after Barbero and Herman raised legal issues.

=== 2014–2020: Reunion, tour and second breakup ===
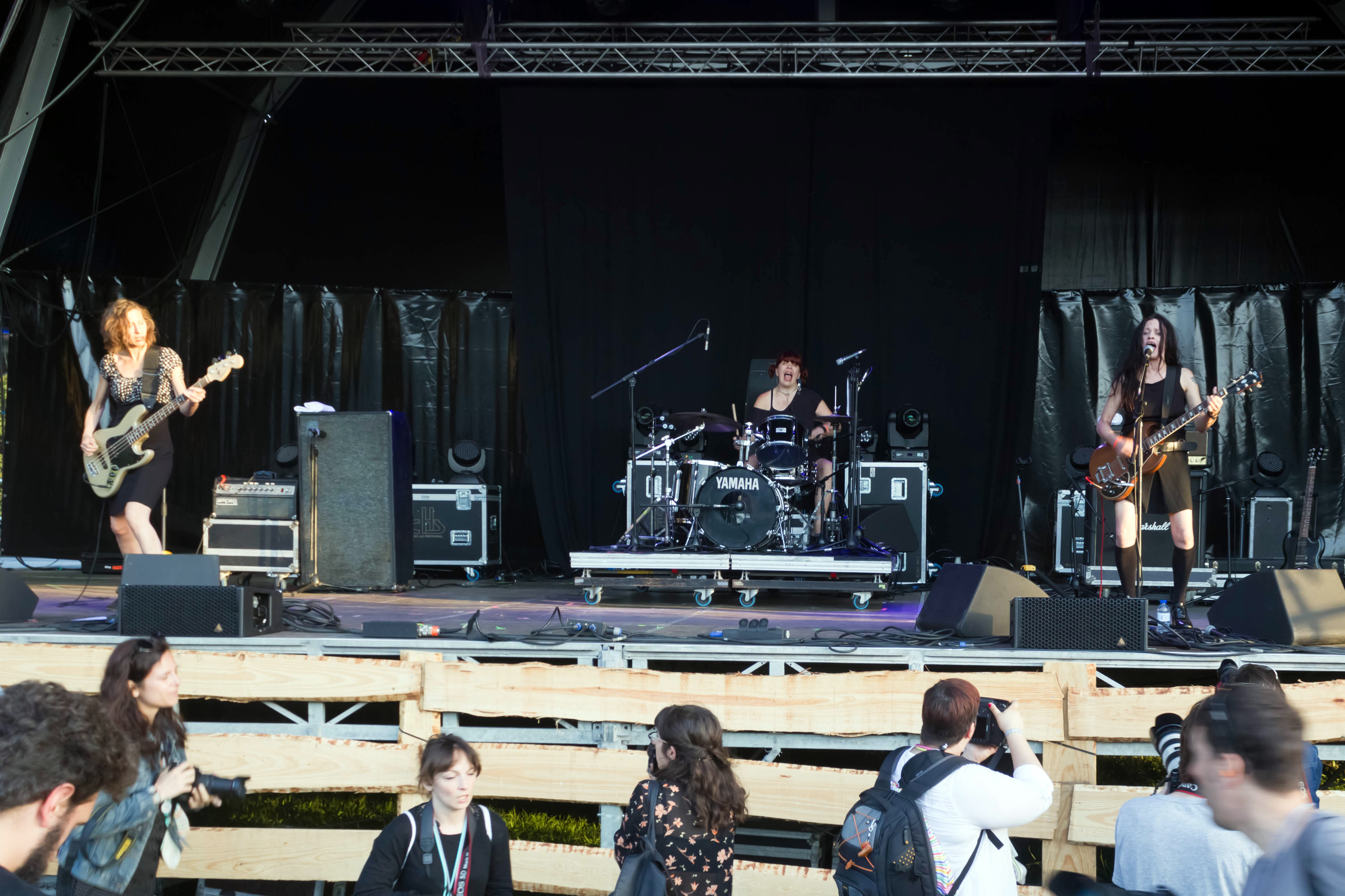
The band playing at Primavera Sound 2015 in Porto

In an interview with Lancer Radio at Pasadena College on July 26, 2014, Kat Bjelland and Maureen Herman confirmed that they were getting back together to write new material and play shows. They played their first reunion show in Pioneertown, California at Pappy And Harriet's Pioneertown Palace on February 10, 2015. They played their second show at The Roxy Theatre in Los Angeles, California on February 12, 2015. They were introduced by Tom Morello of Rage Against the Machine, who recalled his experiences performing with the band at Lollapalooza in 1993. The show's other celebrity guests included Patty Schemel, Eric Erlandson, Brody Dalle, and Donita Sparks.

The band embarked on an international tour in May 2015, beginning with shows in England, Scotland, Spain, and Italy, followed by a North American tour, which included performances at Seattle's Bumbershoot festival and the Montreal Pop festival. In Minneapolis, where the band formed, the trio played on the Walker Art Center's lawn for the two-day Rock the Garden festival, June 20–21, 2015.

In August 2015, midway through the band's tour, bassist Herman was fired from the band, for originally unspecified reasons, and replaced with Clara Salyer. In December 2015, Herman claimed the reason she had been asked to leave the band was due to an article she had written for the website Boing Boing on the sexual assault of Runaways bassist Jackie Fox by manager Kim Fowley in 1975 and Joan Jett's denial of having witnessed it. Herman stated that because of Barbero's business connections with Jett—namely Barbero producing an album for a band under Jett's record label, Blackheart Records—Herman was kicked out of the band. Barbero responded in a subsequent interview:

It’s just really fucked up. Kat and I have not said a bad word about her, and we wish her the best. It just makes me really sad, because we have so much history together. It’s honestly not what we wanted to happen. Do you think we wanted to fire our bass player? It’s not a fun thing to do. Two months before we let her go, Kat and I were so upset we couldn’t eat, we couldn’t sleep—we really didn’t want to do it, but we didn’t have any other choice. There are many, many, many reasons, but of course she’s making it so it’s our deal, like she did nothing wrong at all. Time heals all, but I don’t think there’s enough time for this one.

Babes In Toyland played their final show and broke up again in 2017. In May 2020, speaking on the podcast Conan Neutron's Protonic Reversal, Lori Barbero said that there was very little chance of future reunions from the band.

== Influences ==
Babes in Toyland cited influences including Cocteau Twins, the Miracle Workers, Wipers, Captain Beefheart, Charles Mingus, Leonard Cohen, Frightwig, Motörhead, Black Flag, Hüsker Dü, the Birthday Party, Sonic Youth, the Plasmatics, Girlschool, Joan Jett, Lydia Lunch, Patti Smith, the Pretenders, Pussy Galore, X-Ray Spex, Patti Smith and AC/DC.

== Legacy ==
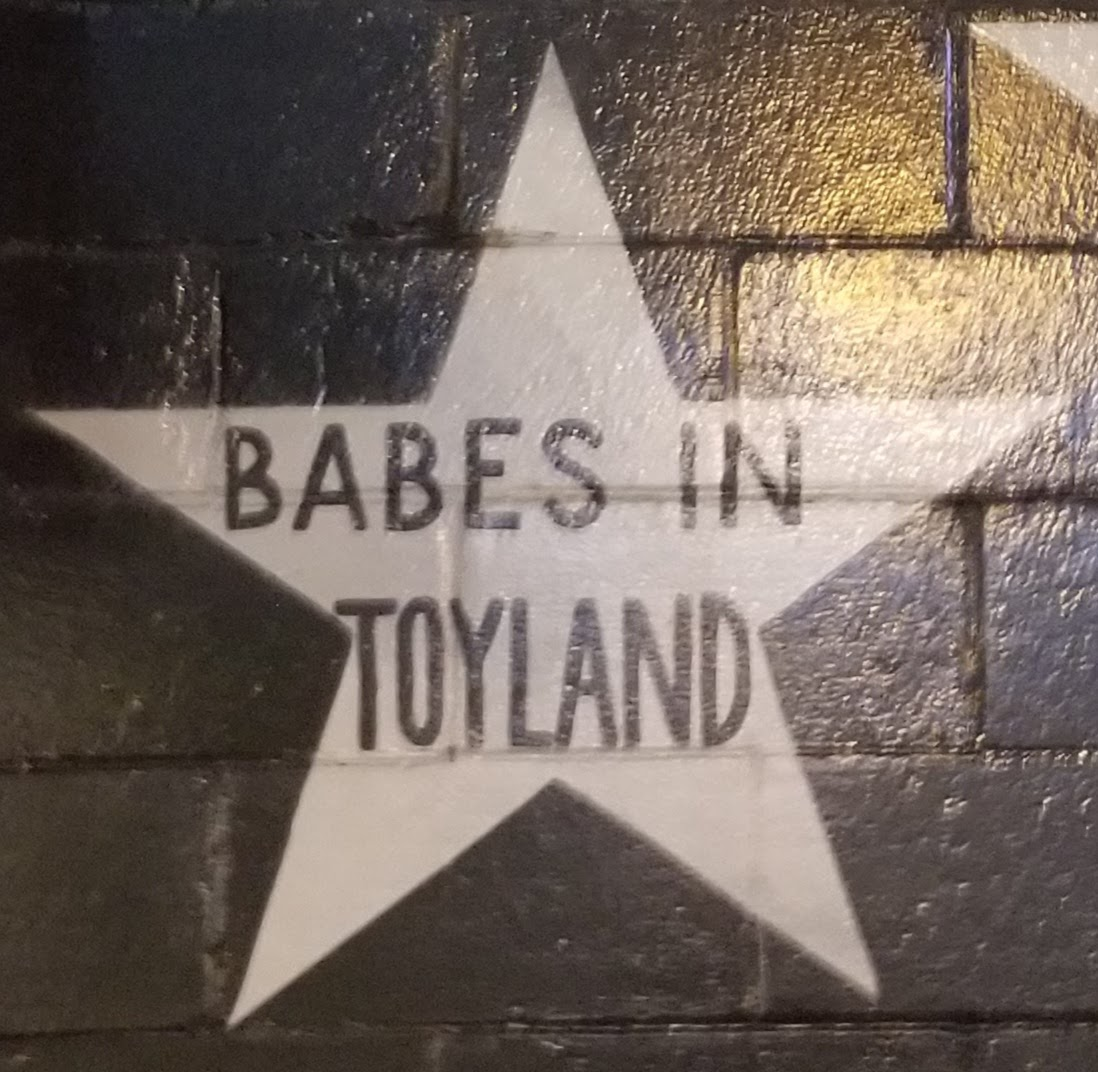
Babes in Toyland's star on the outside of Minneapolis nightclub First Avenue

Stephen Thomas Erlewine wrote of the band: "Babes in Toyland is about as harsh as rock music gets—guitarist Kat Bjelland screams and thrashes her guitar to the gut-pounding, throttling beat of bassist Maureen Herman and drummer Lori Barbero... the all-female trio offer no escape from their strongly female-oriented, but not necessarily feminist, rock." Kathleen Hanna of Bikini Kill said in a 2010 interview: "Babes in Toyland was a band that was hugely important to us and we were like, God if only we could play awesome shows like Babes in Toyland".

The band has been honored with a star on the outside mural of the Minneapolis nightclub First Avenue, recognizing performers that have played sold-out shows or have otherwise demonstrated a major contribution to the culture at the iconic venue. Receiving a star "might be the most prestigious public honor an artist can receive in Minneapolis", according to journalist Steve Marsh.

== Band members ==
=== Final lineup ===
- Kat Bjelland – lead vocals, guitar (1987–2001, 2014–2017)
- Lori Barbero – drums, backing vocals (1987–2001, 2014–2017)
- Clara Salyer – bass (2015–2017)

=== Former members ===
- Maureen Herman – bass (1992–1996, 2014–2015)
- Jessie Farmer – bass (2000–2001)
- Michelle Leon – bass (1987–1992)
- Cindy Russell – lead vocals (1987)
- Kris Holetz – bass (1987)

== Discography ==
Studio albums

- Spanking Machine (1990)
- Fontanelle (1992)
- Nemesisters (1995)

== Bibliography ==
Year	Title	Author	Publisher
1991	Babes in Toyland Lyric Book	Babes in Toyland	Twin Tone Records
1994	Babes in Toyland: The Making & Selling of a Rock & Roll Band	Neal Karlen	Avon Books
2016	I Live Inside: Memoirs of a Babe in Toyland	Michelle Leon	MNHS Press
2023	Babes In Toyland's Fontanelle	Selena Chambers	Bloomsbury Academic (33 1/3 Series)

== See also ==
- If I Were a Carpenter
- Têtes Noires

== Works cited ==
- Baldwin, Michelle (2004). Burlesque and the New Bump-n-grind. Speck Press. ISBN 978-0-972-57762-5. OCLC 711855821.
- Brite, Poppy Z. (1998). Courtney Love: The Real Story. Simon & Schuster. ISBN 978-0-684-84800-6. OCLC 37392936.
- Earles, Andrew (2014). Gimme Indie Rock. Voyageur Press. ISBN 978-1-627-88379-5. OCLC 891651577.
- Escamilla, Brian (1996). Contemporary Musicians. Gale Research, Inc. ISBN 978-0-810-39317-2. OCLC 704003291.
- Evans, Liz (1994). Women, Sex and Rock'n'roll: In Their Own Words. Pandora. ISBN 978-0-044-40900-7. OCLC 494693178.
- Gaar, Gillian G. (2002) [1992]. She's a Rebel: The History of Women in Rock and Roll (2nd ed.). Seal Press. ISBN 978-1-580-05078-4. OCLC 495287089.
- Karlen, Neil (1994). Babes in Toyland: The Making and Selling of a Rock and Roll Band. Times Books. ISBN 978-0-812-92058-1. OCLC 936867546.
- Larkin, Colin (2000). The Virgin Encyclopedia of Nineties Music. Virgin Books. ISBN 978-0-753-50427-7. OCLC 237407497.
- Leon, Michelle (2016). I Live Inside: Memoirs of a Babe in Toyland. Minnesota Historical Society. ISBN 978-0-873-51999-1. OCLC 922220168.
- St. Thomas, Kurt; Smith, Troy (2004). Nirvana: The Chosen Rejects. St. Martin's Griffin/Macmillan Press. ISBN 978-0-312-20663-5. OCLC 41368230.
- Taylor, Steve (2006). The A to X of Alternative Music. A&C Black. ISBN 978-0-826-48217-4.
- Yarm, Mark (2011). Everybody Loves Our Town: An Oral History of Grunge. New York: Three Rivers Press. ISBN 978-0-307-46444-6. OCLC 935232799.
