= Kat Bjelland =

American rock musician (born 1963)

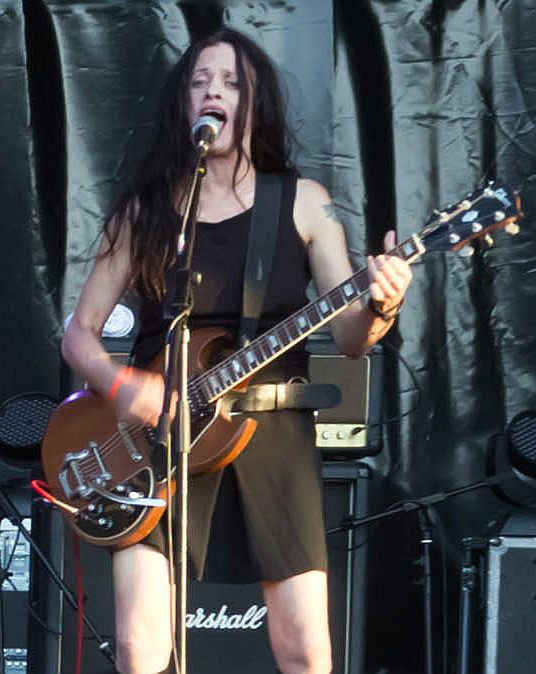
- Bjelland in 2015

Background information
- Born: Katherine Lynne Bjelland; December 9, 1963 (age 62); Salem, Oregon, U.S.
- Genres: Alternative rock; punk rock
- Occupations: Singer; musician; songwriter
- Instruments: Vocals; guitar
- Years active: 1982–2017
- Formerly of: Babes in Toyland; Katastrophy Wife; Crunt; Pagan Babies

Katherine Lynne Bjelland (/ˈbjɛlənd/; born December 9, 1963) is an American musician. She rose to prominence as the lead singer, guitarist, and songwriter of the alternative rock band Babes in Toyland, which she formed in 1987. She has been noted for her unusual vocal style alternately consisting of shrill screams, whispering, and speaking in tongues, as well as for her guitar playing style, which incorporates "jagged" tones with "psychotic rockabilly rhythms".

Born in Salem, Oregon, Bjelland was raised in nearby Woodburn, and learned to play guitar as a teenager from her uncle, in whose band she performed shortly after graduating high school. Upon dropping out of the University of Oregon at age nineteen, Bjelland relocated to Portland, where she became involved in the city's punk rock scene. There, she became friends with Courtney Love, and formed the band Pagan Babies.

After the dissolution of Pagan Babies in 1985, Bjelland relocated to Minneapolis, where she formed Babes in Toyland with drummer Lori Barbero. The band's debut record, Spanking Machine, was released in 1990, after which they toured Europe with Sonic Youth. This was followed by their second album, Fontanelle (1992). The band would release their third studio album, Nemesisters, in 1995. In the mid-late 1990s, Bjelland collaborated on other musical projects, including contributing as a bassist in the band Crunt with her then-husband, Australian musician Stuart Gray.

Babes in Toyland formally disbanded in 2001, and Bjelland began working with Katastrophy Wife, a project under which she released the albums Amusia (2001) and All Kneel (2004). She remained out of the public light for several years before publicly revealing in 2007 that she had been diagnosed with schizoaffective disorder. In 2015, she reunited with Babes in Toyland and began touring internationally for the first time in over a decade. Bjelland later retired in 2017.

== Biography ==
=== 1963–1981: Early life ===
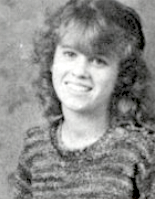
Bjelland's yearbook photo, 1981

Katherine Lynne Bjelland was born on December 9, 1963, in Salem, Oregon, to Lynne Irene Bjelland (née Higginbotham). She is of English and German descent. Bjelland was raised by her mother and stepfather, Lyle Bjelland, until age 3, when her mother separated from her stepfather and gave him full custody, after which he raised her as his own. She was not made aware of her biological father until age 18, and did not meet him until age 23. "[It] was weird", Bjelland recalled of the revelation. "I was like, 'Huh? I have a different dad? I'm not Norwegian?!'"

Bjelland was raised in Woodburn, a small town north of Salem, which she described as "predominantly Orthodox Russians and Hispanics, so being white [was] more like being a minority... We lived at the edge of town, so there was complete wilderness behind us." Bjelland's stepfather subsequently remarried, after which she claimed to have been physically and verbally abused by his wife. "You know, I really hate to talk about it because she's great now, but in my childhood she was very abusive", Bjelland said. "It probably did help my creativity a lot [though]. I was always grounded. I hate to talk about it because I feel like she doesn't think that she did it, but she was [abusive] and it influenced my life quite a great deal."

Bjelland became interested in music as a young child, and began listening to rock and roll records. As an adolescent, she became enamored with Rush, and attended four of their concerts. She also cited Kiss, Cheap Trick, The B-52's, the Plasmatics, and Captain Beefheart among her favorite artists while growing up. Her uncle, David Higginbotham, taught Bjelland to play guitar in her youth. Her first performance was at a small bar in Woodburn called Flight 99, playing with her uncle in a band called The Neurotics.

She attended Woodburn High School, where she played on the school basketball team and was a cheerleader. After graduating from high school in 1982, Bjelland briefly enrolled at the University of Oregon, but dropped out after her freshman year and relocated to Portland at age nineteen. During this time, Bjelland worked as a stripper to support herself. She became introduced to punk music after attending a Wipers concert in Portland: "I didn't know about punk rock that much", she recalled. "I was from a small town. All of a sudden I was like, 'What the fuck is this?'".

=== 1982–1986: Early musical projects ===
At age nineteen, Bjelland purchased her first guitar, a Rickenbacker 425, from a pawn shop for $200. In Woodburn, she joined The Neurotics, and then an all-female band called The Venarays, which Bjelland has described as "rock with a '60s edge". The Neurotics were composed of Bjelland (rhythm guitar); her uncle David Higginbotham (lead guitar); Marty Wyman (vocals); Brian McMillan (drums); and Laura Robertson (bass). Commenting on the band, she said: "After The Neurotics I got this band together with my best friends, so it was an all-girl band. We were called The Venarays. The name came from the [Latin] word venary which means "actively hunting out sex"! We began as a way of having fun with each other." The band, however, was not exclusively female, as drummer Dave Hummel, and later, Jack Rhodes, were men. The band name bears similarity to Vena Ray, a character from the early 1950s program Rocky Jones, Space Ranger.

After quitting The Venarays, Bjelland met Courtney Love in 1984 at the Satyricon, a Portland nightclub, and the two started a band called Sugar Babydoll. They relocated to San Francisco in 1985, after which they were joined in the group by drummer Suzanne Ramsey, and bassist Jennifer Finch. Bjelland recalled: "We went through a few names, and we only played a couple of shows. It was the smallest thing I've ever done musically." The group was inspired by Frightwig, an all-female band from the San Francisco Bay area. After Finch left the group, they renamed themselves the Pagan Babies and introduced Deirdre Schletter and Janis Tanaka, releasing a four-track demo in December 1985 before disbanding. Love went on to form the band Hole in 1989, while Finch would be part of L7.

=== 1987–2001: Babes in Toyland ===
Hoping to form a new band, Bjelland relocated from Portland to Minneapolis around 1986, and shortly after met Lori Barbero, a bartender, at a barbecue. She convinced Barbero to play in her band as a drummer, despite the fact that Barbero had no musical training. Barbero agreed, and the pair joined with bassist Michelle Leon, forming Babes in Toyland. Bjelland has said she intentionally sought out bandmates who had no instrumental experience: "Lori didn't know how to play when I met her. Michelle didn't know how to play. I was self-taught. Hopefully, from being technically inexperienced, you can use your imagination, and play the drums like an instrument instead of just being a beat-keeper. And play the bass like you feel it, from your gut, instead of saying, 'Here's my scales.'"

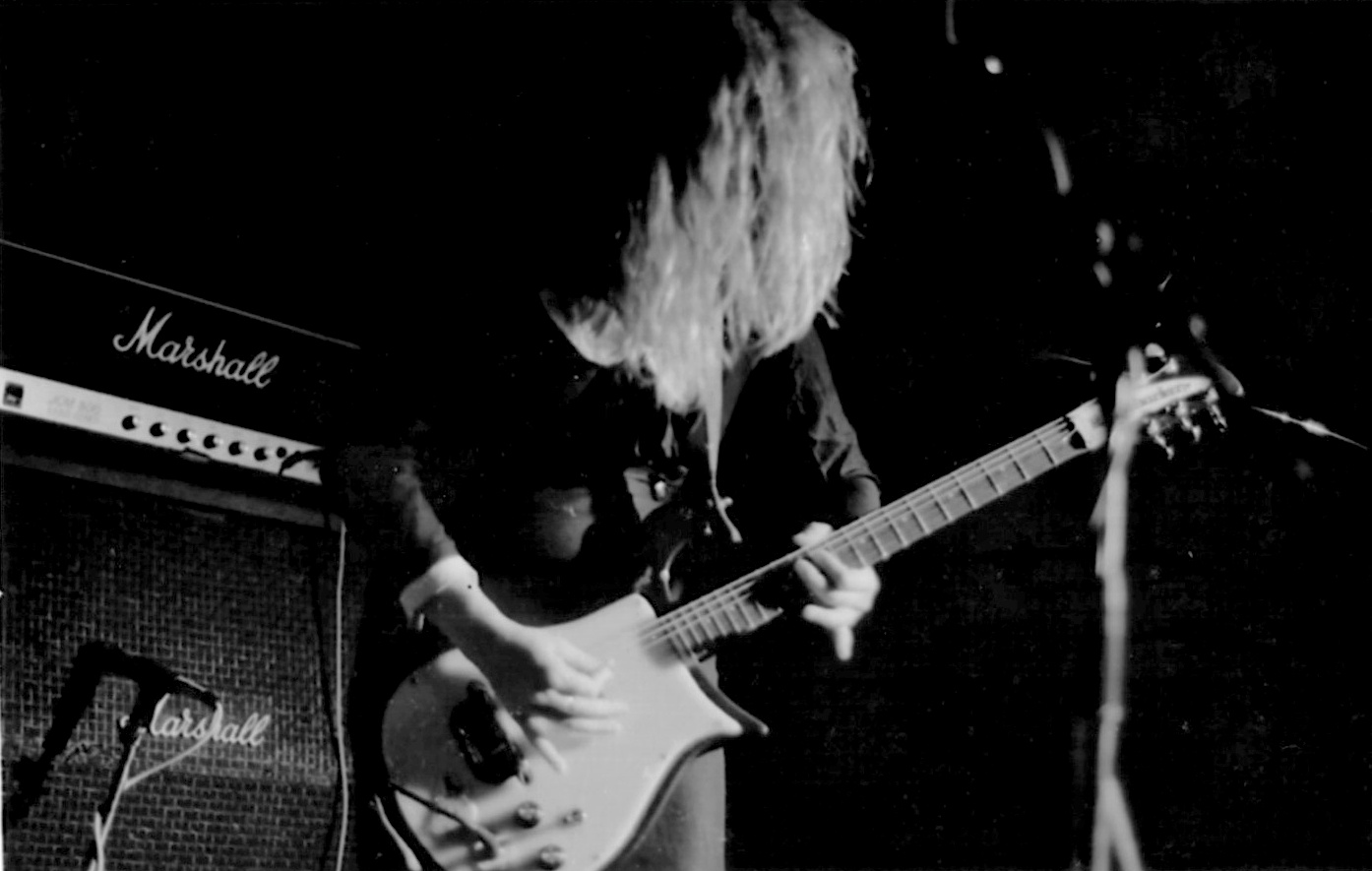
Bjelland performing with Babes in Toyland in Groningen, Netherlands, 1991

The band recorded their first extended play, To Mother, in London in 1990, titled in honor of Bjelland's mother, who she had discovered died of pancreatic cancer on the first day of the recording sessions. After signing to Reprise Records in 1991, Babes in Toyland's debut single, "Dust Cake Boy" b/w "Spit to See the Shine" was well received. After touring Europe with Sonic Youth, the band recorded their debut album Spanking Machine, which also was well- received, and was compared to the music of The Birthday Party and New York Dolls. The group would become misidentified as part of the riot grrrl movement, though Bjelland has denied having anything to do with the movement. As she said in a 1992 interview: "I don't feel helpless or anything. I don't feel like I have to be like, "I'm a female and I can do this if I want to", cause, of course I can. I already know that, and I never felt being female hurt anything. If anything, it helped."

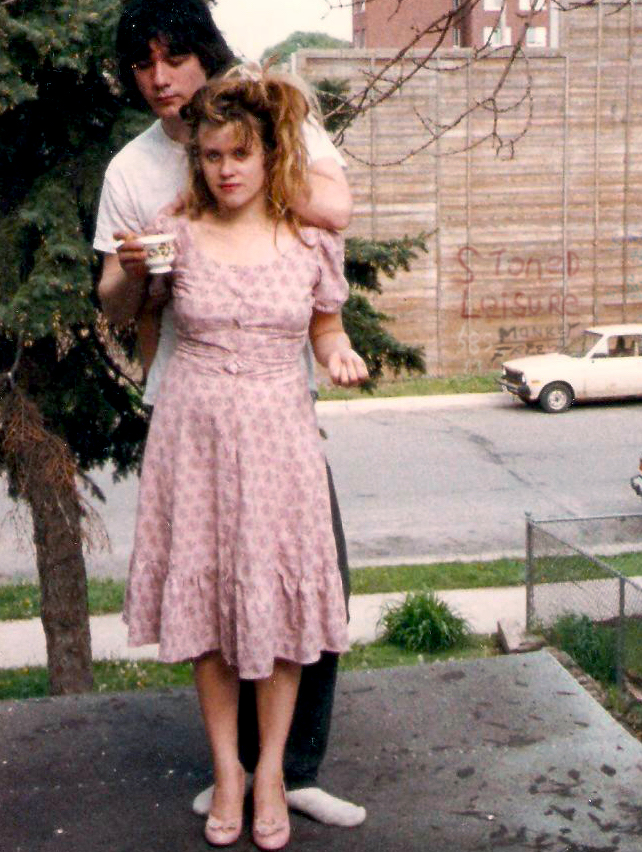
Bjelland in Minneapolis, 1992

In 1991, the band toured in Europe with Sonic Youth, which was documented in the film 1991: The Year Punk Broke. Following this, Babes in Toyland peaked in commercial success when they performed on a portion of the Lollapalooza tour in 1993, and released their second album, Fontanelle (1992), which sold over 250,000 copies. In 1994, the band was featured on the covers of Entertainment Weekly and USA Today. At the height of the band's fame, Bjelland and her former bandmate Courtney Love were often pitted against one another as rivals in media, with frequent comparisons between the two's visual appearances. According to Bjelland, the two had a falling out after Bjelland told a reporter: "Only about a quarter of what Courtney says is true. But nobody usually bothers to decipher which are the lies. She's all about image." Babes in Toyland's original bassist, Leon, claimed the rivalry between Love and Bjelland was "blown totally out of proportion", while Bjelland added in a 2011 interview: "The media did that, and it was really hurtful to me for a long time. They'd say it's some kind of battle. Which it wasn't. We were friends." Bjelland would later refer to Love as her "soul sister", commenting in a 2001 interview: "I haven't spoken to Courtney for years but soul sisters don't need to. There will always be a bond between us, regardless of whether we speak or not."

In 1993, Bjelland moved to Seattle and began a side project called Crunt with her then-husband, Australian musician Stuart Gray (also known as Stu Spasm) whom she married in 1992. Bjelland played bass and Gray guitar, while Russell Simins of Jon Spencer Blues Explosion was the drummer. In February 1994, the band released a self-titled debut, along with its first single, "Swine". During this time, Bjelland also co-wrote the track "I Think That I Would Die" on Hole's breakthrough album Live Through This (1994) with Courtney Love and guitarist Eric Erlandson. Bjelland suffered a nervous breakdown after the suicide of Kurt Cobain in 1994: "[I was in Seattle after he died] to hang out with Courtney and support her", she recalled. "In the funeral home, I saw him dead, which was more than disturbing... I had a nervous breakdown right after that." Bjelland had herself been using heroin regularly at the time, though she denied using it regularly while touring. "Let me make this clear: I never really did heroin on tour", she said in 2011. "When I came home and was bored and depressed [and] with money, yeah, that's when I would do it." To kick her habit prior to going on tours, Bjelland would binge drink through withdrawal symptoms.

In January 1995, Bjelland and Gray divorced after two years of marriage, and Crunt disbanded. Bjelland turned her focus back to Babes in Toyland, and the group released their third and final full-length album, Nemesisters in 1995. After this, she moved to Brooklyn, New York, and contributed to the 1997 album Songs of the Witchblade: A Soundtrack to the Comic Book, for the Top Cow's comics of the same name. She composed, played and produced most of songs, with many rock and metal artists like Megadeth or Peter Steele (Type O Negative), and also collaborated with a freeform musical project called Last Frenzy in England. Around 1999, Bjelland gave birth to a son, Henry, with her former husband, drummer Glen Mattson. Babes in Toyland maintained a loyal following throughout the rest of the decade, and in November 2001, played a farewell show in Minneapolis.

=== 2002–2014: Katastrophy Wife and mental health issues ===
With Babes in Toyland only performing sporadically in the late 1990s, Bjelland started the band Katastrophy Wife in 1998 as a side project with her then-husband, drummer Glen Mattson. The band toured at venues, such as Ladyfest, worldwide, and released two albums, Amusia (2001) and All Kneel (2004). Tom Edwards of Drowned in Sound gave All Kneel a favorable review, ranking it among Bjelland's best work.

In 2002, after the dissolution of Babes in Toyland, Bjelland produced and contributed guest vocals on the album The Seven Year Itch for the band Angelica. After that band's own dissolution, Bjelland hired the drummer and bassist for an impending European tour. The new band was billed as Babes in Toyland, which resulted in Barbero threatening a lawsuit, and Bjelland ultimately scrapping the name. Bjelland later claimed that Kurt Pagan-Davies, a manager with whom she was working during this time, had been partly responsible for the decision to tour under the Babes in Toyland name, which he denied. She subsequently accused him of stealing money that belonged to her from the publishing of Katastrophy Wife's albums Amusia and All Kneel.

In 2006, on the official Katastrophy Wife website, Bjelland wrote that "Katastrophy Wife have had a few incarnations but from here on I will only re-incarnate my self". In April 2007, the band released the single "Heart On", on the Australian record label Rish. The single was intended as a trailer for a forthcoming album, Pregnant, although as of 2020 the album has not been released. Katastrophy Wife's vinyl debut was on an Independent label compilation called The Tundra Sessions, featuring production by Tim Mac.

In 2007, Bjelland revealed she had been diagnosed with schizoaffective disorder and had been institutionalized for a period. She commented on the event, saying: "I don't know how I've progressed musically as such but a major influence in my writing was dealing with my whole schizophrenia episode. I actually haven't spoken to anyone much about this. Dealing with multiple personalities was extremely difficult because some days I didn't know who I was or where I was at. I was very lucky that Adrian (Johnson, her partner and manager) stuck by and helped me through it all. So obviously that was going to affect some of what I wrote about."

=== 2015–2020: Babes in Toyland reunion and breakup ===
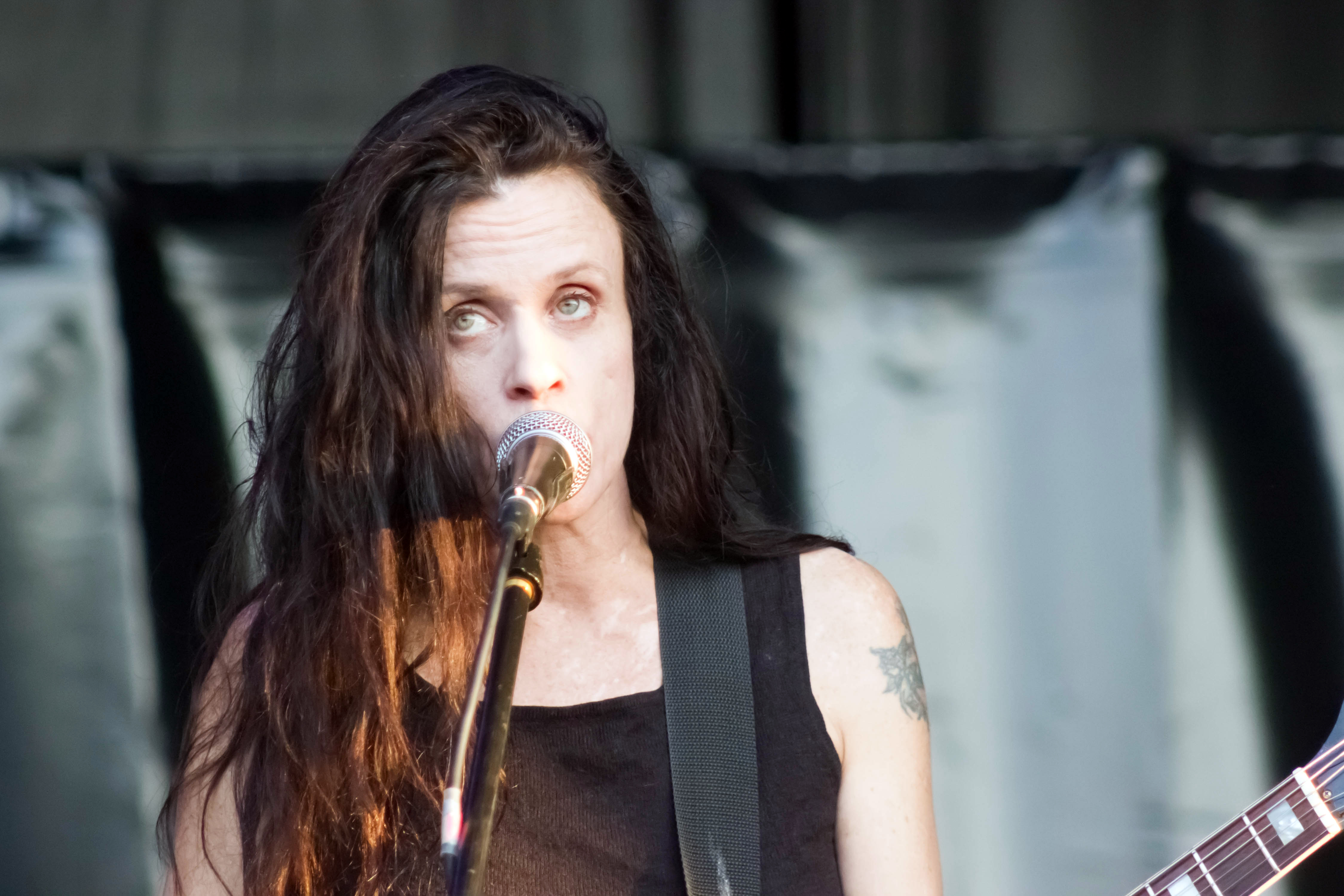
Bjelland performing at Primavera Sound with Babes in Toyland, 2015

In 2014, Bjelland reunited with former bandmates Maureen Herman and Lori Barbero and began rehearsing to perform live shows. "People would show me on the Internet all these young fans who wanted to see us, and I felt kind of obligated to play", said Bjelland. "You see people with their moms and even grandmothers coming to the shows together. It's super cool. I'm just surprised at how much people still like it." In February 2015, the band played their first live show together in fourteen years in Joshua Tree, California, and performed additional shows on an international tour throughout 2015. Bjelland commented that she intended to write new material, but that it would be concerned with "less anger about people. Now it's about things that are going on in the world. I've got a whole plethora of songs ready to go."

Babes in Toyland later broke up in 2020, having played their last show in 2017. Bjelland subsequently retired from performing.

== Musical style ==
=== Influences ===
As a child, Bjelland's favorite band was Rush, particularly their fourth album 2112. "It was kind of a band that girls didn't like, just guys liked them... I liked them because they had weird, spacey other-land lyrics, and lots of breaks, and really cool instrumentation", she said. As an adolescent, she also listened to popular rock bands such as Kiss and Cheap Trick. She would later credit Cocteau Twins, The Miracle Workers, and the Wipers as early influences, and also said she listened to Billie Holiday as a teenager. As an adult, Bjelland named Captain Beefheart, Charles Mingus, Leonard Cohen, Frightwig, Girlschool, Motörhead, and other '70s bands as important to her.

=== Voice and instrumentation ===
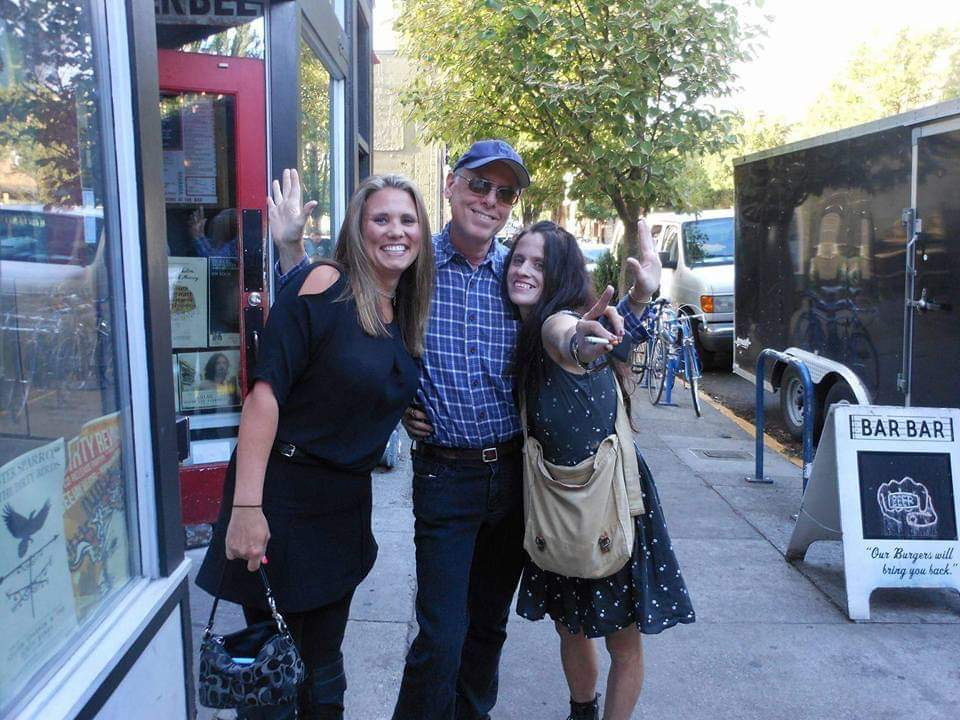
Bjelland (right) learned to play guitar from her uncle, David Higginbotham (center), a local musician in Kat's hometown of Woodburn, Oregon

Bjelland has been noted by music critics for her unique screaming vocals, which have been likened to those of Ozzy Osbourne and Diamanda Galás. Journalist Richard Cromelin noted in a 1992 Los Angeles Times profile that "She retches her enraged lyrics, her screams skid across the beat and collide with the blunt riffs. Her voice erupts into laughs and gargles, then croons down low with eerie detachment." She has also incorporated speaking in tongues in several songs.

Commenting on her musical aspirations, Bjelland said: "It should sound like nothing that you've heard before. That's my intention... Like my singing, all I try to do is I just push myself into things where I think I can't reach notes and stuff. Sometimes it sounds really ridiculous, but then you just kind of work on it." A 2015 concert review described her voice as one so powerful that it "can strip the chrome off a bumper".

In Babes in Toyland, Bjelland's instrumentation and songwriting has been described as "ugly, crunching post-punk" supplemented by "rudimentary" guitar chords. She learned to play guitar from her uncle, David Higginbotham, with whom she played in his band, The Neurotics, prior to forming Babes in Toyland. Commenting on her guitar playing, Bjelland said: "I think it's not the quantity but the quality, and I don't think it's the speed you play, it's the soul that comes out." In an interview with John Peel, she revealed that she had never played with an effects pedal until 1993: "If you learn how to play without effects, you have to learn how to make your guitar speak instead of the electronics."

== Discography ==
Babes in Toyland

- Spanking Machine (1990)
- Fontanelle (1992)
- Nemesisters (1995)

Crunt

- Crunt (1994)

Katastrophy Wife

- Amusia (2001)
- All Kneel (2004)

== Sources ==
- Baldwin, Michelle (2004). Burlesque and the New Bump-n-grind. Denver, Colorado: Speck Press. ISBN 978-0-972-57762-5. OCLC 711855821.
- Brite, Poppy Z. (1998). Courtney Love: The Real Story. New York: Simon & Schuster. ISBN 978-0-684-84800-6. OCLC 37392936.
- Earles, Andrew (2014). Gimme Indie Rock. Minneapolis, Minnesota: Voyageur Press. ISBN 978-1-627-88379-5. OCLC 891651577.
- Escamilla, Brian (1996). Contemporary Musicians. Gale Research, Inc. ISBN 978-0-810-39317-2. OCLC 704003291.
- Evans, Liz (1994). Women, Sex and Rock'n'roll: In Their Own Words. London: Pandora. ISBN 978-0-044-40900-7. OCLC 494693178.
- Gaar, Gillian G. (2002) [1992]. She's a Rebel: The History of Women in Rock and Roll (2nd ed.). New York: Seal Press. ISBN 978-1-580-05078-4. OCLC 495287089.
- Karlen, Neil (1994). Babes in Toyland: The Making and Selling of a Rock and Roll Band. New York: Times Books. ISBN 978-0-812-92058-1. OCLC 936867546.
- Larkin, Colin (2000). The Virgin Encyclopedia of Nineties Music. London: Virgin Books. ISBN 978-0-753-50427-7. OCLC 237407497.
- Leon, Michelle (2016). I Live Inside: Memoirs of a Babe in Toyland. Minneapolis, Minnesota: Minnesota Historical Society. ISBN 978-0-873-51999-1. OCLC 922220168.
- Ogg, Alex (2000). Natural Babe Killers (CD liner notes). Babes in Toyland. United Kingdom: Snapper Music. OCLC 45369341.
- St. Thomas, Kurt; Smith, Troy (2004). Nirvana: The Chosen Rejects. New York: St. Martin's Griffin. ISBN 978-0-312-20663-5. OCLC 41368230.
- Yarm, Mark (2011). Everybody Loves Our Town: An Oral History of Grunge. New York: Three Rivers Press. ISBN 978-0-307-46444-6. OCLC 935232799.
