= Lori Barbero =

American musician and singer (born 1961)

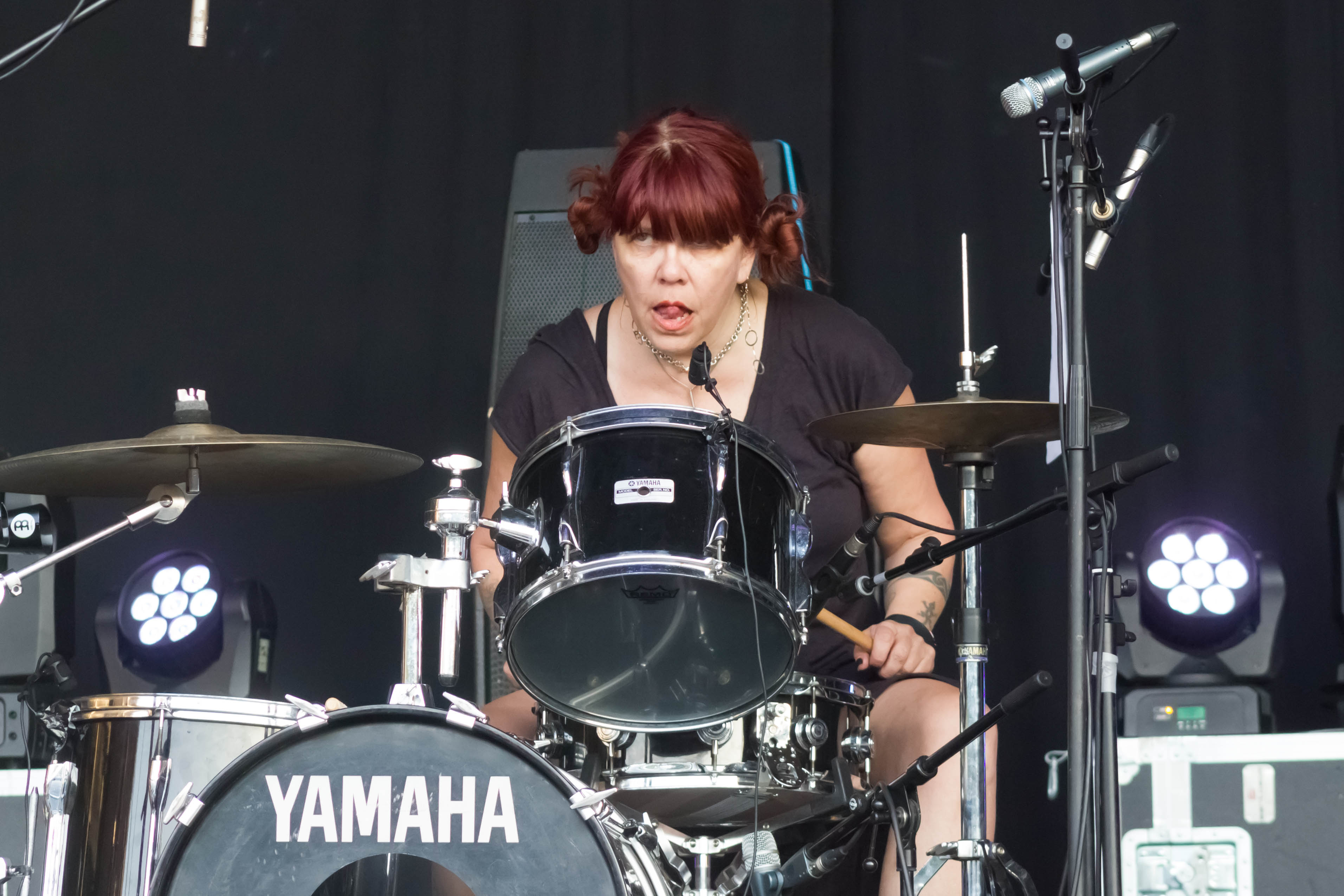
- Barbero in 2015

Background information
- Born: Lori Anne Barbero; November 27, 1961 (age 64); Minneapolis, Minnesota, United States
- Genres: Alternative rock; punk rock
- Occupation: Musician
- Instruments: Drums; vocals
- Years active: 1987–present

Lori Anne Barbero (born November 27, 1961) is an American musician. She rose to prominence as the drummer of the alternative rock band Babes in Toyland, which she formed in 1987. After the dissolution of Babes in Toyland in 2001, Barbero subsequently played drums for bands such as Eggtwist and Koalas. In 2015, she reunited with Babes in Toyland and embarked on an international tour before disbanding again in 2020.

== Early life ==
Barbero was born in Minneapolis on November 27, 1961. She is of Filipino and Scandinavian descent. When she was 14 years old, her father moved the family to Pearl River, New York, where she attended high school, graduating in 1978.

During her teenage years, Barbero often ventured into New York City to attend concerts, specifically at CBGB, which exposed her to a wide array of bands: "From where my house was—we lived on a hill—I could see New York. So I went into the city a lot, and I saw a lot of music," Barbero recalled. "I liked music that was probably not as acceptable to a lot of ears as it was to mine. In high school, I loved David Bowie and I loved Queen. I remember going to the city and seeing a lot of punk stuff, [like] the Tubes and Patti Smith, and the New York Dolls. I was pretty lucky because it was just part of my life."

After high school, Barbero moved to Key West, Florida, before returning to Minneapolis, where she attended the University of Minnesota before dropping out and working as a waitress.

== Career ==
Barbero had never played a musical instrument prior to joining Babes in Toyland, but had always wanted to learn to play drums. Upon meeting Kat Bjelland at a barbecue in the mid-1980s, Bjelland asked her to start a band with her.

After the dissolution of Babes in Toyland in the early 2000s, Barbero worked as a music manager, and for a time was Courtney Love's assistant during the recording of America's Sweetheart (2004), beginning in 2002. She was subsequently employed by the South by Southwest Music Festival in Austin, Texas, as an assistant production manager for a total of seven years, beginning in the late 2000s. She was also part-owner of the now defunct Minneapolis label Spanish Fly Records, whose roster included Smut, Dumpster Juice, Milk, REO Speedealer, Sleep Capsule, and Likehell.

Lori contributed to a zine called After Grrrl (Small Stories From Big Lives) in 2015. The zine included stories from many influential female artists, icons, and taste makers including Allison Wolfe, Camille Rose Garcia, Tara McPherson, Kelly Osbourne, Bonnie Burton, Remy Holwick, Jessicka, Janine Jarman, as well as many others.

== Personal life ==
As of 2014, Barbero divided her time between Minneapolis and Austin, Texas.

== Sources ==
- Gaar, Gillian G. (2002) [1992]. She's a Rebel: The History of Women in Rock and Roll (2nd ed.). Seal Press. ISBN 978-1-580-05078-4. OCLC 495287089.
- Leon, Michelle (2016). I Live Inside: Memoirs of a Babe in Toyland. Minnesota Historical Society. ISBN 978-0-873-51999-1. OCLC 922220168.
- Neutron, Conan; Barbero, Lori (May 24, 2020). "Episode 166: Lori Barbero". Conan Neutron's Protonic Reversal (Podcast). Archived from the original on 2021-12-19 – via YouTube.
