= On the Slide =

On The Slide

Studio album by The Figgs
- Released: 13 May 2016
- Genre: Rock; garage rock; pop rock
- Length: 35:19
- Label: Stomper
- Producer: The Figgs

The Figgs chronology
Other Planes Of Here (2015)	On The Slide (2016)

Professional ratings
Review scores
Source	Rating
AllMusic	0/5 stars

On the Slide, the 13th studio album by the American rock band The Figgs, was released on May 13, 2016 on Stomper, a year after their acclaimed Other Planes Of Here. It was recorded and mixed by Ducky Carlisle, Pete Donnelly, and Mike Gent at Ice Station Zebra, Soundcheck Republic, Moontower, and Westmont Station. Guests include longtime Figgs collaborators John Powhida and Ted Collins. On the Slide was rated one of the Top 10 Local Albums of 2016 by The Daily Gazette.

== Track listing ==
No.	Title	Writer(s)	Length
1.	"Back at the Start"	Pete Donnelly	4:18
2.	"Connecting Brains"	Mike Gent	2:15
3.	"The Go Getter"	Gent; Donnelly	3:46
4.	"Your Smile Is a Deadly Thing"	Donnelly	4:20
5.	"Reckoning"	Gent	3:36
6.	"Gimmicks"	Gent	2:36
7.	"Just the Facts"	Gent; Donnelly	4:37
8.	"Open G Capo Position 3"	Gent	2:57
9.	"The Healer"	Donnelly	3:17
10.	"On The Slide"	Gent	3:37
