= Slow Charm =

Studio album by The Figgs
- Released: 10 September 2002
- Genre: Rock; garage rock; pop rock
- Length: 37:30
- Label: Hearbox/Good Land
- Producer: Tim O'Heir; The Figgs

The Figgs chronology
Sucking In Stereo (2000)	Slow Charm (2002)	Palais (2004)

Professional ratings
Review scores
Source	Rating
AllMusic	3.5/5 stars

Slow Charm is the seventh studio album by the American rock band The Figgs. It was released on September 10, 2002 by Hearbox/Good Land. Slow Charm was recorded and mixed between May 2001 and March 2002 at Peligro Audio-NYC, Green St. House-NH, Bricktown-Norristown, PA, and The Amazing Barn-Conshaken, PA. It was produced by Tim O’Heir, Pete Donnelly, and The Figgs and mixed by Donnelly, Dave Minehan, and Mike Gent at Minehan's Wooly Mammoth-Boston, MA.

== Track listing ==
Side one
No.	Title	Writer(s)	Length
1.	"Intro #1"		0:36
2.	"Back to Being"	Pete Donnelly	3:08
3.	"Sit and Shake"	Mike Gent	2:17
4.	"There are never two alike"	Gent	3:05
5.	"Soon"	Gent; Pete Hayes	3:44
6.	"Public Transportation"	Donnelly	3:08
7.	"Static"	Donnelly	2:38

Side two
No.	Title	Writer(s)	Length
8.	"Intro #2"		0:13
9.	"Metal Detector"	Gent	2:14
10.	"Lose the Pain"	Donnelly	2:13
11.	"The Trench"	Donnelly	2:46
12.	"Protocol"	Gent	3:43
13.	"Slow Charm"	Gent	3:46
14.	"Are You Still Mine?"	Donnelly	3:59
