= I Could Break Your Heart Any Day of the Week =

Single by Mandy Moore

from the album Amanda Leigh
- Released: April 1, 2009
- Length: 2:53
- Label: Storefront Records
- Songwriters: Mandy Moore; Mike Viola
- Producer: Mike Viola

Mandy Moore singles chronology
"Nothing That You Are" (2007)	"I Could Break Your Heart Any Day of the Week" (2009)	"Wind in My Hair" (2017)

Audio video
- "I Could Break Your Heart Any Day of the Week" on YouTube

"I Could Break Your Heart Any Day of the Week" is a song by American recording artist Mandy Moore from her fifth studio album, Amanda Leigh. It was released on June 15, 2009 by Storefront Records as the lead single of the album. The song was written by Moore and Mike Viola.

== Release and promotion ==
Moore has promoted the song in many places, such as:

- The Ellen DeGeneres Show on May 26, 2009
- The Tonight Show with Jay Leno
- Amoeba Music Hollywood
- Late Night with Jimmy Fallon

== Music video ==
The music video premiered on Monday, April 20, 2009, on Yahoo! Music.

== Charts ==
Chart performance for "I Could Break Your Heart Any Day of the Week"
Chart (2014)	Peak position
Ukraine (FDR Charts)	14

== Release history ==
Release dates and formats for "I Could Break Your Heart Any Day of the Week"
Region	Date	Format	Label(s)	Ref.
United States	June 15, 2009	Mainstream airplay	Storefront	
