= Let's Get Serious =

Let's Get Serious may refer to:

- Let's Get Serious (Candy Butchers EP), a 1999 EP by Mike Viola & the Candy Butchers
- Let's Get Serious (Jermaine Jackson album), 1980
- "Let's Get Serious" (song), the title track from the Jermaine Jackson album
- Let's Get Serious (Party Fun Action Committee album), a 2003 album from Party Fun Action Committee
