= Banda Macho =

Studio album by the Figgs
- Released: 1996
- Studio: Mixolydian
- Genre: Alternative rock, power pop
- Label: Capitol
- Producer: Eric Rachel, the Figgs

The Figgs chronology
Low-Fi at Society High (1994)	Banda Macho (1996)	The Last Rock 'n' Roll Tour (1997)

Banda Macho is an album by the American band the Figgs, released in 1996. The Figgs supported the album by touring with Graham Parker, opening his shows and serving as the backing band for his set. They also played Warped Tour 1996.

"Girl, Kill Your Boyfriend" was the album's first single. Banda Macho is the Figgs' best selling album.

== Production ==
The album was produced by Eric Rachel and the band. It was mixed at Sony Music Studios. The band had recorded several of the songs as much as a year before the release of the album.

== Critical reception ==
Professional ratings
Review scores
Source	Rating
AllMusic	3/5 stars
MusicHound Rock: The Essential Album Guide	3/5 stars
The San Diego Union-Tribune	2.5/4 stars
The Tampa Tribune	3/4 stars

Trouser Press deemed the album "another solid effort of revved-up guitar pop rooted loosely in the Kinks and Costello." CMJ New Music Monthly called the music "power pop," writing that "like the Replacements' Pleased to Meet Me, Banda Macho lands hit after hit." The Washington Post wrote: "Befitting its half-joking title, Macho is tougher and noisier than its predecessor, Low-Fi at Society High ... the Figgs can be jokey, but the band's shapely tunes and three-part harmonies usually outstrip the gags."

The Telegram & Gazette declared Banda Macho to be a "wry and well-played outing of two-to-three-minute pop gems, not really punk, nor the type of brilliantly arranged stuff other pop rockers try to write ... The Figgs offer some sort of fuzzy middle ground that gives the band a true collective personality." The Tampa Tribune wrote that "would-be standard issue punk is saved by enthusiasm, an ear for melody and a knack for Beatlesque chord changes." The Chicago Tribune thought that the album "evokes everyone from the Ramones to AC/DC to the Kinks."

== Track listing ==
No.	Title	Length
1.	"Blame It All Senseless"
2.	"Mold"
3.	"Bad Luck Sammie"
4.	"Supreme Fashion"
5.	"Hey! Mr. Moonman"
6.	"Girl, Kill Your Boyfriend"
7.	"FTMU"
8.	"Slugwig"
9.	"Choker"
10.	"Reject"
11.	"Red Bank Queen"
12.	"This Copy's Mine"
13.	"Another View"
14.	"Dandruff (You've Got a Lot of Friends)"
15.	"Powder King"
16.	"Kiss Off Baby"
17.	"Every Night"
