= In Real Life (album) =

Studio album by Mandy Moore
- Released: May 13, 2022
- Genre: Indie pop; country
- Length: 40:42
- Label: Verve Forecast
- Producer: Mike Viola

Mandy Moore chronology
Silver Landings (2020)	In Real Life (2022)

Singles from In Real Life
- 1. "In Real Life" Released: March 8, 2022; 2. "Little Dreams" Released: April 5, 2022; 3. "Four Moons" Released: June 6, 2022

In Real Life is the seventh studio album by American singer-songwriter Mandy Moore, released on May 13, 2022, via Verve Forecast Records. The album is a follow-up to her sixth studio album, Silver Landings (2020).

== Background ==
Following the birth of her first child with husband and Dawes frontman Taylor Goldsmith in February 2021, Moore returned to the studio to record new music that she wrote with her husband during the COVID-19 pandemic. Moore also worked with longtime producer Mike Viola, Dawes drummer Griffin Goldsmith, Dawes keyboardist Lee Pardini, guitarists Madison Cunningham and Sean Watkins, bassists Davey Faragher and Sebastian Steinberg, and Jess Wolfe and Holly Laessig of Lucius.

== Promotion ==
Moore released a short clip on Instagram of an acoustic version of "In Real Life", the first song in the new album, which she performed with her husband in an Instagram reel on March 6, 2022. Three days later, on March 9, she announced in an Instagram post that the song would also become the title of the album and that it was the result of "digging some creative catharsis during quarantine and getting ready to become a mother." On March 18, the music video for "In Real Life" was published on Moore's YouTube channel, which featured her son, her husband, as well as celebrity friends and the cast of the NBC drama This Is Us, where Moore is one of the main cast.

During a guest appearance in The Tonight Show Starring Jimmy Fallon on May 11, Moore announced a North American tour to promote the album beginning in Atlanta, Georgia. After 12 gigs, the rest of the tour was cancelled due to her pregnancy.

== Critical reception ==
Professional ratings
Review scores
Source	Rating
AllMusic	3.5/5 stars
Riff Magazine	8/10

In Real Life received generally positive reviews from music critics. AllMusic gave the album a positive rating of three and a half stars and stated in its review: "Where its predecessor was filled with songs of rebirth and empowerment, In Real Life is gentler, concentrating on domestic warmth where the partners are healthy enough to know how to meet in the middle -- a compromise that becomes essential with a new baby entering the family." It added, "It's a welcoming, cheery sound that matches Moore's optimism, but it's hard not to wish there was an occasional loose end or ragged fringe."

Writing for Riff Magazine, Mike DeWald said of the album: "In Real Life showcases Moore's growth and maturity as both a songwriter and performer. The album is fun and breezy, but most importantly, it feels authentic to her personal experience."

== Track listing ==
All music is produced by Mike Viola.

In Real Life track listing
No.	Title	Writer(s)	Length
1.	"In Real Life"	Mandy Moore; Viola; Taylor Goldsmith	3:52
2.	"Heartlands"	Moore; Goldsmith; Madison Love; Matthew Koma	3:34
3.	"Little Dreams"	Moore; Viola; Goldsmith; Sam Farrar	3:27
4.	"Just Maybe"	Moore; Viola; Goldsmith	3:48
5.	"Living in the in Between"	Moore; Viola; Goldsmith	3:01
6.	"In Other Words"	Moore; Viola; Goldsmith; Morgan Kibby	4:10
7.	"Four Moons"	Moore; Viola; Goldsmith; Farrar	3:35
8.	"Little Victories"	Moore; Viola; Goldsmith; Koma	3:52
9.	"Heavy Lifting"	Moore; Viola; Goldsmith	3:42
10.	"Brand New Nowhere"	Moore; Viola; Goldsmith; Koma	3:17
11.	"Every Light"	Moore; Goldsmith	4:19
Total length:			40:42

Target bonus tracks
No.	Title	Writer(s)	Length
12.	"Something to Do with Loneliness"	Inara George; Moore; Viola; Goldsmith	4:08
13.	"Little Dreams" (demo)	Moore; Viola; Goldsmith; Sam Farrar	3:24
Total length:			48:14

== Personnel ==
Credits adapted from AllMusic.

- Mandy Moore – vocals, composer
- Taylor Goldsmith – composer, guitar (acoustic), guitar (electric), piano, vocals
- Mike Viola – arranger, bass, composer, drums, engineer, guitar (acoustic), guitar (electric), keyboards, percussion, piano, producer, vocals
- Griffin Goldsmith – drums, percussion
- Dave Cerminara – engineer, mixing
- Gal Petel – mixing assistant
- Eric Boulanger – mastering
- Madison Cunningham – guitar (electric)
- Sean Watkins – guitar (acoustic)
- Davey Faraghar – bass
- Sebastian Steinberg – bass
- Lee Pardini – hammond B3, keyboards, piano
- Trey Pollard – conductor, string arrangements
- Adrian Olsen – string engineer
- Anna Bishop – violin
- Alana Carithers – violin
- Jeannette Jang – violin
- Stacy Matthews – violin
- Adrian Pintea – violin
- Meredith Riley – violin
- Jocelyn Smith – violin
- Treesa Gold – string contractor, violin
- Ryan Lannan – cello
- Elizabeth OHara – viola
- Molly Sharp – viola
- Susy Yim – viola
- Jess Wolfe – vocals
- Inara George – vocals
- Holly Laessig – vocals

== Charts ==
Chart performance for In Real Life
Chart (2022)	Peak position
US Top Album Sales (Billboard)	41
