= Falling into Place (Candy Butchers album) =

Studio album by Mike Viola and the Candy Butchers
- Released: August 24, 1999
- Genre: Pop rock
- Length: 44:53
- Label: Sony/RPM Records

Mike Viola and the Candy Butchers chronology
Let's Get Serious (1999)	Falling into Place (1999)	Let's Get Christmas (1999)

Mike Viola chronology
Let's Get Serious (1999)	Falling into Place (1999)	Let's Get Christmas (1999)

Professional ratings
Review scores
Source	Rating
AllMusic	4/5 stars

Falling into Place is a studio album by Mike Viola and the Candy Butchers released in 1999.

== Track listing ==
(All songs written by Mike Viola.)

1. "Falling Into Place" - 2:58
2. "Killing Floor" - 4:05
3. "All I Have" - 2:17
4. "Too Much Going On" - 3:36
5. "Let It Ride" - 2:49
6. "Give Me Some Time" - 4:01
7. "Hills Of L.A." - 3:07
8. "I Don't Know Anything" - 2:37
9. "Can't We Do Anything Right" - 2:28
10. "Stop When It Hurts" - 2:56
11. "Doing It The Wrong Way" - 2:26
12. "Break Your Heart" - 3:28
13. "Fall Back Down" - 2:55
14. "Once I Was" - 5:10

== Personnel ==
- Danny Bennett: producer
- Dae Bennett: producer
- Mike Viola: vocals, guitars, producer
- Pete Donnelly: bass, vocals
- Mike Levesque: drums
- Dan Levine: trombone (on "Once I Was")
- Larry Etkin: trumpet (on "Once I Was")
- Jim O'Connor: trumpet (on "Once I Was")
- Garth Hudson: saxophone, keyboards (on "Once I Was")
