= Get Him to the Greek (soundtrack) =

2010 album by Infant Sorrow

Studio album / soundtrack album by Infant Sorrow
- Released: June 1, 2010
- Genre: Rock
- Length: 46:10 (standard); 58:44 (deluxe)
- Label: Universal Republic

Get Him to the Greek is the debut studio album by the fictional band Infant Sorrow, which also served as the soundtrack to the 2010 comedy film of the same name by Nicholas Stoller. The album released through Universal Republic Records on June 1, 2010. It features songs performed by the band along with two numbers performed by the band's frontman Aldous Snow (Russell Brand, who reprises his role from the 2008 film Forgetting Sarah Marshall) and Jackie Q (Rose Byrne).

== Development ==
The development of the film's album came through composer Lyle Workman who wanted the songs to be an independent material whose approach, structure and the recording process being "very much like doing a large-budget record of serious work". Russel Brand was also instrumental in the curation of the soundtrack which demanded songs that were "quality and quirky-like a rock version of Flight of the Conchords".

Workman and Brand partnered with Jason Segel for writing several songs and with the help of music supervisor Jonathan Karp, he collaborated with Mike Viola, Dan Bern, Jarvis Cocker, Ross Orton, Chilly Gonzales, Greg Kurstin, Inara George, Jason Buckle from the British electronic group All Seeing I, Mitch Marine from the rock band Smash Mouth, Cal Barat of the Libertines, director-producer Judd Apatow amongst several others to contribute the lyrics. They also wrote lyrics for the songs performed by Jackie Q and Snow on-screen.

== Marketing ==
Kim Garner, the senior vice president of marketing and artist development at Universal Republic Records, said that Brand and Universal Pictures "felt very strongly about doing something like this as opposed to a traditional soundtrack," and that they "wanted to release it like we would an actual rock band's album." Universal Republic curated a piece with the film company that will run through the Best Buy retail stores during the film's release and further produced special content for Record Store Day along with Union Jack Fender guitar (similar to the one that Snow uses in the film) being commissioned as a prize for a label-run contest in weekly magazines across United States. The film was further screened for retailers to expand the distribution of the soundtrack. Furthermore, a music video which Brand had directed premiered on Vevo prior to the film's release while Brand and Jonah Hill curated celebrity playlists for iTunes.

== Reception ==
Stuart Berman of Pitchfork rated the album 5.5 out of 10, summarizing that it "is built upon a more generic, vaguely defined base, so there's less fun to be had in picking out its targets". James Christopher Monger of AllMusic assigned three out of five saying "Infant Sorrow's 15-track 'debut' sounds like something fellow fictional rock star Billy Mack (played by Bill Nighy in the 2003 film Love Actually) would have put out in his Dionysian heydays." A critic from Sputnikmusic wrote "Get Him to the Greek might not have years of lasting humour, but for fans of both Russell and the film itself, it's all but icing on the comedic cake."

== Commercial performance ==
According to Nielsen SoundScan, the album had sold 3,500 copies within the first week of its release.

== Track listing ==
Get Him to the Greek – standard edition track listing
No.	Title	Lyrics	Artist	Length
1.	"Just Say Yes"	Jarvis Cocker; Jason Buckle; Tim McCall; Ross Orton	Infant Sorrow	2:18
2.	"Gang of Lust"	Carl Barat	Infant Sorrow	2:03
3.	"Furry Walls"	Dan Bern; Mike Viola; Judd Apatow	Infant Sorrow	3:07
4.	"Going Up"	Jason Segel; Lyle Workman	Infant Sorrow	4:06
5.	"Bangers, Beans and Mash"	Jason Segel; Lyle Workman	Infant Sorrow	3:32
6.	"The Clap"	Dan Bern; Mike Viola	Infant Sorrow	2:44
7.	"I Am Jesus"	Jason Segel; Lyle Workman	Infant Sorrow	2:39
8.	"Riding Daphne"	Jason Segel; Lyle Workman	Infant Sorrow	3:28
9.	"F.O.H."	Jarvis Cocker; Chilly Gonzales	Infant Sorrow	3:52
10.	"Yeah Yeah Oi Oi"	Dan Bern; Mitch Marine	Infant Sorrow	2:52
11.	"African Child (Trapped in Me)"	Mike Viola	Infant Sorrow	3:06
12.	"Little Bird"	Mike Viola	Infant Sorrow	3:24
13.	"Searching for a Father"	Jason Segel; Lyle Workman	Infant Sorrow	3:43
14.	"Supertight"	Jason Segel; Lyle Workman; Russell Brand	Jackie Q featuring Aldous Snow	2:37
15.	"Ring Round"	Greg Kurstin; Inara George	Jackie Q	2:25
Total length:				46:10

Get Him to the Greek – deluxe edition bonus tracks
No.	Title	Lyrics	Artist	Length
16.	"Jackie Q"	Carl Barat	Infant Sorrow	3:41
17.	"Pound Me in the Buttox"	Paul Clarke; Matthew Dick	Jackie Q featuring Aldous Snow	3:31
18.	"Chocolate Daddy"	Lyle Workman; Rodney Rothman	Chocolate Daddy	2:54
19.	"Fuck Your Shit Up"	Lyle Workman	Jumbo Shrimp	2:28
Total length:				58:44

== Charts ==
Chart performance for Get Him to the Greek
Chart (2010)	Peak position
Greek Albums (IFPI Greece)	15
UK Soundtrack Albums (OCC)	12
US Billboard 200	76
US Top Rock Albums (Billboard)	21
US Top Soundtracks (Billboard)	8
