= Let's Get Christmas =

EP by Mike Viola & the Candy Butchers
- Released: 1999
- Genre: Pop rock
- Length: 17:24
- Label: Sony/RPM Records

Mike Viola & the Candy Butchers chronology
Falling into Place (1999)	Let's Get Christmas (1999)	Play with Your Head (2002)

Mike Viola chronology
Falling into Place (1999)	Let's Get Christmas (1999)	Temple of Static (2001)

Let's Get Christmas is an EP by Mike Viola & the Candy Butchers. It was released in 1999 on Sony Records as a throw-away bonus to the Candy Butchers then recently released album Falling into Place. It includes two covers: an acoustic version of the Backstreet Boys' "I Want It That Way" (recorded live at The Kitchen on November 1, 1999), and a rocked up version of Mariah Carey's "All I Want for Christmas Is You."

== Track listing ==
1. "Give Me a Second Chance for Christmas" – 3:17
2. "I Want It That Way" (Live) – 3:52
3. "All I Want for Christmas Is You" – 3:49
4. "Christmas in Venice" – 1:57
5. "Doin' It the Reggae Way" (Bonus track) – 4:27
