= Someone like You (Adele song) =

2011 single by Adele

Single by Adele

from the album 21
- Released: 24 January 2011
- Recorded: 2010
- Studio: Harmony Studios (West Hollywood, CA)
- Genre: Soul; pop
- Length: 4:45
- Label: XL; Columbia
- Songwriters: Adele Adkins; Dan Wilson
- Producers: Adele Adkins; Dan Wilson

Adele singles chronology
"Rolling in the Deep" (2010)	"Someone like You" (2011)	"Set Fire to the Rain" (2011)

Music video
- "Someone like You" on YouTube

"Someone like You" is a song recorded by English singer-songwriter Adele. She and Dan Wilson wrote and produced the track for her second studio album, 21 (2011). XL Recordings released the song as the second single from the album on 24 January 2011 (the same day the album was released) in the United Kingdom and on 9 August 2011 in the United States. Accompanied only by a piano in the song (played by co-writer Wilson), Adele sings about the end of the relationship with her ex-partner who has moved on with someone else.

"Someone like You" received universal critical acclaim, with reviewers choosing it as a highlight of 21 and praised the lyrics, its simple sound and Adele's vocal performance. It became a global success, topping the charts in nineteen countries and reaching the top 10 in various other regions. Following a universally acclaimed performance of the song at the 31st Brit Awards, it became Adele's first number-one single in the UK and stayed atop the chart for five weeks, and was the best-selling single of the year in the region, as well as in Ireland and Italy. It also became Adele's second number one in the US, making her the first British female solo artist in history to have two Billboard Hot 100 number ones from the same album. In July 2011, it became the first single of the decade to be certified 6× Platinum in both the UK and US. It is also certified Diamond in Canada. As of October 2025, the song has 2.4 billion streams on Spotify, making it her most-streamed song on the platform.

The song's music video was directed by Jake Nava and filmed in Paris, France, showing Adele walking alone through the streets. Critics praised the video for being simple and perfect for the sound of the song. As of September 2025, the video has 2.3 billion views on YouTube. She added "Someone Like You" to the set list of her second tour Adele Live. The song has been covered by various artists, including the cast of the series Glee. The official music video was uploaded to YouTube on 30 September 2011.

In 2012, "Someone like You" was voted the third-favourite number-one single of the last 60 years in the UK. "Someone like You" appeared on many year-end lists about the best songs of 2011, and was the inaugural recipient of the Grammy Award for Best Pop Solo Performance, at the 54th ceremony in 2012. The song also received a nomination for the Brit Award for British Single at the 32nd ceremony and also several other nominations. As of 2015, "Someone like You" is the fourth best-selling single of the 21st century and is the 36th-best-selling single in the history of the UK Singles Chart. "Someone Like You" has also been crowned as the UK's most popular karaoke selection for 2011 and 2012.

== Writing and inspiration ==
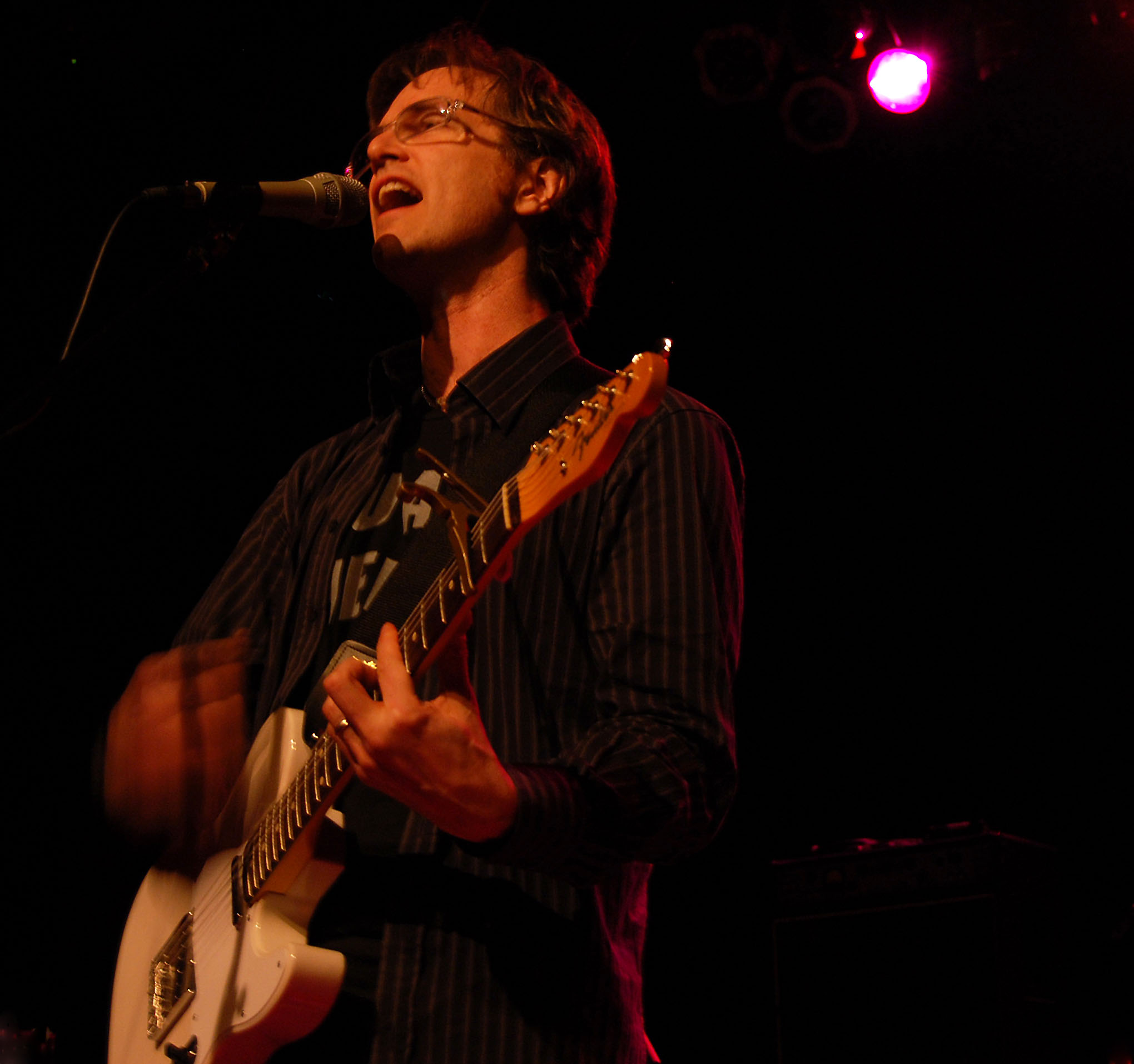
Dan Wilson (pictured), an American songwriter and producer co-wrote the song with Adele.

"Someone like You" is about a boyfriend who broke up with Adele. She wrote it with American songwriter and producer Dan Wilson. It was one of the last songs written for 21. The track, which epitomizes the lyrical content of 21, summarizes the now defunct relationship that the record is all about. Adele has openly discussed the genesis of it saying, "Well, I wrote that song because I was exhausted from being such a bitch, with 'Rolling in the Deep' or 'Rumour Has It' ... I was really emotionally drained from the way I was portraying him, because even though I'm very bitter and regret some parts of it, he's still the most important person that's ever been in my life, and 'Someone like You,' I had to write it to feel OK with myself and OK with the two years I spent with him. And when I did it, I felt so freed."

Adele revealed that she was struggling emotionally when she composed it: "When I was writing it I was feeling pretty miserable and pretty lonely, which I guess kind of contradicts 'Rolling in the Deep'. Whereas that was about me saying, 'I'm going to be fine without you', this is me on my knees really." She discussed further the inspiration of the song: "I can imagine being about 40 and looking for him again, only to turn up and find that he's settled with a beautiful wife and beautiful kids and he's completely happy... and I'm still on my own. The song's about that and I'm scared at the thought of that."

Adele had said that she began writing it on her acoustic guitar in the wake of the break-up of her 18-month relationship with the 30-year-old man she thought she would marry. A few months after their split, he was engaged to someone else. "We were so intense I thought we would get married. But that was something he never wanted... So when I found out he does want that with someone else, it was just the horrible-est feeling ever. But after I wrote it, I felt more at peace. It set me free... I didn't think it would resonate... with the world! I'm never gonna write a song like that again. I think that's the song I'll be known for." She also said that "I wrote that song on the end of my bed. I had a cold. I was waiting for my bath to run. I'd found out that he'd got engaged to someone else."

== Recording and composition ==
"Someone like You"
A 27-second sample of "Someone like You" which features spare and understated production. In the song, Adele wishes her former lover happiness on his new relationship and begs him to never forget her.

Adele took these rudimentary lyrical and musical ideas to the recording session with Wilson, where the two sat around the piano to try out various melodies and lyrics. They decided to keep the musical production sparse: "We just wrote it on the piano and then we recorded it when it was written. It wasn't sort of like recording it and listening to it thinking 'where can we go next?' It was really old school." During an interview with Billboard, Wilson stated that while writing the song, they wanted to make it as personal as possible. He added "We didn't try to make it open-ended so it could apply to 'anybody.' We tried to make it as personal as possible. She may not have had a melodic hook or a specific lyrical idea, but she always knew what she wanted to say. She definitely had a master plan." The song was recorded at Harmony Studios in West Hollywood, California with Wilson playing piano and Philip Allen as engineer. The mixing was done by Tom Elmhirst and Dan Parry while the mastering was finished by Tom Coyne.

"[...] 'Someone like You,' the stirring, somber closer in which Adele goes to visit a former love (with high hopes of a reconciliation), only to discover he has not only moved on with his life, but is in a much better place. And though she's heartbroken, she puts on a brave face, stubbornly proclaiming she'll find someone just like him, even if she knows that she never will. And that conclusion makes you ache not only because it's so daunting, but because it's so real. We've all felt that way, tried to trick ourselves into thinking that any other outcome was possible. In Adele's music, much like life, there are no happy endings."

— James Montgomery of MTV News talking about "Someone like You".

According to sheet music published at Musicnotes.com by Sony Music Publishing, "Someone like You" is a slow tempo of 67.5 beats per minute. Written in common time, the song is in the key of A major. The song follows three chord progressions. Adele's vocal range spans from F♯_{3} to E_{5} during the song. A slow, plaintive ballad pairing Adele's voice with a looping piano line, "Someone like You" is the lyrical opposite of "Rolling in the Deep" on which the singer narrates coming to terms with the end of the relationship: "Nevermind, I'll find someone like you/I wish nothing but the best for you, too/Don't forget me, I beg/I'll remember you said/Sometimes it lasts in love, but sometimes it hurts instead." According to Sean Fennessey of The Village Voice, the singer's "nuanced" voice goes up a full octave and "into a near-shrieked whisper" as she sings parts of the chorus. However, she "rebounds and gathers herself", and her voice descends into its fuller and more melancholy state. Critics praised its introspective lyrics and maturity. "Someone like You" has been compared to the song "Hometown Glory" (2008) from the album 19. John Murphy of MusicOMH said that the song "casts Adele as the spurned lover, turning up outside her ex's house, now moved on and settled down, begging for a second chance." According to Aamir Yaqub of Soul Culture, "Talking of a lost love, this an extremely touching track with a vocal performance that makes the narrative almost tangible ... It really captures the experience of the story and puts it across in both a credible and incredible fashion." Cameron Adams of Herald Sun called the song a "spine-tingling sparse piano ballad."

Lyrically, the song talks about the end of Adele's first "real relationship", which was with her long-time friend and lover, and it shows her confronting his marriage. At the beginning of the song, she sings the lines "I heard that you're settled down/That you found a girl and you're married now. I heard that your dreams came true/Guess she gave you things I couldn't give to you" with a soft voice and accompanied just by a simple piano melody. The lyrics of "Someone like You" are talking about what once was and what could have been as stated by a writer of Daily Herald. Finding the strength to bounce back from hardship and heartache, Adele sings the lines, "Never mind, I'll find someone like you. I wish nothing but the best for you, too/Don't forget me, I beg, I remember you said/Sometimes it lasts in love but sometimes it hurts instead." Talking about the meaning and the composition of the song, Jer Fairall of PopMatters said: "The song's subject—Adele mentally addressing an old lover who has since found happiness elsewhere—is familiar, but the detail she colors it with are vibrantly tactile and resonant, from the sense-memory setting of 'we were born and raised in a summer haze' to her recollection of his cruel kiss-off line 'I remember you said, 'sometimes it lasts in love and sometimes it hurts instead' and how she comes to take solace in the statement as an empowering mantra." During her concert tour in August 2024, Adele revealed that this song had changed her life.

== Critical reception ==
Upon release, the song received widespread acclaim from music critics, with many citing it as the highlight of 21. In a track-by-track review for 21, Joanne Dorken of MTV UK noted the track's placement at the end of the album saying, "It maybe a cliché, but Adele has saved the best until last with this heartfelt and enchanting piano ballad. ... It's sad but beautiful and displays Adele at her best – marking the perfect end to what has been in our eyes, a faultless album." Will Dean of The Guardian claimed the song was the album's "highlight", characterizing it as "gorgeous". That was echoed by Slant Magazine's Matthew Cole who also called the song "gorgeous". NME's Chris Parkin also marked the song as a highlight, describing it as "surprisingly weighty" and comparing it favorably to the work of American Country blues singer Karen Dalton.

Tom Breihan of Pitchfork Media selected "Someone like You" as a song of the day, claiming it served as a reaffirmation of popular music: "Sometimes, pop music can still break your heart." Writing for BBC Online, Ian Wade noted that the "final track Someone Like You, just voice and piano, is an actual thing of beauty, placing the listener in one of those moments where you feel you're in the presence of a future standard." Bill Lamb of About.com wrote that "the piano melody is gorgeous and combined with Adele's heartfelt reading of her words, the effect is highly emotional. You can imagine it being both honked through by talent show contestants and transcended by veterans alike." Lamb went to write that the song is one of the "top songs of 2011" and that "romantic pain has rarely been so utterly beautiful." Jer Fairall of PopMatters called the song "absolute magic" and praised Adele's performance by saying, "Though it is unquestionably her finest vocal showcase to date, it is less remarkable for its more powerful moments than for the small ones where her voice dips, with rueful melancholy on the line 'I heard that your dreams came true' or cracks on the 'I beg' in the chorus, like she's startled at the revelation of her own vulnerability." He further called her vocal performance of the song "stunning" and "finally worthy of her talents".

Writing for the website No Ripcord, Gary McGinley said that the song "has an aching beauty and the hallmarks of a modern standard." He further added that it "sounds poised to soundtrack atmospheric TV trailers over the coming months." A writer of URB magazine called "Someone like You" "a heart-wrencher made all the more real by reeling phrasing and bare-voiced pleading, 'I wish nothing but the best for you, too.'" John Murphy of MusicOMH categorized "Someone like You" and "Turning Tables" as "the two best songs on the album." He concluded that the song was "desperately sad and utterly, utterly gorgeous." Bary Walters of Spin wrote that on "the piano-led finale, she vows, 'I'll find someone like you,' as if that's progress. It's a statement that's utterly WTF and yet true to the cyclical nature of psychological damage." Sputnikmusic's Joseph Viney called the song "an ode to stalking with a perverse attitude that lies underneath the fragile composition, looks set to become the soundtrack to a million messy break-ups." Allison Stewart of The Washington Post put the song on her list "Recommended tracks".

The Village Voice's Pazz & Jop annual critics' poll of the best songs of 2011 ranked "Someone like You" at number nine; Adele's previous single "Rolling in the Deep" topped the same critics' poll. In 2019, Stereogum, Rolling Stone, and Pitchfork ranked the song as the 39th, 64th, and 71st best song of the 2010s, respectively. Parade and American Songwriter both ranked the song number six on their lists of Adele's greatest songs.

== Commercial performance ==
"Someone like You" achieved international commercial success, topping the record charts in Australia, Ireland, New Zealand, the United Kingdom and the United States, as well as reaching the top ten in many other countries. The song debuted at number 36 on the UK Singles Chart in late-January 2011 due to strong digital downloads from 21. Following a live performance of the song at the 2011 BRIT Awards, it climbed 46 places from the previous week to number one, beating Lady Gaga's single "Born This Way" (2011), although it was at number 18 on the mid-week chart update. While "Someone like You" was at number one on the chart, Adele's previous single, "Rolling in the Deep" was placed at number four. With that achievement, Adele has become the first living artist since The Beatles in 1964 who simultaneously had two top five hits in both the charts (21 and 19 were also in the top five on the UK Albums Chart). It stayed atop the chart for four consecutive weeks before slipping to number two on 26 March. Following a performance on Comic Relief, the song returned to number one for a fifth week. It has been certified 6× Platinum by the BPI, denoting sales and streams of 3,600,000 units. On 5 July 2011, it was announced that the song had sold 1 million copies in the UK, becoming the first single of the decade to reach the threshold and the sixteenth song released in the 21st century to do so. It became the biggest selling single of 2011 in the United Kingdom, selling over 1,240,000 copies. By June 2015, UK sales stood at 1,570,000 copies, making "Someone like You" the second best-selling single of the 2010s and the third-best-seller of the 21st century. As of November 2015, the song has sold 1,584,000 copies in the UK.

In Finland, "Someone like You" debuted at number 14 in October 2011 and rose to number one in its 12th week in early 2012—the week when Adele had three simultaneous top-ten songs ("Rolling in the Deep" at number two and "Set Fire to the Rain" at number seven). In France, despite not having been certified, "Someone like You" has sold 350,800 copies and became one of the best-selling singles in the country. The song debuted at number 47 on the Australian Singles Chart. "Someone like You" remained at the top position of the chart for seven consecutive weeks and it was certified 4× Platinum by the Australian Recording Industry Association (ARIA). It has also peaked at number one in New Zealand for five weeks, ending an 11-week run at number one for "Party Rock Anthem".

The single sold 51,000 copies its first week in the US, debuting at number 65. The single re-entered the Billboard Hot 100 at number 97 on the week ending 30 July 2011. Upon its radio release in the United States, and a surge in popularity following her performance at the 2011 MTV Video Music Awards, "Someone like You" climbed 18 positions to number one from number 19, and became her second consecutive number-one single on the Hot 100 and making Adele the first ever British female singer to spawn two consecutive number-one singles from the same album. After the performance, "Someone like You" moved from number 11 to number one on the Digital Songs chart with 275,000 downloads sold (191% increase), according to Nielsen SoundScan. On Radio Songs, the track moved from number 42 to number 19 with 46 million all-format audience impressions (59% increase), according to Nielsen BDS. The song made Hot 100 history by achieving the biggest jump to number 1 in the chart's 53-year history that was not spurred by the release of a single. "Someone like You" became the first strictly voice-and-piano ballad to top the Billboard Hot 100. The song also became the first "unquestionably slow song" to top the Hot 100 chart since Rihanna's song, "Take a Bow" (2008). It topped the chart for 1 week and then slipped from number 1 to number 2 being replaced by Maroon 5 and Christina Aguilera's "Moves Like Jagger". A few days after the release of its video, on 6 October 2011, the song returned to number one and spent 4 more weeks at the top, where it was later replaced by "We Found Love" by Rihanna featuring Calvin Harris. With "Rolling in the Deep" spending 7 weeks at number one on the Hot 100 and "Someone like You" spending 5 weeks, Adele is the first female solo artist to log 12 weeks at No. 1 in a calendar year with two strictly solo recordings. Beyoncé, Monica and Mariah Carey also did it (in 2003, 1998 and 1995, respectively), if collaborations are included. As of April 2015, it has sold 6 million downloads in the United States alone.

== Music video ==
Adele walking alone in Paris in the black-and-white music video for "Someone like You"

The music video for the song was filmed in Paris by English director Jake Nava who said:

The location evokes style and romance. And shooting early in the morning allows you to focus on Adele in this lonely and emotional space.

The video begins with a shot of a road in Paris and Adele is seen walking on it alone. She continues to walk and starts singing the song with a sad look as the camera makes circles and shots more locations in Paris including the Eiffel Tower. During the second chorus, Adele stops singing and pauses on the Pont Alexandre III to look over the Seine. She continues walking through the deserted streets during the bridge before finally entering a building in which she sees her ex-lover. After seeing her, he starts to walk away and several shots of Adele looking at him follow.

The video premiered on MTV and Vevo on 29 September 2011, It received glowing reviews from music critics; James Montgomery of MTV News called the video "a somber, black-and-white affair, featuring Adele wandering the early morning streets and pining for her long-lost love. It's a perfect match for the song's jaw-dropping emotional range—raw and unfiltered and incredibly sad but also, in a lot of ways, beautiful and resolute." In another review of the video he praised its black-and-white shots saying that "director Jake Nava made the smart decision to shoot it in arty, smudgy black-and-white, which only adds to the clip's desolate, haunted feel." He added that "there are no special effects, no camera tricks or elaborate choreography, because those are quick fixes" and called Adele the "Queen of Pain." A writer of the website HitFix concluded that the video is "in keeping with the singer's subdued style" and added that its vibe fits with the "melancholy tune." Entertainment Weekly's Tanner Stransky called the video "quiet" and said that "it's just what you'd want to see for this break-up heart-wrencher." Krista Wick of Entertainment Tonight praised the video for being "more than enough to accompany Adele's soulful vocals."

Amanda Dobbins of New York magazine concluded that "the secretly devastating video" for "Someone like You" will remind Adele's ex-lover what he has done by leaving her. A writer of The Huffington Post praised the simplicity and the sadness in the video. Sarah Dean of the same publication called it an "uncomplicated, moving film" and wrote, "the video is nothing more than Adele wandering around the deserted city of love alone, under its grey skies, singing her sorrowful notes, but because it's her, we don't need any more." That was echoed by Jason Lipshutz of Billboard magazine who said that the video was "as simply constructed as the song's vocal-and-piano arrangement." Marc Hogan of Spin said that the scene in which Adele looks in the camera, "speak[s] for itself" about the sadness in the video. Andrew Matson of The Seattle Times said, "the song of the year now has a simple, perfect video: Adele in Paris, singing and strolling, apparently processing the breakup detailed in the song's lyrics. The look on her face during the 'I wish nothing but the best for you' line is the best, just gutting, a real achievement how she plays it cold but not sarcastic. I think in times of emotional devastation, everyone wants stand on a bridge over the Seine on a cold day, squinting into the wind, sorting it out."

A writer of Rolling Stone wrote: "this clip for the ballad 'Someone Like You' sticks to the singer's simple but emotionally direct approach with black-and-white footage that lingers on her subtly expressive face as she lip-synchs to the tune while walking along sad, grey city streets." Andrea Devaro of Long Island Press concluded, "its simplicity beautifully portrays the complexity of emotions invoked in the song." Leah Collins of Dose called Adele "'60s bombshell glam" and said that the video's "simplicity is its strength." She added: "There's something about streetlamps, cafes and the River Seine that lend an air of melancholic elegance to what would otherwise be just another walk of shame by a girl with two-day-old hair. Not everyone gets to indulge in moments as tragic but beautiful as a weepy solitary walk through Paris landmarks. But then, we don't all have voices as tragic and beautiful as Adele's either." A more mixed review was given by AOL's Ashley Percival who called the video predictable and added "It's all very pleasant, but after all this time, what's the point?". Nicole Eggenberger of OK! wrote that Adele "created the perfect music video to go along with her hauntingly beautiful ballad" and further described it as "simple yet stunning."

== Accolades ==
At the 2011 Q Awards, "Someone like You" was nominated in the category for Best Track. The song was also nominated in the category for Best Song at the 2011 Music of Black Origin Awards. "Someone like You" won the first Grammy Award for Best Pop Solo Performance, at the 54th Grammy Awards, which were held on 12 February 2012. Song also nominated for Brit Award for British Single at the 32nd Brit Awards, but lost to "What Makes You Beautiful" by One Direction.

Year	Organization	Award	Result	Ref.
2011	BT Digital Music Awards	Best Song	Nominated	
2011	GAFFA Awards (Denmark)	Best Foreign Song	Won	
2011	MOBO Awards	Best Song	Nominated	
2011	Q Awards	Best Track	Nominated	
2012	Billboard Music Awards	Top Streaming Song (Video)	Nominated	
2012	Billboard Music Awards	Top Rock Song	Nominated	
2012	BMI Awards	Award Winning Song	Won	
2012	Brit Awards	British Single	Nominated	
2012	Gaygalan Awards	International Song of the Year	Nominated	
2012	Grammy Awards	Best Pop Solo Performance	Won	
2012	Ivor Novello Awards	PRS for Music Most Performed Work	Nominated	
2012	Los Premios 40 Principales	Best International Song	Won	
2012	MTV Video Music Awards	Best Cinematography	Nominated	
2012	NAACP Image Awards	Outstanding Song	Nominated	
2012	NAACP Image Awards	Outstanding Music Video	Nominated	
2012	NRJ Music Awards	Best International Song	Won	

== Live performances ==
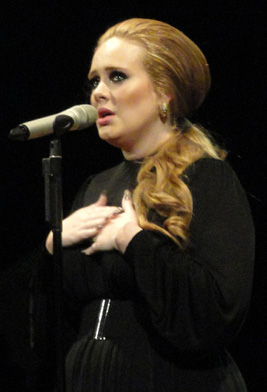
Adele performing "Someone like You" in 2011 during a concert in Seattle, Washington

Adele performed "Someone like You" for the first time in October 2010 at The Current studios in Saint Paul, Minnesota. During a November 2010 performance on the BBC music show Later... with Jools Holland, there was a notable stunned silence from the audience as the performance finished, before bursting into applause. Adele has since described this performance as a career defining moment. Later, she performed the song at the 2011 BRIT Awards held at The O2 Arena in London on 15 February 2011. She appeared on stage backed just by her pianist while "special effects were limited to a shower of glitter and Adele's own tears, as she almost broke down delivering her lovelorn plea to an ex-boyfriend" as stated by Neil McCormick of The Daily Telegraph. Speaking on the ITV2 after show, Adele explained why she had cried at the end of the performance saying, "I was really emotional by the end because I'm quite overwhelmed by everything anyway, and then I had a vision of my ex, of him watching me at home and he's going to be laughing at me because he knows I'm crying because of him, with him thinking, 'Yep, she's still wrapped around my finger'. Then everyone stood up, so I was overwhelmed." A writer of Daily Mirror said that "Adele stole the show [...] with her universally-praised performance of Someone Like You." Neil McCormick of The Daily Telegraph chose the song as a highlight on the show saying that Adele knocked "everyone for six with no bells and whistles, just a piano, her gorgeous voice and a monster song, Someone Like You." Later, the song was performed during a VH1 special called "Unplugged". Adele also performed the song at Jimmy Kimmel Live! on 24 February 2011. The same day she performed "Someone like You" on The Ellen DeGeneres Show.

The singer also performed the song at the 2011 MTV Video Music Awards held at the Nokia Theatre in Los Angeles on 28 August 2011. After being introduced by American singer Katy Perry, Adele appeared in a black scalloped lace dress by Barbara Tfank, and standing alone on the stage, only with her pianist behind her. Her hair was pulled back and a signature ponytail draped over one shoulder she sang the song and "did vocal aerobics and dripped her soulful, sultry sound over the dark ballad, while a transfixed audience watched her" as stated by Kelley L. Carter of MTV. After the performance she received a standing ovation from fans and critics. According to USA Today's Cindy Clark she "captivated the audience with her powerful performance". Wesley Case of The Baltimore Sun concluded, "Adele's 'Someone Like You' could make a tough guy weep. Her tone was gorgeous." Rating the performance with A, Claire Suddath of Time magazine said "it's heartening to hear a truly talented woman sing a mournful torch song for someone who has left her for someone better. And if her stellar performance, accompanied by only a piano, isn't enough to melt your heart, then her nervous wave to the audience at the end definitely will." A writer of Los Angeles Times called her vocals "strong and direct, and tackles grief by moving with the melody rather than trying to pummel it" and added that it was "less-is-more performance, a tactic award-show producers rarely indulge in, but Adele needs few adornments to impress." A writer of Rolling Stone said that Adele brought a "big dollop of elegance to the VMAs with a spare, moving rendition of 'Someone Like You'" and added that "amid all the pop art glitz, it was a refreshing palate cleanser."

Gina Sepre of E! Online praised the performance saying, "When Adele took the stage to perform her understatedly stripped-down and hugely impactful performance of 'Someone Like You,' there were no pyrotechnics, no acrobatics, no lavender hair, and no autotune. And guess what? We didn't miss it. There may be hope yet for MTV to remember just what the 'M' in their name actually stands for." Writing about the performance, Chris Coplan of Consequence of Sound concluded that "Someone like You", "highlighted the power a bare-bones, booming performance can have in netting people's attention. Simple is not a bad word, pop music." Giving the performance an A+, Lindsey Ward of Jam! said: "When I learned British chart-topper Adele would be performing at Sunday's awards I thought, 'Whew – at least we're guaranteed five solid, meaningful minutes of quality music television'. I was right; her frill-free performance of breakup ballad Someone Like You was just that." Kyle Anderson of Entertainment Weekly highlighted the performance calling it "one of the best performances of the show." Another writer of the same publication gave the performance a grade of A+ and wrote: "It takes a real super power to make the seizure-inducing lasers stop, and that power's name is Adele. The broadcast temporarily abandoned its frantic mission of nonstop overstimulation, bowing to the 23-year-old English soulstress's soaring, nearly a cappella (well done, subtle piano man) rendition of her heart-wrecking ballad "Someone Like You." In a modest black dress and with a few spare hand movements, she delivered all the shock and awe of a million-watt showstopper. Who needs special effects, when God gave you your own? Even Britney Spears looked like she had to fix her mascara when it was all over."

"Someone like You" was also added to the set list of the second concert tour by Adele, Adele Live, and it was performed during the encore. While reviewing a concert by Adele, Joanne Dorken of MTV UK, said "There wasn't a dry eye in the house as Adele powered her way through the ballad, encouraging the audience to help her sing the somewhat beautiful, yet emotional chorus – giving everyone goosebumps. The sounds of Someone Like You bounced off every wall and tugged at every heart-string, making it a truly special moment and something that every member of the Apollo crowd will never forget." Jim Harrington of San Jose Mercury News chose the song as a highlight on the show adding that the song showed "her supreme vocal talent."

== Cover versions ==
Charlie Puth first gained notice for his cover of "Someone like You", sung as a duet with fellow Berklee student Emily Luther, and uploaded to YouTube in September 2011. Ellen DeGeneres saw this video and invited Puth to appear twice on The Ellen DeGeneres Show, and she signed Puth to eleveneleven, her record label. This was the start of Puth's fame.

Amber Riley, Naya Rivera and Heather Morris sang a mash-up of "Someone like You" and Adele's other song "Rumour Has It" (2011) during Glee's episode "Mash Off" which aired on 15 November. However, the cover was posted online on 10 November. Jenna Mullins of E! Online praised the cover, saying that it will "knock your socks right off" and a writer for OK! described it as "AMAZE-ing". Erica Futterman of Rolling Stone noted that the cover was "one of the greatest things the show has done [so far]." Similarly, Billboard's Raye Votta commented that the cover was "arguably the best performance 'Glee' has done since 'Don't Stop Believin''." Their version of the song peaked at number 11 on the Billboard Hot 100 while selling 160,000 digital downloads in its first week and became the fifth highest digital sales week by a Glee Cast single. As of March 2015, it remains the ninth best-selling Glee Cast recording in the show's history, having sold 413,000 copies in the United States. In Canada, the song made a "Hot Shot Debut" on the Canadian Hot 100 at number 12, selling 14,000 downloads. The song peaked at No. 35 on the UK Singles Chart, the first Glee recording to make the UK top 40 since "I Feel Pretty / Unpretty".

Country musician David Nail recorded a cover of "Someone like You", which was posted on his YouTube account on 15 May 2012. The song is featured on Nail's three-track digital EP, 1979 which was released on 17 July 2012. Nail's version debuted at number 57 on the Billboard Hot Country Songs chart in September 2012, reaching as high as number 52. Metalcore band Ice Nine Kills released a cover version in 2012. Andy Black and Juliet Simms released a cover version in 2017 for the Album Punk Goes Pop Vol.7 Dan Wilson recorded "Someone Like You" with the Kronos Quartet on his 2017 Re-Covered album of songs he wrote for or with other performers.

== Credits and personnel ==
Credits are taken from 21 liner notes.

- Adele Adkins – lead vocals, backing vocals, songwriter, producer
- Dan Wilson – songwriter, producer, piano
- Philip Allen – engineer
- Tom Coyne – mastering
- Tom Elmhirst – mixer
- Dan Parry – assistant mixer

== Track listings ==
Digital download
No.	Title	Writer(s)	Producer(s)	Length
1.	"Someone like You"	Adele Adkins; Dan Wilson	Dan Wilson; Adele Adkins	4:47

2011 BRIT Awards performance
No.	Title	Writer(s)	Producer(s)	Length
1.	"Someone like You: Live from the BRITs"	Adele Adkins; Dan Wilson	iTunes	5:10

Amazon Music free download
No.	Title	Writer(s)	Producer(s)	Length
1.	"Someone like You (Performed Live in Her Home)"	Adele Adkins; Dan Wilson	Amazon Music	5:22

Australian single
No.	Title	Writer(s)	Producer(s)	Length
1.	"Someone like You"	Adkins; Wilson	Adkins; Wilson	4:47
2.	"Someone like You: Live from the BRITs"	Adkins; Wilson	Adkins; Wilson	5:10

== Charts ==
=== Weekly charts ===
Weekly chart performance
Chart (2011–2012)	Peak position
Australia (ARIA)	1
Austria (Ö3 Austria Top 40)	2
Belgium (Ultratop 50 Flanders)	2
Belgium (Ultratop 50 Wallonia)	1
Brazil (Crowley Broadcast Analysis)	1
Canada Hot 100 (Billboard)	2
Croatia International Airplay (HRT)	2
Czech Republic Airplay (ČNS IFPI)	1
Denmark (Tracklisten)	2
Europe (Euro Digital Songs)	1
Finland (Suomen virallinen lista)	1
France (SNEP)	1
Germany (GfK)	4
Greece Digital Songs (Billboard)	8
Hungary (Rádiós Top 40)	5
Hungary (Single Top 40)	23
Iceland (RÚV)	1
Ireland (IRMA)	1
Israel International Airplay (Media Forest)	2
Italy (FIMI)	1
Japan (Japan Hot 100)	43
Luxembourg Digital Songs (Billboard)	4
Mexico (Billboard Mexican Airplay)	7
Mexico Anglo (Monitor Latino)	5
Netherlands (Dutch Top 40)	3
Netherlands (Single Top 100)	2
New Zealand (Recorded Music NZ)	1
Norway (VG-lista)	5
Poland Airplay (ZPAV)	1
Poland Digital Songs (Billboard)	1
Portugal Digital Songs (Billboard)	1
Romania (Romanian Top 100)	2
Scottish Singles Sales (Official Charts)	1
Slovakia Airplay (ČNS IFPI)	4
South Korea International Singles (Gaon)	9
Spain (Promusicae)	4
Spain (Airplay Chart)	1
Sweden (Sverigetopplistan)	3
Switzerland (Schweizer Hitparade)	1
UK Singles (Official Charts)	1
UK Indie (Official Charts)	1
Ukraine (Radio Hits Top 100)	85
US Billboard Hot 100	1
US Adult Contemporary (Billboard)	1
US Adult Pop Airplay (Billboard)	1
US Hot Dance Club Songs (Billboard)	24
US Hot Rock & Alternative Songs (Billboard)	24
US Latin Pop Songs (Billboard)	6
US Pop Airplay (Billboard)	2

2013 chart performance for "Someone like You"
Chart (2013)	Peak position
Slovenia (SloTop50)	31

2015 chart performance for "Someone like You"
Chart (2015)	Peak position
Czech Republic Singles Digital (ČNS IFPI)	52
Slovakia Singles Digital (ČNS IFPI)	76

2018 chart performance for "Someone like You"
Chart (2018)	Peak position
South Korea Digital Chart(Gaon)	96

2021 chart performance for "Someone like You"
Chart (2021)	Peak position
South Africa (RISA)	55
Global 200 (Billboard)	33

=== Year-end charts ===
2011 year-end chart performance for "Someone like You"
Chart (2011)	Position
Australian Singles Chart	4
Austrian Singles Chart	31
Belgian Singles Chart (Flanders)	5
Belgian Singles Chart (Wallonia)	10
Brazil (Crowley)	25
Canadian Hot 100	16
Croatia International Airplay (HRT)	8
Danish Singles Chart	17
German Singles Chart	28
Hungarian Airplay Chart	44
Icelandic Singles Chart	7
Irish Singles Chart	1
Israeli Airplay Chart	7
Italian Singles Chart	1
Netherlands (Dutch Top 40)	2
Netherlands (Mega Single Top 100)	10
New Zealand Singles Chart	4
Romania (Romanian Top 100)	69
Spanish Singles Chart	39
Swedish Singles Chart	4
Swiss Singles Chart	9
UK Singles Chart	1
US Billboard Hot 100	24
US Adult Contemporary (Billboard)	26
US Adult Pop Songs (Billboard)	17
US Mainstream Top 40 (Billboard)	29

2012 year-end chart performance for "Someone like You"
Chart (2012)	Position
Argentine Digital Singles Chart	6
Austrian Singles Chart	61
Belgian Singles Chart (Flanders)	30
Belgian Singles Chart (Wallonia)	15
Brazil (Crowley)	5
Canadian Hot 100	42
Germany (Media Control AG)	54
Italian Singles Chart	11
Netherlands (Mega Single Top 100)	90
Hungarian Airplay Chart	83
Spanish Singles Chart	12
Swedish Singles Chart	42
Swiss Singles Chart	12
US Billboard Hot 100	43
US Adult Contemporary (Billboard)	8
US Adult Top 40 (Billboard)	44

2021 year-end chart performance for "Someone like You"
Chart (2021)	Position
UK Singles (OCC)	81

2022 year-end chart performance for "Someone like You"
Chart (2022)	Position
Global Excl. US (Billboard)	197

2023 year-end chart performance for "Someone like You"
Chart (2023)	Position
UK Singles (OCC)	87

=== Decade-end charts ===
2010s-end chart performance for "Someone like You"
Chart (2010–2019)	Position
Australia (ARIA)	10
UK Singles (Official Charts Company)	16
US Billboard Hot 100	38

=== All-time chart ===
Chart (All-time)	Position
US Billboard Hot 100 (Women)	44
US Billboard Hot 100	144
UK Singles (Official Charts Company)	25

== Certifications and sales ==
Certifications and sales
Region	Certification	Certified units/sales
Australia (ARIA)	7× Platinum	490,000^{^}
Belgium (BRMA)	2× Platinum	60,000^{*}
Brazil (Pro-Música Brasil)	Diamond	250,000^{‡}
Canada (Music Canada)	Diamond	800,000^{‡}
Denmark (IFPI Danmark)	4× Platinum	360,000^{‡}
France	—	358,000
Germany (BVMI)	Platinum	300,000^{^}
Italy (FIMI)	7× Platinum	210,000^{*}
Mexico (AMPROFON)	2× Platinum+Gold	150,000^{*}
New Zealand (RMNZ)	8× Platinum	240,000^{‡}
Norway (IFPI Norway)	Platinum	60,000^{‡}
Portugal (AFP)	Platinum	20,000^{‡}
South Korea (Circle Chart)	—	2,792,140
Spain (Promusicae)	4× Platinum	240,000^{‡}
United Kingdom (BPI)	8× Platinum	4,800,000^{‡}
United States (RIAA)	5× Platinum	6,000,000
Streaming
South Korea (Circle Chart)	—	100,000,000
Greece (IFPI Greece)	Gold	1,000,000^{†}
^{*} Sales figures based on certification alone.^{^} Shipments figures based on certification alone.^{‡} Sales+streaming figures based on certification alone.^{†} Streaming-only figures based on certification alone.

== Release history ==
Release dates for "Someone like You"
Region	Date	Format
United Kingdom	24 January 2011	Digital download
Germany	24 January 2011	Digital download
Ireland	24 January 2011	Digital download
Austria	24 January 2011	Digital download
Switzerland	24 January 2011	Digital download
Netherlands	17 March 2011	Digital download – Live from the BRITs
United Kingdom	17 March 2011	Digital download – Live from the BRITs
Australia	13 June 2011	Digital download
New Zealand	13 June 2011	Digital download
United States	9 August 2011	Mainstream airplay
France	30 September 2011	Digital download
Germany	30 September 2011	Digital download
Luxembourg	30 September 2011	Digital download
Italy	30 September 2011	Digital download
Canada	30 September 2011	Digital download
Australia	30 September 2011	Digital download
Austria	30 September 2011	Digital download

== See also ==
- List of best-selling singles
- List of best-selling singles in the United States
- List of million-selling singles in the United Kingdom
- List of Adult Top 40 number-one singles of 2011
- List of Hot 100 number-one singles of 2011 (U.S.)
- List of Hot 100 number-one singles of 2012 (Brazil)
- List of number-one singles from the 2010s (UK)
- List of number-one singles and albums of 2011 (Ireland)
- List of number-one singles of 2011 (Australia)
- List of number-one singles from the 2010s (New Zealand)
- List of number-one hits of 2011 (Italy)
- List of number-one singles of 2011 (Poland)
- List of number-one hits of 2011 (France)
- List of number-one hits of 2011 (Switzerland)
- List of number-one pop hits of 2011 (Brazil)
- List of Ultratop 40 number-one singles of 2011
- List of Billboard Adult Contemporary number ones of 2011 and 2012 (U.S.)
