= When I Wasn't Watching =

Single by Mandy Moore

from the album Silver Landings
- Released: September 17, 2019
- Genre: Pop
- Length: 3:29
- Label: Verve Forecast
- Songwriters: Jason Boesel; Mandy Moore; Mike Viola; Taylor Goldsmith
- Producer: Mike Viola

Mandy Moore singles chronology
"Wind in My Hair" (2017)	"When I Wasn't Watching" (2019)	"I'd Rather Lose" (2019)

Music video
- "When I Wasn't Watching" on YouTube

"When I Wasn't Watching" is a song by American singer Mandy Moore from her sixth studio album, Silver Landings (2020). It was released on September 17, 2019, by Verve Forecast Records as the first single from the album. The song was written by Jason Boesel, Moore, Mike Viola and Taylor Goldsmith, with production by Viola.

== Background ==
In July 2018, Mandy Moore announced she was back in the studio and working on new music; in a post on social media, she stated: "It's time. I miss it. I'm not scared anymore. No more excuses. No more allowing someone's else insecurities to dictate my relationship to music and singing. Boom. Also– this is just a little demo of something @themikeviola and I worked on yesterday... but still, it's a start." In June 2019, she revealed she was working with her husband, musician Taylor Goldsmith, on new music, and by August, she told Entertainment Tonight that music would be coming "soon", later clarifying the release as "imminently". That same month, she teased the release of new music on her social media, with the caption, "Stay tuned."

Upon the song's release, Moore released a statement, stating: "The idea of diving back into music after so much time and personal change was really intimidating to me for a while. But then I finally realized: I'm the only person who can make this move. It all has to start with me."

== Critical reception ==
In a positive review, Halle Kiefer of Vulture stated: "Lucky, Mandy Moore is here with a new song to act as the perfect autumnal segue. 'When I Wasn't Watching,' Moore's first new original song [...] sounds like orange and brown leaves falling directly into your pumpkin spiced latte." In their review of the song, Rolling Stone credited the song for its "Seventies California pop", while also calling the song "breezy" and "refreshing". Vice described the song as "breathy" and "introspective", while describing the lyrics as a "confessional".

== Commercial performance ==
"When I Wasn't Watching" debuted at number twenty-four on the Billboard Alternative Digital Song Sales, becoming Moore's first song to enter the chart.

== Music video ==
The music video was released on the same day as the song. It was directed by Lauren Dukoff.

== Credits and personnel ==
Credits adapted from Tidal metadata.

- Jason Boesel – background vocalist, composer, guitar, lyricist
- David Boucher – recording engineer, studio personnel
- Eric Boulanger – mastering engineer, Studio personnel
- David Cerminara – mixer, studio personnel
- Davey Faragher – electric bass
- Taylor Goldsmith – composer, lyricist,
- Mandy Moore – composer, lyricist, vocals
- Wesley Seidman – assistant recording engineer, studio personnel
- Mike Viola – background vocalist, composer, guitar, lyricist, mixer, piano, producer, recording engineer, studio personnel

== Charts ==
Chart performance for "When I Wasn't Watching"
Chart (2019)	Peak position
US Alternative Digital Song Sales (Billboard)	24

== Release history ==
Region	Date	Format	Label	Ref.
Various	September 17, 2019	Digital download; streaming	Verve Forecast	

== Other version ==
On July 2, 2021, Cody Carrera released a cover of "When I Wasn't Watching."
