= Amanda Leigh =

Studio album by Mandy Moore
- Released: May 26, 2009
- Recorded: December 2008
- Length: 37:57
- Label: Storefront
- Producer: Mike Viola

Mandy Moore chronology
Wild Hope (2007)	Amanda Leigh (2009)	Silver Landings (2020)

Singles from Amanda Leigh
- 1. "I Could Break Your Heart Any Day of the Week" Released: April 1, 2009

Amanda Leigh is the fifth studio album by American singer-songwriter Mandy Moore, released by Storefront Records on May 26, 2009 with distribution by Red Distribution.

Amanda Leigh debuted at number 25 on the US Billboard 200 with 15,000 copies sold on its first week. The album's lead single "I Could Break Your Heart Any Day of the Week" was released on March 17, 2009.

== Background and music ==
In October 2008, Moore posted live videos of three new songs she had been working on with singer-songwriter, record producer, pianist and guitarist Mike Viola on her blog. Then fans thought it was a possible duo album with Moore and Viola, but in January 2009, it was revealed to be Moore's sixth studio album with a collaboration with Viola.

Recording sessions for the album took place around December 2008 in Boston, Massachusetts.

It was announced in February 2009 that the album was going to be released in May by Storefront Records that was founded by Moore's longtime music manager Jon Leshay. Moore also collaborated with singer-songwriter Lori McKenna again, with whom she co-wrote three songs on her fourth studio album Wild Hope (2007).

The album's music is variously influenced by three of Moore's favorite singers, Paul McCartney, Joni Mitchell and Todd Rundgren. According to Moore, "The music is all a reflection of me now, not somebody else's choices."

== Composition ==
The album's opening song "Merrimack River" is named after the river of the same name and which, according to Moore, she knew was exactly the way to start the album, indicating the lyrics ("restless to begin a wave comes crashing in"). The second song, "Fern Dell", was one of the first few songs recorded for the album. According to Moore, the song talks about first impressions and how they can affect and change your world. The third song, "I Could Break Your Heart Any Day of the Week", also served as the only official single released. About the song, Moore said "it's a way of owning and acknowledging your sense of worth in a rather tongue-in-cheek manner". The fourth song, "Pocket Philosopher", is about "the excitement of meeting someone new and wanting to stop time so you could figured them out a little more". The fifth song, "Song About Home", talks about the struggles that there might be between the definitions of home when you are a child and when you have your own family. The sixth song, "Everblue", is the last of the six or seven songs co-written by Moore and Lori McKenna. The song is heavy, but has a comfortable, resigned sadness. The seventh song, "Merrimack River (Reprise)," is an instrumental version of the first song of the album. The eighth song, "Love to Love Me Back", is a country song which talks about loving and being loved back by someone who is capable of having "two way conversations" and someone who "can handle any situation". The song was also the first song co-written by Moore with Mike Viola and Inara George and it became "instant driving force in shaping what the record turned out to be". The ninth song, "Indian Summer", is what Moore said was "the one song that carried severe demo-itis for me". The tenth song, "Nothing Everything", was the last song written for it. The song is about telling someone that maybe it is time to move on and that you feel that the person deserves the best, and you are not it. According to Moore, Viola was working on the melody for a few days, but the lyrics were written in fifteen minutes. The eleventh and last song's title, "Bug", is named after Moore's nickname from her then-husband, former Whiskeytown frontman Ryan Adams, and she calls it "something acoustic and simple to fall at the end of the record".

== Promotion and release ==
For the promotion of the album, Moore performed an exclusive concert for the winning town of the "Love at First Sniff" competition on Gain's official site. The town that has the most stories placed on the website wins the competition and gets the concert hosted there.

Moore visited a number of talk shows including The Ellen DeGeneres Show and The Tonight Show with Jay Leno. On both shows, she performed the album's single "I Could Break Your Heart Any Day of the Week" to promote the album. On May 26, 2009, she performed songs from the album at Amoeba Music in Hollywood, together with Mike Viola, the day it was released by Storefront Records.

On March 17, 2009, the album's lead single "I Could Break Your Heart Any Day of the Week" was released as a digital download on iTunes. This was the date of the pre-ordering for the album. Also that day, Moore's official website shared clips from all the songs from the standard edition of the album. Two of the album's songs, "Fern Dell" and "Love to Love Me Back", were made available for streaming at her Myspace page a few days after.

According to a post in a blog on her website, it would be released digitally globally on September 29, a little more than four months after its initial release. The album was released in Brazil on June 28, 2010, and in Argentina in November 2011.

== Critical reception ==
Professional ratings
Review scores
Source	Rating
AllMusic	link
Associated Press	positive link
The Boston Globe	positive link
The Dallas Morning News	B+ link
Entertainment Weekly	B+ Amanda Leigh
The Hartford Courant	positive link
IGN	(7.4/10) link
Metromix	link
Rolling Stone	link
Slant Magazine	link

At Metacritic, which assigns a normalized rating out of 100 to reviews from mainstream critics, the album scored 70, indicating "generally favorable reviews".

Entertainment Weekly gave the album a B+, calling it "much more fun" than its predecessor Wild Hope and praised the songs "Merrimack River", "Pocket Philosopher" and "Song About Home". The album topped the website's Must List the week it was released.

Stephen Thomas Erlewine of AllMusic called the album a "clean, classy collection of AAA pop."

IGN said, "With Amanda Leigh, Moore has succeeded in crafting a personal record that is entertaining, even compelling at times, but isn't weighed down by heavy themes, misguided irony, or complex arrangements."

The Dallas Morning News said, "Amanda Leigh turns more compelling with each listen...How great that she left the Britney Spears factory behind."

== Commercial performance ==
Amanda Leigh debuted at number 25 on the US Billboard 200, selling 15,000 copies in its first week of release. It is Moore's third-highest peaking album to date.

== Track listing ==
All songs written by Mandy Moore and Mike Viola, except where noted. All songs produced by Mike Viola.

No.	Title	Writer(s)	Length
1.	"Merrimack River"		4:24
2.	"Fern Dell"		3:01
3.	"I Could Break Your Heart Any Day of the Week"		2:49
4.	"Pocket Philosopher"		3:15
5.	"Song About Home"	Mandy Moore, Mike Viola, Inara George	3:54
6.	"Everblue"	Moore, Lori McKenna	4:13
7.	"Merrimack River (Reprise)"	Viola	0:59
8.	"Love to Love Me Back"	Moore, Viola, George	4:12
9.	"Indian Summer"	Moore, Viola, George	2:20
10.	"Nothing Everything"		4:21
11.	"Bug"		2:16
Total length:			37:57

South American bonus track
No.	Title	Length
12.	"Fern Dell" (Original Demo)	2:13
Total length:		40:10

Target bonus tracks
No.	Title	Writer(s)	Length
12.	"Fern Dell" (Original Demo)		2:13
13.	"Love to Love Me Back" (Original Demo)	Moore, Viola, George	3:38
Total length:			43:48

iTunes bonus tracks
No.	Title	Length
12.	"I Could Break Your Heart Any Day of the Week" (Living Room Demo)	2:51
13.	"Audio Track by Track"	11:24
Total length:		52:12

WalMart bonus tracks
No.	Title	Length
12.	"Merrimack River" (Original Performance Series)	4:45
13.	"Nothing Everything" (Original Performance Series)	3:42
Total length:		46:24

== Charts ==
Chart (2009)	Peak position
US Billboard 200	25
US Billboard Top Independent Albums	4
US Billboard Top Digital Albums	12
