= Silver Landings =

Studio album by Mandy Moore
- Released: March 6, 2020
- Genres: Soft rock; folk; country
- Length: 41:03
- Label: Verve Forecast
- Producer: Mike Viola

Mandy Moore chronology
Amanda Leigh (2009)	Silver Landings (2020)	In Real Life (2022)

Singles from Silver Landings
- 1. "When I Wasn't Watching" Released: September 17, 2019; 2. "I'd Rather Lose" Released: October 31, 2019; 3. "Save a Little for Yourself" Released: January 14, 2020; 4. "Fifteen" Released: February 11, 2020

Silver Landings is the sixth studio album by American singer-songwriter Mandy Moore, released on March 6, 2020, via Verve Forecast Records. It is her first studio album in 11 years, following her fifth studio album Amanda Leigh (2009). Moore was due to promote the album with a North American tour, before it was postponed due to the COVID-19 pandemic.

Silver Landings received generally positive reviews from music critics. On Metacritic, the album has a weighted average score of 75 out of 100, based on ten critics, indicating "generally favorable reviews". The album debuted and peaked at number 134 on the US Billboard 200 chart with 6,800 units sold in its first week.

== Background ==
In July 2012, Moore announced that she would be collaborating with her then-husband, musician Ryan Adams, on her upcoming album. She said, "There's tremendous influence right now around the house... from the music I've been introduced to and being very happy and in a healthy, happy relationship… I think that still garners a lot of material to write about." In a July 2014 interview with CBS News, Moore said that 2014 was "the year of actual progress forward" on her upcoming album and said it was more "dangerous" and "raw" than her previous albums, and said that she hoped to start recording the album in Adams's studio later in the summer. In September 2015, Moore said that she was continuing to work on the album. "I've been working on music steadily for the last couple of years," she explained. "I guess 2016 will be the re-emergence of my music. That side of my life has been dormant for too long in my opinion."

In July 2017, following her divorce from Adams, Moore announced her intentions to return to music in an interview with People. She said, "I want to return to music" and that "I don't have a record label, but I have a lot of music written. Next year, I've decided I'm putting it out there!" In July 2018, she also said on Jimmy Kimmel Live! that she might collaborate with her future husband, musician Taylor Goldsmith, on her new music. Subsequently, Goldsmith co-wrote all the songs on Silver Landings together with Moore.

== Promotion ==
After teasing fans with snippets of new music and photos from the studio throughout the year, on September 17, 2019, Moore released her first original song in over a decade, the single "When I Wasn't Watching", with an accompanying music video; this was followed by the single "I'd Rather Lose" on October 31. In January 2020, Moore said in an interview with Billboard that the album was titled Silver Landings and would be released in early March, via Verve Forecast Records. She said regarding her decision to sign with Verve Forecast in late 2019, "I had slight PTSD from being on labels in the past [...] but Verve truly feels like it's run by a bunch of deeply creative people who aren't necessarily just concerned with the numbers game". Moore later announced a release date of March 6, along with a North American tour to promote the album beginning on March 20, and also released the single "Save a Little for Yourself" with an accompanying music video. A fourth single, "Fifteen", was released in February. The tour was later postponed due to the COVID-19 pandemic.

== Critical reception ==
Professional ratings
Aggregate scores
Source	Rating
AnyDecentMusic?	7.2/10
Metacritic	75/100
Review scores
Source	Rating
AllMusic	4/5 stars
The A.V. Club	B
Exclaim!	7/10
The Independent	4/5 stars
Paste Magazine	7.2/10
Pitchfork	7.1/10
PopMatters	7/10 stars
Slant Magazine	3.5/5 stars

Silver Landings received generally positive reviews from music critics. On Metacritic, the album has a weighted average score of 75 out of 100, based on ten critics, indicating "generally favorable reviews". Aggregator AnyDecentMusic? gave it 7.2 out of 10, based on their assessment of the critical consensus.

Writing for The Independent, Alexandra Pollard wrote, "Musically, it's lovely – loose, swirling California rock and country, led by gaze-out-the-train-window melodies," and added that the album "will leave a mark – one that is Moore's and Moore's alone." On the online music database AllMusic, critic Timothy Monger opined, "Between its warm sonic patina and the personal nature of its material, Silver Landings stands as Moore's most mature work to date, making for a strong if understated comeback. Likewise, The A.V. Club's Gwen Ihnat said in her review that Moore "has finally grown into the adult voice that sounded so jarring in her teenaged hits like "Candy"," and that her songwriting "reveals a sadder, wiser maturity."

Laura Stanley of Exclaim! gave the album a favorable review, stating that the album "shows Moore unburdened and the joy she finds in being honest is both heartening and inspiring." Writing for Paste Magazine, Eric Danton said, "If Silver Landings isn't a world-beating collection of songs, it's a promising return for an artist who is rediscovering her voice, and what she can do with it." Pop Matters critic Jeffrey Davies stated positive opinions regarding the album, saying that it is an "intimate portrait of adulthood and a look at life on the other side of achieving fame at a young age. For audiences who grew up listening to artists like Moore, it's an absolute privilege to get to experience this glimpse into who she is now and how she got there." Writing for Pitchfork, Brad Nelson gave the album a favorable review, stating that Mike Viola's production and Dawes' Taylor Goldsmith's songwriting on the album gives it "a feeling of domestic warmth and security". Nelson further writes about Silver Landings lyrics, saying that "Moore's lyrics speak from a shakier place; she can't experience the security of the present moment without also seeing it crash into the insecurity of the next." On Slant Magazine, Seth Wilson wrote, "By drawing on the sounds of '70s singer-songwriters, Moore has successfully completed the transition from her teen-pop origins to adult troubadour." Albumism ranked Silver Landings at number 17 of 100 Best Albums of 2020.

== Commercial performance ==
Silver Landings debuted at number 134 on the US Billboard 200 chart with 6,800 album equivalent units on its first week, which consisted of 6,200 pure album copies and 600 album stream units, according to Rolling Stone charts. It was Moore's first studio album to not enter the Top 100, the album only spent one week on the chart.

== Track listing ==
All music is produced by Mike Viola.

Silver Landings track listing
No.	Title	Writer(s)	Length
1.	"I'd Rather Lose"	Mandy Moore; Mike Viola; Taylor Goldsmith; Sean Douglas	3:45
2.	"Save a Little for Yourself"	Moore; Viola; Goldsmith; Douglas	3:39
3.	"Fifteen"	Moore; Viola; Goldsmith; Jason Boesel	4:09
4.	"Tryin' My Best, Los Angeles"	Moore; Viola; Goldsmith; Douglas	4:01
5.	"Easy Target"	Moore; Viola; Goldsmith; Chris Walla	4:38
6.	"When I Wasn't Watching"	Moore; Viola; Goldsmith; Boesel	3:29
7.	"Forgiveness"	Moore; Viola; Goldsmith; Boesel	4:36
8.	"Stories Reminding Myself of Me"	Moore; Viola; Goldsmith; Douglas	3:57
9.	"If That's What It Takes"	Moore; Viola; Goldsmith; Lori McKenna	4:06
10.	"Silver Landings"	Moore; Viola; Goldsmith; Natalie Hemby	4:43
Total length:			41:03

Target bonus tracks
No.	Title	Writer(s)	Length
11.	"Give Me Back My Heart"	Moore; Viola; Goldsmith	4:22
12.	"When I Wasn't Watching" (acoustic)	Moore; Viola; Goldsmith; Boesel	3:32
Total length:			48:57

== Personnel ==
Credits adapted from Tidal.

- Mandy Moore – vocals
- Dave Cerminara – mixing
- David Boucher – recording (tracks 2, 3, 5, 6, 7, 9, 10)
- Eric Boulanger – mastering
- Mike Viola – recording, production, composer
- Wesley Seidman – recording (tracks 1, 4, 8), assistant recording (tracks 2, 6, 7)
- Alan Hampton – bass (tracks 3, 9,10)
- Tyler Chester – bass (tracks 1, 2, 4, 8), piano (tracks 3, 9), electric piano (track 10), keyboards (track 7)
- Taylor Goldsmith – drums (track 1), electric guitar (tracks 1, 2, 4, 8, 9, 10), guitar (track 3)
- Griffin Goldsmith – drums (tracks 2, 3, 4, 5, 6, 7, 8, 9, 10)
- Davey Faragher – electric bass (tracks 2, 6, 9), bass (tracks 5, 7)
- Sean Douglas – piano (tracks 2, 4, 8)

== Charts ==
Chart performance for Silver Landings
Chart (2020)	Peak position
US Billboard 200	134
