= Play with Your Head =

Studio album by Candy Butchers
- Released: March 12, 2002
- Genre: Power pop
- Length: 37:00
- Label: Sony/RPM Records

Candy Butchers chronology
Let's Get Christmas (1999)	Play with Your Head (2002)	Hang On Mike (2004)

Mike Viola chronology
Temple of Static (2001)	Play with Your Head (2002)	Hang On Mike (2004)

Professional ratings
Review scores
Source	Rating
AllMusic	4/5 stars

Play with Your Head is a studio album by Candy Butchers released in 2002.

== Track listing ==
1. "Worry My Dome" - 2:44
2. "My Monkey Made a Man Out of Me" - 2:37
3. "You Belong to Me Now" - 3:10
4. "Ruby's Got a Big Idea" - 3:15
5. "Tough Hang" - 3:41
6. "Baby, It's a Long Way Down" - 3:53
7. "It's a Line" - 3:43
8. "I Let Her Get Away" - 3:03
9. "My Heart Isn't in It" - 2:37
10. "Make No Mistake" - 4:56
11. "Call Off the Dogs" - 3:21
