= Just Before Dark =

Just before Dark

Live album by Mike Viola
- Released: December 13, 2005
- Genre: Acoustic, folk
- Length: 28:32
- Label: Good Morning Monkey

Mike Viola chronology
Hang On Mike (2004)	Just before Dark (2005)	Making Up Time (2006)

Just before Dark is a live album by Mike Viola that was released in 2005. In addition to being on CD, it has also been released on vinyl.

== Track listing ==
1. "Hair of the Dog" - 3:20
2. "Sandi Bright" - 3:23
3. "Number Crunch" - 3:00
4. "Sound of My Own Voice" - 2:50
5. "Sun Drenched - 3:17
6. "A Way to Say Goodbye" - 3:06
7. "Clusterfuck" - 3:46
8. "Rowing Song" - 3:31
9. "Just before Dark" - 2:19
