= Ryan Adams & the Shining =

The Shining
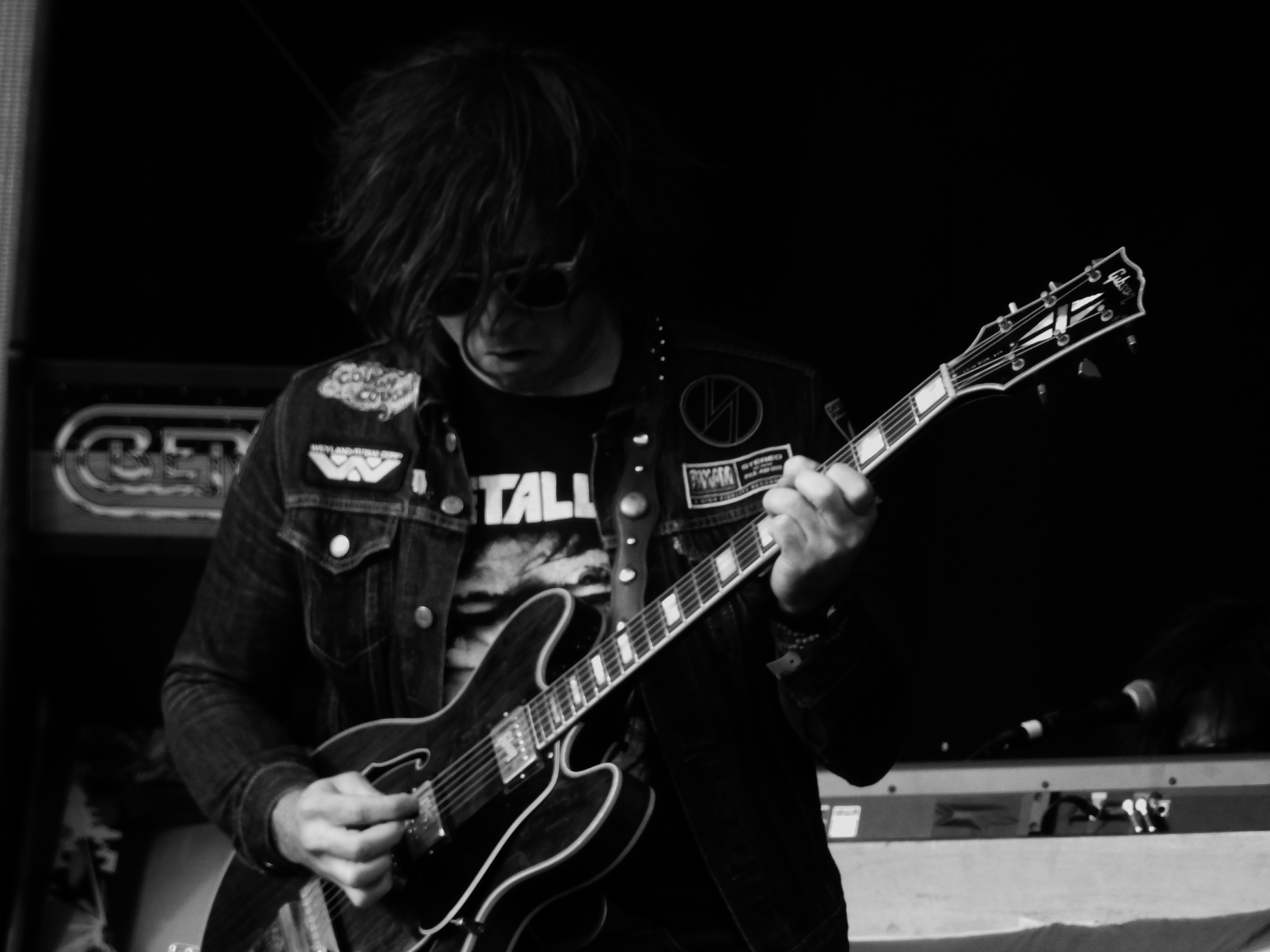
- Clapham Common, Calling Festival, London – July 4, 2015

Background information
- Origin: Los Angeles, USA
- Genres: Alternative country, rock, jam rock
- Years active: 2014–2016
- Past members: Ryan Adams; Mike Viola; Charlie Stavish; Daniel Clarke; Freddie Bokkenheuser

The Shining were an American rock band that were formed in 2014 by singer-songwriter Ryan Adams. Although the band had played a few shows together previously, they made their first performance under the Shining moniker on August 13, 2014, on The Tonight Show Starring Jimmy Fallon. The Shining also performed as one of the final musical acts on Late Show with David Letterman.

== History ==
Adams started the band after he and guitarist Mike Viola co-produced his self-titled record Ryan Adams record together. Adams had known bassist Charlie Stavish since 2006 as an engineer who had worked on many of his records. He first met Viola and keyboardist Daniel Clarke when touring with his ex-wife Mandy Moore. Drummer Freddie Bokkenheuser completed the band after an audition.

Compared to his previous band, The Cardinals, Adams expressed a preference for going into the "exploration zone" with the Shining on his older songs and that rehearsals with the new band were a "very beautiful process". In a 2014 concert review, the Village Voice noted that "the Shining bring a slightly garage-ier take on early '80s classic rock, like Springsteen or Tom Petty, with that reliable Adams reference of a bit of Paul Westerberg raggedness". In a 2016 review of the Shining, Ben Kaye from Consequence of Sound marvelled at "...how in sync they all are. Not only do they provide glorious harmonies and ripping solos of their own, but they give Adams every bit of the platform a true bandleader needs." In reflecting further on the chemistry of the band, Fred Schruers from Billboard Magazine wrote in another review: "When the band took off on disciplined-if-deeply committed jams, Adams was just as likely to start trading phrases with keyboardist Daniel Clarke as with guitarist Viola, and the rhythm section of bassist Charlie Stavish and drummer Freddy Bokkenheuser (the latter with a woodchopper's hammering energy) seemed to enjoy the musical interplay, and their bandleader's japes, as much as anyone on the entire hillside."

In addition to extensive touring to support Adams' self-titled album, Adams and Stavish also continued to collaborate on recording projects, including 7" releases for Adams and solo EP's for Shining band members Viola and Clarke. And, by fall of 2016, the band began to work on and debut live new material for Adams' next record.

The group ultimately headed into Adams' PAX AM recording studio to attempt recording as a band. They made progress on the track "Do You Still Love Me", which would eventually appear on Adams' next Album Prisoner. However, Adams otherwise felt that the band had lost "some of the magic" that they had experienced together on tour. He subsequently focused on recording the rest of the new album himself and put together a new band, only including Stavish on bass, to support the new record.

== Band members ==
- Ryan Adams – vocals, guitar, harmonica
- Mike Viola – guitar, vocals
- Daniel Clarke – keyboards, vocals
- Charlie Stavish – bass guitar
- Freddie Bokkenheuser – drums
