= Re-Covered =

Re-Covered (album)

Studio album by Dan Wilson
- Released: August 4, 2017
- Recorded: 2015–17
- Studios: United Studios; Ballroom West; Fantasy Studios
- Genre: Rock
- Length: 51:43
- Labels: Big Deal Media; Ballroom Music
- Producers: Mike Viola; Dan Wilson

Dan Wilson chronology
Love Without Fear (2014)	Re-Covered (album) (2017)

Re-Covered is the third studio album from singer, songwriter, producer, and multi-instrumentalist Dan Wilson, released on August 4, 2017, via Ballroom Music and Big Deal Media.

== Background and composition ==
Re-Covered is a collection of reinterpretations of songs Wilson wrote for other artists including Adele, Dixie Chicks, Chris Stapleton, Taylor Swift, and more.

== Reception ==
The album was met with resoundingly positive reception from critics, seeing coverage from the Associated Press, Rolling Stone, Billboard, Stereogum, ABC News, LA Weekly, Salon, the Los Angeles Times, The Washington Post, Variety, and the New York Daily News. The album was announced on June 1, 2017, in an interview with Zane Lowe on Apple's Beats1 Radio alongside the worldwide premiere of pre-release track "Someone Like You", which Wilson co-wrote with Adele. Kronos Quartet is featured on Wilson's Re-Covered version of the song.

== Track listing ==
Re-Covered
No.	Title	Writer(s)	Length
1.	"All Will Be Well"	Gabe Dixon; Dan Wilson	4:43
2.	"Home"	Brett Beavers; Dierks Bentley; Wilson	4:40
3.	"You and I"	John Legend; Malay; Dave Tozer; Wilson	4:36
4.	"Someone Like You" (featuring Kronos Quartet)	Adele Adkins; Wilson	4:49
5.	"Never Meant to Love You"	Cory Chisel; Wilson	3:44
6.	"Not Ready to Make Nice"	Natalie Maines; Martie Maguire; Emily Robison; Wilson	3:42
7.	"Landing"	Dan Wilson; Matt Wilson	2:50
8.	"Treacherous"	Taylor Swift; Wilson	3:40
9.	"Borrowed"	Darrell Brown; LeAnn Rimes; Wilson	3:26
10.	"Your Misfortune"	Mike Doughty; Wilson	3:04
11.	"When the Stars Come Out"	Chris Stapleton; Wilson	3:58
12.	"If I Walk Away"	Josh Groban; Wilson	3:58
13.	"Closing Time"	Wilson	4:33

== Personnel ==
Performers and musicians

- Dan Wilson – lead vocals, guitars, piano
- Mike Viola – guitars, vocals
- Jake Sinclair – bass
- Pete Thomas – drums, percussion
- Daniel Clarke – keyboards
- Kronos Quartet:
  - David Harrington (violin)
  - John Sherba (violin)
  - Hank Dutt (viola)
  - Sunny Yang (cello)
  (track 4)
- Brad Gordon – piano, pump organ, horns, Wurlitzer piano (tracks 1, 4)
- Sean Watkins – guitars (track 1)
- Jacob Slichter – string arrangement (track 4)

Production

- Produced by Mike Viola and Dan Wilson
- Recorded by Jake Sinclair and John Rausch
- Mixed by Jake Sinclair
- Mastered by Richard Dodd
- John Sinclair recorded and mixed "All Will Be Well", "Someone Like You", and "Closing Time" (tracks 1, 4, 13)
- John Rausch recorded "Your Misfortune" and "When The Stars Come Out" (tracks 10, 11)
- Charlie Stavish mixed "Your Misfortune" and "When The Stars Come Out" (tracks 10, 11)
- Kronos Quartet recorded by Scott Fraser (track 4)
- Brian W. Brundage – additional recording

Design

- Art Director: Dave Bett
- Photos: Noah Lamberth
- Cover art, illustrations, lettering, and font by Dan Wilson
