= J.S. Ondara =

American singer-songwriter

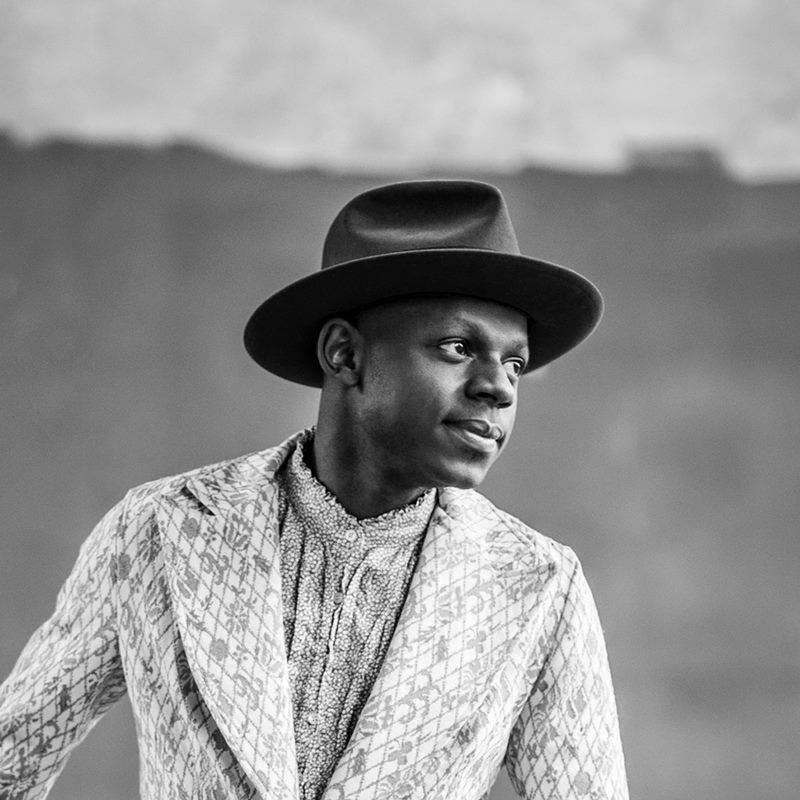

Background information
- Born: Nairobi, Kenya
- Origin: Minneapolis, Minnesota, United States
- Genres: Americana, folk
- Instruments: Vocals, guitar
- Labels: Verve Forecast
- Website: www.spanishvillager.com

J.S. Ondara, known mononymously as Ondara, is a Grammy Award-nominated Kenyan and American singer-songwriter, whose debut album, Tales of America, was released on February 15, 2019 via Verve Forecast. The critical success of the debut led to a follow-up deluxe edition, Tales of America: The Second Coming, in September 2019 featuring the original lineup plus five bonus tracks.

== Biography ==
Ondara was born in August 1992 in Nairobi, Kenya. As a child, he wrote poems and stories as well as songs despite not having an instrument to play them on because his family could not afford one. He was inspired by Radiohead, Nirvana, Death Cab For Cutie, Jeff Buckley, Pearl Jam, Guns N' Roses, and Bob Dylan.

Ondara grew up listening to rock songs on his older sisters’ battery-powered radio. Having discovered The Freewheelin' Bob Dylan following a dispute with a friend over whether "Knockin' on Heaven's Door" was a Guns N' Roses song, Ondara resolved to travel to the United States to pursue a career in music.

In February 2013, after winning in the green card lottery, Ondara moved to Minneapolis, Minnesota at the age of 20. He taught himself to play guitar and perform during open mic nights. Eventually, he decided to study music therapy in college, but dropped out of school to return to playing small shows at coffee houses after attending a concert.

== Musical career ==
After moving to Minnesota, Ondara tried his hand at making music and performing in small venues. His big break came when Minneapolis-St. Paul radio station KCMP 89.3 The Current, located in St. Paul, played one of his songs on air by pulling audio from his YouTube channel, where he had been uploading covers of his favorite songs.

Ondara's debut album, Tales of America, was released in February 2019 by Verve Label Group. Despite only 11 tracks making the final tracklist, Ondara wrote more than 100 songs for the album, all based on an immigrant's life in America. The album was produced by Mike Viola of the Candy Butchers. In support of the album, Ondara embarked on his first headlining tour in March 2019. After the release of the album, Ondara debuted on Billboard's Emerging Artist chart at No. 37 in March 2019. The album also landed on the Billboard Heatseekers Album, Americana/Folk Album Sales, and Rock Album Sales charts. He was nominated for Best Emerging Act at the 2019 Americana Music Honors & Awards.

Ondara cites Bob Dylan as his musical hero, which is why he chose to live in Minnesota, and why he wears his signature fedora.

He has toured with the Milk Carton Kids, Lindsey Buckingham and in 2019, he opened for select dates on tour with Neil Young. In early 2020, he opened for The Lumineers on their III world tour.

Ondara was nominated for 'Best Americana Album' at the 62nd Annual Grammy Awards for his album, Tales of America.

In May of 2023, it was announced that Ondara was the Grand Prize winner of the 2022 International Songwriting Competition (ISC) for the song "An Alien In Minneapolis."

== Discography ==
=== Album ===
- Tales of America (2019)
- Folk N' Roll, Vol 1: Tales of Isolation (2020)
- Spanish Villager No. 3 (2022)

=== Singles ===
Title	Year	Peak chart positions	Album
Title	Year	US AAA	Album
"Lebanon"	2019	23	Tales of America
