= Warped Tour 1996 =

1996 Vans Warped concert tour

- Tour by Warped Tour
- Warped Tour 1996 logo
- Location: North America
- Start date: July 4, 1996
- End date: August 8, 1996
- No. of shows: 24

Warped Tour concert chronology
- Warped Tour 1995; Warped Tour 1996; Warped Tour 1997

Warped Tour 1996 was the 2nd edition of the Vans Warped Tour, and the first Warped Tour to be sponsored by Vans. The 24-date tour began on July 4, 1996 in Phoenix, Arizona and ended August 8, 1996 in Panama City, Florida.

The tour featured a main stage and a second stage, on which bands alternated so that as one band finished playing, the band on the other stage would begin. The band lineups and running orders on the two stages differed between dates. Some shows also featured a third stage with additional bands. All shows were held in outdoor venues with the exception of the shows in Washington D.C. and Milwaukee, Wisconsin. The former show was originally scheduled for Merriweather Post Pavilion in Columbia, Maryland, but due to issues with the venue, the show was moved at the last minute to the much smaller The Capitol Ballroom nightclub. The tour headliners included Fishbone, The Mighty Mighty Bosstones, NOFX, Pennywise, and Rocket from the Crypt.

This was the first Warped Tour for The Mighty Mighty Bosstones, NOFX, Pennywise, and Blink-182, all of which played on multiple future Warped Tours. According to tour founder Kevin Lyman, the addition of punk bands such as NOFX and Pennywise helped establish the tour as a "credible" punk festival, thus making it more successful than the first year's eclectic lineup. A 2011 Warped Tour retrospective article in the Dallas Observer deemed the 1996 lineup one of the four best ever Warped Tour lineups in its 17-year history up to that point.

== Vans sponsorship ==
Lyman sought a sponsor after promoters refused to pay for the tour in its second year because the first edition of the tour the year before had not made money. After a planned meeting with Calvin Klein was delayed by a blizzard, he received a call from Vans who wanted to launch an amateur skateboarding contest at the festival. Lyman, who was "desperate for money to keep the tour going", convinced them to sponsor the tour for $300,000. Vans later gave Lyman an additional $100,000 to buy back merchandising rights to the tour that he had already sold to another company. With the sponsorship, Lyman said that the tour "just survived the second year" and "paid everyone back from the first year."

== Bands ==
- 311
- The Alkaholiks
- Beck
- Blink 182
- CIV
- Dance Hall Crashers
- Deftones
- Dick Dale
- Down By Law
- Face To Face
- The Figgs
- Fishbone
- Fluf
- Goldfinger
- The Mighty Mighty Bosstones
- Insane Clown Posse
- NOFX
- Mushroomhead
- Pennywise
- Reel Big Fish
- Rocket From the Crypt
- Sense Field
- Unwritten Law
- Lagwagon
- White Kaps
- The Meices
- Screaming Bloody Marys

== Tour dates ==
Date	City	Country	Venue
July 4, 1996	Phoenix	United States	Desert Sky Pavilion
July 5, 1996	San Diego	United States	San Diego Sports Arena
July 6, 1996	Carson	United States	Olympic Velodrome
July 7, 1996	San Francisco	United States	Crissy Field
July 9, 1996	Salem	United States	LB Day Amphitheater
July 10, 1996	Vancouver	Canada	Plaza of Nations
July 11, 1996	Tacoma	United States	Tacoma Dome
July 13, 1996	Salt Lake City	United States	Utah State Fair
July 14, 1996	Morrison	United States	Red Rocks Amphitheatre
July 16, 1996	Bonner Springs	United States	Sandstone Amphitheater
July 19, 1996	Milwaukee	United States	Eagles Ballroom
July 20, 1996	Maryland Heights	United States	Riverport Amphitheater
July 21, 1996	Chicago	United States	United Center
July 22, 1996	Clarkston	United States	Pine Knob Music Theatre
July 23, 1996	Pittsburgh	United States	IC Light
July 24, 1996	Cleveland	United States	Cloverleaf Flea Market
July 25, 1996	Cincinnati	United States	Riverbend Second Stage
July 26, 1996	Buffalo	United States	La Salle Park
July 27, 1996	Bowmanville	Canada	Mosport Park
July 28, 1996	Montreal	Canada	Blue Bonnets (raceway)
July 30, 1996	Northampton	United States	Northampton Airport
July 31, 1996	Washington, D.C.	United States	The Capitol Ballroom
August 1, 1996	Camden	United States	Blockbuster Sony Entertainment Center
August 2, 1996	Vernon	United States	Action Park
August 3, 1996	East Falmouth	United States	Barnstable County Fairgrounds
August 4, 1996	Asbury Park	United States	The Stone Pony
August 6, 1996	Jacksonville	United States	Metropolitan Park
August 8, 1996	Panama City	United States	Club LaVela
August 9, 1996	Cocoa	United States	Cocoa Expo
