= Noam Weinstein =

American singer-songwriter

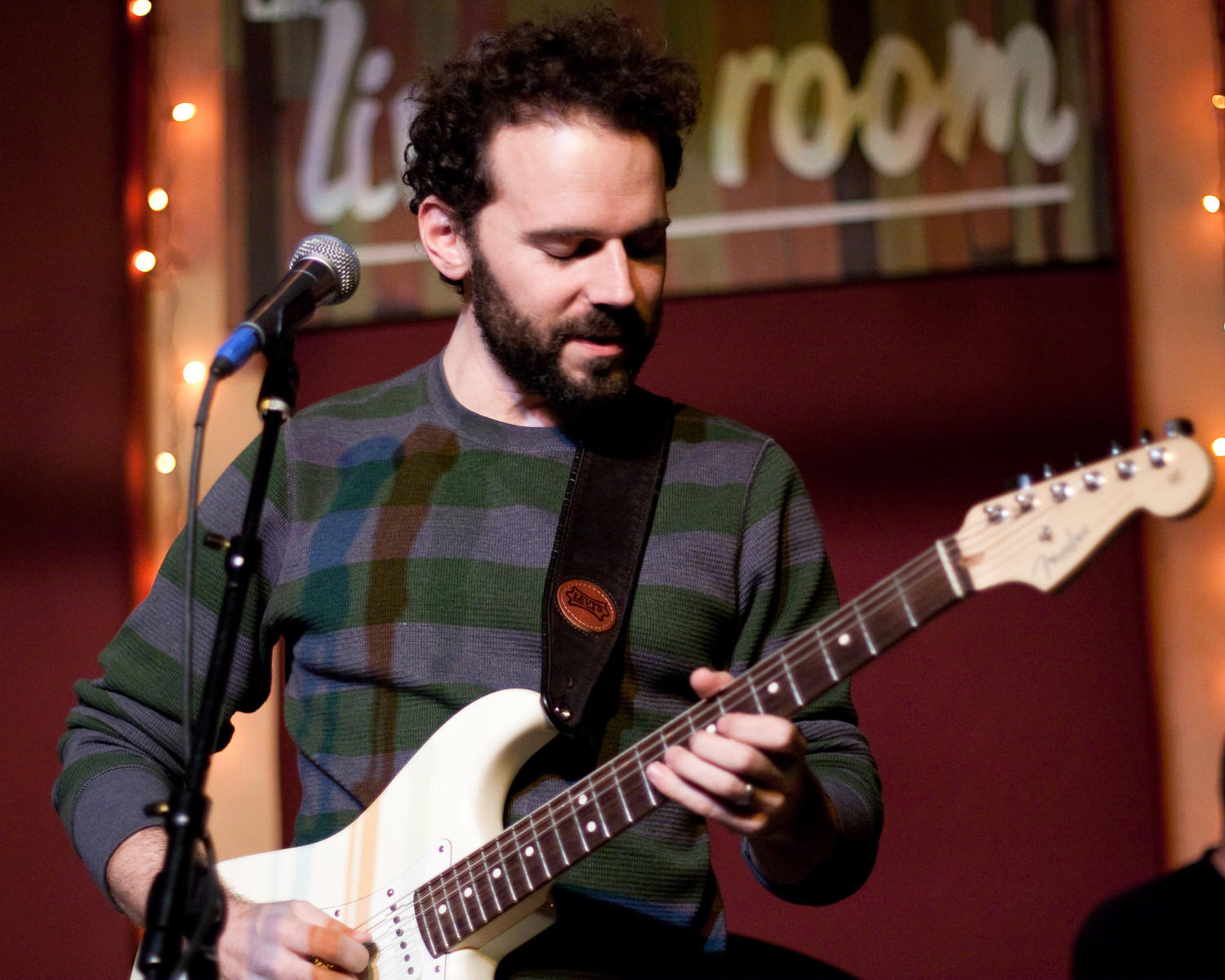
- Noam at The Living Room in NYC, 1/14/10

Background information
- Born: Noam Isaac Weinstein; May 7, 1977 (age 48); Cambridge, Massachusetts
- Origin: New York, New York
- Genres: Pop rock, Folk Pop; Indie Pop, Americana
- Occupations: songwriter, performer
- Instruments: voice, guitar, piano
- Years active: 2001-
- Labels: No Songs, Skycap Records
- Website: www.enoam.com

Noam Weinstein (no-ahm wyne-styne) is an American singer-songwriter and musician. He is best known for his studio recordings and his collaborations with other artists such as Mike Viola, Heather Masse, Sam Sadigursky, and Norah Jones.

== Early Years ==
Noam Weinstein grew up in Cambridge, Massachusetts and began playing guitar as a child and performing at local clubs during high school. In 1999 he moved to New York City and joined the Greenwich Village songwriting community led by Jack Hardy. From 2001-2014 he released seven albums (six studio projects and one recorded live at The Living Room); an eighth, the compilation Sixteen Skies, was distributed in Europe.

== Recent Work ==
On April 15th, 2026, Noam released Male Model, containing "twelve pieces by and about the perfect man." (Its cover shows an in-progress marionette of Noam.) The album features Carla Azar, Griffin Goldsmith, Mike Viola, Rose Polenzani, Sam Sadigursky and many others. Produced by Noam, and co-produced by Mike Viola, it was recorded and mixed by Tyler Chester at Bell Choir studios in Los Angeles, and mastered by Jeff Lipton in Boston.

Male Model is the follow up to 2024's Iris Iris, a suite of songs about "seeing double visions and thinking double thoughts." Contributors included Tyler Wood (who also recorded and mixed it), Dan Rieser, Ross Gallagher, Jess Tardy, Alec Spiegelman, Anita Suhanin and more. The track "Present and Accounted For" was awarded first prize in the Rock category of the 2024 USA Songwriting Contest.

2022's Undivorceable was a collection about "the bonds that can't be broken, whether between a husband and his former wife, a father and his children or a citizen and his skin color." It was produced by Mike Viola, recorded by Pierre de Reeder and mastered by Eric Boulanger.The Daily Vault called it "a captivating listen, both devastatingly honest and immensely tuneful."

2020's 42 1/2 was "inspired by that magical time when both the wild innocence of a 42-year-old and the sober wisdom of a 43-year-old are just out of reach." Rolling Stone Germany described it as "folk-pop masterpieces."

And 2016's On Waves celebrated "cycles, storms, mystery channels, and the beats beyond." The Daily Vault said it was "heart-wrenching," "dazzling with its musical audacity," and "genuinely moving," while Popdose wrote that it was "terrific", and No Depression called it "catchy", "heartfelt", "hilarious" and "beautiful".

== Recognition ==
Although lesser known than many of his collaborators, Weinstein has received critical acclaim in publications like Performing Songwriter, The New Yorker, and The Boston Globe, and airplay on prominent independent radio stations such as WFUV, WXPN, and WERS. His song "Fragile" was recorded by Norah Jones and included on the reissue of her debut album, Come Away With Me, while "I Can Hurt People" was featured on the Showtime series Weeds, and several others have been recorded by indie artists such as Mieka Pauley, Greta Gertler, Mark Whitaker, Jess Tardy, and Lin McEwan.</ref>

== Discography ==
=== As Leader ===
- Enough About You (2001)
- Above The Music (2002)
- Probably Human (2004)
- We're All Going There (2006)
- Sixteen Skies (2009)
- Found Alive (2010)
- Clocked (2012)
- Bottlefed (2014)
- On Waves (2016)
- 42 1/2 (2020)
- Undivorceable (2022)
- Iris Iris (2024)
- Male Model (2026)

=== As Guest ===
- Jess Tardy, Waiting For You (2002)
- Greta Gertler, The Baby That Brought Bad Weather (2003)
- The Great Unknowns, Presenting The Great Unknowns (2004)
- Naomi Sommers, Gentle as The Sun (2008)
- Sam Sadigursky, Words (2009)
