= Mike Gent =

American musician

Mike Gent (born September 17, 1971 in New Jersey, United States) is an American songwriter, guitarist, and vocalist in The Figgs, in which he has performed since 1987. Gent grew up in Saratoga Springs, NY and attended Saratoga Springs High School. Gent also played with Graham Parker and Candy Butchers.

== Solo discography ==
- 1999 Received
- 2003 The Intake
- 2009 Mike Gent
- 2013 Long After Stan
- 2013 The Rapid Shave
- 2017 Headphone Music
- 2020 Singles 2018
- 2020 Archives Vol.1 - NYC 1997/1998
- 2023 Career Moves

== The Figgs discography ==
- 1992 Ginger (Cassette/LP/CD) - Absolute A Go Go / Peterwalkee / Stomper
- 1993 Ready Steady Stoned (Cassette) - Absolute A Go Go
- 1994 Low-Fi At Society High (CD/LP/Cassette) - Imago
- 1994 Hi-Fi Dropouts (CD) - Imago
- 1996 Banda Macho (CD/LP/Cassette) - Capitol Records
- 1998 The Figgs Couldn't Get High (CD/LP) - Absolute A Go Go/Stomper
- 1997 The Last Rock'N'Roll Tour (CD) - Bloodshot Records w/Graham Parker
- 1999 For EP Fans Only (CD) - Hearbox
- 2000 Rejects (LP) - Philthyrex
- 2000 Sucking In Stereo (CD/LP) - Hearbox/Peterwalkee/Stomper
- 2001 Badger (CD) - Hearbox
- 2002 Slow Charm (CD) - Hearbox
- 2003 Ready Steady Stoned (CD Deluxe Reissue) - Stomper/Sodapop
- 2003 Official Bootleg: Live Cuts From Somewhere (CD) - UpYours Records w/Graham Parker
- 2004 Palais (CD/LP) - Stomper/Sodapop/Redeye/Soo Intense
- 2005 Songs Of No Consequence (CD) - Bloodshot Records w/Graham Parker
- 2005 Continue To Enjoy The Figgs Vol. 1 (CD) - Stomper
- 2006 103° In June: Live In Chicago (CD) - Bloodshot Records w/Graham Parker
- 2006 Follow Jean Through The Sea (CD/LP) - Gern Blandsten
- 2007 Continue To Enjoy The Figgs Vol. 2 (CD) - Stomper
- 2010 The Man Who Fights Himself (CD/LP) - Stomper
- 2010 3.28.01 Kansas City, MO - The Hurricane (CD/LP) - Stomper/Peterwalkee
- 2010 Live At FTC (CD/DVD) - Image Entertainment w/Graham Parker
- 2012 The Day Gravity Stopped (CD/LP) - Stomper/Peterwalkee
- 2013 1000 People Grinning: The Figgs Anthology (CD) - Stomper
- 2013 Three For The Price Of Three! (LP Box Set) - Good Land/Stomper
- 2014 Badger LP (LP) - Stomper
- 2015 Other Planes Of Here (CD/LP) - Stomper
- 2016 On The Slide (CD/LP) - Stomper
- 2019 Shady Grove (CD/LP) - Stomper
- 2022 Chemical Shake (CD/LP) - Stomper

== The Gentlemen ==
- 2000 Ladies And Gentlemen...The Gentlemen (CD) - Hearbox/Q Division
- 2002 Blondes Prefer The Gentlemen (CD) - Sodapop/TGRC
- 2005 Brass City Band (CD) - TGRC
