= Let's Get Serious (Candy Butchers EP) =

EP by Mike Viola and the Candy Butchers
- Released: 1999
- Genre: Pop rock
- Length: 19:46
- Label: Sony/RPM

Mike Viola and the Candy Butchers chronology
Candy Butchers (1996)	Let's Get Serious (1999)	Falling into Place (1999)

Mike Viola chronology
Candy Butchers (1996)	Let's Get Serious (EP) (1999)	Falling into Place (1999)

Let's Get Serious is an EP by Mike Viola & the Candy Butchers released in 1999 in anticipation of the Candy Butchers's then-upcoming album Falling into Place.

It was rated three stars by AllMusic.

== Track listing ==
1. "Killing Floor" – 4:04
2. "Falling into Place" – 2:59
3. "Cherubino" – 3:28
4. "What Will You Do with Your Hands" – 3:41
5. "I Want You to Come Home" – 3:02
6. "Happy Birthday Risbee" – 2:32
