= The Figgs =

American rock and roll band

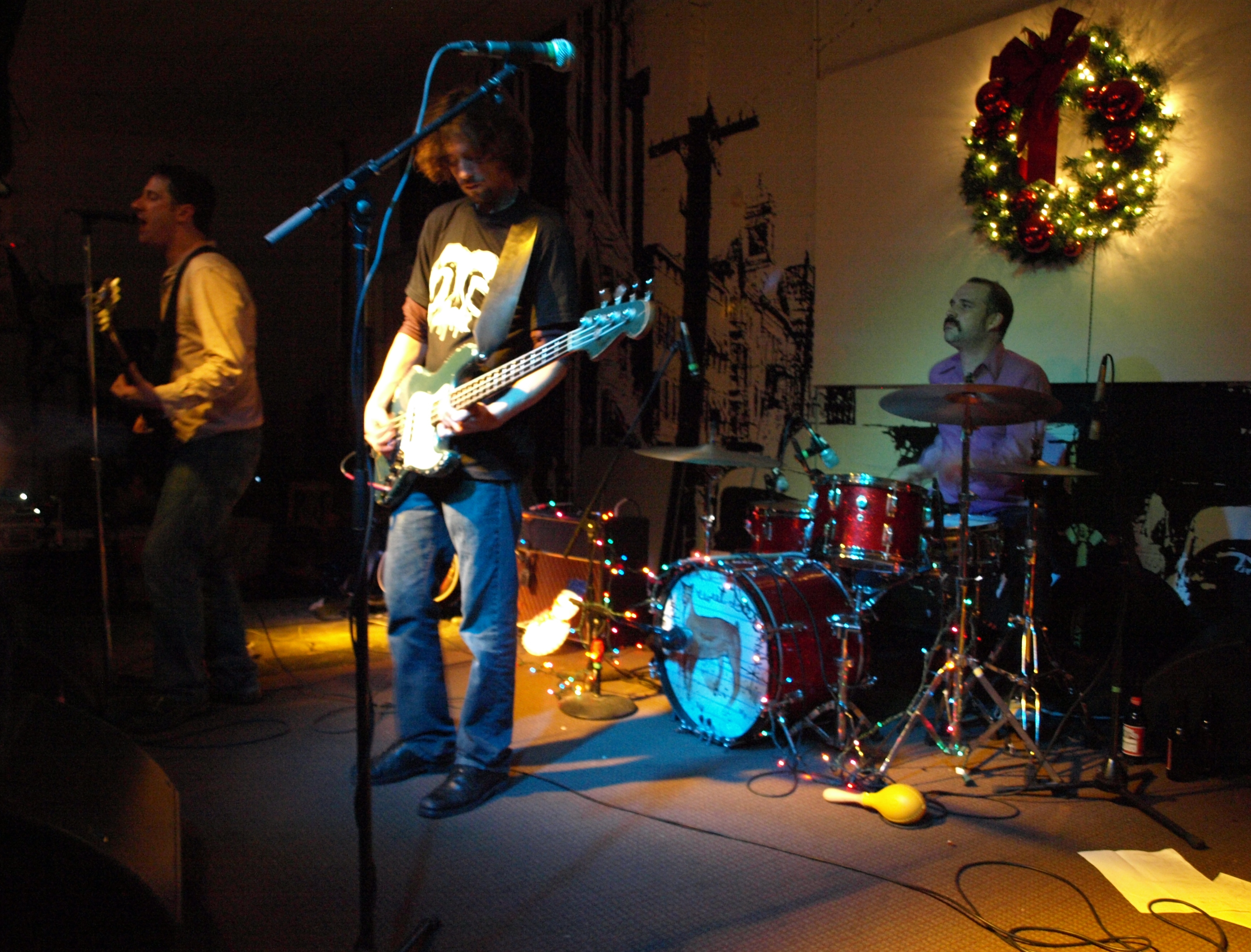
- The Figgs performing in 2009

Background information
- Origin: Saratoga Springs, New York, USA
- Genres: Garage rock, pop rock
- Years active: 1987–present
- Label: Stomper
- Members: Mike Gent; Pete Donnelly; Pete Hayes
- Past members: Guy Lyons; Mike Viola; Brett Rosenberg; Ted Collins; Jed Parish; Scott Janovitz
- Website: www.thefiggs.net

The Figgs are a rock ‘n’ roll band formed in Saratoga Springs, New York in 1987. Originally known as The Sonic Undertones, their output includes thirteen studio albums and multiple EPs and singles. They’ve served as the backing band for rock and roll legend Graham Parker on and off since 1996 and also toured with Tommy Stinson of The Replacements fame.

== History ==
The original lineup of Mike Gent (guitar), Pete Donnelly (bass), and Guy Lyons (drums), all went to high school together. Lyons temporarily left the band in 1989 and was replaced by Pete Hayes. When he returned in 1992, Hayes remained on drums and Lyons moved to lead guitar. Lyons left for good in 1997 after the recording of Couldn't Get High.

The band has continued recording and touring steadily and in 2017 celebrated their 30th anniversary with shows featuring Lyons sitting in on some of their earliest tunes. In May 2013 Lexus used The Figgs' Je T’Adore in a commercial entitled First Sight for the Lexus RX. Je T'Adore was released on the album Palais in 2004.

=== 1987-1993 ===
By 1993 The Sonic Undertones/Figgs had been performing for over half a decade and already had an album under their belt. 1992-93 was a pivotal period for the group as it saw the release of both of the first two full-length Figgs records. Ginger, recorded throughout 1992 in various New Jersey locales and the immediate follow up, Ready Steady Stoned, recorded in the Donnellys’ attic, are monuments to early 90s DIY, full of aggressive punk and shimmery pop tunes.

=== 1994–1998 ===
Imago was the first label to sign The Figgs and the resulting album, Low-Fi At Society High led to wider recognition and deepening industry interest. 1996’s Banda Macho was the band’s lone release on Capitol Records but during their brief tenure at the label one relationship was formed that would help map the course of the group’s next decade and beyond. Graham Parker was a forgotten man at Capitol in the mid 1990s but he found kindred spirits in The Figgs. Their first of many collaborations is documented on Bloodshot Records “The Last Rock And Roll Tour.” Meanwhile, the band returned to the indie world to release 1998’s The Figgs Couldn’t Get High on Absolute A Go Go Records. Produced and arranged by Andy Shernoff at Mixolydian Studios, the record would be Guy Lyons’ last with the band. Once again they would carry on as a trio.

=== 1999-2002 ===
In the spring of 1999 the remaining Figgs began work on For EP Fans Only. The EP was recorded by the band along with Andy Kravitz & Howard Bilerman, in various locations, and mastered by Brian Charles at Zippah Recording Studios in Brookline, Mass. They would return to Zippah the following summer to record the full length Sucking In Stereo, which was produced by Donnelly, Gent, and Engineer Brian Charles (Pete Linnane is co-engineer) with help from Hayes. 2001 saw the release of another EP, Badger which was recorded in various locations, including Q-Division, Amazing Barn, and Peligro Audio. They would be back at Peligro later in 2000 and again in 2001 to crank out Slow Charm with the help of producer Tim O' Heir. These titles - all released on Hearbox - show the band quickly regaining its stride as a trio.

=== 2003-2006 ===
The next few years saw the band branch out stylistically and also saw the release of the first of several career defining multi record sets. Recorded in Mike's basement in Providence, RI, Camp Street in Cambridge, MA, Brickhouse in Norristown, PA, and at Palais Royale in Bryn Mawr, PA, the resulting Palais, 25 tunes over 2 LPs/CDs, would show the band stretching out and maturing into more than the pop punk stalwarts of their youth. The CD was released on Sodapop Records in May 2004 with a deluxe silk screened vinyl edition released by Sooooo Intense Records the next December. This edition of 250 numbered vinyl sets in three different colors (Red, Blue, and Yellow) remains one of the most sought after pieces from The Figgs catalogue. Not resting on their laurels, they were back in the studio in January ‘06 working on the follow-up. Recorded at Moontower, Soundcheck Republic, Miriam Audio, and Ohm, engineered by Pete D, Scott Janovitz, Jesse Honig, and Seth Powell, and produced by the band, the resulting Follow Jean Through The Sea, released in November of ‘06 on Gern Blandstein Records, is as taut as Palais is sprawling - 10 songs over 30 minutes.

=== 2008-2010 ===
The Man Who Fights Himself, featuring the iconic cover photo by Caffe Lena's longtime sound man and caretaker, Joe Duel, was recorded in various locations from May 2008 - January 2010, and features more of the crisp pop tunes that made Follow Jean a fan favorite. Produced and mixed by the band and engineered by Pete D, Scott Janovitz, Barry Maguire, Seth Powell, Scott Riebling, and Shane Smith, it was the first full length to be released on the band's own Stomper label. The vinyl would have to wait a few years but would also bear the Stomper logo.

== Discography ==
- 1992 Ginger (cassette) - Absolute A Go Go
- 1993 Ready Steady Stoned (cassette) - Absolute A Go Go
- 1994 Low-Fi At Society High (CD/LP/Cassette) - Imago
- 1994 Hi-Fi Dropouts (CD) - Imago
- 1996 Banda Macho (CD/LP/Cassette) - Capitol Records
- 1997 The Last Rock'N'Roll Tour (CD) - Razor & Tie w/Graham Parker
- 1998 The Figgs Couldn't Get High (CD/LP) - Absolute A Go Go/Stomper
- 1999 For EP Fans Only (CD) - Hearbox
- 2000 Rejects (LP) - Philthyrex
- 2000 Sucking In Stereo (CD/LP) - Hearbox/Peterwalkee/Stomper
- 2001 Badger (CD/EP) - Hearbox
- 2002 Slow Charm (CD/Vinyl) - Hearbox/Good Land/Stomper
- 2003 Ready Steady Stoned (CD Deluxe Reissue) - Stomper/Sodapop
- 2003 Official Bootleg: Live Cuts From Somewhere (CD) - UpYours Records w/Graham Parker
- 2004 Palais (CD/LP) - Stomper/Sodapop/Redeye/Soo Intense
- 2005 Songs Of No Consequence (CD) - Bloodshot Records w/Graham Parker
- 2005 Continue To Enjoy The Figgs Vol. 1 (CD) - Stomper
- 2006 103° In June: Live In Chicago (CD) - Bloodshot Records w/Graham Parker
- 2006 Follow Jean Through The Sea (CD/LP) - Gern Blandsten
- 2007 Continue To Enjoy The Figgs Vol. 2 (CD) - Stomper
- 2010 The Man Who Fights Himself (CD/LP) - Stomper
- 2010 3.28.01 Kansas City, MO - The Hurricane (CD/LP) - Stomper/Peterwalkee
- 2010 Live At FTC (CD/DVD) - Image Entertainment w/Graham Parker
- 2012 The Day Gravity Stopped (CD/LP) - Stomper/Peterwalkee
- 2013 1000 People Grinning: The Figgs Anthology (CD) - Stomper
- 2013 Three For The Price Of Three! (LP Box Set) - Good Land/Stomper
- 2014 Badger LP (LP) - Stomper
- 2015 Other Planes Of Here (CD/LP) - Stomper
- 2016 On the Slide (CD/LP) - Stomper
- 2019 Ginger (CD/LP) - Stomper/Peterwalkee
- 2019 Shady Grove (CD/LP) - Stomper
- 2022 Chemical Shake (CD/LP) - Stomper

=== EPs ===
- 1994 Hi-Fi Dropouts (CD) - Imago
- 1999 For EP Fans Only (CD) - Hearbox
- 2001 Badger (CD) - Hearbox

=== Live albums ===
- 3.28.01 Kansas City, MO - The Hurricane (CD/Vinyl) - Stomper/Peterwalkee - 2010
- 04.16.16 Moorestown, NJ - Jen & Dave's House Concerts - (Digital) - thefiggs.com - 2016

=== Compilations ===
- 2013 1000 People Grinning: The Figgs Anthology (CD) - Stomper
