= Mike Viola =

American singer-songwriter (born 1966)

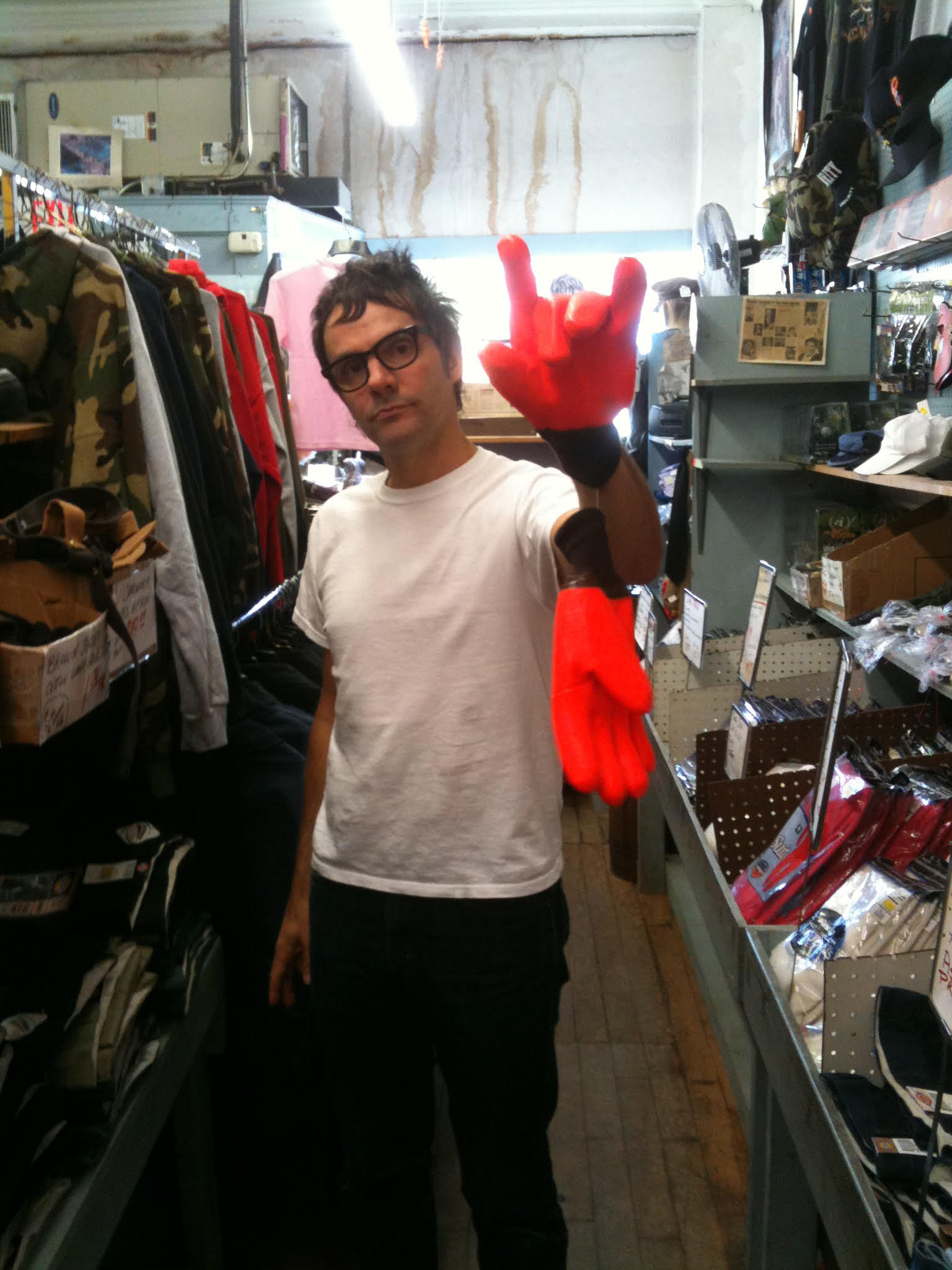
- Viola at a thrift store

Background information
- Born: Michael Anthony Viola; September 26, 1966 (age 60); Stoughton, Massachusetts, U.S.
- Genres: Rock; alternative rock; pop; folk
- Occupations: Record producer; musician; singer; songwriter
- Instruments: Vocals; guitar; piano; bass; drums
- Years active: 1985–present
- Member of: Candy Butchers
- Formerly of: The Shining
- Website: mikeviola.com

Michael Anthony Viola (born September 26, 1966) is an American record producer, musician, singer, and songwriter, best known for his work with Dawes, Panic! at the Disco, Andrew Bird, Ryan Adams, J.S. Ondara, Mandy Moore, and Jenny Lewis. His original music has been featured on soundtracks for movies such as That Thing You Do!, Walk Hard: The Dewey Cox Story, and Get Him to the Greek.

As a teenager in the early 1980s, Viola played Boston-area clubs with his band, the Bottom Line, and was billed as "Boston's youngest musical talent." His parents, Charlene and Larry Viola, bought his equipment and allowed their basement to be turned into a rehearsal room.

Viola got his major professional start in the mid-1990s as the musical architect for New York–based band Candy Butchers, releasing three critically acclaimed albums with RPM/Sony Records before focusing on music production.

== Soundtrack work ==
Viola, along with friend Adam Schlesinger of Fountains of Wayne, co-produced the title track for Tom Hanks's 1996 movie That Thing You Do! The selection received an Oscar nomination for Best Original Song. Viola sang lead on the track, and as the accepted singing voice of Johnathon Schaech's character, Jimmy, also sang on other tracks in the film, such as "Little Wild One" and "All My Only Dreams."

For the 2007 Jake Kasdan/Judd Apatow film, Walk Hard: The Dewey Cox Story, Viola wrote or co-wrote "A Life Without You (Is No Life at All)", "Darling", "(I Hate You) Big Daddy", "Dear Mr. President", "Beautiful Ride", "Sir Ringe The Marshmallow Elephant", and "Let Me Hold You Little Man". Viola served as musical director on a promotional tour for the film in December 2007, with John C. Reilly acting out his fictional character of Dewey Cox.

Viola also contributed songwriting for Russell Brand's character Aldous Snow in the 2010 film Get Him to the Greek, including "African Child", "The Clap", "I Am Jesus", "Searching For a Father in America", "Little Bird", "Furry Walls". In 2012, he played the character of Franky in two promotional songs for the video game Club Penguin, "Anchors Aweigh" and "Ghosts Just Wanna Dance".

== Discography ==
=== Solo work ===
Year	Artist	Album	Role
1996	Candy Butchers	Live at La Bonboniere (EP)	Producer, songwriter, musician
1999	Mike Viola and the Candy Butchers	Let's Get Serious (EP)	Producer, songwriter, musician
1999	Mike Viola and the Candy Butchers	Let's Get Christmas (EP)	Producer, songwriter, musician
1999	Candy Butchers	Falling into Place	Producer, songwriter, musician
2001	Mike Viola	Temple of Static	Producer, songwriter, musician
2002	Candy Butchers	Play with Your Head	Producer, songwriter, musician
2004	Candy Butchers	Hang On Mike	Producer, songwriter, musician
2005	Mike Viola	Just Before Dark	Producer, songwriter, musician
2006	Candy Butchers	Making up time (Candy Butchers 1994 – 1996)	Producer, songwriter, musician
2007	Mike Viola	Lurch	Producer, songwriter, musician
2010	Mike Viola & Kelly Jones	Melon	Producer, songwriter, musician
2011	Mike Viola	Electro De Perfecto"	Producer, songwriter, musician
2011	Mike Viola	2011 Primer (Collection)	Producer, songwriter, musician
2012	Mike Viola	Acousto De Perfecto	Producer, songwriter, musician
2013	Mike Viola	Ghoul	Producer, songwriter, musician
2015	Mike Viola	Stairway to Paradise (EP)	Songwriter, musician
2018	Mike Viola	The American Egypt	Producer, songwriter, musician, engineer
2018	Mike Viola	Here We Go, It's Christmas Time (EP)	Producer, songwriter, musician, engineer
2018	Mike Viola	Bitten and Cursed (EP)	Producer, songwriter, musician, engineer
2020	Mike Viola	Godmuffin	Producer, songwriter, musician, engineer
2023	Mike Viola	Paul McCarthy	Producer, songwriter, musician, engineer
2024	Mike Viola	Rock Of Boston	Producer, songwriter, musician, engineer

=== Production and writing credits ===
Year	Artist	Album	Song	Role
2026	Vulfmon	Dott	"Mellotron"	Musician, singer, songwriter, engineer
2026	Noam Weinstein	Male Model	—N/a	Co-producer, musician
2025	Vulfmon	Deg	"Dawn"	Co-producer, engineer
2025	Trapper Schoepp	Osborne	—N/a	Producer, musician
2025	Drumming Bird	Roadkill Poetry	—N/a	Producer, musician, singer
2024	Dawes	Oh Brother	—N/a	Producer, engineer
2024	Madison Cunningham, Andrew Bird	Cunningham Bird	—N/a	Producer, musician
2024	Vulfmon	Dot	"Little Thunder"	Co-producer, musician, engineer
2022	Panic! at the Disco	Viva Las Vengeance	—N/a	Producer, musician, singer, songwriter
2022	Vulfmon	Here We Go Jack	"Let's Go! Let's Go!"	Singer, songwriter
2022	J.S. Ondara	Tax Code 1: Telepathy Of a Mammoth	—N/a	Producer
2022	Andrew Bird	Inside Problems	—N/a	Producer, musician, singer
2022	Mandy Moore	In Real Life	—N/a	Producer, musician, singer, writer
2022	Noam Weinstein	Undivorceable	—N/a	Producer, musician, singer
2021	Andrew Bird, Jimbo Mathus	These 13	—N/a	Producer, musician, singer
2021	Andrew Bird	Hark!	"Greenwine"	Producer
2021	Semisonic	You're Not Alone	"Basement Tapes"	Songwriter
2021	Allie Crow Buckley	Moonlit and Devious	—N/a	Producer, songwriter, musician
2020	Mandy Moore	Silver Landings	—N/a	Producer, songwriter, musician
2020	Watkins Family Hour	Brother Sister	—N/a	Producer, songwriter, musician
2019	Mandy Moore	—N/a	"When I Wasn't Watching"	Producer, songwriter, musician, engineer
2019	Andrew Bird	My Finest Work Yet	"Archipelago"	Musician
2019	Johnathan Rice	The Long Game	—N/a	Producer, musician
2019	Allie Crow Buckley	So Romantic	—N/a	Producer, songwriter, musician
2018	J.S. Ondara	Tales Of America	—N/a	Producer, musician, engineer
2018	Van William	Countries	"Before I Found You", "The Country", "You'll Be On My Mind"	Songwriter
2018	Vulfpeck	Hill Climber	"For Survival"	Singer, songwriter
2017	Dan Wilson	Re-Covered	—N/a	Producer, musician, singer
2017	Shania Twain	Now (Deluxe)	"Life's About To Get Good"	Musician
2017	Ryan Adams	Prisoner	"Prisoner", "Do You Still Love Me"	Songwriter, musician
2017	WATERS	Something More!	"Molly is a Babe," "Something More," "Modern Dilemma"	Producer, songwriter, musician
2016	Panic! at the Disco	Death of a Bachelor	"Victorious"	Songwriter
2016	LOLO	In Loving Memory of When I Gave a Shit"	"No Time For Lonely"	Songwriter
2016	MAX	Hell's Kitchen Angel	"Hell's Kitchen Angel," "Mug Shot (ft. Sirah)"	Songwriter
2016	The Monkees	Good Times!	—N/a	Musician
2016	Teddy Thompson, Kelly Jones	Little Windows	—N/a	Producer, musician
2015	Matt Nathanson	Show Me Your Fangs	"Gold in the Summertime", "Show Me Your Fangs"	Songwriter
2015	Butch Walker	Afraid of Ghosts	—N/a	Musician
2015	New Politics	Vikings	"Pretend We're in a Movie"	Songwriter
2015	Andrew McMahon	Andrew McMahon in the Wilderness	"High Dive," "Black & White Movies," "Driving Through A Dream," "Halls" "Rainy Girl," "Maps for the Getaway," "Lottery Ticket," "Art School Girlfriend," "Cecilia and the Satellite"	Producer, songwriter, engineer
2015	Ryan Adams	Vampires (Paxam Singles Series Volume 3) (EP)	"Magic Flag"	Songwriter, musician
2014	Ryan Adams	Ryan Adams	—N/a	Producer, musician
2014	Matt Nathanson	The Last of the Great Pretenders	"Earthquake Weather," "Mission Bells," "Kinks Shirt," "Sky High Honey," "Kill The Lights," "Heart Starts"	Producer, songwriter, musician, engineer
2014	Jenny Lewis	The Voyager	—N/a	Producer, musician
2014	Brett Dennen	Smoke and Mirrors	"Out of My Head"	Songwriter
2014	Jill Sobule	Dottie's Charms	—N/a	Producer, songwriter, musician
2013	New Politics	A Bad Girl in Harlem	"Harlem"	Songwriter
2013	Fall Out Boy	Pax Am Days	—N/a	Producer
2013	Lori McKenna	—N/a	"Love Can Put It Back Together"	Songwriter
2012	Karise Eden	My Journey	"You Won't Let Me"	Songwriter
2012	Rachael Yamagata	Heavyweight (EP)	"Heavyweight"	Songwriter, musician
2012	Noam Weinstein	Clocked	—N/a	Producer, musician
2011	Will Dailey and the Rivals	Will Dailey and the Rivals	"Best Friend"	Songwriter
2011	Rachael Yamagata	Chesapeake	"You Won't Let Me," "Dealbreaker," "I Don't Want to Be Your Mother"	Songwriter, musician
2011	Rachael Yamagata	Muppets: The Green Album	"I'm Going to Go Back There Someday"	Producer, musician
2011	Gin Wigmore	Gravel and Wine	"Dirty Love"	Songwriter
2010	Jeremy Fisher	Flood	"All We Want is Love"	Producer, songwriter, musician
2010	Infant Sorrow	Get Him to the Greek	"Furry Walls", "The Clap", "I Am Jesus", "African Child (Trapped in Me)", "Little Bird", "Searching For a Father"	Songwriter, musician
2009	Mandy Moore	Amanda Leigh	—N/a	Producer, songwriter, musician
2009	John Wesley Harding	Who Was Changed and Who Was Dead	"Love Or Nothing," "Sick Organism," "Congratulations (On Your Hallucinations)"	Songwriter, musician
2008	Tim Christensen	Superior	"Superior"	Songwriter
2007	Dewey Cox	Walk Hard: The Dewey Cox Story	"A Life Without You (Is No Life at All)", "Beautiful Ride", "Dear Mr. President", "Mulatto Song", "Let Me Hold You Little Man", "I Hate You (Big Daddy)", "Darling", "Hole in My Pants", "Who Wants To Party", "Weeping on the Inside"	Songwriter
2006	L.E.O.	Alpacas Orgling	"Distracted", "Make Me"	Songwriter, musician
2004	The Figgs	Palais	—N/a	Musician
2003	Rasputina	The Lost and Found	—N/a	Producer, musician
2002	The Figgs	Slow Charm	—N/a	Musician
1998	Rasputina	How We Quit The Forest	"The Olde HeadBoard"	Musician
1996	Mono Puff	Unsupervised	—N/a	Musician
1996	The Wonders	That Thing You Do!	"That Thing You Do"	Producer, musician
