= Pete Donnelly (musician) =

American musician

Pete Donnelly (born October 11, 1972) is an American bass player, singer, songwriter and founding member of The Figgs. Born in Saratoga Springs, New York, Donnelly is based in Philadelphia. In November 2007 Donnelly began playing with keyboardist Terry Adams, a founder of NRBQ, in the Terry Adams Rock & Roll Quartet. Adams rechristened the band NRBQ in March 2011. Donnelly played in the group until September 2012. Donnelly has also worked with Soul Asylum, Tommy Stinson, Mike Viola and the Candy Butchers and others. In 2015, Grammy Winning artist Shelby Lynne released her album, I Can't Imagine, the title track was co-written by Donnelly.

Donnelly released his first solo album Another Day On You in 1999, reissued in 2016 as an expanded edition. He released his second solo album When You Come Home, in December 2011 featuring guest appearances from Britta Phillips, Dave Pirner and Tommy Ardolino. His third solo album, Face the Bird, which features his son on one track, was released in 2013. His latest releases and more information can be found on Pete Donnelly Music.
