= The Jayhawks discography =

- Studio albums: 11
- EPs: 1
- Live albums: 3
- Compilation albums: 1
- Singles: 12

This is the discography of the American band The Jayhawks. It lists their original singles, LPs, and compilations. It also includes band member's solo albums.

== Studio albums ==
Year	Album	Peak chart positions				Label
Year	Album	US	US Heat	US Folk	UK	Label
1986	The Jayhawks					Bunkhouse
1989	Blue Earth					Twin/Tone
1992	Hollywood Town Hall	192	11			American
1995	Tomorrow the Green Grass	92			41	American
1997	Sound of Lies	112			61	American
2000	Smile	129			60	American
2003	Rainy Day Music	51			70	American
2011	Mockingbird Time	38		2	92	Rounder
2016	Paging Mr. Proust	75			51	Thirty Tigers
2018	Back Roads and Abandoned Motels					Legacy Recordings
2020	XOXO					SHAM/Thirty Tigers
2026	Sanctuary Park					SHAM/Thirty Tigers

== Compilations ==
Year	Album details
2009	Music From The North Country - The Jayhawks Anthology

== Live albums ==
Year	Album	Details
2002	Live From The Women's Club	Official live bootleg CD of 4-26-02 concert in Minneapolis, MN + studio rarities
2005	Live From The Women's Club Volume 2	Official live bootleg CD of 4-26-02 concert in Minneapolis, MN + studio rarities
2015	Live at the Belly Up	Digital-only release of 1-11-15 concert in Solana Beach, CA

== Singles ==
Year	Title	Peak chart positions							Album
Year	Title	US Main	US Mod	US AAA	US AC	AUS	CAN	UK	Album
1992	"Take Me with You (When You Go)"	—	—	—	—	—	—	—	Hollywood Town Hall
1992	"Waiting for the Sun"	20	29	—	—	150	—	—	Hollywood Town Hall
1993	"Settled Down Like Rain"	—	—	—	—	—	—	—	Hollywood Town Hall
1995	"I'd Run Away"	—	—	—	—	—	—	—	Tomorrow the Green Grass
1995	"Blue"	—	—	—	—	49	33	83	Tomorrow the Green Grass
1995	"Bad Time"	—	—	—	—	—	—	70	Tomorrow the Green Grass
1997	"Big Star"	—	—	—	—	—	—	162	Sound of Lies
2000	"I'm Gonna Make You Love Me"	—	—	5	40	—	—	163	Smile
2000	"Somewhere in Ohio"	—	—	—	35	—	—	—	Smile
2003	"Save It for a Rainy Day"	—	—	10	—	—	—	—	Rainy Day Music
2003	"Tailspin"	—	—	—	17	—	—	—	Rainy Day Music
2011	"She Walks in So Many Ways"	—	—	15	—	—	—	—	Mockingbird Time
2016	"Quiet Corners & Empty Spaces"	—	—	26	—	—	—	—	Paging Mr. Proust
2018	"Everybody Knows"	—	—	—	—	—	—	—	Back Roads and Abandoned Motels
2020	"This Forgotten Town"	—	—	39	—	—	—	—	XOXO

== Other appearances ==
Year	Song	Album	Notes
1986	"Jesus in the Drivers Seat"	Big Hits of Mid-America, Volume IV	
1993	"Lights"	Sweet Relief - A Benefit for Victoria Williams	Victoria Williams cover
1996	"Waiting for the Sun"	ONXRT: Live from the Archives Volume 3	Recorded at The Vic Theatre, Chicago, 7/15/1995
2003	"Fools On Parade"	Lost Highway: Lost & Found Volume 1	
2006	"This Little Light of Mine"	Down By The Riverside	Benefit compilation

== Solo releases ==
=== Gary Louris solo ===
- Vagabonds (2008)
- Acoustic Vagabonds (2008)

=== Mark Olson solo ===
- The Salvation Blues (2007)
- Many Colored Kite (2010)
- Good-bye Lizelle (2014)

=== Mark Olson & Gary Louris ===
- Ready for the Flood (2009)

=== Tim O'Reagan solo ===
- Topeka Oratorio (2002) (with The Leatherwoods)
- Tim O'Reagan (2006)

=== Marc Perlman solo ===
- 25:32:47 EP (2009) (with Janey Winterbauer)

=== Kraig Johnson solo ===
- Kraig Jarret Johnson (2004)
