= Mockingbird Time =

Studio album by The Jayhawks
- Released: September 20, 2011
- Recorded: November 5–December 4, 2010 at The Terrarium Recording Studios, Minneapolis, MN
- Genre: Rock
- Label: Rounder/UMGD
- Producer: Gary Louris

The Jayhawks chronology
Music from the North Country – The Jayhawks Anthology (2009)	Mockingbird Time (2011)	Live at The Belly Up (2015)

Mockingbird Time is the eighth studio album by the alt country band The Jayhawks, released on September 20, 2011. The album marked the returns of the original front man Mark Olson, who had left the group in 1995 after the release of Tomorrow the Green Grass, and long-time keyboard player Karen Grotberg. Mockingbird Time was the first new studio album by The Jayhawks since 2003's Rainy Day Music. The album entered the Billboard 200 album chart at No. 38, becoming the highest-charting release of their career to date. It also charted at No. 2 on Billboard's Folk Albums chart, No. 6 on the Tastemaker Albums chart, and No. 11 on the Rock Albums chart.

== History ==
In late 1995, founding member Mark Olson abruptly left The Jayhawks, in order to spend more time with wife Victoria Williams. With Gary Louris assuming principal singing and songwriting responsibilities, the band released three further albums—Sound of Lies in 1997, Smile in 1999, and Rainy Day Music in 2003—before recessing indefinitely.

Louris and Olson first began speaking to each other again in 2001, when they were requested to pen a track for the 2002 film The Rookie. In the group's time off, the two reunited as an acoustic duo, touring, writing, and recording together sporadically from 2005 to 2009. They released the acoustic album Ready for the Flood in 2009. According to Louris, the two were billed as "'Mark and Gary from the Jayhawks,' and people would always ask us, 'When is the band getting back together?'" The two revived the Tomorrow the Green Grass-lineup of The Jayhawks, consisting of original bassist Marc Perlman, drummer Tim O'Reagan, and keyboardist Karen Grotberg, for two festival dates in Spain. According to O'Reagan, playing together again for the first time in 14 years "was like riding a bike for all of us." Afterwards the band began touring again.

Both Olson and Louris later said that recording the album was a negative experience and Olson left the band once again after the tour promoting the album. Olson complained about money and the songwriting credits on the album and Louris called it "a fiasco [that] left a bad taste in my mouth."

== Recording ==
As the group's activity began increasing, Louris claimed he and Olson felt there was "some business left undone." The members decided to record a new studio album, which Olson described as "a natural thing" to do. Louris and Olson penned the songs for Mockingbird Time in Louris' apartment in Minneapolis, Minnesota, Olson's residence in Joshua Tree, California, and Olson's sister's cabin in the woods of northern Minnesota.

The album was recorded at Terrarium Studios in Minneapolis with Gary Louris assuming role of producer.

== Reception ==
Professional ratings
Aggregate scores
Source	Rating
Metacritic	70/100
Review scores
Source	Rating
Allmusic	4/5 stars
Rolling Stone	3.5/5 stars
Spin	7/10 stars

In his review for Allmusic, critic Mark Deming praised the album and called it "easily the group's strongest and most cleanly focused album since their 1992 masterpiece Hollywood Town Hall." and "a simple but richly rewarding example of what the Jayhawks do better than anyone, and serves as a potent reminder that they're one of the finest American bands of their time." Spin reviewer Nate Cavalieri wrote, "Ignore the mouth-breathing rock bangers, and Mockingbird is as comfortable as well-worn denim."

== Songs ==
The first single from the album, "She Walks In So Many Ways," was released on July 25, 2011.

== Track listing ==
All tracks are written by Gary Louris and Mark Olson.

No.	Title	Length
1.	"Hide Your Colors"	4:00
2.	"Closer to Your Side"	3:36
3.	"Tiny Arrows"	5:52
4.	"She Walks in so Many Ways"	2:38
5.	"High Water Blues"	5:06
6.	"Mockingbird Time"	5:08
7.	"Stand Out in the Rain"	3:55
8.	"Cinnamon Love"	3:54
9.	"Guilder Annie"	3:41
10.	"Black Eyed Susan"	5:25
11.	"Pouring Rain at Dawn"	3:24
12.	"Hey Mr. Man"	3:45

=== Deluxe Edition ===
Disc One
No.	Title	Length
13.	"Touch the Stars"	3:11
14.	"Darkest Hour"	3:03

Disc Two: DVD
No.	Title	Length
1.	"Mockingbird Time: A Documentary" (DVD)
2.	"'She Walks in So Many Ways': The Ocean Way Rehearsal Sessions" (DVD)
3.	"'Closer to Your Side': The Ocean Way Rehearsal Sessions" (DVD)
4.	"'Tiny Arrows': The Ocean Way Rehearsal Sessions" (DVD)
5.	"'King of Kings': Never-before-seen performance from 1985" (DVD)

iTunes bonus track
No.	Title	Length
1.	"Will I Be Married" (iTunes bonus track)
