= Live at the Belly Up (The Jayhawks album) =

Live album by The Jayhawks
- Released: February 10, 2015
- Recorded: January 11, 2015 at The Belly Up, Solana Beach, CA
- Genre: Rock
- Label: Belly Up Live
- Producer: Belly Up Live

The Jayhawks chronology
Mockingbird Time (2011)	Live at the Belly Up (2015)	Paging Mr. Proust (2016)

Live at the Belly Up is a digital-only live album recorded in January 2015 by The Jayhawks live in Solana Beach, released on February 10, 2015 as an exclusive download from the Belly Up Live website. The album went into wider digital release in April 2015 including a high-resolution audio version.

== Background ==
Live at the Belly Up is a live document of a typical The Jayhawks 2014/2015 live show, recorded professionally by the in-house team at the Belly Up Club in Solana Beach, CA. At 20 songs with a running time of 80 minutes it contains almost the entire January 11, 2015 show. The lineup for this show is the entire 1997 touring lineup of the band with the addition of John Jackson on mandolin. This lineup began playing shows in June 2014 in support of the 2014 reissues of the Sound of Lies (1997), Smile (2000) and Rainy Day Music (2003) albums. The setlist concentrates on songs from those three albums, supplemented by older Jayhawks material, an old country cover that The Jayhawks originally released a studio version of on the b-side to the "Bad Time" single (1995) and two songs from the Golden Smog catalog.

== Track listing ==
All songs by Gary Louris except where noted

1. "The Man Who Loved Life"
2. "Ain't No End" (Marc Perlman, Louris, Mark Olson)
3. "Big Star"
4. "Trouble" (Perlman, Louris)
5. "Angelyne"
6. "Take Me With You (When You Go)" (Olson, Louris)
7. "Looking Forward to Seeing You" (Johnson)
8. "Somewhere in Ohio" (Perlman, Louris, Tim O'Reagan, Bob Ezrin)
9. "Smile"
10. "Tampa to Tulsa" (O'Reagan)
11. "Waiting For the Sun" (Olson, Louris)
12. "Blue" (Olson/Louris)
13. "I'm Down to My Last Cigarette" (Harlan Howard, Billy Walker)
14. "Settled Down Like Rain" (Olson, Louris)
15. "Save It For a Rainy Day"
16. "Tailspin"
17. "I'd Run Away" (Olson, Louris)
18. "Sound of Lies"
19. "All the Right Reasons"
20. "Until You Came Along" (with Trapper Schoepp & The Shades)

== Personnel ==
- Gary Louris – electric guitar, harmonica, vocals
- Marc Perlman – bass, vocals
- Tim O'Reagan – drums, percussion, vocals
- Karen Grotberg – keyboards, vocals
- Kraig Johnson – acoustic & electric guitars, keyboards, vocals
- Jessy Greene - violin, vocals
- John Jackson – mandolin, acoustic guitar
