= Music from the North Country – The Jayhawks Anthology =

Music From The North Country - The Jayhawks Anthology

Compilation album by The Jayhawks
- Released: July 6, 2009
- Genres: Rock, country rock, alternative country
- Label: American/Legacy

The Jayhawks chronology
Rainy Day Music (2003)	Music From The North Country - The Jayhawks Anthology (2009)	Mockingbird Time (2011)

Music From The North Country – The Jayhawks Anthology is a compilation album by The Jayhawks, released in 2009.

An expanded version was also released with a DVD of videos and a disc of demos, b-sides, and out-takes.

== Reception ==
Professional ratings
Review scores
Source	Rating
Allmusic	4/5 stars
Pitchfork Media	(7.4/10)
PopMatters	8/10 stars

Writing for Allmusic, music critic Mark Deming wrote "If you've never had the pleasure of listening to the Jayhawks, this collection is a marvelous place to start, and fans will be reminded of just how much good music this group made, and how well it has stood the test of time." Stephen M. Deusner of Pitchfork Media was less enthusiastic about the release, writing that the compilation "traces their story from their beginnings as a struggling local act to their final chapter as a struggling national act." and "After 'The Man Who Loved Life', Music From the North Country falters and never recovers." PopMatters wrote of the album, "Whether as a single or deluxe edition, it’s clear from the contents of each that the Jayhawks are a more than worthy band for anthologizing."

== Track listing ==
=== Disc one ===
1. "Two Angels" (Mark Olson) – 4:07
2. "Ain't No End" (Olson, Gary Louris, Marc Perlman) – 3:45
3. "Waiting For the Sun" (Olson, Louris) – 4:20
4. "Martin's Song" (Olson) – 2:58
5. "Clouds" (Olson, Louris) – 4:51
6. "Settled Down Like Rain" (Olson, Louris) – 3:01
7. "Blue" (Olson, Louris) – 3:11
8. "I'd Run Away" (Olson, Louris) – 3:33
9. "Over My Shoulder" (Olson, Louris) – 3:29
10. "Miss Williams' Guitar" (Olson, Louris) – 3:08
11. "Trouble" (Louris, Perlman) – 4:50
12. "Big Star" (Louris) – 4:27
13. "The Man Who Loved Life" (Louris) – 5:01
14. "Smile" (Louris) – 3:50
15. "I'm Gonna Make You Love Me" (Louris, Taylor Rhodes) – 3:42
16. "What Led Me to This Town" (Karen Grotberg, Perlman, Louris, Tim O'Reagan) – 4:10
17. "Tailspin" (Louris) – 3:20
18. "All the Right Reasons" (Louris) – 3:26
19. "Save It for a Rainy Day" (Louris) – 3:10
20. "Angelyne" (Louris) – 3:47

=== Disc two ===
1. "Falling Star" [From The Jayhawks (aka The Bunkhouse Album) (1986)]
2. "Old Woman from Red Clay" [1988 Alternate version, Previously unreleased]
3. "That's the Bag I'm In" [KFAI Radio Session- Minneapolis October 1989]
4. "Won't be Coming Home" [1991 Demo, Previously unreleased]
5. "Stone Cold Mess" [Previously unreleased outtake from Hollywood Town Hall session]
6. "Mission On 2nd" [1994 Demo, Previously unreleased]
7. "Lights" [From Sweet Relief: A Benefit For Victoria Williams (1993)]
8. "Darling Today" [Blown Away Soundtrack (1994)/B-Side "Blue" CD Single (1995)]
9. "Break My Mind" [B-Side "Bad Time" CD Single (1995)]
10. "Get the Load Out" [B-Side "Bad Time" European CD Single (1995)]
11. "Poor Little Fish" (Early version) [Previously Unreleased]
12. "Someone Will" [Demo/First released on The Jayhawks: Live From The Women's Club]
13. "Cure for This" [Recorded at Jayhawks Rehearsal Space, June 1999, Previously unreleased]
14. "I Can Make It On My Own" [Demo recorded at Jayhawks Rehearsal Space, 1999, Previously unreleased]
15. "Rotterdam" [Demo recorded at Jayhawks Rehearsal Space, 1999, Previously unreleased]
16. "Follow Me" [Demo recorded at Jayhawks Rehearsal Space, 2001, Previously unreleased]
17. "In the Canyon" [Recorded at Jayhawks Rehearsal Space, 2001, Previously unreleased]
18. "Tailspin" (Early Version) [Demo recorded at Jayhawks Rehearsal Space, 2001, Previously unreleased]
19. "I Think I've had Enough" [Demo recorded at Louris home 2001, Previously unreleased]
20. "Help Me Forget" [Demo recorded at Jayhawks Rehearsal Space, 2001, Previously unreleased]

== DVD ==
1. "Waiting for the Sun"
2. "Take Me With You"
3. "Settled Down Like Rain"
4. "Settled Down Like Rain" (Live)
5. "Take Me With You" (Live)
6. "Blue"
7. "I'd Run Away"
8. "Big Star"
9. "Sound of Lies"
10. "Save It for Rainy Day"

== Bonus tracks ==
=== Best Buy bonus disc ===
1. "Nine Stitches" [live 1990]
2. "Everybody Gets By" [radio session 1993]
3. "Boston Maid" [Rainy Day Music demo]
4. "Faded Memory" [Smile demo]
5. "Desperate Serenade" [Woman's Club version]

=== amazon.com bonus tracks ===
1. "Born A Billionaire" [1999 Demo, Previously unreleased]
2. "Plastic Eyeball" [1998 Demo, Previously unreleased]
3. "I Remain Respectfully" [1998 Demo, Previously unreleased]
4. "Save Me From Myself" [2001 "Rainy Day Music" outtake B-side]
5. "Second Nature" [1999 Demo, Previously unreleased]
