= December's Child =

Studio album by Mark Olson and the Original Harmony Ridge Creekdippers
- Released: 2002
- Recorded: 2002, Black Dog Records, Monticello, Mississippi
- Genre: Alternative country
- Label: Dualtone
- Producer: Mark Olson

Mark Olson and the Original Harmony Ridge Creekdippers chronology
My Own Jo Ellen (2000)	December's Child (2002)	Mystic Theatre (2004)

December's Child is the fifth album from The Original Harmony Ridge Creekdippers released in 2002.

== Reception ==
Professional ratings
Review scores
Source	Rating
Allmusic	4/5 stars

Writing for Allmusic, music critic Steve Kurutz praised the album's "minimalist approach" and wrote "Whether singing about around-the-clock meth labs or newspaper roses sold by the side of the road, he creates fully realized worlds within each song on December's Child. The lo-fi folk vibe of the earlier self-released Creekdippers recordings and 2000's My Own Jo Ellen remains... but the electricity and amplification have been turned up a bit, too—rather than deliberately eschewed as he seemed to prefer after first going relatively solo."

== Track listing ==
All songs by Mark Olson except as noted.

1. "How Can I Send Tonight (There to Tell You)" – 3:46
2. "Still We Have a Friend in You" – 3:52
3. "Alta's Song" – 3:49
4. "Back to the Old Homeplace" – 2:29
5. "December's Child" – 4:21
6. "Nerstrand Woods" – 4:38
7. "Cactus Wren" – 4:41
8. "Climb These Steps (We Will)" – 3:24
9. "How Can This Be" – 3:18
10. "Say You'll be Mine" (Olson, Gary Louris) – 4:01
11. "One Eyed Black Dog Moses" (Olson, Victoria Williams) – 5:59

== Personnel ==
- Mark Olson – vocals, banjo, bass, dulcimer, guitar, piano
- Danny Frankel – drums, percussion
- Don Heffington – drums, background vocals
- Gary Louris – guitar, vocals on "Say You'll be Mine"
- Michael Russell – bass, mandolin, viola, violin, background vocals
- Victoria Williams – banjo, guitar, harmonica, background vocals
- David Wolfenberger – bass, background vocals
- Jon Birdsong – trumpet

== Production notes ==
- Mark Olson – producer
- Charlie McGovern – engineer, mastering, mixing
- Jeffrey Reed – engineer
