= The Salvation Blues =

Studio album by Mark Olson
- Released: June 12, 2007
- Recorded: October 7–9, 2006, Infrasonic Sound, Los Angeles, CA
- Genre: Alternative country
- Length: 36.09
- Label: Hacktone Records
- Producer: Ben Vaughn

Mark Olson chronology
| Political Manifest (2004) | The Salvation Blues (2007) | Ready for the Flood (2008) |

The Salvation Blues is the debut solo album by singer/songwriter Mark Olson, released in 2007.

Olson's 10-year marriage to Victoria Williams had ended in divorce and he subsequently suffered from depression. He wrote the songs for the album while recovering in Cardiff, Wales. He recorded demos in Wales, Norway, Poland and Minnesota as well. Olson and the making of the album were the subject of a half-hour documentary, The Salvation Blues, released by Grain Pictures.

== Reception ==
Professional ratings
Review scores
| Source | Rating |
|---|---|
| AllMusic | 4.5/5 stars |

Writing for AllMusic, music critic Thom Jurek praised the Olson's songwriting and wrote "Ultimately, it comes down to the songs, though. And Mark Olson has them here in spades. with the presentation being so utterly simple, a lot of weight rests not only on the singer, but on the lyrics and melody. And Olson delivers, though the often shining optimism of his offerings has been tempered in places by grief, loss, and the workaday living of everyday life that blends dream and reality as time rushes forward; still he champions humble human nobility in choosing life over death each and every morning... Salvation Blues is stripped down, modern desert country music at its very best."

== Track listing ==
All songs by Mark Olson unless otherwise noted.

1. "My Carol"
2. "Clifton Bridge"
3. "Poor Michael's Boat" (Olson, Louris)
4. "National Express" (Olson, Williams, Russell)
5. "Salvation Blues"
6. "Keith"
7. "Winter Song" (Olson, Williams)
8. "Sandy Denny"
9. "Tears from Above"
10. "Look into the Night"
11. "My One Book Philosophy"

=== European bonus tracks ===
1. "Copper Coin"
2. "Your Time Will Come"

== Personnel ==
- Mark Olson – vocals, acoustic guitar, Wurlitzer on "My One Book Philosophy"
- Tony Gilkyson – electric guitar
- Greg Leisz – pedal steel, dobro, mandolin
- Zac Rae – piano, organ, Wurlitzer, vibes, Chamberlain, Mellotron
- David J. Carpenter – bass
- Danny Fankel – percussion, bongos
- Michele Gazich – violin
- Kevin Jarvis – drums
- Ingunn Ringvold – acoustic guitar
- Cindy Wasserman – harmony vocals
- Gary Louris – harmony vocals

== Production notes ==
- Pete Lyman – engineer
- Kevin Jarvis – engineer
- Alfonso Rodenas – engineer
- Ben Vaughn – producer
- Joe Gastwist – mastering
