= John Jackson (musician) =

Musician and music executive

John Jackson is a musician and record label executive, known for being the guitarist for the Jayhawks. He plays guitar, mandolin and violin.

Before joining the Jayhawks, Jackson had been the senior vice president of A&R at Legacy Recordings where he had co-produced The Jayhawks' “Best Of” album. Jackson spoke to Gary Louris when he was on a solo acoustic tour and asked if he could open for him and began to play with the band. Jackson has described the Jayhawks as "the best American band of the last 30 years." Jackson's connections led to the band getting to work with Ray Davies for their Americana album. Jackson co-produced the band's tenth studio album Back Roads and Abandoned Motels at Flowers Studio in Minneapolis.

Since 2010 Jackson has been the vice president of A&R and Content Development for Sony's Commercial Music group. As part of his work, he oversaw the Elvis Presley back catalog, as well as the catalogs of Bob Dylan and Johnny Cash. He worked on a box set for the 50th anniversary of the 1970 Presley sessions, and he’s supplied the master tapes for Baz Luhrmann's Presley biopic.

== Early life ==
Jackson went to Indiana University where he majored in the history of rock music, creating what IU calls "the world's first bachelor's degree in rock history."
