= The Original Harmony Ridge Creek Dippers =

Studio album by The Original Harmony Ridge Creekdippers
- Released: 1997
- Recorded: 1997
- Genre: Alternative country, folk
- Length: 31:43
- Label: Original Harmony
- Producer: Mark Olson

The Original Harmony Ridge Creekdippers chronology
The Original Harmony Ridge Creek Dippers (1997)	Pacific Coast Rambler (1998)

The Original Harmony Ridge Creek Dippers is the first album by the Original Harmony Ridge Creekdippers, released in 1997.

For his first post-Jayhawks recording, Mark Olson returned to his folk and country roots and with the help of his wife Victoria Williams and multi-instrumentalist Mike "Razz" Russell, self-released The Original Harmony Ridge Creek Dippers.

It was re-issued in 2001 by Koch Records.

== Reception ==
Professional ratings
Review scores
Source	Rating
Allmusic	3/5 stars

Writing for Allmusic, music critic William Ruhlman called the album "a low-key effort that takes a distinctly homemade approach... As commercial releases go, one would have to call it underperformed and under-produced, with the feel of late-night exhaustion and dreamlike expression."

== Track listing ==
All songs by Mark Olson otherwise noted.

1. "Flowering Trees" – 3:13
2. "When School Begins" (Olson, Victoria Williams) – 2:37
3. "Run with the Ponies" – 3:48
4. "Be on My Way Home" – 2:26
5. "She Picks the Violets" – 2:33
6. "Valentine King" – 3:45
7. "Eyes are the Window" – 3:13
8. "Humming Bird" (Olson, Williams) – 3:05
9. "Mr. Parker" – 4:11
10. "Jericho" (Olson, Williams) – 3:02

== Personnel ==
- Mark Olson – guitar, vocals, harmonica
- Victoria Williams – background vocals
- Mike Russell – guitar, mandolin, fiddle
