= Paging Mr. Proust =

Studio album by The Jayhawks
- Released: April 29, 2016
- Recorded: Portland, Oregon
- Genre: Rock
- Length: 45:37
- Label: Thirty Tigers
- Producers: Peter Buck, Tucker Martine, Gary Louris

The Jayhawks chronology
Live at The Belly Up (2015)	Paging Mr. Proust (2016)	Back Roads and Abandoned Motels (2018)

Paging Mr. Proust is the ninth studio album by the alt country band The Jayhawks, released in 2016.

== Background ==
The Jayhawks toured and recorded Mockingbird Time with founding member Mark Olson, who returned in 2011. Olson left again in 2012 and the band continued performing without him. Principal songwriter Gary Louris demoed the songs in his home studio before presenting them to the band. "We worked harder in pre-production than any previous Jayhawks record,” Louris said. Former member Kraig Johnson contributed to the recording, though left before the subsequent tour. The final album line-up of Louris, Johnson, Marc Perlman, Karen Grotberg, and Tim O'Reagan is the same line-up that recorded the Jayhawks album Smile. John Jackson, who played on the album as a session musician on guitar, mandolin and fiddle joined the group for the supporting tour, replacing Johnson.

== Reception ==
Professional ratings
Review scores
Source	Rating
Allmusic	3.5/5 stars
Paste (magazine)	7.1 stars on a 10 point scale
PopMatters	7/10 stars
The Washington Post	(no rating)

In his review for Allmusic, critic Mark Deming wrote the album "finds Louris and his bandmates mixing up their formula, introducing new edges and angles to the group's evocative, lonesome Midwestern sound." and "this album demonstrates that Louris still knows how to make a memorable album as the group's sole leader." Paste called the album ambitious, but "there is a stylistic cohesion to the band’s previous efforts that’s not always evident on this one. Though the songwriting is adventurous and the performances assured and occasionally even inspiring, what results is a collection of good songs comprising an album that is somehow less than the sum of its parts." Jeff Karoub of The Washington Post praised the album, writing the album "finds a band supremely confident of where it’s been, where it is and, one hopes, will be." PopMatters called "Quiet Corners & Empty Spaces" one of the best songs the band had released and wrote the album "is a fitting addition to the band’s legacy and a confident demonstration that they are capable of keeping on for a long time coming."

== Track listing ==
All songs by Gary Louris unless otherwise noted.

1. "Quiet Corners & Empty Spaces" – 3:06
2. "Lost the Summer" (Louris, Tim O'Reagan, Marc Perlman, Karen Grotberg) – 3:31
3. "Lovers of the Sun" – 3:15
4. "Pretty Roses in Your Hair" – 4:20
5. "Leaving the Monsters Behind" (Louris, O'Reagan, Perlman, Grotberg) – 3:47
6. "Isabel's Daughter" – 3:26
7. "Ace" – 5:36
8. "The Devil Is in Her Eyes" – 3:36
9. "Comeback Kids" – 4:00
10. "The Dust of Long-Dead Stars" (Louris, O'Reagan, Perlman, Grotberg) – 3:37
11. "Lies in Black & White" – 3:35
12. "I'll Be Your Key" – 3:48

Bonus Disc (available only to those who pre-ordered through PledgeMusic)

1. "Nine More Days"
2. "Useless Creatures"
3. "Never Letting Go"
4. "Ace" (Extended Version)
5. "Quiet Corners & Empty Spaces" (Home Demo)
6. "Lovers of the Sun" (Home Demo)
7. "Isabel's Daughter" (Home Demo)
8. "Pretty Roses In Your Hair" (Home Demo)
9. "Fear the Spark"

Tracks 1–4 & 9 are Paging Mr. Proust outtakes from the album sessions.

Tracks 5–8 are demo recordings. All instruments and vocals by Gary Louris. Produced by Gary Louris at Pants Optional Studios - Minneapolis, MN

All songs by Gary Louris

The 9 bonus disc tracks were re-released digitally on The Jayhawks Bandcamp in October 2020.

== Personnel ==
- Gary Louris – vocals, guitar, synthesizer
- Marc Perlman – bass
- Tim O'Reagan – drums, percussion, background vocals
- Karen Grotberg – keyboards, background vocals
- Kraig Johnson – guitar

with:

- Peter Buck, John Jackson, Scott McCaughey, Chloe Johnson, Mike Mills

== Production ==
- Peter Buck – producer
- Tucker Martine – producer, engineer, mixing
- Gary Louris – producer
- Eric Olsen – engineer
- Justin Chase – assistant engineer
- Keegan Curry – assistant engineer
- Michael Finn – assistant engineer
- Adam Gonsalves – mastering
- Nathan Golub – graphic design
- Balthazar Korab – photography
- P.D. Larson – photography

== Charts ==
Chart (2016)	Peak position
Belgian Albums (Ultratop Flanders)	37
Dutch Albums (Album Top 100)	53
Norwegian Albums (VG-lista)	33
Swedish Albums (Sverigetopplistan)	47
UK Albums (Official Charts)	51
US Billboard 200	75
