= Live at the Belly Up =

Live at the Belly Up may refer to:

- Live at the Belly Up (The Jayhawks album), 2015
- Live at the Belly Up, a 2018 album by 10,000 Maniacs
