= Vagabonds (Gary Louris album) =

Studio album by Gary Louris
- Released: February 19, 2008
- Recorded: Sage & Sound Studios, Hollywood, CA
- Genre: Rock
- Label: Rykodisc
- Producer: Chris Robinson

Gary Louris chronology
Blood on the Slacks (2007)	Vagabonds (2008)	Acoustic Vagabonds (2008)

Vagabonds is the debut solo album by American singer-songwriter and Jayhawks member Gary Louris, released in 2008.

The album was produced by Chris Robinson, of The Black Crows and producer Thom Monahan known for his work with Vetiver, Jonathan Wilson and Devendra Banhart. The album featured backing vocals from a choir of notable LA musicians credited as 'The Laurel Canyon Family Choir,' it included The Bangles' Susanna Hoffs, Jenny Lewis, Jonathan Wilson, The Chapin Sisters and Chris Robinson.

== Reception ==
Professional ratings
Review scores
Source	Rating
AllMusic	4/5 stars

Writing for AllMusic, critic Mark Deming praised the album, writing "Vagabonds manages to sound grand and organic at once, with the arrangements and production capturing a sense of the wide open spaces of Hollywood Town Hall and Rainy Day Music, especially on the beautifully heart-tugging "She Only Calls Me on Sundays," while also encompassing the more ambitious melodic conceits of Smile and Sound of Lies on tracks like "Black Grass" and "Omaha Nights." ... the result is an album that sounds full-bodied but natural and uncluttered, and gives Louris' fine songs plenty of room to reveal their virtues. Anyone who has followed the Jayhawks' career knows that Gary Louris is a major talent, and Vagabonds demonstrates he's still capable of making remarkable music outside the framework of the band."

== Track listing ==
All songs written by Gary Louris

1. "True Blue" – 5:02
2. "Omaha Nights" – 4:04
3. "To Die a Happy Man – 4:34
4. "She Only Calls Me on Sundays" – 3:19
5. "We'll Get By" – 4:29
6. "Black Grass" – 5:14
7. "I Wanna Get High" – 3:55
8. "Vagabonds" – 5:27
9. "D.C. Blues" – 4:15
10. "Meandering" – 3:18

== amazon.com Bonus Tracks ==
1. "Baby Let Me Take Care of You" – 4:54
2. "Fall Day [Demo]" – 3:35

== iTunes Bonus Tracks ==
1. "Three Too Many" – 2:58
2. "Working Girl [Demo]" – 3:10

== Personnel ==
- Gary Louris – vocals, guitar
- Jonathan Wilson – organ, guitar, banjo, bass, vocals
- Joshua Grange – pedal steel guitar
- Otto Hauser – drums, percussion
- Adam MacDougall – keyboards
- Susanna Hoffs – choir
- Jenny Lewis – choir
- Chris Robinson – choir
- Andy Cabic – choir
- The Chapin Sisters - choir

=== Technical personnel ===
- Chris Robinson– producer
- Thom Monahan – engineer
- Ken Sluiter – assistant engineer
- Jim Scott – mixing
- Kevin Dean – mixing
- Richard Dodd – mastering
- Jeri Heiden – art direction, design
- Darren Ankenman – photography

== Chart positions ==
Year	Chart	Position
2008	Billboard Top Heatseekers	9
2008	Billboard 200	100
2008	Billboard Top Independent Albums	30
