= Tomorrow the Green Grass =

Studio album by the Jayhawks
- Released: February 14, 1995
- Genres: Alternative country, alternative rock
- Length: 46:27
- Label: American
- Producer: George Drakoulias

The Jayhawks chronology
Hollywood Town Hall (1992)	Tomorrow the Green Grass (1995)	Sound of Lies (1997)

Singles from Tomorrow the Green Grass
- 1. "I'd Run Away" Released: 1995; 2. "Blue" Released: 1995; 3. "Bad Time" Released: 1995

Tomorrow the Green Grass is the fourth studio album by American rock band the Jayhawks, released on February 14, 1995. It peaked at number 92 on the Billboard 200 chart.

== Background ==
Tomorrow the Green Grass was the band's first album to feature keyboardist Karen Grotberg as a group member.

"Miss Williams' Guitar" was written as a tribute to Victoria Williams, Olson's wife. He would later leave The Jayhawks and form The Original Harmony Ridge Creekdippers with Williams. The song "Bad Time" is a cover of a Grand Funk Railroad song from All the Girls in the World Beware!!!

The album's title track was used in the closing credits of the 1995 film National Lampoon's Senior Trip, but was not included on the original edition of the album itself.

== Reception ==
Professional ratings
Review scores
Source	Rating
AllMusic	4.5/5 stars
Chicago Tribune	3.5/4 stars
Entertainment Weekly	A−
Los Angeles Times	3.5/4 stars
NME	7/10
Pitchfork	7.1/10
Q	4/5 stars
Rolling Stone	4/5 stars
The Rolling Stone Album Guide	4.5/5 stars
Spin	7/10

Tom Sinclair of Entertainment Weekly praised the album as being "everything a country-rock album should be" and stated that "even those who normally can't stand the genre are likely to be seduced by the plaintive vocal harmonies, pristine melodies, and scrappy-but-lyrical guitar solos". Greg Kot of the Chicago Tribune wrote that the album's "wider-ranging arrangements and instrumentation (strings, violin, keyboards) make the band seem less one-dimensional and studied than before." The NME stated that Mark Olson and Gary Louris' vocal harmonies "attain that upliftingly sad tinge of gospel that was once the heavenly terrain of Gram Parsons and Emmylou Harris", while Q wrote that Olson and Louris "lead their slightly expanded six-piece band through a string of beautifully bracing folk-tinged pop songs stunning in their simplicity". Robert Christgau of The Village Voice gave the album a one-star honorable mention rating, indicating it "a worthy effort consumers attuned to its overriding aesthetic or individual vision may well like", and called the album "always sincere, never wimpy".

In a retrospective review for AllMusic, critic Jason Ankeny wrote that "if Hollywood Town Hall is inarguably the Jayhawks' best album, Tomorrow the Green Grass runs a very close second", noting that the album's "eclectic approach pointed the way to the sound and style of the fine records the Louris-led version of the band would go on to make" following Mark Olson's departure. Stephen M. Deusner of Pitchfork stated that the album showcases "a looser, more experimental tack" but runs "one or two tracks too long, a generous gesture that nevertheless lessens its impact, making it an uneven follow-up to Hollywood Town Hall".

== Track listing ==
All songs written by Mark Olson and Gary Louris except as noted.

1. "Blue" – 3:09
2. "I'd Run Away" – 3:34
3. "Miss Williams' Guitar" – 3:06
4. "Two Hearts" – 3:22
5. "Real Light" – 3:25
6. "Over My Shoulder" – 3:41
7. "Bad Time" (Mark Farner) – 3:27
8. "See Him on the Street" – 3:09
9. "Nothing Left to Borrow" – 3:24
10. "Ann Jane" – 4:00
11. "Pray for Me" – 3:39
12. "Red's Song" (Olson, Louris, Marc Perlman) – 3:58
13. "Ten Little Kids" – 4:33

=== Bonus disc available on some European 1995 versions ===
Released in fall 1995.

1. "I'd Run Away" - 3:23
2. "Blue" - 3:11
3. "Last Cigarette" - 3:24
4. "Break My Mind" - 3:22
5. "Tomorrow the Green Grass" - 3:37
6. "Darling Today" - 2:59
7. "Up Above My Head" - 2:39
8. "Keith & Quentin" - 2:39
9. "Leave No Gold" - 5:44

Tracks 1 & 2 recorded for 2 Meter Session (VARA/NPS Holland)
Tracks 3 & 4 taken from the "Bad Time" single
Tracks 5 & 6 taken from the "Blue" single
Tracks 7 & 8 taken from the "Waiting for the Sun" single
Track 9 taken from the European release of the Hollywood Town Hall CD

== 2011 Legacy Edition track listing ==
All songs written by Mark Olson and Gary Louris except as noted.

Disc 1:

1. "Blue" – 3:09
2. "I'd Run Away" – 3:33
3. "Miss Williams' Guitar" – 3:06
4. "Two Hearts" – 3:22
5. "Real Light" – 3:25
6. "Over My Shoulder" – 3:40
7. "Bad Time" (Mark Farner) – 3:26
8. "See Him on the Street" – 3:09
9. "Nothing Left to Borrow" – 3:24
10. "Ann Jane" – 4:00
11. "Pray for Me" – 3:39
12. "Red's Song" (Olson, Louris, Marc Perlman) – 3:58
13. "Ten Little Kids" – 4:33
14. "Tomorrow the Green Grass" (non-album B-side from 1995 single "Blue") – 3:35
15. "You and I (Ba-Ba-Ba)" (previously unreleased) – 4:35
16. "Sweet Hobo Self" (previously unreleased) – 3:08
17. "Last Cigarette" (non-album B-side from 1995 single "Bad Time") – 3:24
18. "Sleep While You Can" (previously unreleased) – 3:51
19. "Blue from Now On" (hidden bonus track; previously unreleased early demo) – 2:47

Disc 2 "The Mystery Demos" (all tracks previously unreleased):

1. "Pray for Me" – 3:42
2. "Won't Be Coming Home" – 3:50
3. "No Place" – 4:56
4. "Precious Time" – 3:29
5. "Poor Michael's Boat" – 2:54
6. "Ranch House in Phoenix" – 4:51
7. "Cotton Dress" – 3:14
8. "She Picks the Violets" – 3:58
9. "Bloody Hands" – 3:45
10. "Up Above the River" – 3:47
11. "Over My Shoulder" – 3:33
12. "Blue from Now On" – 3:18
13. "Hold Me Close" – 4:32
14. "Turn Your Pretty Name Around" – 4:01
15. "You and I (Ba-Ba-Ba)" – 5:08
16. "Red's Song" – 4:29
17. "Nothing Left to Borrow" – 4:06
18. "White Shell Road" – 4:07

1–10 are from demos, February 6, 1992
11–18 are from acoustic demos with George Drakoulias, 10-92

== Charts ==
Chart (1995)	Peak position
Canada Top Albums/CDs (RPM)	70
Dutch Albums (Album Top 100)	25
Swedish Albums (Sverigetopplistan)	9
Norwegian Albums (VG-lista)	28
Belgian Albums (Ultratop Flanders)	36
UK Albums (Official Charts)	41
Scottish Albums (Official Charts)	41

== Personnel ==
The Jayhawks

- Mark Olson – vocals, guitar
- Gary Louris – vocals, guitar
- Marc Perlman – bass
- Karen Grotberg – piano, organ, Wurlitzer, background vocals

Additional musicians

- Don Heffington – drums
- Greg Leisz – pedal steel guitar
- Lili Haydn – violin, viola (on "I'd Run Away")
- Tammy Rogers – violin (on "Over My Shoulder")
- Benmont Tench – organ
- George Drakoulias – baritone guitar solo on "Two Hearts"
- Sharleen Spiteri – background vocals (on "Bad Time")
- Victoria Williams – background vocals (on "Ten Little Kids" and "Pray For Me")
- Mike "Razz" Russell – violin (on Mystery Demos 1–10)

Production

- George Drakoulias – producer
- Clif Norrell – engineer
- David Bianco – mixing
- Stephen Marcussen – mastering
- Paul Buckmaster – string arrangement on "Blue"
- Marina Chavez – photography, cover photo
- Linda Cobb – art direction, design
- Tony Glover – liner notes
- Victor Janacua – assistant engineer
- Jamie Seyberth – assistant engineer
- Jeff Sheehan – assistant engineer
