= Political Manifest =

Studio album by Original Harmony Ridge Creekdippers
- Released: June 28, 2004
- Recorded: February 2004, Joshua Tree, CA
- Genre: Alternative country
- Label: Glitterhouse
- Producer: Mark Olson

Mark Olson chronology
Mystic Theatre (2004)	Political Manifest (2004)	The Salvation Blues (2007)

Original Harmony Ridge Creekdippers chronology
Mystic Theatre (2004)	Political Manifest (2004)

Political Manifest is the seventh album by the Original Harmony Ridge Creekdippers, released in 2004. The album reflects singer/songwriter Mark Olson's disgust at the state of the US. It was released on Mercy Recordings in the US.

== Reception ==
Professional ratings
Review scores
Source	Rating
Uncut	3/5 stars

The Uncut magazine gave the album a score of 3 and wrote "[Olson's] disgust at the state of the nation as befits all things Creekdipper is elegantly realised, simmering over a bedrock of soft piano, woody guitars, and some slow, funky blues"

== Track listing ==
All songs Mark Olson except where noted.

1. "Poor GW"
2. "Walk with Them"
3. "Duck Hunting"
4. "Senator Byrd Speech"
5. "Where is My Baby Boy"
6. "George Bush Industriale"
7. "Saw Song"
8. "Portrait of a Sick America"
9. "My Father Knows Foes" (Traditional)
10. "The End of the Highway"
11. "Coming, Coming" (Traditional)

== Personnel ==
- Mark Olson – vocals, piano, dulcimer, bass, flute
- Victoria Williams – vocals, electric guitar, tres
- Ray Woods – vocals, drums
- Don Heffington – vocals, bass harmonica, saw
- Tom Freund – bass, organ
- Greg Leisz – dobro

== Production notes ==
- Mark Olson – producer, engineer
- David Vaught – mixing
- Bob Stone – mastering
