= Original Harmony Ridge Creekdippers =

- Origin: Joshua Tree, California, U.S.
- Genres: Alternative country, Americana
- Years active: 1995–2006
- Labels: Koch, Atlantic, HighTone, Dualtone, Glitterhouse
- Past members: Mark Olson; Victoria Williams; Mike "Razz" Russell; Don Heffington; John Convertino; Joshua Grange; David Wolfenberger; Greg Leisz; Danny Frankel; Jon Birdsong; Gary Louris; Ray Woods

The Original Harmony Ridge Creekdippers were an Americana group formed by songwriter Mark Olson and his wife, Victoria Williams, after Olson left his previous band, the Jayhawks. The group has also been called The Rolling Creekdippers as well as just The Creekdippers.

For their first three albums, the band consisted mostly of Olson, Williams and multi-instrumentalist Mike "Razz" Russell, with drummers Don Heffington and John Convertino. These were all recorded at the couple's home in Joshua Tree, California, and were distributed by mail order, with little touring to support them.

In 2000, the group picked up touring multi-instrumentalists Joshua Grange and David Wolfenberger as well as long-time Creekdipper "Razz" Russell, dropped "Original Harmony Ridge" from the name and began a two-continent touring schedule in support of three full-band recordings: My Own Jo Ellen, December's Child and Mystic Theatre, which featured the touring quintet along with Greg Leisz, Danny Frankel, Don Heffington, and Jon Birdsong. December's Child included a duet by Olson and former Jayhawks bandmate Gary Louris.

Olson and the Creekdippers have toured in several different combinations without Williams, Grange and Wolfenberger but with drummer Ray Woods and Russell. In 2004 Olson and Louris reunited for a tour with Woods and Russell.

The Creekdippers issued their final recording in 2004. Olson and Williams divorced in 2006, which also led to the dissolution of their musical partnership.

== Discography ==
=== Albums ===
- The Original Harmony Ridge Creek Dippers (1997)
- Pacific Coast Rambler (1998)
- Zola and the Tulip Tree (1999)
- My Own Jo Ellen (2000)
- December's Child (2002)
- Mystic Theatre (2004)
- Political Manifest (2004)

=== Other contributions ===
- "In My Hour of Darkness" on Return of the Grievous Angel: A Tribute to Gram Parsons (1999)
