= Pacific Coast Rambler =

Studio album by The Original Harmony Ridge Creekdippers
- Released: 1998
- Recorded: 1998, Joshua Tree, California
- Genre: Alternative country, folk
- Length: 27:59
- Label: Creek Dippers
- Producer: Mark Olson

The Original Harmony Ridge Creekdippers chronology
The Original Harmony Ridge Creek Dippers (1997)	Pacific Coast Rambler (1998)	Zola and the Tulip Tree (1999)

Pacific Coast Rambler is the second album by the Original Harmony Ridge Creekdippers, released in 1998. As with their first release, it is a home-made recording with the focus on Mark Olson.

Pacific Coast Rambler was re-released in 2001 by Koch Records.

== Reception ==
Professional ratings
Review scores
Source	Rating
Allmusic	4/5 stars

Writing for Allmusic, music critic Brian Beatty wrote of the album; "This is intimate music that recalls old-time traditions and manages to avoid the cloying earnestness that often afflicts folkies and unplugged rockers."

== Track listing ==
1. "Give My Heart To You" (Mark Olson) – 3:00
2. "Kai's Bristlecone Waltz" (Mike Russell) – 2:50
3. "Pacific Coast Rambler" (Mabel Allbright, Olson, Tennessee Williams) – 3:50
4. "Owen's Valley Day" (Olson) – 2:21
5. "Bellflower" (Olson) – 2:34
6. "Prayer Of The Changing Leaf" (Allbright, Tennessee Williams) – 2:26
7. "Elijah" (Allbright, Marc Ford) – 2:10
8. "Welcome Home Jim" (Olson) – 2:45
9. "Golden Street Locker" (Allbright, Olson) – 3:15
10. "Call The Light" (Olson) – 2:48

== Personnel ==
- Mark Olson – vocals, guitar, dulcimer, banjo, conga
- Victoria Williams (credited as "Mabel Allbright") – background vocals
- Mike Russell – organ, bass, fiddle, harmonica, accordion, bongos, viola, vocals
- Marc Ford – lead and rhythm guitars

== Production notes ==
- Mark Olson – producer
- Joe Gastwirt – mastering
- Tony Mason – photography
