= Acoustic Vagabonds =

EP by Gary Louris
- Released: November 3, 2008
- Genre: Rock, pop
- Label: Rykodisc
- Producer: Chris Robinson

Gary Louris chronology
Vagabonds (2008)	Acoustic Vagabonds (2008)	Ready for the Flood (2008)

Acoustic Vagabonds is an EP by American singer/songwriter and Jayhawks member Gary Louris featuring six acoustic versions of tracks from his debut solo album Vagabonds. It was initially given away in independent record shops with copies of the album but was later released to buy separately on November 3, 2008.

== Reception ==
Professional ratings
Review scores
Source	Rating
Allmusic	3.5/5 stars

Writing for Allmusic, critic Mark Deming compared the songs in the stripped-down format of the EP with Louris' versions from the album Vagabonds writing; "These solo performances don't bring much that's new to these songs, but given how good Louris' songwriting was on Vagabonds, that's no insult; accompanied by a full band, they were compelling stuff, and Louris makes them work nearly as well with just his voice and a six-string."

== Track listing ==
All songs written by Gary Louris

1. "True Blue" – 5:02
2. "Omaha Nights" – 4:04
3. "To Die a Happy Man" – 4:34
4. "She Only Calls Me on Sundays" – 3:19
5. "We'll Get By" – 4:29
6. "Vagabonds" – 5:27

== Personnel ==
- Gary Louris – vocals, guitar, harmonica
