= My Own Jo Ellen =

Studio album by Mark Olson And The Original Harmony Ridge Creekdippers
- Released: October 17, 2000
- Recorded: Mid 2000, Chaparral Bottoms, Joshua Tree, CA
- Genre: Alternative country
- Length: 38:17
- Label: Hightone
- Producer: Everyone There

Mark Olson And The Original Harmony Ridge Creekdippers chronology
Zola and the Tulip Tree (1999)	My Own Jo Ellen (2000)	December's Child (2002)

My Own Jo Ellen is the fourth album by Mark Olson and The Original Harmony Ridge Creekdippers, released in October 17, 2000.

== Reception ==
Professional ratings
Review scores
Source	Rating
Allmusic	4/5 stars
Entertainment Weekly	B+

Writing for Allmusic, music critic Jeff Burger wrote of the album; "...the ten wonderful, self-penned songs here are wholly fresh and original, both musically and lyrically. Every cut sounds like an instant classic; and, like the songs of, say, the Band, they seem timeless, as if they've been around for ages... One of the very best albums of 2000, and one destined to be played for years to come."

== Track listing ==
All songs written by Mark Olson.

1. "Someone to Talk With" – 4:06
2. "Linda Lee" – 4:32
3. "Walking Through Nevada" – 3:15
4. "Meeting in Lone Pine" – 3:56
5. "Diamond Davey" – 3:58
6. "Rainbow of Your Heart" – 4:27
7. "Ben Johnson's Creek" – 2:54
8. "Letter from Africa" – 3:33
9. "My Own Jo Ellen" – 2:56
10. "Rosalee" – 4:40

== Personnel ==
- Mark Olson – vocals, guitar
- Danny Frankel – drums, percussion, bongos
- Don Heffington – drums, harp
- Brian Kane – guitar, clarinet
- Greg Leisz – bass, dobro, mandolin, guitar
- Barrett Martin – vibraphone
- Mike Russell – bass, mandolin, violin
- David Williams – background vocals
- Victoria Williams – background vocals, electric banjo

== Production notes ==
- Produced by Everyone There
- Engineered and Mixed by Michael Dumas
- Mastered by Joe Gastwirt at Oceanview Digital Mastering
