= Good-bye Lizelle =

Studio album by Mark Olson
- Released: September 15, 2014
- Genre: Alternative country
- Length: 36:04
- Label: Glitterhouse
- Producer: Mark Olson

Mark Olson chronology
Many Colored Kite (2010)	Good-bye Lizelle (2014)

Good-bye Lizelle is an album by American singer/songwriter Mark Olson, released in 2014.

The songs were recorded using portable recording equipment while Olson and his wife Ingunn Ringvold traveled in Europe, South Africa and numerous other countries.

== Reception ==
Professional ratings
Review scores
Source	Rating
AllMusic	3/5 stars
PopMatters	6/10 stars
MOJO	4/5 stars
AmericanaUK	8/10 stars

Sylvie Simmons from MOJO named Good-bye Lizelle Americana Album of the Month. "Let's hear it for love. Post-Jayhawks, Mark Olson has not sounded this dreamy and happy since those late-'90s Creekdippers albums. Certainly not on his solo solo albums, the pained if pretty The Salvation Blues and the meditative Many Colored Kite. Now here he is with his best album in ages, beaming on the cover with new love Ingunn Ringvold, the Norwegian singer-musician who guest sang on his previous albums. She's as much part of these proceedings as Williams once was, their voices blending and her harmonium, qanun, bass and djembe complementing his guitar, dulcimer and djembe (there are regular instruments too). Recorded on portable equipment in various global spots, it ranges from drifting, almost English-psych pop - Beatley Poison Oleander; Incredible String Bandy Running Circles, joyous opener Lizelle Djan - to sweet midtempo Jayhawks (All These Games). MOJO rated Good-bye Lizelle on their top 10 Americana albums of 2014.

Charles Pitter of PopMatters wrote that Olson and Ringvold's voices blend well together and the album "has a warm sonic atmosphere and an international flavour." Terry Staunton of Record Collector praised the album and wrote; "The accumulative result is an album of great warmth and intimacy that reveals ever more treasures with each listen."

Ian Fildes from Americana UK gave Good-bye Lizelle 8/10, "a significant, bold and beautiful album".

== Track listing ==
All songs by Mark Olson and Ingunn Ringvold except as noted.

1. "Lizelle Djan" – 3:21
2. "Running Circles" – 4:07
3. "Poison Oleander" (Olson) – 3:53
4. "Heaven's Shelter" (Olson, Øystein Greni) – 3:03
5. "All These Games" (Olson) – 3:00
6. "Cherry Thieves" – 3:23
7. "Which World Is Ours?" (Olson) – 3:03
8. "Long Distance Runner" – 3:26
9. "Say You Are the River" (Olson) – 2:55
10. "Jesse in an Old World" – 3:16
11. "Go-Between Butterfly" – 2:37

== Personnel ==
- Mark Olson – vocals, guitar, djembe, dulcimer
- Ingunn Ringvold – vocals, bass, clavinova, djembe, guitar, qanon, keyboards and harmonium
- Karine Aamboe – piano
- Neal Casal – bass, guitar
- Danny Frankel – drums, percussion
- Armen Stepanian – percussion
- Aaron Sterling – drums
- Øystein Greni – guitar
- Vojtech Havel – cello
- Lewis Keller – bass
- Kirsten Ford – backing vocals
- Solveig Ringvold – backing vocals

== Production notes ==
- Mark Olson – producer
- Jussi Suonikko – mastering
- Kevin Jarvis – engineer
- Jorn Christensen – engineer
- Irik Weisberg – engineer
- Michael Vanis – mixing
