= Zola and the Tulip Tree =

Studio album by Original Harmony Ridge Creekdippers
- Released: 1999
- Genre: Alternative country
- Length: 26:43
- Label: Atlantic
- Producer: Mark Olson

Original Harmony Ridge Creekdippers chronology
Pacific Coast Rambler (1998)	Zola and the Tulip Tree (1999)	My Own Jo Ellen (2000)

Zola and the Tulip Tree is the third album by the Original Harmony Ridge Creekdippers, released in 1999. It was originally released by Atlantic Records and later reissued by Rhino Entertainment.

== Reception ==
Professional ratings
Review scores
Source	Rating
Allmusic	3/5 stars

Writing for Allmusic, music critic Dan Lee wrote of the album; "What's missing in Olson's Creek Dipper releases is variety... These songs are interesting yet feel like they could be improved upon with another exploration"

== Track listing ==
1. "Zola and the Tulip Tree" (Mark Olson) – 2:32
2. "Lorna Doone's Garden" (Olson, Victoria Williams) – 2:43
3. "Skip to My Lou" (Olson) – 2:36
4. "Cedric Harper" (Olson) – 2:13
5. "Every Stick of Furniture" (Olson) – 2:32
6. "Custom Detroit Railroad" (Olson) – 3:24
7. "Onion River Camp" (Mike Russell) – 1:50
8. "The Hours Before Dawn" (Olson, Williams) – 2:20
9. "Into the Yard" (Olson, Williams) – 3:09
10. "Big Old Sign" (Olson, Williams) – 3:24

== Personnel ==
- Mark Olson – guitar, vocals
- John Convertino – accordion, drums
- Jon Cowherd – piano
- Don Heffington – harp, percussion
- Eric Heywood – pedal steel, vocals
- Mike Russell – bass, mandolin, violin

== Production notes ==
- Produced by Mark Olson
- Mastered by Joe Gastwirt
- Photography by Daniel Coston
