= Mystic Theatre (album) =

2004 studio album by Mark Olson and Victoria Williams

Studio album by Mark Olson, Victoria Williams and the Original Harmony Ridge Creekdippers
- Released: April 26, 2004
- Genre: Alternative country
- Label: Glitterhouse
- Producer: Mark Olson, Don Heffington

Mark Olson, Victoria Williams and the Original Harmony Ridge Creekdippers chronology
December's Child (2002)	Mystic Theatre (2004)	Political Manifest (2004)

Mystic Theatre is the sixth album by Mark Olson, Victoria Williams and the Original Harmony Ridge Creekdippers, released in 2004.

== Reception ==
Professional ratings
Review scores
Source	Rating
Uncut	4/5 stars

Uncut magazine gave the album a score of 4 and called it "Their best record since 1999’s Zola And The Tulip Tree; Mark Olson and Victoria Williams’ rustic marriages of rural folk, western swing and bluegrass still bubble with contentment." The magazine praised Williams' composition and called her voice a "helium chirp sounding like something forever teetering on stilts"

== Track listing ==
All songs by Mark Olson except where noted.

1. "No Water No Wood" – 3:35
2. "Standing in the Sun All Day" – 2:49
3. "Betsy Dupree" (Williams) – 3:20
4. "Salome" – 2:27
5. "Grand Army of the Republic" – 3:32
6. "It Don't Bother Me" (Williams) – 3:22
7. "Wood in Broken Hills" – 2:54
8. "Thirty Miles of Petrified Logs" – 3:24
9. "Bath Song" (Williams) – 2:14
10. "Rockslide" – 2:44
11. "Naughty Marrieta" – 2:54
12. "Mockingbird Chase the Crow" – 2:00
13. "Bells of St. Mary" – 3:50

== Personnel ==
- Mark Olson – vocals, guitar, dulcimer, bass, piano, flute, cuatro
- Victoria Williams – vocals, piano, banjo
- Don Heffington – bass harmonica, drums, saw, percussion, jaw harp
- Joshua Grange – pedal steel guitar, bass, guitar, organ
- Danny Frankel – drums, percussion
- Greg Leisz – pedal steel guitar on "Betsy Dupree"
- Ray Woods – drums, backing vocals
- Mike Russell – violin, bass
- Steve Nelson – bass
- Kristin Mooney – backing vocals on "Betsy Dupree"
- Vicki Hill – backing vocals on "Betsy Dupree"
- Phil Tagliere – banjo, guitar
- Sheldon Gomberg – bass
- Brantley Kearns – fiddle

== Production notes ==
- Mark Olson – producer
- Don Heffington – producer
- Joshua Grange – engineer, mixing
- Phil Tagliere – engineer
- Steven Rhodes – mixing
- David Vaught – mixing
- Richard Dodd – mastering
- Charlie McGovern – artwork, design
