= Many Colored Kite =

Studio album by Mark Olson
- Released: July 27, 2010
- Recorded: 2010
- Genre: Alternative country
- Length: 42:43
- Label: Rykodisc
- Producer: Beau Raymond

Mark Olson chronology
Ready for the Flood (2008)	Many Colored Kite (2010)	Good-bye Lizelle (2014)

Many Colored Kite is an album by American singer/songwriter Mark Olson, released in 2010.

== Reception ==
Professional ratings
Review scores
Source	Rating
Allmusic	3.5/5 stars

Writing for Allmusic, music critic Mark Deming called the album; "a deeply introspective set of songs, with a keenly spiritual undertow running through these meditations on love, nature, and humanity. Not as cohesive as The Salvation Blues, Many Colored Kites is still a worthy and brave album that finds Mark Olson continuing to find new ways of sharing what life has taught him through his music."

== Track listing ==
All songs by Mark Olson except as noted.

1. "Little Bird of Freedom" (Mark Olson, Ingunn Ringvold) – 4:11
2. "Morning Dove" – 4:34
3. "Many Colored Kite" – 3:53
4. "Bluebell Song" – 3:38
5. "Beehive" – 3:42
6. "No Time to Live Without Her" – 3:49
7. "Your Life Beside Us" – 4:58
8. "Scholastica" – 3:22
9. "Kingsnake" – 3:05
10. "Wind & Rain" (Olson, Ringvold) – 3:41
11. "More Hours" – 3:50

== Personnel ==
- Mark Olson – vocals, banjo, bass, dulcimer, guitar, piano, Melodica
- Danny Frankel – drums, percussion
- Phil Baker – bass, double bass
- Beau Raymond – glockenspiel, percussion, background vocals
- Vashti Bunyan – harmony vocals, background vocals
- Jolie Holland – harmony vocals, background vocals
- Ingunn Ringvold – djembe, percussion, piano, harmony vocals, background vocals
- Shay Scott – Hammond B3 organ
- Neal Casal – bass, guitar, slide guitar
- Michele Gazich – viola, violin
- Ashia Grzesik – cello

== Production notes ==
- Beau Raymond – producer, engineer, mixing
- Joe Gastwirt – mastering
- Jeremy Sherrer – engineer
- David Gorman – design
- Michele Gazich – string arrangements
