= Mike "Razz" Russell =

Mike "Razz" Russell is an American multi-instrumentalist (fiddle, bass, guitar) and member of the Original Harmony Ridge Creekdippers. He has played fiddle on records for The Jayhawks and Joe Henry.

Russell plays fiddle with Minneapolis-based Americana bands The Union Suits and Calamity & The Owl among others.
