= The Jayhawks (album) =

Studio album by the Jayhawks
- Released: 1986
- Recorded: Minneapolis, MN
- Genre: Alt-country, country rock
- Length: 37:54
- Label: Bunkhouse Records
- Producer: Charlie Pine

The Jayhawks chronology
The Jayhawks (1986)	Blue Earth (1989)

Professional ratings
Review scores
Source	Rating
AllMusic	3.5/5 stars
American Songwriter	4/5
The Encyclopedia of Popular Music	3/5 stars
MusicHound Rock: The Essential Album Guide	3/5 stars
Pitchfork	6/10

The Jayhawks is the debut album by the Jayhawks, released in 1986. It is also known as the Bunkhouse Tapes. The 1986 pressing was limited to 2,000 copies.

== History ==
Out of print for many years, the album was digitally remastered from reel-to-reel and reissued by Lost Highway Records on May 18, 2010. The re-release features an eleven-page booklet designed by Mark Olson.

"Falling Star" is available on Music from the North Country – The Jayhawks Anthology.

== Reception ==
In his review for AllMusic, Mark Deming contrasts the early Jayhawks sound with their later work and noted "though it captures some strong and confident performances from a fine band, it's clear they were still a few years away from finding the sound that would make Blue Earth and Hollywood Town Hall some of the most memorable music to come from the first wave of alt-country." Entertainment Weekly wrote that "the songs sometimes bland out, but Mark Olson and Gary Louris’ vocal harmonies still shine." Trouser Press wrote that "the band stakes out its derivative style with so much spirit that it almost sounds original."

== Track listing ==
All songs by Mark Olson, except 1, 2 and 4 by Gary Louris and Mark Olson.

1. "Falling Star"
2. "Tried and True Love"
3. "Let the Critics Wonder"
4. "Let the Last Night be the Longest (Lonesome Morning)"
5. "Behind Bars"
6. "Cherry Pie"
7. "The Liquor Store Came First"
8. "People in This Place on Every Side"
9. "Misery Tavern"
10. "(I'm Not in) Prison"
11. "King of Kings"
12. "Good Long Time"
13. "Six Pack on the Dashboard"

== Personnel ==
- Mark Olson – vocals, guitar
- Gary Louris – vocals, guitar
- Marc Perlman – bass
- Norm Rogers – drums

Additional musicians

- Cal Hand – pedal steel guitar
- Charlie Pine – piano (on "King of Kings")
- Produced by Charlie Pine
