= Rainy Day Music =

Studio album by the Jayhawks
- Released: April 8, 2003
- Recorded: Sunset Sound (Hollywood, California)
- Genre: Alternative rock, alternative country
- Length: 50:51
- Label: American, Lost Highway
- Producer: Rick Rubin (exec.), Ethan Johns

The Jayhawks chronology
Smile (2000)	Rainy Day Music (2003)	Music from the North Country – The Jayhawks Anthology (2009)

Rainy Day Music is the seventh studio album by American rock band the Jayhawks, released on April 8, 2003. It debuted on the Billboard 200 at number 51, selling 19,000 copies that week.

== History ==
At the time of the recording, The Jayhawks consisted of the trio of Gary Louris and long-time members Marc Perlman and Tim O'Reagan. New guitarist Stephen McCarthy replaced guitarist Kraig Johnson. The initial release included a bonus CD of six songs, including a solo live performance by Louris of "Waiting For the Sun", the lead-off track of the group's 1992 album Hollywood Town Hall, on April 26, 2002 at The Woman's Club, Minneapolis, MN.

Guests on the album included Bernie Leadon, Jakob Dylan and Matthew Sweet.

== Reception ==
Rainy Day Music received generally positive reviews from critics. Dirty Linen described the album as "a low-key effort that features delicate harmonies, recalling California relatives such as Poco and the post-Gram Parsons Burrito Brothers". Uncut called the album "all acoustic guitars, rich jangling melodies and heavenly harmonies" and wrote that Gary Louris "has come up with some of his most memorable compositions." Will Hermes of Entertainment Weekly described it as "folk-rock laced with banjos, accordions, and pedal steel" and "the roots move one suspects fans have wanted for years, its classic rock flavor echoing the Byrds, CSNY, and Poco". Mojo wrote that "their new-found economy makes for some pretty lovely highpoints" and that "Louris is unquestionably a virtuoso, playing his parts with a decorous restraint, and contributing cooing, affectingly human vocals."

In his review for AllMusic, Zac Johnson, noting the return to roots music versus the band's more pop-oriented previous albums, praised the first six songs but felt that "the second half stumbles", concluding that "it's certainly an album that gets better with each listen, so it may yet prove to be worth its weight in acoustic gold." Pitchfork reviewer Andrew Bryant agreed that the first half surpasses the second, stating that the latter songs "simply sound forced, pushing the combination of what constitutes alt-country and folk-rock to its limit of self-parody, and at times irreversibly crossing that line", calling the album "the sound of a dog (or more appropriately a bird) chasing its own tail, content with plugging away at the same formula as long as there's still precedence for satisfying their musical niche."

In 2009, Paste Magazine placed the album #44 on their "The 50 Best Albums of the Decade" list.

Professional ratings
Aggregate scores
Source	Rating
Metacritic	73/100
Review scores
Source	Rating
AllMusic	3/5 stars
American Songwriter	4/5 stars
Entertainment Weekly	B+
The Guardian	4/5 stars
Mojo	3/5 stars
Pitchfork	6.1/10
Rolling Stone	4/5 stars
The Rolling Stone Album Guide	4/5 stars
Spin	B
Uncut	4/5 stars

== Track listing ==
All songs by Gary Louris unless otherwise noted.

1. "Stumbling Through the Dark" (Gary Louris, Matthew Sweet) – 2:26
2. "Tailspin" – 3:19
3. "All the Right Reasons" – 3:25
4. "Save It for a Rainy Day" – 3:08
5. "Eyes of Sarahjane" – 3:48
6. "One Man's Problem" – 4:02
7. "Don't Let the World Get in Your Way" (Tim O'Reagan) – 4:19
8. "Come to the River" – 4:29
9. "Angelyne" – 3:44
10. "Madman" – 4:04
11. "You Look So Young" – 4:03
12. "Tampa to Tulsa" (O'Reagan) – 4:02
13. "Will I See You in Heaven" (Marc Perlman) – 3:39
14. "Stumbling Through the Dark (Reprise)" (Louris, Sweet) – 2:17

The initial CD release of Rainy Day Music included a bonus CD, titled More Rain, which included:

1. "Fools on Parade" – 3:29
2. "Say Your Prayers" (Demo) – 3:35
3. "All the Right Reasons" (Alternate Mix) – 3:30
4. "Caught with a Smile on My Face" (Demo) – 3:49
5. "Tampa to Tulsa" (Alternate Mix) – 4:08
6. "Waiting for the Sun" (Louris, Mark Olson) (Live performance by Gary Louris on April 26, 2002 at The Woman's Club, Minneapolis, MN ) – 4:07

The 2003 2 LP release of Rainy Day Music also included the More Rain tracks.

== 2014 expanded reissue track listing ==
All songs by Gary Louris unless otherwise noted.

1. "Stumbling Through the Dark" (Gary Louris, Matthew Sweet) – 2:26
2. "Tailspin" – 3:19
3. "All the Right Reasons" – 3:25
4. "Save It for a Rainy Day" – 3:08
5. "Eyes of Sarahjane" – 3:48
6. "One Man's Problem" – 4:02
7. "Don't Let the World Get in Your Way" (Tim O'Reagan) – 4:19
8. "Come to the River" – 4:29
9. "Angelyne" – 3:44
10. "Madman" – 4:04
11. "You Look So Young" – 4:03
12. "Tampa to Tulsa" (O'Reagan) – 4:02
13. "Will I See You in Heaven" (Marc Perlman) – 3:39
14. "Stumbling Through the Dark (Reprise)" (Louris, Sweet) – 2:17
15. "Tailspin ("Inbred" version)" - 4:12 (demo - previously unreleased)
16. "Waiting For Salvation" - 4:02 (demo - previously unreleased)
17. "The Book You Wrote" - 3:10 (demo - previously unreleased)
18. "False Eyelashes (Blue-Eyed Soul)" - 3:00 (demo - previously unreleased)
19. "Won't Last Long" - 3:17 (demo - previously unreleased)
20. "In the Canyon" - 3:57 (Live at First Avenue - Minneapolis, MN - 7/29/2001 - previously unreleased)

== Personnel ==
The Jayhawks

- Gary Louris – guitar, harmonica, vocals
- Marc Perlman – bass, mandolin
- Tim O'Reagan – drums, percussion, guitar, conga, vocals
- Stephen McCarthy – pedal steel guitar, banjo, lap steel guitar, vocals

Additional musicians

- Richard Causon – piano, accordion, harmonium, keyboards, Hammond organ
- Ethan Johns – dulcimer, guitar, drums, piano, percussion, harmonium, pump organ, guitar loops
- Bernie Leadon – banjo (on "Tailspin")
- Jakob Dylan – vocals (on "Come to the River")
- Matthew Sweet – vocals (on "Tailspin", "All the Right Reasons", "The Eyes of Sarahjane")
- Chris Stills – vocals, percussion

Production

- Ethan Johns – producer, engineer
- Ed Ackerson – engineer
- Richard Dodd – mastering
- Craig Allen – design
- Martyn Atkins – photography
- Chris Reynolds – assistant engineer
- Rick Rubin – executive producer, art direction
