= Back Roads and Abandoned Motels =

Studio album by The Jayhawks
- Released: July 13, 2018
- Studios: Flowers Studio, Minneapolis, Minnesota
- Genre: Rock
- Label: Legacy Recordings
- Producers: Gary Louris, John Jackson, Ed Ackerson

The Jayhawks chronology
Paging Mr. Proust (2016)	Back Roads and Abandoned Motels (2018)	XOXO (2020)

Back Roads and Abandoned Motels is the tenth studio album by the alt country band the Jayhawks, released on July 13, 2018.

== Background ==
Along with two new songs written by Gary Louris, the album mainly features songs co-written by Louris for previous projects. They include "Come Cryin' to Me" (Natalie Maines' album Mother); "Everybody Knows" and "Bitter End" (Dixie Chicks' album Taking the Long Way); "Gonna Be a Darkness" (Jakob Dylan); "Bird Never Flies" (Ari Hest); "Need You Tonight" (Scott Thomas); "El Dorado" (Carrie Rodriguez); "Backwards Women" (The Wild Feathers) and "Long Time Ago" (Emerson Hart). "These [songs] did not feel like covers," Louris said. "These songs all felt like they were in our wheelhouse."

== Reception ==
Professional ratings
Review scores
Source	Rating
Allmusic	3.5/5 stars
American Songwriter	3.5/5 stars
PopMatters	8/10 stars

In his review for Allmusic, critic Mark Deming wrote of the album: "Despite the shifting outlook of the songwriting, the performances are sturdy and evocative throughout, revealing how well these musicians work with one another as they make the most of the dynamics of this subtle but resonant music." PopMatters called the album "a triumph" and "All of the classic signifiers of a Jayhawks album are here—the sublime harmonies, the folk-rock jangle, the wry takes on relationships, and an eye always tuned to the impermanence of things—but with Karen Grotberg and Tim O'Reagan each taking lead on two of the album's cuts, the band plays with a looser confidence than they've previously captured in the studio."

== Track listing ==
1. "Come Cryin' to Me" (Gary Louris, Natalie Maines, Martie Maguire, Emily Robison) – 3:41
2. "Everybody Knows" (Louris, Maines, Robison, Maguire) – 4:09
3. "Gonna Be a Darkness" (Jakob Dylan, Louris) – 4:58
4. "Bitter End" (Robison, Maines, Louris, Maguire) – 4:16
5. "Backwards Women" (Louris, Joel King, Taylor Burns, Ricky Young) – 3:36
6. "Long Time Ago" (Emerson Hart, Louris) – 3:57
7. "Need You Tonight" (Scott Thomas, Louris, Kristen Hall) – 3:17
8. "El Dorado" (Carrie Rodriguez, Louris, Malcolm Burn, Sandra Jennifer (Sandrine) Daniels) – 4:06
9. "Bird Never Flies" (Ari Hest, Louris) – 3:54
10. "Carry You to Safety" (Louris) – 5:24
11. "Leaving Detroit" (Louris) – 4:12

== Personnel ==
- Gary Louris – vocals, acoustic guitar, electric guitar
- Marc Perlman – bass
- Tim O'Reagan – vocals, drums, percussion
- Karen Grotberg – vocals, piano, keys
- John Jackson – mandolin, violin, guitar

Production

- Gary Louris – producer
- John Jackson – producer
- Ed Ackerson – producer, percussion

== Charts ==
Chart (2018)	Peak position
Belgian Albums (Ultratop Flanders)	91
Dutch Albums (Album Top 100)	100
Scottish Albums (Official Charts)	28
Spanish Albums (PROMUSICAE)	24
Swiss Albums (Schweizer Hitparade)	94
