= Blue Earth (album) =

Studio album by The Jayhawks
- Released: 1989
- Recorded: Minneapolis, MN
- Genres: Alt-country, country rock
- Label: Twin/Tone
- Producers: Jim Rondinelli, Tom Herbers, and the Jayhawks

The Jayhawks chronology
The Jayhawks (1986)	Blue Earth (1989)	Hollywood Town Hall (1992)

Blue Earth is a studio album by American alt country and alt rock band the Jayhawks, released in 1989.

== History ==
After the local release of their debut album The Jayhawks, the band recorded a set of demos in order to attract a major label deal. Singer/guitarist Gary Louris was injured in a car accident and left the band. Their manager was able to interest Twin/Tone Records in releasing the demos. Louris went to the studio to overdub his guitar parts and ended up re-joining the band. The re-mixed demos were released as Blue Earth.

"Martin's Song" and "Two Angels" were later re-recorded on Hollywood Town Hall.

Blue Earth was re-issued on CD on the Rykodisc label in 2003 with three bonus tracks.

== Reception ==
Professional ratings
Review scores
Source	Rating
AllMusic	3/5 stars
Robert Christgau	A−

In his review for AllMusic, critic Jason Ankeny wrote that due to the songs originally being demos, they lack punch, and noted "the songs are simply too primitive to come to life in this setting. Nonetheless, the growth of the band's songwriting skills over their debut is substantial..." Music critic Robert Christgau gave the album an A− rating, noting "Gram Parsons comparisons get you nowhere, but I'm not kidding—this is the obliquely songful followup the Burritos never made."

== Track listing ==
All tracks are written by Mark Olson, except where noted

No.	Title	Writer(s)	Length
1.	"Two Angels"		4:07
2.	"She's Not Alone Anymore"		3:23
3.	"Will I Be Married"		3:53
4.	"Dead End Angel"		3:40
5.	"Commonplace Streets"		5:21
6.	"Ain't No End"	Mark Olson, Gary Louris, Marc Perlman	3:45
7.	"Five Cups of Coffee"	Mark Olson, Gary Louris	3:52
8.	"The Baltimore Sun"	Mark Olson, Gary Louris	3:10
9.	"Red Firecracker"	Mark Olson, Gary Louris	3:08
10.	"Sioux City"		3:11
11.	"I'm Still Dreaming, Now I'm Yours"		3:45
12.	"Martin's Song"		3:31
Total length:			44:46

Bonus tracks on 2003 re-issue
No.	Title	Length
13.	"Fingernail Moon"	3:01
14.	"Two Minute Pop Song"	2:31
15.	"Nightshade"	3:49
Total length:		54:07

== Personnel ==
- Mark Olson – vocals, guitar, harmonica
- Gary Louris – vocals, guitar
- Marc Perlman – electric and acoustic bass
- Thad Spencer – drums

Additional musicians

- Dan Gaarder – lead guitar (on "Ain't No End", "Five Cups of Coffee", "Dead End Angel")
- Charlie Pine – organ (on "Sioux City")
- Norm Rogers – vocals (on "Sioux City")
- Jim Rondinelli – vocals (on "Red Firecracker")

Production'

- Produced by Jim Rondinelli, Tom Herbers and the Jayhawks
