= Ingunn Ringvold =

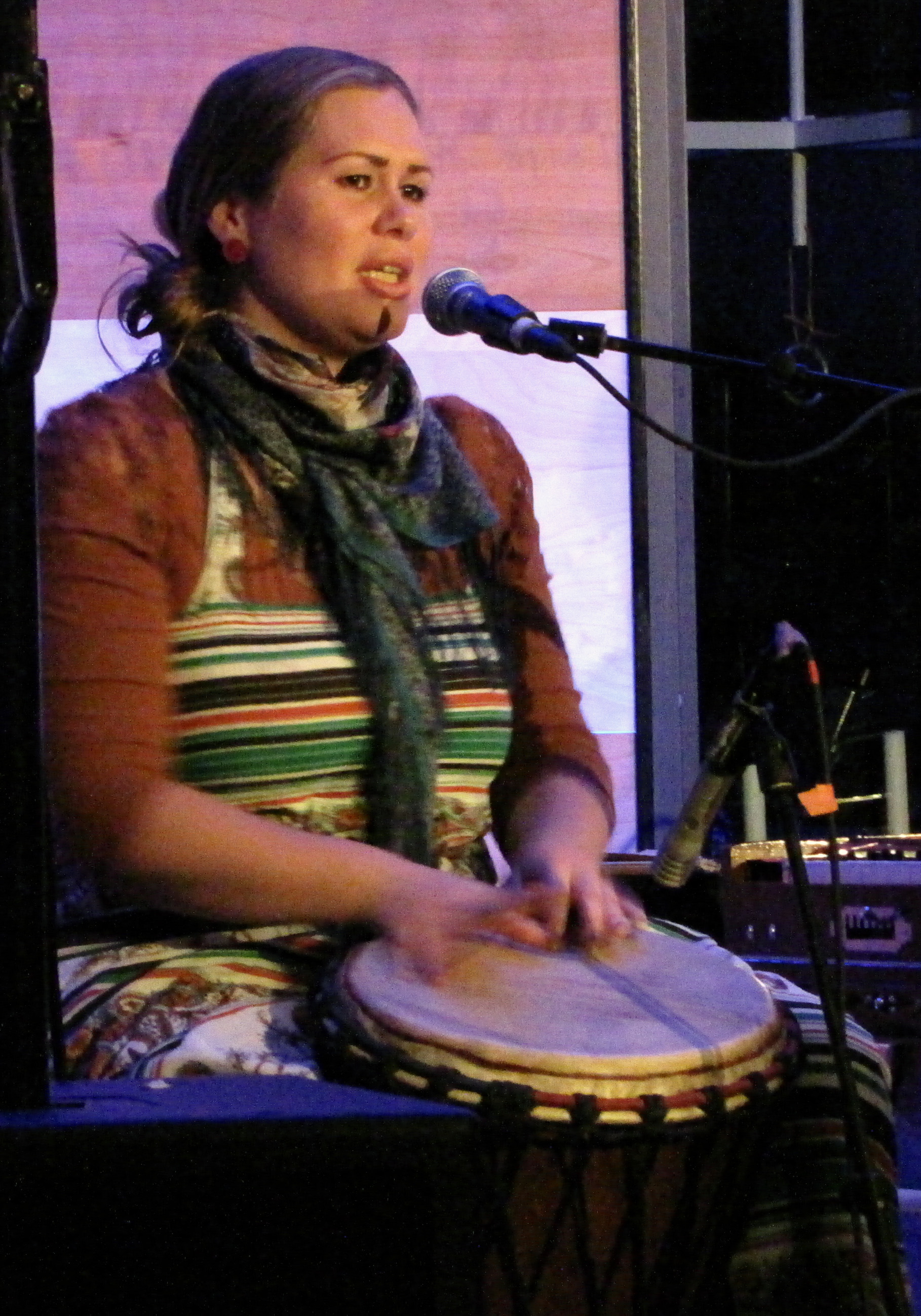

Background information
- Born: 19 October 1979 (age 46)
- Origin: Norway
- Genres: Folk, Roots, alt-country
- Label: Voices of Wonder/VME Coral Ring Records
- Website: www.ingunnringvold.com

Ingunn Ringvold (born 19 October 1979) is a roots singer, musician and songwriter from Norway. She plays piano, harmonium, guitar, dulcimer, djembe and qanon.

== Musical career ==
=== Record deal ===
Ringvold signed with Voices of Wonder in 2008 and within the same year her debut album Girl In Sailor Suit was released. The record was produced by Are Fevang from Ila Auto, recorded in Oslo, Norway and Los Angeles. The single "I Need A Ride" was listed NRK P1, the largest public radio station in Norway.

November 1, 2010 her second album Tea Leaves was released, recorded in Lund (Sweden), Oslo (Norway) and Portland (USA). The album was produced by Mark Olson.

Ingunn Ringvold's third album Drove Long To See Him was released June 2, 2012 on her own record label; Coral Ring Records. The album was produced by Øyvind Storli Hoel.

=== Concerts and touring ===
Ingunn Ringvold has toured and played shows and festivals in Norway, Switzerland and Australia.

== Mark Olson ==
In 2006, Ringvold joined singer/songwriter Mark Olson and toured all over the States, Europe and Australia as part of his group.

She and Mark Olson married and they lived in Joshua Tree in California from where they released their joint album Magdalen Accepts The Invitation in 2020.

== Discography ==
=== Albums ===
- Girl In Sailor Suit, Voices of Wonder, 2008
- Tea Leaves, Voices of Wonder, 2010
- Drove Long To See Him, 2012
- Magdalen Accepts The Invitation, 2020 (with Mark Olsen)

=== Singles ===
- "I Need A Ride", Voices of Wonder, 2008
