= XOXO (The Jayhawks album) =

Studio album by The Jayhawks
- Released: July 10, 2020
- Studios: Pachyderm Recording Studio, Cannon Falls, Minnesota
- Genre: Rock
- Length: 46:26
- Label: Sham/Thirty Tigers
- Producer: The Jayhawks

The Jayhawks chronology
Back Roads and Abandoned Motels (2018)	XOXO (2020)	Sanctuary Park (2026)

Professional ratings
Aggregate scores
Source	Rating
Metacritic	79/100
Review scores
Source	Rating
AllMusic	3.5/5 stars
American Songwriter	3.5/5 stars
Classic Rock	4/5 stars
Mojo	4/5 stars
Pitchfork	7.0/10
PopMatters	8/10
Uncut	4/5 stars

XOXO is the eleventh studio album by the alt country band the Jayhawks, released on July 10, 2020. The album is dedicated to Ed Ackerson.

== Background ==
The Jayhawks recorded XOXO in 2020 with the group line-up of Gary Louris, Marc Perlman, Karen Grotberg, and Tim O'Reagan after John Jackson left as a full time member. John Jackson is credited as on the album as is another former member, Stephen McCarthy. Longtime alt-country mainstay and frequent Jayhawks contributor Eric Heywood adds pedal steel to two tracks and engineer Kris Johnson plays guitar on one. This is the first Jayhawks album with sole writing credits for each member as well as the first to feature each as a lead vocalist.

== Track listing ==
1. "This Forgotten Town" (Gary Louris, Tim O'Reagan, Marc Perlman) – 3:48
2. "Dogtown Days" (O'Reagan) – 3:17
3. "Living in a Bubble" (Louris) – 3:05
4. "Ruby" (Karen Grotberg) – 3:39
5. "Homecoming" (Louris) – 4:06
6. "Society Pages" (O'Reagan) – 4:38
7. "Illuminate" (Louris, O'Reagan, Perlman) – 4:35
8. "Bitter Pill" (Grotberg, Louris, O'Reagan) – 3:25
9. "Across My Field" (Grotberg) – 4:55
10. "Little Victories" (Louris, O'Reagan) – 3:47
11. "Down to the Farm" (Perlman) – 3:28
12. "Looking Up Your Number" (O'Reagan) – 3:43

Bonus tracks (only available on the first pressings of the CD and LP releases)

1. "Jewel of the Trimbelle" (Grotberg) – 3:41
2. "Then You Walked Away" (Louris) – 3:14
3. "Hypocrite's Lament" (Perlman, Louris) – 3:28

== Personnel ==
The Jayhawks

- Karen Grotberg – keyboards, vocals
- Gary Louris – guitars, mellotron, vocals
- Marc Perlman – bass, guitars, harmonica, vocals
- Tim O'Reagan – drums, percussion, guitar, sitar, vocals

Additional musicians

- Stephen McCarthy – electric guitar on "Bitter Pill" and pedal steel on "This Forgotten Town"
- Eric Heywood – pedal steel on "Across My Field" and "Ruby"
- John Jackson – violin on "Across My Field" and mandolin on "Living in a Bubble", "Bitter Pill" and "Down to the Farm"
- Kris Johnson – electric guitar on "Ruby"

Production

- The Jayhawks – producers
- Gary Louris – executive producer
- Paul Q. Kolderie – mixing
- Pete Weiss – mastering
- Nick Veitbakk – engineer
- Kris Johnson – engineer and mixing
- Duncan Hannah – cover painting

== Charts ==
Chart (2020)	Peak position
Belgian Albums (Ultratop Flanders)	149
Dutch Albums (Album Top 100)	58
Swiss Albums (Schweizer Hitparade)	52
US Americana/Folk Albums (Billboard)	13
