= Hollywood Town Hall =

Studio album by The Jayhawks
- Released: September 15, 1992
- Recorded: Hollywood Sound and Pachyderm Studio
- Genres: Alternative country; alternative rock; rock and roll
- Length: 42:36
- Label: American
- Producer: George Drakoulias

The Jayhawks chronology
Blue Earth (1989)	Hollywood Town Hall (1992)	Tomorrow the Green Grass (1995)

Singles from Hollywood Town Hall
- 1. "Take Me with You (When You Go)" Released: 1992; 2. "Waiting for the Sun" Released: 1992; 3. "Settled Down Like Rain" Released: 1993

Hollywood Town Hall is the third studio album by American rock band The Jayhawks. It peaked at number 11 on the Billboard Heatseekers chart and number 192 on the Billboard 200. The cover art for the album was shot in Hollywood Township, Carver County, Minnesota by British photographer Andrew Catlin.

== Music ==
According to Stephen M. Deusner of Paste Magazine: "Their harmonies sound tight but laidback, well-rehearsed but perfectly intuitive, and on their career-maker Hollywood Town Hall, they sound like an old-time country act (think The Louvin Brothers) backed by a heartland rock band (think The Heartbreakers if they were Hoosiers)."

== Reception and legacy ==
Professional ratings
Review scores
Source	Rating
AllMusic	4.5/5 stars
Chicago Tribune	3/4 stars
Entertainment Weekly	A
Los Angeles Times	3.5/4 stars
Mojo	4/5 stars
NME	7/10
Pitchfork	8.3/10
Rolling Stone	4/5 stars
The Rolling Stone Album Guide	5/5 stars
Select	4/5

David Browne of Entertainment Weekly wrote that despite noticeable musical influences from The Everly Brothers, The Rolling Stones, and Neil Young on the album, "there's nothing nostalgic about the passion and desperation in every syllable of singer-songwriter Mark Olson's voice — or in the band's effortless mix of sawdust harmonies and craggy electric guitars." Steve Hochman of the Los Angeles Times stated that Olson and Gary Louris "achieve a yearning ache that would have done top Burrito Gram Parsons proud". Rolling Stone's Chris Mundy hailed Hollywood Town Hall as the band's "definitive statement" and praised Olson and Louris' vocal harmonies. Music critic Robert Christgau was less positive and gave the album a "neither" rating, indicating an album that "may impress once or twice with consistent craft or an arresting track or two. Then it won't."

In a retrospective review for AllMusic, critic Ned Raggett called Hollywood Town Hall "one of the more unlikely major label releases of 1992" and described the album as "accessible enough for should-have-been success but bowing to no trends", concluding that it "sounds more like something made for the group's own satisfaction that connects beyond it as well." Stephen M. Deusner of Pitchfork cited the album as "the Jayhawks' greatest statement."

Stephen M. Deusner of Paste Magazine wrote: "The band formed long before anyone coined the term “alt-country,” but the Jayhawks set the bar for that movement’s songwriting and harmonies, directly influencing the likes of Ryan Adams, Robbie Fulks, and Freakwater. About the best thing that can be said about Hollywood Town Hall, however, is that 20 years later it still doesn’t sound like part of any trend. The Jayhawks sound like a band following their own muse, which made them beloved cult artists but not rock stars."

== Track listing ==
All songs written by Mark Olson and Gary Louris except "Wichita" by Olson, Louris and Marc Perlman.

1. "Waiting for the Sun" – 4:19
2. "Crowded in the Wings" – 4:55
3. "Clouds" – 4:51
4. "Two Angels" – 4:04
5. "Take Me with You (When You Go)" – 4:50
6. "Sister Cry" – 4:08
7. "Settled Down Like Rain" – 3:00
8. "Wichita" – 5:26
9. "Nevada, California" – 4:05
10. "Martin's Song" – 2:58

European CD bonus track

11. "Leave No Gold" – 5:46

2011 expanded reissue track listing

11. "Leave No Gold" – 5:48 (previously commercially unavailable in the U.S.)
12. "Keith and Quentin" – 2:37 (previously commercially unavailable in the U.S.)
13. "Up Above My Head" – 2:36 (previously commercially unavailable in the U.S.)
14. "Warm River" – 3:23 (previously unreleased)
15. "Mother Trust You to Walk to the Store" – 3:53 (previously unreleased)

== Personnel ==
The Jayhawks

- Mark Olson – acoustic guitar, electric guitar, harmonica, vocals
- Marc Perlman – bass
- Ken Callahan – drums
- Gary Louris – electric guitar, fuzz guitar, guitar, vocals

Additional musicians

- Charley Drayton – drums
- Nicky Hopkins – piano on "Two Angels" and "Martin's Song"
- Benmont Tench – piano, organ

Production

- George Drakoulias – producer
- Howie Weinberg – mastering
- Tom Herbers – engineer
- Brian Jenkins – engineer
- Brendan O'Brien – engineer
- Jim Rondinelli – engineer
- Dale Lavi – photographer
- Joe Henry – liner notes
- Martyn Atkins – art direction
