= Smile (The Jayhawks album) =

Studio album by The Jayhawks
- Released: May 9, 2000
- Recorded: Flowers Studio, Minneapolis, MN
- Genre: Alternative rock, alternative country, jangle pop, power pop
- Length: 53:20
- Label: American
- Producer: Bob Ezrin

The Jayhawks chronology
| Sound of Lies (1997) | Smile (2000) | Rainy Day Music (2003) |

Smile is the sixth studio album by American rock band The Jayhawks. Released on May 9, 2000, it reached number 129 on the Billboard 200 and number 14 on Billboard's Top Internet Albums chart.

Smile marks a move away from the band's long-time alt-country stylings to a more pop approach.

== Reception ==
Professional ratings
Review scores
| Source | Rating |
|---|---|
| AllMusic | 3/5 stars |
| American Songwriter | 4/5 stars |
| Entertainment Weekly | B |
| The Guardian | 5/5 stars |
| NME | 6/10 |
| Pitchfork | 7.5/10 |
| Q | 3/5 stars |
| Rolling Stone | 2/5 stars |
| The Rolling Stone Album Guide | 3.5/5 stars |
| The Village Voice | C |

John Duffy of AllMusic noted that "the general shift in direction may alienate a few long-term fans, but much like friends Wilco achieved with their adventurous Summerteeth, Smile's modern touches may bring even more people into the band's orbit", concluding that "what never changes on the Jayhawks' albums, it seems, are the blissful melodies and well-constructed tunes, and that may just be enough for even the toughest critics." Similarly, Ryan Kearney of Pitchfork noted that "If hardcore Mark Olson-era Jayhawks' fans felt betrayed by the dark pop of 1997's Sound of Lies, they'll be downright vigilant after hearing Smile", but that the album, while not as "artistically successful" as Summerteeth, was nonetheless "one of the finer, genuinely happy albums of the year." The Guardian's Tom Cox hailed it as a "brilliant enough record ... written and delivered with the cynicism-free belief that rock'n'roll is still something vital and anthemic to the general public."

In a mixed review, the NME wrote that "as sweet as it often is on the surface, it seems like there's something deeply selfish underpinning The Jayhawks' new approach." The Village Voice's Robert Christgau wrote that the band, without Olson's contributions, were now "as vapid as late Poco and then some" and "aspire to the generalization level of transcendentalist parlor ballads, Hallmark cards, and, increasingly, Music Row."

== Track listing ==
1. "Smile" (Gary Louris) – 3:50
2. "I'm Gonna Make You Love Me" (Louris, Taylor Rhodes) – 3:40
3. "What Led Me to This Town" (Gary Louris, Marc Perlman, Karen Grotberg, Tim O'Reagan) – 4:09
4. "Somewhere in Ohio" (Perlman, Louris, O'Reagan, Bob Ezrin) – 3:39
5. "A Break in the Clouds" (Louris, Perlman, Grotberg, O'Reagan) – 3:59
6. "Queen of the World" (Louris, Ezrin) – 2:35
7. "Life Floats By" (Louris, Perlman) – 4:42
8. "Broken Harpoon" (Louris) – 3:31
9. "Pretty Thing" (Louris, Perlman) – 4:18
10. "Mr. Wilson" (Louris, O'Reagan) – 4:26
11. "(In My) Wildest Dreams" (Louris, Perlman, Ezrin) – 4:30
12. "Better Days" (Louris) – 4:36
13. "Baby, Baby, Baby" (Louris) – 5:19

2014 expanded reissue bonus tracks

14. "Who Made You King" (Louris, Perlman) – 5:42 (studio outtake – previously commercially unavailable)
15. "Gypsy in the Mood" (Louris) – 1:16 (studio outtake)
16. "A Part of You" (Louris, O'Reagan) – 3:14 (demo – previously unreleased)
17. "Life's Little Ups and Downs" (Margaret Ann Rich) – 4:47 (Live at First Avenue, Minneapolis, MN, 12/30/2000 – previously unreleased)
18. "Greta Garbo (Louris) – 3:50 (demo – previously unreleased)
19. "Five Cornered Blues" (Louris, Mark Olson) – 4:00 (demo – previously unreleased)

== Personnel ==
The Jayhawks

- Gary Louris – guitar, vocals
- Karen Grotberg – keyboards, vocals (left the Jayhawks after the album had been recorded, and is credited as a session musician—not a band member—on the finished release)
- Marc Perlman – bass, mandolin, vocals
- Tim O'Reagan – drums, percussion, vocals
- Kraig Johnson – guitar
  - Jen Gunderman is credited and pictured as a member of the Jayhawks, but joined the group after the recording had been completed.

Additional musicians

- Bob Ezrin – synthesizer, percussion, accordion, keyboards, vocals, string arrangements
- Eric Heywood – dobro, pedal steel guitar
- Armadillo String Quartet – strings
- Patrick Seymour – synthesizer

Production

- Bob Ezrin – producer
- Ed Ackerson – programming, engineer
- Leon Zervos – mastering
- Joseph Bishara – programming
- Richard Werbowenko – programming
- Jay Healy – engineer, mixing
- Ok Hee Kim – assistant engineer
- Jonathan Sacks – orchestration, string arrangements
- David Katzenstein – cover photo
- Ken Schles – photography
- Josh Cheuse – art direction
- Andy Wolf – studio technician
