= Ready for the Flood =

Studio album by Mark Olson and Gary Louris
- Released: December 1, 2008
- Recorded: Sage & Sound Studios, Hollywood, CA
- Genre: Alternative country
- Length: 55:02
- Label: New West
- Producer: Chris Robinson

Mark Olson chronology
The Salvation Blues (2007)	Ready for the Flood (2008)	Many Colored Kite (2010)

Gary Louris chronology
Acoustic Vagabonds (2007)	Ready for the Flood (2008)

Ready for the Flood is an album by former Jayhawks bandmates Mark Olson and Gary Louris, released in Europe on December 1, 2008, and in the US on January 29, 2009. It was their first collaboration since Olson had left the band in 1995.

The songwriting and recording sessions for the album resulted from a visit by Louris to Olson's home in California in late 2001. The duo asked Chris Robinson to produce the recording. They briefly toured to support the album.

== Reception ==
Professional ratings
Review scores
Source	Rating
AllMusic	3/5 stars
Paste	(8.3 of 10)

Writing for AllMusic, music critic Mark Deming called the album "...unlikely to disappoint fans of their old band. But while they mine a thoughtful country-folk vein that's not far removed from Jayhawks territory, Olson and Louris take a somewhat softer, more acoustic-based, balladic approach here than they did in the Jayhawks days, lending Ready for the Flood a warm, honeyed glow."

== Track listing ==
All songs by Mark Olson & Gary Louris

1. "Rose Society" – 3:12
2. "Bicycle" – 3:52
3. "Turn Your Pretty Name Around" – 4:51
4. "Saturday Morning on Sunday Street" – 3:53
5. "Kick the Wood" – 4:04
6. "Chamberlain, SD" – 3:42
7. "Black Eyes" – 4:25
8. "Doves And Stones" – 3:22
9. "My Gospel Song for You" – 3:44
10. "When the Wind Comes Up" – 3:39
11. "Bloody Hands" – 3:25
12. "Life's Warm Sheets" – 2:47
13. "Trap's Been Set" – 4:08
  US Bonus Tracks:
14. "Precious Time" – 3:26
15. "Cotton Dress" – 2:58

== Personnel ==
- Mark Olson – vocals, acoustic guitar, Fender Rhodes, Melodeon
- Gary Louris – vocals, acoustic guitar, electric guitar, harmonica
- George Reiff – bass
- Jimi Hey – drums
- Chris Robinson – harmonica, backing vocals
- Jason Yates – Hammond B-3 organ
- Ben Peeler – banjo, dobro

Production notes

- Michael Nieves – executive producer
- David Gorman – executive producer
- Chris Robinson – producer
- Beau Raymond - engineer
- Joe Gastwirst – mastering
