= Sound of Lies =

Studio album by Jayhawks
- Released: April 22, 1997
- Recorded: May 1996
- Studios: Terrarium Studios, Minneapolis
- Genres: Alternative rock, alternative country, jangle pop, power pop
- Length: 55:44
- Label: American
- Producers: Brian Paulson, The Jayhawks

Jayhawks chronology
Tomorrow the Green Grass (1995)	Sound of Lies (1997)	Smile (2000)

Sound of Lies is the fifth studio album by American rock band The Jayhawks. It peaked at number 112 on the Billboard 200. The album marked a stylistic shift from the band's alternative country roots.

== Background ==
The Jayhawks' fourth studio album, Tomorrow the Green Grass released in 1995 to critical praise and feeble commercial success. Despite achieving a minor radio hit in Canada with their single Blue, the album and subsequent tour landed the band nearly $1 million in debt. Burnt out, Jayhawks co-founder Mark Olson decided to part ways with the band to pursue music with his wife Victoria Williams. With Olson gone, songwriting responsibilities and band leadership were left up to Gary Louris. Originally intending to start anew, under the name "Six Green Olives", Louris, bassist Marc Perlman, and keyboardist Karen Grotberg decided to retain the Jayhawks moniker. However, the band was keen to move on from their preestablished alternative country sound.

In 1996, the band was writing material for a fifth album; all the while recruiting Golden Smog and Run Westy Run guitarist Kraig Johnson, multi-instrumentalist Jessy Greene of the Geraldine Fibbers, and drummer Tim O'Reagan, who toured with The Jayhawks the previous summer. Perlman co-wrote "Trouble" and "Dying on the Vine" with Louris, while O'Reagan sang lead vocals on his contribution, "Bottomless Cup".

Olson's departure, Louris' on-going divorce, and record label politics all factoring together led the band to believe Sound of Lies would be their last album.

== Reception ==
Professional ratings
Review scores
Source	Rating
AllMusic	4/5 stars
Entertainment Weekly	B−
The Guardian	5/5 stars
Los Angeles Times	2.5/4 stars
Mojo	4/5 stars
NME	5/10
Q	4/5 stars
Rolling Stone	3.5/5 stars
The Rolling Stone Album Guide	3/5 stars
Spin	4/10

Sara Scribner of the Los Angeles Times felt that Sound of Lies was the work of the band "still reaching to discover what it is" in the wake of Mark Olson's departure, though noting that "despite battling emotions, muddled messages and elusive experimentation, this is still a brave album." David Browne of Entertainment Weekly wrote that while "the music can still have a breathtaking, across-the-great-divide sweep", the album as a whole "is caught between two worlds—it's a little bit wimpy country, a little bit wimpy rock & roll — and ends up lacking the power of either." Robert Christgau of The Village Voice assigned it a "dud" rating, indicating "a bad record whose details rarely merit further thought."

In a retrospective review for AllMusic, critic Thom Owen called Sound of Lies "the band's most ambitious album to date" and felt that Louris' lyrics "have a naked, emotional honesty which would have been more affecting if the music echoed its sentiment, yet the record still has a subtle grace and power, proving that the Jayhawks remain a distinctive band without Olson."

== Track listing ==
All songs written by Gary Louris, unless otherwise noted.

1. "The Man Who Loved Life" – 5:00
2. "Think About It" (Louris, Marc Perlman) – 5:37
3. "Trouble" (Perlman, Louris) – 4:50
4. "It's Up to You" – 3:38
5. "Stick in the Mud" – 3:34
6. "Big Star" – 4:25
7. "Poor Little Fish" – 3:56
8. "Sixteen Down" – 5:23
9. "Haywire" – 5:21
10. "Dying on the Vine" (Louris, Perlman) – 5:52
11. "Bottomless Cup" (Tim O'Reagan) – 4:14
12. "Sound of Lies" – 3:56

European CD bonus track

13. "I Hear You Cry" – 3:48 (Perlman)

2014 expanded reissue bonus tracks

13. "I Hear You Cry" – 3:48 (Perlman)
14. "Sleepyhead" – 3:29 (B-side of "Big Star" single)
15. "Kirby's Tune" – 5:34 (Kraig Johnson, Louris, Perlman, Karen Grotberg, O'Reagan) (studio outtake – previously unreleased)
16. "It's Up to You" – 3:37 (alternate version – previously unreleased)
17. "Sound of Lies" – 4:24 (rough mix – previously unreleased)

== Personnel ==
The Jayhawks

- Gary Louris – guitar, vocals
- Marc Perlman – bass, guitar, vocals
- Karen Grotberg – organ, piano, keyboards, Wurlitzer, vocals
- Tim O'Reagan – drums, vocals
- Kraig Johnson – guitar, E-Bow
- Jessy Greene – violin, viola, cello

Additional musicians

- Matthew Sweet – vocals on "Sixteen Down"
- Pauli Ryan – percussion on "Trouble" and "Dying on the Vine"
- George Drakoulias – Chamberlin on "Dying on the Vine"

Production

- Brian Paulson – producer, mixing
- The Jayhawks - producing
- George Drakoulias – mixing
- Jim Scott – mixing
- Mark Haines – engineer
- Victor Janacua – engineer
- Brian Jenkins – engineer
- Stephen Marcussen – mastering
- Mike Scotella – assistant engineer, mixing assistant
- Allen Sanderson – assistant engineer, mixing assistant
- Joe Zook – assistant engineer
- Mary Leir - Art direction
- Dan Corrigan – photography
