= Gary Louris =

American musician

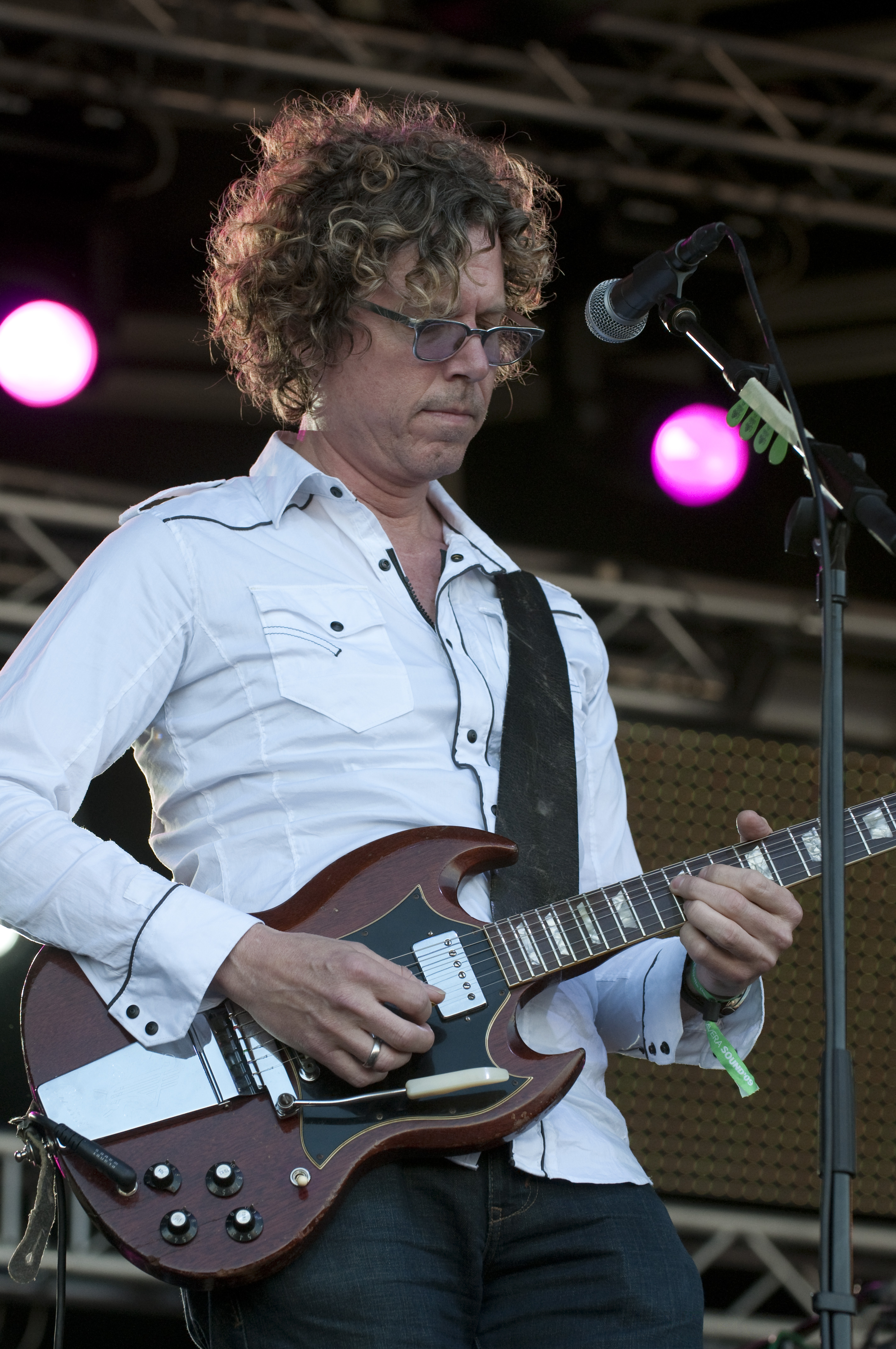
- Gary Louris May 30, 2009

Background information
- Born: March 10, 1955 (age 71)
- Origin: Toledo, Ohio, United States
- Genres: Folk, Americana, alt-country
- Years active: 1985–present
- Labels: Rykodisc, Thirty Tigers
- Website: Official website

Gary Michael Louris (born March 10, 1955) is an American guitarist, singer, and songwriter of alternative country and pop music. He is a founding member of the Minneapolis-based band the Jayhawks and their principal songwriter and vocalist after the departure of Mark Olson. Louris is often credited with the band's subsequent move from folk-country toward a more progressive, pop sound.

== Biography ==
=== Early life ===
Gary Louris grew up in Toledo, Ohio, where he took piano lessons before becoming a guitarist as a teenager. He graduated from St. John's Jesuit High School in 1973. Louris received a BA in Architecture from the University of Minnesota School of Architecture in 1977.

=== 1985–present: The Jayhawks ===
The Jayhawks were formed in 1985 in Minneapolis, Minnesota. Louris had formerly played guitar in a rockabilly band, Safety Last. On May 13, 2003, the Jayhawks appeared on The Late Show with David Letterman and performed "Save It for a Rainy Day", from their Rainy Day Music CD. The Jayhawks recorded seven albums before going on indefinite hiatus in 2005.

In 2011 the Jayhawks reunited and recorded a new album, Mockingbird Time. The lineup consisted of Mark Olson, Gary Louris, Marc Perlman, Karen Grotberg, and Tim O'Reagan. At that time Louris said, "Our goal is to make the best Jayhawks album that's ever been done". Eighteen songs were recorded, 16 of them new, but only 12 were included on the record. The band toured in support of the album.

Olson left The Jayhawks again in late 2012 and the band went on another short hiatus. They reformed in early 2014 to support the reissues of three Jayhawks albums released between 1997 and 2003. After a year of touring with most of the 1997 lineup the band announced that they would be working on a new studio album, Paging Mr. Proust, which was released on April 29, 2016 on Thirty Tigers.

=== 2005–present: Solo career ===
Louris is also a member of the intermittent Midwest musical collective Golden Smog; other members have included fellow Jayhawk Marc Perlman, Jeff Tweedy of Wilco, Dave Pirner and Dan Murphy from Soul Asylum, Kraig Johnson of Run Westy Run and Chris Mars of the Replacements.

In spring 2005, Louris and Olson toured together, billed as "From the Jayhawks: An Evening with Mark Olson & Gary Louris, Together Again."

He co-wrote the song "Jealous of the Moon" with Chris Thile in 2005, and it appeared on the Nickel Creek album Why Should the Fire Die?. Louris is also a songwriter on the 2006 Dixie Chicks album Taking the Long Way.

Louris wrote and performed "Every Word," the theme song for the 2006 documentary Wordplay.

In 2008, Louris released his first solo album, Vagabonds. The album was produced by Black Crowes frontman Chris Robinson. Of Vagabonds, Louris said in an interview, "It wasn't my intention to recapture the '70s or anything, that's just what comes out when I sing....Once we got the band together for the sessions, it actually reminded me of how the Jayhawks were when we started out. The music is new and exciting for them, and it was good for me to feed off of that." Vagabonds was recorded in Laurel Canyon, which is famous for being the center of the 1970s' singer-songwriter scene.

Robinson also produced a collaboration between Louris and his former Jayhawks bandmate Mark Olson. The album, Ready for the Flood, was released in November 2008 and January 2009 in the US.

Louris continued to play occasional solo shows even during periods of Jayhawks activity. In 2015, Louris formed a side project called Au Pair with Durham musician Django Haskins from the band The Old Ceremony. They released an album, One Armed Candy Bear, in November 2015 on Thirty Tigers followed by a handful of live shows.

Louris released his second solo album Jump For Joy in 2021. On Valentine's Day 2025, Louris' third solo album Dark Country was released on Sham/Thirty Tigers.

=== Personal life ===
Louris married Stephanie Stevenson in October 2020.

== Equipment ==
A 1969 Gibson SG Standard guitar – shown in the picture – reputed to have been formerly owned by lead guitarist John King of the Litter is now owned and frequently used by Louris in the Jayhawks and Golden Smog. The guitar was owned from 1977 to 1986 by Kevin Waddick. Chris Osgood, at the time the guitarist of the punk trio the Suicide Commandos, suggested that Waddick buy the guitar and later informed Louris that it was for sale.

Louris also uses a Martin 00-18V acoustic guitar.

== Discography ==
=== With the Jayhawks ===
- The Jayhawks (1986), also known as the Bunkhouse Tapes
- Blue Earth (1989)
- Hollywood Town Hall (1992)
- Tomorrow the Green Grass (1995)
- Sound of Lies (1997)
- Smile (2000)
- Rainy Day Music (2003)
- Live from the Women's Club (Volumes One and Two)
- Mockingbird Time (2011)
- Live at The Belly Up (2015)
- Paging Mr. Proust (2016)
- Back Roads and Abandoned Motels (2018)
- XOXO (2020)
- Sanctuary Park (2026)

=== With Safety Last ===
- Struck by Love (1983, Twin/Tone Records)

=== With Golden Smog ===
- On Golden Smog (1992)
- Down by the Old Mainstream (1996)
- Weird Tales (1998)
- Another Fine Day (2006)
- Blood on the Slacks (2007)

=== Solo ===
- Vagabonds (2008)
- Acoustic Vagabonds (2008)
- Jump for Joy (2021)
- Dark Country (2025)

=== With Mark Olson ===
- Ready for the Flood (2008)

=== With Au Pair ===
- One Armed Candy Bear (2015)

=== Guest appearances ===
- Many Great Companions: Song Revisited with Guitar and a Few Friends by Dar Williams (2010): guitar and vocals on seven tracks
