= The Jayhawks =

American country and rock band

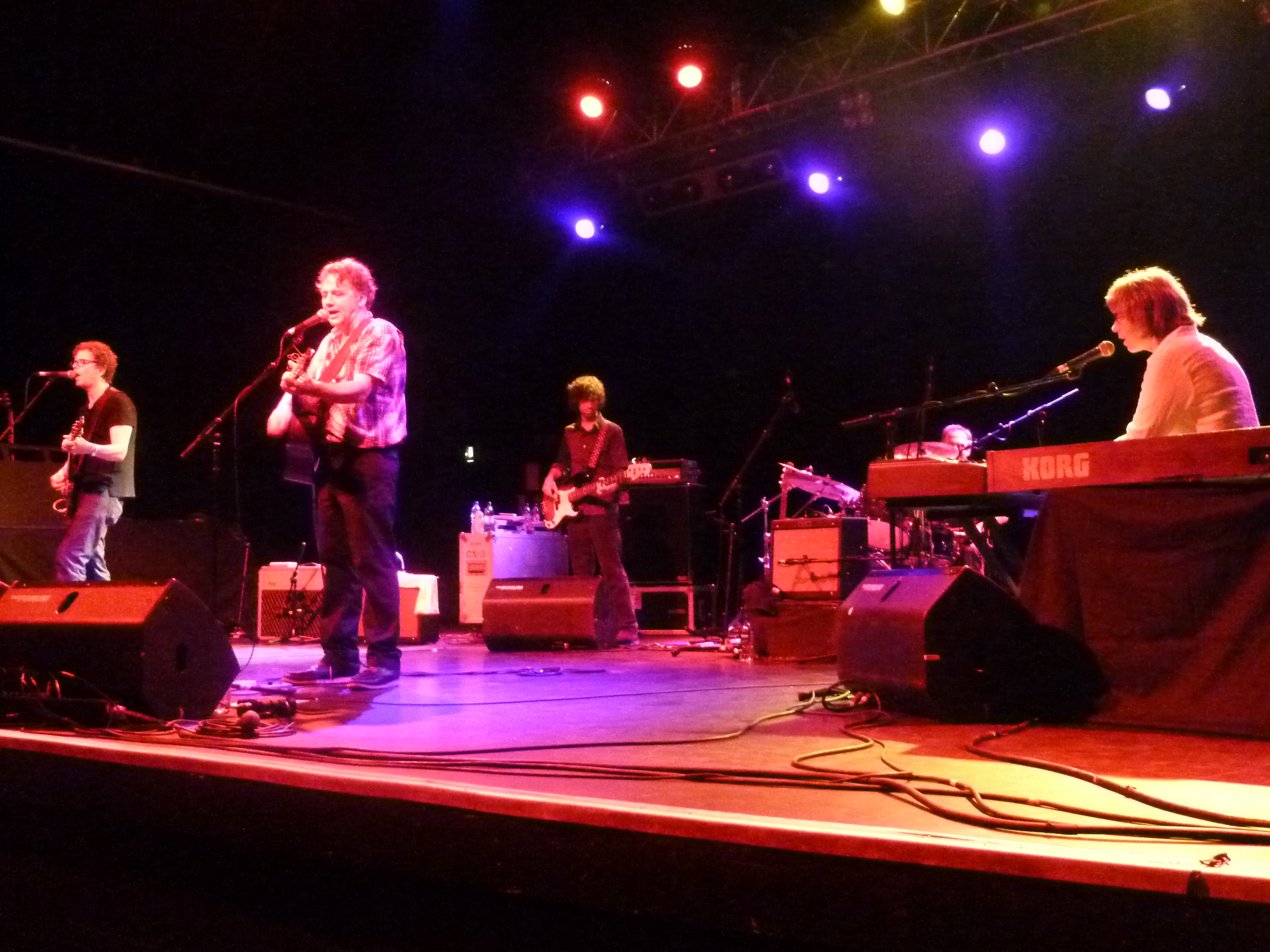
- The Jayhawks in 2011

Background information
- Origin: Minneapolis, Minnesota, U.S.
- Genres: Alternative country; country rock; alternative rock; roots rock; Americana
- Years active: 1984–2005; 2009–2012; 2014–present
- Labels: Bunkhouse; Twin/Tone; Def American; Rounder; Thirty Tigers/Sham
- Members: Gary Louris; Marc Perlman; Karen Grotberg; Tim O'Reagan
- Past members: Caleb Palmiter; Norm Rogers; Thad Spencer; Ken Callahan; Jessy Greene; Jen Gunderman; Mark Olson; Kraig Johnson; John Jackson; Stephen McCarthy
- Website: jayhawksofficial.com

The Jayhawks are an American alternative country and country rock band that emerged from the Twin Cities music scene in the mid-1980s. Led by vocalists/guitarists/songwriters Gary Louris and Mark Olson, their country rock sound was influential on many bands who played the Twin Cities circuit during the 1980s and 1990s, such as Uncle Tupelo, the Gear Daddies and the Honeydogs. They have released eleven studio albums, with and without Olson (who left the band for the first time in 1995), including five on the American Recordings label. After going on hiatus from 2005 to 2009, the 1995 lineup of the band reunited and released the album Mockingbird Time in September 2011; Olson left the band for the second time after the tour to promote the album. After another hiatus in 2013, the 1997 lineup led by Louris reunited to play shows in 2014 to support the reissue of three albums originally released between 1997 and 2003. Since then, the band has continued to tour and record, releasing the albums Live at The Belly Up in 2015; Paging Mr. Proust, co-produced by Peter Buck and Tucker Martine, in 2016; Back Roads and Abandoned Motels in 2018; XOXO in 2020; and Sanctuary Park in 2026.

== History ==
=== Founding years and early success (1984–1995) ===
The Jayhawks was formed in 1984 by Minneapolis musicians Mark Olson (guitar and vocals) and Caleb Palmiter (bass), with the duo adding Tommy Rey (drums) for its first shows. In 1985 the short-lived trio was relaunched as a four-piece band after Olson recruited Steve Retzler (guitar), Marc Perlman (bass), and Norm Rogers (drums). Later that year Gary Louris (guitar and vocals) replaced Retzler.

Their first album, The Jayhawks, was released by Bunkhouse Records, a small independent label, in 1986. Their music at the time, mostly written by Olson, showed a strong roots/country rock influence. Rogers left and was replaced by Thad Spencer, and the band worked for the next years on demo tapes in search of a major label recording contract. During this period, Louris left the band briefly (following a car accident) and Dan Gaarder replaced him. Louris returned, and the collected demos from 1986 to 1989 were brought together to create Blue Earth, released on the Minneapolis label Twin Tone in 1989. On this album Louris shared more of the songwriting with Olson. After touring the U.S. in support of Blue Earth, Spencer left the band and was replaced in 1988 by Ken Callahan, who stayed with the band until 1993.

In 1991, Dave Ayers, the head of A&R for Twin Tone, was on a phone call with A&R representative George Drakoulias of Def American while Blue Earth played in the background. Drakoulias asked about the music and eventually met with and signed the band to the label later that year.

In 1992 the Jayhawks had their major label release, Hollywood Town Hall, on Def American. The album was produced by Drakoulias and recorded primarily in Los Angeles and at Pachyderm Recording Studio in Minnesota. Though Louris's fuzzy guitar was at the forefront, a clear folksy influence was also emerging in Olson and Louris's songwriting. The album was successful, powered by the single "Waiting for the Sun", and it brought the Jayhawks a wider fan base. Adding Karen Grotberg on keyboards and vocals, the band toured extensively.

That year Olson, Louris and Perlman, along with Olson's longtime friend and future collaborator in the Original Harmony Ridge Creekdippers, Mike Russell, were recruited by Joe Henry as the backing band for his album "Short Man's Room" and its 1993 followup, "Kindness of the World."

In 1995 they went into the studio to produce Tomorrow the Green Grass on the renamed American Recordings label. The lead track, "Blue", was a Top 40 hit in Canada (peaking at No. 33), but the record's production had been very expensive and the album failed to sell as expected in the U.S. Among the album's songs is "Miss Williams' Guitar", a love song for Olson's then-girlfriend, singer-songwriter Victoria Williams (the pair later married, but divorced in February 2006). Drummer, singer and songwriter Tim O'Reagan joined the band for the 1995 tour; session drummer Don Heffington had played on the album.

=== Middle years (1995–2004) ===
By the end of 1995, Olson unexpectedly left the band to spend more time with Williams (with whom he would later form the Original Harmony Ridge Creekdippers). The band continued to record as the Jayhawks, adding Kraig Johnson on guitar. Johnson, another Minneapolis musical fixture, had played in the seminal SST band Run Westy Run, Iffy and Golden Smog.

The Jayhawks released Sound of Lies in 1997, with Louris composing most of the songs and allowing all of his influences a share in the proceedings. The result mixed straight rock (the ironic "Big Star"), psychedelic, acoustic (the title track) and even some dub elements, taking the band far from its country-influenced origins.

Smile (2000), produced by Bob Ezrin, had more of a pop music feel (which utilized new sounds for the band, like drum loops and synthesizers), jarring some of the band's long-time fans. The New York Times positively reviewed the album, but in a nod to the band's lack of widespread recognition, titled the review "What If You Made a Classic and No One Cared?" Though still a member through the recording of the album, a pregnant Grotberg left the band before the Smile tour and was replaced by Jen Gunderman. The song "I'm Gonna Make You Love Me" appeared in a Ralph Lauren commercial, the second soundtrack released from Dawson's Creek Songs from Dawson's Creek Volume 2, and the 2001 film All Over the Guy.

Rainy Day Music (2003), was stripped down, more acoustic, and generally seen as a return to their alt-country roots ("Tailspin," "Stumbling Through the Dark," "You Look So Young"). The band now consisted of founding members Louris and Perlman, along with drummer O'Reagan and touring band member ex-Long Ryder Stephen McCarthy, from Richmond, Virginia, who also played with Johnny Hott and the Piedmont Surprise. McCarthy added pedal steel, lap steel, banjo, guitar and backing vocals to the album and subsequent live shows. This lineup toured in 2003 and early 2004, including their first appearance on PBS's long-running series Austin City Limits. The band's final show was in Valencia, Spain.

In addition to their studio albums, the Jayhawks released Live from the Women's Club, an all-acoustic live recording of Louris, Perlman and O'Reagan from 2002. It was sold only at concerts as an "Official Jayhawks Bootleg." It includes the demo of the original version of "I'm Gonna Make You Love Me", called "Someone Will", and a cover of David Wiffen's "(Lost My) Driving Wheel", originally popularized by Tom Rush. A follow-up, Live from the Women's Club 2, contains the rest of the concert, including a cover of Tim Hardin's "Reason to Believe" and a rendition of "Jennifer Save Me" from Golden Smog, the alt/country supergroup of which Louris was a founding member (and which Perlman later joined).

=== Hiatus (2004–2009) ===
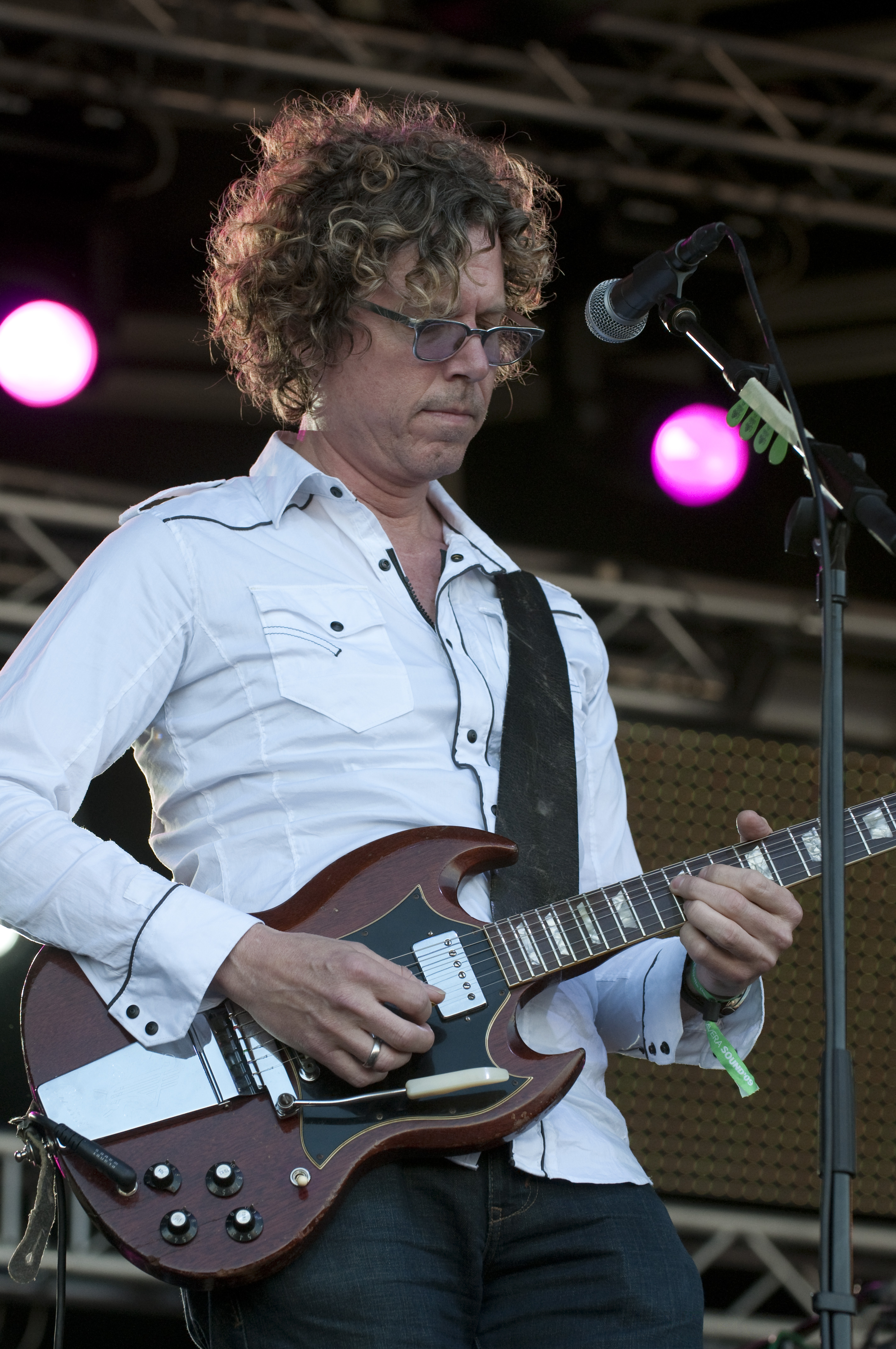
Gary Louris of the Jayhawks in May 2009

Both old and new Jayhawks members progressed to solo efforts and side projects, and the band as a whole was generally considered to be broken up and not expected to produce new material soon. However, the band members appeared to have kept in touch, tour together in their other projects, and reunited on occasion. Olson and Louris toured together in the winter of 2005 and spring of 2006, billed as "From the Jayhawks: An Evening with Mark Olson & Gary Louris, Together Again."

In September 2008, the 1995 lineup of Louris, Olson, O'Reagan, Grotberg and Perlman reunited briefly for the Azkena Rock Festival in Vitoria-Gasteiz, Spain.

In January 2009, Olson and Louris released an acoustic album, Ready for the Flood.

=== Aftermath (2009–present) ===
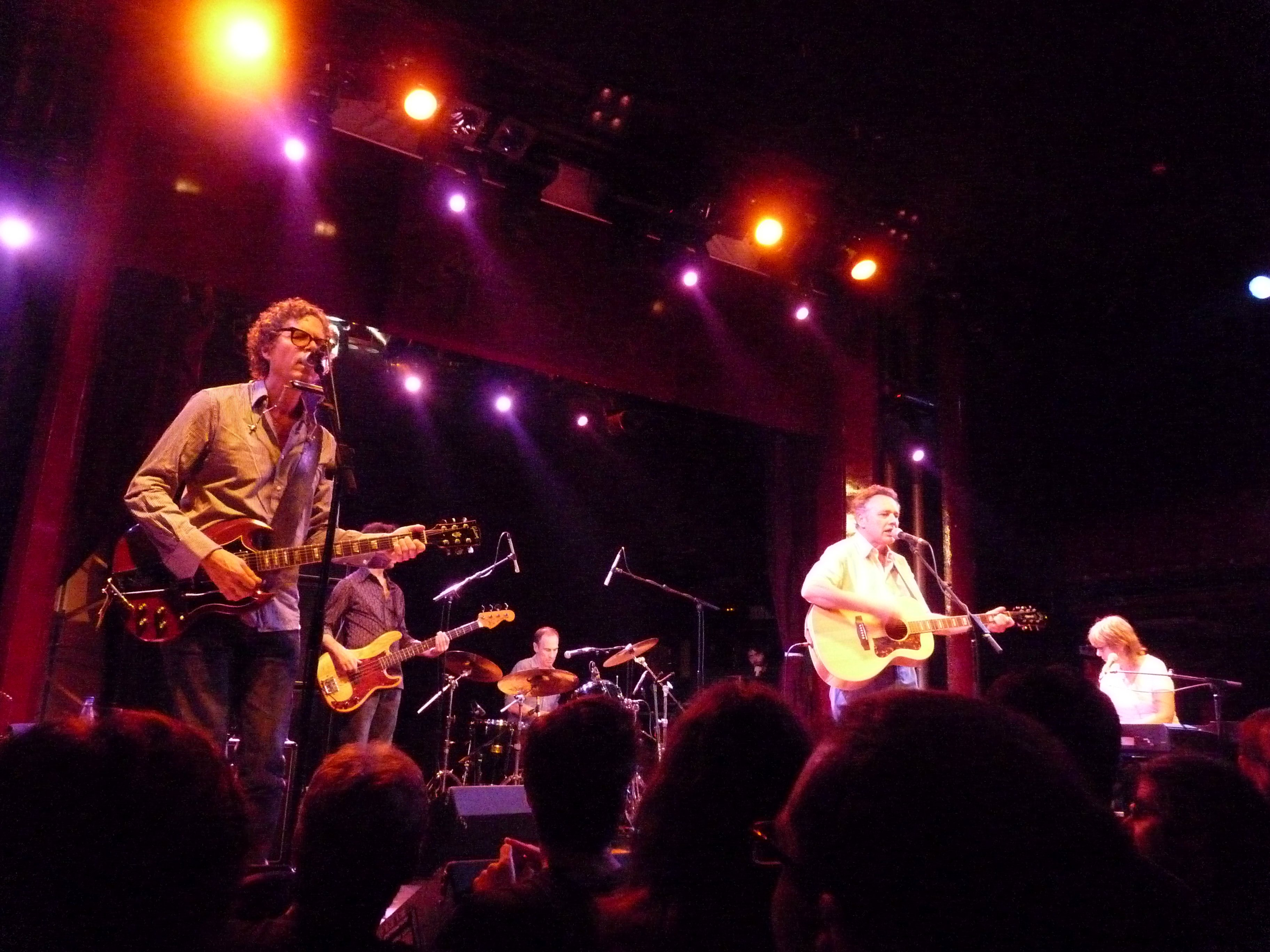
The Jayhawks in 2012

In April 2009, Billboard reported that the Jayhawks had reunited. The band's mid-1990s lineup played two shows that summer, one at Barcelona's Primavera Sound Festival on May 30 and one at Minneapolis's Basilica Block Party on July 10. Band co-leader Louris told Billboard that the reunion would be a part-time thing: "I think the plan is that we're going to play festivals. Next year, we're hoping to play Bonnaroo and things like that. We'll see if it grows from there."

In July 2009, Sony Legacy and American Recordings released Music from the North Country, The Jayhawks Anthology, a project supervised by Louris. The standard CD features highlights from the band's studio albums, while a deluxe version adds rarities, B-sides, and unreleased material, as well as a DVD of the band's music videos.

On May 18, 2010, the initial release The Jayhawks was digitally remastered from reel-to-reel and reissued on Lost Highway Records. The re-release features an eleven-page booklet designed by Olson. In fall 2010, the Jayhawks returned to the recording studio, planning to have a new album out by spring or early summer 2011.

In January 2011, Legacy Recordings reissued collector's editions of both Hollywood Town Hall and Tomorrow the Green Grass, each featuring outtakes and B-sides. Tomorrow the Green Grass features a second disc, entitled The Mystery Demos, featuring tracks from two recording sessions with Olson and Louris in 1992. Prior to the release of The Mystery Demos, several of the featured tracks had been re-recorded and released on various Jayhawks related albums, such as Olson's solo release, The Salvation Blues and the Olson–Louris collaboration Ready for the Flood. To celebrate the release of the reissues, the Jayhawks—Louris, Olson, Perlman, Grotberg, and O'Reagan—launched a concert mini-tour in January 2011, with shows in Toronto (January 18), New York City (January 20 and 21), Philadelphia (January 22), Chicago (January 27 and 28), and Minneapolis (January 29). For the January 20 show at New York's Webster Hall, the band performed Hollywood Town Hall in its entirety, followed by the complete Tomorrow the Green Grass the following evening.

In 2011 the band reunited again and recorded a new studio album. The lineup consisted of Olson, Louris, Perlman, Grotberg, and O'Reagan, and, as Louris said, "Our goal is to make the best Jayhawks album that's ever been done". Eighteen songs were recorded, 16 of them new, but only 12 made it to the final release. The album, Mockingbird Time, was released September 20. From 2009 to 2012 this lineup performed over 100 shows in North America and Europe before once again going on hiatus in the fall of 2012.

2014 saw new activity from the band once again. The final phase of the career-spanning reissue project started in 2009 commenced in the summer of 2014 with the reissue (on CD and LP) of the three albums the band made after Olson left in 1995: Sound of Lies (1997), Smile (2000) and Rainy Day Music (2003). The reissues, on American Recordings/UME, feature bonus tracks, new liner notes and fresh remastering from original analog sources by Vic Anesini. Deluxe two-LP vinyl editions were also released; this was the first vinyl release in the U.S. of Smile and the first time vinyl copies of Sound of Lies and Rainy Day Music had been available after having been long out of print. Most of the 1997 touring lineup (Louris, Perlman, O'Reagan, Grotberg and Johnson) toured in 2014 and 2015 to support the reissues, concentrating on material from the 1997–2004 era of the band that had largely gone unplayed in concert for over a decade. The band released Live at the Belly-Up, a digital-only album on April 7, 2015.

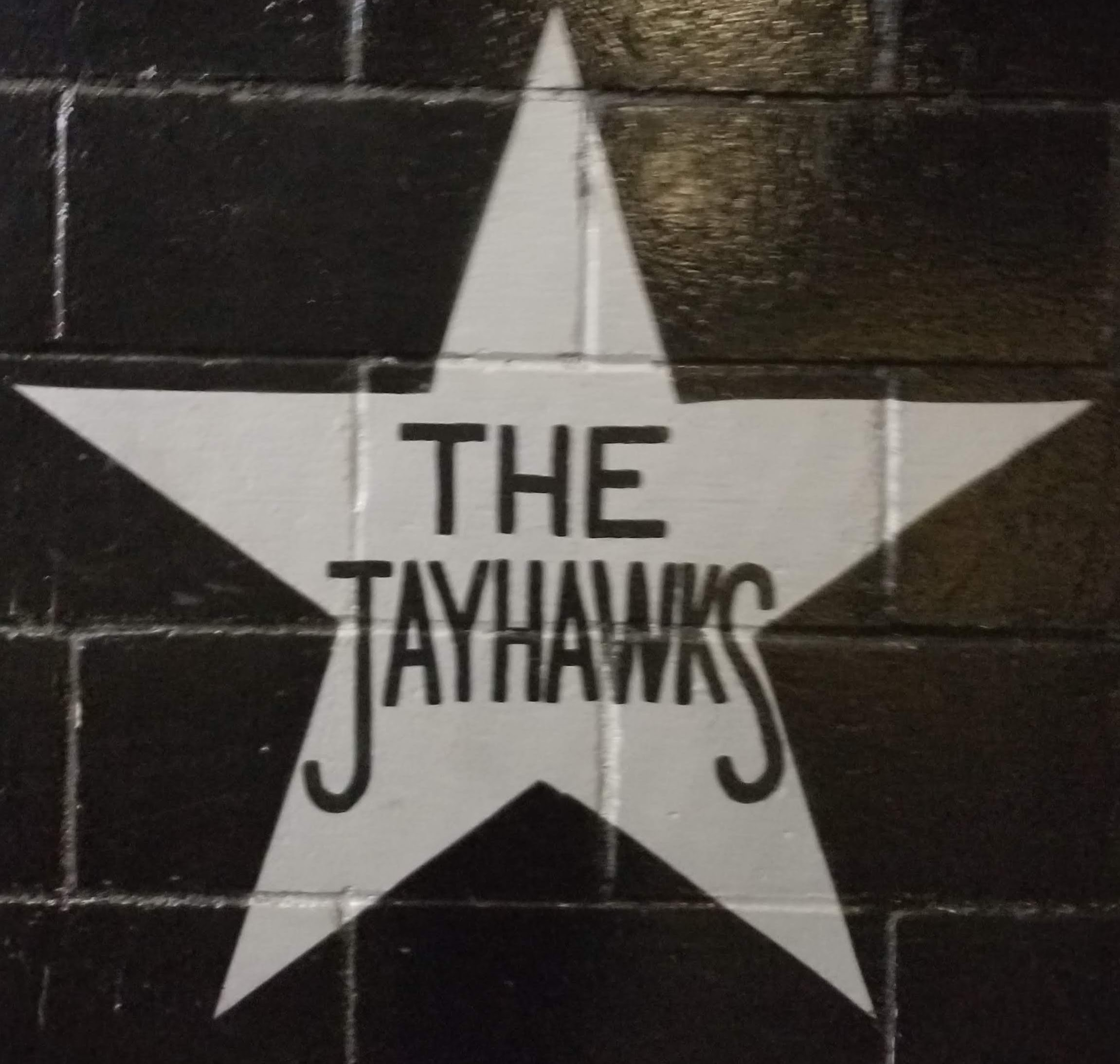
The Jayhawks' star on the outside mural of the Minneapolis nightclub First Avenue

The band announced in September 2015 that they were recording a new studio album with the 2014–2015 lineup. The album was recorded in Portland, Oregon, with Peter Buck from R.E.M and Tucker Martine producing. In January 2016 The Jayhawks announced on their Tumblr account that their new album would be titled Paging Mr. Proust and it was released on April 29, 2016 on Thirty Tigers. Kraig Johnson left the band again before the release of Paging Mr. Proust. Jeff "Chet" Lyster was added as a touring member on guitar, pedal steel and background vocals prior to the 2016 tour.

The band collaborated with Ray Davies, formerly of The Kinks, for an album released in April, 2017 titled Americana, based on Davies' experiences in the USA.

The Jayhawks also backed Wesley Stace on his 2017 album Wesley Stace's John Wesley Harding.

Norm Rogers, the band's drummer from 1984 to 1988, died on February 19, 2018.

2018 saw The Jayhawks backing Ray Davies again on his album Our Country - Americana Act II (released June 2018) as well as releasing their own album Back Roads and Abandoned Motels (July 2018). The band also recorded "What Would I Dreamer Do?" for the compilation album Forever Words, setting lyrics by Johnny Cash to music for the first time.

On July 13, 2018 the Jayhawks released Back Roads and Abandoned Motels on Sony Legacy Recordings label, featuring new fifth member John Jackson, who co-produced the album and served previously as a touring member on some tour dates since 2014.

The band has been honored with a star on the outside mural of the Minneapolis nightclub First Avenue, recognizing performers that have played sold-out shows or have otherwise demonstrated a major contribution to the culture at the iconic venue. Receiving a star "might be the most prestigious public honor an artist can receive in Minneapolis," according to journalist Steve Marsh.

In 2020, the core lineup of Louris, Perlman, O'Reagan, and Grotberg released the new album, XOXO, that featured songwriting and lead vocals from each member of the band. Previous / part-time members John Jackson and Stephen McCarthy recorded on select songs, as well. The band appeared on the CBS This Morning: Saturday national morning show on June 27, 2020. The band resumed touring in 2021, with multiple dates on the Fall 2021 tour featuring McCarthy in the performing lineup for just the second time in 17 years.

== Members ==
The current lineup of the Jayhawks consists of:

- Gary Louris: guitar, lead vocals, backing vocals
- Tim O'Reagan: drums, backing vocals, lead vocals
- Karen Grotberg: keyboards, backing vocals
- Marc Perlman: bass, backing vocals, lead vocals

== Discography ==
=== Jayhawks studio albums ===
- The Jayhawks (1986)
- Blue Earth (1989)
- Hollywood Town Hall (1992)
- Tomorrow the Green Grass (1995)
- Sound of Lies (1997)
- Smile (2000)
- Rainy Day Music (2003)
- Mockingbird Time (2011)
- Paging Mr. Proust (2016)
- Back Roads and Abandoned Motels (2018)
- XOXO (2020)
- Sanctuary Park (2026)

== See also ==
- Golden Smog
