= Prodigal (band) =

American Christian rock band

- Origin: Cincinnati, Ohio, U.S.
- Genres: Christian rock, Contemporary Christian music
- Labels: Heartland/Priority (CBS), Heartland/Benson, Silver Orb Media, Retroactive Records
- Website: prodigalnow.com

Prodigal was a Contemporary Christian music group from Cincinnati, Ohio that released three albums in the 1980s. The group's sound ranged from radio-friendly pop to keyboard-driven new wave to pop country. The group members were keyboardist Loyd Boldman, drummer Dave Workman, guitarist Rick Fields and bassist Mike Wilson. Boldman, Workman and Fields would trade off lead vocalist duties depending on the track. Boldman generally handled the rock-oriented tracks, while Workman and Fields split the more pop- and new wave-focused material. Boldman died in 2014.

== Career ==
Prodigal's self-titled debut album was released in 1982. It was named Album of the Year in 1982 by Group magazine (along with Amy Grant's Age to Age and Petra's More Power to Ya).

Electric Eye, the group's second album, was published in 1984. It received Best of the Year honors in 1984 from both CCM Magazine and Campus Life. A computer program for the Commodore 64 was mastered into a "stop-groove" or "locked groove" at the end of the vinyl record. The short BASIC program shows a static screen containing a lightly paraphrased quotation from Albert Einstein and a Biblical verse (John 14:27). The video for "Boxes" (written by Workman and directed by Boldman), won the first Gospel Music Association (GMA) Dove Award for music videos ("Best Visual Song"). The music video for the song "Fast Forward" was named Video of the Year by the National Federation of Local Cable Programmers (now the Alliance for Community Media).

Just Like Real Life was the group's third and final album, appearing in 1985. The Christian Music Archive said "This is an excellent album by one of the early new wave/rock hybrid bands of the early to mid-eighties, using equal parts keyboards and rock guitar. Sadly the band didn't get the recognition they so richly deserved, as this was a cut above most Christian albums of the time with instantly memorable songs and lyrics so intelligently written as to be in a class of their own. If they had been a secular band, they would have been early MTV stars. An essential album."

Prodigal had success on Christian radio with the songs "Invisible Man" (from Prodigal), the No. 1 single "Scene of the Crime" and "Emerald City" (from Electric Eye) and "Jump Cut" from Just Like Real Life. The band also created a number of promotional music videos for Electric Eye and Just Like Real Life.

The Encyclopedia of Contemporary Christian Music says, "Prodigal was in tune with the sounds and spirit of the early ‘80's...while writing songs that expanded the boundaries of the worship and evangelism fare that typified contemporary Christian music at the time."

== Prodigal discography ==
- 1982 Prodigal
- 1984 Electric Eye
- 1985 Just Like Real Life
- 2014 Electric Eye 30th Anniversary 3-CD Boxed Set
- 2018 Prodigal Retroactive Records Legends Remastered Series CD Reissue
- 2018 Electric Eye Retroactive Records Legends Remastered Series CD Reissue
- 2018 Just Like Real Life Retroactive Records Legends Remastered Series CD Reissue
- 2020 Electric Eye Vinyl Remaster

== Loyd Boldman discography ==
- 1988 Sleep Without Dreams
- 1997 One Hallelujah: A Northland Worship Album
- 2000 How Can I Keep From Singing: A Northland Worship Album
- 2007 Where God Wants To Be: Northland Christmas Worship

== Rick Fields discography ==
- 1988 Sleep Without Dreams - Loyd Boldman
- 1998 My One Desire - Vineyard Community Church
- 1999 Finishing School - The Perkolaters
- 2000 Deeper State of Blue - Janet Pressley
- 2001 Open Hands Bare Feet - Crossroads Band
- 2001 World of the Satisfyn' Place - David Wolfenberger
- 2002 (It's Always) Sunrise For Someone - Sunrise for Someone
- 2004 Songs for the Journey - Crossroads Band
- 2006 Portrait of Narcissus - David Wolfenberger
- 2008 Summer Lake Champion - Sunrise for Someone
- 2009 On Top of the World - The Perkolaters
- 2010 Blue Water - Mick Denton

== Dave Workman discography ==
- 1981 Behold the Man - Zion\Rich Mullins
- 1998 My One Desire - Vineyard Community Church
