= Sweet Relief =

Sweet Relief may refer to:

- Sweet Relief Musicians Fund, a nonprofit charity that maintains a financial fund to assist musicians in need
  - Sweet Relief: A Benefit for Victoria Williams, a tribute album released by the charity to assist Victoria Williams
  - Sweet Relief II: Gravity of the Situation, a tribute album released by the charity to assist Vic Chesnutt
- "Sweet Relief", a song from the album Silence Between Songs by Madison Beer (2023)
- "Sweet Relief", a non-album single released by Kimbra (2016)
