= Glum =

Studio album by Giant Sand
- Released: 1994
- Studio: Kingsway
- Genre: Rock
- Length: 49:41
- Label: Imago
- Producer: Malcolm Burn; Howe Gelb; John Convertino

Giant Sand chronology
Stromausfall (1993)	Glum (1994)	Goods and Services (1995)

Glum is an album by the American band Giant Sand, released in 1994. It was the band's first album to be distributed by a major label. Giant Sand supported it with a North American tour.

== Production ==
Recorded at Daniel Lanois's New Orleans home studio, the album was produced by Malcolm Burn, Howe Gelb, and John Convertino. Gelb wrote "Bird Song" with his young daughter. "Frontage Road" is about characters living in a subdivision. Pappy Allen sang on the cover of Hank Williams's "I'm So Lonesome I Could Cry"; the album is dedicated to him. Victoria Williams contributed vocals to "Spun". Chris Cacavas, of Green on Red, played keyboards on "1 Helvakowboy Song". Rainer Ptacek played a dobro on "Left"; Peter Holsapple contributed slide guitar to "Yer Ropes". "Painted Bird" was inspired by the Jerzy Kosiński novel.

== Critical reception ==
Professional ratings
Review scores
Source	Rating
AllMusic	4/5 stars
The Arizona Republic	3/5 stars
Philadelphia Daily News	3/4 stars
Rolling Stone	3.5/5 stars
Spin Alternative Record Guide	7/10
The Tampa Tribune	2.5/4 stars
The Virgin Encyclopedia of Nineties Music	3/5 stars

The Philadelphia Daily News wrote that "Gelb writes and growls the glum, surreal sagas of life on the edge with the passion of a man possessed." Rolling Stone said that the title track "trails an especially gnarled solo with an Ivory-soft surf-guitar finale as its lyrics twist from contempt to confusion." Newsday concluded that "if music this genuinely idiosyncratic can penetrate the mainstream, then there truly has been an alternative revolution." Trouser Press opined that Gelb's "unilateral rejection of form can get a bit tiring, especially when the meandering 'Frontage Rd.' runs smack into the stoner fusion of '1 Helvakowboy Song'."

The Vancouver Sun praised "Gelb's idiosyncratic electric guitar style—something like getting Crispin Glover drunk and setting him loose with Neil Young's gear." The Washington Post deemed the album a "self-indulgently slapdash effort." The Times Colonist determined that "Glum sounds like an electric and electrifying soundtrack for a modern Heart of Darkness, if Kurtz were holed up in a broken-down trailer in the California desert instead of the jungle." The Arizona Republic stated that the album "blends the experimental and obscure with twangy, insistent rock beats."

Mojo considered Glum to be "an obscure gem" and Giant Sand's "masterpiece".

== Track listing ==
1. "Glum" – 5:00
2. "Yer Ropes" – 5:06
3. "Happenstance" – 5:07
4. "Frontage Road" – 4:35
5. "1 Helvakowboy Song" – 3:02
6. "Painted Bird" – 4:37
7. "Spun" – 3:43
8. "Left" – 5:01
9. "Faithful" – 6:08
10. "Bird Song" – 3:38
11. "I'm So Lonesome I Could Cry" – 3:44
