= Sweet Relief: A Benefit for Victoria Williams =

Compilation album by Various artists
- Released: July 6, 1993
- Genre: Alternative rock
- Length: 54:44
- Labels: Thirsty Ear; Chaos
- Producers: Sylvia Reed; Kelley Walker

Sweet Relief chronology
Sweet Relief: A Benefit for Victoria Williams (1993)	Sweet Relief II: Gravity of the Situation (1996)

Sweet Relief: A Benefit for Victoria Williams is a 1993 tribute album that features a variety of alternative rock bands covering songs written by Victoria Williams. Except for “Crazy Mary”, which she was to record on Loose and “This Moment”, all these songs had been recorded on either Happy Come Home or Swing the Statue!. The project was inspired by Williams being diagnosed with multiple sclerosis, and led to the creation of the Sweet Relief Fund, a charity that aids professional musicians (of any stature) in need of health care.

A sequel album, Sweet Relief II: Gravity of the Situation, was released in 1996.

== Reception ==
Professional ratings
Review scores
Source	Rating
AllMusic	4/5 stars
Chicago Tribune	4/4 stars
Christgau's Consumer Guide	(neither)
Encyclopedia of Popular Music	3/5 stars
Kerrang!	3/5 stars
Los Angeles Times	3/4 stars
NME	5/10
Rolling Stone	4/5 stars
USA Today	3.5/4 stars

Music critic Roch Parisien of Allmusic praised the album, writing it "offers a unique opportunity to introduce yourself to an enduring songwriter while savoring some of the day's most intriguing musicians."

== Track listing ==
1. Soul Asylum – "Summer of Drugs"
2. Lucinda Williams – "Main Road"
3. Pearl Jam – "Crazy Mary"
4. Buffalo Tom – "Merry Go Round"
5. Michael Penn – "Weeds"
6. Shudder To Think – "Animal Wild"
7. Lou Reed – "Tarbelly and Featherfoot"
8. Maria McKee – "Opelousas (Sweet Relief)"
9. Matthew Sweet – "This Moment"
10. Evan Dando – "Frying Pan"
11. The Jayhawks – "Lights"
12. The Waterboys – "Why Look at the Moon"
13. Giant Sand – "Big Fish"
14. Michelle Shocked – "Holy Spirit"
