= Purge & Slouch =

Studio album by Giant Sand
- Released: 1993
- Genre: Folk rock
- Labels: Brake Out, Restless
- Producers: Howe Gelb, Harvey Moltz, John Convertino

Giant Sand chronology
Center of the Universe (1992)	Purge & Slouch (1993)	Stromausfall (1993)

Purge & Slouch is an album by the American band Giant Sand, released in 1993 through the German label Brake Out Records. It was released by Restless Records the following year. The band supported the album with a UK tour. Frontman Howe Gelb referred to the music as "smash jazz".

== Production ==
Giant Sand made the album in order to satisfy its contractual obligations to Restless. It was recorded at a house in the Tucson area; Gelb allegedly taped his vocals and guitar playing while lounging on a couch. The band improvised most of the music, which they had a difficult reproducing in a live setting. Susan Cowsill and Vicki Peterson sang on "Corridor". Rainer Ptacek played guitar on many of the tracks; Malcolm Burn contributed on bass. "Dock of the Bay" is a cover of the Otis Redding song. "Santana, Castanada & You" [sic] refers to two Carlos, Carlos Santana and Carlos Castaneda. Gelb later acknowledged the informality and low stakes of the sessions, saying the he enjoyed what many journalists criticized. Stromausfall, the band's next album, released in a press run of 2,000 copies, included music recorded during the same sessions.

== Critical reception ==
Professional ratings
Review scores
Source	Rating
AllMusic	2.5/5 stars
Robert Christgau	(dud)
New York Daily News	3/5 stars
Rolling Stone	1.5/5 stars
Spin Alternative Record Guide	7/10
USA Today	3/4 stars
The Virgin Encyclopedia of Nineties Music	3/5 stars

USA Today called the album "charmingly tattered", noting that "Gelb mixes a half-dozen genres with his off-kilter sensibilities to produce addictive countrified folk-rock." Rolling Stone advised: "The debate among cultists who've supported Gelb for more than a decade is whether such albums reveal a dismaying lack of craft or are works of disjointed brilliance. Make no mistake: Purge and Slouch is lazy." The Press-Telegram said that "Gelb gets into some maddeningly introverted desert-jazz mumbling musings on occasion, but the disc's got some great high points scattered throughout".

The Arizona Daily Star praised the "slight country lopes, lazy blues shouts, unvarnished honky-tonk jams and the occasional bout of impatient guitar skronking." Trouser Press opined that "much jam-session tomfoolery ensues, with the sole reward being a chance to hear Arizona legend Al Perry scrabble out some proto-garage licks on 'Slander'." LA Weekly called the album "ragged-edged, tumultuous, inward and poetic". The New York Daily News stated that "Gelb has given his rundown, dusty music an unrushed allure and made a sound as expansive as a desert sky."

== Track listing ==
No.	Title	Length
1.	"Slander"
2.	"Bender"
3.	"Swamp Thing"
4.	"Santana, Castanada & You"
5.	"Blue Lit Rope"
6.	"Overture (Part 1)"
7.	"Rice Road Rumba"
8.	"Corridor"
9.	"Slice & Dice Blues"
10.	"High Lonesome Curl"
11.	"New Carjack City Blues"
12.	"Owed Ode"
13.	"Overture, Pt. 2"
14.	"Here on the Planet"
15.	"Elevator Music"
16.	"Song for the Accountants"
17.	"Dock of the Bay"
18.	"Tripping Moon"
19.	"Thin Lizzy Tribute/Personality Flaws/Last Word Jonny"
20.	"Bed of Nails"
21.	"Dance of Cicadas"
