= Collberg =

Collberg is a Swedish surname. Notable people with the surname include:

- Andrew Collberg (born 1987), Swedish musician
- Sebastian Collberg (born 1994), Swedish ice hockey player

== See also ==
- Colberg
