= Still Lookin' Good to Me =

Studio album by The Band of Blacky Ranchette
- Released: 2003
- Genre: Alternative country
- Length: 42:22
- Label: Thrill Jockey
- Producer: Howe Gelb

The Band of Blacky Ranchette chronology
Sage Advice (1990)	Still Lookin' Good to Me (2003)

Professional ratings
Review scores
Source	Rating
AllMusic	4/5 stars
The Guardian	4/5 stars
PopMatters	favourable
Rolling Stone	3/5 stars
Stylus Magazine	C+

Still Lookin' Good to Me is a 2003 album by the Band of Blacky Ranchette. The album features contributions from John Convertino, Joey Burns, Neko Case, Richard Buckner, Cat Power, M. Ward, Kurt Wagner, Jason Lytle and Bob Neuwirth.

== Track listing ==
All songs were written by Howe Gelb, except where noted.

1. "The Train Singer's Song" – 5:39
2. "Searing Wine" – 0:59
3. "Rusty Tracks" – 4:32
4. "Mope-a-Long Rides Again" – 2:57
5. "Getting It Made" – 3:51
6. "Under the Table" – 2:16
7. "Working on the Railroad" (traditional, arranged by Gelb)– 2:33
8. "Bored Lil' Devil" – 2:50
9. "The Muss of Paradise" – 2:25
10. "Left Again" – 3:45
11. "The Moons of Impulse" – 2:50
12. "Airstream" – 2:07
13. "My Hoo Ha" – 2:09
14. "Square" (Rainer Ptacek, Gelb) – 3:23

== Personnel ==
- Howe Gelb – vocals, guitar, piano, banjolin (all tracks)
- Joey Burns – bass, cello, backing vocals (4, 10, 14)
- John Convertino – drums (1, 4, 8, 10, 11, 14)
- Jon Rauhouse – pedal steel guitar (1, 4)
- Matt Ward – guitar (3)
- Neko Case – vocals (4, 5, 8)
- Peter Dombernowsky – percussion (5)
- Tom Larkins – drums (5)
- Thoger Lund – bass (5)
- Anders Pedersen – mandolin, lap steel guitar (5)
- Paolo Russo – bandonion
- Sofie Albertsen Gelb – vocals (6)
- Luka Ry Gelb – vocals (6)
- Jason Lytle – vocals, drums, keyboards (7)
- Lucky Lew – bass (7)
- Kurt Wagner – vocals (9)
- Bob Neuwirth – guitar (12)
- Chan Marshall – vocals (13)
- Richard Buckner – vocals (5)
