= Ramp (album) =

Studio album by Giant Sand
- Released: 1991
- Genre: Country rock
- Label: Amazing Black Sand
- Producer: Howe Gelb

Giant Sand chronology
Swerve (1990)	Ramp (1991)	Center of the Universe (1992)

Ramp is an album by the American band Giant Sand, released in 1991. The album was released via frontman Howe Gelb's Amazing Black Sand label, before being picked up by Restless Records.

== Production ==
The majority of the album was produced by Gelb. Victoria Williams contributed backing vocals to the album's second track, "Romance of Falling," the only track produced by Dusty Wakeman. Pappy Allen also makes an appearance on Ramp. The album was recorded in Los Angeles and Tucson.

== Critical reception ==
Professional ratings
Review scores
Source	Rating
AllMusic	4/5 stars
Robert Christgau	A−
The Encyclopedia of Popular Music	3/5 stars
MusicHound Rock: The Essential Album Guide	3.5/5 stars
Spin Alternative Record Guide	7/10

Robert Christgau wrote: "The first side makes something of the dissociated atmospherics that undermined the band's previous umpteen releases; the second's almost popwise. Together they're what country-rock was never really like, or wanted to be." Trouser Press thought that "Gelb seems to have found a way to propel himself at will into a deconstruction zone where boogie can mutate into pre-rock vocal harmony ('Warm Storm') and Sun Ra can be construed as a lounge lizard (the slurry 'Jazzer Snipe')." The Austin American-Statesman deemed it "the kind of revelatory release that makes one want to search out everything the band has previously recorded." LA Weekly likened the album to "Neil Young hallucinating punk rock... But this time out, the riffs are gentler, the harmonies sweeter."

The Spin Alternative Record Guide opined that the band "has mastered the art of rambling within a loose structure."

== Track listing ==
No.	Title	Length
1.	"Warm Storm"
2.	"Romance of Falling"
3.	"Wonder"
4.	"Welcome to My World"
5.	"Anti-Shadow"
6.	"Jazzer Snipe"
7.	"Z.Z. Quicker Foot"
8.	"Neon Filler"
9.	"Seldom Matters"
10.	"Resolver"
11.	"Nowhere"
12.	"Always Horses Coming"
13.	"Patsy's Blues"

== Personnel ==
- Joey Burns – bass
- John Convertino – drums
- Howe Gelb – guitar, vocals
