= Long Stem Rant =

Studio album by Giant Sand
- Released: 1989
- Genre: Art rock
- Label: Homestead
- Producer: Howe Gelb, Eric Westfall, John Convertino

Giant Sand chronology
Giant Sandwich (1989)	Long Stem Rant (1989)	Swerve (1990)

Long Stem Rant is an album by the American band Giant Sand, released in 1989. It sold around 15,000 copies in its first year of release. The band supported the album with a UK tour.

== Production ==
Giant Sand recorded the album over three days, in a barn in Rimrock, California, with many of the songs composed as the tape rolled. Frontman Howe Gelb and drummer John Convertino were the only musicians to play on most of the tracks. Paula Jean Brown played bass on "Searchlight". Some of the songs were inspired by the end of one of Gelb's romantic relationships. He chose to record the songs with very cheap guitars and amplifiers. Gelb referred to the shorter interludes as "miracle minutes". He wrote "Paved Road to Berlin" for a West German admirer of Giant Sand. Gelb used a water cooler and file cabinet as percussive instruments on "Sandman". "Patsy Does Dylan" is sung by Gelb's daughter.

== Critical reception ==
Professional ratings
Review scores
Source	Rating
AllMusic	4/5 stars
The Great Alternative & Indie Discography	6/10
MusicHound Rock: The Essential Album Guide	3.5/5 stars
Spin Alternative Record Guide	7/10
The Virgin Encyclopedia of Nineties Music	3/5 stars

The New York Times said that "the complete songs are structured around traditional three-chord guitar melodies, but Mr. Gelb has the habit of changing the chords without warning, tossing in odd notes and off-key rifts." The Guardian noted that "the wide-open spaces of the American heartland have ... produced the oddest and freakiest album of the week ... even [Gelb's] record company agrees that the new set is his most 'difficult' to date." The Arizona Daily Star concluded the Gelb "needs an editor, but ... there's a lot of charm in his post-industrialist, suburban landscape of ingenuous honky-tonk art rock." Factsheet Five called Long Stem Rant "bouncy music, whipsawing country/folk influences with solid rock". The Times labeled the album "the aural equivalent of a scrapbook, and in among the doodles and splodges there is a patchy, perverse brilliance at work".

Trouser Press opined that "Long Stem Rant finds both its greatest strength (a contagious, breathless spontaneity) and its greatest weakness (a surfeit of tangled loose ends) in the circumstances of its creation". In 2010, The Quietus deemed the album "an inspired mess of fuzzy guitar scrawl, driving rhythms and brilliantly wonky piano playing that suggests Thelonious Monk in Wild West saloon."

== Track listing ==
No.	Title	Length
1.	"Unfinished Love"
2.	"Sandman"
3.	"Bloodstone"
4.	"Searchlight"
5.	"Smash Jazz"
6.	"Sucker in a Cage"
7.	"Patsy Does Dylan"
8.	"It's Long 'Bout Now"
9.	"Lag Craw"
10.	"Loving Cup"
11.	"Paved Road to Berlin"
12.	"Anthem"
13.	"Picture Shows"
14.	"Drum & Guitar"
15.	"Get to Leave"
16.	"Searchlight Cha Cha"
17.	"Return of the Big Red Guitar"
18.	"Stuck Dog"
19.	"Real Gone Blue Guitar"
20.	"The Jig Zup"
