= Katie Reider =

American singer-songwriter (1978–2008)

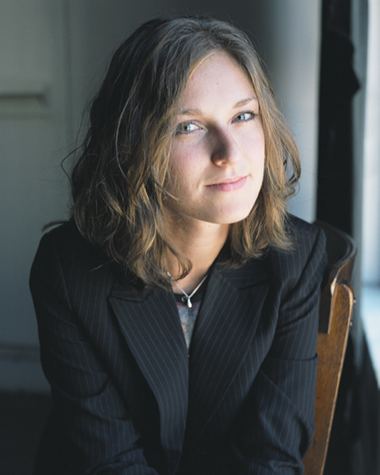

Background information
- Born: Kathryn Ann Reider; May 23, 1978; Cincinnati, Ohio
- Origin: Cincinnati, Ohio, United States
- Died: July 14, 2008 (aged 30) Beth Israel Medical Center, New York City, NY
- Genres: Rock, Contemporary folk, singer-songwriter
- Occupation: Musician
- Instruments: Vocals, guitar
- Years active: 1990s–2006
- Label: Blue Jordan Records
- Past members: The Katie Reider Band: Katie Reider (acoustic guitar & vocals); Dave Eberhardt (electric guitar); Lenny Hickey (bass); Bill McCarthy (drums); Previous members: Robbie Reider (guitar); Greg Hanson (bass); Josh Seurkamp (drums); Tyler Brown (piano, engineer)
- Website: www.katiereider.com

Kathryn Ann "Katie" Reider (May 23, 1978 – July 14, 2008) was an American singer-songwriter from Cincinnati, Ohio. Reider described her own music as "Folk/pop/rock fused together into some sort of 'genre-less' category." Reider released four albums, won five Cincinnati music awards and had her songs featured on television programming by ABC, Lifetime, and on the WB's Dawson's Creek before health problems emerged in 2006 that ultimately led to her death two years later. Shortly after her death, the New York Times stated that Reider was "a singer-songwriter with a huge following back home and a growing national fan base, who seemed on the cusp of much larger success when her life was destroyed by a rare tumor that ate into her jaw and face, stole her voice, left her blind in one eye and finally killed her (in July 2008) at the age of 30."

== Biography ==
=== Early life ===
Reider was born in Cincinnati, Ohio on May 23, 1978, to Gaile and Rob Reider and grew up as one of six children in nearby Montgomery. Reider grew up surrounded by music. Her father, Rob Reider, was a singer and band leader on the syndicated entertainment program The Bob Braun Show during the 1970s and early '80s. Her grandmother, Ann (Beasley) Reider, was a singer and popular television host on WBNS-TV in Columbus, Ohio. Reider's parents gave her first guitar when she was in fifth grade. It was a red Gibson Epiphone. Reider's parents were supportive of her interest in music. Reider would later recall, "I started out singing in front of my family in front of the fireplace. I would take out a poker from next to the fireplace and use it as a microphone."

=== 1990s ===
Reider began performing her own songs publicly in the early 1990s while still a high school student at Cincinnati Hills Christian Academy. She started singing in local coffeehouses and later at the Crossroads Community Church in Oakley. Janet Pressley saw Reider perform at the Blue Jordan Coffeehouse in Cincinnati's Northside in 1993. Pressley recalled, "She had the pipes back then."

In the summer of 1995, just before her senior year of high school, Reider met Karen Boone and Dan Stroeh while in a Christian theater group. Over the course of several years Reider and Boone became lovers and partners. Stroeh presided over a backyard wedding and Boone took Reider's last name. They remained a couple until Reider's death. Karen gave birth to two children, whom they parented together.

Reider lived in Columbus, Ohio throughout the late 1990s and early 2000s while majoring in family studies at the Ohio State University, but she did not frequently perform there. She primarily returned to Cincinnati to perform gigs during her early career.

Reider joined the artist cooperative label co-founded by Janet Pressley, Blue Jordan Records, and released her first album, Wonder, in late 1998. According to Reider, the title contained a double meaning: "I wonder about a lot of things, and then I wonder about it all and how wonderful it is." The album was described in the Cincinnati Post as "an incredibly mature project – both musically and lyrically – for someone so young. Her songs mainly deal with the aches of lost and found love, but in a way that is far more seasoned than the angst-filled, angry lyrics of such artists as Alanis Morissette."

Locally, the album was a major success, and Reider won more awards than any other performer at the 1999 Cincinnati Area Pop Music Awards (known in Cincinnati as "Cammy Awards"). She gained recognition as Best Folk/Bluegrass Vocalist, Best New Artist, and Songwriter of the Year.

=== 2000s ===
In October 2000, two songs from Reider's debut album, "What You Don't Know" and "Piece of Soul," were featured on episodes of the WB show, Dawson's Creek. "What You Don't Know" was played for three minutes on the show. Reider said she experienced being "outside of herself" for a moment: "I had some friends over and we watched it. I'm telling the truth when I say I never watched Dawson's Creek before that. It was surreal and overwhelming how cool it was." She told the Cincinnati Post that traffic on her website increased by 1,200 hits the next day.

In December 2000, Reider released the live album, No Retakes. The album featured the same musicians that appeared on her first studio album, Dave Eberhardt (electric guitar), Greg Hansen (bass), Josh Seurkamp (drums) and Reider's brother Robbie on guitar. Reider's father, Rob, helped engineer the project and suggested the title. The tracks feature a mix of new songs and songs that appeared on Wonder. The recordings were from performances at the York Street Cafe and the Aronoff Center. According to the Cincinnati Post: "Throughout the set we hear how Ms. Reider's voice is growing more powerful and sensual as her band soars on her deliciously subtle hooks and melodies."

Reider released her second studio album in December 2001, I Am Ready. Just a couple weeks later, the Cincinnati Post named it one of the top ten local albums of the year, calling it "more musically diverse, showing mature song crafting and confident, gutty vocals way beyond her 23 years."

Reider was again nominated for best folk/bluegrass vocalist at the Cammy Awards in 2002 and 2003. At the time, she regularly played gigs at the York Street Cafe in Newport, Kentucky, the Barrel House in Cincinnati and at Club 202 in Columbus.

Reider's music continued to gain exposure from television programs. On December 8, 2002, her recording of "Silent Night" from No Retakes aired on an episode of the Lifetime series Strong Medicine. Less than a month later, the WB launched a Web site that allowed fans of Dawson's Creek to order a custom compilation CD containing their favorite songs from the show. The promotion featured the 80 most requested songs from the approximately 700 songs that were featured in the series during its six-year run. Both of Reider's songs were included. Reider's music also entered into rotation on Sirius Satellite Radio Channel No. 30 (The Coffee House).

Reider died on July 14, 2008, from a cerebral hemorrhage.

In addition to her music, Reider was known for her activism. Reider spoke out about gay rights issues and was a performer at gay pride celebrations.

== Awards ==
- Cincinnati Area Pop Music Awards (Cammy Awards)

- 1999 – Best folk/bluegrass vocalist
- 1999 – Songwriter of the year
- 1999 – Best new artist
- 2000 – Best folk/bluegrass vocalist
- 2000 – Best solo act

- Reider was also nominated in 1999 for a Cincinnati Entertainment Award in the new artist of the year/critical achievement category, an award that went to the band, All Weather Girl. Reider was again nominated for best folk/bluegrass vocalist at the Cammy awards in 2002 and 2003.

== Albums ==
- Wonder (1998, Blue Jordan)
- No Retakes (2001, Blue Jordan)
- I Am Ready (2002, Blue Jordan)
- Simplicity (2004, KRM)
