= Chore of Enchantment =

Studio album by Giant Sand
- Released: March 7, 2000
- Recorded: Tucson, New York City and Memphis
- Genres: Alternative rock, folk rock
- Length: 59:53
- Label: Thrill Jockey / Loose Music (Europe)
- Producers: John Parish; Jim Dickinson; Kevin Salem

Giant Sand chronology
| Build Your Own Night It's Easy (1997) | Chore of Enchantment (2000) | The Rock Opera Years (2000) |

Chore of Enchantment is a studio album by the alternative rock band Giant Sand. It was released in March 2000 by Thrill Jockey.

== Reception ==
Professional ratings
Review scores
| Source | Rating |
|---|---|
| AllMusic | 4/5 stars |
| The Austin Chronicle | 4/5 stars |
| The Guardian | 4/5 stars |
| NME | 8/10 |
| Q | 4/5 stars |
| Record Collector | 4/5 stars |
| Rolling Stone | 3/5 stars |
| Spin | 8/10 |

The British music journalism publication NME praised the album's "raw but tender empathy in songs full of unexpected departures".

== Legacy ==
The album was included in the book 1001 Albums You Must Hear Before You Die.

== Track listing ==
All tracks were written by Howe Gelb.

1. "Overture" – 0:48
2. "(Well) Dusted (For the Millennium)" – 3:47
3. "Punishing Sun" – 3:13
4. "X-Tra Wide" – 3:27
5. "1972" – 1:03
6. "Temptation of Egg" – 3:41
7. "Raw" – 3:29
8. "Wolfy" – 4:25
9. "Shiver" – 4:00
10. "Dirty from the Rain" – 3:34
11. "Astonished (In Memphis)" – 5:32
12. "No Reply" – 4:34
13. "Satellite" – 6:48
14. "Bottom Line Man" – 4:41
15. "Way to End the Day" – 4:47
16. "Shrine" – 2:04

== Personnel ==
- Howe Gelb – guitar, piano, vocals
- John Convertino – drums
- Joey Burns – bass guitar, cello, guitar, backing vocals
- Juliana Hatfield – backing vocals (6)
- Sofie Albertsen Gelb – backing vocals (9, 15)
- Jim Dickinson – mellotron (2), piano, organ (11)
- John Parish – piano, pump organ (15), door shutter (16)
- Kevin Salem – guitar (3), acoustic guitar (4), mellotron (9)
- Susan Marshall-Powell – backing vocals (4, 11)
- Jackie Johnson – backing vocals (4, 11)
- William Brown – backing vocals (4)
- Rich Mercurio – drums (4, 9)
- John Abbey – bass guitar (4, 8, 12)
- Rob Arthur – mellotron (4), organ (9, 12)
- Nick Luca – piano (5)
- Neil Harry – pedal steel (7)
- Alan Bezozi – drum loop (8)
- Scott Loder – bass guitar (9)
- David Mansfield – pedal steel (9, 12), banjo (9)
- Lydia Kavanaugh – backing vocals (12)
- Paula Brown – bass guitar, backing vocals (13)
- Rainer Ptacek – slide guitar (16)
