= Blue Jordan Records =

- Founded: 1996
- Founder: Janet Pressley
- Genre: Folk, folk-rock
- Country of origin: U.S.
- Location: Cincinnati, Ohio

Blue Jordan Records is an independent record label founded by Janet Pressley in Cincinnati, Ohio. In addition to releasing records the label has organized concerts and music festivals.

The Cincinnati Post said, "Blue Jordan is as much a state of mind as a record label" and described its origins, "When the coffeehouse folded the musicians who played and sang there simply stuck together and have been releasing CDs and making music ever since."

== Festivals and concert series ==
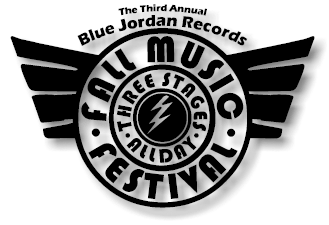
Logo for the Blue Jordan Fall Music Festival 2000

The label has organized a number of shows and music festivals over the years, notably the Blue Jordan Fall Music Festival at the Heritage Village of Sharon Woods Park in Sharonville, Ohio. The festival ran 1998–2000. Headliners included acts like Carrie Newcomer (1998), Over the Rhine (1999), the Cowboy Junkies, and Victoria Williams and the Original Harmony Ridge Creekdippers (2000). At its peak the festival included a diverse mix of two dozen local and national artists providing 10 hours of music on three stages and was described as "Cincinnati's premiere music event of the fall." All the Fall Music Festivals took place at the historic 19th-century open-air museum; Heritage Village Museum in Sharon Woods Park and funds raised by the events went to the restoration, upkeep and historical interpretation of the village. The charm added by the location was noted in the Chicago-based webzine Phantom Tollbooth, "After experiencing a folk festival in this atmosphere (and only shelling out $15), how could one go back to an auditorium? The event is well worth the drive from Detroit, Chicago or your hometown."

The label has also held other events such as the Spring Songs Music Festival, and the Blue Jordan Records Christmas Show.

The label's 2008 house concert series, Living Room Shows, was named Best Intimate Concert Series in Cincinnati. The 2008 run will wrap up in December with a "Songwriters in the Round" Event.

== Releases ==
- The Uzzah Slip, Mike Helm 1996
- Late Last Night, Janet Pressley 1996
- Stone Soup, The Marshwiggles 1997
- Blue Jordan Live, Various artists 1998
- Wonder, Katie Reider 1998
- This Time, Gwendolyn Speaks 1998
- Yer Pal Mr. Snake In The Grass, Mike Helm 1998
- Tales from Thom Scarecrow, David Wolfenberger 1999
- Garden of Sound, Joshua Seurkamp 2000
- I Am Ready, Katie Reider 2000
- Defined, Wild Carrot 2000
- No Retakes, Katie Reider 2001
- World of the Satisfy'n Place, David Wolfenberger 2001
- Sunrise for Someone, 2002
- A Slave Left Dreaming, Joshua Seurkamp 2004
- Blue Jordan Sampler 2005, Various artists 2005
- Songs to Sing in a Cathedral at Advent, Janet Pressley 2005
- Portrait of Narcissus, David Wolfenberger 2006
- Sitting at Your Instrument, Sharon Udoh 2007
- Becoming Human, Brandon Dawson 2008
- Summer Lake Champion, Sunrise For Someone 2008
- Just Burned Upon the Page, David Wolfenberger 2008
- Kenwood Towne Centre, Maurice Mattei 2008
- We Raise Up Our Glasses, Mike Helm 2009
- Mauled, Maurice Mattei and The Tempers 2009
- Crowd Around the Mic, Wild Carrot 2009
