= Cover Magazine (album) =

Studio album by Giant Sand
- Released: March 18, 2002
- Labels: Thrill Jockey Records (US), Fire Records (UK) (2011 UK release)
- Producers: Craig Schumacher, Howe Gelb

Giant Sand chronology
Unsungglum (2001)	Cover Magazine (2002)	Infiltration of Dreams (2002)

Professional ratings
Review scores
Source	Rating
AllMusic	4/5 stars
Pitchfork	7.3/10.0

Cover Magazine is an album by the American band Giant Sand. It was released on Thrill Jockey Records on March 18, 2002. Eleven of the songs are covers.

== Track listing ==
1. "El Paso / Out on the Weekend" (Marty Robbins, Neil Young)
2. "Johnny Hit and Run Pauline" (Exene Cervenka, John Doe)
3. "Iron Man" (Geezer Butler, Tony Iommi, Ozzy Osbourne, Bill Ward)
4. "Human / Lovely Head" (Goldfrapp, Will Gregory, Locke, Norfolk)
5. "The Beat Goes On" (Sonny Bono)
6. "Plants and Rags" (Rob Ellis, PJ Harvey)
7. "Wayfaring Stranger / Fly Me to the Moon" (Ives, Bart Howard)
8. "Red Right Hand" (Nick Cave)
9. "King of the Road" (Roger Miller)
10. "I'm Leaving Now" (Johnny Cash)
11. "Blue Marble Girl" (Howe Gelb)
12. "The Inner Flame" (Rainer Ptacek)
13. "The Beat Goes On" (Sonny Bono)
14. "Summertime" (George Gershwin) (bonus track on 25th Anniversary Edition)
15. "The Pilgrim (Chapter 33)" (Kris Kristofferson) (bonus track on 25th Anniversary Edition)

=== Differences between LP and CD ===
The cover of the vinyl version lists all titles of the CD. However, only the first 10 titles appear on the record. When it was remastered and re-released in 2011, it was sold with a download card for the entire album (including bonus tracks) on mp3.

== Personnel ==
- Joey Burns - Upright Bass
- Aron Burtch - Drums
- Neko Case - Background vocals
- John Convertino - Percussion, Drums
- Saholy Diavolana - Guitar, Background vocals
- Jim Fairchild - Guitar, Bottle
- Howe Gelb - Bass, Guitar, Piano, Harp, Sound Effects, Vocals
- Sofie Albertsen Gelb - Background vocals
- Aaron Graham - Steel Guitar
- Michael Grimes - Upright Bass
- PJ Harvey - Vocals
- Kelly Hogan - Background vocals
- Nick Luca - Guitar
- Ari Posner - Congas
- Laureline Prod'homme - Bass, Backing Vocals
- Kevin Salem - Strings
- Noah Thomas - Trumpet
- Jacob Valenzuela - Trumpet
- Matt Ward - Piano, Vocals
