= Sings Some Ol' Songs =

Studio album by Victoria Williams
- Released: August 6, 2002
- Recorded: 1993–2002
- Genre: Vocal jazz
- Length: 35:19
- Language: English
- Label: Dualtone

Victoria Williams chronology
Water to Drink (2000)	Sings Some Ol' Songs (2002)	Victoria Williams & The Loose Band: Town Hall 1995 (2017)

Sings Some Ol' Songs is a 2002 studio album by American singer-songwriter Victoria Williams. It has received positive reviews from critics and as of 2026, it is her last new music.

== Reception ==
Editors at AllMusic rated this album 3 out of 5 stars, with critic MacKenzie Wilson writing that "Victoria Williams is a storyteller of her own kind who possesses a matchless whimsicality" and in these covers "Williams' peculiar vocal beauty comes alive" with a collection that is "absolutely lovely". An assessment in Billboard called this release "a fun treat for classic song lovers looking for new takes on old favorites" and "an interesting project overall that transports listeners to a simpler time". In No Depression, a review called this "a charming, fun, touching, old-fashioned record, the perfect soundtrack to when you're feeling both full of life and melancholy". At PopMatters, Jason McNeil called this work "not the stellar album one might expect from this gifted singer-songwriter, although a definite keeper".

In a review of Williams' career for Trouser Press by Ira Robins, Wif Stenger, and Floyd Eberhard, the publication states that this album improves on Williams' last release Water to Drink and characterizes it as "an agreeable spin for those whose taste runs to Norah Jones or Katharine Whalen". In Uncut, Sings Some Ol' Songs received 3 out of 5 stars for being "a romantic, star-canopied waltz through a cluster of timeless classics wrung from the rose-tinted golden dawn of Broadway and beyond" and Williams displaying an "awkward grace proves irresistible".

== Track listing ==
No.	Title	Lyrics	Music	Length
1.	"Moon River"	Johnny Mercer	Henry Mancini	3:18
2.	"Blue Skies"	Irving Berlin	Irving Berlin	2:23
3.	"And Roses and Roses"	Dorival Caymmi/Ray Gilbert	Dorival Caymmi/Ray Gilbert	2:30
4.	"Over the Rainbow"	E. Y. Harburg	Harold Arlen	3:59
5.	"My Funny Valentine"	Lorenz Hart	Richard Rodgers	2:51
6.	"Keep Sweeping Cobwebs Off the Moon"	Joe Young	Sam M. Lewis/Oscar Levant	3:02
7.	"I'm Old Fashioned"	Johnny Mercer	Jerome Kern	3:13
8.	"As Time Goes By"	Herman Hupfeld	Herman Hupfeld	3:07
9.	"Someone to Watch Over Me"	Howard Dietz/Ira Gershwin	George Gershwin	4:37
10.	"Mongoose"	Eden Ahbez	Eden Ahbez	1:39
11.	"Do You Know What It Means to Miss New Orleans?"	Louis Alter/Eddie DeLange	Louis Alter/Eddie DeLange	4:40

== Personnel ==
- Victoria Williams – harmonica on "Moon River", guitar on "Moon River" and "My Funny Valentine", kalimba on "Blue Skies", vocals, production, liner notes
- Lee Alexander – bass guitar on "And Rose and Roses"
- Gina R. Binkley – design
- Jon Birdsong – cornet on "Keep Sweeping Cobwebs off the Moon", "Mongoose", and "Do You Know What It Means to Miss New Orleans?"; tuba on "Keep Sweeping Cobwebs off the Moon" and "Mongoose"; piano on "Do You Know What It Means to Miss New Orleans?"
- Jon Christiansen – bass guitar on "Blue Skies", "Keep Sweeping Cobwebs off the Moon", and "Do You Know What It Means to Miss New Orleans?"; drums on "Keep Sweeping Cobwebs off the Moon"; bass drum on "Mongoose"
- Michael Dumas – audio engineering, mixing
- Paul Fox – production on "Over the Rainbow", "As Time Goes By", and "Someone to Watch Over Me"
- Danny Frankel – drums on "Moon River", "I'm Old Fashioned"; percussion on "Blue Skies", "And Rose and Roses", and "Keep Sweeping Cobwebs off the Moon"
- Joshua Grange – pedal steel guitar on "Moon River" and "I'm Old Fashioned", resonator guitar on "Moon River", piano on "I'm Old Fashioned", co-production
- Roxanne Hanes – photography
- Don Heffington – drums on "Do You Know What It Means to Miss New Orleans?"
- Petra Haden – violin on "And Rose and Roses", "Over the Rainbow", and "Someone to Watch Over Me"; viola on "Over the Rainbow"; backing vocals on "Someone to Watch Over Me"
- J. C. Hopkins – piano on "Mongoose", production on "Blue Skies", "And Rose and Roses", "Mongoose", and "Do You Know What It Means to Miss New Orleans?"
- Brian Kane – guitar on "Blue Skies", "And Rose and Roses", and "I'm Old Fashioned"; piano on "And Rose and Roses"; clarinet on "Keep Sweeping Cobwebs off the Moon", "Mongoose", and "Do You Know What It Means to Miss New Orleans?"; arrangement on "And Rose and Roses" and "Over the Rainbow"; co-production
- Charlie McGovern – audio engineering on "And Rose and Roses", mixing on "Mongoose" and "Do You Know What It Means to Miss New Orleans?", audio mastering at Wildlife Studios, Montara, California, United States
- Mark Olson – audio engineering on "Blue Skies", "Mongoose", and "Do You Know What It Means to Miss New Orleans?"
- David Pilch – bass guitar on "Moon River", "Over the Rainbow", "My Funny Valentine", "I'm Old Fashioned", "As Time Goes By", and "Someone to Watch Over Me"; cello on "Over the Rainbow"
- Tim Ray – piano on "Over the Rainbow", Wurlitzer electric piano on "As Time Goes By" and "Someone to Watch Over Me"
- Tammy Rogers – viola on "Someone to Watch Over Me"
- Chris Strother – photography
- Ed Thacker – audio engineering on "Over the Rainbow", "As Time Goes By", and "Someone to Watch Over Me"
- Sidney Maurice Williams – photography
- Francie Wong – photography

== See also ==
- List of 2002 albums
