= Swing the Statue! =

Studio album by Victoria Williams
- Released: June 1990
- Recorded: 1990
- Studios: Sunset Sound Factory, Hollywood, California
- Length: 43:58
- Label: Rough Trade
- Producers: Michael Blair, Victoria Williams

Victoria Williams chronology
Happy Come Home (1987)	Swing the Statue! (1990)	Loose (1994)

Professional ratings
Review scores
Source	Rating
AllMusic	4.5/5 stars
Chicago Tribune	3/4 stars
Christgau's Consumer Guide	(choice cut)
Encyclopedia of Popular Music	4/5 stars
MusicHound Rock	3.5/5 stars
Select	4/5
Spin Alternative Record Guide	6/10

Swing the Statue! is the second album by American singer/songwriter Victoria Williams, released in 1990 by Rough Trade Records.

== Background ==
Williams’ debut, 1987's Happy Come Home, received some good critical reviews but made zero commercial impact, selling only fourteen thousand copies. Her original label Geffen was unimpressed by the nonexistent sales and dropped Victoria, after she fired her manager by mail. Early in 1989 her marriage to Peter Case also fell apart.

After her split with Geffen, Victoria would record “Don't Let It Bring You Down” for the Neil Young tribute album The Bridge. She would record her second album in four days early in 1990, focusing on the more joyful of the dozens of songs she had written over the three years since the debut album.

Williams would sign with Rough Trade Records early in 1990, as one of that label's last ever signings. Despite many positive critical reviews, the collapse of Rough Trade would mean Swing the Statue! fared even worse commercially that its predecessor, selling a mere eleven thousand copies.

== Reception ==
Trouser Press said, "Williams sounds like she's in control here. Her often-remarkable lyrics can be heard this time, and her rangy voice — an intoxicating blend of little-girl breathiness and old- lady crackle and wisdom that is definitely an acquired taste — is well out front. There are a few annoying moments, but songs like the wry, chilling "Summer of Drugs" memoir triumphantly unveil Williams' personal vision."

== Track listing ==
All tracks are written by Victoria Williams, unless otherwise noted.

No.	Title	Writer(s)	Length
1.	"Why Look at the Moon"		2:30
2.	"Boogieman"		3:50
3.	"Clothesline Song"/"Swing Little Girl"	"Swing Little Girl" – Charlie Chaplin	4:32
4.	"Tarbelly and Featherfoot"		4:30
5.	"On Time"		3:12
6.	"Holy Spirit"		4:38
7.	"Summer of Drugs"		4:50
8.	"I Can't Cry Hard Enough"	David Williams, Marvin Etzioni	3:38
9.	"Wobbling"		3:15
10.	"Vieux Amis"		2:10
11.	"Weeds"		3:36
12.	"Lift Him Up"	Traditional	3:17

== Personnel ==
- Victoria Williams – vocals, acoustic guitar, piano, dulcimer
- Willie Aron – electric and acoustic guitar, organ, backing vocals
- Andrew Williams – acoustic guitar
- Don Falzone – upright double bass, acoustic bass
- Marty Rifkin – pedal steel guitar
- Steven Soles – mandolin, trombone
- Byron Berline – fiddle, mandolin
- John Philip Shenale – Hammond organ, Kurzweil horns
- Michael Blair – drums, Chinese drums, marimba, cowbell, vibraphone, glockenspiel, accordion, organ pedals, washboard, checkerbox, tambourine, backing vocals
- David Williams – piano, backing vocals
- Melissa Hasin – cello on "Wobbling"
- Buddy Miller – vocals, guitar on "Lift Him Up"
- Julie Miller – vocals on "Lift Him Up"
