= Christopher Rees =

British musician

Christopher Rees (born 2 May 1973, Llanelli, South Wales, UK) is a musician, singer-songwriter, music producer.

Christopher Rees live at the Thekla, Bristol, in October 2006

== Career ==
Rees started his music career by touring the United States in 1994, having developed his guitar playing and songwriting talents at Cardiff University.

Rees released the 'Kiss Me Kill Me' EP via FFvinyl in 2001, receiving a Welsh Music Award nomination for 'Best Male Solo Act' two years running in 2002 and 2003. He supported former Velvet Underground singer John Cale during a 2001 UK tour.

He established the Red Eye Music label with fellow musician Dave Stapleton in 2003 and released his debut album 'The Sweetest Ache' in October 2004. The album received widespread critical acclaim for its musical ambition and dramatic intensity.

In Oct 2004 he became the first act ever to perform at The Houses Of Parliament, Port Cullis House as part of Fergal Sharkey's Live Music Forum. The Sweetest Ache also earned him the title of Best Male Solo Artist at The Welsh Music Awards 2004.

His second album Alone on a Mountain Top (The Ty Bach Twt Sessions) was released in June 2005. It had support from MOJO, UNCUT and Janice Long on BBC Radio 2 as well as opening the doors to international touring. The album was distributed throughout Canada, Benelux and New Zealand where Rees toured.

The third album by Christopher Rees 'Cautionary Tales' was released on 3 September 2007. The album garnered critical acclaim throughout the UK and Europe, radio play on BBC Radio 2 (Janice Long, Steve Lamacq, Bob Harris). The single Bottom Dollar (Featuring Victoria Williams) hit Number 2 in the MOJO Playlist in October 2007 (Issue 167).

It also opened the door to some wider touring activities including appearances at The Green Man Festival, End of the Road Festival and supports slots with Richard Hawley and Texas Country singer Billy Joe Shaver.

Rees appeared at music festivals such as North By North East in Toronto, Canada and South By South West Music Festival in Austin, Texas.

Rees released his fourth album 'Devil's Bridge' on 11 May 2009. He was invited to tour nationwide with performers including Kristin Hersh (Throwing Muses), The Handsome Family, Chuck Prophet, Steve Earle, Cherryholmes and The Sadies.

Rees released his 5th album 'Heart on Fire' in May 2011. The album was partly recorded in Austin, Texas with The South Austin Horns.

Rees released his 6th album, 'Stand Fast' on 18 February 2013. The album features the song 'Alright Squires' – a tribute to Welsh singer Dorothy Squires.

His 7th album 'The Nashville Songs' was released 30 June 2017.

== Discography ==
=== Singles ===
- "Kiss Me Kill Me EP" (2001)
- "Bottom Dollar" (2007)
- "What Walks Outside My Window" (2009)
- "Sparks Flying" (2011)

=== Albums ===
- The Sweetest Ache (2004)
- Alone on a Mountain Top (The Tŷ Bach Twt Sessions) (2005)
- Cautionary Tales (2007)
- Devil's Bridge (2009)
- Heart on Fire (2011)
- Stand Fast (2013)
- The Nashville Songs (2017)

== Awards ==
- 2004 – Best Male Solo Artist – Welsh Music Awards
- 2011 – MOJO Honours List – New Voice Award (Shortlist)
