= Electric Eye (album) =

Studio album by Prodigal
- Released: 1984
- Genre: Christian rock, new wave
- Label: Heartland Records
- Producer: Jon Phelps

Prodigal chronology
Prodigal (1982)	Electric Eye (1984)	Just Like Real Life (1985)

Electric Eye is the second studio album by the Christian rock band Prodigal, released in 1984.

The band created promotional music videos for "Scene of the Crime", "Fast Forward", and "Boxes", which were featured on Trinity Broadcasting Network's music video show Real Videos at the time of the album's release.

In a 2009 interview, frontman Loyd Boldman said "we put a 'stop-groove' at the end of Side Two that would 'catch' the vinyl record and wouldn't allow it to eject on an automatic turntable. If you picked up the needle and set it down again on the other side of the stop-groove, you’d hear a packet of computer code that could be deciphered by a Commodore 64, the most popular computer of that time. If you used a cassette drive, the Commodore would show you lyrics and graphics and some facts about the album." In 2019, it was demonstrated that the contents were a short BASIC program displaying a quote by Albert Einstein and a quote by Jesus.

Perfection of means and confusion of ends seem to characterize our age.

— Albert Einstein

Peace I leave with you, My peace I give to you: not as the world gives, give I to you. Let not your heart be troubled, neither let it be afraid.

— Jesus Christ

== Track listing ==
Side one
No.	Title	Writer(s)	Lead Vocals	Length
1.	"Scene of the Crime"	Lloyd Boldman	Boldman	4:44
2.	"Fast Forward"	Boldman	Rick Fields	4:43
3.	"Masks"	Boldman	Boldman	4:05
4.	"Just What I Need"	Dave Workman	Workman, Boldman	3:08
5.	"Emerald City"	Boldman	Workman	3:23

Side two
No.	Title	Writer(s)	Lead Vocals	Length
1.	"Electric Eye"	Boldman	Boldman	5:00
2.	"Bobby"	Boldman	Fields	3:18
3.	"Shout It Out"	Boldman	Boldman	3:25
4.	"Neon"	Boldman	Boldman	5:15
5.	"Boxes"	Workman	Workman	3:35

"Boxes" fades into a verse of the early 20th-century hymn "Turn Your Eyes Upon Jesus", sung by producer Jon Phelps. This track is listed on the inner sleeve but not on the record label or album jacket.

== Band members ==
- Loyd Boldman: Keyboards, vocals
- Dave Workman: Drums, vocals
- Rick Fields: Guitars, saxophones, vocals
- Mike Wilson: Bass guitar

== Production ==
- Producer: Jon Phelps
- Recording engineer: Greg McNeily:
- Engineers: Rytt Hershburg, Brad Kuenning, Paul Thompson
- Mixer: Gary Platt
- Mastering: Mike Fuller
