= Just Like Real Life =

Studio album by Prodigal
- Released: 1985
- Genre: Christian rock, new wave
- Label: Heartland Records
- Producer: Gary Platt

Prodigal chronology
Electric Eye (1984)	Just Like Real Life (1985)

Just Like Real Life is the third and final studio album by the Christian rock band Prodigal, released in 1985.

The band created promotional music videos for "Future Now" and "Jump Cut," which were featured on Trinity Broadcasting Network's music video show Real Videos at the time of the album's release.

== Track listing ==
Side one
No.	Title	Writer(s)	Lead Vocals	Length
1.	"Future Now"	Loyd Boldman	Boldman	3:55
2.	"Push and Shove"	Dave Workman	Workman	3:00
3.	"Safety in Numbers"	Workman	Rick Fields	2:52
4.	"Answering Machine"	Boldman	Boldman	3:57
5.	"Under the Gun"	Workman	Fields, Workman	3:47

Side two
No.	Title	Writer(s)	Lead Vocals	Length
1.	"Jump Cut (Just Like Real Life)"	Boldman, Fields	Boldman	3:14
2.	"Incommunicado"	Workman	Workman	2:50
3.	"Next Big Thing"	Boldman	Boldman	2:44
4.	"Burn It Up"	Boldman	Boldman	3:16
5.	"The Big Sleep"	Boldman	Boldman	3:16
6.	"Just Make Up Your Mind"	Workman	Workman	3:13

== Band members ==
- Loyd Boldman: Keyboards, vocals
- Dave Workman: Drums, vocals
- Rick Fields: Guitars, vocals
- Mike Wilson: Bass guitar

== Other personnel ==
- Wes Boatman: Synthesizer programming

== Production ==
- Executive producer: Jon Phelps
- Producer and engineer: Gary Platt
- Assistant engineer: Steve Moller
- Mastering: Mike Fuller
