= Loose (Victoria Williams album) =

Studio album by Victoria Williams
- Released: October 18, 1994
- Recorded: American, Woodland Hills, California
- Genres: Country rock, folk, alternative rock
- Length: 60:20
- Labels: Atlantic; Mammoth
- Producer: Paul Fox

Victoria Williams chronology
| Swing the Statue! (1990) | Loose (1994) | This Moment: In Toronto with the Loose Band (1996) |

Loose is the third studio album by American singer/songwriter Victoria Williams, released in 1994.

== Background and recording ==
Her previous album, 1990’s Swing the Statue!, won some critical praise but completely failed to attract commercial attention, and the collapse of Rough Trade Records left her without a contract until Mammoth Records bought the rights to that album. Two years afterwards, Williams was diagnosed with multiple sclerosis and as a working musician, lacked health insurance or the money to pay her medical fees; however, a large number of musicians who admired the talent she had shown on her Geffen Records albums came in to support her with 1993’s Sweet Relief: A Benefit for Victoria Williams tribute album recording her songs – including two unrecorded by Williams herself.

Loose, in contrast to her first two albums, was recorded with a large crew including some high-profile contributors like R.E.M.’s Mike Mills, Sly Stone’s sister and bandmate Rose, husband-to-be Mark Olson and Soul Asylum’s Dave Pirner. Containing a full hour of music, Loose saw Victoria Williams use a greater diversity of styles, notably the spiritual-influenced "You R Loved" and "Get Away".

== Reception ==
Professional ratings
Review scores
| Source | Rating |
|---|---|
| AllMusic | 4.5/5 stars |
| Chicago Sun-Times | 3.5/4 stars |
| Chicago Tribune | 3.5/4 stars |
| Entertainment Weekly | A− |
| Los Angeles Times | 4/4 stars |
| NME | 8/10 |
| Q | 3/5 stars |
| Rolling Stone | 4/5 stars |
| The Rolling Stone Album Guide | 4/5 stars |
| The Village Voice | A− |

Despite widespread critical praise, Loose could not break her commercially, failing to dent the Billboard Top 200, and Williams moved with new husband Olson to Joshua Tree, California.

Josh Jackson of Paste wrote: "There's a tenderness and fragility to these tracks that fits [...] with her idiosyncratic lyrics, filled with an emotional depth, whether she's singing about her dog, her grandfather, her crazy childhood neighbor or her soon-to-be husband, or just letting you know You R Loved." Trouser Press called it "a sublime masterpiece positively glowing with love and good feelings. Even when she's ruing the death of beloved friends, Williams can only express her joy at the experience of knowing such fine folks." AllMusic agreed. "There is joy and more joy in the proceedings. But it is more than that. Inside the sound of Williams' unusual yet glorious voice is the sound of gratitude."

== Track listing ==
All tracks are written by Victoria Williams, except where otherwise noted.

| No. | Title | Writer(s) | Length |
|---|---|---|---|
| 1. | "Century Plant" | | 4:50 |
| 2. | "You R Loved" | | 4:24 |
| 3. | "Harry Went to Heaven" | | 2:49 |
| 4. | "Crazy Mary" | | 5:15 |
| 5. | "When We Sing Together" | | 2:43 |
| 6. | "Polish Those Shoes" | | 5:06 |
| 7. | "Love" | | 3:45 |
| 8. | "What a Wonderful World" | Bob Thiele, George David Weiss | 2:49 |
| 9. | "Waterfall" | | 3:10 |
| 10. | "Nature’s Way" | Randy California | 2:24 |
| 11. | "Sunshine Country" | | 3:45 |
| 12. | "Happy to Have Known Pappy" | | 3:13 |
| 13. | "My Ally" | Victoria Williams, Dave Pirner | 3:33 |
| 14. | "Hitchhikers’ Smile" | | 4:33 |
| 15. | "Get Away" | | 4:41 |
| 16. | "Psalms" | Don Heffington | 3:20 |
| Total length: | | | 60:20 |

== Personnel ==
- Scott Babcock – timpani, shaker
- Peter Buck – electric guitar, sitar
- Greg Cohen – acoustic bass, electric guitar
- Paul Fox – chimes, shaker
- The Richard Greene Fourteen – strings
- Lili Haydn – viola
- Don Heffington – drums, percussion
- Rami Jaffee – organ
- Greg Leisz – electric guitar, pedal steel guitar, mandolin, acoustic guitar, dulcimer
- Gary Louris – backing vocals
- Jean McClain – backing vocals
- Mike Mills – backing vocals
- Mark Olson – vocals, acoustic guitar
- Van Dyke Parks – accordion, arrangements
- Dave Pirner – vocals
- Tim Ray – piano, electric piano
- Tammy Rogers – violin, viola, backing vocals
- Rose Stone – backing vocals
- Geri Stuyak – cello
- Tower of Power Horn Section – horns
- Doug Weisselman – clarinet, bass harmonica, clay flute
- Andrew Williams – acoustic guitar, piano, organ, backing vocals
- David Williams – backing vocals
- Victoria Williams – vocals, electric guitar, acoustic guitar, piano, dulcimer

== Charts ==
Chart performance for Loose
| Chart (1995) | Peak position |
|---|---|
| US Heatseeker Albums (Billboard) | 40 |
