= Water to Drink (album) =

Studio album by Victoria Williams
- Released: 2000
- Label: Atlantic
- Producer: Victoria Williams, J. C. Hopkins

Victoria Williams chronology
Musings of a Creek Dipper (1998)	Water to Drink (2000)	Sings Some Ol' Songs (2002)

Water to Drink is an album by the American musician Victoria Williams, released in 2000. She had originally intended to record an album of standards, but was discouraged by Atlantic Records. Williams promoted the album by touring with Lou Reed.

== Production ==
Produced by Williams and J. C. Hopkins, the album was recorded mostly at Williams's home studio, in Joshua Tree. The title track was written by Antônio Carlos Jobim. Williams used a kalimba on some of the tracks. Van Dyke Parks composed the string parts for some songs. Greg Leisz played pedal steel on the album; David Piltch played bass. Mark Olson, Williams's then-husband, sang on "Joy of Love". Petra Haden sang and played violin on several tracks. "Junk" employs a Mellotron; "Gladys and Lucy" a horn section.

== Critical reception ==
Professional ratings
Review scores
Source	Rating
AllMusic	4/5 stars
The Atlanta Constitution	B+
Birmingham Post	4/5 stars
Entertainment Weekly	B
The Gazette	3/5 stars
Los Angeles Times	3.5/4 stars
Orange County Register	B+
Rolling Stone	3.5/5 stars
Spin	8/10

Entertainment Weekly noted that "Williams has a strange, little-girl voice that channels big emotions and annoys small-minded quirkophobes." The Atlanta Constitution wrote that Williams has "tamed the wilder edges of her oddball compositions so that her shambling country-gospel-pop sound has steeped into something you might call homespun jazz." Spin praised Haden's "shimmering backing vocals." Rolling Stone concluded: "Both homespun and hymnlike, the songs on Water to Drink are the fullest expression yet of Williams' cockeyed genius."

The Los Angeles Times opined that Williams "is among the least jaded contemporary songwriters, a chronicler of the incidental moments that transform the prosaic into the transcendent." The Hartford Courant determined that "her cutesy turn on 'Claude' has her sounding like a nails-on-chalkboard version of Carol Channing." The Gazette called Water to Drink "a crazy quilt of musical styles all stitched together with waif-like vocals." The Irish Times determined that, "at her best her music evokes the richness of southern American rural culture, intimate reflections packaged in delightful light folksy melodies."

AllMusic wrote that "the constraints of performing another composer's songs tone down the blur of her ideas, giving her space where she can spread out and share her immense talent."

== Track listing ==
All tracks are written by Victoria Williams, unless otherwise noted.

No.	Title	Writer(s)	Length
1.	"Grandma's Hat Pin"		4:08
2.	"Gladys and Lucy"		3:42
3.	"Water to Drink"	Antônio Carlos Jobim/Vinícius de Moraes	3:08
4.	"Light the Lamp Freddie"		4:09
5.	"Claude"		4:03
6.	"Joy of Love"		4:46
7.	"Until the Real Thing Comes Along"	Sammy Cahn/Saul Chaplin/L.E. Freeman/Mann Holiner/Alberta Nichols	4:42
8.	"Lagniappe"		3:56
9.	"Junk"		4:33
10.	"Little Bird"		3:09
11.	"Young at Heart"	Carolyn Leigh/Johnny Richards	3:49
12.	"Little Bit of Love"		3:56
