= Swerve (album) =

Studio album by Giant Sand
- Released: 1990
- Genre: Rock
- Length: 47:39
- Labels: Amazing Giant Sand (original US release), Restless (1993 US reissue), Demon (original UK release), Fire (2010 UK reissue)

Giant Sand chronology
Long Stem Rant (1989)	Swerve (1990)	Ramp (1991)

Swerve is an album by Tucson, Arizona-based rock band Giant Sand. It was first released in 1990 on the Amazing Black Sand label, and was re-released in 1993 by both Amazing Black Sand and Restless Records. It features performances by guest artists such as Chris Cacavas of Green on Red, Juliana Hatfield, and Steve Wynn. Its music has been described as "Sticky Fingers country-rock".

Professional ratings
Review scores
Source	Rating
AllMusic	4/5 stars
Chicago Tribune	3/4 stars
Christgau's Consumer Guide	(neither)
The Encyclopedia of Popular Music	3/5 stars
Entertainment Weekly	A–

== Track listing ==
1. Can't Find Love
2. Swerver
3. Sisters + Brothers
4. Swerving
5. Some Kind Of
6. Trickle Down System
7. Dream Stay
8. Former Version of Ourselves
9. Angels at Night
10. Every Grain of Sand
11. Swervette
12. Final Swerve
