= Center of the Universe (album) =

Studio album by Giant Sand
- Released: 1992
- Genre: Rock
- Label: Restless
- Producer: Giant Sand

Giant Sand chronology
Ramp (1991)	Center of the Universe (1992)	Purge & Slouch (1993)

Center of the Universe is an album by the American band Giant Sand, released in 1992. It was the first Giant Sand album to receive wide distribution and a traditional promotional campaign. It was also the band's first album for Restless Records, which had rereleased a couple of older Giant Sand albums. The band supported Center of the Universe with a North American tour.

== Production ==
Recorded in Venice, California, the album was produced by the band; they did not want a traditional producer suggesting or correcting musical ideas. Giant Sand entered the studio with songs for half an album, and had to finish the rest of the songs during the sessions. Many of the songs are about characters on the fringes of society. Vicki Peterson and Susan Cowsill, credited as the Psycho Sisters, provided backing vocals on some of the tracks. Victoria Williams contributed vocals to the title track.

== Critical reception ==
Professional ratings
Review scores
Source	Rating
AllMusic	4/5 stars
Robert Christgau	(1-star Honorable Mention)
The Encyclopedia of Popular Music	3/5 stars
Spin Alternative Record Guide	8/10

The Philadelphia Inquirer noted that "leader Howe Gelb continues to write ragged songs that refuse to adhere to a narrative track." Robert Christgau praised "Thing Like That" and the title track. Trouser Press said that "the heads-down rockism of the loud'n'proud Center of the Universe is clearly descended from Crazy Horse, particularly when Convertino and bassist Joey Burns lock into a groove as primordial as the one that propels the harsh 'Seeded ('tween Bone and Bark)'." The Washington Post deemed it a "post-punk version of country-rock."

USA Today noted that the band "embraces both pop structure and punk abandon." Spin determined that the album "opens with an explosion of pointy guitar noise worthy of the meanest Lower East Side cluster-hunch, and coalesces into a wide brainful of songs describing the world as seen from the window of a mobile home falling through deep space." The Vancouver Sun opined that "Gelb songs sound likes he's using guitar strings about the size of trans-Atlantic cable, plucked with chunks of floor tile and sung in a borderline psychotic drawl."

AllMusic wrote that Giant Sand "assays another fascinating set of desert-fried rock & roll, serving up one winner after another on this excellent album."

== Track listing ==
No.	Title	Length
1.	"Seeded ('tween Bone and Bark)"
2.	"Pathfinder"
3.	"Center of the Universe"
4.	"Off Ramp Man"
5.	"Year of the Dog"
6.	"Live to Tell"
7.	"Thrust"
8.	"Loretta and the Insect World"
9.	"Sonic Drive In"
10.	"Milkshake Girl"
11.	"Stuck"
12.	"Thing Like That"
13.	"Return to Fodder"
14.	"Unwed and Well Sped"
15.	"Solomon's Ride"
