= Giant Sand =

American band

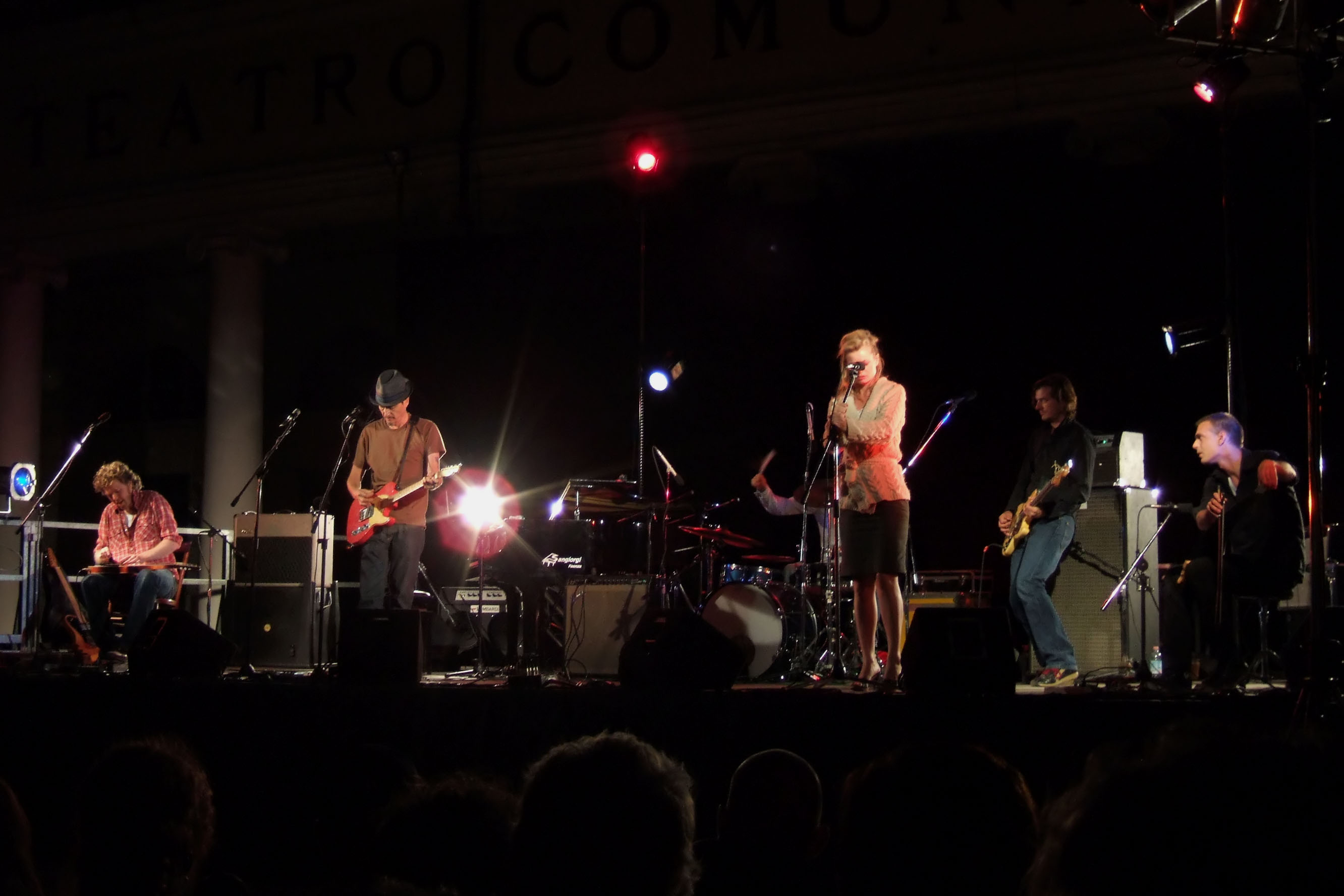
- Giant Sand performing in Faenza, Italy in 2006

Background information
- Also known as: Giant Sandworms, Giant Giant Sand
- Origin: Tucson, Arizona
- Genres: Alternative rock, Americana, roots rock, alternative country
- Years active: 1980–present
- Labels: Fire; Loose Music
- Members: Howe Gelb; Tom Larkins; Nick Augustine; Thøger T. Lund; Anders Pedersen; Peter Dombernowsky; Nicolaj Heyman; Brian Lopez; Gabriel Sullivan; Jon Villa; Iris Jakobsen; Asger Christensen; Maggie Björklund; Lonna Kelley
- Past members: John Convertino; Joey Burns; Rainer Ptacek; Chris Cacavas; Paula Jean Brown; Iain Shedden; Andrew Collberg; Billy Sedlmayr
- Website: giantsandmusic.bandcamp.com

Giant Sand (formerly Giant Sandworms) is an American musical group from Tucson, Arizona. Its most constant member is singer-songwriter Howe Gelb. The groups have developed idiosyncratic sound rooted in alternative country, but touching on a wide range of other styles and featuring Gelb's beatnik-influenced vocals and songwriting. Since about 2012, they have also performed as Giant Giant Sand when featuring a larger ensemble than their traditional four to six musicians.

== History ==
Howe Gelb, also a prolific solo artist, started the group as Giant Sandworms in the late 1970s in Tucson, Arizona. In 1980, an EP was released entitled Will Wallow and Roam After the Ruin. After which Gelb sacked the other members. 1983 saw the release of Valley of Rain on Enigma Records with the shortened name of Giant Sand. It had Scott Garber on bass, Winston Watson on drums for most tracks, with Tommy Larkins drumming on the others. By 1990, John Convertino had become the band's drummer. Multi-instrumentalist Joey Burns joined around that time. Convertino and Burns formed Calexico in 1996, later leaving the group to concentrate on that project. In 2004, saw the first release without Convertino and Burns; the Is All Over the Map album.

== Members ==
Members have included keyboardist Chris Cacavas (of Green on Red), bassist Paula Jean Brown (who was briefly a member of The Go-Go's and was married to Gelb at the time), Mark Walton (of The Dream Syndicate and Continental Drifters), drummer Tom Larkins (later to become a Jonathan Richman sideman) who rejoined Giant Sand in 2019 (without quitting Richman's band), and Iain Shedden, drummer with Australian band The Saints. For a long while the band's rhythm section consisted of John Convertino and Joey Burns. In the early 2000s Howe Gelb reinvented the band again – this time with players from Denmark.

Guest artists over the last three decades have included Victoria Williams, Neko Case, Juliana Hatfield, PJ Harvey, Vic Chesnutt, Steve Wynn, Vicki Peterson, Rainer Ptacek, M. Ward, Isobel Campbell, Ilse DeLange of The Common Linnets, nearly all members of the band Poi Dog Pondering, and Indiosa Patsy Jean (Gelb and Brown's daughter).

== Discography ==
=== Giant Sand ===
- 1985: Valley of Rain (Enigma Records)
- 1986: Ballad of a Thin Line Man (Zippo)
- 1988: Storm (What Goes On)
- 1988: The Love Songs (Homestead)
- 1989: Giant Sandwich (Homestead)
- 1989: Long Stem Rant (Homestead)
- 1990: Swerve (Demon)
- 1991: Ramp (Restless/Rough Trade)
- 1992: Center of the Universe (Restless)
- 1993: Purge & Slouch (Brake Out)
- 1993: Stromausfall (Return to Sender)
- 1994: Glum (Imago)
- 1995: Goods and Services (Brake Out)
- 1995: Backyard Barbecue Broadcast (Koch)
- 1997: Official Bootleg Series Volume 1: Build Your Own Night It's Easy (¡Epiphany!)
- 2000: Chore of Enchantment (Loose)
- 2000: Official Bootleg Series Volume 2: The Rock Opera Years (OW OM Finished Recorded Products)
- 2001: Official Bootleg Series Volume 3: Unsungglum (OW OM Finished Recorded Products)
- 2001: Selections Circa 1990–2000 (V2 Records Benelux)
- 2002: Cover Magazine (Thrill Jockey)
- 2002: Infiltration of Dreams (Mucchio Extra)
- 2003: Official Bootleg Series Volume 5: Too Many Spare Parts in the Yard Too Close at Hand (OW OM Recorded Products)
- 2004: Is All Over the Map (Thrill Jockey)
- 2008: *proVISIONS* (Thrill Jockey)
- 2008: Provisional Supplement (OW OM Recorded Products)
- 2010: Blurry Blue Mountain (Fire)
- 2015: Heartbreak Pass (New West)
- 2018: Returns To Valley Of Rain (Fire)
- 2019: Recounting The Ballads Of Thin Line Men (Fire)

=== Giant Giant Sand ===
- 2012: Tucson: a Country Rock Opera (Fire)
- 2016: Return to Tucson (Fire)

=== Melted Wires ===
- 2010 Melted Wires (self-released)

=== Howe Gelb ===
- 2011: Snarl Some Piano (Scatterland)

== Filmography ==
- "Good Luck Suckers" Giant Sand's concert at the Trabendo in Paris – France 2016

Editing in DVD with the documentary "Sounds of Tucson" – Director Guillaume Dero – La Huit.

- Score for Ingenius (2011) – feature film with Jeremy Renner (Bleiberg Distribution)
- High and Dry: Where the Desert Meets Rock and Roll (2006) – a documentary about Tucson musicians which includes music and interviews with Giant Sand members
- Drunken Bees (1996) – a documentary about Giant Sand by Marianne Dissard.
