= Wild Carrot (band) =

American singer-songwriter

Wild Carrot is an American Roots music duo from Cincinnati, Ohio. With a foot in traditional American music, their repertoire branches in diverse directions: from award-winning original tunes to swing, blues and traditional songs, using guitar, mandolin, dulcimer, concertina, and vocals. The group is made up primarily of husband and wife Pam Temple and Spencer Funk. With additional instrumentation and vocals they expand to “Wild Carrot and Their Roots Band”, performing as a trio, quartet or larger group.

In 2003 and again in 2006 the duo was selected by the U.S. Embassy in Santiago, Chile to represent the United States as Cultural Ambassadors to Chile. Their visit included performances at Expoinglés, a Santiago festival that promotes English as a second language in Chile and celebrates the cultures of several English-speaking countries.

The sound of the group has at times drawn comparison to folk duos, but Wild Carrot has a sound all their own. Temple provides the songs, soprano vocals, and guitar accompaniment, while Funk adds fingerstyle guitar, mandolin, and harmony vocals. On recordings they have been joined by Don Porterfield (bass), Chris Rosser (percussion & vocals), and others, including Brandt Smith and Brenda Wolfersberger. Their 2008 recording, I've Heard That Song Before, is a collaboration with pianist Hank Ross (Red Onion Jazz Band) and features many of the swing standards the duo regularly performs in a more traditional jazz setting. In 2011, they released Crowd Around the Mic: Live, recorded over two live performances and funded largely by fan contributions. The intimacy of the performance translates to the disc with all the charm that characterizes their shows and their music in general.

When they are not touring, Funk also teaches private guitar and mandolin lessons and Temple is an on-air music host for NPR affiliate WNKU, which serves Greater Cincinnati, Dayton, and Portsmouth, Ohio.

== Awards and honors ==
• Two-time Cultural Ambassadors to Chile, South America with the U.S. State Department.

• Finalists for the prestigious Kerrville New Folk songwriting contest.

• Winners of the Walnut Valley New Songs Showcase for Folk.

• Named Best Folk Act and nominated for Artist of the Year by the Cincinnati Entertainment Awards.

• Wild Carrot has received training from The Kennedy Center for the Arts, specializing in integrating the arts into school curriculum through specialized performances and songwriting workshops.

== Discography ==
- Defined (2000, Falling Mountain Music)
- Hope (2003, Falling Mountain/Chocolate Dog Music)
- I've Heard That Song Before (2008, Falling Mountain Music/Chocolate Dog Music)
- Crowd Around the Mic: Live (2011, Chocolate Dog Music/Blue Jordan Records)
