= Musings of a Creek Dipper =

Studio album by Victoria Williams
- Released: 1998
- Label: Atlantic
- Producers: Victoria Williams, Trina Shoemaker

Victoria Williams chronology
| This Moment: In Toronto with the Loose Band (1995) | Musings of a Creek Dipper (1998) | Water to Drink (2000) |

Musings of a Creek Dipper is an album by the American musician Victoria Williams, released in 1998. The album cover artwork is a photograph of Williams in an Oxnard, California, creek. Williams supported the album with a short tour, which included playing the Calgary Folk Music Festival.

== Production ==
Musings of a Creek Dipper was produced by Williams and Trina Shoemaker. Joey Burns and John Convertino played on the album, as did Greg Leisz. Williams employed more horns and strings than on previous albums. She experienced occasional flareups of her multiple sclerosis during the recording sessions.

Many of the album's songs were inspired by living near Joshua Tree, California. Williams's husband, Mark Olson, cowrote some of the songs and also played on the album. Wendy & Lisa provided much of the musical instrumentation to "Train Song (Demise of the Caboose)". The vocals on "Kashmir's Corn" were recorded with Williams's head positioned in the bell of a sousaphone. "Humming Bird" first appeared on The Original Harmony Ridge Creek Dippers. Julie Miller sang on "Rainmaker". "Nature Boy" is a cover of the Nat King Cole song.

== Critical reception ==
Professional ratings
Review scores
| Source | Rating |
|---|---|
| AllMusic | 3/5 stars |
| Chicago Tribune | 2/4 stars |
| Robert Christgau | A− |
| The Encyclopedia of Popular Music | 4/5 stars |
| Entertainment Weekly | A− |
| The Hamilton Spectator | 4/4 stars |
| The Indianapolis Star | 3/4 stars |
| MusicHound Rock: The Essential Album Guide | 3.5/5 stars |
| (The New) Rolling Stone Album Guide | 4/5 stars |
| Spin | 7/10 |

Robert Christgau wrote that "there's eccentric and then there's loopy, and this fragile, well-named follow-up is loopy." Trouser Press thought that "the album's relaxed pace rests the singer comfortably in her own jazz-folk niche, and she has never sounded more at home." The Boston Globe stated: "High and quavery as a child at points, her Melanie-like voice makes even her most sophisticated songs sound as simple as a sing-along." The Chicago Tribune opined that "too often Williams sounds like Olive Oyl at a twee party."

Entertainment Weekly determined that "what's truly remarkable about these songs is how they manage to radiate a sense of wonder without sounding cloyingly precious." Spin concluded that Williams "is unapologetic about her lazy pace and sappy disposition, spinning take-it-or-leave-it tales of cozy cabins and pretty clouds." The Hamilton Spectator noted that, "by providing an atmosphere conducive to Williams' charms, Shoemaker ... has produced a bewitching, gratifying record that finally capitalizes on the singer's unique gifts."

AllMusic wrote that Williams "expands her musical skills on Musings of a Creekdipper, finding an original, eclectically rural sound that enhances the off-center originality of her songs."

== Track listing ==
All tracks are written by Victoria Williams, unless otherwise noted.

| No. | Title | Writer(s) | Length |
|---|---|---|---|
| 1. | "Periwinkle Sky" | | 3:08 |
| 2. | "Rainmaker" | | 3:26 |
| 3. | "Kashmir's Corn" | | 4:24 |
| 4. | "Train Song (Demise of the Caboose)" | | 3:05 |
| 5. | "Last Word" | | 3:17 |
| 6. | "Nature Boy" | Eden Ahbez | 2:39 |
| 7. | "Tree Song (Eucalyptus Lullabye)" | | 4:18 |
| 8. | "Let It Be So" | | 3:28 |
| 9. | "Allergic Boy" | | 3:00 |
| 10. | "Humming Bird" | Victoria Williams/Mark Olson | 3:17 |
| 11. | "Grandpa in the Cornpatch" | | 4:23 |
| 12. | "Blackbirds Rise" | | 4:25 |
