= Robert Deeble =

American singer-songwriter

Robert Deeble is an American singer-songwriter. Originally from Long Beach, California, he is now based in Seattle. His recordings have been noted for their orchestrated arrangements, a subtle, minimalist style of production, and lyrical content. Deeble's album, Beloved, was released on March 30, 2018. His most recent single, "Pleasure to Burn", was released in May 2019 and was inspired by the novel Fahrenheit 451.

== Collaborations ==
Deeble's first album, Days Like These, featured a duet with folk heroine Victoria Williams on the song "Rockabye". Subsequent recordings included such music industry veterans as Rachel Blumberg of the Decemberists, Tomo Nakayama of Grand Hallway, cellist Melissa Hasin,; vocalists Anna-Lynne Williams, Jen Wood and Shenandoah Davis, and drummer Stephen Hodges. He has toured throughout the US and New Zealand.

== Albums ==
Deeblehas released six full-length albums in 21 years. 2018's Beloved follows a six-year hiatus, as did the previous release, Heart Like Feathers.

- Beloved (2018)
- Heart Like Feathers (2012)
- This Bar Has No One Left (2005)
- Thirteen Stories (2003)
- EarthSide Down (1998)
- Days Like These (1997)

== 7-inch vinyl ==
- Bad Time for Love (2014)
- Boots of Spanish Leather (2002)

== Digital EPs ==
- Letters from an Expatriate (live 2013)
- Me I'm From LA Where Nothing is Sacred (live 2009)

== Digital singles ==
- "Pleasure to Burn" (2019)
- "Undertow" / "Ring Them Bells" (2012)
- "Heart Like Feathers" (acoustic) (2011)

== Compilations (featuring Robert Deeble) ==
- The Round Compilation (2011)
- Pop Tomorrow 2 (2009)
- Preserve – Fractured Discs Compilation (2003)
- Eye of the Beholder II – Tract Records Compilation (2002)
- May Your Song Always Be Sung: The Songs of Bob Dylan, Volume 3 – BMG Europe (2002)
- By the People for the People – Jackson Rubio (1997)
