= Prodigal (album) =

Studio album by Prodigal
- Released: 1982
- Genre: Contemporary Christian music; Christian rock
- Label: Heartland Records
- Producer: Jon Phelps

Prodigal chronology
Prodigal (1982)	Electric Eye (1984)

Prodigal is the self-titled debut album by the Contemporary Christian/Christian rock band Prodigal, released in 1982.

The album cover is notable for mimicking M. C. Escher's Relativity, but featuring imagery inspired by each of the song titles.

In 2014, Loyd Boldman and Rick Fields (founding members of Prodigal and sole owners of all rights to the sound recordings, videos, artwork, images, and music publishing of the complete Prodigal library) released a 3 CD boxed set of all 3 Prodigal albums remastered for digital on Fields' Silver Orb Media label. Shortly after the re-issue was announced, Loyd Boldman died after a long illness.

== Track listing ==
Side one
No.	Title	Writer(s)	Lead Vocal	Length
1.	"Invisible Man"	Lloyd Boldman, Rick Fields	Boldman	4:10
2.	"Easy Street"	Dave Workman, Boldman, Fields	Workman, Boldman, Fields	4:06
3.	"Fire with Fire"	Boldman	Fields, Boldman	4:15
4.	"Sleepwalker"	Boldman	Boldman	2:53
5.	"Want You Back Again"	Boldman	Fields	3:50

Side two
No.	Title	Writer(s)	Lead Vocal	Length
1.	"Prodigal"	Fields	Fields	1:10
2.	"I Don't Know Who You Are"	Boldman	Boldman	2:35
3.	"Need Somebody to Love"	Boldman	Boldman	4:02
4.	"Busy Man"	Workman, Boldman	Workman	3:40
5.	"Hard Bargain"	Boldman, Fields	Fields	4:00
6.	"Prodigal (Part two)"	Fields	Fields	0:46
7.	"Sidewinder"	Boldman	Boldman	6:34

== Band members ==
- Loyd Boldman: Keyboards, vocals
- Dave Workman: Drums, percussion, vocals
- Rick Fields: Guitars, vocals
- Mike Wilson: Bass guitar

== Other personnel ==
- John Blake: Acoustic Guitar (3)
- Jon Goin: Rhythm guitar (5, 7, 10)
- Shane Keister: Keyboards (5, 7, 10)
- David Kemper: Drums (5, 7, 10)
- Farrell Morris: Percussion (5, 7, 10)
- David Philbrick: Soprano saxophone (5)
- Turley Richards: Background vocals (5, 10)
- Jack Williams: Bass guitar (5, 7, 10)

== Production ==
- Producer: Jon Phelps
- Engineers: Gary Platt, Greg McNeily
- Jim Hettinger: Synthesizer programming
