= This Moment: In Toronto with the Loose Band =

Live album by Victoria Williams
- Released: November 7, 1995
- Recorded: March 29, 1995
- Venue: Bathurst Street Theater, Toronto, Ontario, Canada
- Length: 69:02
- Language: English
- Label: Atlantic/Mammoth
- Producer: Danny Greenspoon

Victoria Williams chronology
Loose (1994)	This Moment: In Toronto with the Loose Band (1995)	Musings of a Creek Dipper (1998)

This Moment: In Toronto with the Loose Band is a 1995 live album by American singer-songwriter Victoria Williams. It has received positive reviews from critics.

== Reception ==
Editors at AllMusic rated this album 3 out of 5 stars, with critic Lindsay Planer writing that "This Moment is a precious and rare gift from a flower to her audience" and the album has "animated" versions of songs from Williams' three studio albums. Chris Molanphy of CMJ New Music Monthly wrote that "it's a joy to hear a show where audience and performer merge without cues" and continued that Williams "hugs these songs with her plaintive croon and infectious grace". A brief review in Entertainment Weekly opined "so what if this here butterfly often tips the sugar scales?" and rated these "16 sweet, subtle tales of dirt-road despair" a B. An evaluation in No Depression called out how the "instrumentation is beautiful" and speculated that this release is unlikely to win Williams new fans, but will satisfy her existing listeners. In a review of Williams' career for Trouser Press by Ira Robins, Wif Stenger, and Floyd Eberhard, the publication states that "the piano-based chamber-pop arrangements reach rarefied Joni Mitchell levels, and the album tilts dangerously toward the preciousness Williams’ best studio work (and guitar-based concerts) so easily resists".

== Track listing ==
All songs written by Victoria Williams, except where noted.

1. "This Moment" (Mike Heron and Williams) – 3:51
2. "Graveyard" – 3:59
3. "Harry Went to Heaven" – 3:19
4. "Waterfall" – 3:21
5. "Polish Those Shoes" – 5:53
6. "TC" – 4:42
7. "Frying Pan" – 3:15
8. "Hitchhikers Smile" – 4:58
9. "Crazy Mary" – 6:31
10. "Lights" – 2:29
11. "Summer of Drugs" – 5:39
12. "Imagination" (Johnny Burke and James Van Heusen) – 3:22
13. "Smoke Gets in Your Eyes" (Otto Harbach and Jerome Kern) – 3:21
14. "Can’t Cry Hard Enough" (Marvin Etzioni and David Williams) – 4:41
15. "Sunshine Country" – 4:52
16. "Love" – 4:47

== Personnel ==
Victoria Williams and The Loose Band

- Joey Burns – upright bass
- Dan Heffington – drums
- David Manfield – acoustic guitar, violin, pedal steel guitar
- Tim Ray – piano
- Andrew Williams – acoustic guitar
- David Williams – vocals
- Victoria Williams – electric guitar, vocals

Additional personnel

- Todd Fraracci – recording
- Danny Greenspoon – production
- Cory Hambleton – production assistance
- Tom Herbers – remixing at Paisley Park Studios, Minneapolis, Minnesota, United States; digital editing at Wild Audio, Minneapolis, Minnesota, United States; sequencing at Wild Audio, Minneapolis, Minnesota, United States
- Shane T. Keller – assistant engineering
- Gary Louris – sketch
- Marko Shark – photography
- Vic – paintings
- Doug Wild – digital editing at Wild Audio, Minneapolis, Minnesota, United States; sequencing at Wild Audio, Minneapolis, Minnesota, United States

== See also ==
- List of 1995 albums
