= The Coincidentalist =

2013 album by Howe Gelb

Studio album by Howe Gelb
- Released: 5 November 2013
- Recorded: 2012–2013
- Genre: Acoustic rock, folk
- Length: 34:00
- Label: New West Records
- Producer: Howe Gelb, M. Ward, Steve Shelley

Howe Gelb chronology
Dust Bowl (2011)	The Coincidentalist (2013)	Future Standards (2016)

Singles from The Coincidentalist
- 1. "Vortexas" Released: 27 August 2013

The Coincidentalist is the 21st studio album by American singer-songwriter Howe Gelb. It was released on 5 November 2013 worldwide, by American independent label New West Records. Teaming up with M. Ward and Steve Shelley from Sonic Youth, Gelb brings eleven songs inspired by his native Arizona Desert, in which he recorded KT Tunstall's fifth album Invisible Empire // Crescent Moon earlier in 2013.

Recorded at Tucson's Wavelab Studio & Harvey Moltz's studio, The Coincidentalist is an Acoustic rock LP that features guest contributions from Bonnie 'Prince' Billy and KT Tunstall, and received critical acclaim.

During 2014, Howe Gelb embarked a Coincidentalist tour in America and Europe.

== Critical reception ==
Professional ratings
Aggregate scores
Source	Rating
Metacritic	78/100
Review scores
Source	Rating
AllMusic	4/5 stars
Exclaim!	4/5 stars
The Independent	3/5 stars

The Coincidentalist received very good ratings. Andy Gill, from The Independent, praised most of the songs, calling the album "a set of relaxed songs", and gave it 3 out of 5 stars. Mojo magazine, with 4 out of 5 stars, wrote that "it's his excellently loose band (featuring M. Ward and Sonic Youth's Steve Shelley), intimate vocals and fondness for chimes that keep the disintegrating threads woven together". NOW magazine, Exclaim!, Blurt Magazine, and Magnet gave the album 4 out of 5 stars.

AllMusic gave the album 4 out of 5 stars, writing: "The Coincidentalist is one of Gelb's most realized efforts; despite its relaxed, airy presentation, it's musically and lyrically provocative, as poetic, strange, and mysterious as the desert itself."

Tucson Weekly, a newspaper from Gelb's hometown, wrote that "it's mixed up close, like an intimate, whispered confidence, as if Gelb were spinning old stories in the privacy of your living room."

== Track listing ==
Side One
No.	Title	Music	Producer(s)	Length
1.	"Vortexas Featuring Bonnie Billy"	Howe Gelb	Howe Gelb	4:18
2.	"Left Of Center"	Gelb	Gelb	2:06
3.	"Running Behind"	Gelb	Gelb	2:24
4.	"The 3 Deaths of Lucky Featuring KT Tunstall"	Gelb	Gelb	4:34
5.	"Unforgivable"	Gelb	Gelb	2:17
6.	"Instigated Chimes"	Gelb	Gelb	2:54
Total length:				17:53

Side Two
No.	Title	Music	Producer(s)	Length
1.	"The Coincidentalist"	Gelb	Gelb	2:50
2.	"Triangulate"	Gelb	Gelb	3:20
3.	"Picacho Peak"	Gelb	Gelb	4:22
4.	"An Extended Plan Of Existence"	Gelb	Gelb	4:42
5.	"Looking That Way"	Gelb	Gelb	2:11
Total length:				16:07

== Personnel ==
- Howe Gelb: vocals, guitar, piano, songwriting, engineering
- Thøger Tetens Lund: bass
- Steve Shelley: drums
- John Paris: mixing
- M.Ward: guitar
- Thøger Tetens Lund: bass, guitar, cello, bow
- Gabrielle Pietrangelo, Laura Kepner-Adney and Caroline Isaacs: Backing Harmonist
- Bonnie 'Prince' Billy: vocals track 1
- KT Tunstall: vocals track 4
- Andrew Bird: violinist
- Jon Rauhouse: pedal steel
- Luke Bullen: drummer
- Chris Shultz, Eric Westfall: engineering
- Joe Gastwirt: mastering

== Release history ==
Region	Date	Label	Format
Worldwide	5 November 2013	New West Records	
