= The Bridge: A Tribute to Neil Young =

The Bridge: A Tribute To Neil Young

Compilation album by Various Artists
- Released: July 28, 1989
- Recorded: 1988–1989
- Genre: Alternative rock
- Length: 56:31
- Label: Caroline Records
- Producer: Various

Professional ratings
Review scores
Source	Rating
AllMusic	4.5/5 stars
Robert Christgau	B

The Bridge: A Tribute To Neil Young is a 1989 tribute album that features alternative rock bands covering songs written by Neil Young. A portion of the profits from the album were donated to The Bridge School, which develops and uses advanced technologies to aid in the instruction of disabled children. It was released on Caroline Records and conceived by executive producer Terry Tolkin.

== Track listing ==
No.	Title	Artist	Length
1.	"Barstool Blues"	Soul Asylum	2:51
2.	"Don't Let It Bring You Down"	Victoria Williams	2:53
3.	"After the Gold Rush"	The Flaming Lips	4:14
4.	"Captain Kennedy"	Nikki Sudden	4:01
5.	"Cinnamon Girl"	Loop	2:50
6.	"Helpless"	Nick Cave	4:32
7.	"Winterlong"	Pixies	3:11
8.	"Computer Age"	Sonic Youth	5:13
9.	"Only Love Can Break Your Heart"	Psychic TV	6:08
10.	"Lotta Love"	Dinosaur Jr.	2:41
11.	"The Needle and the Damage Done"/"Tonight's The Night"	Henry Kaiser	5:54

CD bonus tracks
No.	Title	Artist	Length
12.	"Mr. Soul"	Bongwater	3:30
13.	"My My, Hey Hey (Out of the Blue)"	B.A.L.L.	2:16
14.	"Words (Between The Lines Of Age)"	Henry Kaiser	6:19
