= David Wolfenberger =

American singer-songwriter (born 1969)

Background information
- Also known as: Sunrise for Someone
- Born: David Wolfenberger; April 19, 1969 (age 57); Tuscola, Illinois, U.S.
- Origin: Cincinnati, Ohio
- Genres: folk, singer-songwriter, folk-rock
- Instruments: vocals, guitar, piano, banjo, bass, drums
- Years active: 1990–present
- Labels: Blue Jordan, Fundamental
- Formerly of: The Marshwiggles; Thom Scarecrow; Original Harmony Ridge Creekdippers
- Website: davidwolfenberger.com

David Wolfenberger (born April 19, 1969 in Tuscola, Illinois) is a singer-songwriter from Cincinnati, Ohio. Former frontman for The Marshwiggles and Thom Scarecrow, Wolfenberger has three solo CDs to date; Tales From Thom Scarecrow, and World of the Satisfy'n Place on Blue Jordan Records and more recently in 2006 on Fundamental Records, Portrait of Narcissus. Wolfenberger also toured and recorded as a member of Mark Olson and Victoria Williams' Original Harmony Ridge Creekdippers. Wolfenberger occasionally records under the pseudonym Sunrise for Someone.

== Biography ==
Dave Wolfenberger was part of a band called Selah while a History student at the University of Cincinnati in the early 1990s. This band was later renamed The Remnant due to another band having the same name. They played monthly concerts at a local church. One of their songs, "I Am Here" was written by Dave Wolfenberger and helped at least one person, me, accept Jesus to become his personal Savior. This band came out with two tapes of their music. The first album contained the song "I AM HERE." While I have been told there are at least two versions of this song, one version of the song was recently sung by David and can be listened to at Crossroads Church website though the external link I have placed in the external links. The link will be preceded by the number 2.

In 1997 Wolfenberger's band the Marshwiggles released their first and only album Stone Soup on the local Cincinnati label Blue Jordan Records. It was played nationally and the band toured regionally to sizable crowds but broke up during the recording of their second album just prior to its completion and release. This album has never been released although tracks from it have shown up on Blue Jordan compilations. Wolfenberger then formed the band Thom Scarecrow with acoustic guitarist Jason Dennie and fellow Marshwiggles, Tony Moore and Joshua Seurkamp. This would be a short-lived ensemble lasting just over a year.

In 1999 Wolfenberger's first solo album, Tales From Thom Scarecrow was released and won him Artist of the Year in his hometown at the Cincinnati Entertainment Awards as well as notoriety abroad from such notable media as the Corriere della Sera in Milan, Italy which stated that "Wolfenberger puts forth folk with dark nuances, the grand introspective songs are illuminated with emotions in this exhibition of his life."

In 2000 he joined iconoclastic songwriters Mark Olson and Victoria Williams as a touring and recording member of the Original Harmony Ridge Creekdippers. In 2001 while still touring with the Creekdippers Wolfenberger recorded his second solo album with his band entitled World of the Satisfyn' Place. This album was decidedly more roots oriented than his first (a return to his style with the Marshwiggles and Thom Scarecrow) and swung wildly from raucous to thoughtful on a song to song basis., It was even more well received by the critics. The Detroit Metro Times stated that "Wolfenberger ambles between homespun Appalachian traditions and classic pop and country forms with an unwavering dedication to simple, gorgeous melodies that are alternately uplifting and devastating." While in Britain, Americana-UK called it "a 100% solid gold classic". and his hometown Cincinnati press named it "one of the best albums (local or national) of the year".

In the following two years he would appear on two Creekdipper albums, release a free folk gospel album under the pseudonym Sunrise for Someone and eventually in 2003 stop touring and recording with the Creekdippers although maintaining a close relationship, which would become apparent with the release of his third solo album entitled Portrait of Narcissus in 2006 which featured fellow Creekdippers, Victoria Williams, Joshua Grange (by then a regular member of Dwight Yoakam's band), and fellow independent folkie Michelle Shocked. This would be Wolfenberger's first album to be distributed beyond America and Europe into Asia and Australia due to its release by recently revived Fundamental Records. It would even end up at No. 12 on the independent Euro Americana Chart

In July 2008 Wolfenberger recorded and made available another folk gospel project under the pseudonym Sunrise for Someone entitled Summer Lake Champion. In August of the same year he released Just Burned Upon The Page a live and mostly solo recording of 7 songs. The proceeds benefit the Juvenile Diabetes Research Foundation.

== Discography ==
=== with The Marshwiggles ===
- Stone Soup (1997 Blue Jordan)
- "Valentine" (1999 single, Blue Jordan)

=== David Wolfenberger albums ===
- Tales From Thom Scarecrow (1999, Blue Jordan)
- World of the Satisfy'n Place (2001, Blue Jordan)
- Portrait of Narcissus (2006, Fundamental)
- Just Burned Upon The Page -live EP (2008, Blue Jordan Records)

=== Sunrise for Someone albums ===
- Spring Rome (2002, SFS)
- Summer Lake Champion (2008, SFS)

=== Other projects ===
- 'Pepsi Jammin' On Main Compilation CD', 1997 Pepsi-Cola
- Blue Jordan Live Compilation, 1998 Blue Jordan Records
- Audiosyncrasies; 'The Queen City Collection' Live Compilation CD, 1999 X-Star Radio Network
- "People Like Us" Movie Soundtrack, 2000 KPG Ltd.
- Oasis Rock and Roots Sampler, 2000 Oasis Music
- 'Open Hands, Bare Feet', 2001 Crossroads Music
- Mark Olson and the Creekdippers, 'December's Child', 2002 Dulatone Music Group, Inc.
- The Wrenfields, 'Seconds', 2003 Wrenfields LLC
- Save Elizabeth Live Compilation, 2004 VC Music
- Rivertown Breakdown Compilation, 2004 RTB
- Blue Jordan Spring Songs Sampler, 2005 Blue Jordan Records
- Heartfelt Film Short, 2006 Pro Video Bandit Productions
- Fundamental Records Sampler 2006, 2006 Fundamental Records

== Awards ==
- Cincinnati Entertainment Awards: Artist of the Year – 1999
- Cincinnati Citysearch: Best Local Songwriter (2000 Editor's Winner/2000 Audience Winner)
- CityBeat Magazine: Album of the Year – 2001
- CityBeat Magazine: Top Ten Albums of the Last Ten Years – 2004
