= Happy Come Home =

Studio album by Victoria Williams
- Released: 1987
- Studios: RPM; Sorcerer Sound
- Length: 41:23
- Label: Geffen
- Producers: Anton Fier; Stephen Soles

Victoria Williams chronology
Happy Come Home (1987)	Swing the Statue! (1990)

Happy Come Home is the debut studio album by American singer-songwriter Victoria Williams. It has received positive reviews from critics.

== Reception ==
Professional ratings
Review scores
Source	Rating
AllMusic	4/5 stars
The Boston Phoenix	2.5/4 stars
Chicago Tribune	2/4 stars
Encyclopedia of Popular Music	3/5 stars
MusicHound Rock	3/5 stars
Spin Alternative Record Guide	7/10
The Village Voice	B+

Editors at AllMusic rated this album 4 out of 5 stars, with critic Lindsay Planer writing "Happy Come Home is the personification of the word eclectic" and "there is an undeniable strength and maturity in Williams' songwriting". In Spin, Billy Altman praised Williams' vocals and songwriting that shows she is "blissfully at peace with the universe". In a review of Williams' career for Trouser Press by Ira Robins, Wif Stenger, and Floyd Eberhard, the publication blames producers Anton Fier and Stephen Soles for "burying Williams and her eccentric voice in a massive studio effort", but praised the string arrangements by Van Dyke Parks.

== Commercial performance ==
Happy Come Home was difficult to market and by 1997, it had only sold 14,000 units and never charted on any Billboard chart.

== Track listing ==
All tracks are written by Victoria Williams, except where noted.

No.	Title	Writer(s)	Length
1.	"Shoes"		3:00
2.	"Frying Pan"		3:34
3.	"Merry Go Round"		4:26
4.	"Happy"		0:58
5.	"TC"		3:57
6.	"I'll Do His Will"	James Cleveland	5:09
7.	"Big Fish"		3:36
8.	"Animal Wild"		3:01
9.	"Main Road"		3:02
10.	"Lights"		1:45
11.	"Opelousas"		2:55
12.	"Statue of a Bum"		4:43
13.	"Poetry"		1:17

== Personnel ==
- Victoria Williams – vocals, painting
- Lamar Alsop – violin
- Sarah Auld – production coordination
- Amy Berger – instrumentation
- Peter Blegvad – vocals
- Carla Bley – piano
- Alfred Brown – strings
- T-Bone Burnett – guitar
- Ralph Carney – saxophone
- Greg Cohen – bass guitar
- Tony Conniff – bass guitar
- Bob Cranshaw – bass guitar
- Stephen Croce – backing vocals
- Robin Danar – recording
- Angel Dean – backing vocals
- Anton Fier – arrangement on "Merry Go Round", "I'll Do His Will", and "Opelousas"; production
- Irwin Fisch – instrumentation
- Ralph Forbes – drum programming on "Animal Wild"
- Danny Frankel – percussion
- Jody Harris – guitar
- Jeri Heiden – art direction
- Lisa Herman – backing vocals
- Chris Howard – recording
- Fats Kaplin – fiddle
- "Iron" Mike Krowiak – audio engineering at Grog Kill Studio
- Jesse Levy – cello
- Tony Maimone – bass guitar
- George Marino – audio mastering at Sterling Sound
- Hugh McCracken – guitar
- LouAnn Montessi – violin
- Van Dyke Parks – string arrangement on "Shoes", "TC", and "Main Road"
- Mark Pawlowski – arrangement on "Shoes", "TC", and "Main Road"
- Bobby Previte – drums
- Hans Reumschuessel – instrumentation
- Stephen Soles – backing vocals, production
- Syd Straw – backing vocals
- Steve Swallow – bass guitar
- David Van Tieghem – percussion
- Bernie Worrell – keyboards

== See also ==
- List of 1987 albums
