= Sweet Relief Musicians Fund =

American charity

- The Sweet Relief Musicians Fund emblem
- Founded: 1994
- Founder: Victoria Williams
- Type: Charity
- Purpose: Sweet Relief Musicians Fund provides financial assistance to all types of career musicians and music industry workers who are struggling to make ends meet while facing physical or mental health issues, disability, or age-related problems.
- Location: Brea, California
- Region served: United States
- Method: Financial Aid
- Website: http://www.sweetrelief.org

Sweet Relief Musicians Fund is a nonprofit charity that maintains a financial fund from which professional musicians can draw when in need of medical care or financial needs. Initially intended as a one-time CD launch benefit for Victoria Williams, Sweet Relief has evolved into a charity organization that relies on donations from artists and the public as a general fund to all professional musicians and music industry workers in need. The fund provides financial assistance to all types of career musicians and music industry workers who are struggling with their finances while facing physical or mental health issues, disability, or age-related problems.

== History ==
=== Founding and first CD release ===
The organization was started after musician and singer Victoria Williams was diagnosed with multiple sclerosis (MS) in 1993 and had no way to pay for her medical expenses. Money was raised through benefit concerts and the release of a CD, Sweet Relief: A Benefit for Victoria Williams, featuring artists like Lou Reed and Pearl Jam.

=== Second CD release ===
A second CD titled Sweet Relief II: Gravity of the Situation was released in 1996. All of the proceeds went toward Sweet Relief Musicians Fund to aid the organization. A variety of alternative rock artists volunteered their time to perform a variety of songs composed by Vic Chesnutt. Some well-known artists including Garbage, R.E.M., Hootie and the Blowfish, The Smashing Pumpkins, Joe Henry and Madonna performed for the CD.

== Services ==
Sweet Relief provides service to the music community through financial assistance in the following categories:

- Insurance Premiums
- Prescriptions
- Housing Costs
- Food Costs
- Alternative Therapies/Treatments not covered by insurance

== Criteria for eligibility ==
Candidacy for assistance depends, among other factors, on the availability of funds and the number of eligible applicants, along with the following criteria:

- The applicant must be a musician who has regular public performances, or performed on at least three widely released recordings (audio or audiovisual), or written music that has been performed on three widely released recordings, or published on three occasions.
- The applicant must demonstrate financial need.
- Older musicians that require short-term assistance for basic needs.
- Except for retired or semi-retired older musicians, the applicant must have, or recently have had, a serious medical condition. A condition is considered to be serious when it substantially affects the applicant's ability to work within or outside the music industry.

Exceptions may be made to any individual who does not meet these criteria but believes himself or herself to be eligible for assistance.

== Management staff ==
=== Executives ===
- Bill Bennett – President
- Aric Steinberg – Executive Director

=== Board of directors ===
- Victoria Williams – Founder, Singer/songwriter and musician
- J. Mark Matthews MD
- Ariel Hyatt
- Peter Wark
- David Bournasian
- Sheldon Gomberg
- Allison Shaw

== Notable supporters ==
Sweet Relief Musicians Fund has worked with many notable musicians. A list of supporters, past and present, is shown below:

- 311
- 7th Order
- A Perfect Circle
- Aerosmith
- Alan Jackson
- Alanis Morissette
- Alice Cooper
- Ani DiFranco
- Ashlee Simpson
- Audioslave
- Avril Lavigne
- Barbra Streisand
- Barry Manilow
- B. B. King
- Barenaked Ladies
- Beastie Boys
- Beck
- Ben Harper
- Bette Midler
- Beyoncé
- Billy Corgan
- Billy Joel
- Björk
- Blink-182
- Bob Dylan
- Bonnie Raitt
- Brad Paisley
- Brian Setzer
- Brian Wilson
- Britney Spears
- Brooks & Dunn
- Bruce Springsteen
- Celine
- Cher
- Chicago
- Christina Aguilera
- Chuck Schuldiner
- Coldplay
- Cypress Hill
- Dave Matthews Band
- Dave Navarro
- David Bowie
- Death
- Destiny's Child
- Dixie Chicks
- Dolly Parton
- Duran Duran
- Eagles
- Earth, Wind & Fire
- Elton John
- Eminem
- EMI
- Emmylou Harris
- Fugees
- Gloria Estefan
- Godsmack
- Good Charlotte
- Grant-Lee Phillips
- Gretchen Wilson
- Heart
- Hootie & the Blowfish
- Hot Hot Heat
- Ice Cube
- Incubus
- Indigo Girls
- Jack Johnson
- Jackson Browne
- Janet Jackson
- Jeff Tweedy
- Jerry Cantrell
- Jerry Lee Lewis
- Jewel
- Jimmy Buffett
- Jimmy Eat World
- John Mellencamp
- Johnny Mathis
- Jon Bon Jovi
- Juanes
- Justin Timberlake
- Keith Urban
- Kelly Clarkson
- Kenny Chesney
- Kiss
- Korn
- Lenny Kravitz
- Linkin Park
- Loggins & Messina
- Los Lobos
- Lou Reed
- Madonna
- Mariah Carey
- Marilyn Manson
- Matisyahu
- Matchbox Twenty
- Melissa Etheridge
- Merle Haggard
- Michelle Branch
- Mötley Crüe
- NSYNC
- Nappy Roots
- Natalie Cole
- Neil Diamond
- Neil Young
- Nelly
- New Found Glory
- No Doubt
- Norah Jones
- The Offspring
- Patti Smith
- Pearl Jam
- Pete Yorn
- Peter Gabriel
- Pink
- The Pixies
- Phish
- P.O.D.
- Puddle of Mudd
- Queens of the Stone Age
- Quincy Jones
- Randy Newman
- Reba McEntire
- Red Hot Chili Peppers
- R.E.M.
- Ringo Starr
- Rob Thomas
- Santana
- Sarah McLachlan
- Shania Twain
- The Smashing Pumpkins
- Staind
- Sting
- The Strokes
- System of a Down
- Third Eye Blind
- Tim McGraw
- Tom Jones
- Tom Petty
- Tony Bennett
- Trisha Yearwood
- Van Halen
- Vic Chesnutt
- Victoria Williams
- "Weird" Al Yankovic
- Xzibit
- Yanni
- Yellowcard

== Discography (benefit albums) ==
- Sweet Relief: A Benefit for Victoria Williams (1993)
- Sweet Relief II: Gravity of the Situation (1996) (Tribute to Vic Chesnutt)
- Sweet Relief III: Pennies From Heaven (2013)
- If You're Going to the City: A Tribute to Mose Allison (2019)
- Party for Joey: Sweet Relief Tribute to Joey Spampinato (2021)
- Long Distance Love: A Sweet Relief Tribute to Lowell George (2024)
- Tonight I'll Go Down Swingin': A Tribute to Don Heffington (2024)
- Sweet Relief: We Can Help (2025)
