= Portrait of Narcissus =

2006 album by David Wolfenberger

Portrait of Narcissus cover

Portrait Of Narcissus is the third solo album by David Wolfenberger. It was released in 2006 on Fundamental Records with Blue Jordan Records as an imprint. The album contains 12 original tracks and features such notables as Victoria Williams on vocals, Michelle Shocked on vocals, Joshua Seurkamp on drums, Kim Taylor on vocals and Joshua Grange on pedal steel guitar. Victoria Williams also painted the portrait of Wolfenberger that is on the cover and inside the album. It was well received by British and European critics and ended up at #12 on the independent Euro Americana Chart for April 2006

== Songs ==
- Something's Gotta Give
- Freezin' Walt Disney Blues
- Inconsolably Overjoyed
- Parking Lot Martyrs
- Vespa Girl
- See The Evening Star
- Cicada Summer
- Ferris Wheel
- Portrait Of Narcissus
- The Wreck Election
- When Everything Is Over
- Sad, Lonely, Rotten World
