= Sweet Relief II: Gravity of the Situation =

Compilation album by Various artists
- Released: August 6, 1996
- Recorded: 1994–1996
- Genre: Alternative rock
- Labels: Columbia (Sony Music Entertainment)
- Producer: Greg Sowders (Executive producer)

Various artists chronology
| Sweet Relief: A Benefit for Victoria Williams (1993) | Sweet Relief II: Gravity of the Situation (1996) | Sweet Relief III: Pennies From Heaven (2013) |

Singles from Sweet Relief II: Gravity of the Situation
- 1. "Sponge" Released: July 9, 1996

Sweet Relief II: Gravity of the Situation is a 1996 charity record that featured a variety of alternative rock bands covering songs written by quadriplegic musician Vic Chesnutt. Some of the artists were picked to give the album an international appeal to raise more funds for the Sweet Relief Musicians Fund, which assists musicians in need of health care.

The album was a sequel to the 1993 compilation Sweet Relief: A Benefit for Victoria Williams and like the earlier release, proceeds went to the Sweet Relief Musicians Fund, while Chesnutt received new and widespread public interest. Chesnutt was selected by Victoria Williams as the focus of the second album because "not only is he an unsung talented singer/songwriter... but he represents the plight of a physically handicapped musician who's still out there working".

The album was preceded at alternative rock radio by the release of "Sponge", as performed by R.E.M., while a live music video of Garbage performing "Kick My Ass" was playlisted by VH1.

== Track listing ==
1. Garbage – "Kick My Ass"
2. R.E.M. – "Sponge"
3. Nanci Griffith with Hootie and the Blowfish – "Gravity of the Situation"
4. Soul Asylum – "When I Ran Off and Left Her"
5. Dog's Eye View – "Dodge"
6. Live – "Supernatural"
7. Smashing Pumpkins with Red Red Meat – "Sad Peter Pan"
8. Sparklehorse – "West of Rome"
9. Joe Henry and Madonna – "Guilty by Association"
10. Kristin Hersh – "Panic Pure"
11. Cracker – "Withering"
12. Indigo Girls – "Free of Hope"
13. Mary Margaret O'Hara – "Florida"
14. Vic Chesnutt and Victoria Williams – "God Is Good"

== "Guilty by Association" ==
Joe Henry, the brother-in-law of Madonna, told Q,

"[Madonna] doesn't know Vic, but the song I covered is 'Guilty by Association', which Vic wrote about the albatross of Michael Stipe's celebrity. Somehow Vic got Michael to sing backing vocals on the song without him knowing that the song is about him. So when I asked if I could do that song – because I didn't know what it was about either – somebody said, Why don't you get Madonna to sing Michael's part? Seeing as how the irony is so rich and it was going to benefit Vic, I was willing to make the phone call. She was a good sport."

"It turned out quite beautifully, I'm happy to report," he added to Select. "She's quite a good singer if you didn't know. I didn't know."

== Comprehensive charts ==
| Chart (1996) | Peak |
|---|---|
| United States Billboard 200 | 115 |
