= Andrew Collberg =

American drummer

- Born: September 18, 1987 (age 38); Lund, Sweden
- Website: andrewcollberg.com

Andrew Collberg (born September 18, 1987) is a musician living in Köln, Germany who grew up in Tucson, AZ.

== Albums ==
"A Modern Act" 2022 Papercup Records

"1986" 2020 Papercup Records

"MINDS HITS" August 2013 Le Pop Musik

"Dirty Wind/ Back On The Shore" 2011 Fort Lowell Records

"On The Wreath" 2010 Le Pop Musik
