= Janet Pressley =

American singer-songwriter

- Birth name: Janet Pressley
- Origin: Cincinnati, Ohio
- Genres: folk, singer-songwriter, folk-rock
- Instrument(s): vocals, guitar
- Years active: 1993–present
- Labels: Blue Jordan
- Website: bluejordan.com/jpt/

Janet Pressley is an American singer-songwriter from Cincinnati, Ohio, who founded the Blue Jordan Coffeehouse which later became Blue Jordan Records. She has released two full-length records on the label; Late Last Night and A Deeper State Of Blue. She also released a special EP entitled Songs To Sing in a Cathedral at Advent in 2005. Dirty Linen described her 1996 debut, Late Last Night as "a refreshing collection of songs in the folk-pop rock vein, melodic and catchy, with nice lyrical depth."
