= Howe Gelb =

American singer-songwriter

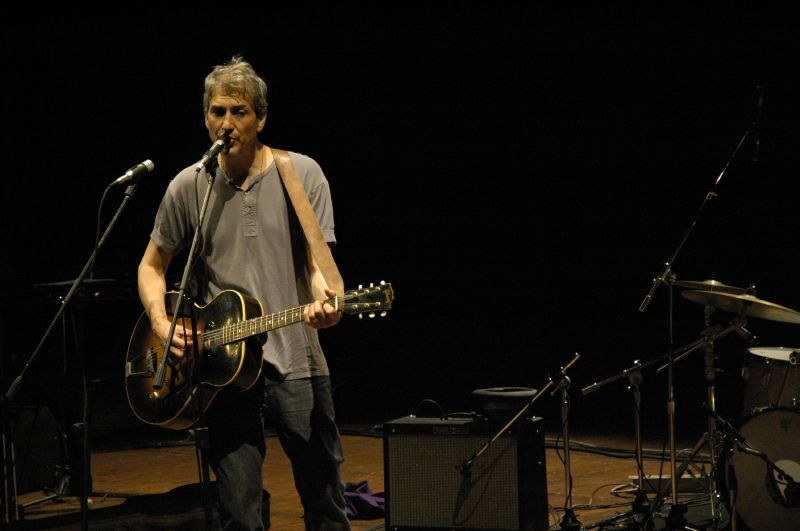
- Gelb performing in 2007

Background information
- Born: Howard Gelb; October 22, 1956 (age 69); Wilkes-Barre, Pennsylvania, U.S.
- Origin: Tucson, Arizona, U.S.
- Genres: Indie rock, Americana, alt.country, roots rock, indie folk, folk-rock, lo-fi
- Occupations: Musician, songwriter, record producer
- Instruments: Vocals, guitar, piano
- Labels: Ow Om, Loose Music
- Website: howegelb.bandcamp.com

Howard “Howe” Gelb (born October 22, 1956, in Wilkes-Barre, Pennsylvania) is an American singer-songwriter, musician and record producer based in Tucson, Arizona.

== Projects ==
Gelb's approach to music is collaborative and he has recorded with a number of side projects. In a 2004 interview with Gelb, The Guardian wrote "Gelb's way of dealing with it was to treat Giant Sand (not to be confused with his 1970s electro-rock band Giant Sandworms) as a loose, uncompetitive, mutually supportive musical collective, a place for friends to hang out and play. 'I just liked the idea of having this kind of removed world, this brotherhood—the idea of a band being something more than a front person or dealing with the throes of fame.'"

In 2013, he worked with the Scottish singer/songwriter KT Tunstall on her fourth studio album Invisible Empire // Crescent Moon. He co-wrote and co-produced, and sang on several songs. His own solo album entitled The Coincidentalist was released on New West Records in November 2013.

An impromptu performance at the wedding of a mutual friend lead to a long-distance collaboration under the name Geckøs with M. Ward and McKowski of The Lost Brothers. The group released its first eponymous album in September 2025.

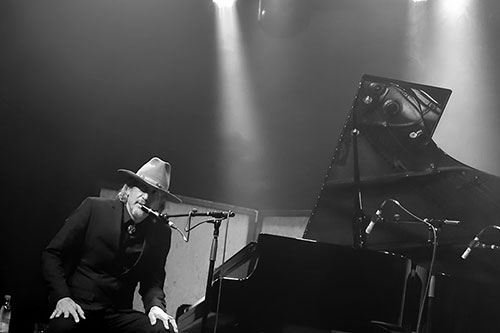

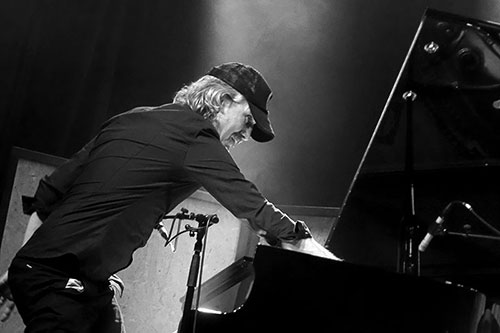

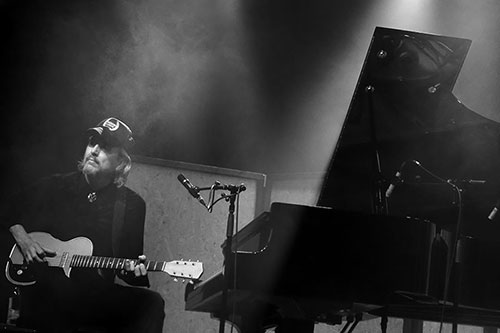

== Discography ==
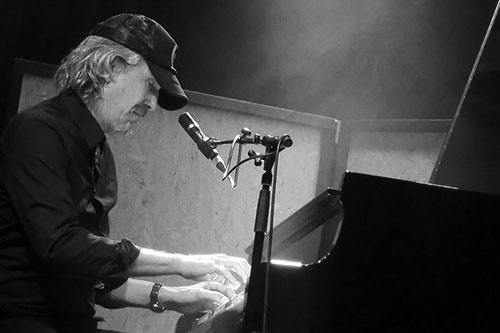
Gelb at Aarhus Festival, Denmark (2015)

=== Giant Sand ===
- Valley of Rain (1985)
- Ballad of a Thin Line Man (1986)
- Storm (1987)
- The Love Songs (1988)
- Long Stem Rant (1989)
- Swerve (1990)
- Ramp (1991)
- Center of the Universe (1992)
- Stromausfall (1993)
- Purge & Slouch (1994)
- Glum (1994)
- Goods and Services (1995)
- Backyard Barbecue Broadcast (1995)
- Build Your Own Night It's Easy (1997)
- Chore of Enchantment (2000)
- The Rock Opera Years (2000)
- Unsungglum (2001)
- Cover Magazine (2002)
- Selections Circa 1990-2000 (Compilation, 2001)
- Infiltration of Dreams (2003)
- Too Many Spare Parts in the Yard Too Close at Hand (2003)
- Is All Over the Map (2004)
- Provisions (2008)
- Provisional Supplement (2008)
- Blurry Blue Mountain (2010)
- Tucson (2012)
- Heartbreak Pass (2015)
- The Sun Set Vol.1 [Vinyl LP] (2017)
- Returns To Valley Of Rain (2018)

=== Arizona Amp and Alternator ===
- Arizona Amp and Alternator (2005)
- The Open Road (2016)

=== Howe Gelb ===
- Incidental Music (1983)
- Dreaded Brown Recluse (1991)
- Hisser (1998)
- Upside Down Home (1998)
- Upside Down Home 2000 (2000)
- Confluence (2001)
- Lull Some Piano (2001)
- The Listener (2003)
- Upside Down Home 2002 (2003)
- Ogle Some Piano (2004)
- The Listener's Coffee Companion (2004)
- Upside Down Home 2004: Year of the Monkey (2004)
- 'Sno Angel Like You (2006)
- Fourcast: Flurries (2006)
- Upside Down Home 2007: Return to San Pedro (2007)
- Spun Some Piano (2008)
- 'Sno Angel Winging It (Live album) (2009)
- Alegrías (2010)
- Melted Wires (2010)
- Snarl Some Piano (2011)
- Dust Bowl (2013)
- The Coincidentalist (2013)
- Future Standards (2016)
- Further Standards (2017) (with Lonna Kelley)
- Gathered (2019)
- Cocoon (2020)
- Howe Gelb's Schlager Christmas Album (2022)

=== The Band of Blacky Ranchette ===
- The Band of Blacky Ranchette (1985)
- Heartland (1986)
- Sage Advice (1990)
- Still Lookin' Good to Me (2003)

=== OP8 ===
- Slush (1997)

=== The Colorist Orchestra & Howe Gelb ft. Pieta Brown ===
- Not on the Map (2021)

== Filmography ==
- Drunken Bees (1996) – Giant Sand documentary by Marianne Dissard
- Looking for a Thrill: An Anthology of Inspiration (2005) – Howe Gelb interviewed
- High and Dry: Where the Desert Meets Rock and Roll (2006) – documentary which includes music and interviews with Giant Sand members
- This Band Has No Members (2006) – Howe Gelb solo concert film of his Japan tour in 2005
- Ingenious (2009) - feature film soundtrack
- Jackie (2012) - actor ("Paul")
- Quantum Cowboys (2022) - actor ("Blacky"), writer, music; winner Best Original Music Award, Annecy International Animated Film Festival (2022)
