= Rainer Ptacek =

Guitarist (1951–1997)

Background information
- Also known as: Rainer
- Born: Rainer Jaromir Ptaček; June 7, 1951; East Berlin, East Germany
- Died: November 12, 1997 (aged 46) Tucson, Arizona, US
- Genres: Blues, blues-rock, New Acoustic, contemporary folk, Americana, American primitive guitar
- Occupations: Musician, singer-songwriter
- Instrument: Guitar
- Years active: 1970s–1997
- Website: Rainer official website

Rainer Ptacek, also known mononymously as Rainer (June 7, 1951 – November 12, 1997), was a German-American guitarist and singer-songwriter based in Tucson, Arizona for much of his adult life. His guitar technique, which incorporated slide, finger-picking, tape loops and electronic manipulation, earned him the admiration of notable musicians such as Robert Plant and Billy Gibbons.

== Early life and career ==
Ptacek was born in East Berlin to a family of Czech and German descent. His family fled East Germany for the United States when he was five years old. They eventually settled in Chicago, where young Ptacek was first exposed to blues music. He moved to Tucson in the early 1970s, where he began his own musical career, most often solo, but sometimes he plugged in and led a trio as Rainer & Das Combo. He co-founded Giant Sandworms with Howe Gelb in the late 1970s. When the band decided to move to New York and became Giant Sand, Ptacek opted to stay in Tucson to make sure that he would not disrupt his then-new family. Although he never became well known in the United States, he became more and more recognized in Europe. ZZ Top guitarist Billy Gibbons was so impressed with the singer-guitarist that he arranged to have Kurt Loder review Ptacek's The Mush Mind Blues cassette in Rolling Stone. Ptacek later traveled to Houston at the invitation of Billy Gibbons to record at Gibbons' Gold Star Sound Services studio which saw release as The Texas Tapes gaining international attention. Robert Plant, similarly impressed, flew Ptacek to England for the sessions for B-sides to supplement the singles from Fate of Nations.

== Illness and death ==
In February 1996, after suffering a seizure while riding his bike to work, Ptacek was diagnosed with a brain tumor. He described his frustrating symptoms to his friend, Fred Mills, lamenting that he could no longer "remember all of [the] chords and notes" to his music.

Ptacek, who was uninsured, was overwhelmed by his mounting medical expenses. Howe Gelb and Robert Plant organized recording sessions for a charity album, titled The Inner Flame – A Tribute to Rainer Ptacek. The album featured Ptacek-penned songs performed by Gelb (with Giant Sand), Page and Plant, Robert Plant, Emmylou Harris, John Wesley Harding, Evan Dando, Victoria Williams, Mark Olson, Vic Chesnutt, PJ Harvey, John Parish, The Drovers, Madeleine Peyroux, Chuck Prophet, Jonathan Richman, Lucinda Williams, Grandaddy, Calexico, Chris Whitley, and Bill Janovitz. Ptacek participated on many of the tracks.

Intense chemotherapy sessions put his tumor into remission, and Ptacek's musical skills and creativity both returned. He resumed a vigorous touring schedule, beginning with a guest performance at Greg Brown's show in November 1996. By this time, media attention was more focused on him than ever before. On December 17, 1996, he performed a show for 300 doctors, nurses, and patients at the hospital where he was being treated. Just when it seemed as though he had beaten his disease, it returned in October 1997, and he died three weeks later at age 46.

== Discography ==
- Avid Demo List (circa 1979, cassette)
- The Mush Mind Blues (1983, with Das Combo, cassette)
- Live Downtown (1985, with Das Combo, cassette)
- Barefoot Rock with Rainer and Das Combo (released on LP in 1986, re-issued on CD in 1994)
- Worried Spirits (1992)
- The Texas Tapes (1993, with Das Combo)
- D.Y.O. Boot (1995)
- Nocturnes (1995)
- Rainulator (1996, cassette)
- The Inner Flame: Rainer Ptacek Tribute (tribute and benefit album, released in 1997)
- Alpaca Lips (released 2000)
- Live at the Performance Center (released 2001)
- The Farm (released 2002)
- 17 Miracles (2005, collection)
- The Rainer Collection (2006, collection)
- The Westwood Sessions, Volume I (with Das Combo, released November 2007)
- Roll Back The Years (with Joey Burns & John Convertino, released May 2011)
