= Victoria Williams =

American musician (born 1958)

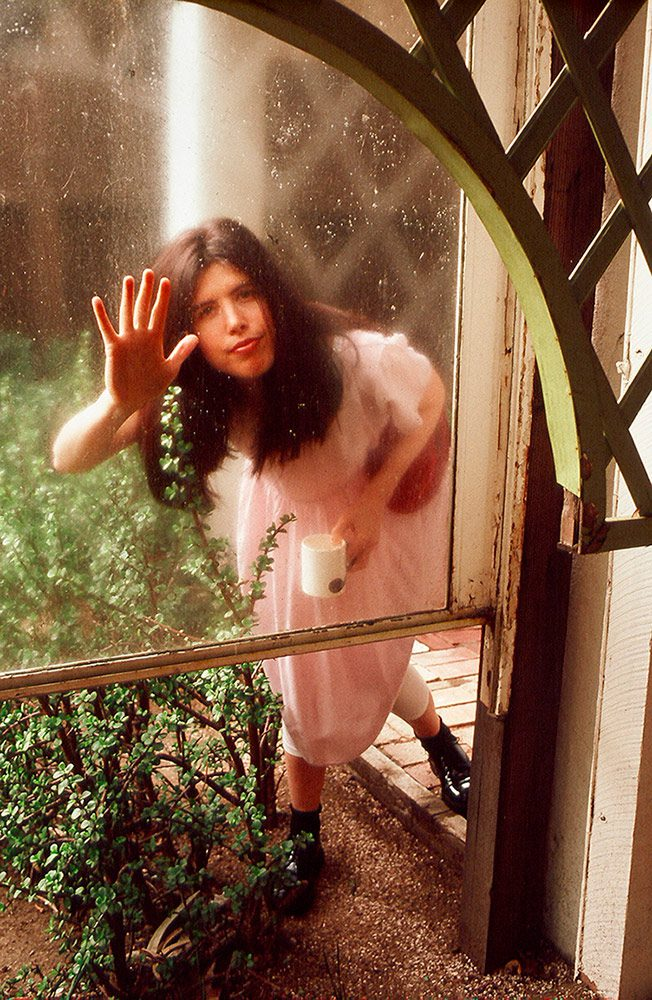
- Williams c. 1990

Background information
- Born: December 23, 1958 (age 67); Shreveport, Louisiana, US
- Genres: Folk; folk rock; country; alternative country
- Occupations: Musician; songwriter
- Instruments: Vocals; guitar
- Years active: 1986–present
- Labels: Geffen; Rough Trade; Mammoth; Atlantic; Dualtone; Thirsty Ear
- Spouses: Peter Case (div. 1989) Mark Olson (m. 1993; div. 2006)

Victoria Williams (born December 23, 1958) is an American singer, songwriter, and musician, from Shreveport, Louisiana, although she has resided in Southern California throughout her musical career. Diagnosed with multiple sclerosis in the early 1990s, Williams was the catalyst for the Sweet Relief Musicians Fund.

== Biography ==
Williams was born in Shreveport, Louisiana. In 1986, she worked with then-husband Peter Case on his debut album, following a year later with her own debut, Happy Come Home, produced by Anton Fier, with an accompanying 28 minute documentary by D. A. Pennebaker. In 1990, she released Swing the Statue. She also often appeared onstage and on record with the band Giant Sand. In 1993, she acted in Gus Van Sant's Even Cowgirls Get the Blues, Van Sant also made the video for "Tarbelly and Featherfoot".

In early 1992, as Williams' career was beginning to take off, she was diagnosed with multiple sclerosis. Because she did not have health insurance, an array of artists, including Pearl Jam, Lou Reed, Maria McKee, Dave Pirner, and Lucinda Williams, recorded some of Williams' songs on CD for a benefit project called Sweet Relief: A Benefit for Victoria Williams. This led to the creation of the Sweet Relief Musicians Fund, a charity that aids professional musicians in need of health care. That year, Williams also released a new album, titled Loose. A second album, covering the songs of Vic Chesnutt, was recorded for the Sweet Relief Fund in 1996 under the title Sweet Relief II: Gravity of the Situation, and Williams performed a duet with Chesnutt on the album.

Also that year, Williams appeared on Strong Hand of Love, a fund-raising tribute album to songwriter Mark Heard, who had died in 1992. That December she participated in a Christmas concert with Jane Siberry, Holly Cole, Mary Margaret O'Hara and Rebecca Jenkins, broadcast over CBC Radio in Canada and National Public Radio in the United States and subsequently released on CD as Count Your Blessings.

In 1995, Williams released her first live album, This Moment in Toronto with the Loose Band. Williams ended the 1990s with an appearance on Jim White's Wrong Eyed Jesus (1997), a duet with Robert Deeble ("Rock a Bye") on Days Like These (1997), and 1998's Musings of a Creek Dipper. She followed with Water to Drink, in 2000, coproduced with JC Hopkins. She also appeared in the film Victoria Williams – Happy Come Home, by D. A. Pennebaker and Chris Hegedus.

Williams recorded "Since I've Laid My Burden Down" for the compilation album Avalon Blues: A Tribute To Mississippi John Hurt in 2001. That same year her song "You Are Loved" was included on The Oxford American Southern Music CD #5 .

In 2002, she issued an album of standards recorded during the sessions for her earlier records. Sings Some Ol' Songs includes classics such as "Somewhere Over the Rainbow", "My Funny Valentine" and "Moon River". That year, Williams was also a judge for the second annual Independent Music Awards to support independent artists' careers.

Throughout her marriage to Jayhawks member Mark Olson, the pair regularly toured and recorded together as The Original Harmony Ridge Creekdippers, The Creekdippers, and Mark Olson and the Creekdippers, releasing a total of seven albums and one "best of" compilation. "Miss Williams' Guitar", a song on the Jayhawks' 1995 album Tomorrow the Green Grass, was written for her by Olson and bandmate Gary Louris. Olson and Williams divorced in 2006 which also led to the dissolution of their musical partnership.

In 2006, she performed on fellow Creekdipper David Wolfenberger's album Portrait of Narcissus and even painted the portrait of Wolfenberger featured on the cover. In that same year, she also appeared as a guest vocalist on Modern Folk and Blues Wednesday, the first solo album by Bob Forrest of Thelonious Monster.

Williams also plays in a band called The Thriftstore Allstars, a group of accomplished touring musicians who regularly play in Joshua Tree, California. The Thriftstore Allstars play what their MySpace page calls "loose drunken square dance country gone electric fantasmo".

In 2006, Williams was ranked No. 89 on Paste magazine's list of the Top 100 Living Songwriters. The description stated: "Louisiana-born Victoria Williams' music paints impressionistic, personal portraits of nature ("Century Plant"), of the spiritual ("Holy Spirit") and of common folk ("Crazy Mary"). Her songs—as distinctive as her high vibrato—dip heavily into the musical palettes of country, folk, rock, gospel and jazz. Although her debut album, Happy Come Home was released in 1987, Williams was largely overlooked until artists like Soul Asylum and Pearl Jam recorded her tunes for the 1993 Sweet Relief tribute/benefit CD, which helped pay medical bills in her battle against multiple sclerosis."

In 2007, she played numerous shows with M. Ward and is featured on the track "Bottom Dollar" on Christopher Rees' album Cautionary Tales (2007).

In early 2009, Williams commenced the recording of a new album of original material in Tucson with Isobel Campbell as record producer. In May 2009, Williams and Olson reunited with fellow Creekdipper Mike Russell for a one-off performance at an exhibition opening being staged at the True World Gallery in Joshua Tree, California. In July 2009, Williams embarked on a tour of Australia and New Zealand with Vic Chesnutt. The tour would be cut short when Chesnutt, who had struggled with depression, died of an overdose of muscle relaxants on December 25, 2009.

In the fall of 2010, Williams toured Spain and Switzerland with Simone White, and in late 2011 she returned to the studio to record another vocal for Robert Deeble for the album Heart Like Feathers which was released in February 2012.

In December 2015, Williams had a seizure, injuring her back and shoulder. Although she was expected to recover fully, the Sweet Relief Musicians Fund was seeking donations to help cover the associated costs, which her medical insurance again would not cover.

== Discography ==
=== Solo albums ===
- Happy Come Home (1987)
- Swing the Statue! (1990)
- Loose (1994)
- This Moment: In Toronto with the Loose Band (1995)
- Musings of a Creek Dipper (1998)
- Water to Drink (2000)
- Sings Some Ol' Songs (2002)
- Victoria Williams & The Loose Band-Town Hall 1995 (2017)

=== Benefit / tribute album ===
- Sweet Relief: A Benefit for Victoria Williams (1993, Thirsty Ear)

=== Other recorded appearances ===
- Peter Case by Peter Case (1986)
- "Don't Let It Bring You Down" and "Words" on the 1989 album The Bridge: A Tribute to Neil Young
- "I'd Be Sleeping If My Baby Were Here" from The Name Above the Title by John Wesley Harding (1991) (cassette only)
- Ramp by Giant Sand (1992)
- Kindness of the World by Joe Henry (1993)
- Count Your Blessings (compilation album) (1994)
- Glum by Giant Sand (1994)
- Orphans and Angels by Julie Miller
- "The Puppy Song" for the 1995 Harry Nilsson tribute album For the Love of Harry: Everybody Sings Nilsson
- Tomorrow the Green Grass by The Jayhawks (1995)
- "What Kind of Friend" for the 1996 Mark Heard tribute album Orphans of God: Thirty-Four Songs Written by Mark Heard Performed by Thirty-Four Artists
- "God Is Good" with Vic Chesnutt, duet on the album Sweet Relief II: Gravity of the Situation (1996)
- Wrong Eyed Jesus by Jim White (1997)
- "Rock A Bye" by Robert Deeble (1997) duet from the album Days Like These
- "Periwinkle Sky" on the 1998 album "Lilith Fair: A Celebration of Women in Music"
- Earthside Down by Robert Deeble (1998) backing vocals
- "It Sure Can Get Cold In Des Moines" for the 1998 tribute album, Real: The Tom T. Hall Project (Sire Records). Backing vocals for Mark Olson
- "Early" by Greg Brown (2002) from Going Driftless: An Artist's Tribute to Greg Brown
- "My Lord and I", a song on the tribute album Shout, Sister, Shout: A Tribute to Sister Rosetta Tharpe (2003)
- "Songs for Oxygen" by Kevin Stetz (2005)
- Do Your Thing by Papa Mali (2007)
- Bottom Dollar by Christopher Rees (2007)
- "Highway 62 Love songs" compilation (2011)
- Leaving Me Dry by Natalie D-Napoleon (2012)
- Heart Like Feathers by Robert Deeble (2012)
- "Change Is Gonna Come", on the album Sweet Relief III: Pennies From Heaven (2013)
- "Distant Light" in the album Your Desert My Mind (2016) by The Mutants
- The Pilgrim's Tale by T. Rex in the album AngelHeaded Hipster: The Songs of Marc Bolan and T.Rex (2020) (with Julian Lennon)
