= Unusual types of gramophone records =

Gramophone records with non standard features

The overwhelming majority of records manufactured have been of certain sizes (7, 10, or 12 inches), playback speeds (33 1/3, 45, or 78 rpm), and appearance (round black discs). However, since the commercial adoption of the gramophone record (called a phonograph record in the U.S., where both cylinder records and disc records were invented), a wide variety of records have also been produced that do not fall into these categories, and they have served a variety of purposes.

Common variances from standard records include pigmented vinyl, disks filled with a substance such as oil, or unusually shaped records. These can alter the appearance and sometimes playability of a record. This is done for a variety of reasons, including as a method of promotion for limited-release albums.

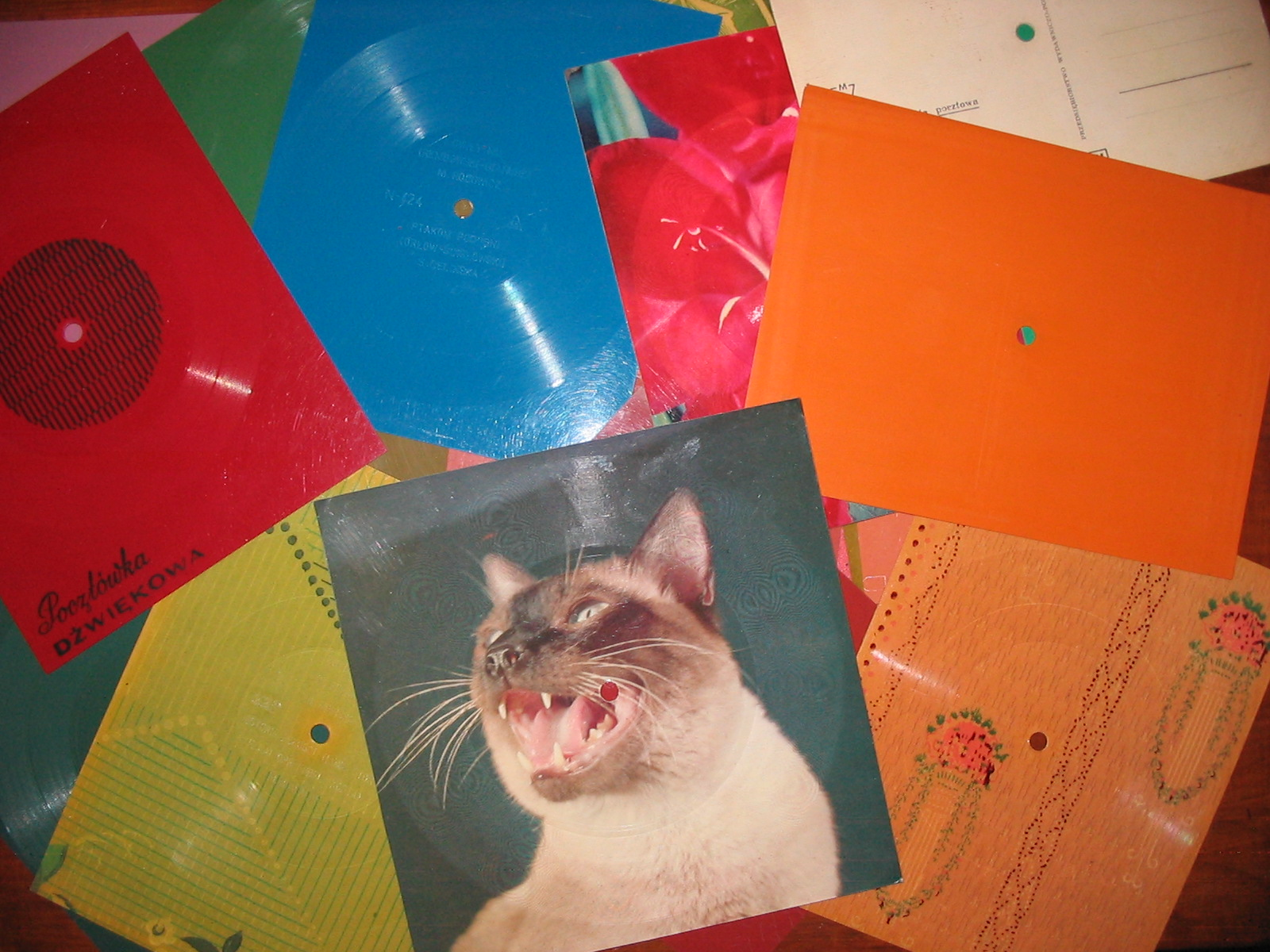
Polish sound postcards, one example of unusual gramophone records (1950s)

== Unusual sizes ==
The most common diameter sizes for gramophone records are 12-inch, 10-inch, and 7-inch (300 mm, 250 mm, and 180 mm). Early American shellac records were all 7-inch until 1901, when 10-inch records were introduced. Twelve-inch records joined them in 1903. By 1910, other sizes were retired and nearly all discs were either 10-inch or 12-inch, although both sizes were normally a bit smaller than their official diameter. In Europe, early 10-inch and 12-inch shellac records were produced in the first three decades of the twentieth century. Seven-inch children's records were sold before World War II, but nearly all were made of fragile shellac, not an ideal material for use by children. In the late 1940s, small plastic records, including some small picture discs, replaced them. Ten-inch children's records were made as well, but the 7-inch size was more compatible with small hands. The 7-inch size was also used for flexi discs which were popular in Japan where they were known as sound-sheets and were often in traditional round format. In other areas, flexi discs were usually square and often included in a magazine (see Unusual materials and uses below).

Numerous unusual diameters have been produced since the early 1900s ranging from 2 to 19.7 inches (51 to 500 mm). Oddly shaped discs were also produced (see Unusually shaped discs below).

Size	Uses
2 in (5.1 cm)	Peabrain zine released a 2" compilation – the ADHD EP – which includes 6 bands from Southampton and Portsmouth (The Shorts, Joythief, Shooting Fish, Black Anchor, Chemical Threat, and Baby Jugglers) who recorded a 10-second song each. It was pressed on green vinyl and limited to 300 copies, each wrapped in a 24-page cover.; Hardcore punk band 2Minute Minor released a 20-second song called Soda Tax on a single-sided 2" lathe cut record, limited to 50 copies. This song is in response to the Cook County Sweetened Beverage Tax where some stores were taxing the drink LaCroix by accident.
3.15 in (8.0 cm)	Also known as "8ban," (for "8cm Bandai") these were developed in Japan by record pressing company Toyokasei and released in "blind-bag" format by toy company Bandai in 2004. They experienced a resurgence in the United States because of the interest of Jack White who released White Stripes singles in this format. Disks in this format continue to be manufactured, particularly in association with Record Store Day during which 3" singles are made available exclusively through participating stores.
4.7 in (12 cm)	120 mm records. Techno artist Jeff Mills released the single for "The Occurrence" on a disc that is a gramophone record on one side, and a compact disc on the other. Although dubbed a 5-inch record, to be usable in most compact disc players, the record can be no bigger than 120 mm or about 4.7".
5 in (13 cm)	Between 1888 and ca. 1892–1894, Emile Berliner recorded a few 5" records under the toy company Krammer & Reinhardt.; In 1980, the British band Squeeze released a 5-inch 33 1/3 RPM vinyl recording of "If I Didn't Love You", backed with "Another Nail In My Heart" (A&M Records AM-1616 / SP-4802). Due to space restrictions of the grooves, both songs were mixed as monaural.; Underground hardcore punk bands in the 1990s started releasing EPs on all sizes of vinyl including 5 inches in size.; Children's records were manufactured in this size from the early 1900s all the way up to the late 1950s (Spear, Lincoln, Little John, Robin Hood, Simon Says, etc.); Little Wonder Records was perhaps the most successful, curious and now most commonly found small-format disc, produced as a discount alternative between 1914 and 1923. Its performers were uncredited, but paralleled duplication of longer recordings on more common 10" discs, and appearing to exclusively employ Columbia recording artists. They were not children's records. Little Wonder in some cases recorded unusual artists, such as ragtime vocalist Gene Greene and African-American late/ragtime/early-jazz clarinetist Wilbur Sweatman.
6 in (15 cm)	Children's records – 6-inch Little Golden Records made of bright yellow plastic were a common sight in children's playrooms in the United States from the late 1940s to the early 1960s. The 78 rpm speed was used for some children's records of all sizes well into the 1960s, as nearly all record players still included it and it allowed an old disused 78-only player to be put to work as a toy, expendable if it got damaged by rough handling.; 6-inch flexi discs – Popular in Japan where they were known as sound-sheets, these releases were often in traditional round format. In other areas, flexi discs were usually square and often included in a magazine (see Unusual materials and uses below). For example, the American magazine National Geographic's January 1979 issue included a 6-inch flexi disc of whale sounds called "Songs of the Humpback Whale." With a production order of 10.5 million, it became the largest single press run of any record at the time.
7 inch (17 cm)	Between 1892 and 1900, the Berliner Gramophone Company released 7" records, to be played with a recently upgraded Gram-O-Phone reproducing machine. The descendants of its legacy (Gramophone Company in Europe and Victor in US) continued issuing 7" plates for a few years.
8 in (20 cm)	Early American shellac records – Prior to 1910, Victor introduced 8-inch records to replace their inexpensive 7-inch product, but they were soon discontinued. A similar scenario occurred in Europe for Emerson and Melodiya discs.; The F.W. Woolworth Company test marketed 8-inch records on their own Electradisk label, made by RCA Victor, in New York City in 1932. Priced at 10 cents, they were replaced by a 10-inch Electradisk later that year, priced at 20 cents.; 8-inch EPs – Mostly seen as Japanese pressed records in the 1980s and 1990s, and after 1992 in the US (one record plant started producing them after then).; 8-inch flexi discs – Popular in Japan where they were known as sound-sheets, these releases were often in traditional round format. In other areas, flexi discs were usually square and often included in a magazine (see Unusual materials below).; The Red Sea by Isis; Kind Glaze by Caboladies
8.3 in (21 cm)	European shellac records – In the first three decades of the twentieth century European companies including Pathé, Odeon, and Fonotipia made recordings in a variety of sizes, including 21 cm.
9 in (23 cm)	Early American shellac records – Prior to 1910, nine-inch brown shellac records were issued under the Zon-O-Phone label. Emerson Records made nine inch black shellac records in the second half of the 1910s, these also appeared on client labels such as Medallion.; 9-inch flexi discs – Popular in Japan where they were known as sound-sheets, these releases were often in traditional round format. In other areas, flexi discs were usually square and often included in a magazine (see Unusual materials below).; Popular industrial music group Nine Inch Nails released a limited-edition series of 9-inch discs to aid in promoting the single "March of the Pigs" from their full length 1994 album The Downward Spiral. The record featured two songs on the first side, and an etching of the album's promotional logo (a coiled centipede) on the second side.; The Seeburg 1000 background music system (1959 to mid-1980s) used 9-inch, 16-rpm records with an unusual 2-inch center hole. Each record had a capacity of about 40 minutes per side.
9.8 in (25 cm)	European shellac records – In the first three decades of the twentieth century European companies including Pathé, Odeon, and Fonotipia made recordings in a variety of sizes, including 25 cm.
10.6 in (27 cm)	European shellac records – In the first three decades of the twentieth century European companies including Pathé, Odeon, and Fonotipia made recordings in a variety of sizes, including 27 cm.; Edison Diamond Discs were of around 10 inch on average
11 in (28 cm)	UK goth band Alien Sex Fiend were the first band to release an 11-inch record in October 1984.; Some 78 rpm stamper/test plates were pressed using bigger shellac cakes than the final product (possibly to minimise damage if the outer edge of the plate broke before starting production), being the most notable example Bix Beiderbecke's "Thou Swell" take A, where in a small fragment of the outer rim can be found the only recorded instance of Bix's voice.
11.4 in (29 cm)	European shellac records – In the first three decades of the twentieth century European companies including Pathé, Odeon, and Fonotipia made recordings in a variety of sizes, including 29 cm.
13 in (33 cm)	Underground hardcore punk bands in the 1990s started releasing EPs on all sizes of vinyl including 13 inches in size.
13.8 in (35 cm)	European shellac records – In the first three decades of the twentieth century European companies including Pathé, Odeon, and Fonotipia made recordings in a variety of sizes, including 35 cm.
14 in (36 cm)	Early American shellac records – Between 1903 and 1910, American companies made recordings of 14-inch records that played at the unusual speed of 60 rpm. The 14-inch size was soon abandoned.
16 in (41 cm)	Early Pathé "Cinéma" mood music was recorded in 16 inch shellac records.; Phonoscène - 16-inch discs were used, but also 12-inch and 10-inch discs, as part of an early sound-film system made by Léon Gaumont. The discs were synchronised to a motion picture film, and were played on a Chronophone.; Vitaphone "talking pictures" – 16-inch discs playing at 33 1/3 rpm provided the sound in the Vitaphone "talking picture" system developed in the mid-1920s, the first use of the 33 1/3 rpm speed.; Early radio broadcasting – In radio broadcasting, 16-inch 33 1/3 rpm discs—shellac in the early 1930s, but vinyl in later years—were used to distribute "electrical transcriptions" of prerecorded programming. Radio stations also made their own 16-inch lacquer ("acetate") disc recordings in-house to delay the broadcast of live network feeds or to prerecord some of their own local programming. These "standard groove" discs used roughly the same large groove dimensions and spacing found on 78 rpm records and typically played for about 15 minutes per side, with very good fidelity—when heard over the air, indistinguishable from live to a casual, but not to a critical listener. Old 16-inch turntables are sometimes still found in radio broadcast studios, but it is now very unlikely that any disc larger than 12-inch will ever be played on them.; Early classical recordings – Some early classical LPs were dubbed from recordings which had been mastered on 16-inch lacquer discs in anticipation of eventual release in a smaller "microgroove" format.
19.7 in (50 cm)	European shellac records – In the first three decades of the twentieth century European companies including Pathé, Odeon, and Fonotipia made recordings in a variety of sizes, including 50 cm.

== Unusual speeds ==
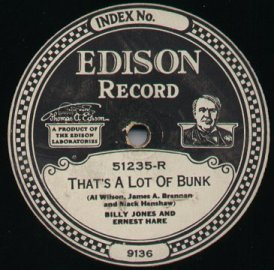
In the early 1920s, the Edison Records "Diamond Disc" label – here featuring the popular duo of Billy Jones and Ernest Hare – were intended for playback at 80 rpm.

The earliest record players were purely mechanical devices with no amplification. The sonic energy was simply the amount of drag that the needle could place on the spinning disk. Consequently, high speeds such as 78 rpm were needed to drive the trumpet horn to reasonable volume. Once electronic amplification became accessible, slower speeds and the use of finer needles replaced 78 rpm disks.

Mechanical players could function without electronic amplifiers.

The most common rotational speed for gramophone records became 78 revolutions per minute (rpm). Established as the only common rotational speed prior to the 1940s, the 78 became increasingly less common throughout the 1950s and into more modern decades as the 33 and the 45 became established as the new standards for albums and singles respectively. Throughout the history of the recording industry, numerous speeds ranging from 3 to 130 rpm have been utilized for a variety of purposes:

Turn speed	Uses
3 rpm	On 28 March 2012, Jack White held a party to celebrate the third anniversary of his Nashville label/record store Third Man Records. The attendees were each given a copy of an LP entitled The First Three Years of Blue Series Singles On One LP at 3 RPM. It consists of 57 songs by 29 bands previously released on Third Man's Blue Series 7-inch single line compiled on one blue vinyl 12-inch record, mastered at 3 rpm (approximately one eleventh of standard LP speed) as a further expression of White's obsession with the number 3. In reality though, if one synchronizes this 'catalog' LP with the various CDs containing the music recorded at the correct speed, they will discover that the record in question was actually mastered to play back properly at 4 1/6 rpm. However, as no recording lathe can engrave a record accurately at such a slow speed, in actuality the disc was mastered at four-times speed or 16 rpm with the program material similarly being played at quadruple speed.
4 1/6 rpm	Audiobooks for the blind. In 1966, experiments were conducted by the American Printing House for the Blind in cooperation with the American Foundation for the Blind to create extra-high density discs so that a book or magazine could be contained on fewer records. Test pressings were made at the normal 12-inch and 10-inch sizes in addition to the 7-inch sizes noted below for both 8 1/3 as well as 16 2/3. However, with mastering facilities of the period only going as low as 16 rpm, the quadruple-speed mastering required to get a playback speed of 4 rpm was deemed to have an insufficient audio quality. The highest successful density tested for in the experiment was 10 hours on one side of a 12-inch disc although it was surmised by engineers that this could be extended to 12 hours per side if needed. No books or periodicals were ever produced in the format, and it is not known if any of the experimental discs survive into the modern age.
8 1/3 rpm	Audiobooks for the blind – Beginning in 1969, 8 1/3 rpm records began to be produced (normally in 10-inch format, although 12-inch and 7-inch discs were also produced). This recording format's development was sponsored by the American Foundation for the Blind. One 10-inch record holds four hours of speech with the 12-inch variety holding six hours and the 7-inch variety holding roughly 90 minutes. The format was later used to distribute magazines on nine-inch "flexible discs" recorded at the same 8 1/3 rpm. These discs were made of thin plastic and were literally flexible, similar to an overhead projector transparency sheet. The first magazine to be circulated widely in the flexible disc format to blind individuals was U.S. News & World Report. The National Library Service for the Blind ceased using analog discs as a format for audio book and magazine distribution in 2001.
16 2/3 rpm	Spoken word records – The 16 2/3 rpm speed was used almost exclusively for spoken word content, in particular for earlier versions of the "talking books" used by the visually impaired, though it was also employed in the Seeburg 1000 Background Music System. For this reason, the inclusion of a 16 2/3 speed setting on turntables became standard roughly between the mid-1950s and very early 1970s despite the records themselves being a rarity. Cassette tapes proved to be a far more popular format for such spoken content. 16 2/3 rpm talking books require a 0.5 (half) mil stylus to avoid being destroyed. Each side of a 7" disc ran for almost half an hour. The Audio Book Company was therefore able to publish the entire New Testament as a book consisting of 26 7" records for a total running time of approximately 24 hours. The Old Testament was also published as a talking book of 26 discs, although it only contained nine complete Books. This was apparently known as the famous "Talking Bible". In 1960, they published Walt Whitman's "Leaves of Grass" as a 6-disc book running 5 1/2 hours, consisting of 64 complète poems, including "Song of Myself" which ran for approximately 2 hours.; Chrysler's short-lived Highway Hi-Fi format also used 16 2/3 7-inch discs. Some manufacturers of very low-speed discs such as Highway Hi-Fi used shallow and narrow "ultra-microgrooves," requiring a 0.25 mil stylus – modern styluses of 0.7–1.0 mil will damage these fine grooves.; 12-inch albums of classical music were also published in the late 1950s to early 1960s, not to mention recordings of steam locomotives. In 1957, Vox published a first album of Tchaikovsky in the US as part of its projected XL series (for Extra Long), playable with a regular LP needle but running at least twice as long. In France, the A.Charlin Disques label published all its initial releases as 16 2/3 12" albums (of ancient music) around 1961. Listening to these recordings today (at the right speed) is somewhat strange, because while the music is of normal high-fidélity, the surface noise plays at half-speed, thus an octave lower.; The audio portion of the Voyager Golden Record was mastered for playback at 16 2/3 rpm.; Another notable example of a "16 RPM" record was a 7-inch single of the song Orouburous by drone band Earth.; The Prestige Jazz double-album MONO series are 12-inch 16-rpm discs. They can be played with a normal mono or stereo stylus (0.7 to 1.0 mil) stylus without damage.
24 rpm	Talking books for the blind in Europe. During the same period, especially in the UK, producers manufactured this speed prior to the days when 16 rpm could provide intelligible voice recognition quality over repeated plays.; Dictation records in the U.S. such as the Edison Voicewriter which recorded on thin flexible plastic discs.
60-75 rpm	Pre-standardization period – Before 1930, particularly before 1925, a number of proprietary formats existed, with recordings made at speeds including 60 rpm (although most were between 72 and 82 rpm).. Most notably, the Berliner Gramophone Company recorded their plates at variable speeds (due to a crude hand-cranking mechanism, later substituted for an inefficient single-spring motor), usually ranging between 68 and 72 rpm.
73.29 rpm	Pre-standardization period – Before the 78 rpm was considered a worldwide standard, Victor and Gramophone Company records were often recorded at 73.29 rpm.
76 rpm	Pre-standardization period – Between 1901 and ca. 1908, the Columbia Graphophone Company recorded single-sided plates at a speed of around 76 rpm.
80 rpm	Edison Disc Records/ – Standardized to run at 80 rpm, these records were vertically cut, 1/4 inch thick with a core of wood flour and, later, china clay.; Pre-standardization period – Before complying to the standard in ca. 1927, records made by the Columbia Graphophone Company in ca. 1908 and later were recorded at around 80 rpm. Acoustically recorded Odeon plates may also be found to be recorded at 80 rpm (also in 1927 and before).
130 rpm	Pre-standardization period – Before 1930, particularly before 1925, a number of proprietary formats existed, with recordings made at speeds including 130 rpm (although most were between 72 and 82 rpm).

=== Varying and variable play-speeds ===
At least one attempt to lengthen playing time was made in the early 1920s. World Records produced records that played at a constant linear velocity, controlled by Noel Pemberton Billing's patented add-on speed governor. These longer-playing records had speeds measured in inches per second (but specified on the label by a letter from A to D) rather than revolutions per minute. If the sound quality near the label of an ordinary record was considered acceptable, then playing time could be greatly increased by using that same groove-to-needle velocity throughout the recording. This is known as the CLV (constant linear velocity) format, as opposed to the usual CAV (constant angular velocity) format. The World Record Controller was an attachment for ordinary record players that slowed the turntable down when playing the outside of the record and allowed it to gradually speed up as the needle was carried inward by the groove. Of course, only special World records could be used. The World system was a commercial failure. The principle, first proposed in a fundamental U.S. sound recording patent in 1886, was briefly revived in 1939–1940 for the unusual "Cinematone Penny Phono" jukebox (price to play one selection: one cent), which used it to squeeze ten short recordings of current pop songs onto each side of one 12-inch record. Compact discs and DVDs use the CLV format to make efficient use of their surface areas.

The CLV format would reemerge in the 1940s and 1950s in office dictation machines known as the Gray Audograph and the CGS/Memovox, which combined it with the flexible-disc format and the inside-out recording format used by CDs today. Both machines recorded at a fixed pitch, but the Grey Audograph could only record at one linear speed allowing 15 minutes per side of a 7-inch disc. The CGS or Memovox, on the other hand, had a High Fidelity speed as well as a Speech speed, allowing over two hours of recording time per side on a 12-inch disc.

In the 1970s, Atlantic Records started producing a series of albums later designated on a label known as Syntonic Research. Each album consisted of two full-side tracks, usually at least half an hour long per side, of sounds recorded of various locations. For example, one side would have ocean waves crashing against the shore and the other would have the sounds of birds chattering away in an aviary; another record might have frogs, crickets and birds making their usual vocalizations that were heard in the early morning hours of a swamp or lake. There were a few dozen made. These were mostly used for soundscape or relaxation purposes. The first album in the series noted on its back cover that either side could be enjoyed in stereo at any playing speed (from 45 rpm to 16 2/3 rpm) depending on the effect desired by the person playing the record.

=== Microgrooved 78s ===
The first instance of what could be considered a "microgroove" record could be traced back to the 1920s. More exactly, in 1926 the Edison Phonograph Company released a "Long-Playing" Diamond Disc, that could reproduce up to 12 minutes (10 inch) or 20 minutes (12 inch) per side, thanks to an increase in the density of grooves per cm (totalling to ca. 450 TPI). Nevertheless, the fragility and hyper-specificity of the new format proved them to be commercially unsuccessful, and only 14 different records were ever released.

Microgrooved 78 rpm vinyl records were being issued regularly in the USSR for approximately 10 years, starting from ca. 1950. These were labeled as "Long play record", with the correct speed (78 rpm) specified on the label.

In Québec, the Stàrr label (pressed by the Compo Co.), issued many (microgrooved) double-length 10" 78s featuring two complete songs per side, during the early 1930s. These consisted mainly of reissues of older 78s. The surviving copies are usually severely worn.

A small number of 78 rpm microgroove vinyl recordings have been issued by smaller and underground performers, mainly as novelty items, from the 1970s to the present. In 2006, the Belfast singer Duke Special released a number of ten inch EPs in 78 rpm. A series of 78 rpm microgroove records was issued by the "Audiophile" label during the early LP era. They were supposed to provide higher quality sound than 33 rpm by virtue of their faster rotation speed combined while also providing significantly longer playing time than standard groove 78 rpm records. In 2011, to celebrate Record Store Day, Capitol Records released a 78 rpm Microgroove record of The Beach Boys, containing the songs "Good Vibrations" and "Heroes And Villains". In 2019, Rivermount Records released an audiophile 78 rpm microgroove record, containing 4 classic Dixieland jazz songs, as recorded by The Chicago Cellar Boys.

== Unusually long playing times ==
Early LP records rarely exceeded 45 minutes per disc (both sides combined), with a limit in later years of 52 minutes, due to mastering issues.

By the 1960s–1970s, some records began to exceed the 52-minute limitation, with single albums going to as long as 90 minutes in some cases. However, such records had to be cut with much narrower spacing between the grooves, which led to a much lower dynamic range, and meant that playing the record with a worn needle could damage the record. It also resulted in a much quieter sound.

Spoken word, comedy and sound effects albums, not having a wide range of musical instrumentation to reproduce, can be cut with much narrower spacing between the grooves, resulting in lengths considerably in excess of 52 minutes, and materials distributed on 10-inch discs by the National Library Service for the Blind and Physically Handicapped in the 1960s, for instance, commonly reached 90 minutes per disc at 16 2/3 rpm and 180 minutes per disc at 8 1/3 rpm.

A few examples of unusually long albums are listed below:

Length (per disc)	Year	Album	Notes
43:12	1962	Beethoven's 9th Symphony	Karajan's 1962 recording of the 9th Symphony has the second and third movements sharing a side, resulting in a side 27 minutes and 42 seconds.
50:28	1976	Faithful	The B-side on this Todd Rundgren album clocks in at 27 minutes and 55 seconds.
50:33	1984	Red Sails in the Sunset	The B-side on this Midnight Oil release clocks in at over the standard 26 minutes by 13 seconds.
52:01	1964	Funny Girl (Original Broadway Cast Recording)	The A-side of this cast recording clocks in at 34 minutes and 21 seconds.
53:20	1966	Aftermath	Both sides of the UK version of this Rolling Stones release exceed 26 minutes in length.
54:07	1975	Discreet Music	The A-side of this 1975 Brian Eno album exceeds 30 minutes.
55:06	1980	Duke	Both sides of this Genesis release exceed 27 minutes.
55:56	1973	A Wizard, a True Star	The second side of this 1973 Todd Rundgren album reaches 29 minutes and 39 seconds.
56:13	1976	Desire	The second side of this 1976 Bob Dylan album is just shy of 30 minutes.
57:11	1992	Little Earthquakes	Tori Amos' debut album. Each side surpasses 27 minutes of music.
59:13	1975	Timewind	Side A of this 1975 album by Klaus Schulze is over 30 minutes long, and side B is over 28 minutes long.
59:15	1974	Todd Rundgren's Utopia	Todd Rundgren and Utopia's self-titled 1974 debut. The B-side of this album, consisting only of the song "The Ikon", lasts 30 minutes and 27 seconds.
59:49	1971	UFO 2: Flying	29:40 in the A-side and 30:09 in the B-side.
60:03	1982	Hex Enduction Hour	Side A of this album by The Fall lasts 30:41, while side B lasts 29:22
60:16	1991	On Every Street	Side A of this Dire Straits release lasts 30:34, while side B lasts 29:42
62:32	1987	Hysteria	Def Leppard's 1987 album has side A clocking in at 31:57, while side B clocks in at 30:32.
63:05	1991	Gold	Steely Dan's second compilation album was reissued in 1991 with bonus tracks. The album front cover proclaims "Over 60 Minutes Worth of Music".
64:07	1974	Get Up with It	Miles Davis' 1974 double album has a playtime of 124:15 over four sides. Each side surpasses 27 minutes of music.
67:32	1975	Initiation	Todd Rundgren's 1975 album totals 67:32 over two sides.
69:07	1987	Into the Woods	Original Broadway Cast released by RCA Victor in 1987, this album has a side A lasting 37:50 and a side B lasting 31:17.
69:12	1981	The Comic Strip	Released by Springtime Records in 1981, this album has a side A lasting 38:04 and a side B lasting 31:08.
71:10	1976	Passport	Both Sides on this Nana Mouskouri album exceed 30 minutes of music on each side.
71:46	1980	Tears and Laughter	This 1980 compilation album by Johnny Mathis exceeds 71 minutes in length on one disc.
74:00	1974	Environments	The albums in this 1974 LP series were between 30:00 and 37:00 per side.
75:40	1978	Osmose	Disc two of this double LP by Ariel Kalma & Richard Tinti is rainforest sounds of Borneo, all high frequencies, with Side A being 39:40 long and B being 36:00.
78:17	1974	Dream House 78′ 17″	This La Monte Young release has two sides with each just under 40 minutes.
92:28	1974	90 Minutes with Arthur Fiedler and the Boston Pops	Arthur Fiedler's 1976 LP made by Radio Shack.
114:45	1973	J.S. Bach - Version Intégrale	French classical music record label Magnetic Disc Recording allowed classical listeners to enjoy suites and longer pieces uninterrupted by using a proprietary method to remove the space between grooves on a record. Roughly 30 Trimicron LPs exist, with most holding nearly 1 hour per side of vinyl. This Johann Sebastian Bach compilation containing all 6 Brandenburg Concertos on one disc is of typical length for the Trimicron series.

== Unusual holes ==
The vast majority of records used a standard small spindle hole slightly more than 1/4 in (6.4 mm) in diameter. The only common exception to this is the 7-inch 45 rpm record, which was designed with a center hole slightly more than 1 1/2 in (38 mm) in diameter both for convenience in handling and to accommodate a very fast record-changing mechanism contained inside a correspondingly large spindle, as implemented in RCA Victor's early stand-alone "45" players. The spindle and any records stacked on it rotated with the turntable, so that each waiting disc was already up to speed before it dropped. Large mechanized spindle adaptors were supplied with most multi-speed automatic record changers sold in the 1950s and 1960s, but they were not as fast and efficient. The large hole also facilitates use in jukeboxes, which mechanically place the "45" onto a turntable with a conical spindle having a matching diameter at its base, making the placement operation easier, safer, and surer than it was with the small-diameter holes and spindles in 78 rpm jukeboxes.

Most 7-inch records in the US continue to be pressed with a large hole, requiring an adapter to be used on standard turntables. In other territories such as Europe, 7-inch records intended for home use have standard-sized holes. Many such 7-inch records had a center which could be easily snapped out, yielding a record with a larger hole to be used in jukeboxes or certain record-stacking players; this approach was common in the United Kingdom from the 1950s until the early 1980s, with standard, solid centres becoming gradually more common. Some 7-inch singles in the early-mid-1990s had large holes also, but this was a rarity.

Early on, some 78 rpm records had larger holes in freebie marketing schemes that sold a phonograph cheaply, but required purchase of compatible discs at full price.

Spindle hole size	Uses
1/2 in (13 mm)	Standard Records had a half-inch hole.
3/4 in (19 mm)	Harmony Disc Records had a 3/4-inch center hole.
1 1/2 in (38 mm)	United had a 1 1/2-inch hole.
2 in (51 mm)	Seeburg 1000 records have a 2-inch center hole.
3 in (76 mm)	Aretino had a three-inch hole.; The 3-inch spindle format would be resurrected some 40 years later for the Holy Bible Old and New Testaments produced at 16 RPM by the Audio Book Company of St. Joseph, Michigan. The rarest edition comes with a fibreboard insert to adapt the 3-inch hole of the vinylite discs to a standard phonograph hole.

=== Multi-hole records ===
Some records had more than one hole in the label area. Early Zonophone records (essentially Berliner Gramophone pirated copies) employed a second spindle hole just outside the centre rim to guarantee that the records didn't slip because of the felt turntable carpet (early gramophone machines were very harsh on the records, so engineers had to make them very abrasive and resistant to being tracked, which decreased sound quality in the long run). Busy Bee, in a marketing scheme similar to Standard, would employ a second cut-out area. This allowed the Busy Bee disc to also be played on a standard phonograph in addition to the proprietary format sold by the O'Neill-James Company.

Many blank acetate discs have multiple holes (usually three or four) intended to prevent slippage during cutting.

NON's Pagan Muzak (Gray Beat, 1978) is a one-sided 7-inch with multiple locked grooves and two center holes, meaning each locked groove can be played at two different trajectories as well as any number of speeds. The original release came with instructions for the listener to drill more holes in the record as they saw appropriate. Later pressings of the release were made only with one standard center spindle hole.

== Unusual grooves ==
=== "Trimicron" discs ===
Developed in the mid-1970s by the firm MDR (Magnetic Disc Recording), the Trimicron record enjoyed a brief success. The principle was to remove the empty space between each groove. On average, this empty space is as wide as two grooves, and because of this, its removal effectively triples the duration of the recording that could be engraved (on average, 55 minutes on a 33 rpm record). The Trimicron process was created by Dr. Rabe, a music lover working in his spare time. It was intended for classical music listeners who could not stand having to flip a record in the middle of a piece. For example, all six Brandenburg concertos could fit on one Trimicron record.

However, this process suffered from a major problem: the finer groove decreased the dynamics and the level of recorded signal by nearly 40 percent. It is therefore necessary to play Trimicron records on silent, high performance turntables, equipped with new diamonds and very high performance. Almost 30 Trimicron records were released, though copies are nowadays rare, especially in good condition.

=== Multiple bands ===
Some records are cut with completely independent bands on the same side. In this case, the bands appear as separate tracks on the record and are not intertwined as with parallel grooves. This has most often been used on educational records but is also sometimes used on discs of commercial pop and rock music. These individual bands need not be cut at the same speed. The second Moby Grape album Wow/Grape Jam (1968) has this setup. Following the fourth song on side one there is a spoken announcement telling the listener to change the speed from 33 to 78 rpm to play the next band of the disc. To play the last song on the side the listener must pick up the stylus from the record, change the speed, then put the stylus at the start of the fifth and final song on side one.

The Gorillaz debut album, like the CD release, features the remix of "Clint Eastwood" as a bonus track but the LP has a recorded locked groove after what is meant to be the final track of the album so the needle has to be physically lifted and moved to play the bonus track.

This concept has been extended to the production of records consisting entirely of circular multiple bands to provide collections of infinite loop sound samples of duration limited to one revolution of the disc. Notable examples of this are the releases from RRRecords of the 7-inch RRR-100 (with 100 individual bands) and the 12-inch RRR-500 (with 500 bands) and RRR-1000 (with 1,000 bands.)

=== Sound recorded in locked grooves ===
Most records have a locked groove at the end of each side or individual band. It is usually a silent loop that keeps the needle and tonearm from drifting into the label area. However, it is possible to record sound in this groove, and some artists have included looping audio in the locked groove.

One of the best-known examples of this technique was The Beatles' Sgt. Pepper's Lonely Hearts Club Band (1967). Many UK copies featured a multi-layered collage of randomized chatter in their run-off loops. However, two variations were made: the original British pressing (black label with gold logo) has the "inner groove" play through the entire locked groove and does not include the laughter at the beginning of the piece. The re-issue of the British pressing (black label with silver logo) starts playing the "inner groove" long before the needle reaches the locked groove, includes the laughter and, once the needle hits the locked groove, the listener only hears the last two seconds of the piece played over and over again.

After The Beatles many other musicians experimented with locked run-out grooves, including The Who's The Who Sell Out (1967), Pink Floyd's Atom Heart Mother (1970), Gong's Camembert Electrique (1971), Carla Bley's Escalator over the Hill (1971), Brian Eno's Taking Tiger Mountain (By Strategy) (1974), Lou Reed's Metal Machine Music (1975), This Heat's This Heat (1979) and many others.

The double record of the Outer Wilds soundtrack featured a locked groove on each face of the records. Each locked groove features a different instrument from the song Travelers, which is featured at the end of the game when characters come together to play the song.

=== Sound recorded in lead-in grooves ===
When automatic record changers, auto replay adapters and jukeboxes began appearing in the 1920s the need arose to find a more reliable and forgiving way to accurately direct the stylus to the start of the recorded area as well as signal the end of a performance. Appearing near the outer edge of the record and leading the stylus inward to the performance, Decca introduced the lead-in groove in 1935 in the US, with the industry following soon thereafter. Lead-in groove length, positioning, and motion varied by manufacturer and era, with some moving slower (some requiring several revolutions before encountering audio) and others being very short and jerky. As with the recorded locked groove at the end, it is possible to record sound into the lead-in groove. King Crimson's USA, George Harrison's Wonderwall Music, and the Dead Kennedys' Plastic Surgery Disasters all start in the lead-in groove.

=== Parallel grooves ===
Also known as concentric grooves, it is possible to master recordings with two or more separate, interlaced spiral grooves on a side. Such records have occasionally been made as novelties. There were so-called Puzzle Plates produced by the Gramophone Company in London in 1898 and 1899: these were discs with two interleaved tracks, issued as E5504, 9290, 9296. Their most famous was a three-track Puzzle Plate (9317) given as prize for a competition in 1901, for which many master recordings had to be made, distinguished by suffix letters against the catalogue number. Victor made one as early as 1901. Depending on where the needle is dropped in the lead-in area, it will catch more or less randomly in one of the grooves. Each groove can contain a different recording, so the record "magically" plays one of several different recordings. Victor marketed a few 10-inch 78s with two concentric grooves (called Puzzle Record). Columbia also issued a few 10-inch 78s in 1931 with concentric grooves for their cheap Harmony, Clarion, and Velvet Tone labels. In the blank edge of the record, there was a stamp 'A' and 'B', which indicated where each of the concentric grooves started.

A 1950s RCA Victor 45 rpm single by The Fontane Sisters, "The Fortune Teller Song" offered a song with four different "fortunes" as endings. Due to the space consumed by the multiple grooves, the song itself played for only about one minute. In the 1960s, promoter George Garabedian of Mark 56 Records created a "Magic Record" which would randomly play a tune by Arthur Lyman, The Marathons' novelty song "Peanut Butter," or an imitation Tijuana Brass number. Garabedian's records were made to be given away as premiums, usually by potato chip manufacturers. The opening track of Zacherle's 1962 LP Scary Tales consisted of three parallel grooves of the same song, each containing different lyrics (an assortment of humorous, macabre retellings of Mother Goose rhymes).

A more recent example is Monty Python's Matching Tie and Handkerchief. A promotional EP by Rush, Rush 'n Roulette (mentioned in the book Rare Rock: A Collector's Guide by Tony Rees) had six parallel grooves of different Rush songs. Also Tool's 1992 EP release Opiate featured on the second side a double groove that would either play the first track of side two or the hidden song that was found at the end of the CD version. The Marillion Brave vinyl has a double groove on side four, ending the album either happily with the track Made Again or less so with water noise. In 2005, a 7-inch single titled "The Road Leads Where It's Led" by The Secret Machines was released in UK that contained both tracks on one side on parallel grooves. The Summer 1980 Mad magazine Super Special included a one-sided sound sheet (see "flexidisc" above), playable on a standard turntable. It had eight interlaced grooves, each track starts with the same happy and upbeat "Super Spectacular Day" beginning of the song but have eight different dark and gloomy endings. In the 1980s, Rhino Records re-released the Henny Youngman comedy album 128 Greatest Jokes as a series of concentric grooves, which they call a "Trick-Track Master". Each side of the album has four grooves.

In the 1980s, the band Pink Slip Daddy released a 10-inch single called "LSD" on clear pink vinyl with pink glitter inside the vinyl. One side of the single had one song that played from inside out and, on the other side, there were two songs that were pressed as concentric grooves. Many of The Shins' 7-inch records have parallel grooves (such as their 2007 single "Phantom Limb," which has "Nothing at All" and "Split Needles (Alt. Version)" on the b-side.) The band None of Your F***** Business released a one-sided 7-inch called "NOYFB Escapes from Hell" (side 2 has a groove, but there is no audio encoded in the groove), with 2 grooves that started from the center and ended on the outside of the disc. One groove ran at 45 rpm, while the other ran at 33 rpm. UK punk rocker Johnny Moped's debut album Cycledelic has a lead track with a parallel groove listed on the label as "0. Mystery Track," which runs parallel to the track. The 12-inch single of the hip-hop group De La Soul's 1989 song "Me Myself and I" has two different tracks in a parallel groove on the B-side. One groove has the Oblapos remixes of "Me Myself and I," while the other has "Brain Washed Follower." One version of the 12-inch single of “The Sensual World” by Kate Bush has the instrumental version of the track in a parallel groove – while the instrumental version also appears on side B as one of two sequential tracks."

Records with parallel grooves have been used in games to provide multiple outcomes, chosen either deliberately or randomly, depending on the game. In 1971, Mattel introduced a game called "Talking Football," in which two players simulate a game of American football. Plays are recorded on small discs, each with six parallel grooves. The player on offense chooses one of ten possible offensive plays, each recorded on one disc, and inserts the corresponding disc into a handheld record player. The other player, without knowing which disc was inserted, then chooses one of six possible defensive plays, marked on the disc so that the record player plays the correct groove corresponding to the chosen combination of offensive and defensive plays. Some plays result in a penalty or turnover, which requires inserting a special disc for that situation, which is unmarked and therefore a random outcome is selected.

In 1975, Ronco UK released a parallel groove game called "They're Off," which featured four 12-inch discs each containing eight possible outcomes on a horse race. It featured Noel Whitcomb, a well-known horse-racing commentator of the day and the game revolved around betting which "horse" would win the race on that occasion. This appears to have been based on a Canadian product called "They're at the Post" by Maas Marketing, which is more or less the same game with different recordings on the discs to reflect the target market.

=== Inside-to-outside recording and hill-and-dale recording ===
In the late 1920s and early 1930s, the Vitaphone sound system used large sixteen-inch 33 1/3 rpm records to provide the soundtrack for motion pictures. The record rotated in the usual clockwise direction but the groove was cut and played starting at the inside of the recorded area and proceeding outward. This inside start was dictated by the unusually long playing time of the records and the rapid wearing down of the single-use disposable metal needles which were standard for playing lateral-cut shellac records at that time. The signal degradation caused by a worn needle point was most audible when playing the innermost turns of the groove, where the undulations were most closely packed and tortuous, but fairly negligible when playing the outermost turns where they were much more widely spaced and easily traced. With an inside start the needle point was freshest where it mattered most.

Almost all analog disc records were recorded at a constant angular speed, resulting in a decreasing linear speed toward the disc's center. The result was a maximum level of signal distortion due to low groove velocity nearest the center of the disc, called "end-groove distortion". Loud musical passages were most audibly affected. Since some music, especially classical music, tends to start quietly and mount to a loud climax, such distortion could be minimized if the disc was recorded to begin playing at the inner end of the groove. A few such records were issued, but the domination of automatic record changers, and the fact that symphony movements, for example, varied greatly in length and could be difficult to arrange appropriately on 20-minute disc sides, made them no more than curiosities.

Until the 1920s, French Pathé Records used inside start and other commercially distinctive grooving. At that time they cut all discs vertically, meaning the vibrations in the grooves were "hill and dale", as their wax cylinders had always been. The records required a special sapphire stylus and a vertically responsive reproducer for playback.

A number of radio transcriptions were standard lateral grooved records (either playing at 33 1/3 or 78) but starting from the inside. An example was those made by the New York Judson Studios, starting in about 1928 or 1929 and running into the 1930s. Each record was 12 inches, made of standard shellac, started in the inner groove and had a locked groove at the outer edge. Some radio transcription discs had both outside and inside-start as a way to maintain the fidelity levels when the record was turned over.

Inventor Thomas Edison, who always favored the cylinder for all its advantages, also cut his discs with vertically modulated grooves from their introduction in 1912 until a year or two before his company's demise in 1929 (Edison Disc Records). Edison pioneered fine groove discs that played for up to five minutes per 10-inch side; they were very thick to remain perfectly flat and played back with a precision-ground diamond stylus. A commercially unsuccessful extension of the system introduced grooves nearly twice as fine as those of microgroove LPs, yielding playing times of up to 20 minutes per side at 80 rpm and again requiring a special diamond stylus. Even more than with Pathé discs, Edison's vertical-cut records called for specially designed equipment for playback.

When using a modern stereo cartridge to play these or other vertical-cut monophonic recordings, the polarity of one channel must be inverted at some point before the two channels are combined to produce a mono signal, as is desirable; otherwise, they largely cancel each other out, leaving little more than surface noise audible.

- In 1977, Mercury Records released a pair of dealer-only promotional LPs called Counter-Revolutions (samplers of various Mercury popular artists at the time) which played from the inside-out and had a locking groove at the disc's edge.
- In 1984, Many Records in Italy released an Italo disco song named "Back To Zero" by Francis Lowe that played from the edge of the label outwards on side B, and normally on side A.
- In 1985, Memory Records in Germany released a limited-edition version of the Italo disco hit "Talking to the Night" by Brian Ice that played from the edge of the label outwards.
- In 1993, American metal band Megadeth released a single "Sweating Bullets," on 12-inch blue vinyl with both sides running from the inside of the disc outwards.
- In 1994, the Cyrus 12-inch single "Inversion" released by Basic Channel had one side that played inside out.
- In 1997, English Sound Artist Janek Schaefer released his first ever record, "His Master's Voices" a transparent two sided LP. Both sides play from the inside to the outside of the disc.
- In 1998, American hardcore punk band Dropdead released their second untitled album, the A side of which plays inside out.
- In 1999, English Noise Artist Paul Nomex released a Parallel Groove 12-inch, "Are you more than just a product of your influence" that plays from the inside out on both sides at both 16 and 78 speeds.
- In 2014, American alternative rock group Camper Van Beethoven released a two-disc reissue of their Key Lime Pie album, featuring one side that plays the song "Closing Theme" from the inside out at 45 rpm.
- In the 2010s, German classical music label Tacet issued some classical recordings that played from the inside out, including Ravel's Boléro (2013) and the fourth movement of Beethoven's Ninth Symphony (2016).

=== Early multiple track (i.e., stereophonic) format ===
Before the development of the single-groove stereo system circa 1957, at least three companies: Cook Records, Livingston Audio Products, and Atlantic Records, released a number of "binaural" recordings. These were not created using binaural recording techniques, but rather one side of each record consisted of two long, continuous tracks — one containing the left channel, and the other containing the right channel. It was intended that the buyer purchase an adapter from Cook Laboratories or a tonearm from Livingston that allowed two cartridges to be mounted together, with the proper spacing, on a single tone arm. Over 50 records were released using this format. (Cook would later reissue at least some of those albums as regular compatible LPs, with both grooves combined into one stereo groove.)

=== Quadraphonic formats ===
Quadraphonic records present four channels of audio, requiring specialized pickups and decoding equipment to reproduce the two additional channels' signals from the groove.

=== Disc noise reduction formats ===
In the 1970s and 1980s, more than a thousand audiophile records were produced with audio tracks specially encoded to be played back through various noise reduction systems in order to reduce noise and increase the dynamic range. Systems employed include dbx disc (1973–1982), Telefunken/Nakamichi High-Com II (1979–1982), CBS CX 20 (1981–1982), and UC (1983–1989).

=== Vibration-resistant discs ===
Highway Hi-Fi was a system of proprietary records and players designed for use in automobiles, utilizing a slower play speed and high stylus pressure.

== Unusual materials and uses ==
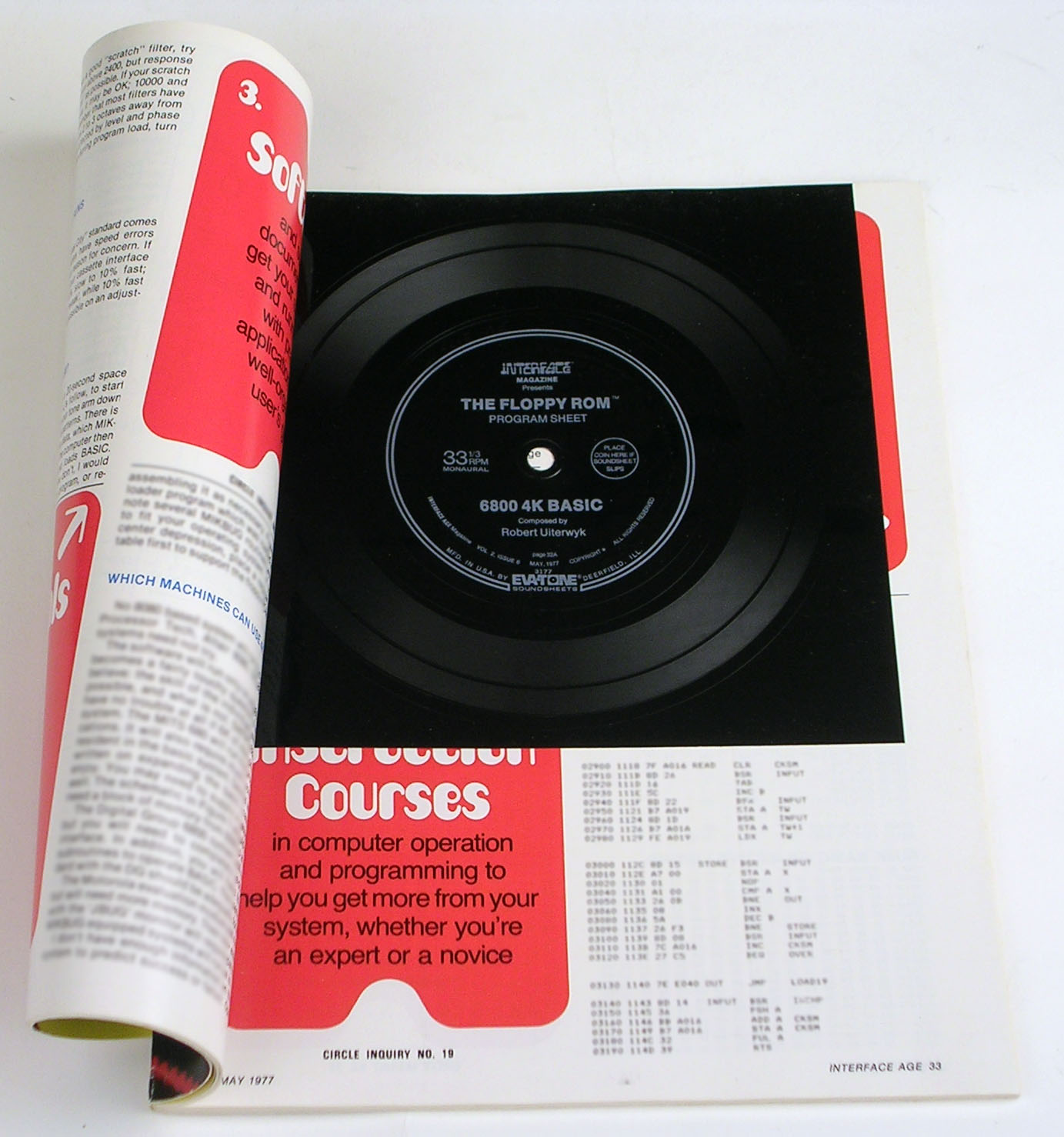
Flexi disc program sheets such as the Interface Age "Floppy ROM" were distributed by computer hobbyist and video game magazines during the late 1970s and early 1980s.

With their origin stretching back to the dawn of recorded sound at the turn of the 20th century, flexible recording media have been made from a variety of materials including foil, paper, and–in the 1950s–thin flexible vinyl known as flexi discs.

Thin, flexible paper-based records were briefly popularized in the 1930s by Hit of the Week Records and Durium Records. "Melody Cards" were popular in the late 1950s. They took the form of an oversized rectangular postcard with the usual address and greeting space on one side and an illustration on the other. The illustration was overlaid with a transparent plastic material into which the grooving was impressed. The recording was usually musical as the name implies. They typically played at either 78 or 45 rpm. It was recommended to not write on them with a ball point pen, an invention which was just coming into common use at that time. Laminated cardboard records have been produced as integral promotional novelties on packaging, most notably on the backs of cereal boxes in the late 1960s and early 1970s.

Beginning in the 1940s, flexible records began to be used in the form of "book records"–spiral bound paper publications and four or five flexible record sheets bound in. A spindle hole went through the entire assembly. Book records could be opened to one of the records and completely folded back around itself, so that the whole thing could be placed on the turntable and played intact.

In the 1950s, advances in vinyl production technology led to the development of the 7-inch 33 1/3 rpm flexi disc record. Only seen occasionally in the 1950s, these recordings were increasingly used as inserts in magazines that included audio supplements from the 1960s through the 1980s. The recordings were pressed on very thin, flexible sheets of vinyl (or laminated paper), providing a mixture of economy, practical utility and novelty appeal. Flexi discs or Soundsheets were often provided by music publishers to their customers, frequently school band and orchestra directors, marching band and drum corps leaders and others, with their printed catalogs of sheet music. The director could then hear a sample recording of the piece as they looked at an excerpt from the musical score.

In the late 1970s and early 1980s, when computer programs and other binary data were often stored on audio cassettes, a number of microcomputer hobbyist magazines published "flexible program sheets" under various trademarked names including "Floppy ROM", "Flexisoft", and "Discoflex". These bound-in thin plastic 33 1/3 rpm audio recordings stored computer data such as video game programs that would be played on a turntable and dubbed onto a cassette. It was also possible to connect the record player's output to the computer's cassette (analog signal) input port and load the data into the computer directly. This method of storing computer data later expanded to include non-flexi-disc novelty releases from musicians such as Chris Sievey.

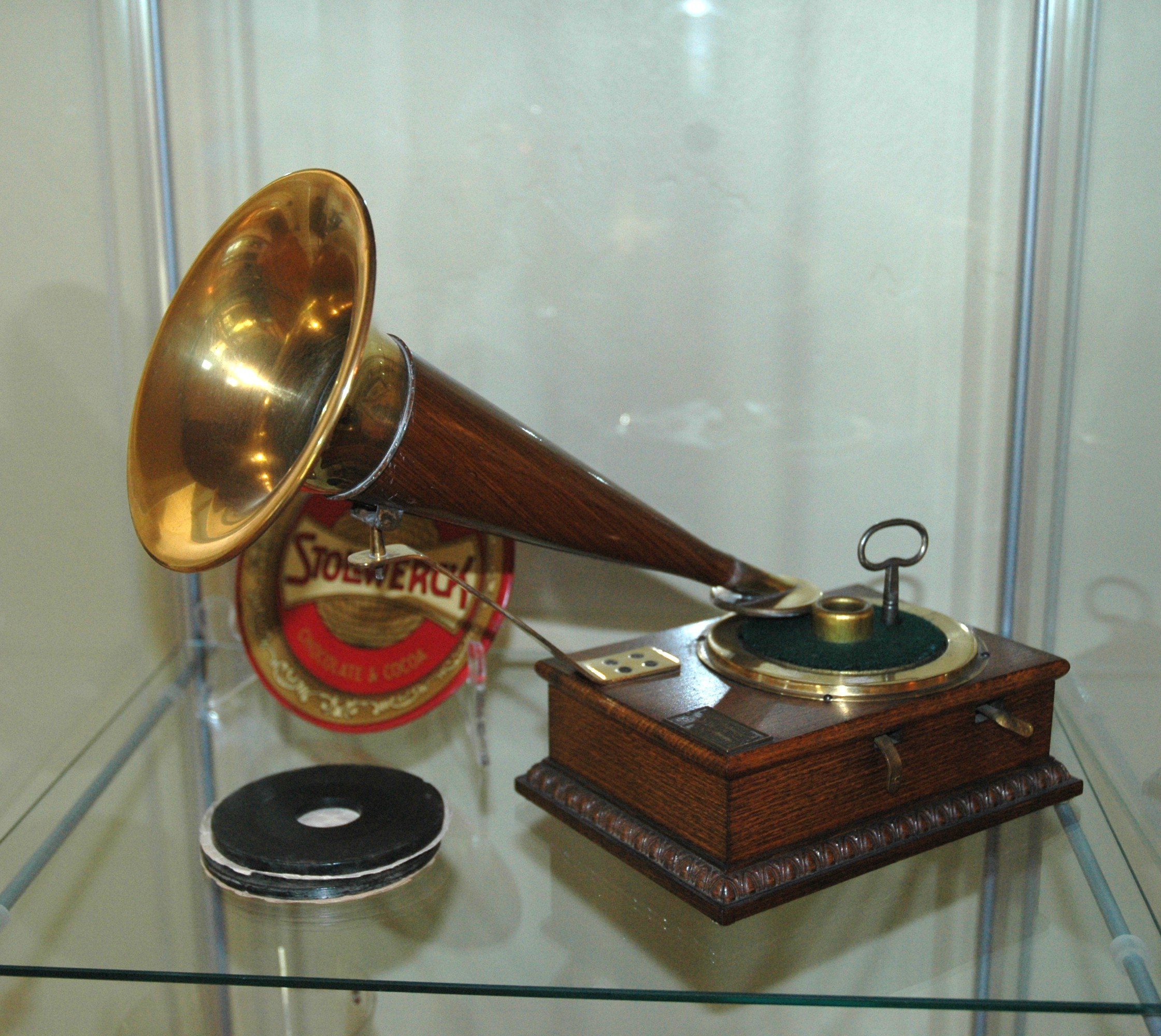
A short stack of small chocolate records, with a special record player made in 1904

Chocolate records about three inches in diameter, and small players made for them, were marketed as a novelty in Europe in 1903–1904. After a record or its amusement power wore out, it could be eaten.

In 1973, the Kingdom of Bhutan issued several unusual postage stamps that are playable miniature phonograph records. These thin plastic single-sided adhesive-backed 33 1/3 RPM discs feature folk music and tourism information. Not very practical for actual postal use and rarely seen canceled, they were designed as revenue-generating novelties and were initially scorned as such by most stamp collectors. Their small diameters (approximately 7 and 10 cm or 2.75 and 4 inches) make them unplayable on turntables with automatic return tonearms.

In the Soviet Union in the 1930s and 1960s, bootleg copies of banned Western music were individually recorded onto used medical x-ray film and sold on the black market. These were called "ribs" or 'Roentgenizdat'.

== Unusual appearance ==
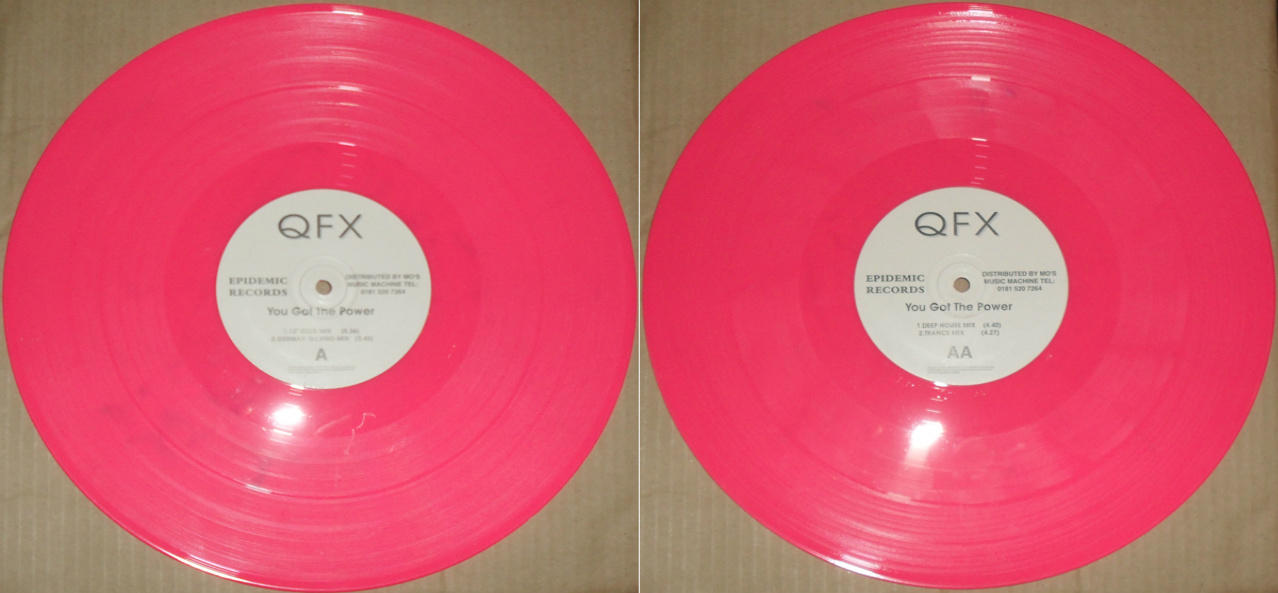
QFX's You Got The Power (1996) on pink vinyl.

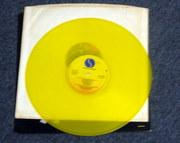
The Ramones album Road to Ruin on transparent yellow vinyl.

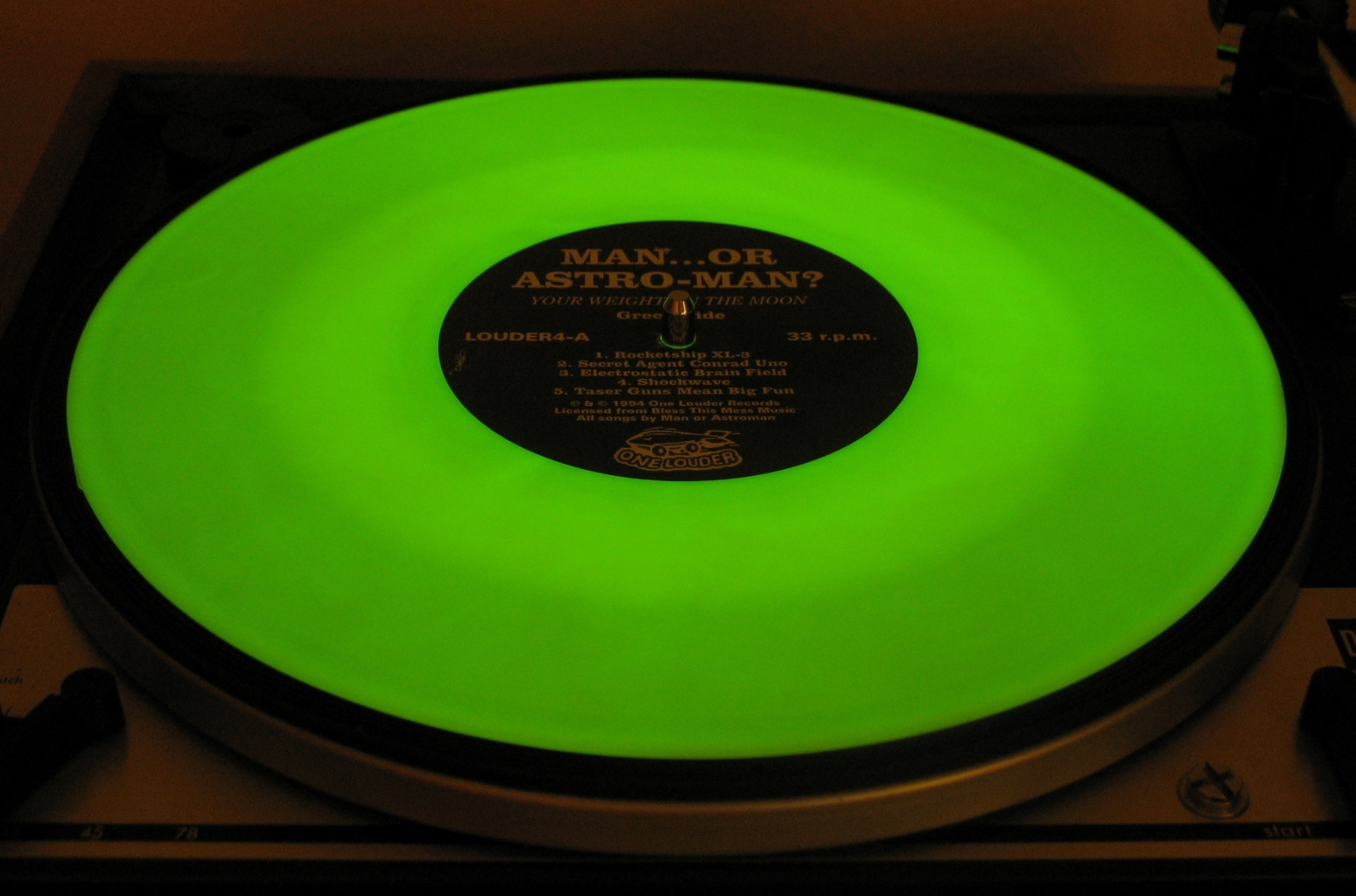
Man or Astro-man's Your Weight on the Moon on glow-in-the-dark vinyl

=== Colored records ===
The first discs by Berliner Gramophone were black, and that has been the standard color for gramophone records ever since. But as early as 1899, the Vitaphone Talking Machine Co. made records that were brownish-red in color. 7" and 10" Nicole Records, about 1904–1908 made of laminated cardboard, were brown. The American Record Company produced records made of blue shellac for their flagship label, although pressings for client labels were made in standard black. Unusual colors, and even multi-colored shellac first appeared in the 1910s on such labels as Vocalion Records. In the 1920s, several companies made records of various shades of brown, including Perfect Records and Grey Gull Records.

When RCA Victor launched the 7-inch 45 rpm record, they initially had eight musical classifications (pop, country, blues, classical, children's, etc.) each with not only its own uniquely colored label but with a corresponding color vinyl. According to experts at the Sarnoff Center in Princeton, New Jersey, the cost of maintaining eight vinyl colors became too high, but the different colored labels were continued, at least for popular music (black) and classical (red, as in "Red Seal"). In October 1945, RCA Victor put on the market its first "non-breakable" phonograph records. Made of a ruby-red, translucent vinyl resin plastic, they cost twice as much ($2 per disc) as the 12-inch Victor Red Seal. In the 1960s, a distinction was made in label colors of promotional copies of 45 rpm records as well, with pop music being issued on yellow labels and country on light green. Sgt. Pepper's Lonely Heart's Club Band was at one point going to be printed on colored vinyl, but this never happened.

In the 1970s, such gimmicks started to reappear on records, especially on 7-inch and 12-inch singles. These included using colored acetate instead of black vinyl. Available colors included clear, translucent white, red, blue, yellow and multi-hued.

Faust released their debut album with transparent vinyl and cover and lyric sheet in 1971, and a transparent 12-inch of Queen's "The Invisible Man" was released. In the 1980s, the ska band Bad Manners released a single on Magnet Records called "Samson And Delilah" that was pressed on clear vinyl, with a clear label and clear print on the label and it came in a clear sleeve. In 1983, American post-punk band Talking Heads released the album Speaking in Tongues; a limited number of copies were pressed on clear vinyl and included in an elaborate plastic case designed by Robert Rauschenberg.

Some recordings were released in several different colors, in a deliberate effort to sell the same product to one person multiple times as collector's items. Currently, it is common practice for hardcore punk to release records of different colors at the same time, and press a smaller number of one color than the other. This has created a culture of hardcore record collecting based on having the same release multiple times, each copy with a different and more rare color.

The 1977 release of the 45 rpm single of "Strawberry Letter 23" by The Brothers Johnson was produced by A&M Records with a slightly pink center label (as opposed to the usual buff color that A&M uses), and had strawberry scent embedded into the plastic to make the record give off the odor of strawberries.

Adrian Snell's 1979 album Something New Under the Sun was produced on opaque yellow vinyl, in reference to the name of the album.

Kraftwerk released a 12-inch single of "Neon Lights," made of glow-in-the-dark plastic in 1978. Penetration released a luminous vinyl limited edition of the album Moving Targets in 1978 and the "Translumadefractadisc" (Han-O-Disc) punk sampler picture disc (which had a silk screened luminous ink under the litho on Mylar film image of Medusa) was released by The Label (U.K) in 1979. The Foo Fighters' debut single "This Is a Call" was available on 12-inch glow-in-the-dark vinyl, and Luke Vibert also released a glow-in-the-dark 11-inch EP in 2000. In late 2010 – early 2011, dubstep artist Skrillex released a limited 500 copy run of his EP Scary Monsters and Nice Sprites on 12-inch glow-in-the-dark vinyl.

The Canadian pressing of Devo's Q: Are We Not Men? A: We Are Devo! album featured spattered-color vinyl, with a grey/white marbled base with splashes of color on the top of that. The UK pressing came in multiple (solid) colors of vinyl and a picture disc edition that came with a flexi-disc (the US edition, however, was plain black).

From the mid-1980s to the early 1990s, Canadian rock singer Bryan Adams released a small number of singles on colored vinyl. Notable examples are "Christmas Time", originally on both black and clear green vinyl and later reissued on red vinyl, and a 12-inch single of "Thought I'd Died And Gone To Heaven" on silver colored vinyl in 1992, in order to commemorate the massive sales of his earlier hit single "(Everything I Do) I Do It For You", which was featured in its full-length version on the disc.

Isis released their first EP Red Sea' on tri-colored vinyl. Divided like a pie, one third was red, one third was black, and one third was tan/gold. Other bands have released records with 2 colors, divided down the middle.

Colored vinyl records became increasingly popular in later years, with some albums having multiple releases in various different colors.

=== Picture discs ===
A picture disc has graphics visible in the grooved playing area, rather than just on an unplayable back side or large label.

Picture discs have been around since the 1920s—or since about 1910, if postcard-size rectangular picture records are included. In the early 1930s, they were a minor gimmick in an attempt to stimulate abysmal depression-era record sales. Most of these early picture discs were simply a very thin clear plastic laminated onto a sheet of printed cardboard before being stamped in a record press. One US series was more substantial. Some suffered from audible defects such as low-frequency noise due to a surface texture or were rapidly worn to shreds by the very heavy pickups and crude steel needles used to play records at that time.

Vogue Records 78 rpm picture discs were made by Sav-Way Industries in 1946 and 1947 and were of high quality both physically and sonically. Their playing surfaces were clear vinyl and there was a sturdy aluminum core disc between the printed sheets. The imagery was usually gaudy and done in 1940s calendar art style. They sold for US$1.05 each, only about 50 percent more than ordinary shellac records, but the list of available titles was short and the recording artists were second-rank at best.

The first 'modern' rock picture disc was introduced as an assortment of artists such as MC5 and The Doors. It was released in 1969 by Elektra/Metronome of Germany and entitled "Psychedelic Underground - Off 2, Hallucinations". The second release was the British progressive rock band Curved Air's first album, Air Conditioning, a UK issue (1970).

In the 1950s, "movie" discs showing a repeating animation were produced, using the Praxinoscope technique, an example here:

=== Unusually shaped discs ===
Tangerine Dream's Warsaw in the Sun, in the shape of Poland (1984).

Shaped discs contain an ordinary grooved centre (typically the same as a standard 7-inch) but with a non-grooved outer rim that can be cut to any shape that does not cut into the grooves. These oddly shaped records were frequently combined with picture discs (see above); a trend that was pushed particularly hard by UK record company branches in the mid-1980s. Curiously, uncut test pressings of shaped discs in their original 12-inch form – with the clear vinyl surrounds still intact – are much more sought after by collectors than the "regular" shapes themselves.

Shaped picture discs were first manufactured in the late 1970s for promotional purposes. An octagon-shaped promotional release of Toto's 1979 single "Georgy Porgy" is cited as the first shaped release. Commercially released shaped picture discs followed in the 1980s. A well known release, also by Toto, is a shaped picture disc with the song "Africa" on side 1 and "Rosanna" on side 2. It was originally pressed in 1983 and reissued on Record Store Day in 2017.

Screamo bands Jeromes Dream and Orchid released a split 10-inch in the shape of a skull in 2000. It spun at 45 rpm and was one sided. Some came in glow in the dark, some in blood red, and some black and white.

Some extreme examples required smaller grooving than standard 7-inch such as the single "Montana" by John Linnell (of the band They Might Be Giants) which was in the shape of the United States. This record was problematic because record players whose tonearms returned automatically after the record finished playing often did just that before the needle actually reached the song.

Canadian hardcore punk bands Left For Dead and Acrid released a split LP on No Idea Records on 31 July 1997 as a saw-blade shaped vinyl record. When these spun on the record player, they resembled a spinning saw. The rap duo Insane Clown Posse released a sample vinyl featuring songs from their studio album The Wraith: Shangri-La, in the shape of the album's "Joker Card", the Wraith. Alternative rock band Snow Patrol released a specially created web-shaped vinyl for the single "Signal Fire," a song which was used in the film Spider-Man 3.

Queensrÿche released their singles "Empire" and "Jet City Woman" on limited edition shaped discs. The "Jet City Woman" picture disc is in the shape of the band's Tri-Ryche logo.

=== Etched discs ===
Recording Angel logo by the Gramophone Company on the back of a single sided record.

Usually taking up a blank side of vinyl, rather than containing music, one side of a disc can be pressed with etched or embossed images. This can take the form of autographs, part of the artwork or logos. Earliest records produced by Emile Berliner, and those by other early companies as Zonophone before paper labels were widely used, had their titles and other information etched or incised into the master, or embossed into the stamper (or both) – either way therefore appearing on all the pressings. Many early Edison Diamond Discs did have etched labels as well, with many (if not all) also featuring a little etched picture of Thomas Edison. The Gramophone company pressed their logo at the blank side of their single sided records in the early 1900s, in the same way. Some later single-sided Red Seal records by Victor had a pattern with the word Victor on it.

After having already released both colored vinyl singles and picture discs in the 1980s, Canadian rock artist Bryan Adams issued a 12-inch single of "Can't Stop This Thing We Started" in autumn 1991, which had the front cover photography etched onto side B.

Coheed and Cambria released their fourth album Good Apollo, I'm Burning Star IV, Volume Two: No World for Tomorrow with side four having etched artwork on it incorporating the band's logo. The "B side" of Dinosaur Jr's cover of The Cure's "Just like Heaven" has a bas-relief "sculpture" embossed on its surface. Side 6 of Boards of Canada's Geogaddi has an etching of a nuclear family for the track "Magic Window", albeit to replace the 1 minute 46 second long silent track that appears on digital versions.

Although these etchings cannot be seen while the record is playing, some are pressed on clear vinyl so the etchings can be seen from both sides. An example of this is the 1997 7-inch of "Freeze the Atlantic" by Cable which has etched fish.

The Japanese rock band Boris (known for their unique LPs; their 2006 album Pink was released on pink vinyl) pressed their 2006 album, Vein, on transparent vinyl with etched artwork on the outer two inches of the record. This causes problems with auto-start phonographs, as the actual grooves of music do not start where the needle is designed to drop. This may cause damage to the needle and record artwork.

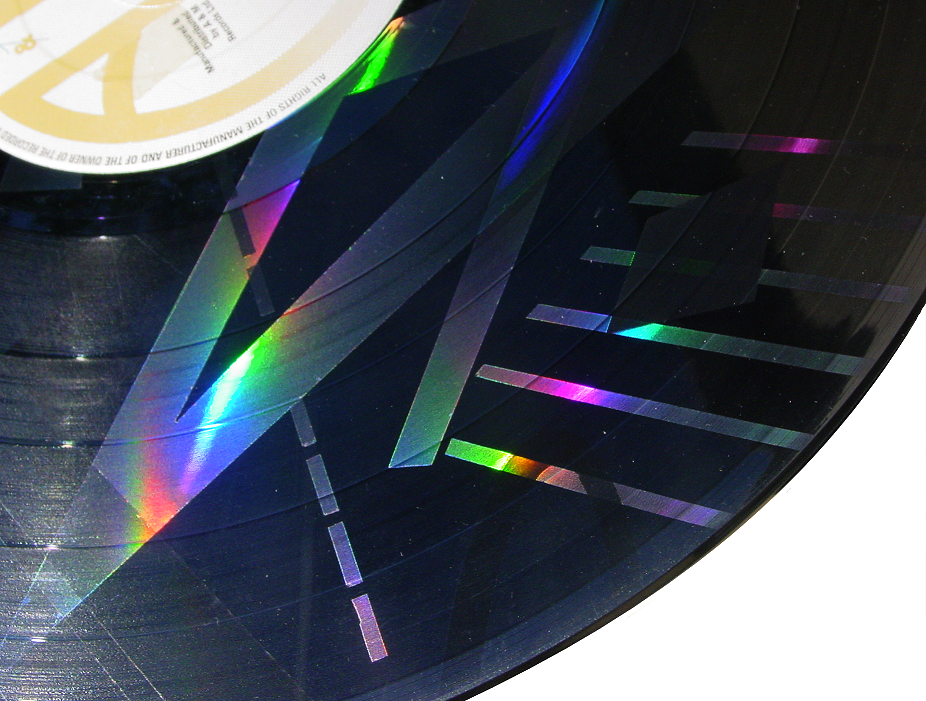
Split Enz's laser-etched True Colours album

The 1980 A&M Records LP of Split Enz's album True Colours was remarkable not only for its multiple cover releases (in different color patterns), but for the laser-etching process used on the vinyl. The logo from the album cover, as well as other shapes, were etched into the vinyl in a manner that, if hit by a light, would reflect in polychromatic colors. This laser etching does not affect the playing grooves. This same process was also used for the 45 single of the band's song "One Step Ahead" from the album Waiata.

The 1981 A&M Records LP of Styx's album Paradise Theatre had a laser-etched design of the band's logo on side two.

The 1990 Mute XL12Bong18 release from Depeche Mode features "Enjoy the Silence" The Quad: Final Mix on side A and the etched image of a rose and a hand-drawn "DM" on side B.

The original soundtrack recording for the film Superman II had a special edition with the Superman "S" shield logo etched five times on each side of the standard black vinyl album.

The double vinyl release of Matt Costa's album Unfamiliar Faces has etched artwork on side D

The 2008 album Unfamiliar Faces by Matt Costa has a double vinyl release but has music only on three sides; sides A–C feature all the tracks from the CD release. Side D has etched artwork instead of music.

The 2020 release of the Quake soundtrack by Nine Inch Nails has program code from the game etched into side D.

The 2018 EP Play by Dave Grohl (of Foo Fighters) has a representation of the studio layout with the various instrument stations as laid out in the studio for recording.

Some unofficial vinyl releases of Glenn Danzig's 1992 release Black Aria had the logo of Glenn's band Danzig etched on side B.

First US vinyl pressings of American rock band Rage Against the Machine's third studio album, The Battle of Los Angeles, have a faint etching of the graffiti outline featured on the cover.

=== Liquid-filled discs ===
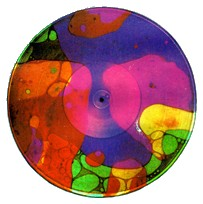
Prototype for The Black Hole soundtrack album.

For the release of the soundtrack for the Disney film The Black Hole, a prototype disc filled with aniline dye colored silicone fluids and oils that freely move around was produced; however, leakage proved too great a problem and it was never released.

In 2012, Third Man Records announced a limited edition 12-inch single release of Jack White's "Sixteen Saltines" on a liquid-filled disc, calling it "the first-ever disc of its kind to be made available to the public" and noting the unreleased Black Hole release.

Also in 2012, The Flaming Lips released an extremely limited (and expensive) edition of their double album of collaborations The Flaming Lips and Heady Fwends, which was filled with a diluted mix of blood contributed by several of the collaborators, including Kesha, Chris Martin and Neon Indian's Alan Palomo. It was pressed at United Record Pressing in Nashville at the same time as Jack White's liquid-filled "Sixteen Saltines" 12-inch, and the first copy of the Fwends blood vinyl was traded for two copies of "Saltines."

In 2014, Waxwork Records released a blood-filled record for the soundtrack of Friday the 13th, limited to under 75 copies.

In 2023, Needlejuice Records released a green-ooze filled LP of Nature Tapes by Lemon Demon.

=== Other concepts ===
A BP Fallon single entitled Fame #9, another product of Third Man Records, was pressed in a process dubbed "Single Signal", in which the B-side has different content on the left and right channels of the stereo groove. Listeners with a balance knob on their stereo are instructed to turn it either to the left or the right to play the record correctly.

An album by Christian Contemporary Rock band Prodigal, titled Electric Eye, included a "locked groove" at the end of its 1984 vinyl that contained a computer software program for the Commodore 64 personal computer. The short BASIC program shows a static screen containing a lightly paraphrased quotation from Albert Einstein and a Biblical verse (John 14:27).

A limited-edition version of the album Jar of Flies by Alice in Chains contains carcasses of real flies embedded into the vinyl.

=== Hologram discs ===
One of the many features added to the vinyl version of Jack White's 2014 album Lazaretto is a floating hologram image of a spinning angel that appears when the record is played and viewed at from a certain angle. Additionally, alongside a standard vinyl release, the soundtrack for Star Wars: The Force Awakens was made available on a holographic record that displays an image of the Millennium Falcon on one side and a TIE fighter on the other, both spinning at the speed of the record. The deluxe vinyl edition of Rush's 2112 features a hologram of a spinning Red Star of the Federation. All three of these were produced by Tristan Duke for his studio Infinity Light Science.

== See also ==
- Capacitance Electronic Disc (CED)
- Hidden track
- Lenticular printing
- List of picture discs
- Pocket Disc
- Shaped CD
- Voyager Golden Record
- VinylVideo
