= Aretino (disambiguation) =

Aretino is a surname or demonym (meaning 'from Arezzo'), and may refer to:

- Pietro Aretino (1492–1556), Italian writer and controversialist; a reference to plain "Aretino" usually refers to him
- Maginardo (fl. 1006–1032), called Aretino, an Italian architect
- Spinello Aretino (c. 1330 – c. 1410), Italian painter
- Leonardo Bruni or Leonardo Aretino (c. 1370–1444), Florentine humanist, historian and chancellor
- Carlo Marsuppini or Carlo Aretino (1399–1453), Italian humanist and statesman.
- Paolo Aretino or Paolo Antonio del Bivi (1508–1584), Italian composer
- Aretino Records, record company in existence from 1907 to 1914
