= Aretino Records =

American record label

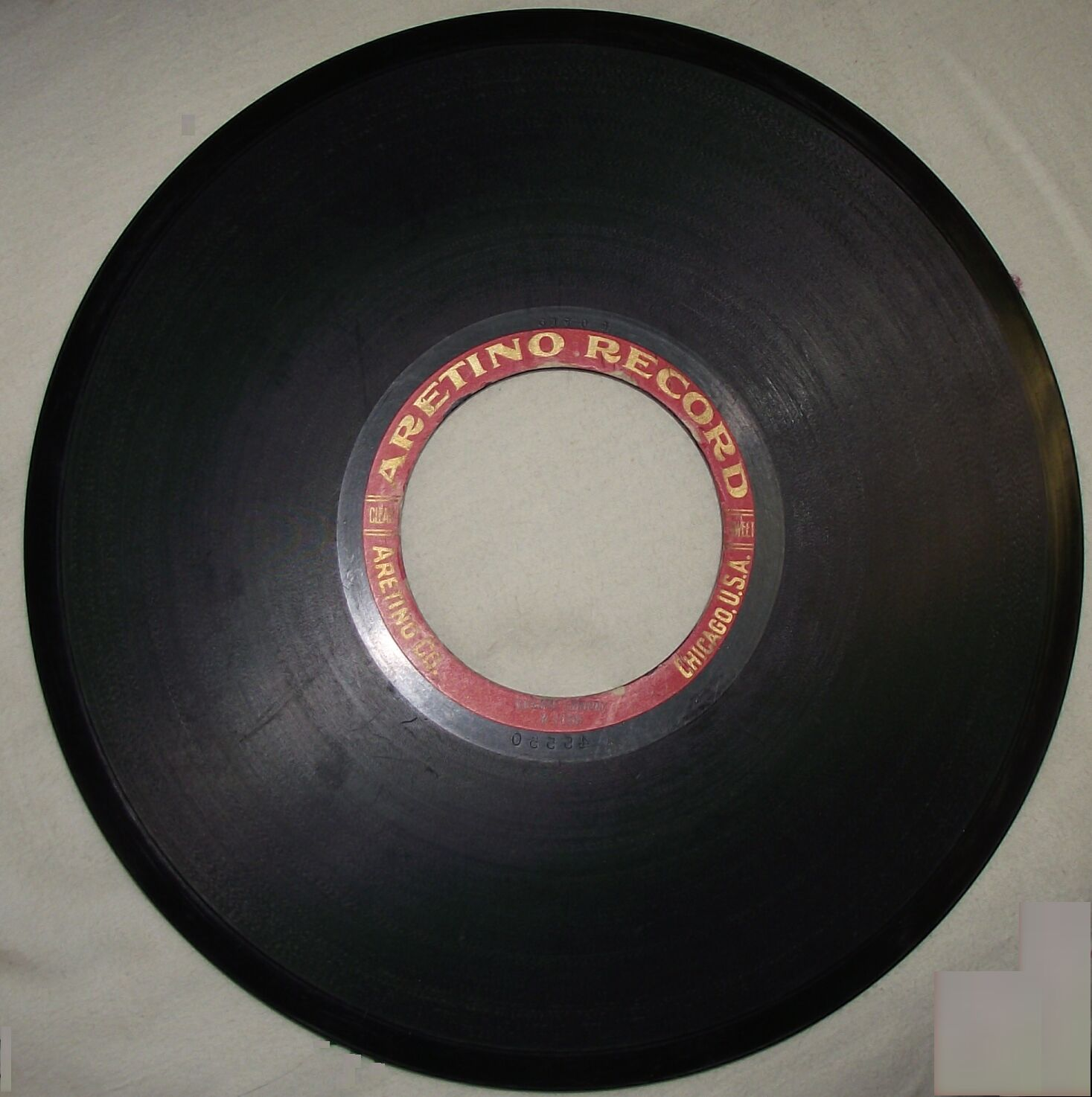
Aretino record

Aretino was a United States record label, in business from about 1907 to 1914.

Aretino was started by Arthur J. O'Neill, who was linked to several Chicago-area record and phonograph operations. O’Neill named this company in honor of Guido Aretino, an 11th-century Italian monk because he was an originator of the musical scale. Aretino is an oddity distinguished by its records' spindle hole, the largest ever produced for commercial purposes. It was a premium scheme, similar to many of O’Neill's operations, in that a phonograph machine was offered cheaply; however, this phonograph could only play Aretino records because it came with a 3-inch spindle. The design was intended such that an Aretino record could be played on any disc phonograph of the time. As such, O’Neill also offered adapters for Aretino discs that allowed them to be played on phonographs with a standard spindle, or even on a Busy Bee machine (another O’Neill operation) with its extra spindle hole.

Aretino did not produce any of its own recordings, but it leased masters from other companies. The first series of Aretino records were a single-sided A-prefix sequence that originated from Leeds & Catlin. This supplier also manufactured a double-sided D-prefix series which is scarce. After Leeds & Catlin was shut down by courts for patent infringement, production was moved briefly to Hawthorne & Sheble and Zonophone, continuing as an A-prefix single sided series. O'Neill and Belford Royal of Universal Talking Machine (makers of Zonophone Records) developed a close business association, but the relationship between Universal and O'Neill ended on orders of Eldridge Johnson, who was concerned that any association with a "cheap" brand such as Aretino, even with a subsidiary such as Zonophone, would tarnish the luxury image of the Victor company. Additionally, Victor had set its sights on Hawthorne and Sheble (who manufactured the Aretino phonograph for O'Neill) in courts of law, and enjoined O'Neill in this lawsuit. O'Neill travelled to Camden in an attempt at an out-of-court agreement, but this overture was rebuffed. Soon afterwards, Columbia became the sole supplier. These D-prefix double-sided discs numbering above 500 are the most commonly found. Columbia also produced an A-prefix series and a 12-inch double-sided series. O'Neill merged his Busy Bee and Aretino operations in 1910, but only continued to make the Aretino product. Aretino ceased operations in 1914, and by 1916 O'Neill's leftover phonograph assets were folded into the Consolidated Talking Machine Company.

The music that appeared on Aretino label was typical of the period. Henry Burr, William F. Denny, Byron G. Harlan, Ada Jones, Billy Murray, Vess Ossman, Steve Porter, Cal Stewart, and Bert Williams among many other early recording pioneers had their recordings leased to Aretino.

== See also ==
- Unusual types of gramophone records
- United Records (1910s)
- Standard Talking Machine Company
- List of record labels
