= Flexipop =

Defunct British pop music magazine

Flexipop (stylized as Flexipop!) was a British pop music magazine that ran from 1980 to 1983, which featured a flexidisc in each issue. The magazine was launched in 1980 by ex-Record Mirror journalists Barry Cain and Tim Lott. One of the most notable issues was the February 1981 disc featuring Adam and the Ants performing a version of the Village People hit "Y.M.C.A.", called "A.N.T.S.". Flexipop's last released flexidisc was "In The Mix" by Haysi Fantayzee in 1983.

The magazine has maintained a memorable reputation among music collectors because of the flexidisc and the revival of interest in 1980s pop.

Huw Collingbourne, a contributing writer to Flexipop, gave an interview to Stylus magazine about the publication in which he said, "Other music mags may have dabbled in flexis, but Flexipop! made a career of it. We had singles by the top bands of the day—everyone from The Jam to Depeche Mode. A really good flexi would make the magazine fly off the newsstands."
