= Baseball Talk =

1989 set of baseball cards

- Type: Trading cards
- Company: Topps
- Country: United States
- Availability: 1989–1989
- Features: Baseball players

Baseball Talk was a set of 164 "talking" baseball cards that were released by Topps and the LJN Corporation during the spring of 1989. Each card featured a plastic disk affixed to the back of an oversized baseball card. When placed in the SportsTalk player the cards would play two to three minutes of recorded audio. The player retailed for $24.99 and was labeled for ages six and up. It required four AA alkaline batteries to operate.

The cards featured most of the better known players in baseball in 1988 and were sold in toy stores throughout the United States and Canada during 1989 Major League Baseball season. LJN and Topps planned to debut talking NFL and NBA cards (it stated in print advertising "Coming Soon – NFL Football and NBA Basketball Talking Cards"), but those plans, along with follow-up MLB editions, were canceled as the card players often broke or played with poor audio quality. Stores were flooded with returned boxes of Baseball Talk and by the fall of 1989 many of the cards and players could be found in discount bins at places like Toys R Us and Target. At one point, packs of cards that had been priced at $4 a piece were selling for as low as 50 cents by stores that were eager to move a failed product.

== Cards ==
The SportsTalk player was sold with four cards (a checklist card that served as an introduction to the series, a Hank Aaron card, and the cards of 1988 stars Don Mattingly and Orel Hershiser). Additional cards were sold with four to a pack and were labeled in a manner that let the buyer know what cards were inside. Mel Allen narrated eight cards that featured highlights from historic games as well as 33 cards of former stars such as Babe Ruth and Duke Snider.

Don Drysdale interviewed the players of the National League for their cards and Joe Torre did the same for the American League players. Many of the cards featured amusing or humorous anecdotes, such as Mike Flanagan recounting how his Japanese baseball glove manufacturer (Mizuno) spelled his name "Mike Franagan" and that the company's executives told him, "Mr. Franagan, we're very grad you use our grub."

=== Rare collectibles ===
Due to the cards and players being on the market for a short period of time and that many of the players did not work well, a complete set and a working player sells for a Beckett book value of $250 to $300 (Beckett 2008 Almanac).

== Checklist ==
The following is the numerical checklist for the only set of cards ever released for Baseball Talk.

=== Eight classic games ===
- 1. 1975 World Series, Game 6
- 2. 1986 World Series, Game 6
- 3. 1986 ALCS, Game 5
- 4. 1956 World Series, Game 5
- 5. 1986 NLCS, Game 6
- 6. 1969 World Series, Game 5
- 7. 1984 World Series, Game 5
- 8. 1988 World Series, Game 1

=== 33 famous former players ===
- 9. Reggie Jackson
- 10. Brooks Robinson
- 11. Billy Williams
- 12. Bobby Thomson
- 13. Harmon Killebrew
- 14. Johnny Bench
- 15. Tom Seaver
- 16. Willie Stargell
- 17. Ernie Banks
- 18. Gaylord Perry
- 19. Bill Mazeroski
- 20. Babe Ruth
- 21. Lou Gehrig
- 22. Ty Cobb
- 23. Bob Gibson
- 24. Al Kaline
- 25. Rod Carew
- 26. Lou Brock
- 27. Stan Musial
- 28. Joe Morgan
- 29. Willie McCovey
- 30. Duke Snider
- 31. Whitey Ford
- 32. Eddie Mathews
- 33. Carl Yastrzemski
- 34. Pete Rose
- 35. Hank Aaron (b) Final season
- 36. Ralph Kiner
- 37. Steve Carlton
- 38. Roberto Clemente
- 39. Don Drysdale
- 40. Robin Roberts
- 41. Hank Aaron (a) Rookie season

=== 122 Present Day Players and Managers in 1988 ===
==== By Team ====
Each team was represented by at least three players except for the 1988 Baltimore Orioles, who had two (Cal Ripken Jr. and Eddie Murray.) It is possible that the late season trade of Fred Lynn from Baltimore to Detroit did not allow time to find a third Oriole. The New York Mets had the most players with eight.

- New York Mets 8 (Hernandez, Carter, Gooden, Darling, Jefferies, Myers, McDowell, and Strawberry)
- New York Yankees 7 (Winfield, J. Clark, Guidry, John, Mattingly, Henderson, and Righetti)
- Boston Red Sox 7 (Boggs, Clemens, Rice, Evans, L. Smith, Greenwell, and Hurst)
- St. Louis Cardinals 7 (O. Smith, Guerrero, McGee, Coleman, Worrell, Magrane, and Brunansky)
- Los Angeles Dodgers 7 (Hershiser, Gibson, Marshall, Tudor, Sax, Lasorda, and Valenzuela)
- Oakland Athletics 7 (LaRussa, McGwire, Canseco, Welch, Eckersley, Parker, and Lansford)
- Minnesota Twins 6 (Hrbek, Gaetti, Viola, Rearden, Blyleven, and Puckett)
- Cincinnati Reds 6 (E. Davis, Daniels, Larkin, Sabo, D. Jackson, and Franco)
- Detroit Tigers 6 (Anderson, Trammel, Whitaker, Morris, Tanana, and Lynn)
- Toronto Blue Jays 5 (G. Bell, Fernandez, Key, Henke, and Flanagan)
- San Francisco Giants 5 (W. Clark, Mitchell, Reuschel, Craig, and Maldonado)
- Montreal Expos 4 (Raines, Wallach, Galarraga, and Brooks)
- Chicago Cubs 4 (Sandberg, Dawson, Sutcliffe, and Gossage)
- Pittsburgh Pirates 4 (Bonds, Bonilla, Van Slyke, and LaValliere)
- Houston Astros 4 (Ryan, Scott, Bass, and G. Davis)
- Cleveland Indians 4 (Snyder, Carter, Butler, and D. Jones)
- Kansas City Royals 4 (Saberhagen, Brett, White, and Seitzer)
- California Angels 4 (M. Witt, Boone, C. Davis, and Joyner)
- Texas Rangers 3 (McDowell, Incaviglia, and Hough)
- San Diego Padres 3 (Gwynn, Santiago, and Kruk)
- Philadelphia Phillies 3 (Schmidt, Bedrosian, and Samuel)
- Atlanta Braves 3 (Murphy, Perry, and Sutter)
- Milwaukee Brewers 3 (Molitor, Plesac, and Yount)
- Seattle Mariners 3 (A. Davis, H. Reynolds, and Langston)
- Chicago White Sox 3 (Guillen, Fisk, and Baines)
- Baltimore Orioles 2 (Ripken and Murray)

==== By Card Number ====
- 42. Dave Winfield, New York Yankees
- 43. Alan Trammell, Detroit Tigers
- 44. Darryl Strawberry, New York Mets
- 45. Ozzie Smith, St. Louis Cardinals
- 46. Kirby Puckett, Minnesota Twins
- 47. Will Clark, San Francisco Giants
- 48. Keith Hernandez, New York Mets
- 49. Wally Joyner, California Angels
- 50. Mike Scott, Houston Astros
- 51. Eric Davis, Cincinnati Reds
- 52. George Brett, Kansas City Royals
- 53. George Bell, Toronto Blue Jays
- 54. Tommy Lasorda, Los Angeles Dodgers
- 55. Rickey Henderson, New York Yankees
- 56. Robin Yount, Milwaukee Brewers
- 57. Wade Boggs, Boston Red Sox
- 58. Roger Clemens, Boston Red Sox
- 59. Vince Coleman, St. Louis Cardinals
- 60. José Canseco, Oakland Athletics
- 61. Fernando Valenzuela, Los Angeles Dodgers
- 62. Tony Gwynn, San Diego Padres
- 63. Doc Gooden, New York Mets
- 64. Mark McGwire, Oakland Athletics
- 65. Jack Clark, New York Yankees
- 66. Dale Murphy, Atlanta Braves
- 67. Kirk Gibson, Los Angeles Dodgers
- 68. Jack Morris, Detroit Tigers
- 69. Ryne Sandberg, Chicago Cubs
- 70. Nolan Ryan, Houston Astros
- 71. John Tudor, Los Angeles Dodgers
- 72. Mike Schmidt, Philadelphia Phillies
- 73. Dave Righetti, New York Yankees
- 74. Pedro Guerrero, St. Louis Cardinals
- 75. Rick Sutcliffe, Chicago Cubs
- 76. Gary Carter, New York Mets
- 77. Cal Ripken, Baltimore Orioles
- 78. Andre Dawson, Chicago Cubs
- 79. Andy Van Slyke, Pittsburgh Pirates
- 80. Roc Raines, Montreal Expos
- 81. Frank Viola, Minnesota Twins
- 82. Don Mattingly, New York Yankees
- 83. Rick Reuschel, San Francisco Giants
- 84. Willie McGee, St. Louis Cardinals
- 85. Mark Langston, Seattle Mariners
- 86. Ron Darling, New York Mets
- 87. Gregg Jefferies, New York Mets
- 88. Harold Baines, Chicago White Sox
- 89. Eddie Murray, Baltimore Orioles
- 90. Barry Larkin, Cincinnati Reds
- 91. Gary Gaetti, Minnesota Twins
- 92. Bret Saberhagen, Kansas City Royals
- 93. Roger McDowell, New York Mets
- 94. Joe Magrane, St. Louis Cardinals
- 95. Juan Samuel, Philadelphia Phillies
- 96. Bert Blyleven, Minnesota Twins
- 97. Kal Daniels, Cincinnati Reds
- 98. Kevin Bass, Houston Astros
- 99. Glenn Davis, Houston Astros
- 100. Steve Sax, Los Angeles Dodgers
- 101. Rich Gossage, Chicago Cubs
- 102. Roger Craig, San Francisco Giants
- 103. Carney Lansford, Oakland Athletics
- 104. Joe Carter, Cleveland Indians
- 105. Bruce Sutter, Atlanta Braves
- 106. Barry Bonds, Pittsburgh Pirates
- 107. Danny Jackson, Cincinnati Reds
- 108. Mike Flanagan, Toronto Blue Jays
- 109. Dwight Evans, Boston Red Sox
- 110. Ron Guidry, New York Yankees
- 111. Bruce Hurst, Boston Red Sox
- 112. Jim Rice, Boston Red Sox
- 113. Oddibe McDowell, Texas Rangers
- 114. Bobby Bonilla, Pittsburgh Pirates
- 115. Bob Welch, Oakland Athletics
- 116. Dave Parker, Oakland Athletics
- 117. Tim Wallach, Montreal Expos
- 118. Tom Henke, Toronto Blue Jays
- 119. Mike Greenwell, Boston Red Sox
- 120. Kevin Seitzer, Kansas City Royals
- 121. Randy Myers, New York Mets
- 122. Andrés Galarraga, Montreal Expos
- 123. Orel Hershiser, Los Angeles Dodgers
- 124. Cory Snyder, Cleveland Indians
- 125. Mike Witt, California Angels
- 126. Mike LaValliere, Pittsburgh Pirates
- 127. Pete Incaviglia, Texas Rangers
- 128. Dennis Eckersley, Oakland Athletics
- 129. Jimmy Key, Toronto Blue Jays
- v130. John Franco, Cincinnati Reds
- 131. Dan Plesac, Milwaukee Brewers
- 132. Tony LaRussa, Oakland Athletics
- 133. Hubie Brooks, Montreal Expos
- 134. Chili Davis, California Angels
- 135. Bob Boone, California Angels
- 136. Jeff Reardon, Minnesota Twins
- 137. Candy Maldonado, San Francisco Giants
- 138. Mike Marshall, Los Angeles Dodgers
- 139. Tommy John, New York Yankees
- 140. Chris Sabo, Cincinnati Reds
- 141. Alvin Davis, Seattle Mariners
- 142. Frank White, Kansas City Royals
- 143. Harold Reynolds, Seattle Mariners
- 144. Lee Smith, Boston Red Sox
- 145. John Kruk, San Diego Padres
- 146. Tony Fernández, Toronto Blue Jays
- 147. Steve Bedrosian, Philadelphia Phillies
- 148. Benito Santiago, San Diego Padres
- 149. Ozzie Guillén, Chicago White Sox
- 150. Gerald Perry, Atlanta Braves
- 151. Carlton Fisk, Chicago White Sox
- 152. Tom Brunansky, St. Louis Cardinals
- 153. Paul Molitor, Milwaukee Brewers
- 154. Todd Worrell, St. Louis Cardinals
- 155. Brett Butler, Cleveland Indians
- 156. Sparky Anderson, Detroit Tigers
- 157. Kent Hrbek, Minnesota Twins
- 158. Frank Tanana, Detroit Tigers
- 159. Kevin Mitchell, San Francisco Giants
- 160. Charlie Hough, Texas Rangers
- 161. Doug Jones, Cleveland Indians
- 162. Lou Whitaker, Detroit Tigers
- 163. Fred Lynn, Detroit Tigers

==== One Checklist card ====
164. Checklist

== See also ==
- Cardboard record
- Flexi disc

== Sources and photographs ==
- Photos and description of player and cards

Street & Smith 1989 Baseball Guide pages 104 and 105.
