= Flexi disc =

Thin flexible vinyl phonograph record

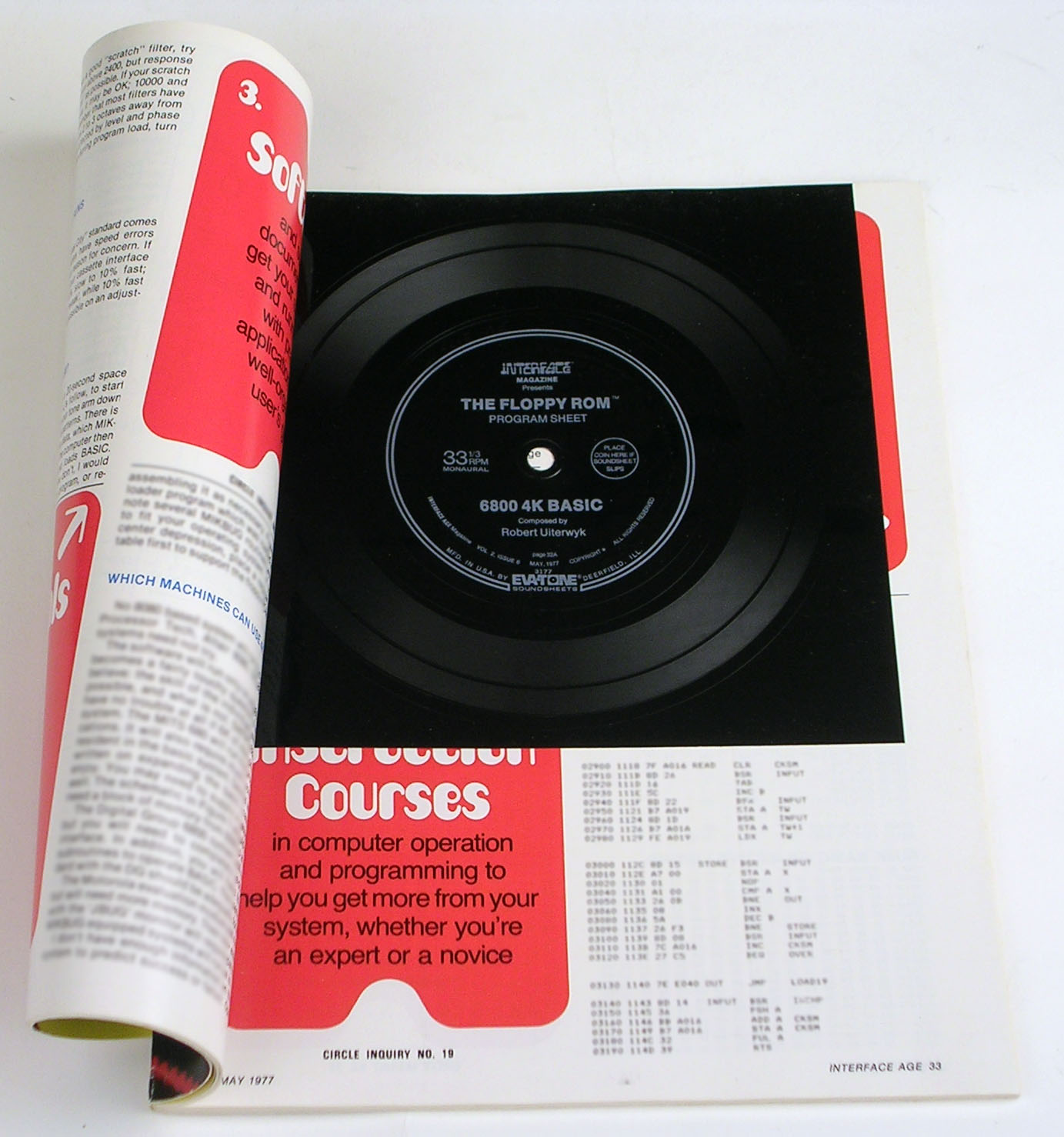
Flexi discs like this Interface Age "Floppy ROM" program sheet were occasionally included as inserts in computer hobbyist and video game magazines during the late 1970s and early 1980s.

The flexi disc (also known as a phonosheet, Sonosheet or Soundsheet, a trademark) is a phonograph record made of a thin, flexible vinyl sheet with a molded-in spiral stylus groove, and is designed to be playable on a normal phonograph turntable.

Flexible records were commercially introduced as the Eva-tone Soundsheet in 1962. They were very popular among children and teenagers. They were mass-produced by the state publisher in the Soviet government.

== History ==
Before the advent of the compact disc, flexi discs were sometimes used as a means to include sound with printed material such as magazines and music instruction books. A flexi disc could be moulded with speech or music and bound into the text with a perforated seam, at very little cost and without any requirement for a hard binding. One problem with using the thinner vinyl was that the stylus's weight, combined with the flexi disc's low mass, would sometimes cause the disc to stop spinning on the turntable and become held in place by the stylus. For this reason, most flexi discs had a spot on the face of the disc for a coin, or other small, flat, weighted object to increase the friction with the turntable surface and enforce consistent rotation. If the turntable's surface is not completely flat, it was recommended that the flexi disc be placed on top of a full sized record.

In Japan, starting in the early 1960s, Asahi Sonorama published the monthly Asahi Sonorama magazine which included an inserted flexi disc ("Sonosheet").

Every year between 1963 and 1969, the Beatles made a special Christmas recording which was made into a flexi disc and sent to members of their fan club. While the earlier discs largely contained 'thank you' messages to their fans, the later Christmas flexis were used as an outlet for the Beatles to explore more experimental areas; the 1967 disc, for example, became a pastiche of a BBC Radio show and even included a specially recorded song entitled "Christmas Time (Is Here Again)."

In 1964, the National Geographic Society released Song and Garden Birds of North America, which included 6 sound discs (12 sides) bound alternating with pages giving the titles and birds on the recordings. The work was done by Arthur A. Allen and Peter Paul Kellogg of the Cornell Laboratory of Ornithology.

The August 1965 issue of National Geographic Magazine included a soundsheet of the funeral of Sir Winston Churchill narrated by David Brinkley. The recording has the sounds of the funeral procession to St. Paul's, a hymn sung by the leaders of the world, and an excerpt of the funeral sermon. Excerpts from various recordings of Churchill's speeches are included. The recording ends with bagpipes accompanying Churchill's coffin to the funeral barge on the Thames, as the public phase of the funeral ends.

During the 1970s, MAD magazine included Soundsheets in several special editions. One was a dramatization of Gall in the Family Fare, its parody of All in the Family, packaged with MAD Super Special #11 (1973). The Summer 1980 edition of MAD Super Special (published in 1979) featured "It's a Super-Spectacular Day", a song with eight different versions pressed into eight concentric grooves; which version was played depended on where the needle was dropped onto the disc. Another issue included "It's a Gas", a song whose lyrics were belches. There was also a "Mad Disco" special issue containing a Soundsheet.

ABBA/Live 77 was a special single-sided promo gold flexi disc given as a bonus to children who sold magazines and books at Christmas for Jultidningsförlaget, a publishing company using door sales as their main distribution channel. The disc contained excerpts from the Swedish group's recent concert appearance in Australia.

A two-sided flexible sheet record of the songs of humpback whales (produced by Roger Payne) was included with the January 1979 issue of National Geographic Magazine. With a production order of 10,500,000 copies, it became the largest single press run of any record at the time.

Computer magazines began to provide software in audio form on flexi discs from June 1979 until 1986, as an alternative to a reader manually typing in a printed program code listing. They were intended to be dubbed by the user onto an audio cassette tape, from which the program could then be loaded into the computer.

While flexi-discs were usually just used as occasional giveaways, from 1980 to 1982, Flexipop made a speciality of giving away such a disc with each edition. Compact discs and the internet have rendered flexi discs largely obsolete, but gimmick discs are still produced occasionally: Amelia's Magazine included a one-sided Libertines flexi of What Katie Did.

American manufacturer Eva-Tone, believed to be one of the last manufacturers of flexi discs, stopped production of the product in August 2000.

As of December 2010, Pirates Press, an independent record manufacturing company based in San Francisco, California, US, had started production of flexi discs of various sizes and color.

In November 2010, extreme metal magazine Decibel began releasing flexi discs with each issue, starting with the January 2011 issue. The content on the disc features "100 percent exclusive songs" from artists that have been previously featured in the publication.

In October 2011, the Los Angeles-based record company, Side One Dummy Records, teamed up with Alternative Press to offer a Title Fight flexi disc (containing 2 previously unreleased B-Sides) along with a year of AP subscription as a limited edition offer. Due to manufacturing delays the discs arrived packaged with the November issue of AP magazine in mid December.

On April 2, 2012, Third Man Records released 1000 flexi discs tied to blue helium balloons into the air in Nashville, Tennessee. The discs contained the first release of "Freedom At 21", a track on Jack White's debut solo album, Blunderbuss. It is estimated that fewer than 100 of the discs will ever be found and they will be a valuable collector's item for many years.

On April 20, 2012, Domino Recording Company released a zine exclusively for Record Store Day that included five individual, multi-colored flexi-discs, each containing a song by Dirty Projectors, Real Estate, Cass McCombs, John Maus, and Villagers. The Dirty Projectors disc was previewed on April 19 by frontman Dave Longstreth via a YouTube video of him playing the record on a turntable.

In 2012, Rookie online magazine released its first hardcopy edition, Rookie Yearbook One, which contained a red flexi disc with two songs written specifically for the site: "I Don't Care" by Dum Dum Girls and "Rookie" by Supercute!.

In the summer 2013 issue of German fanzine PUNKROCK!, the punk rock band Riots, based in Oslo, Norway, gave away a free 2-track exclusive flexi disc to the 200-odd subscribers of the fanzine. This flexi featured two tracks, "Riots" and "We're All Slaves". This was pressed by Pirates Press out of the US.

Shortly before the release of the 2014 Foo Fighters album Sonic Highways, some of the pre-orders came with a cover of Two Headed Dog on flexi disc.

In the summer 2015, PizzaDischi, an independent record manufacturing company based in Italy, has started production of flexi discs too, in collaboration with the European Slimer Records independent label run by Panda Kid members, dedicated to limited and rare edition of worldwide artists.

In 2021, Lizzo started selling flexi discs of her song "Rumours" as part of her merchandising.

In 2026, Playboy magazine included a flexi disc of Charli XCX's song "Playboy Bunny" in their Fall 2026 issue, which featured the singer on the cover.

== In the Soviet Union ==
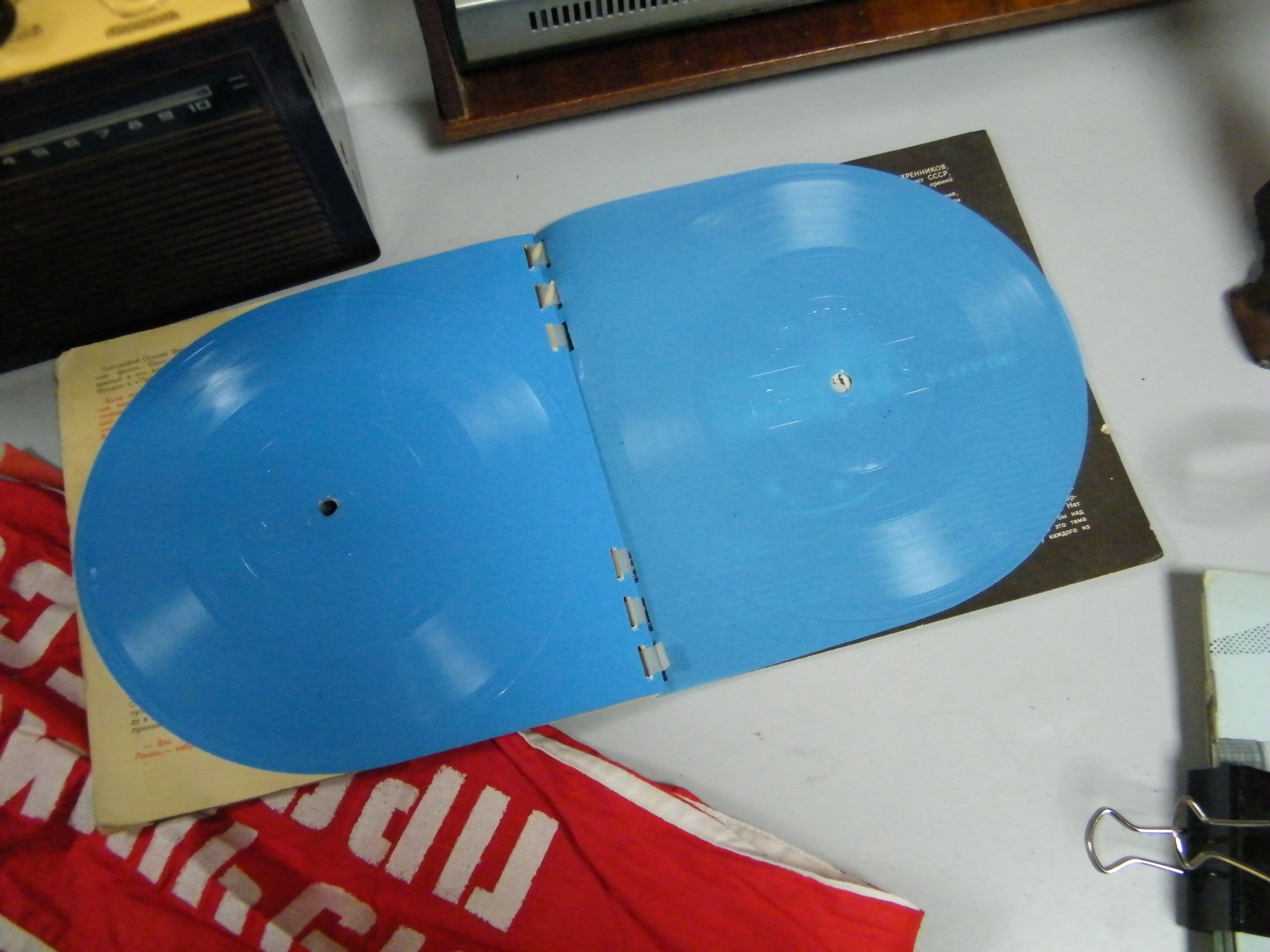
Vivid blue flexi disc in "Krugozor" magazine

Flexi discs were mass-produced from 1964 to 1991 by the Soviet government as inserts in the popular Krugozor magazine for teens. The appearance of the Soviet flexi disc was always the same vivid blue (see image), and the discs are familiar to virtually anyone who grew up in the Soviet Union and even the post-Soviet era. In 1969 in addition to the successful audio-magazine Krugozor, the government also launched the audio-magazine for children Kolobok, which also consisted of flexi disks.

Because of a shortage of vinyl recording material (and official censorship of some Western music) during the Soviet era, bootleg recordings known as Ribs, Bones or roentgenizdat were produced on discarded medical X-ray prints. The musician Stephen Coates of UK band The Real Tuesday Weld has created the X-Ray Audio Project devoted to these.

== Human League track ==
"Flexi Disc" is also the title of a spoken-word track recorded by electronic band the Human League on a flexi disc which accompanied their 12" single "The Dignity of Labour" in 1978. Re-released as a bonus track on their album Reproduction, the song is a discussion between the band members concerning the advantages and disadvantages of the flexi disc format and the possibility of including one with the album to provide commentary.

== See also ==
- Baseball Talk
- Billy and the Boingers Bootleg
- Cardboard record
- Flexipop
- Krugozor magazine
- McDonald's menu song
- PocketDisc
- Roentgenizdat
