= Krugozor =

Soviet literary and musical illustrated magazine

- Frequency: Monthly
- First issue: 1964.
- Country: Soviet Union
- Based in: Moscow
- Language: Russian
- ISSN: 0130-2698

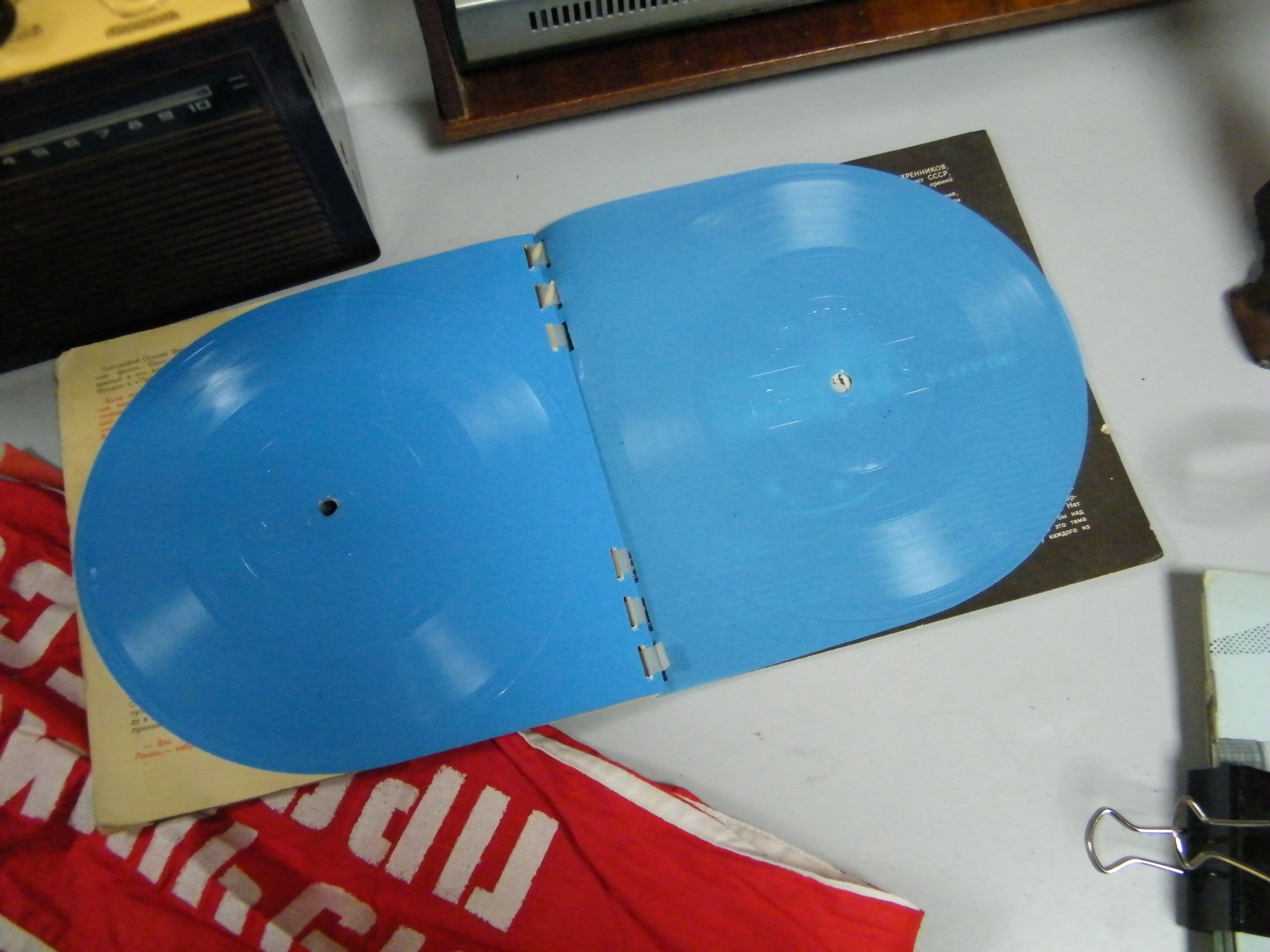
Spread of the magazine "Krugozor" with flexi-discs

Krugozor (Russian: Кругозор, lit. The Outlook) was a literary and musical illustrated magazine with flexi-discs issued in the Soviet Union by Melodiya.

== History ==
The magazine was started in 1964. It was published by Pravda publishing house, with flexi-discs prepared by Melodiya record label (initially known as the All-Union Record Studio).

From 1968, a supplement for children, Kolobok, was also published.

This magazine dealt with documentary, history, classical and contemporary art, literature and music (including music from western countries) and was in immense demand by young Soviet consumers, who would form long waiting lines in stores and kiosks during release days. Each magazine contained up to six Flexi disks. Disks were double sided 33RPM and were produced in the Soviet Union with technology bought from the West. Nikita Khrushchev had initiated the deal; he was inspired by similar disks he had seen during his visits to Western countries.

The 1985 run of Krugozor was 500,000 monthly, not counting Kolobok. Krugozor ceased publication in 1993.
