= Tim Lott =

British author (born 1956)

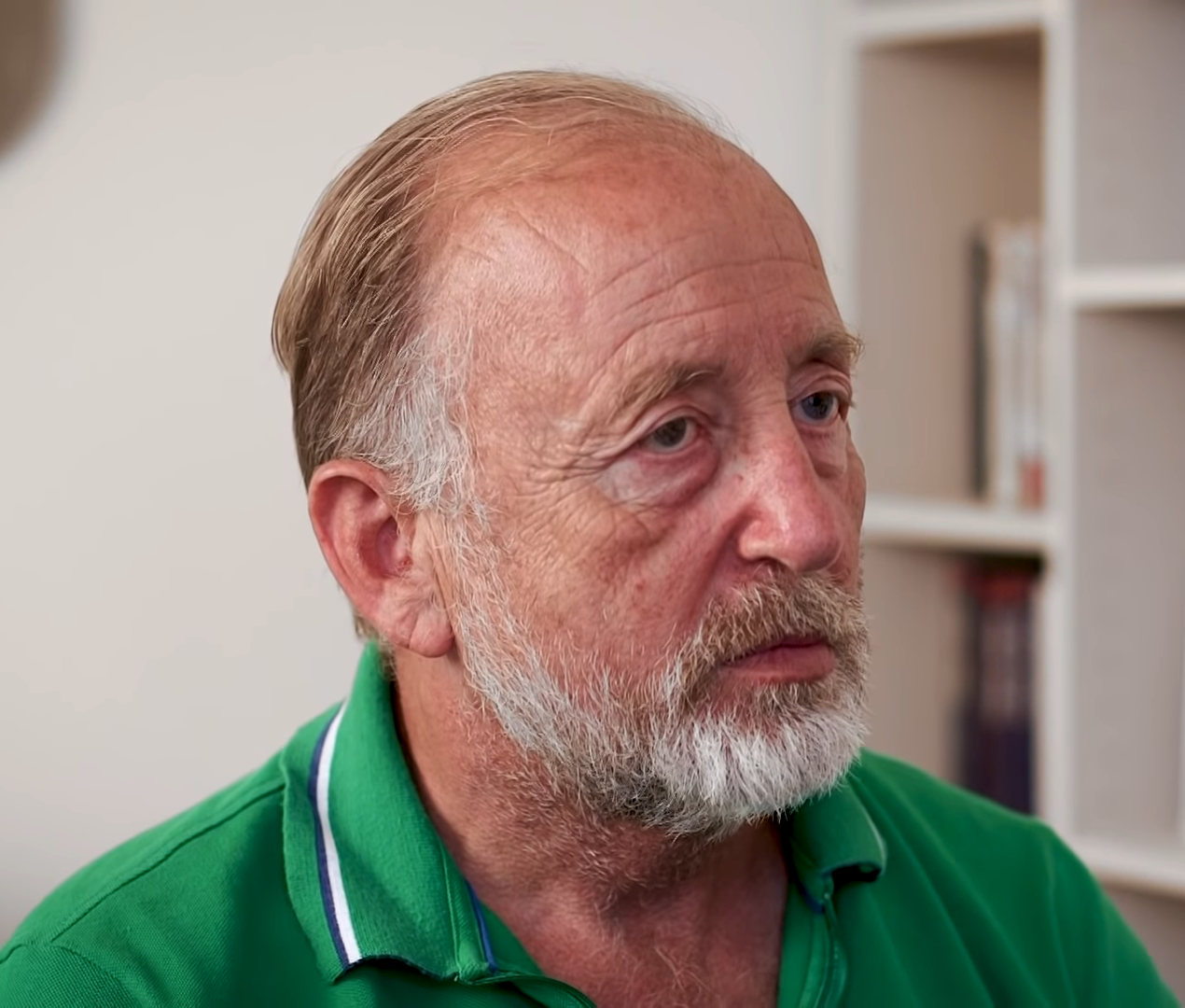
- Born: Timothy Andrew Lott; 23 January 1956 (age 70); Southall, London, England
- Education: London School of Economics
- Occupation: Novelist

Tim Lott (born 23 January 1956) is a British author. He worked as a music journalist and ran a magazine publishing business, launching Flexipop magazine in 1980 with ex-Record Mirror journalist Barry Cain.

== Early life and education ==
In 1956, Lott was born in Southall, West London. He graduated with a degree in history and politics from the London School of Economics in 1986, at the age of 30.

== Career ==
In the late 1980s, Lott briefly worked as the editor of City Limits, a magazine based in London. Lott was a TV producer and a Sunday magazine featured writer.

In 1996, Lott's first book, a memoir, The Scent of Dried Roses, was published and won the PEN/Ackerley Prize for autobiography. It is now published as a Penguin Modern Classic. His next work, and first novel, White City Blue, was published in 1999 and won that year's Whitbread Award for Best First Novel.

He was shortlisted in the Best Novel category of the 2002 Whitbread Awards and the Encore Awards for best second novel for his work Rumours of a Hurricane. He has since published The Love Secrets of Don Juan, The Seymour Tapes and Fearless, a young adult novel for Walker Books, which was shortlisted for the Guardian Children's Fiction prize. He has also featured prominently in the literary magazine Granta, appearing in its 21st anniversary edition as having authored one of the most significant pieces published in the previous 21 years.

His most recent book is When We Were Rich (Scribner). His authored documentary on the class system, The New Middle Classes, was broadcast on BBC Four in 2008.

He is a prolific travel journalist, and an occasional op-ed writer for the Independent on Sunday. He teaches the Writing a Novel six-month course at the Faber Academy in London.

== Personal life ==
Lott lives in Kensal Green, North West London. He has four daughters.
