= Pocket Disc =

Otis Redding Philco Hip Pocket Record (with standard 7 in (18 cm) 45rpm record for comparison)

Pocket Disc was a type of flexidisc, made by Americom Corporation and experimented with in the late 1960s, small enough (4 in (10 cm) in diameter) to be carried in one's pocket or shipped in an envelope and not as fragile as a standard record, but playable on the standard manual-only phonograph or record player (at 45 rpm for Philco Hip Pocket Record or 33 1/3 rpm for PocketDisc). The PocketDisc was cheaper than the Hip Pocket Records manufactured by Philco that sold them to be played on portable record players, which were specially created for the discs.

Twenty-eight major record labels participated in the trials, not including Columbia Records, RCA Records, Motown Records, and MCA Records.

Artists who appeared on these disks included Aretha Franklin, Steppenwolf, Jimi Hendrix, Neil Diamond, The Five Americans, The Doors, Sonny and Cher, Merrilee Rush, and Joan Baez. The disks were sold in vending machines for 50 cents or counter displays at stores for 49 cents; this was later reduced to 39 cents. Each disk had a capacity of about 3.5 minutes of music per side. This meant songs like The Beatles' "Hey Jude" could not be played in their entirety.

The disks were first released on September 15, 1968 and test marketed in several major cities in the United States, but did not catch on. They were discontinued in 1969.

== See also ==
- Pocket Rockers
- Minidisc
