= Panda Kid =

- Origin: Vicenza, Italy
- Genres: Garage rock, psychedelic rock, alternative rock, punk rock, noise rock, post-punk
- Years active: 2010–Present
- Labels: Lolipop Records, Slimer Records, Already Dead Tapes
- Members: Alberto Manfrin
- Website: [pandakkid.blogspot.it Official Website]

Panda Kid, is an Italian garage rock band, founded and currently consists of songwriter member Alberto Manfrin. Starting in 2010 he released several albums, the last of which is Already Dead Tapes and Fdh music with Lolipop Records. After some European tours and a US tour in 2015, the Panda Kid band released the single We will be palm available on Slimer Records as an EP.
