= United Records (1910s) =

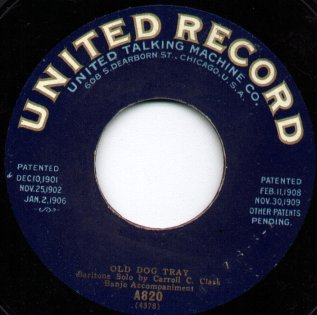
United Records

United Records operated in the years before World War I. The label was owned by the United Talking Machine Company of Chicago, Illinois, which produced the double-sided lateral cut disc records with an unusually large spindle hole (just slightly smaller than that used by the 45 rpm records that appeared after World War II), and wind-up phonographs with large spindles for playing the records.

United Records operated during a period of rapid growth in the American phonograph record industry in the early 20th century.

Most of the masters for United Records were recorded by Columbia Records.

The name "United" has been used by other record companies, most notably one that operated in Chicago in the 1950s. (For this later company, see United Records.)

== Discography ==
A236 - Abide With Me - George Alexander (baritone solo)
Where Is My Wandering Boy Tonight? - (tenor solo) (no artist listed)

A420 - When the Sheep are in the Fold, Jennie Dear - Columbia (male) Quartette. Orchestra Accompaniment.
Uncle Josh Gets a Letter from Home, Laughing Story by Cal Stewart (both sides recorded circa 1907-1908)
A707 - Wonder who's kissing her now
Tenor Solo by Henry Burr
A724 - That's a plenty - Baritone Solo by Arthur Collins
My Wife’s Gone To The Country-Hurrah! Hurrah! - Collins & Harlan, with Orchestra Accompaniment. Rec. in 1909.

A820 - Old Dog Tray - Carroll C. Clark (baritone solo)
b-side unknown

A1023 - Baby Rose - Collins and Harlan (baritone and tenor solo)
Hannah Won’t You Smile A While On Me - Elisa Stevenson and Walter Van Brunt (soprano and tenor duet)

A1025 - Amoureuse Waltz - Guido Gialdini (whistling solo)
La Traviata - Guido Gialdini (whistling solo)

A1201 - Ragtime Soldier Man - Collins and Harlan (duet)
Buddy Boy - Collins and Harlan (duet)

A1246 - Oh, You Little Bear - Collins and Harlan (duet)
When The Midnight Choo Choo Leaves For Alabam (unknown artist)

== See also ==
- List of record labels
