= Standard Talking Machine Company =

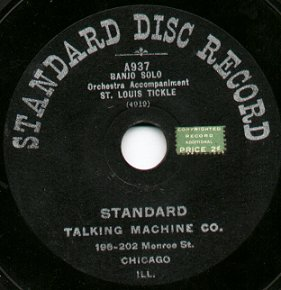
Standard Records

The Standard Talking Machine Company was an American record label that was created in October 1901 and operated until March 1918. The Chicago, Illinois based company distributed several models of phonographs from Columbia Graphophone Company parts and issued single-sided and double-sided disc records from Columbia Records masters. Despite the label name, the discs were not quite ’Standard’; the spindle hole at the center of the discs was 9/16 inch, larger than the industry standard. This made discs produced by other companies such as Victor and Columbia unable to be played upon Standard Disc phonographs, entrapping the buyer into purchasing only Standard Disc records. There were three affiliated companies — Harmony Disc, United, and Aretino — all with increasingly larger diameter spindle holes and record spindle holes. Collectors refer to these four related companies today as the ‘Chicago scheme companies’.

== See also ==
- List of record labels
